= Mirman =

Mirman is a Jewish English surname. Notable people with the surname include:

- Edie Mirman, American actor, producer, and writer
- Eugene Mirman, Russian-born American comedian and actor
- Leonard Mirman, American mathematician and economist
- Michele S. Mirman (born 1953), American trial lawyer
- Simone Mirman, French-born English milliner

== See also ==
- The Mirman School, a school in Los Angeles, California
