= Michele S. Mirman =

American trial lawyer (born 1953)

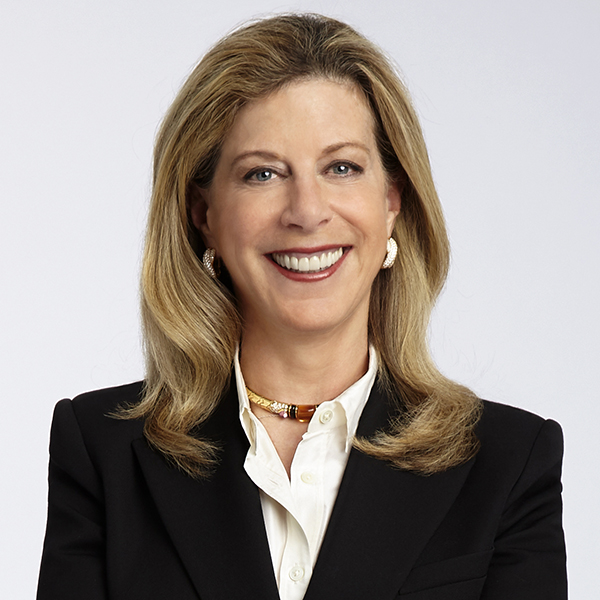
- Born: Michele Sue Turchin; June 1, 1953 (age 72); New York City, U.S.
- Education: Antioch School of Law (JD); Sarah Lawrence College (BA)
- Occupations: Attorney; Philanthropist
- Years active: 1970–present
- Known for: Winning the then highest verdict in the United States ($4M) on behalf of a rape victim in 1985
- Title: President, New York State Trial Lawyers Association
- Board member of: NYSTLA, Lower East Side Tenement Museum, Brooklyn Bridge Park Conservancy

Michele S. Mirman (born June 1, 1953) is a Brooklyn trial lawyer specializing in accidents, medical malpractice, and construction accidents in the New York State and Federal Courts. She has an active member of the New York State Bar for over 42 years, and is known for winning the then-highest verdict in the U.S. for a female attorney on behalf of a rape victim at $4 million in 1985.

In 2017, Mirman was elected as the president of the Brooklyn Women's Bar Association (BWBA) by existing board members and is the immediate past president. She is also delegate to the Women's Bar Association of the State of New York (“WBASNY”).

In 2019, Mirman was named president of the New York State Trial Lawyers Association (NYSTLA). She is listed in City & State's "The 2018 Women Power 100", a list of the 100 most powerful women in New York.

== Education ==
Mirman graduated from James Madison High School in 1970, and shortly thereafter, earned her bachelor's degree from Sarah Lawrence College in 1973. She graduated from Antioch School of Law in 1976.

== Career ==
After law school, Mirman moved to Brooklyn and began working at Spatt & Bauman, P.C. where she tried commercial and personal injury cases. In 1980, she became an associate at Mirman & Associates, then a partner in Michele S. Mirman, P.C. in 1991 before becoming founder and Senior Partner at Mirman, Markovits & Landau, P.C. in 1992.

In 2017, she was elected president of the Brooklyn Women's Bar Association. She is also Delegate to the Women's Bar Association of the State of New York, where she serves on the judiciary committee, which rates New York State Judicial candidates.

On June 20, 2019, Mirman was named president of the New York State Trial Lawyers Association. Mirman is the sixth woman in the organization's 65-year history to be elected with the title of president.

Mirman was featured in Esquire Bank - Justice Stories, highlighting her career and advocacy for women in law.

On October 8, 2025 Mirman was the recipient of the 2025 Champion of Justice Award by AM New York Law.

== Board and community involvement ==
- Founder and President of Brooklyn Women's Bar Foundation.
- Brooklyn Bridge Park Conservancy – Trustee
- Lower East Side Tenement Museum of New York – Board of Trustees
- Allinbklyn – Women's Giving Circle
- Brooklyn Kindergarten Society
- The Making Headway Foundation

== Bibliography ==
=== Articles ===
- Mirman, Michele (September 2, 2019). "New York leads the way in protecting workers' rights". Crains New York. Retrieved September 3, 2019.
- Mirman, Michele (August 9, 2019). "Equifax Data Breach Highlights Corporations’ Troubling Use of Mandatory Arbitration and Need for Reform". Gotham Gazette. Retrieved September 4, 2019.
- Mirman, Michele (October 8, 2025). "Michele S. Mirman - Esquire Bank | Social Justice". Esquire Bank. Retrieved October 8, 2025.
- Mirman, Michele (October 8, 2025). "Champions of Justice 2025". AM New York Law Issue 44, ISSN 30660-3512. Retrieved October 8, 2025.
