= New York Classical Theatre =

Theatre in New York

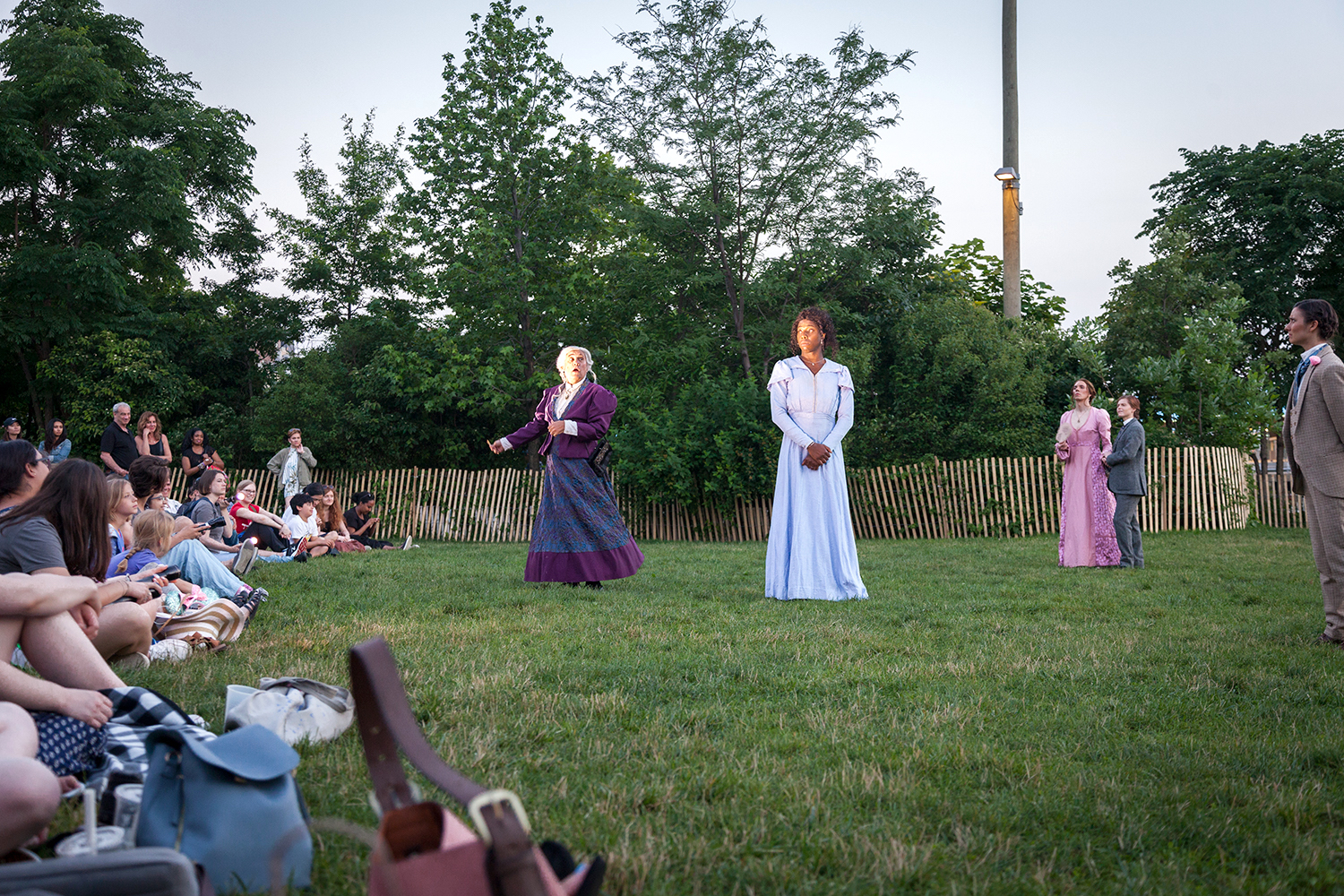
The Importance of Being Earnest performed in Brooklyn Bridge Park

New York Classical Theatre is the only all-free professional off-Broadway theatre in NYC. Founded by Stephen Burdman, the company has presented more than 700 free performances of works by Shakespeare and other classical playwrights including Aphra Behn, Chekhov, Farquhar, Jarry, Marivaux, Molière, Schiller, Shaw and Sheridan. Over the past 19 seasons, nearly 250,000 people have experienced 39 free New York Classical productions outdoors in Central Park, Prospect Park, The Battery, Rockefeller Park, Brooklyn Bridge Park, Carl Schurz Park and on Governors Island, and indoors at Brookfield Place.

Every season they present two free productions in multiple public spaces. The company's production of William Shakespeare's Henry V began in Battery Park (England) and, via a ferryboat courtesy of Statue Cruises, took the audience across the New York Harbor (English Channel) to Governors Island (France).
