= Brooklyn Bridge Park =

Public park in Brooklyn, New York

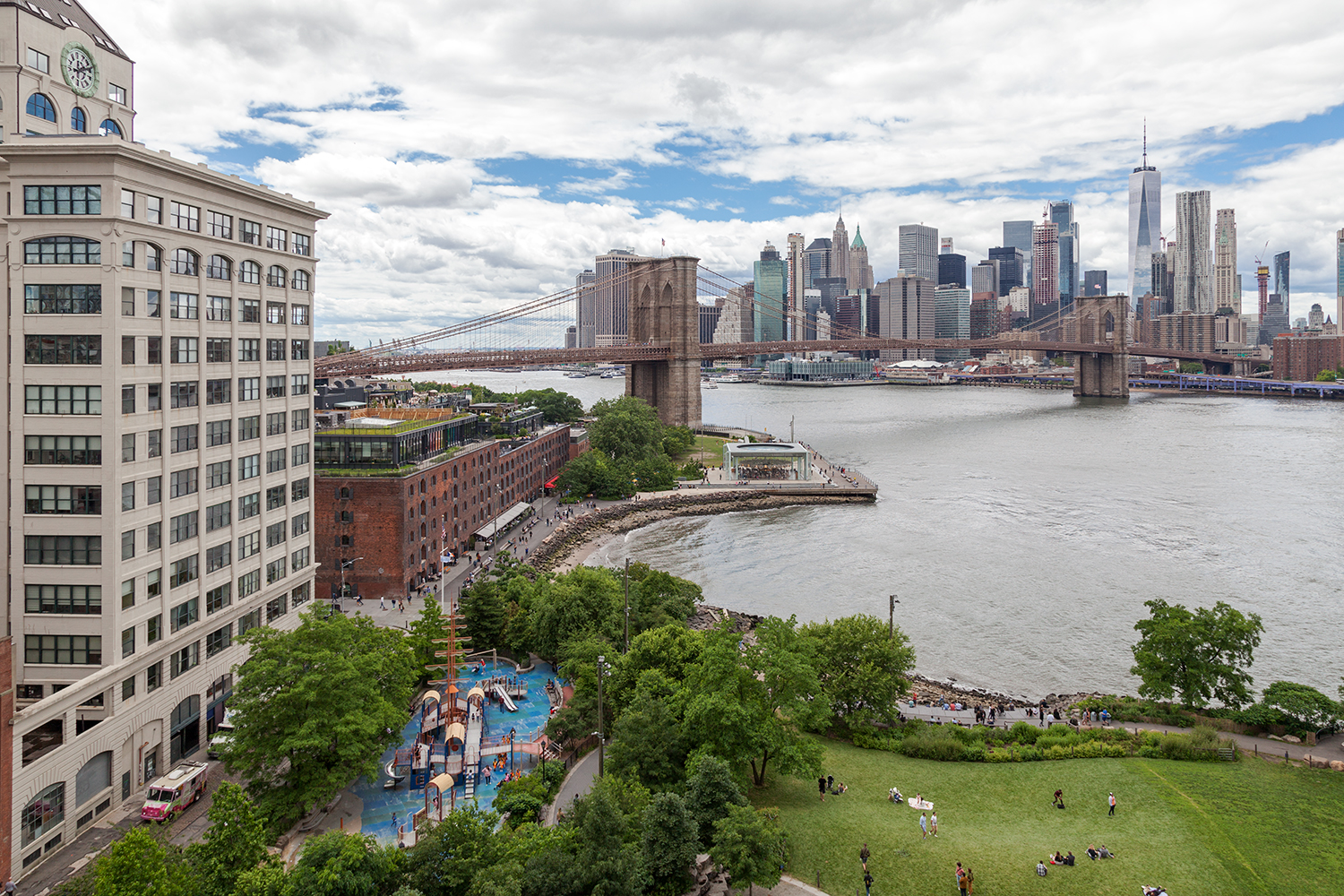
- View of the park from the Manhattan Bridge, 2019
- Interactive map of Brooklyn Bridge Park
- Type: Urban park
- Location: 334 Furman Street; Brooklyn Heights, New York 11201; United States
- Coordinates: 40°41′52″N 73°59′54″W
- Area: 85 acres (34 ha)
- Created: 2010–2021
- Designer: Michael Van Valkenburgh Associates, Inc.
- Operator: Brooklyn Bridge Park Corporation
- Open: 6 a.m. to 1 a.m.
- Status: Open
- Website: www.BrooklynBridgePark.org

Brooklyn Bridge Park is an 85-acre (34 ha) park on the Brooklyn side of the East River in New York City. Designed by landscape architecture firm Michael Van Valkenburgh Associates, the park is located on a 1.3-mile (2.1 km) plot of land from Atlantic Avenue in the south, under the Brooklyn Heights Promenade and past the Brooklyn Bridge, to Jay Street north of the Manhattan Bridge. From north to south, the park includes the preexisting Empire–Fulton Ferry and Main Street Parks; the historic Fulton Ferry Landing; and Piers 1–6, which contain various playgrounds and residential developments. The park also includes Empire Stores and the Tobacco Warehouse, two 19th-century structures, and is a part of the Brooklyn Waterfront Greenway, a series of parks and bike paths around Brooklyn.

The park's first portion, Pier 1, opened in 2010. The land for the park was formerly an industrial stretch of waterfront owned by the Port Authority of New York and New Jersey. After the city and state signed a joint agreement in 2002, site planning and project funding proceeded. The first work, undertaken in 2007, involved the demolition of a warehouse under the Brooklyn Bridge. Since the opening of Pier 1, several other portions of the park have been completed. The park was finished in December 2021. There have been disputes and lawsuits over several aspects of Brooklyn Bridge Park, including the construction of residential developments to help pay for the project.

Brooklyn Bridge Park is overseen by the Brooklyn Bridge Park Corporation, a not-for-profit organization that operates and maintains the park, as well as oversees its construction. The park is served by several bus, subway, and ferry routes.

== History ==
=== As a port ===
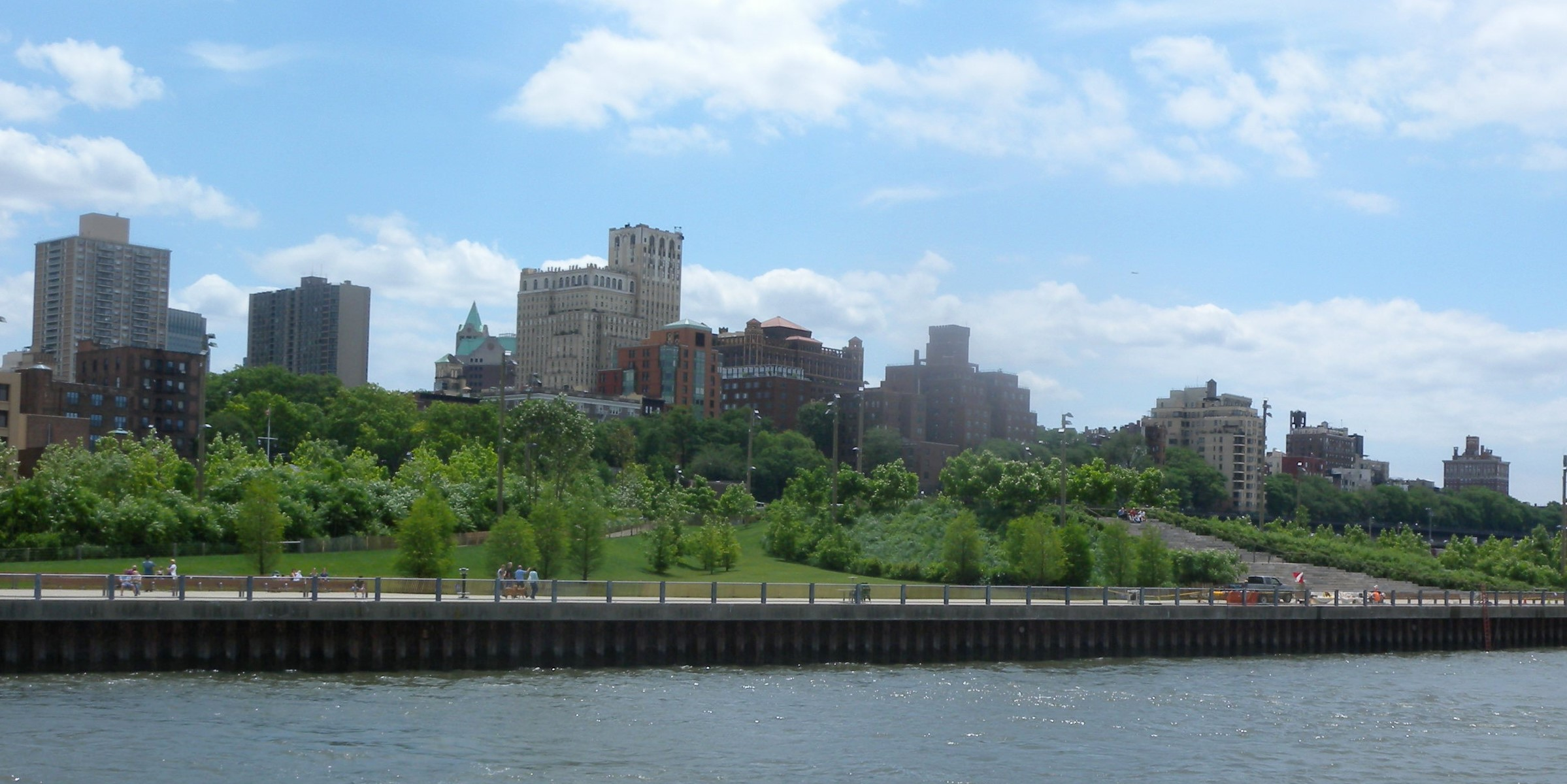
Pier 1

In 1642, the first ferry landing opened on the land that is now Brooklyn Bridge Park's Empire Fulton Ferry section. Soon after, a thriving trading economy developed into a small town called "het Veer", meaning "the Ferry". As het Veer grew throughout the 17th century, it became known as the "Road to the Ferry". On August 29, 1776, during the American Revolutionary War, het Veer served as a crucial strategic location for George Washington and the Continental Army in the Battle of Long Island. In the middle of the night, Washington's troops evaded the quickly advancing British Army by escaping across the East River to Manhattan.

As the 18th century came to a close, additional ferry services were added to this waterfront community, including docking points for the "Catherine Street Ferry" and the first steamboat ferry landing that was created by Robert Fulton, which eventually became known as the Fulton Ferry Landing. The community continued to grow into the 19th century as Brooklyn Heights developed into a residential neighborhood, eventually becoming one of America's first suburbs, as ramps and bridges to the waterfront were built. By the 1850s, Brooklyn City Railroad rail lines were installed at the Fulton Ferry Landing. During this boom period, brick warehouse development proliferated along the waterfront, and the area soon became known as "the walled city". In addition to the warehouses, the Empire Stores were constructed between 1870 and 1885.

In 1883, the Brooklyn Bridge was opened. While the Brooklyn Bridge formed a needed link between Manhattan and Brooklyn, it also disrupted ferry traffic, which reported sharp drops in patronage. In addition, the bridge bypassed the waterfront, spurring more inland development and neglecting the waterfront. The Manhattan Bridge, which opened in 1909, further disrupted trade to this section of the East River. The addition of these two crucial bridges resulted in the demise of this waterfront and the closing of the Fulton Ferry Landing in 1924. The construction of the Brooklyn Heights Promenade in 1950, and the Brooklyn-Queens Expressway (BQE) underneath it in 1954, posed another barrier to accessing the waterfront from Brooklyn Heights.

Throughout the 1950s, over 130 warehouses and 25 smaller "finger piers" were demolished along Brooklyn's waterfront. To accommodate larger ships and cargo, the New York Dock Company built 13 new piers between 1956 and 1964, comprising what is now Piers 1–3 and 5–6 in Brooklyn Bridge Park. However, as trade technology advanced, so did trade routes. By the 1970s, much of the Brooklyn waterfront developments were largely barren and decrepit, causing the Port Authority of New York and New Jersey to end cargo ship operations in 1983. Many of these warehouses were demolished or abandoned by the end of the 20th century. One of the last tenants, the New York State Labor Department, continued to occupy a warehouse until 1996. The warehouses on the piers comprising Brooklyn Bridge Park were not demolished until construction began on the park in 2008.

=== Planning ===
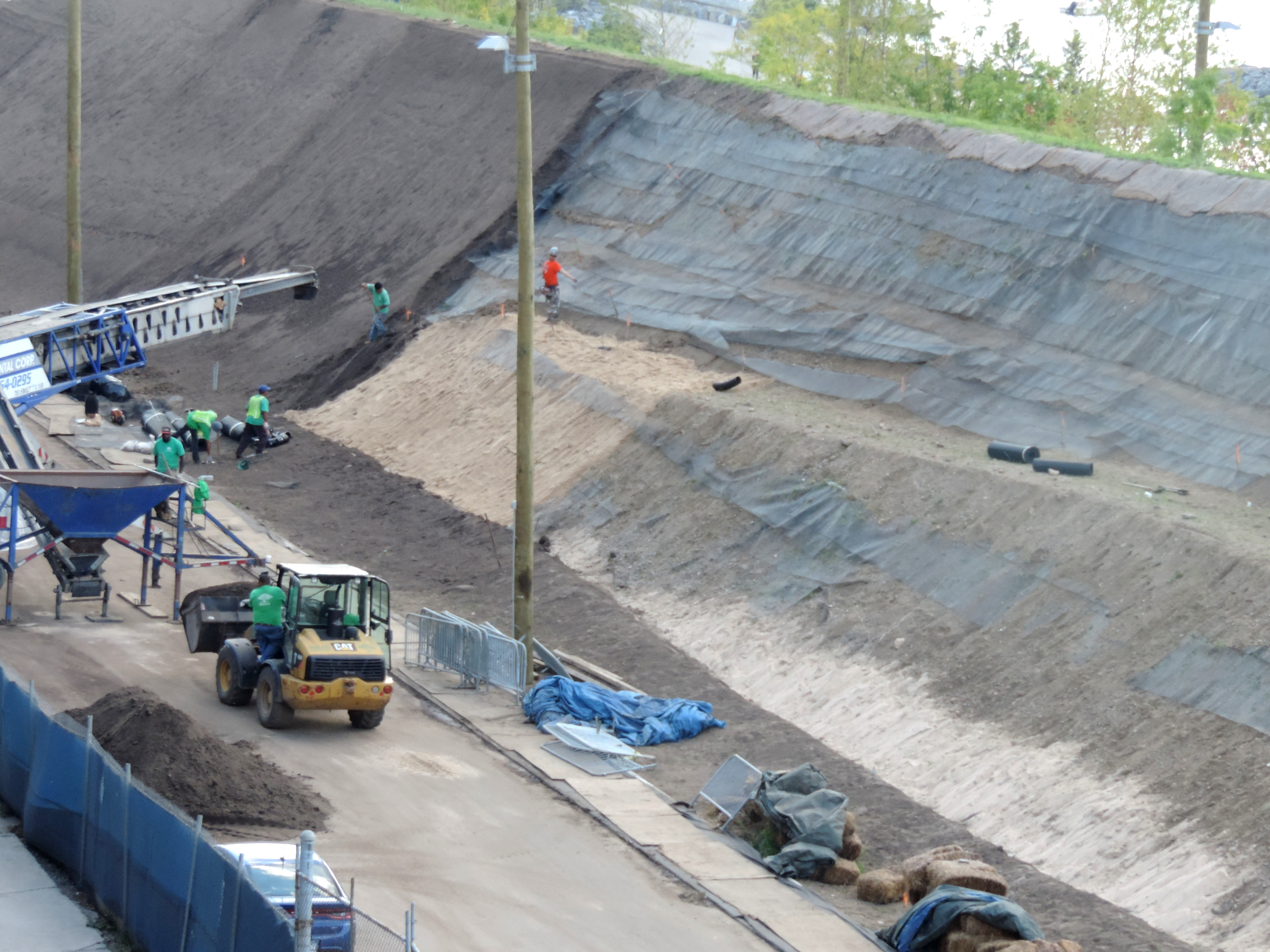
Under construction (September 2014)

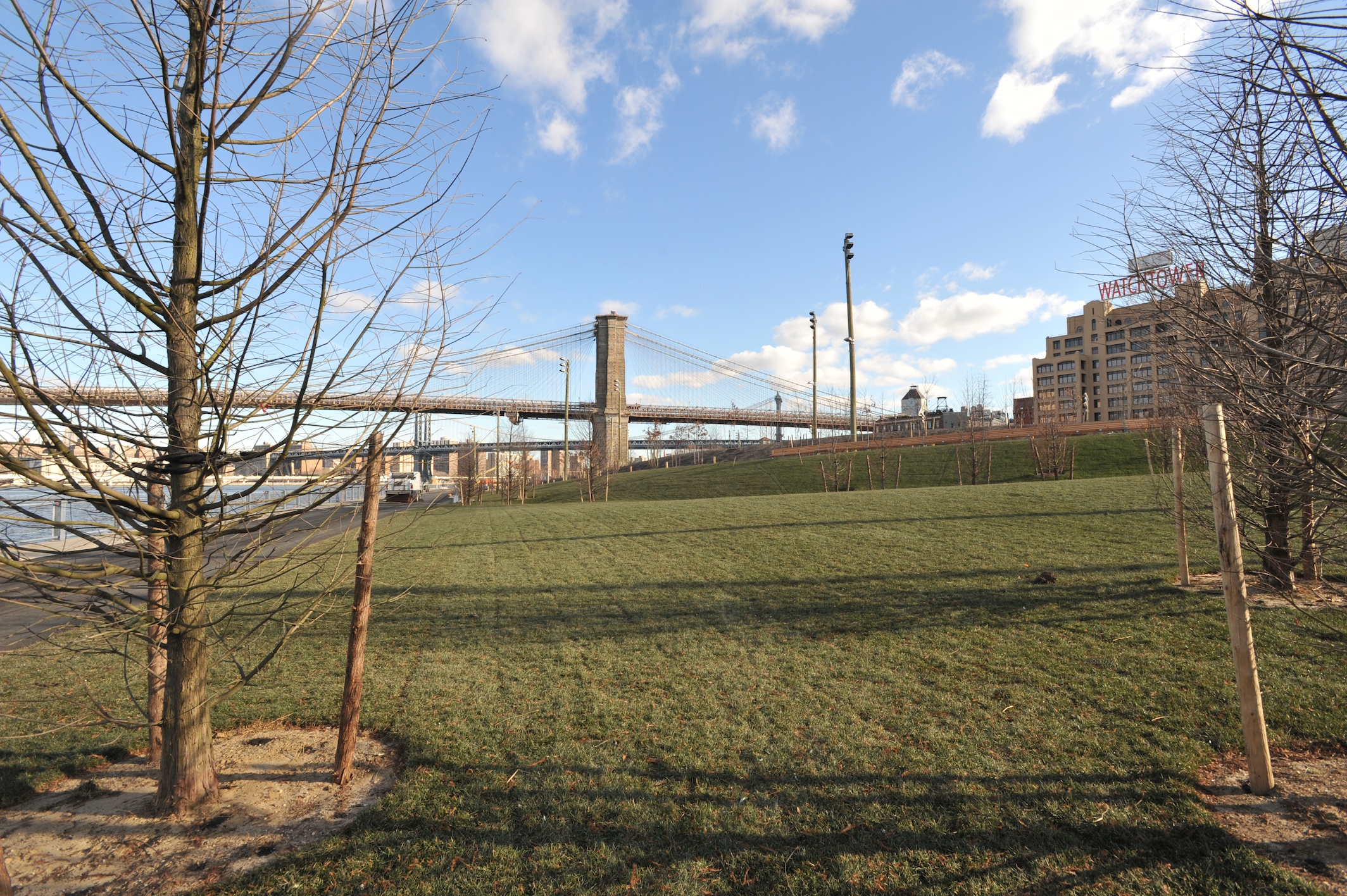
Pier 1, Brooklyn Bridge Park (January 2010)

In 1984, shortly after closing cargo ship operations on this stretch of waterfront, the Port Authority decided to sell the vacant piers for commercial development. In response to these plans, the not-for-profit organization Friends of Fulton Ferry Landing was established in 1985, conceiving the idea of Brooklyn Bridge Park.

At the time of the piers' sale, it was estimated that the 87 acres (35 ha) of docklands between Piers 1 and 6 were worth several billion dollars. As early as 1981, developer David Walentas had proposed redeveloping the warehouses as part of a commercial development, but his plans were complicated by a political dispute, and then the stock market crash of 1987. This gave rise to a protracted dispute over a 55-acre (22 ha) parcel of land at the site. The Port Authority wanted to create a riverside residential development with between 2,200 and 8,800 housing units, surrounded by a 20-acre (8.1 ha) park. The Brooklyn Heights Association wanted the park to occupy the majority of the land, 43 acres (17 ha), with hotels and restaurants spread across the length of the park.

As the Friends of Fulton Ferry Landing grew, its name was changed in 1989 to the Brooklyn Bridge Park Coalition, an organization dedicated to advocating for the park's creation, which is now known as the Brooklyn Bridge Park Conservancy. That year, the coalition petitioned Mayor-elect David Dinkins and Governor Mario Cuomo to prevent the Port Authority from immediately selling the site to developers Larry Silverstein and Arthur G. Cohen, who were in talks with the Port Authority to purchase 73.5 acres (29.7 ha) of land for the riverside development. Rather, the coalition wanted Dinkins and Cuomo to allow an alternative plan to be developed. The coalition called for the creation of a special authority, similar to the Battery Park City Authority, to take control of the site. There was some opposition to the park on the basis that the area was dangerous and far removed from residential neighborhoods.

By 1996, the Port Authority was planning to sell or lease Piers 1 through 5, which were losing money year over year. With planning for the waterfront commencing, Brooklyn Borough President Howard Golden established the Brooklyn Waterfront Local Development Corporation (LDC) in 1998 to complete a year-long planning process for Brooklyn Bridge Park. New York State Senator Martin Connor and Assemblywoman Joan Millman secured $1 million in funding, and the LDC began an intense public outreach process. However this was complicated by various disagreements among members of the LDC, as well as a dispute over why the Brooklyn Bridge Park Conservancy was not part of the LDC. Furthermore, Walentas had announced a new development plan for the area, which would not interfere with the proposed park. Due to strong community opposition, his plan was rejected by the city in December 1999. By February 2000, the Port Authority had agreed to let the piers be developed as a park, rather than for residential or commercial use. Simultaneously, park planners proposed restoring a cove at the site of Walentas's now-canceled development, expanding the Empire-Fulton Ferry State Park by 2.3 acres (0.93 ha).

Various disputes emerged during the planning process. The most serious disagreement concerned one key aspect of the project: the inclusion of luxury housing units. While supporters stated that the housing would help fund the park, opponents argued that it was a "Faustian bargain" that would set a precedent for privately owned public parks, and that the inclusion of housing would no longer make the Brooklyn Bridge Park a true park. There were also disputes over whether to place Jane's Carousel within the park; Walentas and his wife Jane had purchased the carousel, built in 1922, at auction at Idora Park, Youngstown and had wanted to include it in their now-canceled development. While the Walentases now wanted to include the carousel within the park, many residents preferred the park remain a quiet open space. Ultimately, the carousel was included in the park plans, and it opened in 2011.

=== Design ===
The park development efforts culminated in the Brooklyn Bridge Park Illustrative Master Plan, published in September 2000. Subsequently, in January 2001, New York governor George Pataki announced that the state would contribute $87 million of the then-projected construction cost of $150 million. This coincided with the acquisition of the final 1.16-acre (0.47 ha) plot of land that was needed for the park.

On May 2, 2002, Pataki and New York City mayor Michael Bloomberg signed a Memorandum of Understanding (MOU) wherein New York State and the City of New York agreed to create, develop, and operate Brooklyn Bridge Park on 85 acres (34 ha) of the East River waterfront, stretching from Atlantic Avenue to Jay Street. The MOU also formed the Brooklyn Bridge Park Development Corporation (BBPDC) to develop the park, following the guidelines as established by the Illustrative Master Plan. To begin the first phase of construction, New York State, New York City, and the Port Authority of New York and New Jersey contributed a portion of the $360 million of capital funding for a complete park build out. To ensure the park would be fiscally sustainable throughout the years, the MOU mandated that all park maintenance and operations are required to be economically self-sufficient, financed through revenues from commercial and residential development within the site.

The entirety of the first two phases of the park, including the Main Street dog run, both beach portions and adjacent playgrounds were designed in house by NYC Parks landscape architects. In 2004, BBPDC hired Michael Van Valkenburgh Associates, Inc., a landscape architecture firm, to plan, design, and prepare a master plan for the full development of Brooklyn Bridge Park. The park's master plan, unveiled that December, included landscape features such as hills, open plazas, canals, and marshes, as well as recreation features like sports fields, kayaking areas, a waterfront promenade, and playgrounds. The plan also included a hotel, restaurants, stores, and residential projects at the Dumbo and Atlantic Avenue ends of the park. A model of the proposed park was released the following year, and by 2006, the Port Authority had transferred ownership of its piers to BBPDC. The new plans were opposed by the Brooklyn Bridge Park Defense Fund and the Sierra Club, which objected to the inclusion of housing within the park and filed a lawsuit in 2006 to stop the plans. A state judge dismissed the lawsuit ruling that the Defense Fund's claim that the proposed housing violated the state's "public trust" doctrine had no merit since these sites had never been intended to become parkland. On the other end of the spectrum, urban planner Fred Kent lamented the park plans as a missed opportunity for development on the waterfront.

The General Project Plan, approved in 2006, was modified in 2010. In 2011, a new MOU was signed, granting further funding for parkland construction and outlining the requirements for commercial and residential development. Several residential and commercial developments were also planned at the edges of the park, and the park's maintenance would be financed by payments in lieu of taxes from these developments.

=== Construction ===
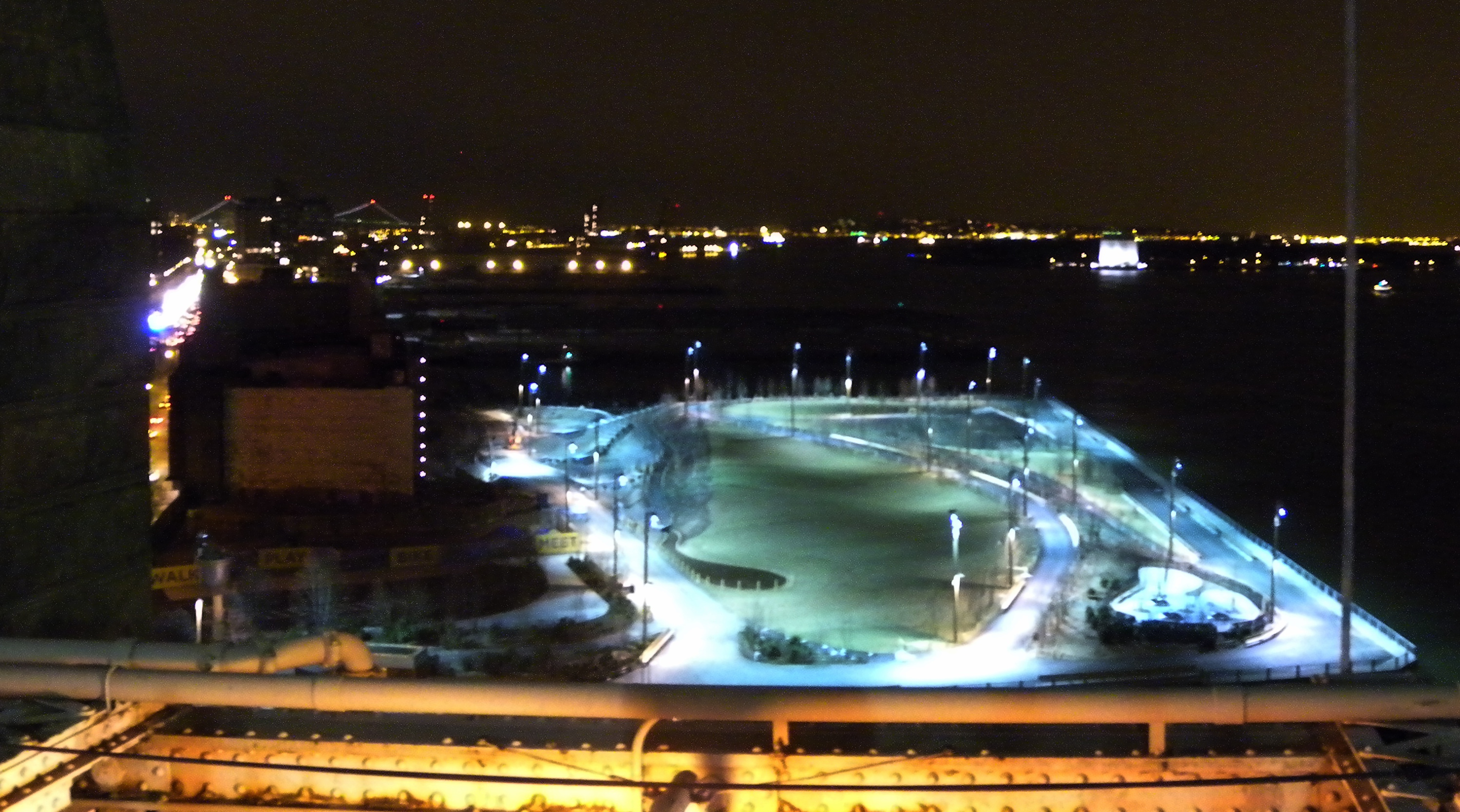
Night view, during construction

The first work on the Brooklyn Bridge Park was the demolition in 2007 of the Purchase Building, a warehouse beneath the Brooklyn Bridge. It was to be demolished to make way for an expanded vista at the park. Construction of the park itself began on January 28, 2008, using reclaimed soil from the new World Trade Center's construction. Excavations for the first part of the park, Pier 1, revealed artifacts from the Jewell Milling Company, a business that occupied the site in the 19th century. The project used soil and excess materials from other construction projects around the city, such as the rebuilding of the Willis Avenue Bridge and Roosevelt Island Bridge, as well as East Side Access. The park was described as the "most important public space" to be built in Brooklyn in over a century, akin to Central Park in the late 19th century.

Empire–Fulton Ferry State Park was closed in early 2010 for renovations, and was devolved to Brooklyn Bridge Park's control. The first 6 acres (2.4 ha) of park opened in March 2010 at Pier 1 and contained waterfront walkways, a playground, lookout, and lawn. Later that summer nearly 12 acres (4.9 ha) of parkland opened on Pier 6 and the Pier 2 uplands, bringing playgrounds, sand volleyball courts, concessionaires, and natural habitats to the park.

After Piers 1 and 6 were opened to the public, a nonprofit corporation sharing a name with the park was established to continue parkland construction and to plan for park maintenance and operation. The Empire–Fulton Ferry section, including Jane's Carousel, reopened in September 2011. The same year, Brooklyn Bridge Park won the Rudy Bruner Award for Urban Excellence silver medal. Pier 5 subsequently opened in December 2012, followed by the Pier 3 terrace in November 2013 and Piers 2 and 4 in May 2014. The Main Street Park was renovated and expanded in August 2015, and the Pier 6 landscape opened in late 2015. The Tobacco Warehouse was also converted to a performance space in 2015, and Empire Stores opened the following year. The One 15 Marina between piers 4 and 5 also opened in April 2016, and two restaurants opened at the marina in 2019.

By the time Pier 3 opened in July 2018, the park was 90% complete. At that point, only three sections remained to be opened: the Pier 2 uplands; a permanent swimming pool at Squibb Park; and the area under the Brooklyn Bridge, between the Empire–Fulton Ferry section and the rest of the park. The final section of the park, Emily Warren Roebling Plaza, was approved in May 2020 and opened in December 2021.

=== Operation ===
Work on a new entrance pavilion at Pier 1 commenced in July 2023, and a pop-up skating rink called Glide opened at the park that December. After the park's completion, Michael Van Valkenburgh published a book about the park's development in 2024. Curbed architectural critic Justin Davidson wrote that the park was successful in part because Van Valkenburgh remained involved in the project long after it was complete. Davidson wrote that landscape features were combined to make the park "spectacular but un-precious, informal but highly artificial, tough enough to withstand crowds and violent weather". At the time, the park had 5 million annual visitors, of which only a third came from the surrounding neighborhood. The operator of the park's marina filed for Chapter 11 bankruptcy protection in September 2024, and the Pier 1 pavilion opened in April 2025.

==== Effects ====
Since opening, the park has led to the construction of residential developments with some of the most expensive housing units in Brooklyn. This included a $19.2 million penthouse, which became the most expensive home in Brooklyn when it was put up for sale in 2017. However, during the development of Brooklyn Bridge Park, groups filed several lawsuits to stop the construction of various developments in the park. A 2014 lawsuit, alleging that a hotel at Pier 1 was too tall, was dismissed in June 2015. Two other suits to halt the construction of an adjacent condominium complex were dismissed in September 2015 and in June 2016. A fourth lawsuit concerning two residential buildings at Pier 6 resulted in a settlement in May 2015 where the heights of these buildings were reduced.

== Park sections ==
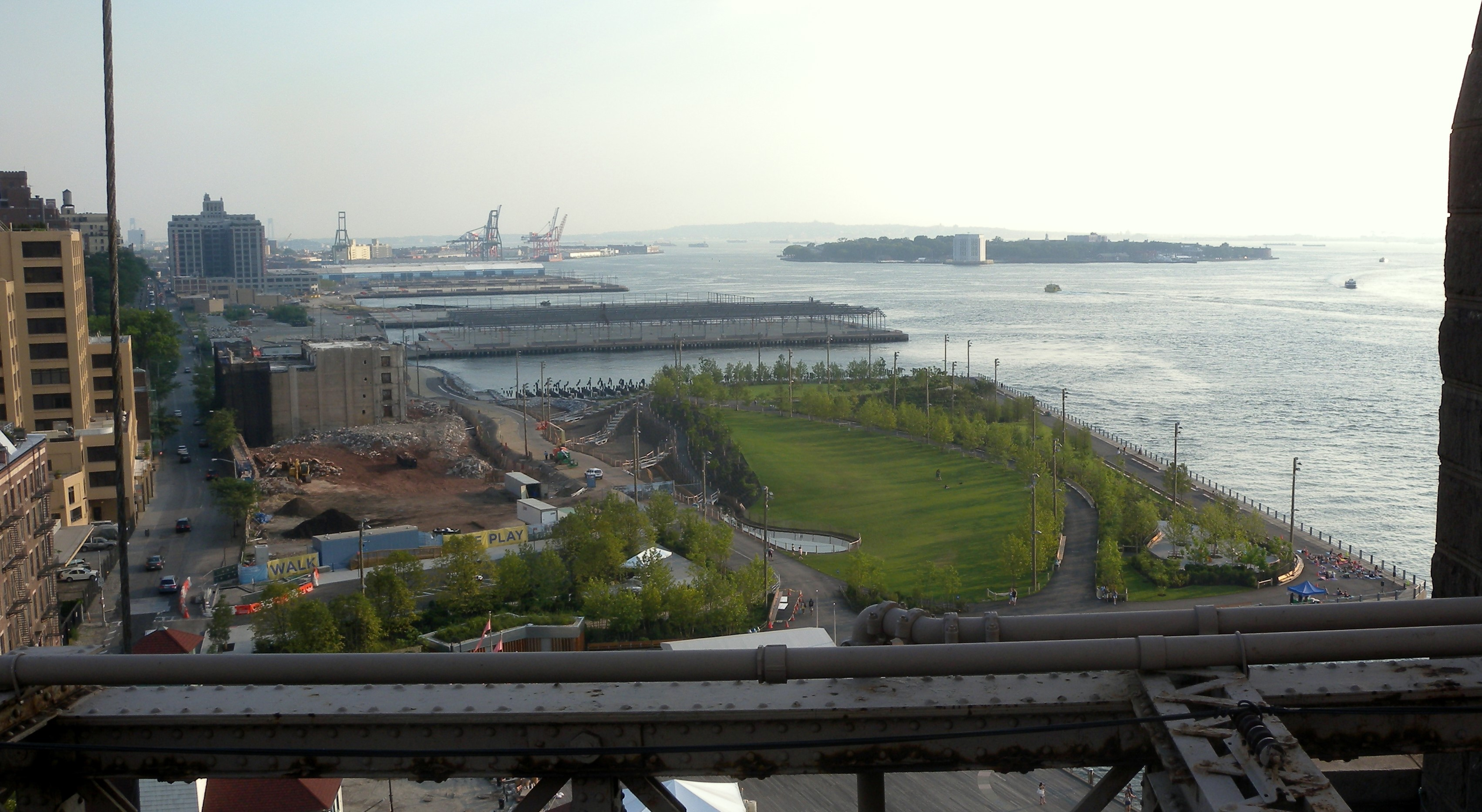
View of the Park from the Brooklyn Bridge

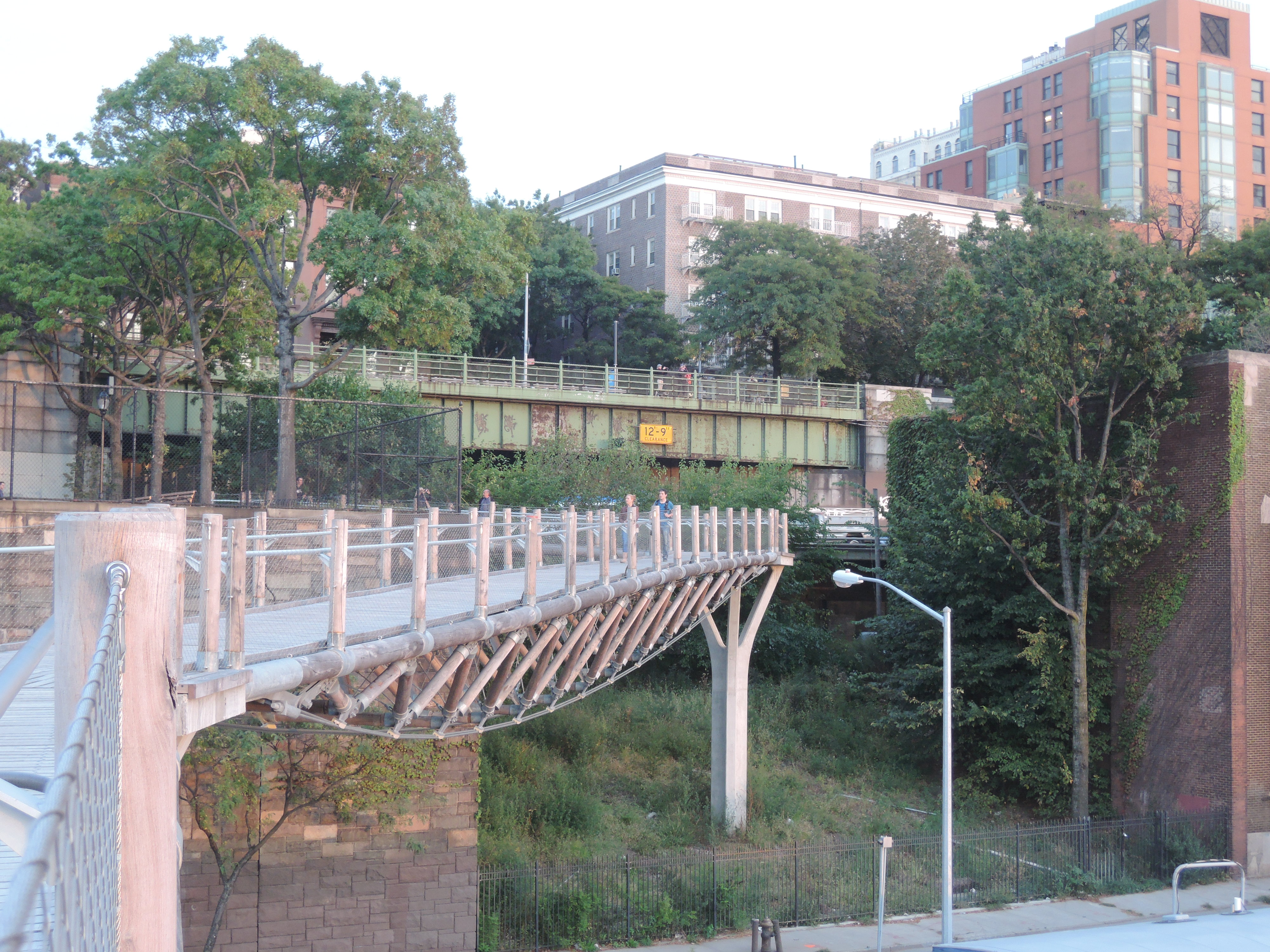
Squibb Park Inverted Suspension Bridge

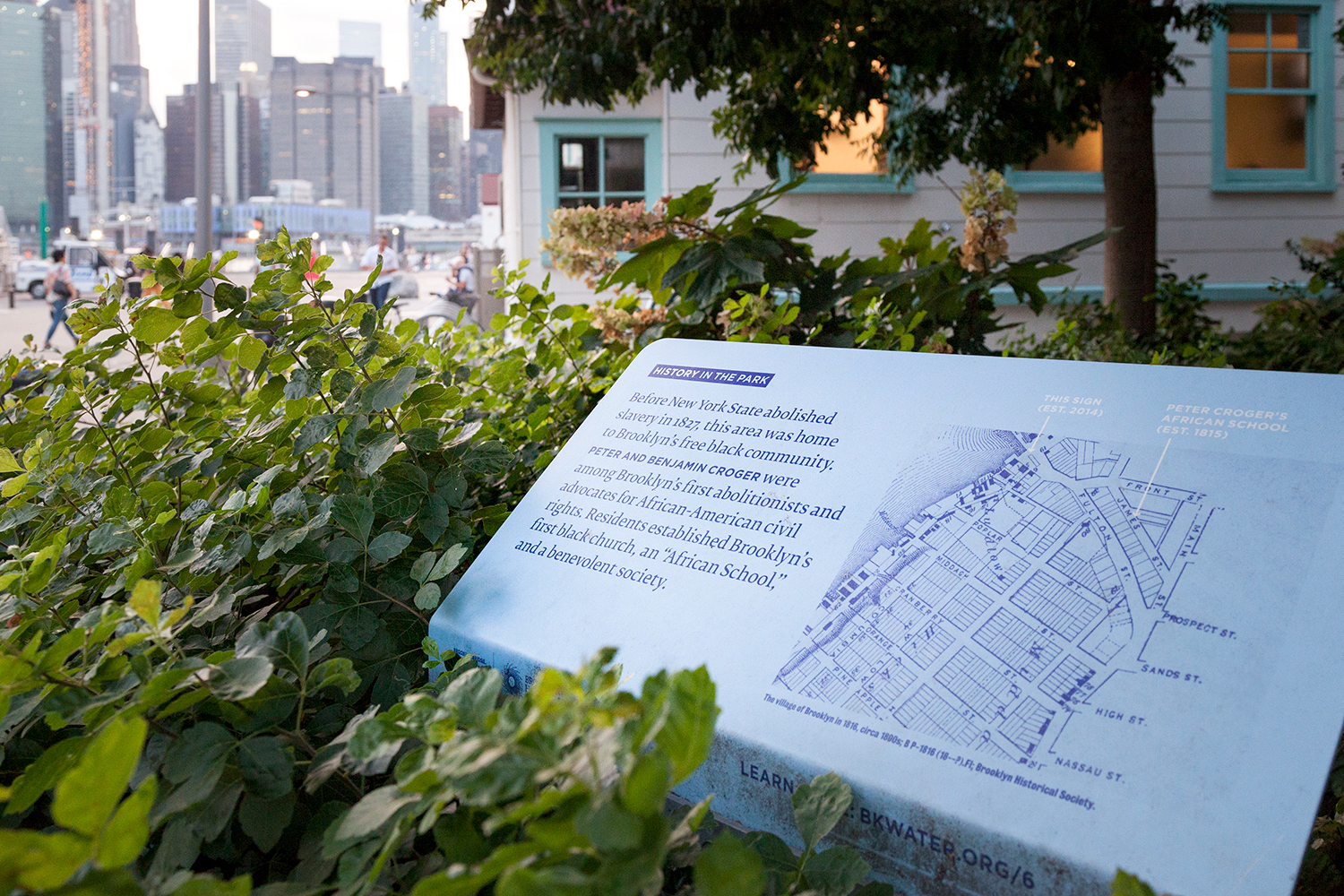
In 2014, the Brooklyn Historical Society helped create a series of signs marking points of historic significance throughout the park.

Brooklyn Bridge Park spans 85 acres (34 ha) of the East River waterfront in the Brooklyn Heights and Dumbo neighborhoods of Brooklyn. The park is divided into eleven sections: Piers 1 through 6; Fulton Ferry Landing; Brooklyn Bridge Plaza; Empire Fulton Ferry; Main Street; and John Street. Each of these sections features unique topographies, plantings, amenities, and cultural artifacts and installations, and the Brooklyn–Queens Greenway spans the park, as does the Brooklyn Waterfront Greenway.

The park includes engineering features such as a water garden used as a storm-reclamation system, a series of hills to block noise from the BQE, and several areas designed with microclimates. Several parts of the park have reused design features from the former warehouses, such as steel trellises and wood. The park's design includes 20 to 30 foot (6.1 to 9.1 m) high sound berms between Piers 2–5, which block noise from the BQE viaduct to the east. The berms were estimated to reduce the noise from the BQE from 75 decibels to 68 decibels, making sections of the park habitable for bird nesting The park also incorporates several natural habitats, which have attracted several wildlife species, including the native but now-rare two-spotted lady beetle.

According to landscape architects Michael Van Valkenburgh Associates, the park's design is "guided by the concept of 'post-industrial nature...[and] uses unabashedly man-made landscapes to kick-start new site ecologies that can thrive and evolve in a heavy-use urban setting." Above all, the park is meant to serve as a vital threshold connecting the city and the East River. "We realized this park wasn't about scenery," Van Valkenburgh said, "The nature of this park is the river." Van Valkenburgh associate Matthew Urbanski said, "We hope people rethink how to use public spaces after using this park."

=== Pier 1 and Fulton Ferry Landing ===
Pier 1 was the first section of parkland, having opened in March 2010. It is located directly south of the Brooklyn Bridge and the Empire–Fulton Ferry section of the park. The pier is Brooklyn Bridge Park's largest and is the only one constructed on filled land rather than pilings. The area includes two landscaped lawns overlooking the Brooklyn Bridge and New York Harbor, a salt marsh with native plants, a playground, a granite lookout, a waterfront walkway, and various food and drink concessions.

Fulton Ferry Landing is directly adjacent to Pier 1, on the site of Brooklyn's first ferry landing, which opened in 1642. Reopened to the public in 1997, Fulton Ferry Landing provides views of the Manhattan skyline and houses the classical music venue Bargemusic. The landing includes an old fireboat house, which formerly housed the Brooklyn Ice Cream Factory between 2001 and 2018. Since 2019, the fireboat house has been run by two concessionaires. The New York Water Taxi and NYC Ferry are also accessible from the landing. The landing contains railings upon which are engraved the Walt Whitman poem "Crossing Brooklyn Ferry", as well as a deck with bronze reliefs of historic events nearby. A pavilion adjacent to the fireboat house was proposed for Fulton Ferry Landing in 2019 but was delayed due to objections by the New York City Landmarks Preservation Commission. Emily Warren Roebling Plaza, a 2-acre (0.81-hectare) plaza underneath the Brooklyn Bridge, connects Pier 1 with the Empire–Fulton Ferry section of the park.

Squibb Park Bridge, a 450-foot-long (140 m) pedestrian bridge constructed in early 2013, connected Brooklyn Heights' Squibb Park to Pier 1, providing one of several links between Brooklyn Heights and Brooklyn Bridge Park. The bridge was designed to be lightweight and flexible, providing a bouncy feeling to visitors walking over it. However, the bridge bounced too much, and as a result, was closed for renovations in 2014 to strengthen the structure and allow ADA access. The renovations were completed in March 2017, but the bridge was closed again in July 2018, and park officials later decided to replace the wooden bridge with a steel replica. The original bridge was torn down in October 2019; the steel replica was completed in May 2020.

The entrance pavilion was finished in April 2025 and consists of three stone structures designed by Tod Williams Billie Tsien Architects. The structures are connected by a roof with photovoltaic panels, which has an oculus opening at its center. The pavilion is placed on a hill surrounded by ginkgo and honey locust trees, and the pavement around the pavilion is made of tiles in two colors.

==== Pierhouse and 1 Hotel ====
At the eastern edge of Pier 1 is a 108-unit condominium development called Pierhouse, as well as a 194-key hotel called 1 Hotel Brooklyn Bridge, both developed by Toll Brothers. The developments are designed to blend in with the park design and help pay for the park's maintenance, but both have been controversial. As originally stipulated in the master plan, the park was to be funded partially by the sale of housing units at the boundary of Pier 1. The 2005 draft environmental impact statement (EIS) proposed, among other things, a 110-foot (34 m) residential building that was to replace some warehouses. However, the final EIS was edited to make the building only 100 feet (30 m) high.

Construction on the projects began in 2013 after Toll Brothers won the competition to design the structures. Residents filed a lawsuit in 2014, claiming that the hotel's bulkheads exceeded the height limit for the site, but the lawsuit was dismissed the following June on the grounds that no rules were being violated. Construction on the Pierhouse units was stopped temporarily in January 2015 after its developers proposed raising the building's roof by 3.5 feet (1 m); opponents claimed that the development would block the view of the Brooklyn Bridge from the Brooklyn Heights Promenade. A lawsuit to prevent the completion of the Pierhouse was dismissed in September 2015, as was a subsequent lawsuit, in June 2016. The first residents of Pierhouse moved into the building in September 2016, and the 1 Hotel Brooklyn Bridge was opened the following February.

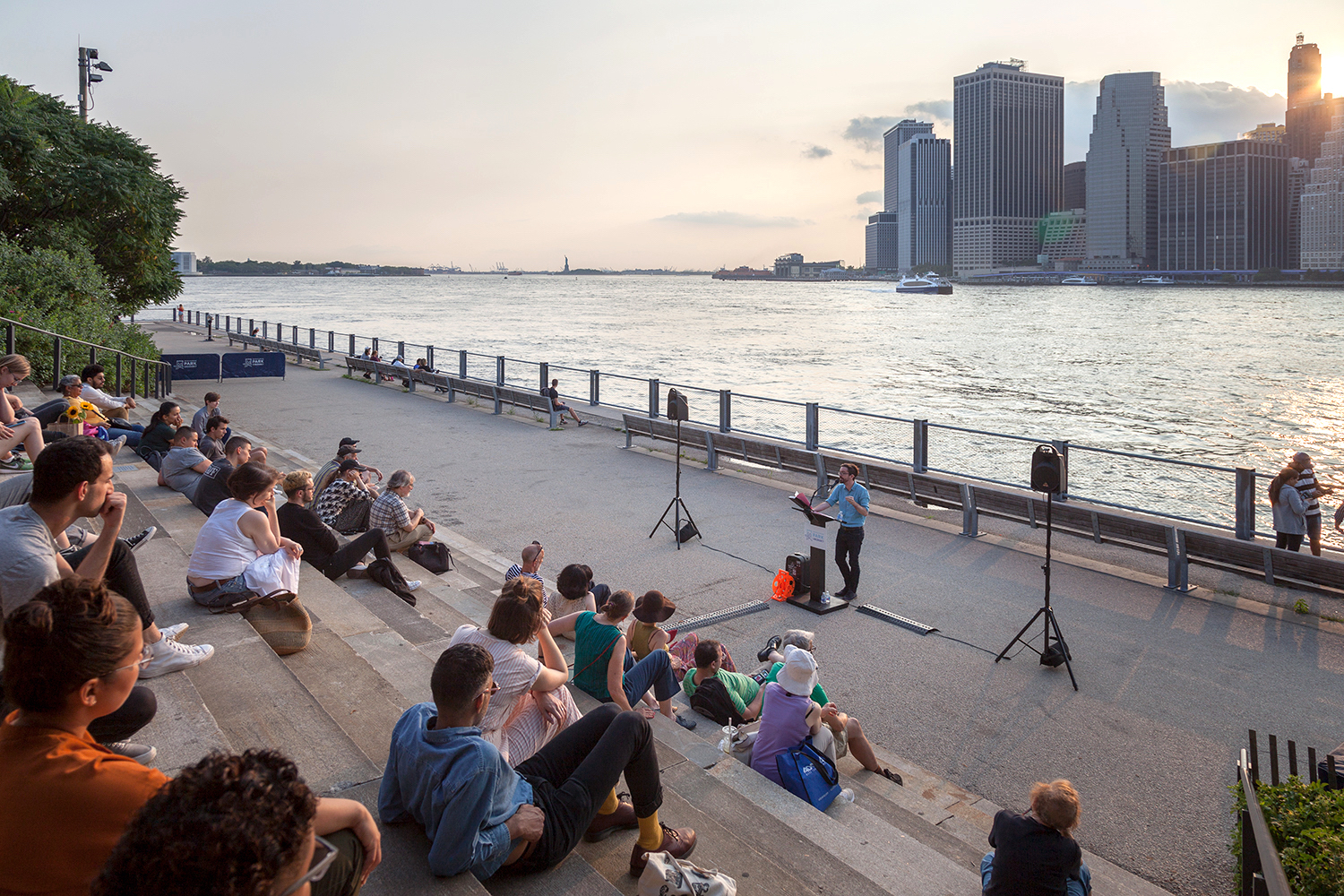
Books Beneath the Bridge reading at the Granite Prospect

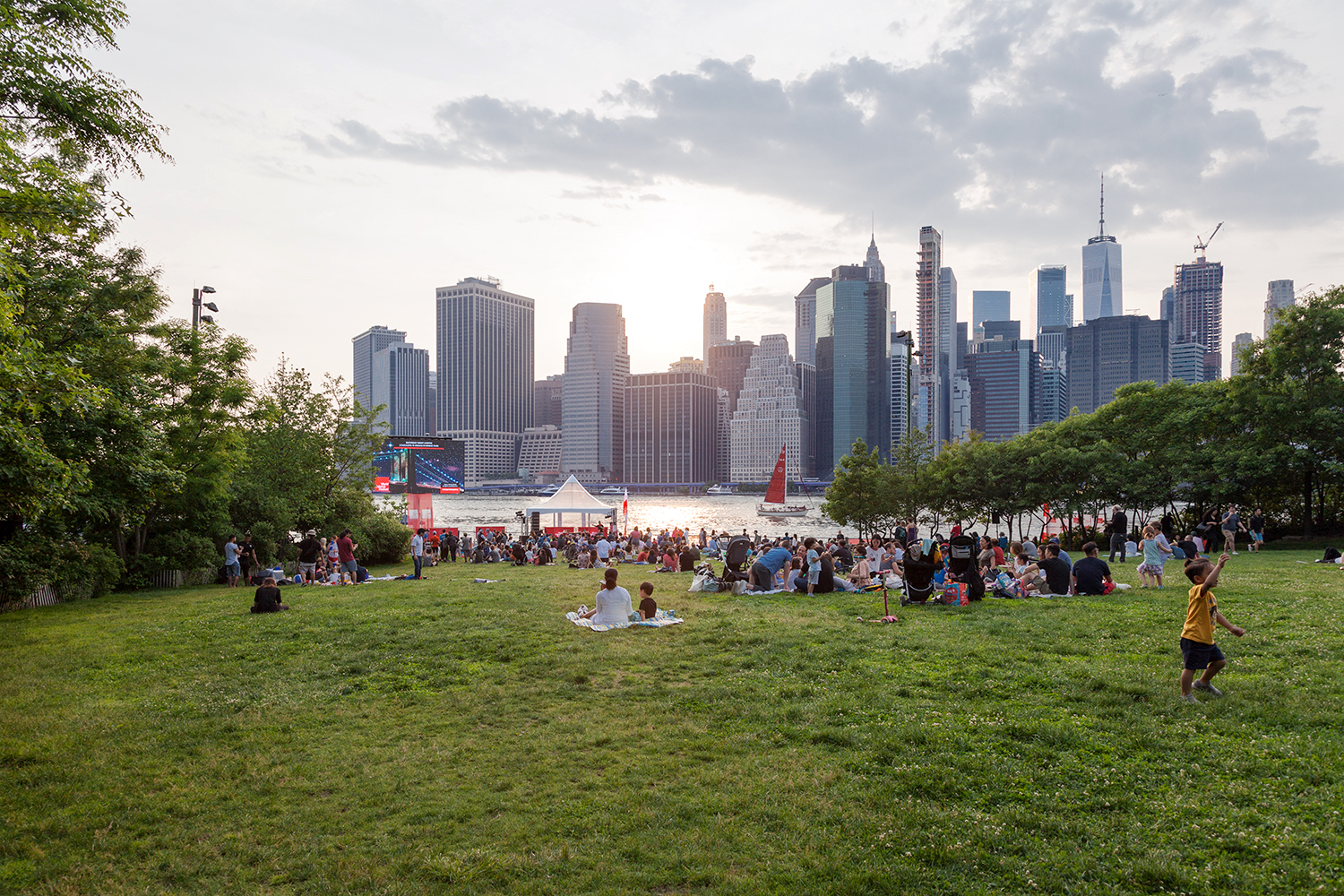
World Science Festival on Harbor View Lawn of Pier 1

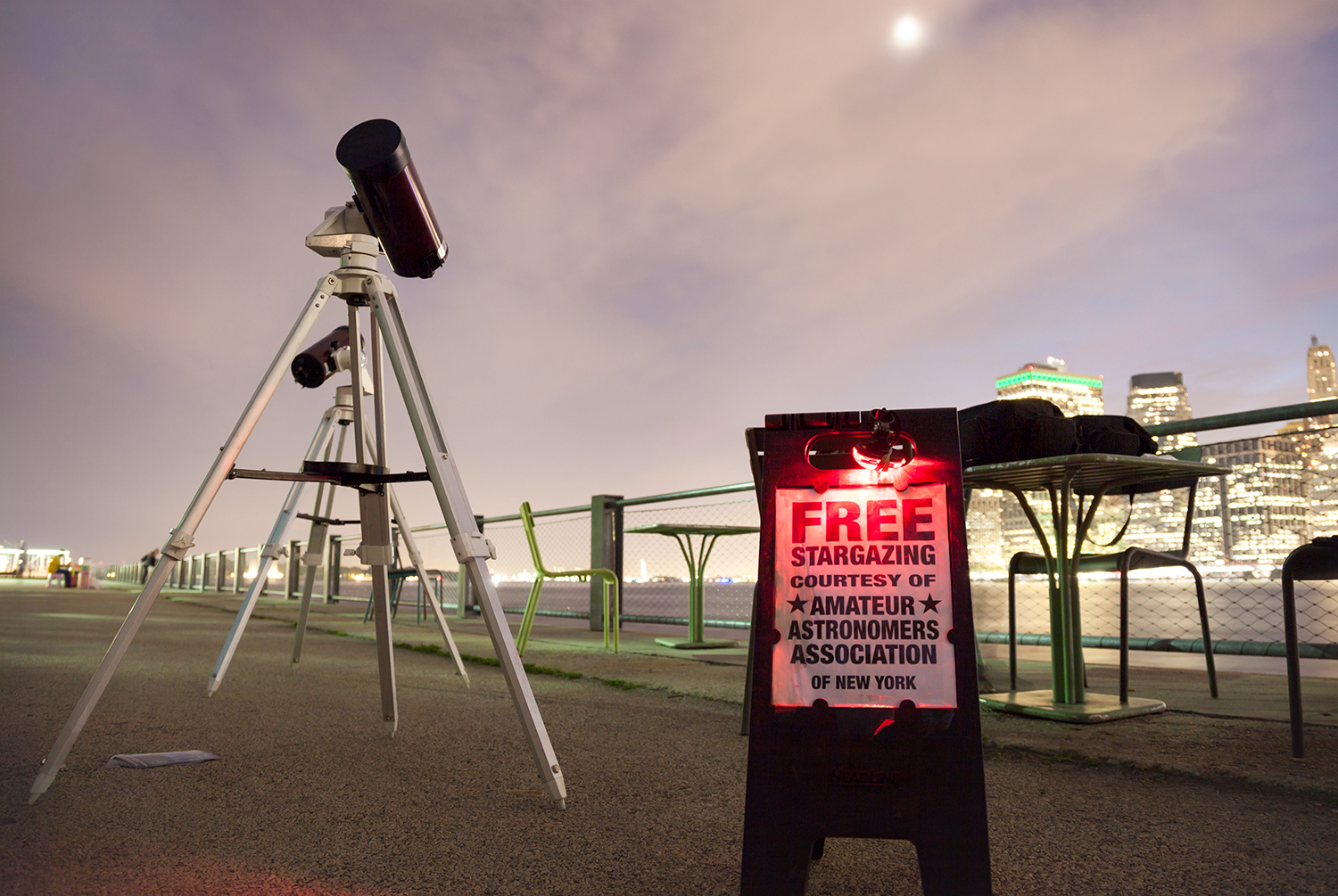
Free stargazing on Pier 1 sponsored by the Amateur Astronomers Association of New York

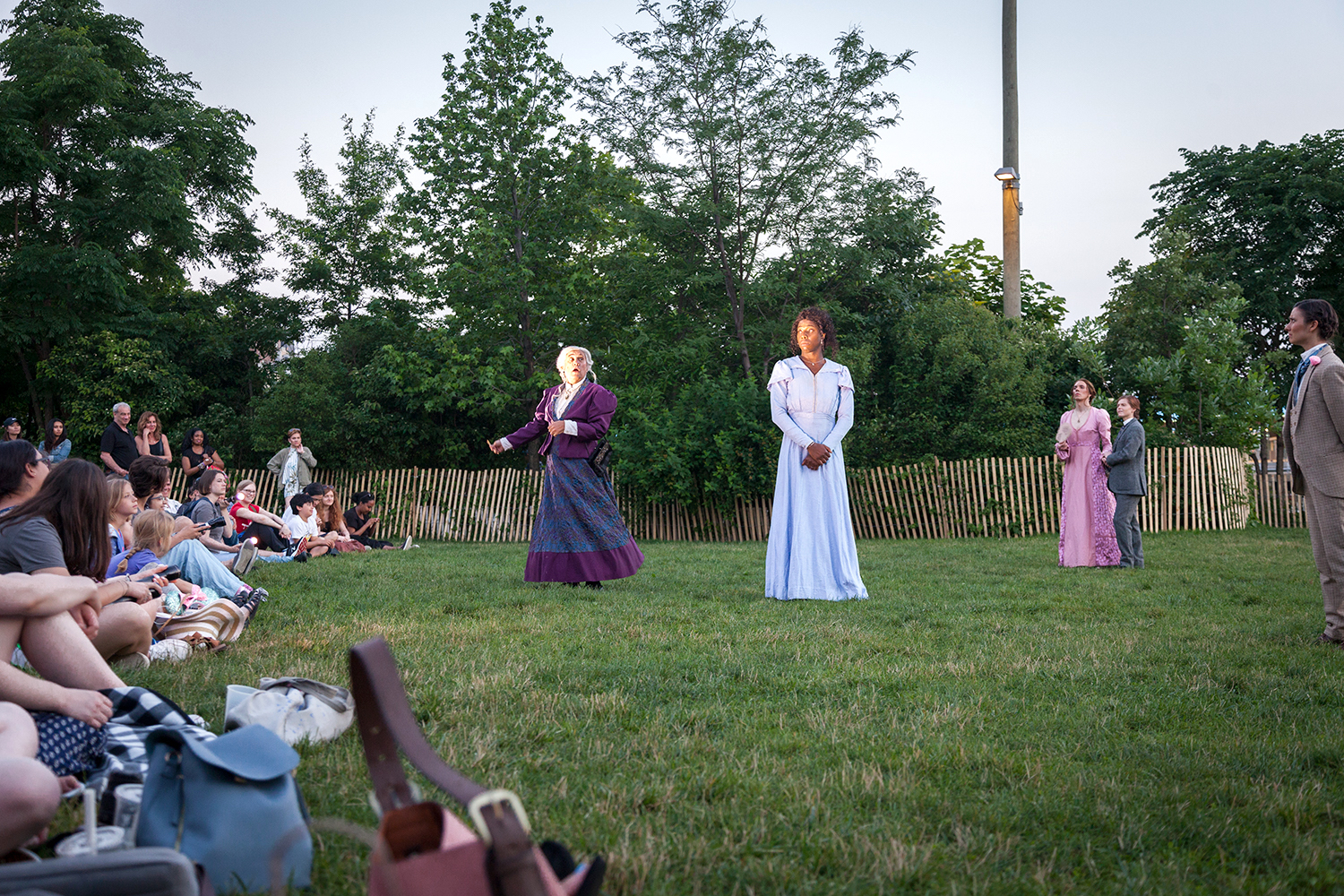
The Importance of Being Earnest performed by New York Classical Theatre on Harbor View Lawn

=== Pier 2 ===
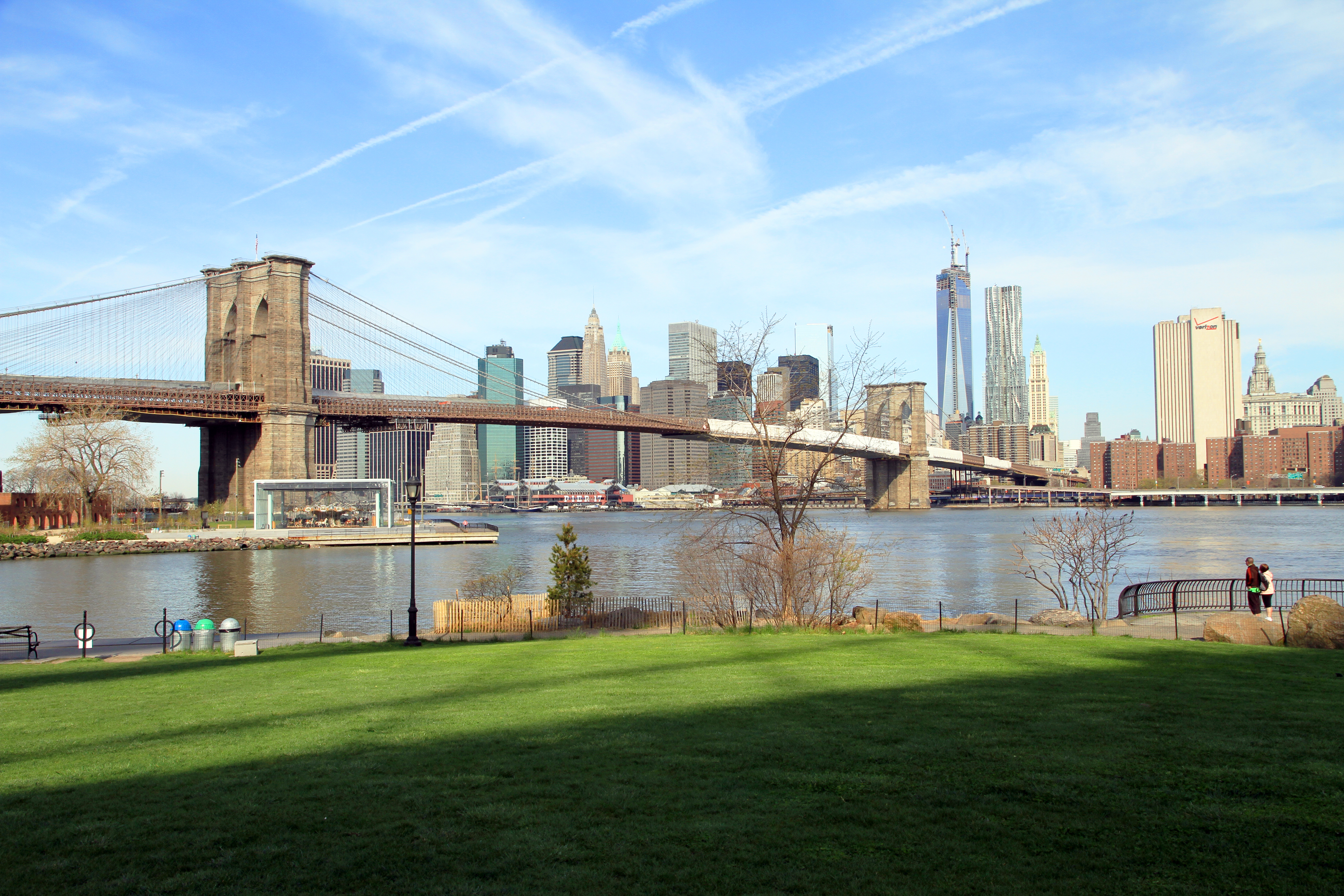
The Brooklyn Bridge and Financial District as seen from the park

A former warehouse dock, the 5-acre (2.0 ha) Pier 2 opened in May 2014 and is dedicated to active recreation. The pier is surrounded by a waterfront walkway and includes basketball, handball, bocce, pickleball, and shuffleboard courts; artificial turf; swings; fitness bars; and picnic tables. It also includes public restrooms, lockers, bike racks, and water fountains. A warehouse roof, preserved from when the pier was operated by the Port Authority, partially covers the pier. Additionally, Brooklyn Bridge Park Boathouse operates a free summer kayaking program within the covered inlet. There is also a roller rink on Pier 2.

From 2012 to 2018, a pop-up public swimming pool was placed at Pier 2 every summer. The temporary pool was originally slated to be demolished at the end of the 2016 summer season but was kept for two more years due to high demand and popularity. The pop-up pool closed by the end of the 2018 season and was demolished, to be replaced by the Pier 2 uplands, and construction has since stalled on a new permanent pool in nearby Squibb Park.

=== Pier 3 and Greenway Terrace ===
In November 2013, the Greenway Terrace opened on the shoreline adjacent to Pier 3. The terrace contains expansive lawns, a granite terrace, and the first sound-attenuating berm within the park. The granite terrace features salvaged granite blocks within planted areas, surrounded by trees. The granite was salvaged from reconstruction work on the Roosevelt Island Bridge and Willis Avenue Bridge. Working in partnership with NYC Parks, Brooklyn Bridge Park received surplus granite from the bridge reconstruction projects, adding to its sustainable features. Additionally, the Pier 3 berm was formed with salvaged material from the Metropolitan Transportation Authority's East Side Access tunneling project. The berm was also raised through the installation of foam blocks. The 20-foot-tall (6.1 m) berm was created to help mitigate noise from the nearby Brooklyn Queens Expressway, as well as sheltering the park from Furman Street and Brooklyn Heights.

Dahn Vo: We the People, a public art installation inspired by the Statue of Liberty, was on display on Pier 3 from May to December 2014. The sculpture was a copper replica of the statue in 250 parts fabricated over the course of four years using the original techniques and materials. Visitors to Brooklyn Bridge Park saw a replica of the draped sleeve of the statue's arm which holds the golden torch.

On October 20, 2016, construction started on Pier 3. The pier, which extends outward from Greenway Terrace, is 5 acres (2.0 ha) in area and contains the park's only lawn, a maze of mirrors, sound installations, climbable artifacts, and stone seating. It opened on July 11, 2018. The pier includes a playground with historic bollards preserved from the pier's original industrial use.

=== Pier 4 ===
Pier 4, completed in May 2014, was repurposed from a former railroad car float bridge that had rotted and sunk into the East River. Intended as a wildlife preserve, the pier is planted with native flora, and the beach contains seven tidal pools, some of which are open to the public. In addition, Pier 4 contains boat launches.

A nature preserve called Bird Island is located off the shore of Pier 4. Bird Island contains shrubs, grasses, and trees from salt habitats, as well as three tide pools as an added ecological element. An Osprey platform has been installed to attract large fishing birds. Rip rap stones surround the edge of the island to buffer the beach. Native birds started using the beach once it opened.

=== Pier 5 ===
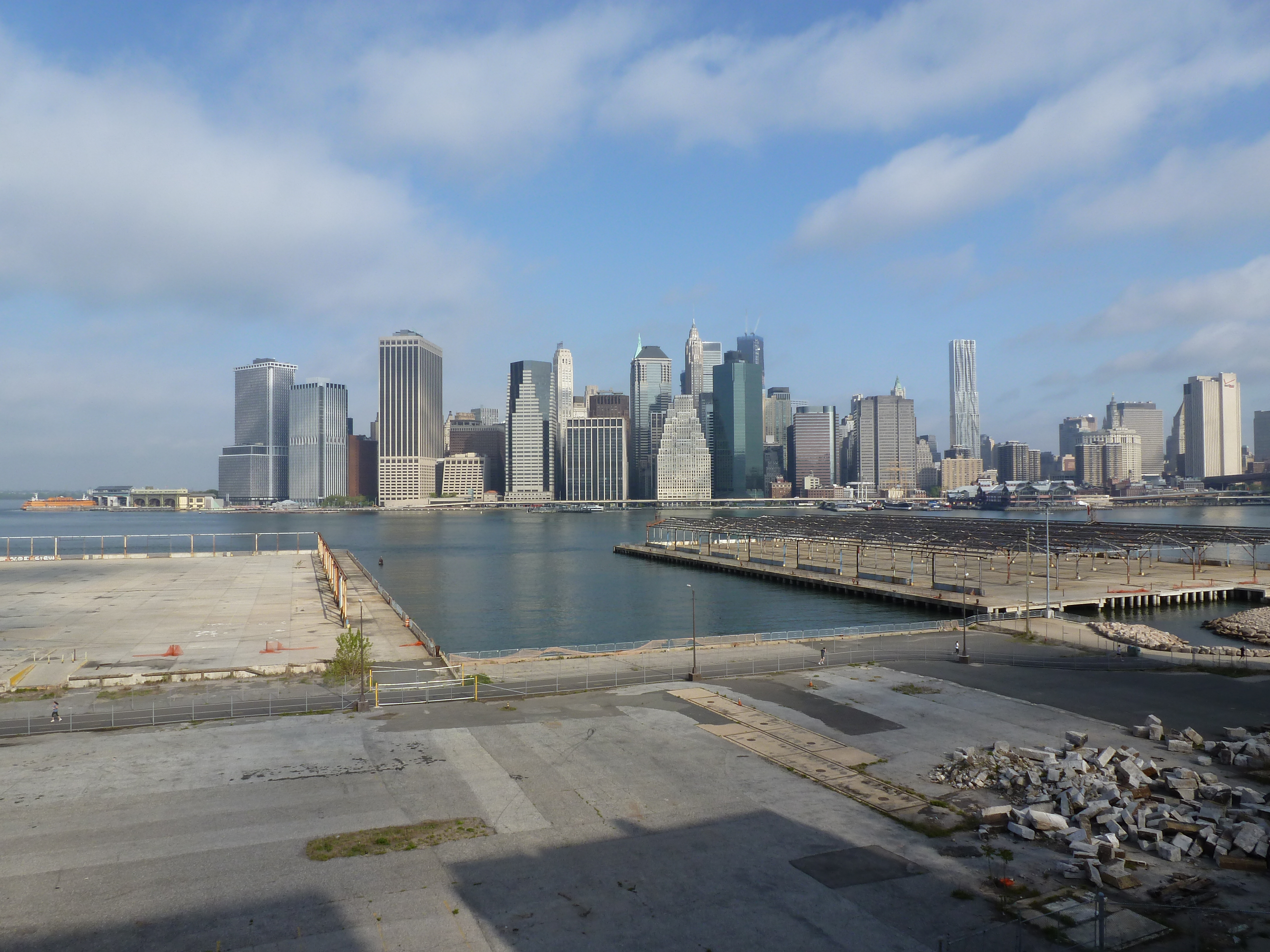
Pier 5 before renovation

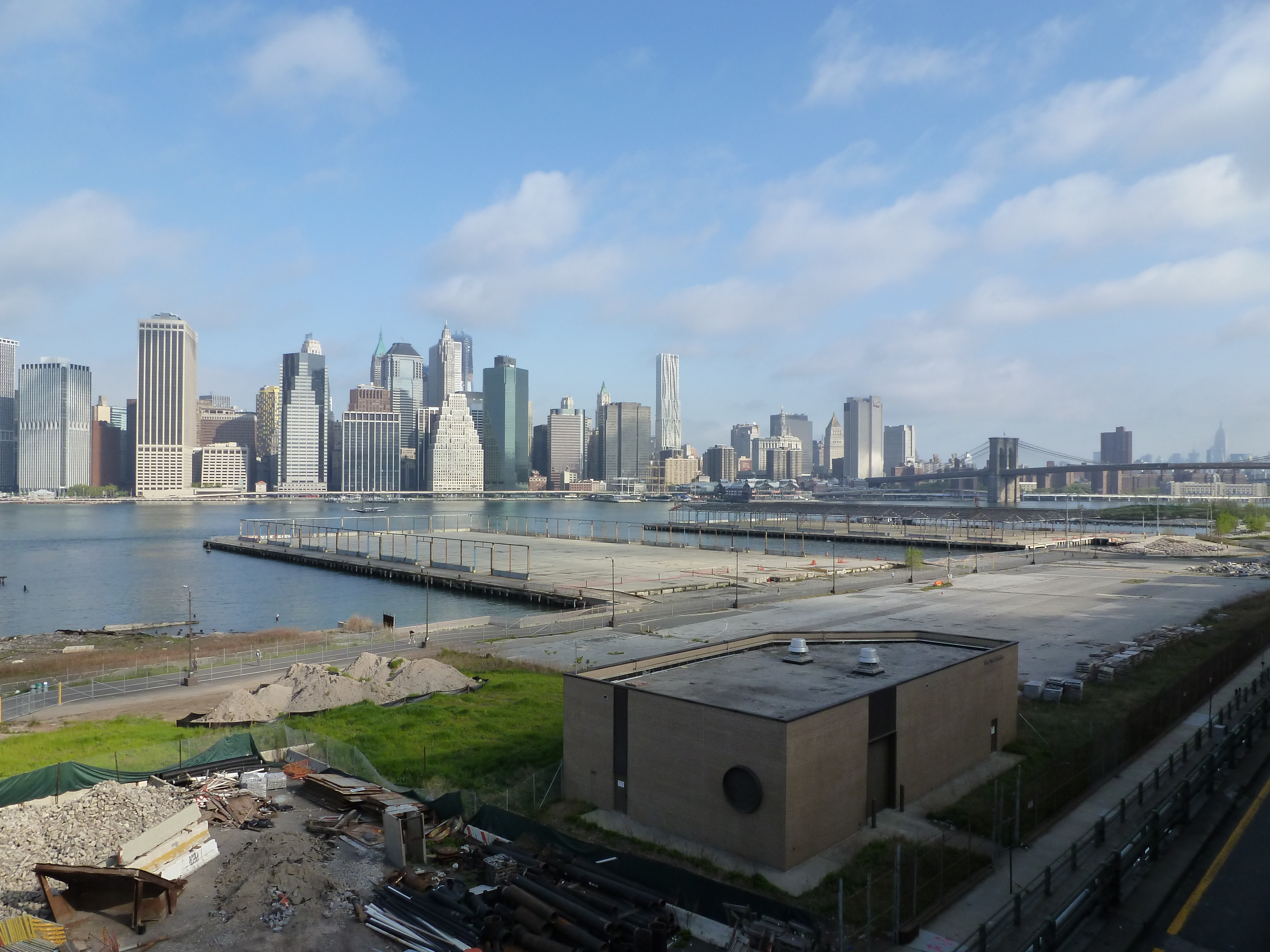
Piers 5 and 6 under construction (April 2012)

On December 13, 2012, Pier 5 officially opened with three athletic fields, two playgrounds and a picnic area, which cover 5 acres (2.0 ha) acres and cost $26 million to develop. The artificial turf fields can be used for soccer, lacrosse, Frisbee, cricket, and rugby by youth and adult leagues and by schools. St. Francis College started hosting its Division I men's soccer home games at Pier 5, and the first Division I game at Pier 5 was held on September 10, 2013. The inland portion of Pier 5 opened with 57 picnic tables, 24 grills, tetherball courts, and a child-size telescope. The Pier 5 uplands opened in June 2017. The tetherball courts and child-size telescope have since been removed. In May 2025, both playgrounds were renovated by the design firm Earthscape.

Pier 5 contains a marina, which originally opened in May 2016 under the ownership of One°15 Marina. Pier 5's marina was developed by Edgewater Resources, a marina construction and management company. There are 100 berths in the marina, as well as a floating dock. After reports of rough water conditions, a new wave-attenuation system was installed at the site and completed in May 2019. The community boating program offers free and low-cost kayaking, fishing, and sailing programs, and two percent of revenue is used to fund these programs. A boathouse near the marina was added in 2018, complete with public bathrooms and an indoor community space. Since 2025, Bargemusic has operated from the boathouse. In October 2024, One°15 Marina filed for Chapter 11 bankruptcy, putting the marina up for auction later that year. With a final bid of $3,500,000, Radcliff Management LLC took over ownership of the marina, now operating it as the Brooklyn Bridge Marina.

=== Pier 6 ===
In mid-2010, Pier 6, located at the intersection of Furman Street and Atlantic Avenue (at the site of South Ferry), was the second section of parkland to open. Pier 6 has a diverse array of amenities, including sand volleyball courts, concessionaires, a dog run, and plantings. The pier contains four themed playgrounds: Swing Valley, Slide Mountain, Sandbox Village, and Water Lab, which collectively span 1.6 acres (0.65 ha). Pier 6's flora is mostly composed of native plantings, which include a marsh garden as well as a 15,000-square-foot (1,400 m^{2}) lawn.

Pier 6's landscape occupies the outer two-thirds of the pier. Designed by Michael Van Valkenburgh Associates, it includes large lawns for events and programs and planted areas to complement the play areas on Piers 5 and 6. There is a shaded area for visitors. The landscaped area of Pier 6 opened in late 2015. The plan originally included a viewing platform at the northwest corner, designed by Bjarke Ingels Group. However, when the landscaped area opened, the proposed viewing platform had not yet been constructed because of a lack of funding. Several historic boats have been moored temporarily near Pier 6, but as of February 2020, the Brooklyn Bridge Park Corporation was seeking a boat for permanent display. New York Road Runners hosts a weekly 3.10-mile (4.99 km) Open Run at Pier 6.

At the eastern edge of Pier 6, there are three developments. The Landing, a 15-story affordable housing and market-rate apartment building with 140 units, and Quay Tower, a 28-story condo building with 126 units, both opened in 2018. One Brooklyn Bridge Park, a converted warehouse, is also located on Pier 6; it was completed in 2007 and contains 449 units.

Pier 6 has been positively regarded for the most part. However, there have been some complaints about the pier entrance's proximity to the BQE ramps, which have been described as a safety concern. In addition, in the park's early years, several groups unsuccessfully sued to prevent the development of the residential developments at Pier 6. Residents filed a lawsuit in August 2014 to try to stop these developments from being built, but a legal settlement in May 2015 allowed these towers to be built, with height restrictions.

=== Main Street ===
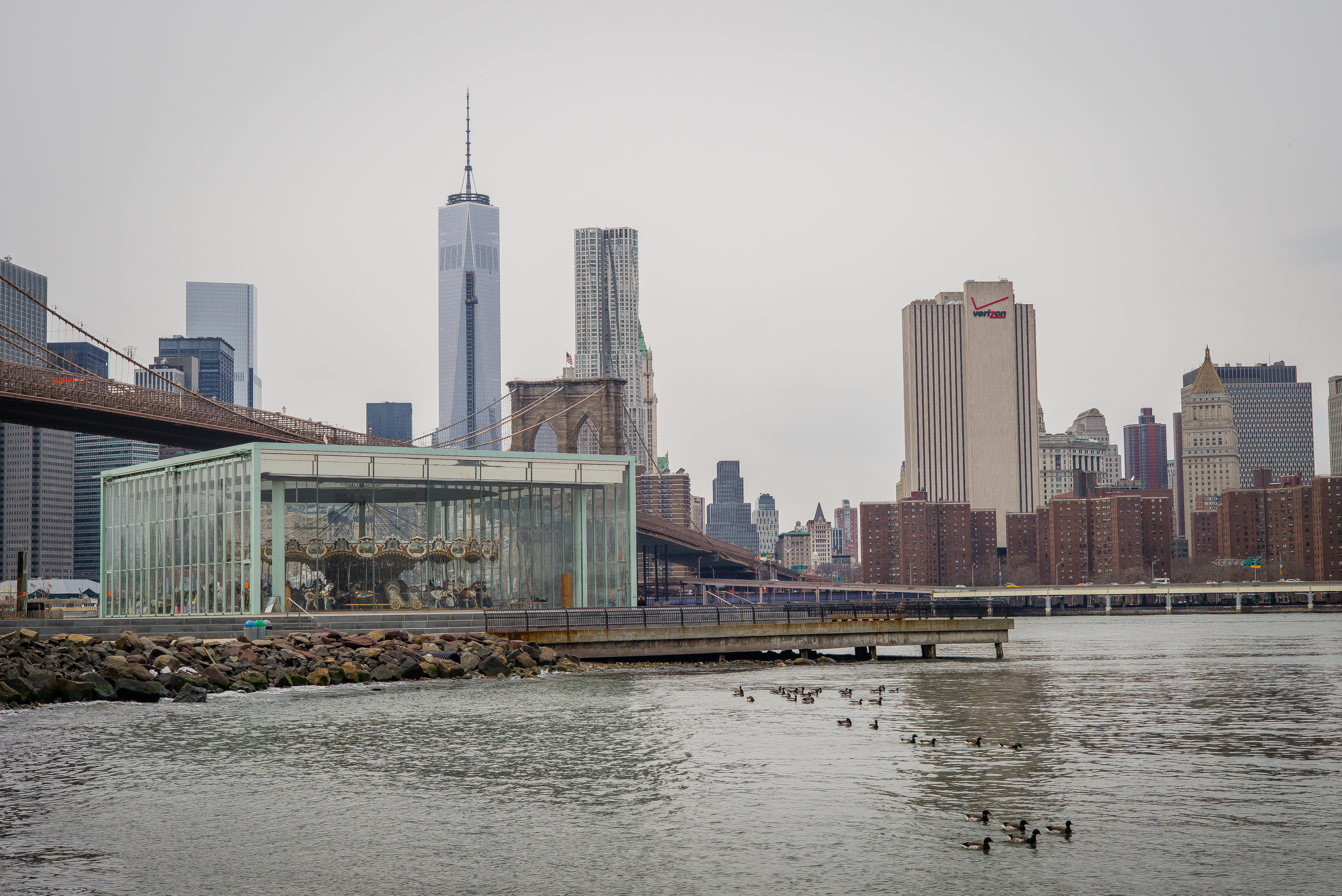
Jane's Carousel

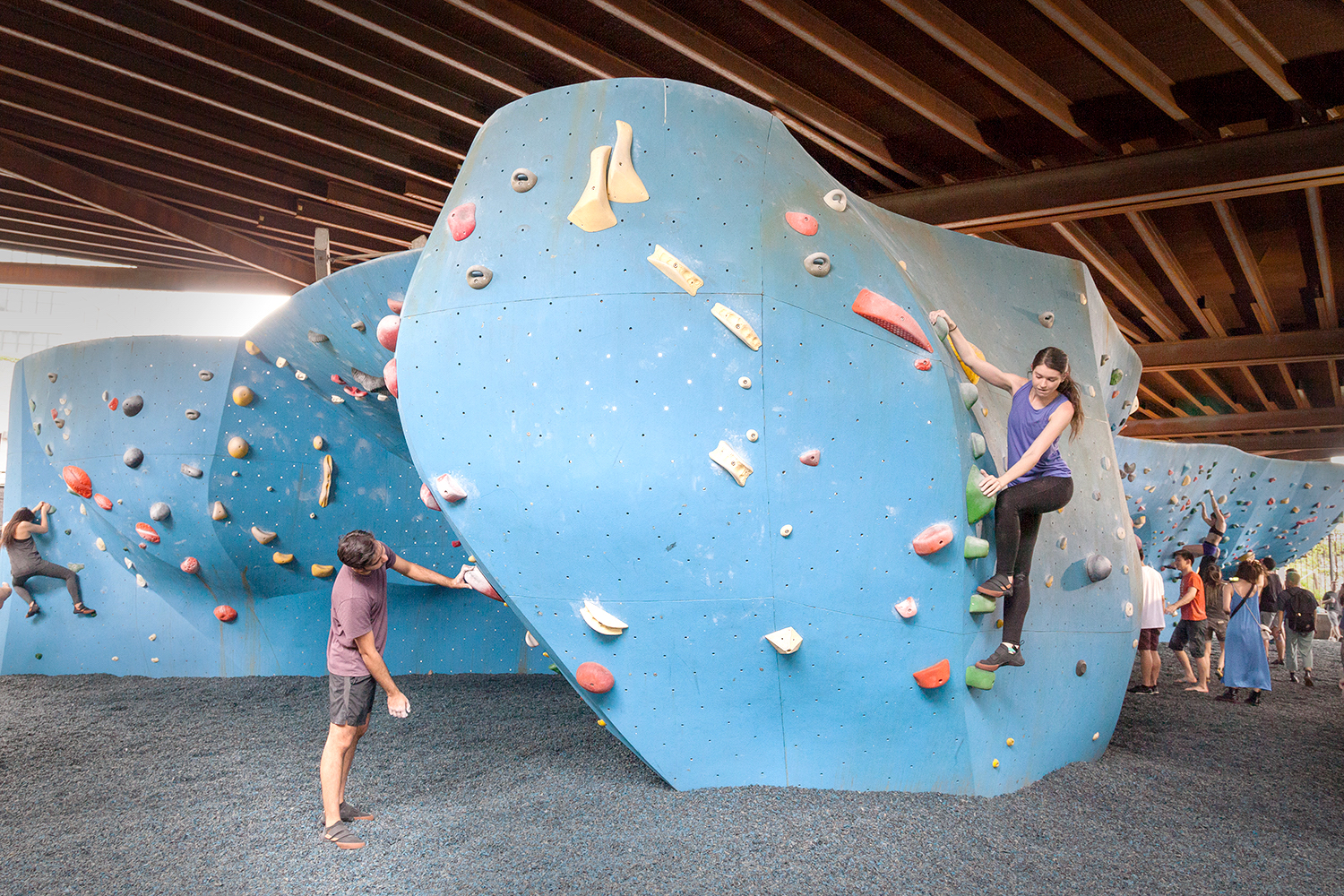
The Cliffs at DUMBO was located in the Main Street Section of Brooklyn Bridge Park

Spanning 4.8 acres (1.9 ha) of the easternmost section of parkland, underneath the Manhattan Bridge, Main Street opened in December 2002 and was originally operated by NYC Parks. It came under the jurisdiction of the Brooklyn Bridge Park Corporation on December 1, 2010. Main Street features a nautical-themed playground, 99 Plymouth Street, a dog run and expansive lawns that provide views of the Manhattan skyline.

The Main Street portion of the park was renovated in 2015. The Main Street renovation included an expanded lawn, an upgraded dog run, improved pedestrian and bicycle circulation, an entry plaza at Washington Street and a rock climbing wall. The project also entailed the construction of John Street Park, which includes a 13,000-square-foot (1,200 m^{2}) lawn, pathways and a salt marsh. In April 2016, a company called the Cliffs opened DUMBO Boulders, a bouldering area at Main Street. With a capacity of 250 climbers, it was the largest bouldering facility in North America when it opened. In April 2025, the park began formalizing plans for a new community recreation center at the site of the now closed DUMBO Boulders.

==== 99 Plymouth Street ====
Renovated during the Main Street reconstruction in 2015, the multi-use building is currently home to the Environmental Education Center, public bathrooms, and office spaces. The Environmental Education Center hosts free programing year-round, and contains a custom-built "Discovery Station" with a 3D map of the park. The center is also home to multiple aquariums and terrariums containing local wildlife, including an assortment of fish, snakes, turtles, and frogs. In Spring 2028, the Environmental Education Center is scheduled move to a renovated location at 334 Furman Street.

=== Empire–Fulton Ferry ===
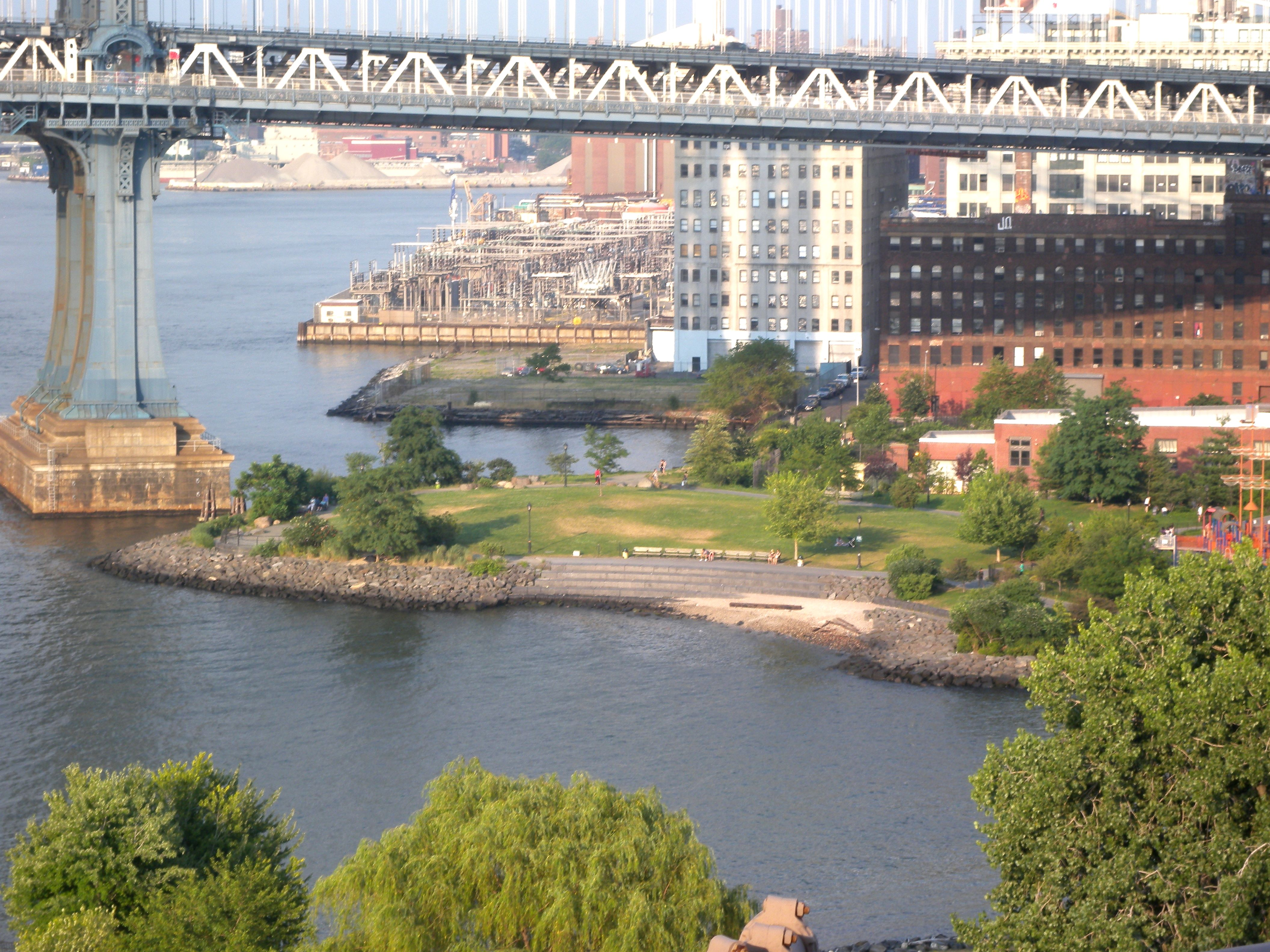
Empire-Fulton Ferry section looking north

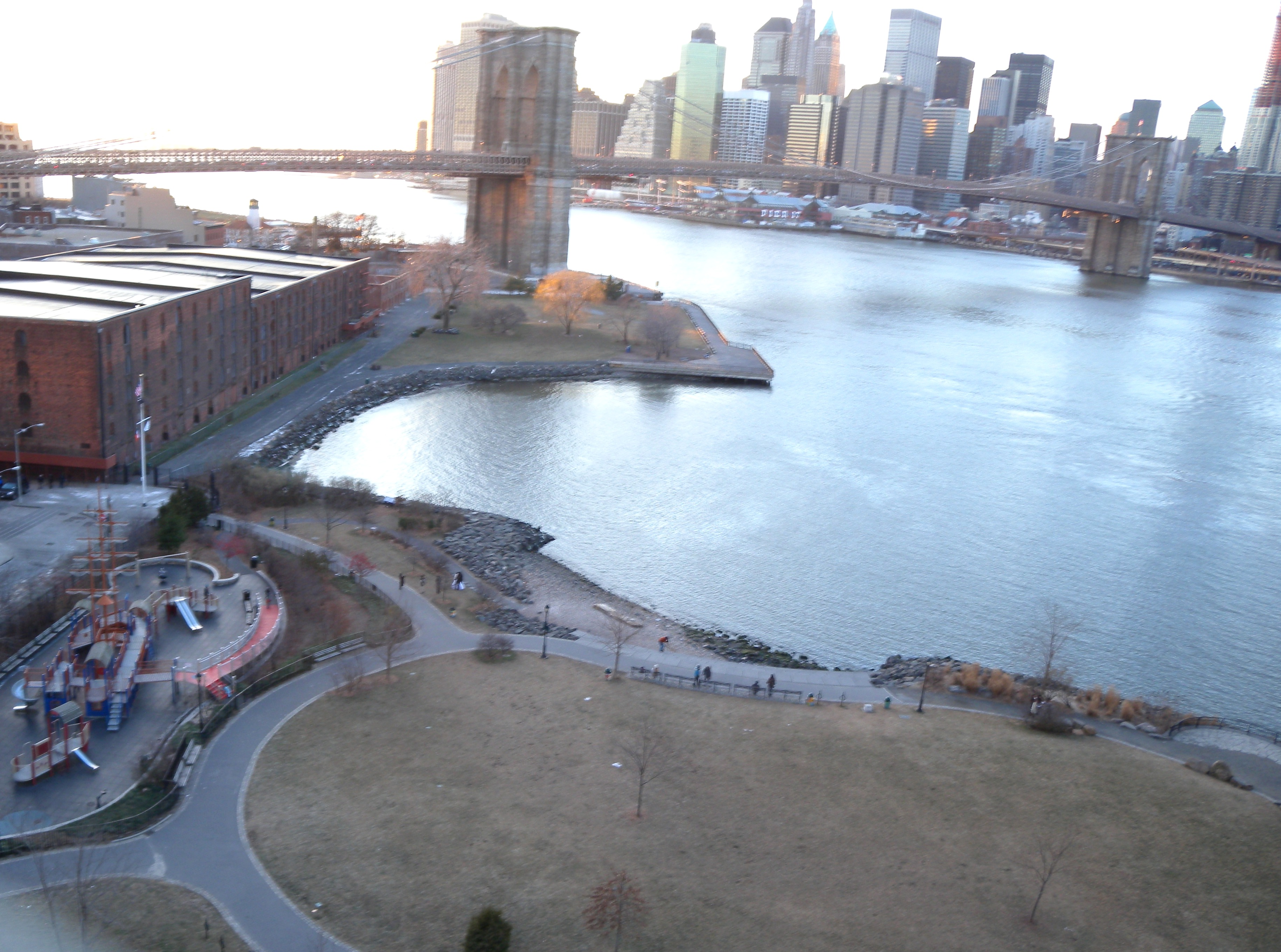
Empire-Fulton Ferry section looking south. The Empire Stores can be seen here.

The Empire–Fulton Ferry section of the park is 4.5 acres (1.8 ha) of waterfront parkland that is directly adjacent to Main Street to the west. It connects to Pier 1 to the south. This part of the park was formerly a state park, but was incorporated into Brooklyn Bridge Park in 2010. It contains a lawn with picnic areas, as well as a promenade facing the East River. Two Civil-War era structures, the Tobacco Warehouse and Empire Stores, are located on the site; both are listed on the National Register of Historic Places.

==== Tobacco Warehouse ====
Until 2010, the Tobacco Warehouse, which lacked a roof, was part of the Empire–Fulton Ferry State Park. That year, the National Park Service (NPS) designated St. Ann's Warehouse, a venue for theater and community use located across the street, as the lessee for the Tobacco Warehouse. The proposed agreement came with stipulations since the park had received some federal funding. The city redrew the zoning maps thus situating the warehouse on city property, leading to a lawsuit by opponents. The NPS's move to designate St. Ann's as the lessee for the warehouse was revoked by court order in 2011. The following year, the city reached an agreement where it would give the warehouse to St. Ann's in exchange for constructing an additional 1 acre (0.40 ha) of parkland underneath the Brooklyn Bridge.

A design for the theater was revealed in 2013. In its roofless state, the Tobacco Warehouse was shaped like a trapezoid, composed of a rectangle and adjacent triangle. Marvel Architects designed a 18,000-square-foot (1,700 m^{2}) enclosed performance space; a 1,000-square-foot (93 m^{2}) community area; and various rooms for community, educational, and office use. The design called for the preservation of the building's original brick walls, and for the creation of a 7,600-square-foot (710 m^{2}) roofless landscaped area in the warehouse's triangular section, which would serve both as a publicly accessible park space and as an entrance to the theater. The warehouse opened in 2015.

==== Empire Stores ====
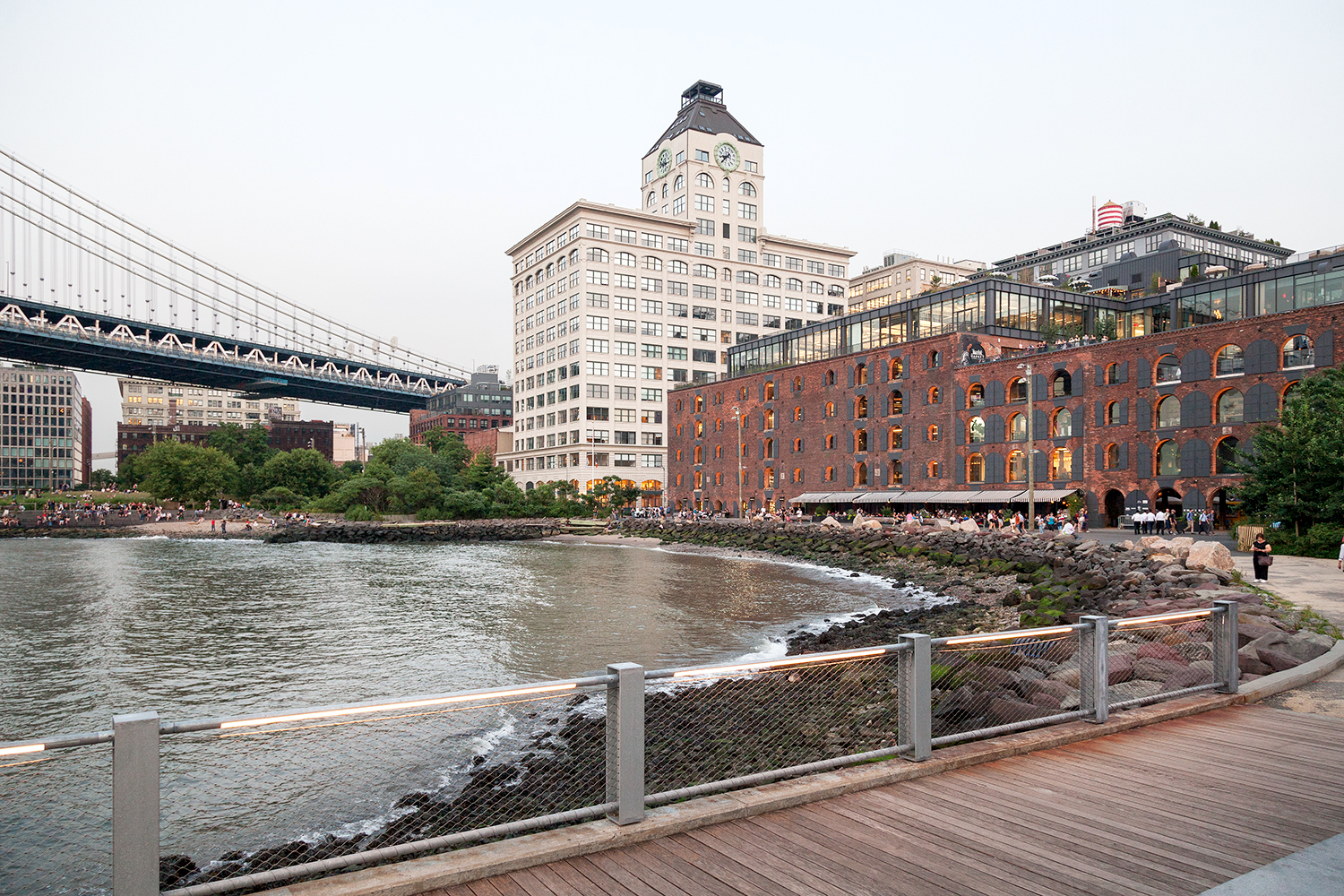
View of Empire Stores from Empire Fulton Ferry boardwalk

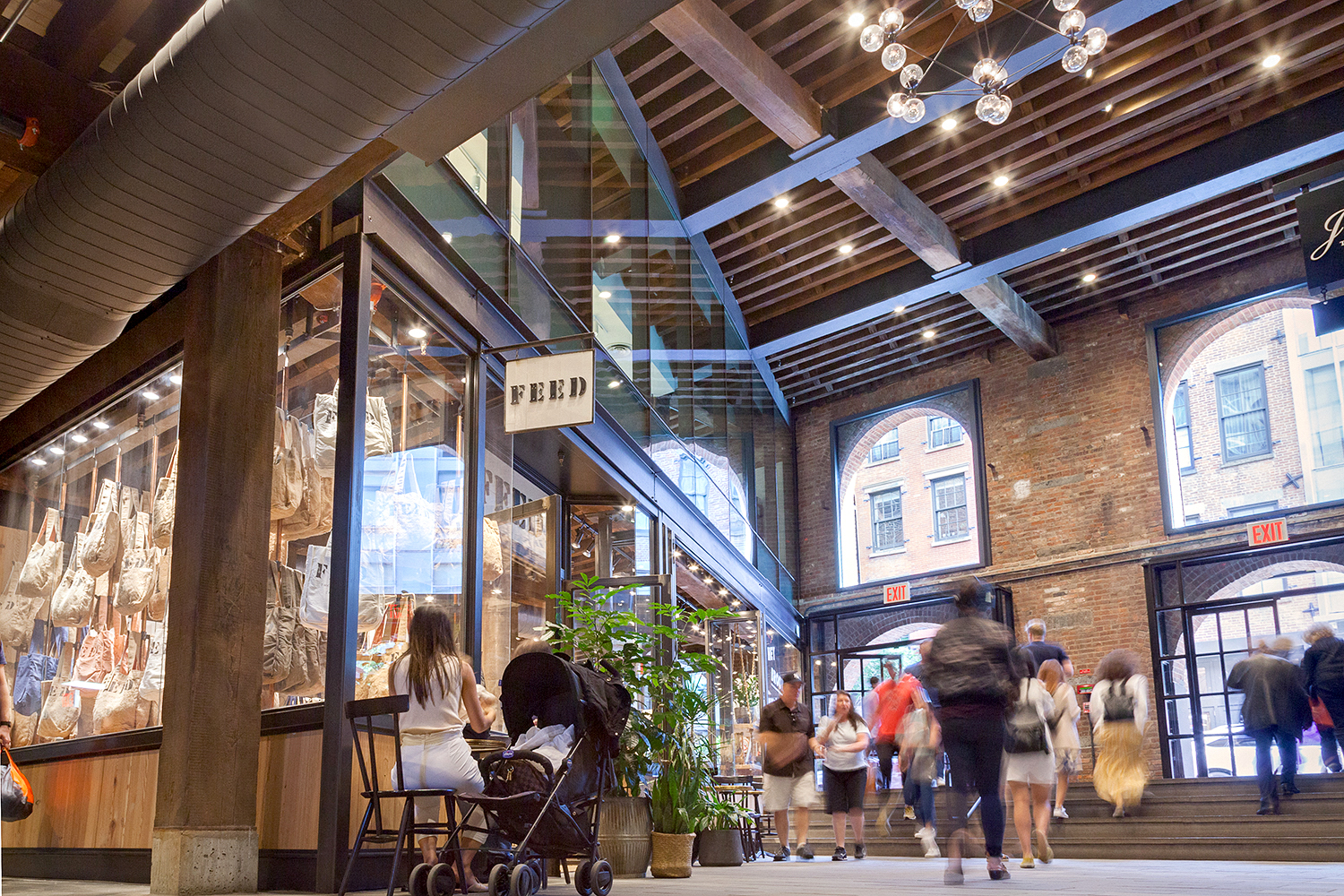
Center passageway of Empire Stores connecting Water Street to the open-air courtyard by the waterfront

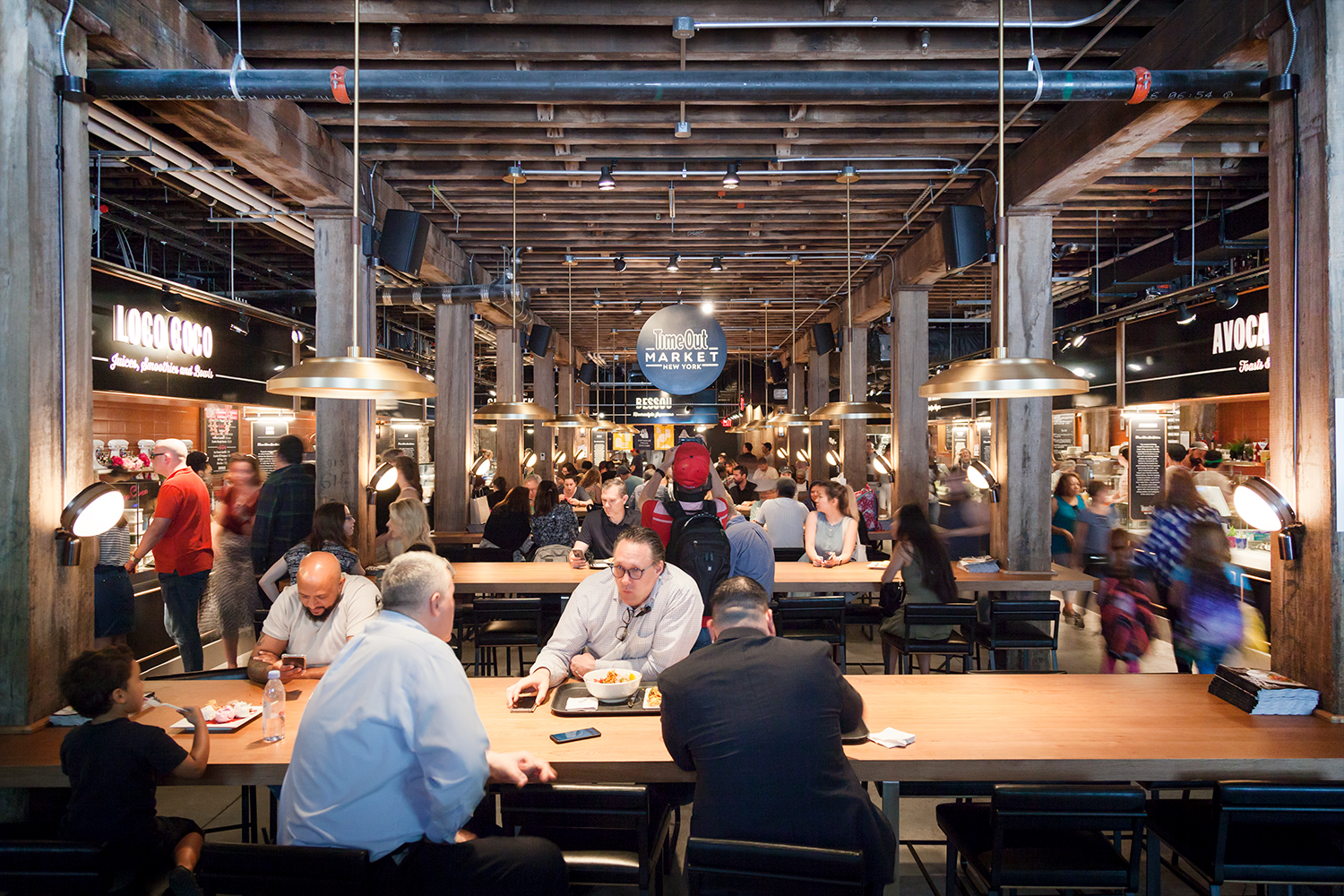
Main dining hall of Time Out Market in Empire Stores

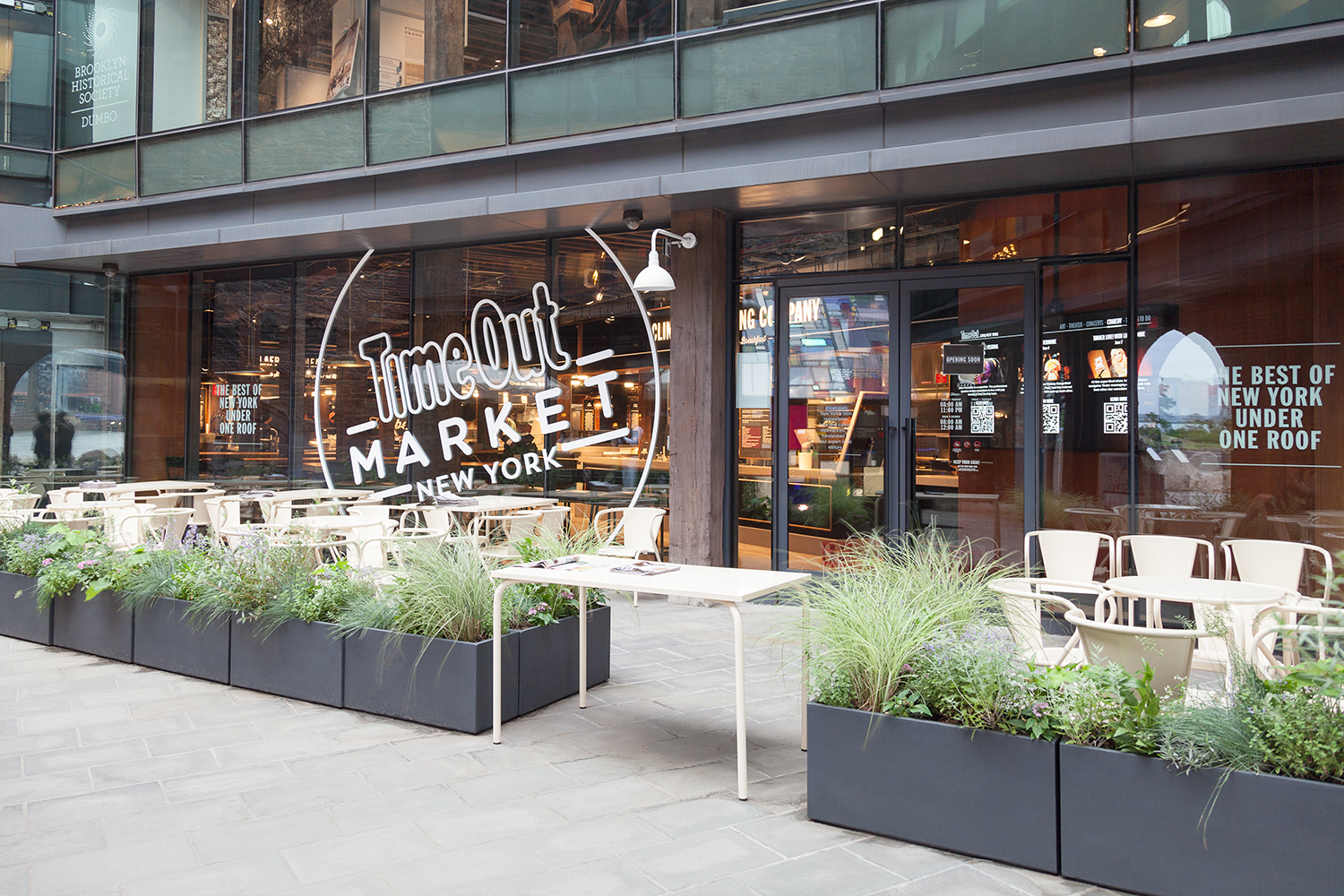
Time Out Market's outdoor dining area in courtyard

Empire Stores comprises seven buildings with a total of 330,000 square feet (31,000 m^{2}) of space. In 2013, Brooklyn developer Midtown Equities was selected to redevelop the abandoned Empire Stores warehouses into a mix of commercial and office space, designed by Studio V Architecture. The plan contained commercial and office space; restaurants and event areas; and a publicly accessible central passageway, courtyard, and rooftop. Many of the original design features were retained, such as schist walls, iron hoisting wheels, and coffee chutes. Midtown Equities originally intended to open Empire Stores in 2015. The flagship West Elm store, opened in August 2016, was the first tenant to open in Empire Stores, followed by the Brooklyn Historical Society's Dumbo exhibition space in May 2017. Upon the opening of other shops, Empire Stores' waterfront location quickly became a popular spot for selfies, especially those with the Brooklyn Bridge in the background.

==== Western Area ====
After reconstruction, the western part of the park opened in mid-2011 with new park plantings, improved lighting and the restored Jane's Carousel donated by David and Jane Walentas as a gift to the park. It is housed in an acrylic and steel pavilion designed by French architect Jean Nouvel, which opened September 15, 2011. The carousel is maintained and operated by the nonprofit Friends of Jane's Carousel.

In October 2016, a large, 9-by-12-foot (2.7 by 3.7 m) sign with the word "DUMBO" on it was placed in the John Street area of the park. The sign, called the DUMBO Reflector, is created by neighborhood artist David Crumley. The interactive sign allows for people in the area to use hashtags to interact with the sign's displays.

==== Emily Warren Roebling Plaza ====
Named after Emily Warren Roebling, the de facto engineer who oversaw the completion of the Brooklyn Bridge, the plaza opened on December 9, 2021. Located underneath the Brooklyn Bridge, the roughly 2-acre (0.81 ha) section consists of a large hardscape surface designed with concrete pavers that mimic the bridge above, surrounded by landscaped trees and shrubbery. The opening of the plaza marked the completion of the original plan for Brooklyn Bridge Park, joining together the northern Empire-Fulton Ferry, Main Street, and John Street sections of the park with the southern piers.

In November 2023, the park opened Glide Rink, a seasonally constructed ice-skating rink in the plaza. The following year, the rink was renamed to Roebling Rink. The rink is generally operated from mid-November through January. In the Spring, the plaza is home to the Photoville Festival.

The River Café is located in the western part of the Empire–Fulton Ferry section, directly southwest of the Brooklyn Bridge and north of Pier 1. Located just off Water Street, along the southern edge of Emily Warren Roebling Plaza, is Luke's Lobster.

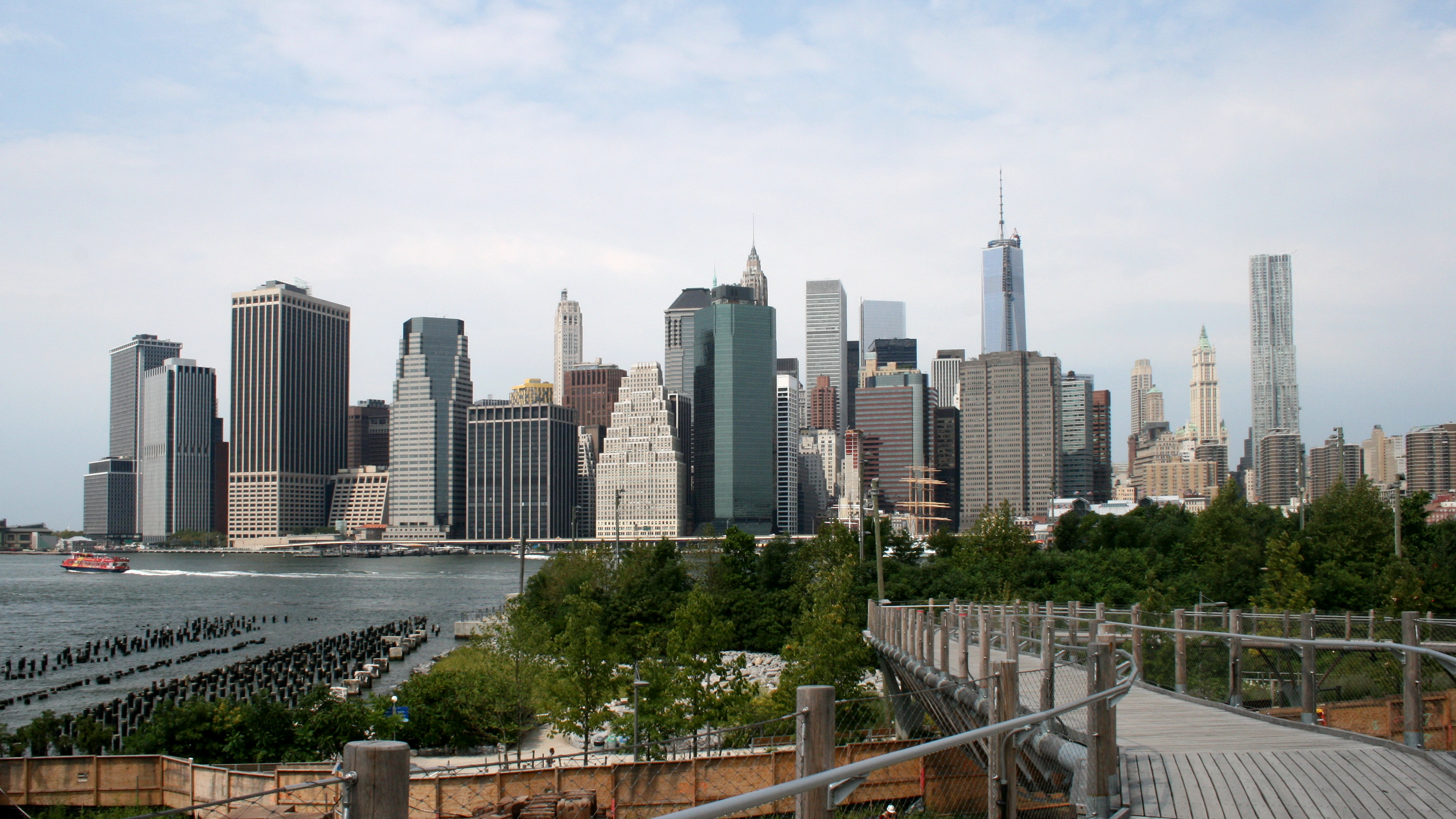
Manhattan skyline viewed from Brooklyn Bridge Park

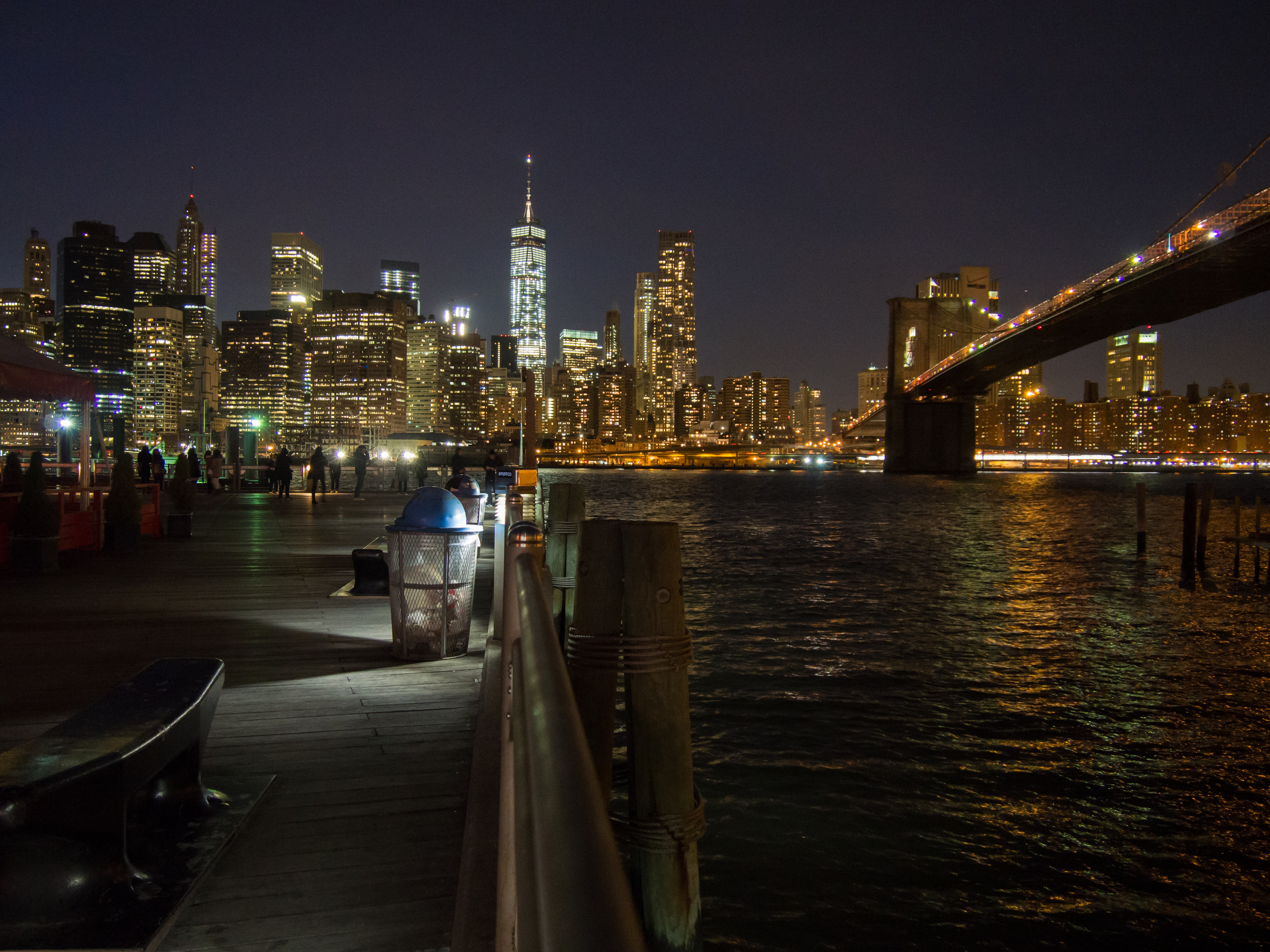
Night view of one of the piers

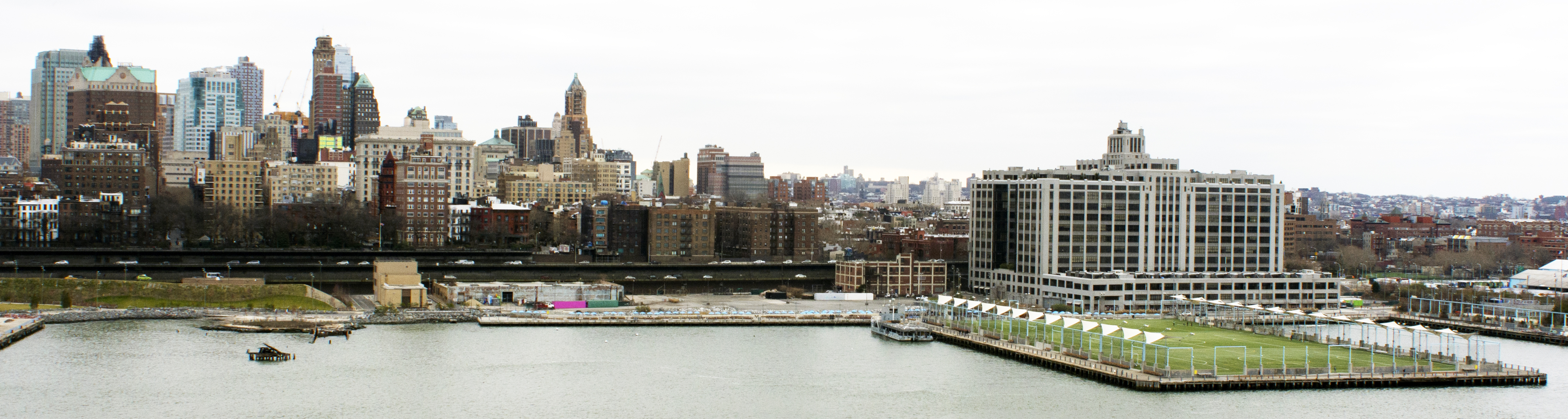
Park and promenade viewed from Manhattan

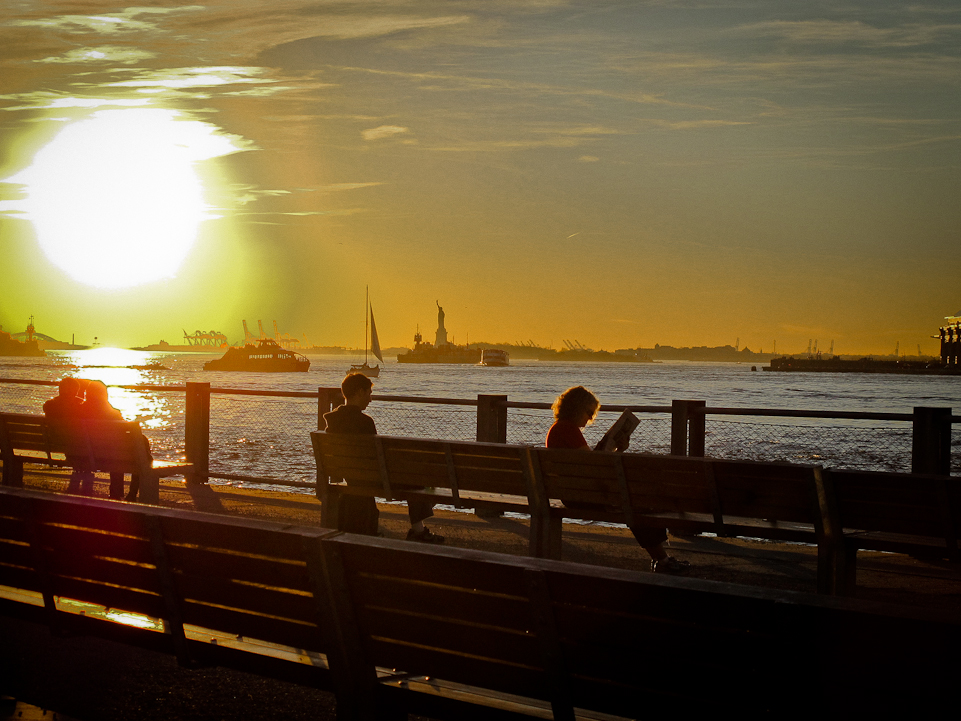
Statue of Liberty viewed from the park

== Transportation ==
The B61 and B63 buses serve the southern sections of the park, while the B25 bus serves the northern sections. The closest New York City Subway station is at Clark Street and Henry Street on the IRT Broadway–Seventh Avenue Line, which is served by the 2 and 3 trains. The subway tunnel runs underneath Pier 2, and its path can be approximated by the absence of pilings under the pier. Also within the park, two canals mark the location of the Cranberry Street Tunnel, used by the A and C trains. Brooklyn Bridge Park's Piers 1 and 6 have been served by NYC Ferry's South Brooklyn route since 2017. NYC Ferry's East River route also serves Pier 1.

== See also ==
- Brooklyn Heights Promenade
- List of New York City parks
- Park Conservancy
- NYC Department of Parks and Recreation
- Billion Oyster Project
- 10-Minute Walk
