= Haitian Women For Haitian Refugees =

- Established: 1992
- Website: haitianrefugees.org

Haitian Women for Haitian Refugees is a non-profit organization based in Brooklyn, New York City. Founded by Ninaj Raoul and Dr. Marie Lily Cerat, it was formed in response to the Haitian refugee crisis that occurred after the coup d'état of Haitian President Jean-Betrand Aristide headed by Lieutenant General Raoul Cédras in September 30, 1991. After this coup, Haitians began fleeing the country to the U.S among other places.The U.S Coast guard began detaining Haitians at the U.S naval base at Guantanamo Bay. Ninaj Raoul and Marie Cerat were interpreters for the Immigration and Naturalization Service in Guantanamo Bay. After their time in Guantanamo and return to the U.S they began the organization after the shock of the conditions of recently arrived Haitians who were be transitionally housed in the St. George Hotel in Brooklyn Heights.
