= 115-119 Eighth Avenue (Brooklyn) =

115–119 Eighth Avenue (Adams Residence)
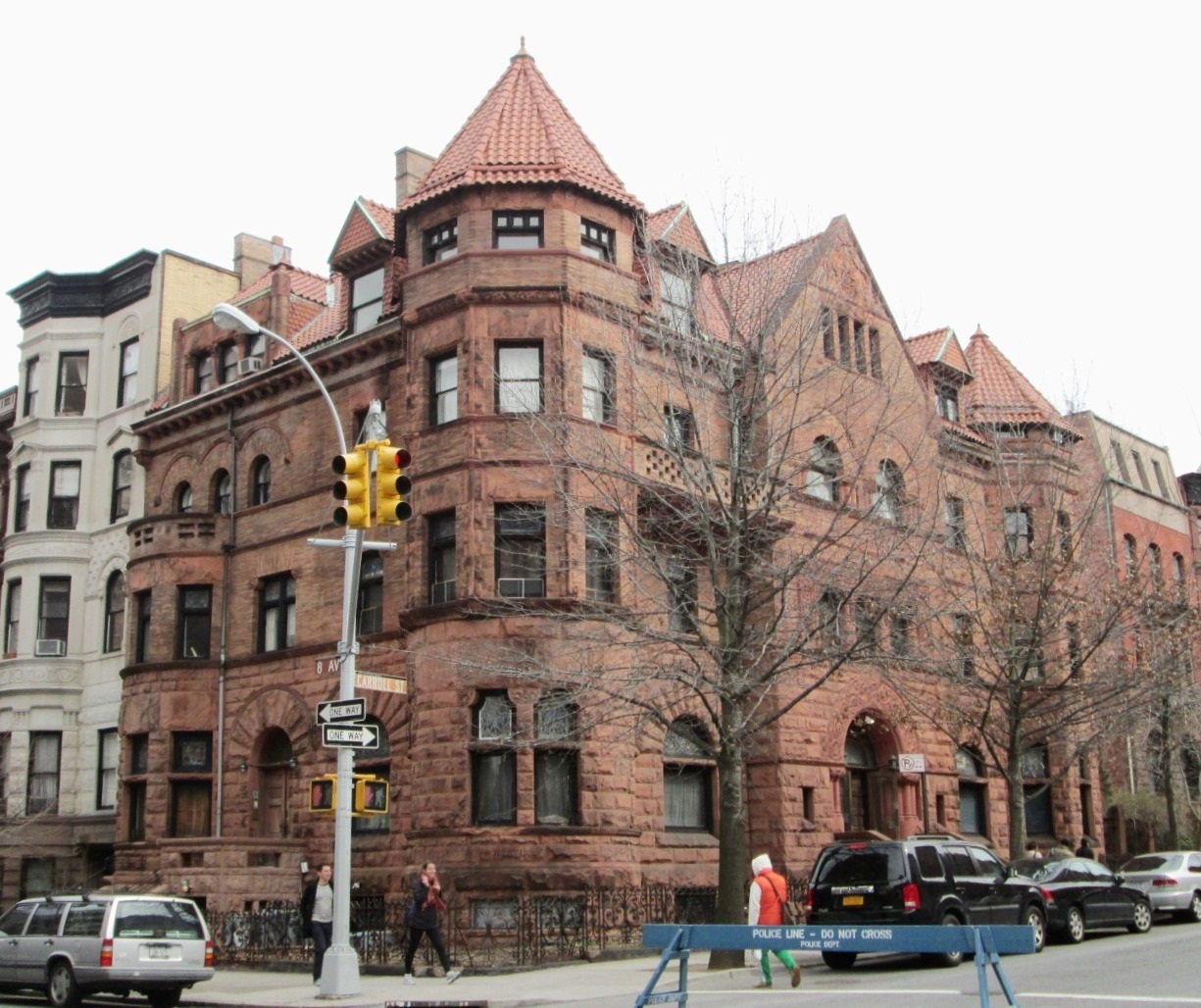
- (2013)

- 40°40′20″N 73°58′24″W
- Location: 115–119 Eighth Avenue; Brooklyn, New York City

History
- Built: 1888

Site notes
- Architect: C. P. H. Gilbert
- Architectural style: Richardsonian Romanesque
- Governing body: private

New York City Landmark
- Designated: July 17, 1983
- Part of: Park Slope Historic District

115–119 Eighth Avenue, also known as the Adams House, is a historic house at Eighth Avenue and Carroll Street in Park Slope, Brooklyn, New York City. It was built in 1888 as a double house, and was commissioned by Thomas Adams Jr., who invented the Adams Chiclets automatic vending machine. It was designed by noted architect C. P. H. Gilbert in the Richardsonian Romanesque style, and is considered to be one of the best examples of that style extant in New York City, "worthy of H. H. Richardson." The house is built of sandstone, terra cotta and brick on a brownstone base, and was the first house in the neighborhood with an elevator. It has now been converted into apartments.

The building is located within the Park Slope Historic District, which was designated by the New York City Landmarks Preservation Commission in 1973.

== History ==
C. P. H. Gilbert, who had been trained as an employee of H. H. Richardson, was the architect for the majority of the houses on Montgomery Place in Brooklyn, as well as many of the mansions on Fifth Avenue in Manhattan.

At the turn of the 20th century, Thomas Adams' family moved to Riverside Drive in Manhattan, and their former house in Park Slope was occupied for many years by Alvin Edger Ivie, a relative by marriage of F. W. Woolworth. Ivie worked for the F. W. Woolworth Company and was also a director of the East Brooklyn Savings Bank.

A long-surviving local tale says that the building is haunted: it had one of the first elevators in a private home, and when Adams went away, some of the servants are said to have gotten stuck in the elevator when it stalled, and could not get out. By the time Adams had returned, says the rumor, the servants were dead.

== Description ==
In the Adams Residence, Gilbert designed a corner tower, projecting gable roofs and dormers. The building's warm and rich tones contrast with the other outstanding Richardsonian residence in the area, the Hulbert Mansion on Prospect Park West, designed by Montrose Morris. The Adams Residence's salmon-colored brick, sandstone and terra cotta contrasts with the cooler-hued limestone of the Hulbert Mansion. In the Adams house itself, the rusticated brownstone base contrasts with the texture of the smooth Roman brick above.

The Eighth Avenue facade of the double house, which is dominated by the corner tower balanced by triple windows set in a hipped dormer, has a two-story curved bay topped by a brick parapet and an arched entrance balanced by an arched window. This entrance was used by Thomas Adams' son John Dunbar Adams, who occupied this side of the double house.

On the Carroll Street side of the residence is the main entrance to the house, reached by way of a low stoop. The carved Syrian entrance arch is supported by clustered capped dwarf columns. Above the arch is a triple window, surrounded by the same naturalistic bas relief pattern of leaves which adorn the columns. The windows rest on columns topped by basketwork capitals. Also resting on dwarf columns are the arches which define the windows on the third floor. Under the gable, whose peak is adorned by more foliate carving, are four narrow windows which provide light for the attic floor. The first floor windows all have stone transom bars, with the transoms all made of exceptional stained glass.

From the Carroll Street side it can be seen that the corner tower is round on the first floor, but polygonal above that. It is topped by a high octagonal roof covered in tile. An open-work brick balcony is attached to the east side of the tower.

== See also ==
- List of New York City Designated Landmarks in Brooklyn
