= Harry Hoffman (politician) =

Brooklyn politician 1894–1976

Harry Hoffman (1894–1976) was an American political figure within the Brooklyn Democratic machine (Kings County Democratic County Committee) during the early 20th century.

Hoffman was a prominent restauranteur and political boss in Brownsville and East New York's 2nd Assembly District. As the proprietor and "standard bearer" of the Harry Hoffman Democratic Club, he was regarded by the local press as "one of the most popular Democrats in the borough."

== The Harry Hoffman Democratic Club ==
In early 1927, Hoffman founded his namesake organization to secure "proper recognition" for the lower section of East New York in Brooklyn. Located at the intersection of Snediker and Livonia avenues, the club's headquarters was described as the "most modern and up to date clubhouse" in the section. The multistory clubhouse featured a library, a large auditorium, and rooms for playing cards and billiards. Over one thousand guests attended the launch.

The club's activities were frequently attended by the highest levels of the New York Democratic establishment.

John H. McCooey, the leader of the Kings County Democratic machine, considered the most powerful figure in Brooklyn politics, was involved in the club's affairs, personally attending the organization's grand opening and its first annual ball at the Hotel St. George in Brooklyn Heights.

Other prominent officials involved with the club and frequenting events included:

- Governor Alfred E. Smith, affiliated with Manhattan's Tammany Hall political machine, served as an honorary member.
- Emanuel Celler, United States Congressman.
- James J. Byrne, Brooklyn Borough President.
- John Dorman, New York City Fire Commissioner.

=== Political Influence and Strategy ===
Hoffman's club was central in the Democrat's ideological battle against the Socialist Party in the 2nd Assembly District. Hoffman actively worked to "disintegrate" local Socialist strength, reporting that numerous Socialists were enrolling as Democrats due to the club's growth.

During the 1927 elections, "Hoffman workers", known as Hoffmanites, were credited with facilitating a massive shift toward the Democratic machine, helping candidates like Alderman Thomas J. Cox defeat Socialist opponents by margins as high as ten to one.

=== Community Role ===
Under Hoffman's leadership, the organization functioned as a social club, and welfare organization for the neighborhoods of Brownsville and East New York, which was home to large immigrant communities.

The club hosted benefit parties to raise funds for food and necessities for impoverished families in the community. Its social calendar included high-profile entertainment and dances held at major Brooklyn venues like Trommer's in Bushwick, and the Hotel St. George in Brooklyn Heights.
