= Imperial Apartments =

Residential building in Brooklyn, New York

Coordinates: 40.6776°N 73.9524°W

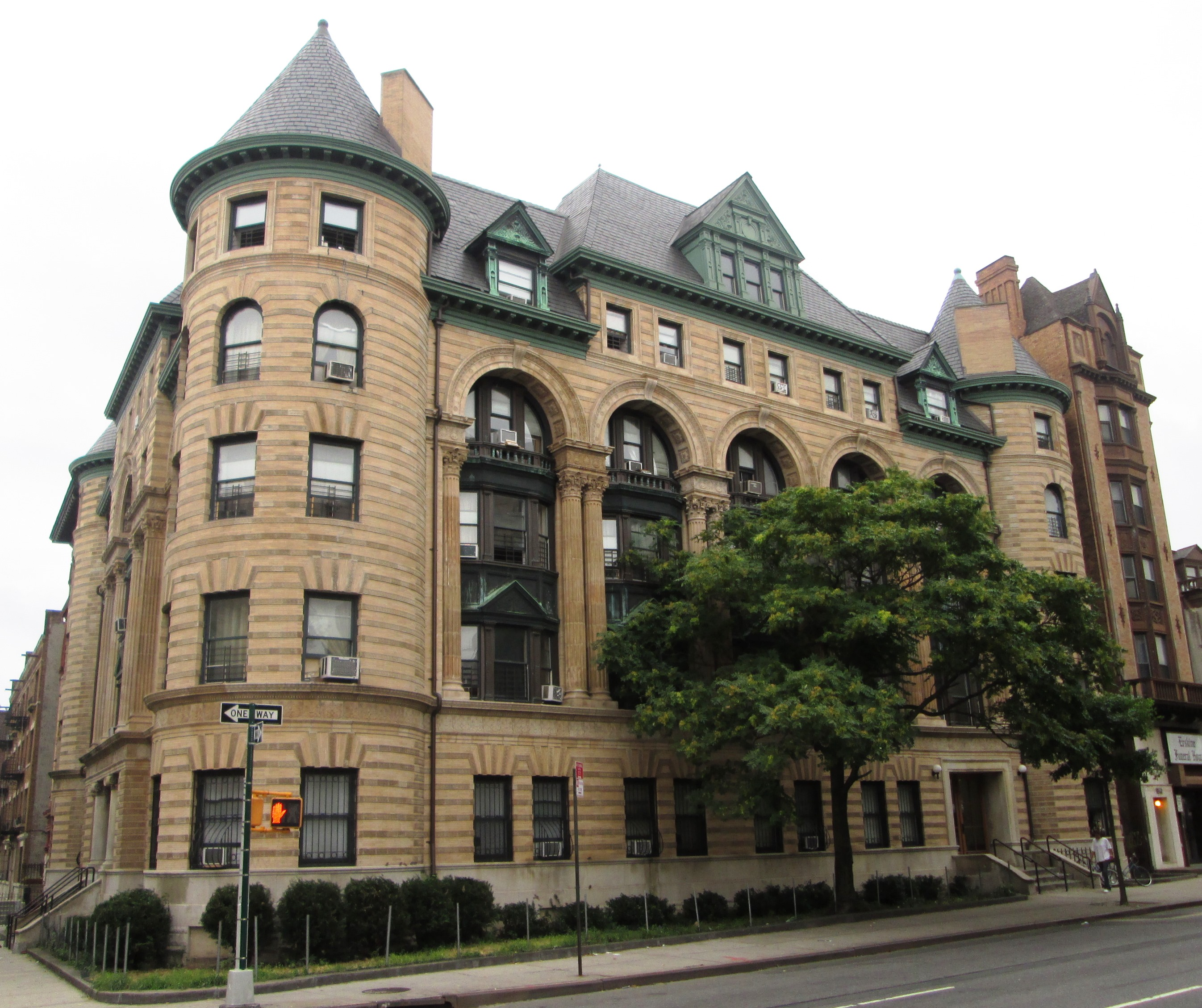
Imperial Apartments in Crown Heights from north

The Imperial Apartments is a Renaissance style residential building at 1198 Pacific Street in the Crown Heights neighborhood of Brooklyn in New York City. They were designed by architect Montrose Morris for the developer Louis F. Seitz in 1892. At the time of construction, single-family row houses were typical for the middle-class families. Changing attitudes in the late 19th century made it socially acceptable for families to live in the apartment house. Morris designed the Imperial to speak to these changing attitudes and introduced a high-quality of design and materials such as yellow and buff brick and terra cotta to the building seamlessly blending it in with the surrounding neighborhood of Grant Square.

In the 1970s, New York City took possession of the building due to unpaid taxes. In 1986, it was designated as a landmark by the New York City Landmarks Preservation Commission. A $6.3 million gut renovation occurred in the 1990s. It is also a contributing property to the Crown Heights North Historic District.

== See also ==
- List of New York City Designated Landmarks in Brooklyn
