= Crown Heights North Historic District =

Historic district in Brooklyn, New York

- U.S. National Register of Historic Places
- U.S. Historic district
- New York City Landmark
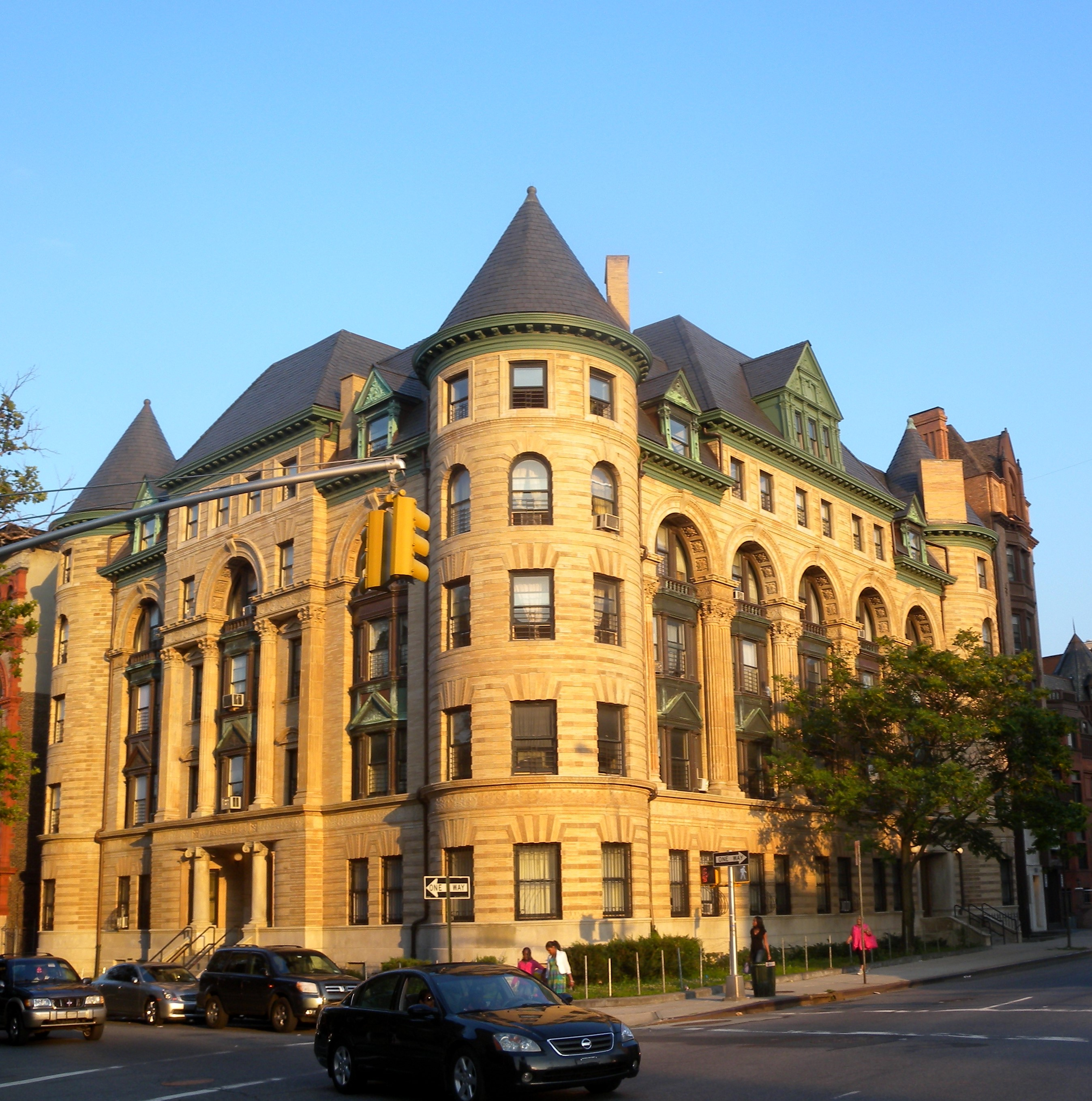
- Imperial Apartments in June 2010

- Location within New York City
- Location: Albany, Brooklyn & St. Mark's Aves., Dean & Pacific Sts., Hampton, Lincoln, Park, Prospect, Revere & St. John's Pls.,, Brooklyn, New York
- Coordinates: 40°40′36″N 73°56′43″W
- Area: 102.86 acres (41.63 ha)
- Built: c. 1853-1942
- Architectural style: Greek Revival, Gothic Revival, Italianate, Second Empire, Queen Anne, Romanesque Revival, Renaissance Revival, Beaux-Arts, Colonial Revival
- NRHP reference No.: 14000092 (original); 16000111 (increase)
- NYCL No.: 2204, 2361, 2489

Significant dates
- Added to NRHP: March 31, 2014
- Boundary increase: March 11, 2016
- Designated NYCL: April 24, 2007 (Crown Heights North I); June 28, 2011 (Crown Heights North II); March 24, 2015 (Crown Heights North III)

Crown Heights North Historic District is a national historic district located in the Crown Heights neighborhood of Brooklyn, Kings County, New York. The district encompasses 1,019 contributing buildings in a predominantly residential section of Brooklyn. The district features noteworthy examples of Greek Revival, Gothic Revival, Italianate, Second Empire, Queen Anne, Romanesque Revival, Renaissance Revival, Beaux-Arts, and Colonial Revival style architecture. It largely developed between about 1853 and 1942, and consists of densely constructed rowhouses, townhouses, two-family houses, semi-attached houses, freestanding houses, flats, apartment buildings, and institutional and commercial buildings.

Notable buildings include the former Union League Club Building (c. 1889), Union United Methodist Church (1889–1891), Brooklyn Methodist Episcopal Church Home (1889, 1913), Bedford Central Presbyterian Church (1897, 1906), Hebron French Speaking Seventh Day Adventist Church (1909), St. Gregory the Great Roman Catholic Church (1915–1916), and the former Kings County Savings Bank (1929–1930).

It was listed on the National Register of Historic Places in 2014. Two years later, its boundaries were expanded to take in 600 more buildings, including some associated with Shirley Chisholm, the first African-American woman elected to Congress.

== See also ==
- National Register of Historic Places listings in Kings County, New York
