= Clark Street station =

New York City Subway station in Brooklyn

Clark Street
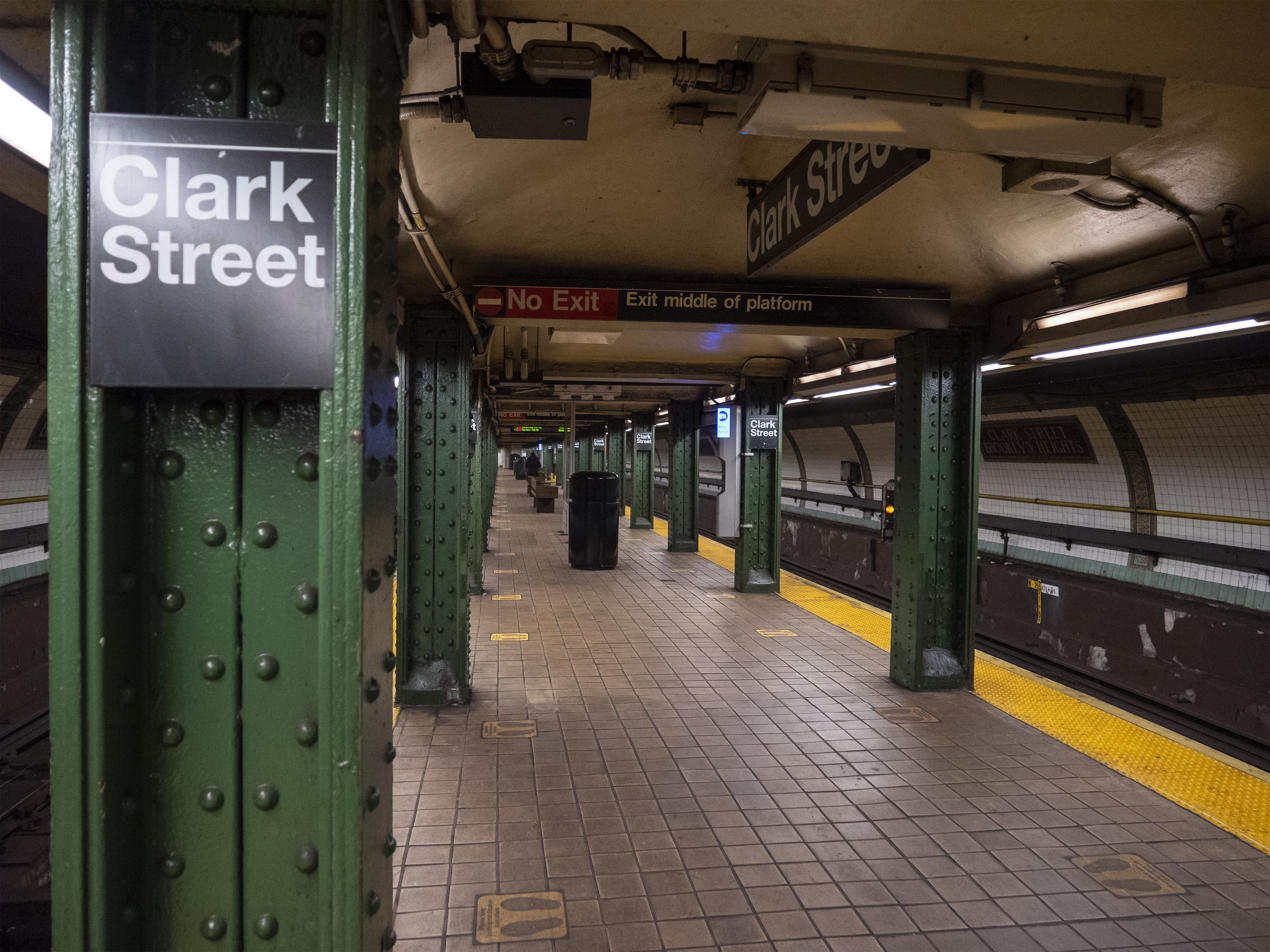

Station statistics
- Address: Clark Street & Henry Street; Brooklyn, New York
- Borough: Brooklyn
- Locale: Brooklyn Heights
- Coordinates: 40°41′51″N 73°59′35″W
- Division: A (IRT)
- Line: IRT Broadway–Seventh Avenue Line
- Services: 2 (all times); 3 (all except late nights)
- Transit: NYC Ferry: East River, South Brooklyn (at BBP Pier 1)
- Structure: Underground
- Platforms: 1 island platform
- Tracks: 2

Other information
- Opened: April 15, 1919; 107 years ago
- Accessible: Partially; access to mezzanine only, platforms not accessible
- Former/other names: Clark Street–Brooklyn Heights

Traffic
- 2025: 1,717,516 ▼4.1%
- Rank: 206 out of 423
Services
Preceding station	New York City Subway	Following station
Wall Street 2 3 via 135th Street	2 (New York City Subway service) 3 (New York City Subway service)	Borough Hall 2 3 via Franklin Avenue–Medgar Evers College
Location
Location within New York City Subway
Location within New York City
Location within New York
Track layout
Street map
Station service legend
Symbol	Description
Stops all times except late nights	Stops all times except late nights
Stops all times	Stops all times
Stops weekdays during the day	Stops weekdays during the day
Stops weekdays and weekday late nights	Stops weekdays and weekday late nights

The Clark Street station (originally the Brooklyn Heights station) is a station on the IRT Broadway–Seventh Avenue Line of the New York City Subway. It is located at Clark Street and Henry Street in Brooklyn Heights, Brooklyn. It is served by the 2 train at all times and the 3 train at all times except late nights. At approximately 80 feet (24 m) deep, the Clark Street station contains one island platform and two tracks. Its only exit is via a set of three elevators, which lead from a passageway above the platform to the ground story of the Hotel St. George. Despite being one of three New York City Subway stations that can only be accessed by elevators, the Clark Street station is not wheelchair-accessible, with only stairs leading to the platforms.

The Clark Street station was built for the Interborough Rapid Transit Company (IRT) as part of the Clark Street Tunnel, which in turn was built as part of the Dual Contracts. It opened on April 15, 1919, and initially had two elevators; a third elevator was installed in 1931. Two of the elevators were replaced in 1962, and the station received a major renovation in the 1980s. Due to repeated breakdowns of the elevators, further replacements took place in 2000 and between 2021 and 2022, requiring the full closure of the Clark Street station.

== History ==
=== Construction and opening ===
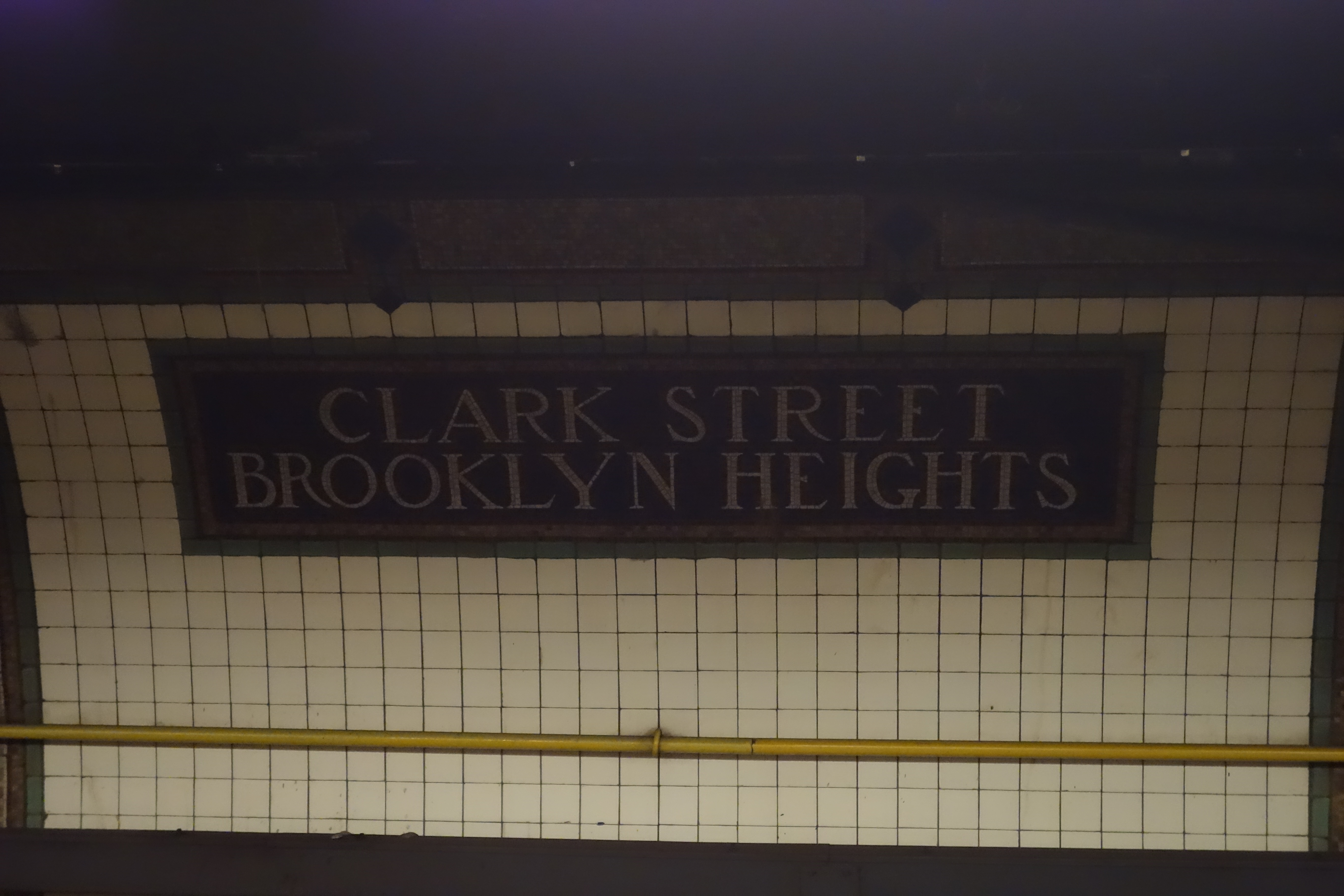
Original mosaics displaying the station name

The Interborough Rapid Transit Company (IRT) opened its first subway line in 1904; the line was extended from Manhattan to Downtown Brooklyn in 1908 with the opening of the Joralemon Street Tunnel. Residents of Brooklyn Heights, a largely residential neighborhood near Downtown Brooklyn, expressed concerns in 1909 that there was no subway station within Brooklyn Heights, even though the line had an emergency exit at Joralemon and Hicks Streets in the center of the neighborhood. After the first line opened, the city began planning new lines. In April 1912, the New York Public Service Commission gave the Brooklyn Rapid Transit Company (BRT) the right to operate the proposed Clark Street Tunnel under the East River, between Old Slip in Lower Manhattan and Clark Street in Downtown Brooklyn, with a stop along Clark Street. The next month, the Old Slip–Clark Street route was assigned to the IRT instead; the plans called for a station at Clark Street. As part of the Dual Contracts between the government of New York City, the BRT, and the IRT, which were signed in 1913, the Clark Street Tunnel was assigned to the IRT, becoming the Brooklyn branch of the Broadway–Seventh Avenue Line, which diverged from the original subway south of Times Square.

The Clark Street Tunnel consisted of a pair of 5,900-foot-long (1,800 m) tubes, with a station at the eastern end of the tubes. This station, the line's first stop in Brooklyn, was to be at Clark and Henry Streets. By November 1913, the Public Service Commission had decided that the Brooklyn Heights station would be a deep-level station that would be solely or primarily accessed by elevators. Booth & Flinn Ltd. and the O'Rourke Engineering Construction Company received a $6.47 million contract in July 1914 to build a tunnel between Old Slip in Manhattan and Clark Street in Brooklyn. Construction of the tunnel began on October 12, 1914, and both tubes were holed through in December 1916. The station was named the Brooklyn Heights station in 1917. By January 1919, the tracks had been completed, but signals and station finishes were still being installed. Because the station was 80 feet (24 m) deep, it could only be accessed by elevators from the lobby of the Hotel St. George. The tube was largely finished by March, and the IRT decided to push forward the tunnel's opening after learning that BRT workers might go on strike.

On April 15, 1919, the Clark Street Tunnel opened, and this station opened with it, extending West Side Line express trains from Wall Street on the other side of the East River to Atlantic Avenue via a new connection at Borough Hall. The connection doubled the number of IRT trains that could travel between Manhattan and Brooklyn, and it eased congestion in the Joralemon Street Tunnel, the only other tunnel carrying IRT trains between the two boroughs. Direct express service to Times Square was provided to the inhabitants of Brooklyn for the first time as a result (trains through the Joralemon Street Tunnel made express stops in Manhattan, skipping Times Square). Soon after the station opened, the Public Service Commission began planning to install an escalator there, as passengers had to climb 71 steps to exit the station; the escalator was not built.

=== Post-opening ===
==== 1920s to 1960s ====
After Brooklyn Heights residents complained that sailors were using the Clark Street station at night to travel to the Brooklyn Navy Yard, Rear Admiral Charles Peshall Plunkett of the United States Navy stationed guards outside the station in 1924 to prevent sailors from using it from 6 p.m. to 6 a.m. to reduce overcrowding. The station's existing elevators had reached capacity by 1930. This prompted the New York State Transit Commission to mandate on April 30, 1930, that the IRT install a third elevator at the station, using an existing elevator shaft. The commission approved a $41,300 contract for the installation of an elevator in December 1930. This elevator went into service on November 25, 1931. Additionally, the IRT had installed silencing devices on the station's turnstiles by early 1931. The city government took over the IRT's operations on June 12, 1940.

As part of a modernization program for the New York City Subway system, the New York City Board of Transportation provided funding for the lengthening of the Clark Street station's platform during the 1950 fiscal year. The New York City Transit Authority (NYCTA) announced plans in 1956 to add fluorescent lights above the edges of the station's platforms, which were installed the next year.

The station's first automatic elevator was installed in April 1962; it ran automatically during middays and evenings and was staffed by an operator at other times. Afterward, the NYCTA converted a second manual elevator to automatic operation. This prompted concerns from riders who said the automatic elevators might attract muggers. During the 1964–1965 fiscal year, the platforms at Clark Street, along with those at four other stations on the Broadway–Seventh Avenue Line, were lengthened to 525 feet (160 m) to accommodate a ten-car train of 51-foot (16 m) IRT cars. The work at Clark Street was performed by the Arthur A. Johnson Corporation.

==== 1970s to 1990s ====
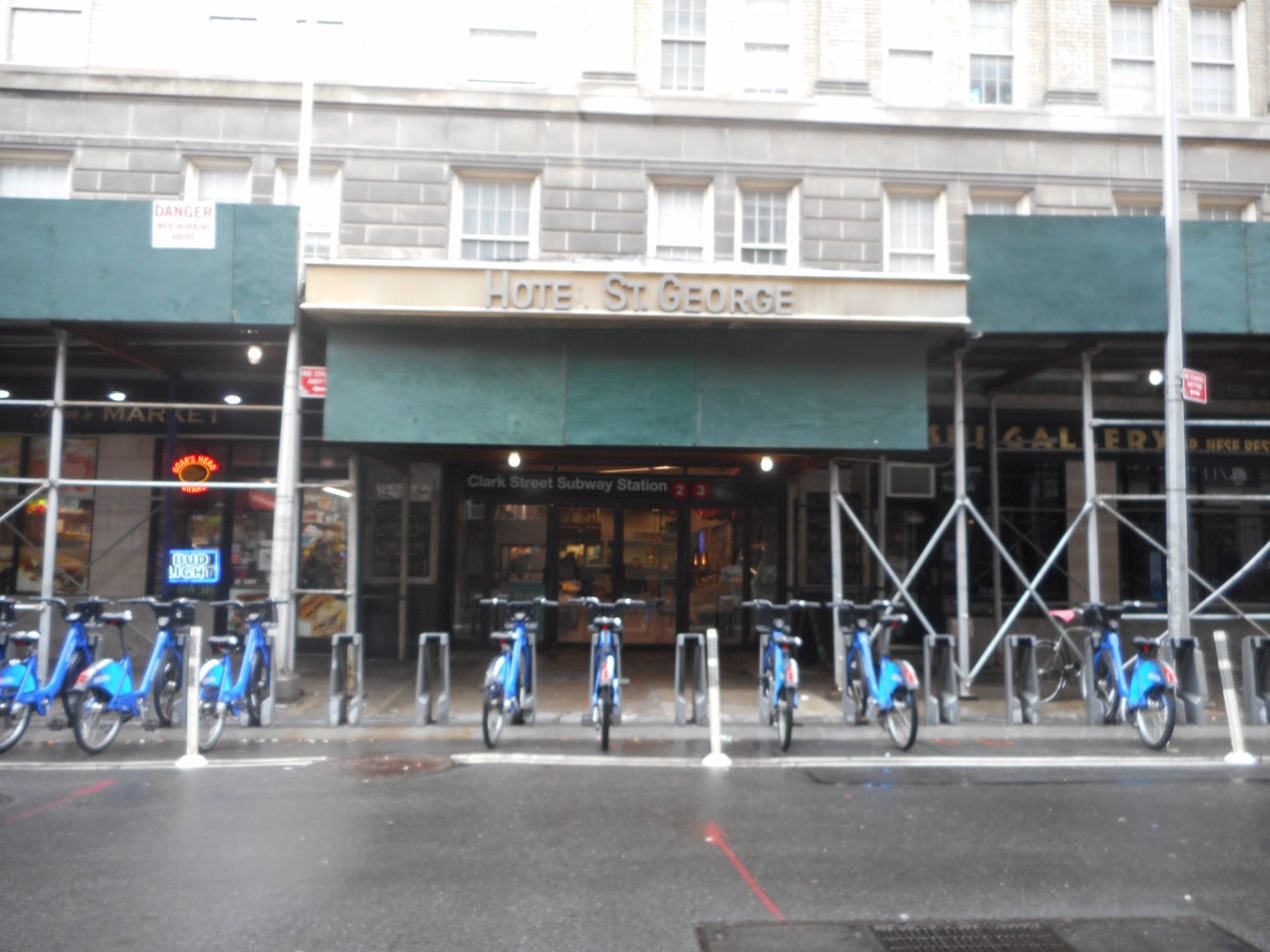
Entrance through the Hotel St. George

Local residents began raising concerns about the unreliability of the station's elevators in the early 1970s. The subway system's operator, the Metropolitan Transportation Authority (MTA), allocated funding for the replacement of the station's only remaining manual elevator in 1975 as part of the MTA's six-year capital plan. Developer Martin J. Raynes began converting part of the Hotel St. George, above the station, to an apartment building in 1978. As part of the project, mayor Ed Koch announced that the developer had agreed to renovate the hotel's subway entrance. On January 3, 1980, work began on a $225,000 project to renovate the arcade entrance to the station through the St. George Hotel. As part of the project, storefront repairs would be made, and new flooring and doors would be installed.

The station was selected for a renovation in 1979, and design work was completed in early 1982, after the Municipal Arts Society had taken over management of the design work in 1980. The MTA had listed the station among the 69 most deteriorated stations in the subway system in 1981. A renovation of the station, conducted as part of the MTA's Adopt-A-Station Program, was unveiled on February 9, 1983. The $260,000 cost was roughly evenly split between public and private agencies, with $120,000 coming from St. George Tower Developers. Neighborhood maps were added to the station as part of the project. Further renovations of the Clark Street station were funded as part of the MTA's 1980–1984 capital plan. The MTA received a $106 million grant from the Urban Mass Transit Administration in October 1983; most of the grant would fund the renovation of eleven stations, including Clark Street.

A further renovation during the mid-1980s involved refinishing the platform, installing new lights and new signs, repainting the station, and adding artwork. The project was budgeted at $1.25 million and was to begin in January 1984, but it quickly experienced delays and budget overruns, in part due to issues with the contractor. The MTA fired the original construction contractor, Standard Construction Services, in October 1985. At the time, the project was only 25 percent complete; tiles on the floors and walls had been removed, and part of the passageway connecting the platform to the elevators had been closed off, causing severe congestion during rush hours. The MTA hired a new contractor. The passageway was partitioned off for over two years while new tiles were installed on the walls; work was complicated by the fact that some of the tiles had been stolen. The renovation was also delayed because of poor communication: in one case, contractors installed a public-address system on a beam that was intended to contain new lighting. The project was completed in May 1987, and an artwork by Ray Ring was dedicated at the station in April 1988.

The Clark Street station's elevators had deteriorated by the 1990s, and residents described the station as dirty, unmaintained, and technologically obsolete. In 1990, Newsday reported that the emergency bell for the elevators were installed outside the token booth, meaning that token booth clerks could not hear when there was an issue. The same year, snowfall on a third rail caused an electrical fire in a tunnel near the Clark Street station, killing two people and injuring 149 others; it was the subway's worst-ever fire at the time. The severity of the fire was exacerbated by the fact that ventilation fans near the station were not working. The MTA had ordered four replacement fans in 1977 but did not install them until after the fire. The new fans had to be modified, as they required too much electricity and could not turn on. Another electrical fire occurred in an elevator room in 1992, although no one was injured in that incident. Newsday, in 1992, reported that one of the station's elevators had recorded 24 outages in six months and was non-functional for nearly a quarter of that time.

==== 2000s to present ====
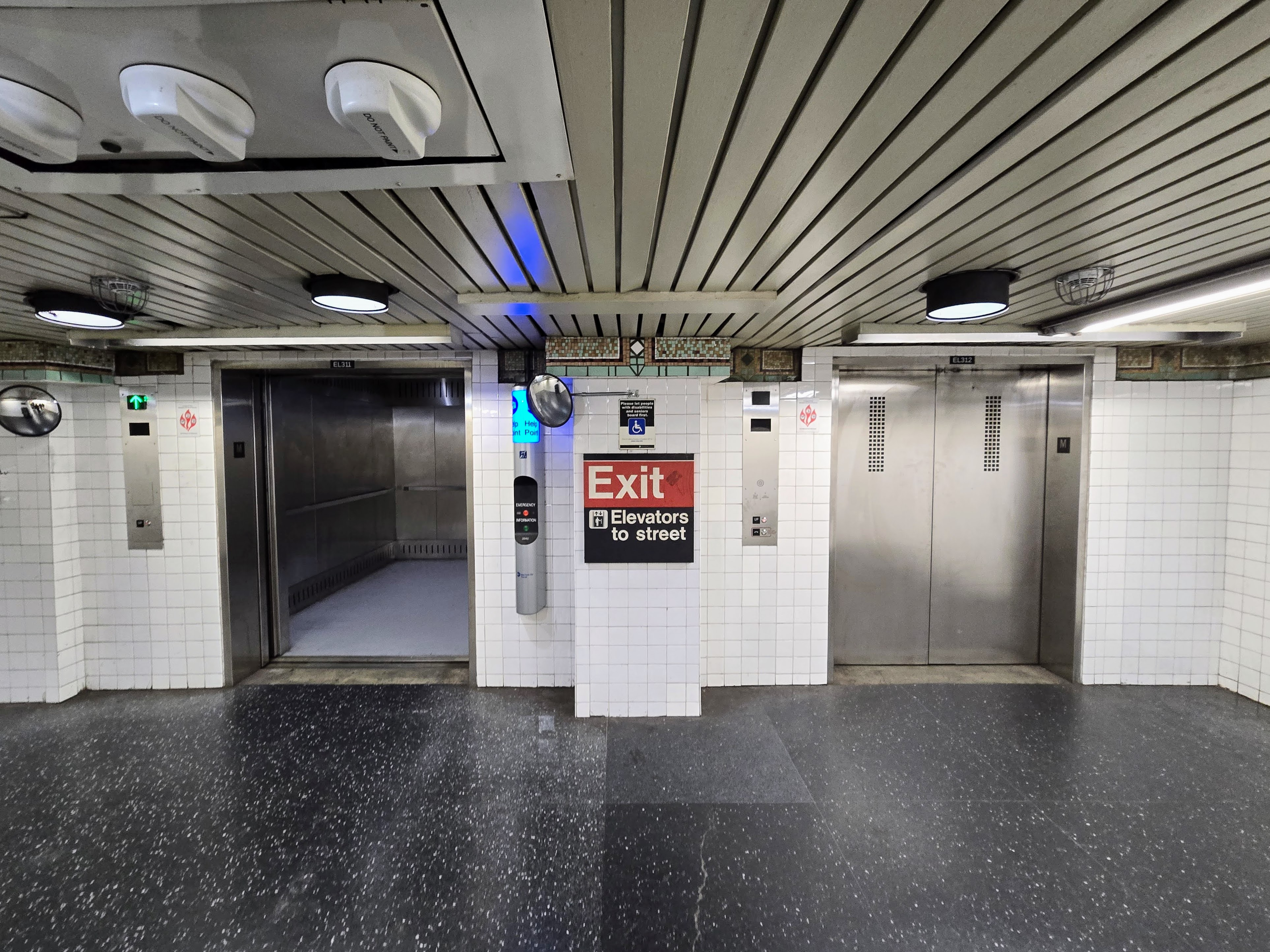
Two of the elevators to street level, after the 2021 elevator replacements

By early 2000, one of the station's elevators was so unreliable that it only operated during the morning peak. The other two elevators were supposed to run 24 hours a day, but one of the elevators was only operational 82 percent of the time, while the other was operational 94 percent of the time. That January, the MTA announced that it would close the Clark Street station for four months to repair the elevators, which dated from 1962. The project was estimated to cost $2 million. Although many merchants and residents opposed a full shutdown, the MTA estimated that it would be quicker than staggered repairs that could take up to two years. The station closed temporarily in April 2000; although the storefronts near the fare-control area remained open, their operators reported steep declines in business. To encourage on-time completion, the MTA charged the contractor $15,000 for every day the project was delayed. The project cost $3.5 million and was completed in August 2000, but riders reported that the elevators still sometimes broke down.

The elevators were repaired again in 2007. Transit Wireless installed Wi-Fi and cellular equipment at the Clark Street station in January 2017, making it the last underground station in the New York City Subway system to receive Wi-Fi and cell service. From June 2017 to June 2018 there was no weekend service at the Clark Street and Hoyt Street stations to repair damage to the Clark Street Tunnel from Hurricane Sandy and fortify it for future storms.

After several passengers were trapped in an elevator in late 2018, residents and officials, including Brooklyn borough president Eric Adams, asked the MTA to replace the station's elevators again. The MTA announced in 2019 that the elevators would need to be replaced again the next year. At the time, one of the station's three elevators was the fourth-least-reliable subway elevator in Brooklyn, out of 54 total. After deciding between multiple partial- and full-closure options, the MTA announced plans in September 2021 to close the station temporarily. The station was closed in November 2021, and reopened in May 2022. In spite of the renovation, local news website The City found that the elevators broke down dozens of times from May to December 2022, trapping passengers on several occasions.

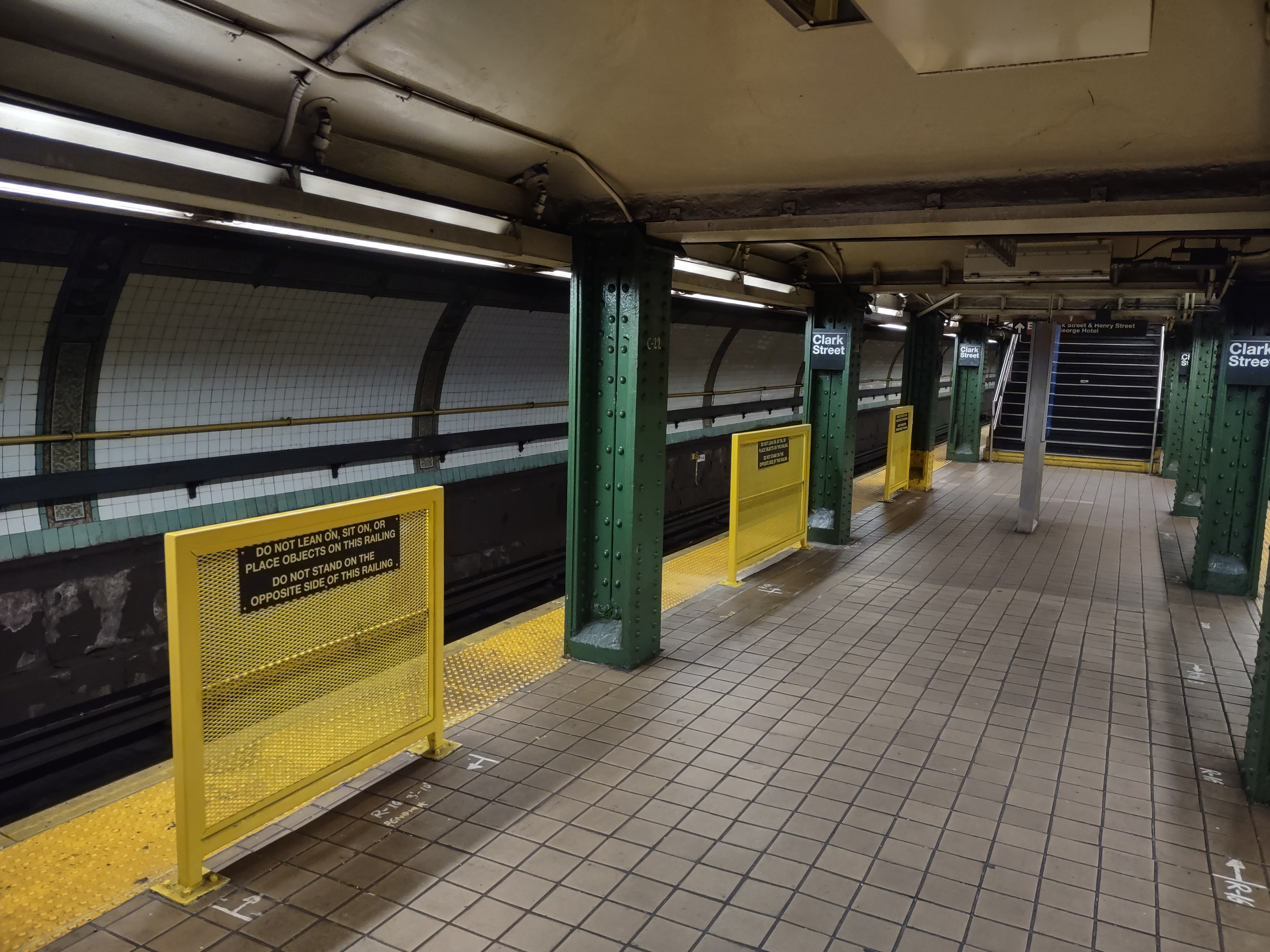
Platform barriers

In January 2024, the MTA installed low platform fences at the Clark Street station to reduce the likelihood of passengers falling onto the tracks. The yellow barriers, spaced along the length of the platform, do not have sliding platform screen doors between them.

The marquee above the station's Henry Street entrance collapsed in August 2025. No one was injured during the collapse, but it necessitated temporary closure of the station. Though the station reopened shortly afterward, engineers found similar issues with the awning on the Clark Street side of the hotel.

== Station layout ==
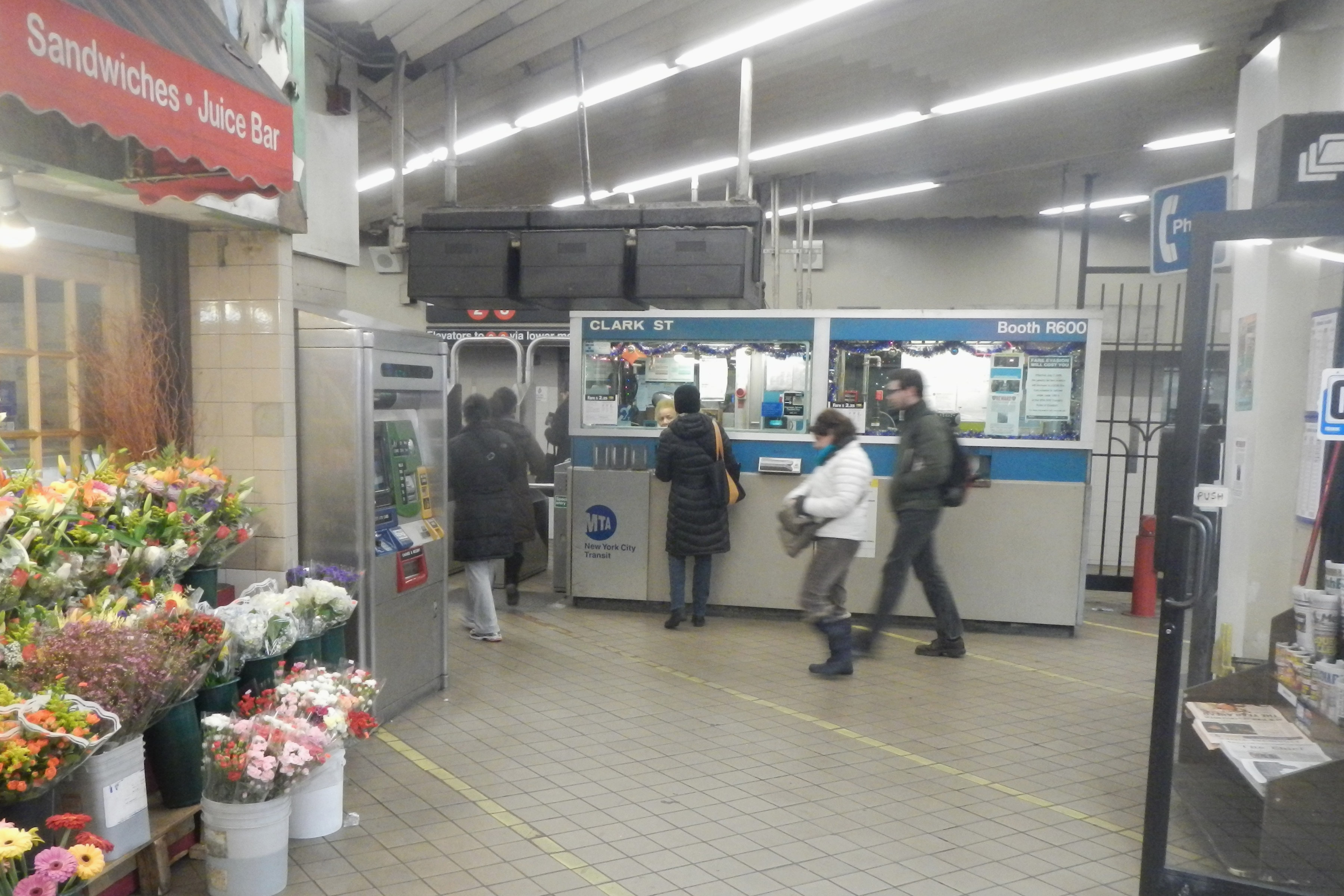
Fare control

Clark Street is geographically the westernmost station in Brooklyn on the Broadway–Seventh Avenue Line. It has one island platform and two tracks. The 2 stops here at all times, while the 3 train stops at all times except late nights. The station is between Wall Street in Manhattan to the north and Borough Hall to the south.

Fixed platform barriers, which are intended to prevent commuters falling to the tracks, are positioned near the platform edges. On the walls adjacent to the tracks are mosaics of sailing ships and docks, a reference to the maritime activity of New York Harbor. The walls also contain large name panels reading Clark Street–Brooklyn Heights. Due to the deep-bore tunneling used to construct this part of the line, the station's walls are rounded.

The center of the platform has two staircases, which ascend to a passageway on a lower mezzanine level immediately above the platform. This passageway is about 69 feet (21 m) below street level. The floor of the passageway contains a 1987 artwork titled Clark Street Passage by Ray Ring. The artwork consists of red circles, yellow triangles, and gray-white squares in various configurations, placed on a background of black tiles. According to MTA Arts & Design, the differing placements of the shapes were intended to "create a flowing sense of movement" for passengers who looked at the shapes while walking along the corridor.

=== Exit ===
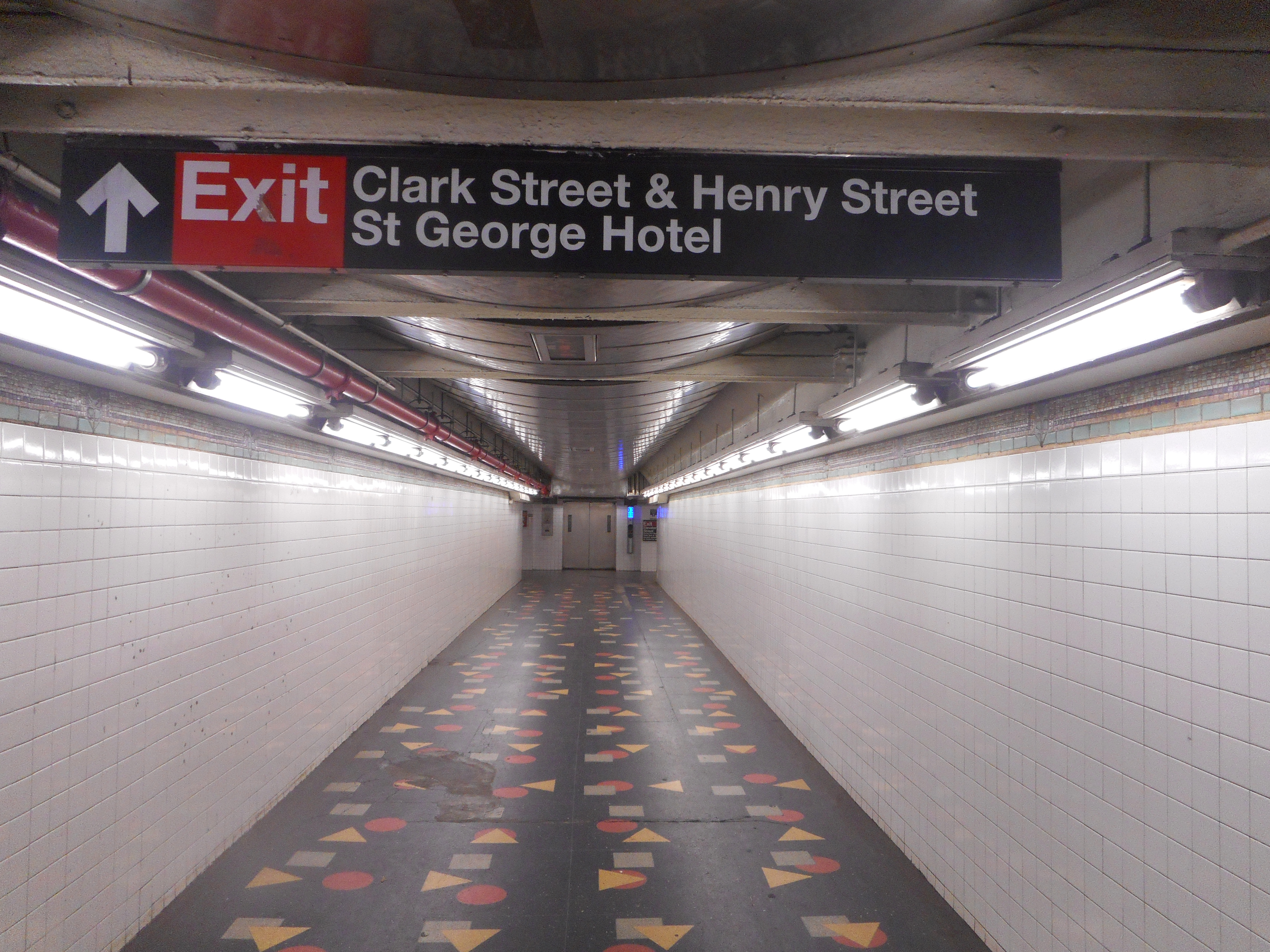
Passageway leading to elevators

The Clark Street station is one of only three stations in the subway system that can be accessed solely by elevators; the other two—168th Street and 181st Street—are also on the Broadway–Seventh Avenue Line, albeit in Upper Manhattan. Three elevators ascend from the lower-mezzanine passageway to a fare control area on the ground floor of the Hotel St. George. Each elevator fits approximately 48 people. The fare control area contains a small arcade with businesses and two doorways to the street. A rarely-used emergency stairwell, between elevators 1 and 2, ascends 80 feet (24 m) from the passageway to fare control. This stairway is about 3 feet (0.91 m) wide. Next to the fare control area is a series of retail spaces. Nearby points of interest include Cadman Plaza Park two blocks east, the New York State Supreme Court, Appellate Division, Second Department two blocks south, and the Brooklyn Heights Promenade three blocks west.

The station is not fully ADA-accessible, since no elevators or ramps lead from the passageway to the platform. A study by Stantec found that it was infeasible to make the station ADA-accessible by extending the lower mezzanine passageway, replacing one of the staircases between the passageway and the platform, and adding another staircase elsewhere. The passageway could not be extended because the tracks would need to be closed, and excavations for the passageway could compromise the structural integrity of the cavern. Additionally, the side walls of the passageway could not be modified because it was a truss bridge.

The developers of Brooklyn Bridge Park, along the East River shoreline, proposed constructing an entrance from the park to the station in 2000. The plan was scrapped in 2007 after a study of traffic patterns found that it would cost between $30 million and $50 million to build a four-block passageway to the park. In 2008, Brooklyn Community Board 6 studied the possibility of creating an exit to the park. The exit would have consisted of a tunnel connection measuring 1,135 feet (346 m) from the east side of Furman Street to the center of the existing mezzanine passageway. Construction of this passageway would have required expensive major structural support for the Brooklyn Queens Expressway cantilever overhead. With an overall estimated cost of $226 million, excluding the cost of acquiring the right-of-way for the tunnel, it was deemed economically infeasible.
