= Wall Street station (IRT Broadway–Seventh Avenue Line) =

New York City Subway station in Manhattan

Wall Street
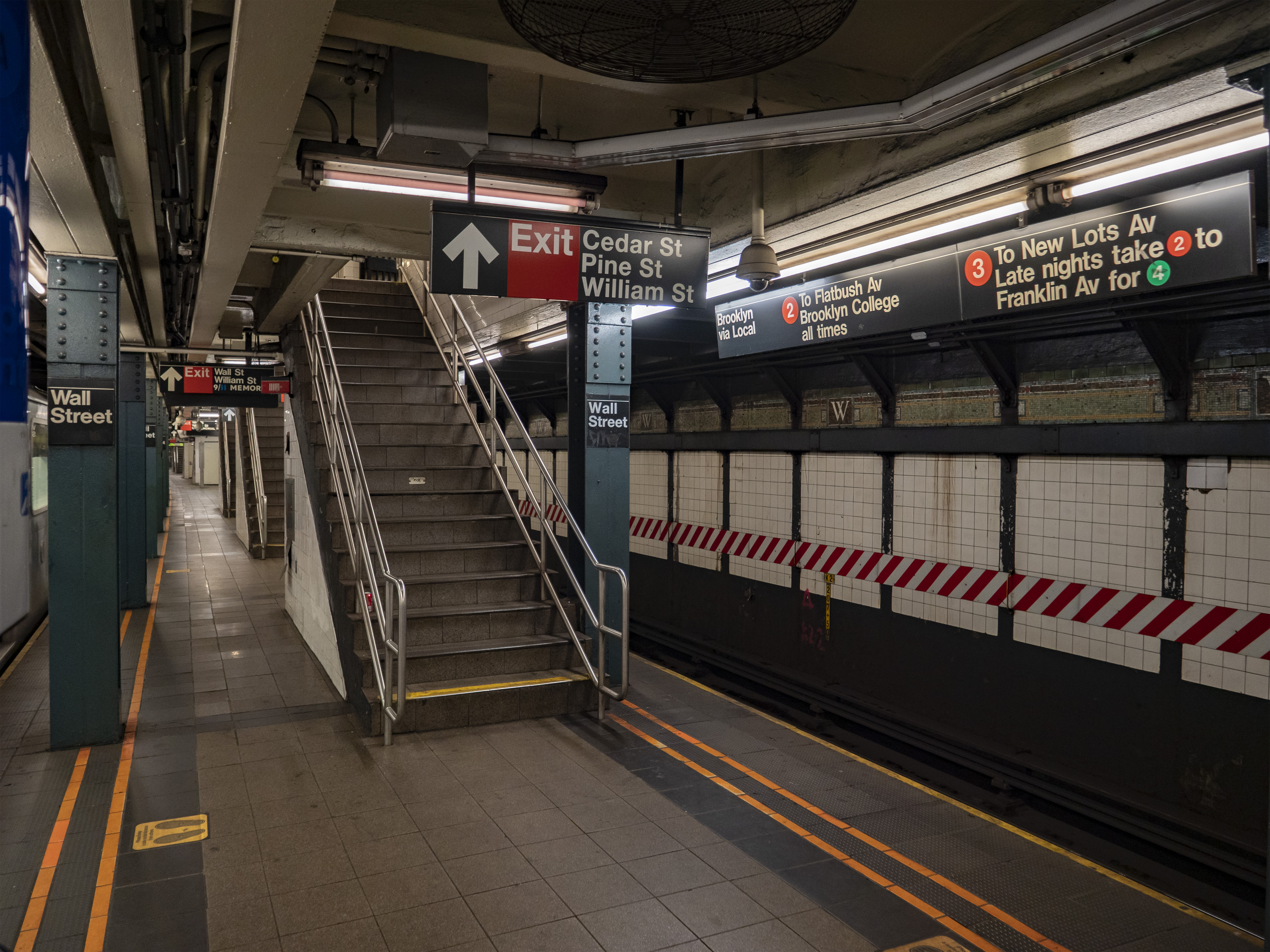
- Station platform looking south

Station statistics
- Address: Wall Street & William Street; New York, New York
- Borough: Manhattan
- Locale: Financial District
- Coordinates: 40.706311°N 74.009528°W
- Division: A (IRT)
- Line: IRT Broadway–Seventh Avenue Line
- Services: 2 (all times); 3 (all except late nights)
- Transit: NYCT Bus: M15, M15 SBS, SIM5, SIM15, SIM35; MTA Bus: BM1, BM2, BM3, BM4, QM7, QM8, QM11, QM25, QM65; Staten Island Ferry at Whitehall Terminal
- Structure: Underground
- Platforms: 1 island platform
- Tracks: 2

Other information
- Opened: July 1, 1918; 108 years ago

Traffic
- 2025: 4,440,754 ▲8.8%
- Rank: 71 out of 423
Services
Preceding station	New York City Subway	Following station
Fulton Street 2 3 via 135th Street	2 (New York City Subway service) 3 (New York City Subway service)	Clark Street 2 3 via Franklin Avenue–Medgar Evers College
Location
Location within New York City Subway
Location within New York City
Location within New York
Track layout
Street map
Station service legend
Symbol	Description
Stops all times except late nights	Stops all times except late nights
Stops all times	Stops all times
Stops weekdays during the day	Stops weekdays during the day
Stops weekdays and weekday late nights	Stops weekdays and weekday late nights

The Wall Street station (referred to on some strip maps as Wall Street–William Street) is a station on the IRT Broadway–Seventh Avenue Line of the New York City Subway, located at the intersection of Wall Street and William Street in the Financial District of Manhattan. It is served by the 2 train at all times and the 3 train at all times except late nights.

== History ==
=== Construction and opening ===
After the original IRT opened, the city began planning new lines. In April 1912, the New York Public Service Commission gave the Brooklyn Rapid Transit Company (BRT) the right to operate the proposed Clark Street Tunnel under the East River, between Old Slip in Lower Manhattan and Clark Street in Downtown Brooklyn. The next month, the Old Slip–Clark Street route was assigned to the IRT instead; the plans called for a station at Fulton Street. The BRT was allowed to extend its Centre Street Line south to a new Montague Street Tunnel. Both this extension and the IRT's Clark Street Tunnel were to have stations at Fulton Street in Lower Manhattan. These routes were finalized in the Dual Contracts between the government of New York City, the BRT, and the IRT, which were signed in 1913.

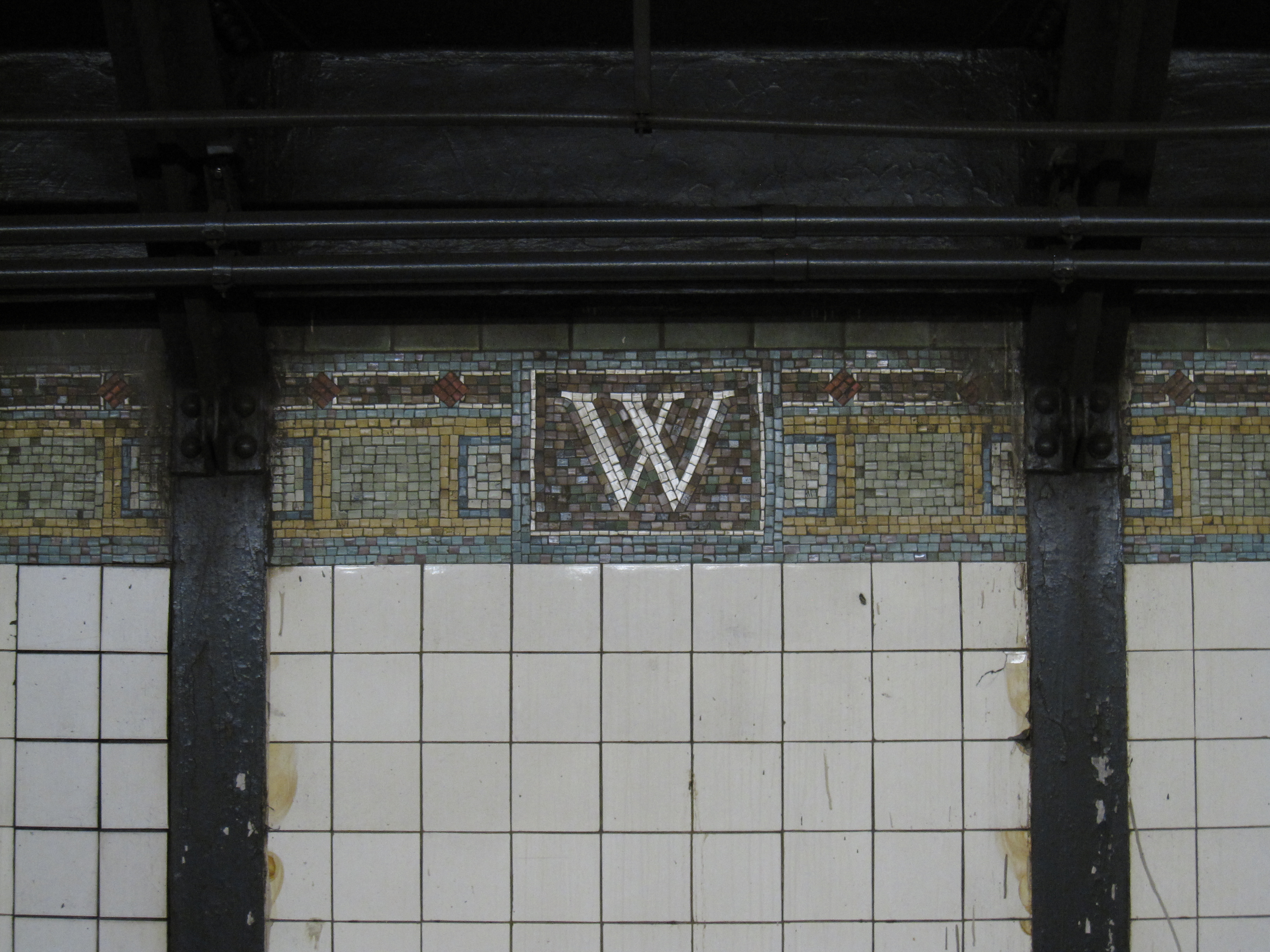
Mosaic on the wall

As part of the Dual Contracts, the New York City Public Service Commission planned to split the original IRT system into three segments: two north-south lines, carrying through trains over the Lexington Avenue and Broadway–Seventh Avenue Lines, and a west-east shuttle under 42nd Street. This would form a roughly H-shaped system. The Dual Contracts entailed building the IRT Broadway–Seventh Avenue Line south of Times Square–42nd Street. South of the Chambers Street station, the line was to split into two branches, one of which would travel under Park Place and William Street to the Clark Street Tunnel in Brooklyn. The Brooklyn branch was to have a station at William and Fulton Streets. Before the Dual Contracts were signed, many business owners on William Street had opposed the construction of a subway line there, claiming that the subway's construction could damage buildings because the street only measured 40 feet (12 m) wide. The New York Supreme Court, Appellate Division, approved the William Street subway in February 1913. The William Street subway was to be a two-track line; the Public Service Commission originally planned to place one track above the other but, by July 1914, had decided to build both tracks on one level. The tunnel was to measure 29 feet (8.8 m) wide, except the stations on Fulton Street and Wall Street, which were to measure 40 feet (12 m) wide.

The Public Service Commission began soliciting bids for the William Street portion of the line in September 1914. Smith, Hauser, & McIsaac submitted a low bid of $2.254 million. The awarding of the contract was delayed by a dispute over whether gas mains should be carried on temporary overpasses above the tunnel's excavation site. Prior to the start of construction, the city government agreed to pay for any damage caused by the project. The contractors underpinned every building along the tunnel because most of the buildings had shallow foundations that extended only to a shallow layer of quicksand, rather than to the bedrock below.

The line was nearly completed by late 1917, but the signals and station finishes were incomplete due to World War I–related material shortages. The Broadway–Seventh Avenue Line's Wall Street station opened on July 1, 1918, and was initially served by a shuttle to and from Chambers Street. On August 1, 1918, the new "H" system was implemented, joining the two halves of the Broadway–Seventh Avenue Line and sending all West Side trains south from Times Square; through trains on the Brooklyn branch began operating to Upper Manhattan and the Bronx. The Wall Street station was the line's terminus until April 15, 1919, when the Clark Street Tunnel opened, allowing service to run to Brooklyn. The connection eased congestion in the Joralemon Street Tunnel, which, prior to the Clark Street Tunnel's opening, was the only tunnel carrying IRT trains between Manhattan and Brooklyn.

=== Later years ===
The IRT had installed silencing devices on the station's turnstiles by early 1931. The city government took over the IRT's operations on June 12, 1940. During the 1964–1965 fiscal year, the platforms at Wall Street, along with those at four other stations on the Broadway–Seventh Avenue Line, were lengthened to 525 feet to accommodate a ten-car train of 51-foot IRT cars.

In the 1980s, as part of the construction of the nearby 60 Wall Street, an entrance to the Wall Street station was constructed in that building's lobby. In 1995, as a result of service reductions, the MTA was considering permanently closing one of the two Wall Street stations, as well as two other stations citywide, due to their proximity to each other. Either the IRT Broadway–Seventh Avenue Line station or the IRT Lexington Avenue Line station would have been closed.

== Station layout ==
The Wall Street station is under the intersection of Wall and William Streets.The 2 train serves the station at all times, while the 3 train stops here at all times except late nights. The station is the southernmost in Manhattan on the Brooklyn Branch of the Broadway–Seventh Avenue Line. South of here, the line travels under the East River via the Clark Street Tunnel to Brooklyn Heights. The station is between Fulton Street to the north and Clark Street in Brooklyn to the south.

The single island platform is between the two tracks, and is very narrow compared to other stations in the system. It has blue I-beam columns and dark blue floors tiles. The walls by the tracks have small "W" tablets on a mosaic trim except at the north end, where they have "WALL ST" written in black letters on white tablets over a green trim line. This is where the platform was extended in 1964–1965. The platform also has cooling fans. Fixed platform barriers, which are intended to prevent commuters falling to the tracks, are positioned near the platform edges.

There is a narrow full-length mezzanine above the platform that has mosaics pointing to, and connecting, all four station entrances.

=== Exits ===
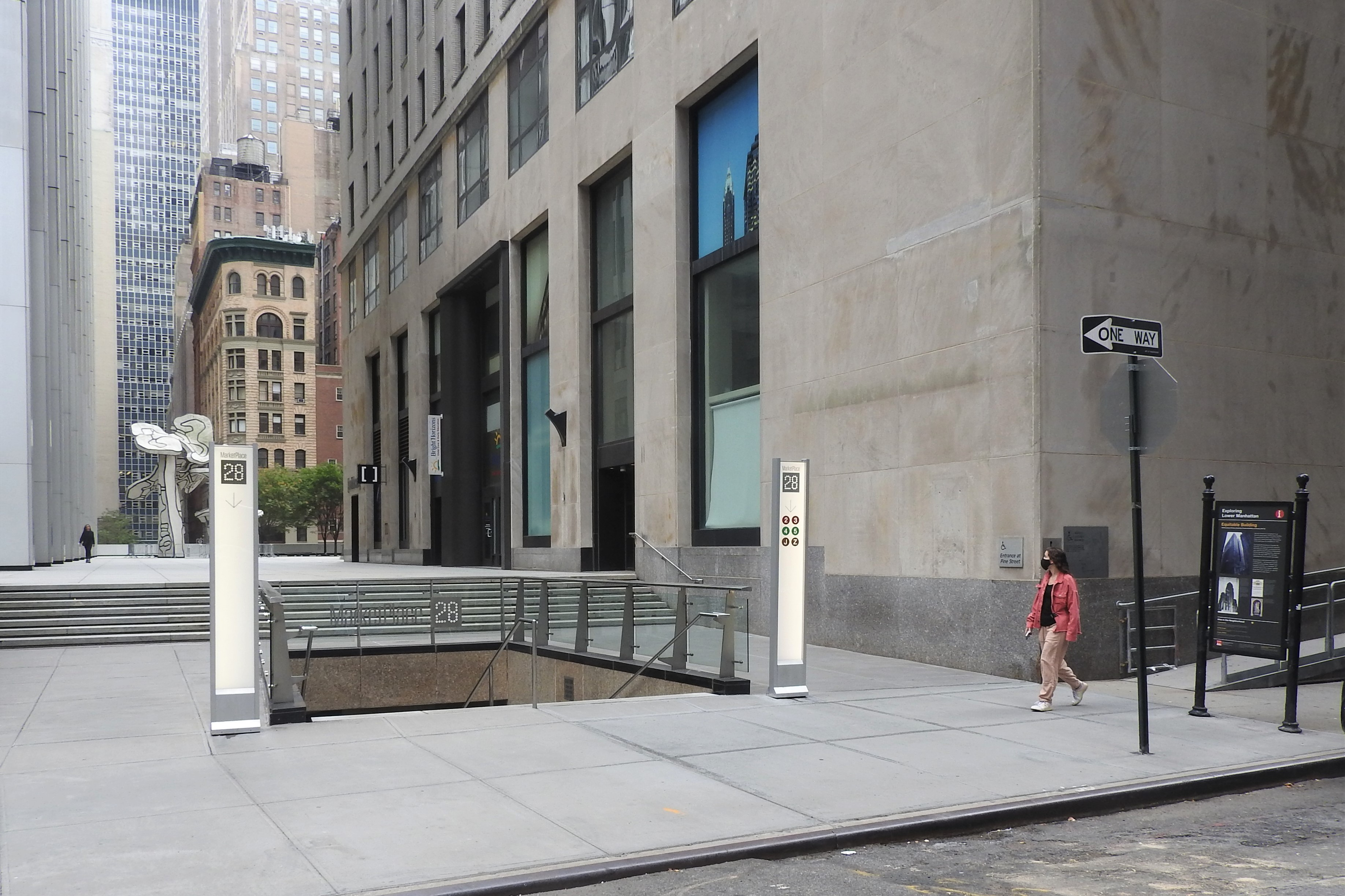
Entrance at Nassau and Cedar Streets, just outside 28 Liberty Street. This entrance also provides access to the Broad Street station (J and Z trains) and the Wall Street/Broadway station (4 and 5 trains).

This station has four sets of entrances/exits. The first exit is at the northern end of the station. It has a customer assistance booth with a bank of turnstiles and long passageway to a set of doors leading to the basement of 28 Liberty Street. A wide staircase leads to an entrance/exit at the east side of Nassau Street at Cedar Street. This entrance is only open on weekdays and also provides access to the Broad Street station (J and Z trains) and the Wall Street/Broadway station (4 and 5 trains).

The second exit, also open weekdays only, contains a bank of turnstiles and passageway to a spiral staircase that leads to Pine Street outside 60 Wall Street. The passageway has an artwork called Subway Wall by Harry Roseman made in 1990 and installed after a 1993 station renovation. This exit also has a set of doors to two escalators and a double-wide staircase that go up to the public atrium lobby of 60 Wall Street. This entrance has two red globes and overhead signs, giving the impression of an outdoor station entrance built in the lobby.

The third exit was the original entrance to the station and is staffed full-time. It has a bank of turnstiles and staircases to both northern corners of William and Wall Streets. The entrance at the northeast corner, outside 48 Wall Street, is made of ornate metal and has a sign reading "Interborough Rapid Transit Co-to All Trains."

The last exit is at the south end of the station, which leads to the same intersection as the third exit but is in a separate fare control area. A single double-wide staircase from the platform leads to two HEET turnstiles and two regular turnstiles. Staircases lead to both southern corners of William and Wall Streets; the southeastern corner exit is outside 55 Wall Street. This exit, though open at all times, is unstaffed as there is no token booth.

A fifth exit, which led to the southwestern corner of Pine Street and William Street, was closed after April 1992. An exit to the northeast corner of the same intersection was removed and slabbed over in 1948. The northeast-corner exit had been closed by 1944. Exits also existed to the northwest and southeast corners of the same intersection until some point after 1944.

== Image gallery ==
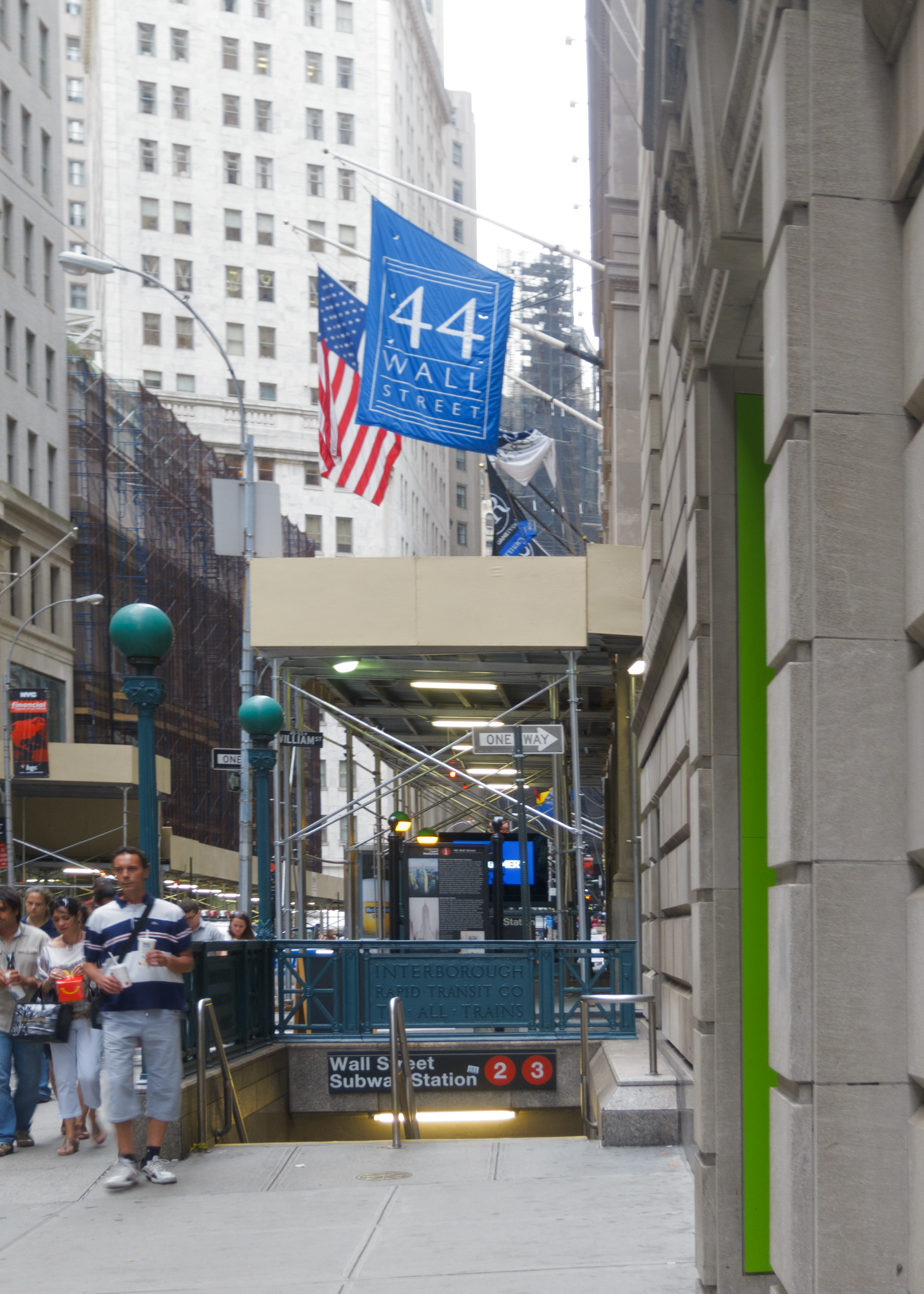
Entrance/exit from Wall Street

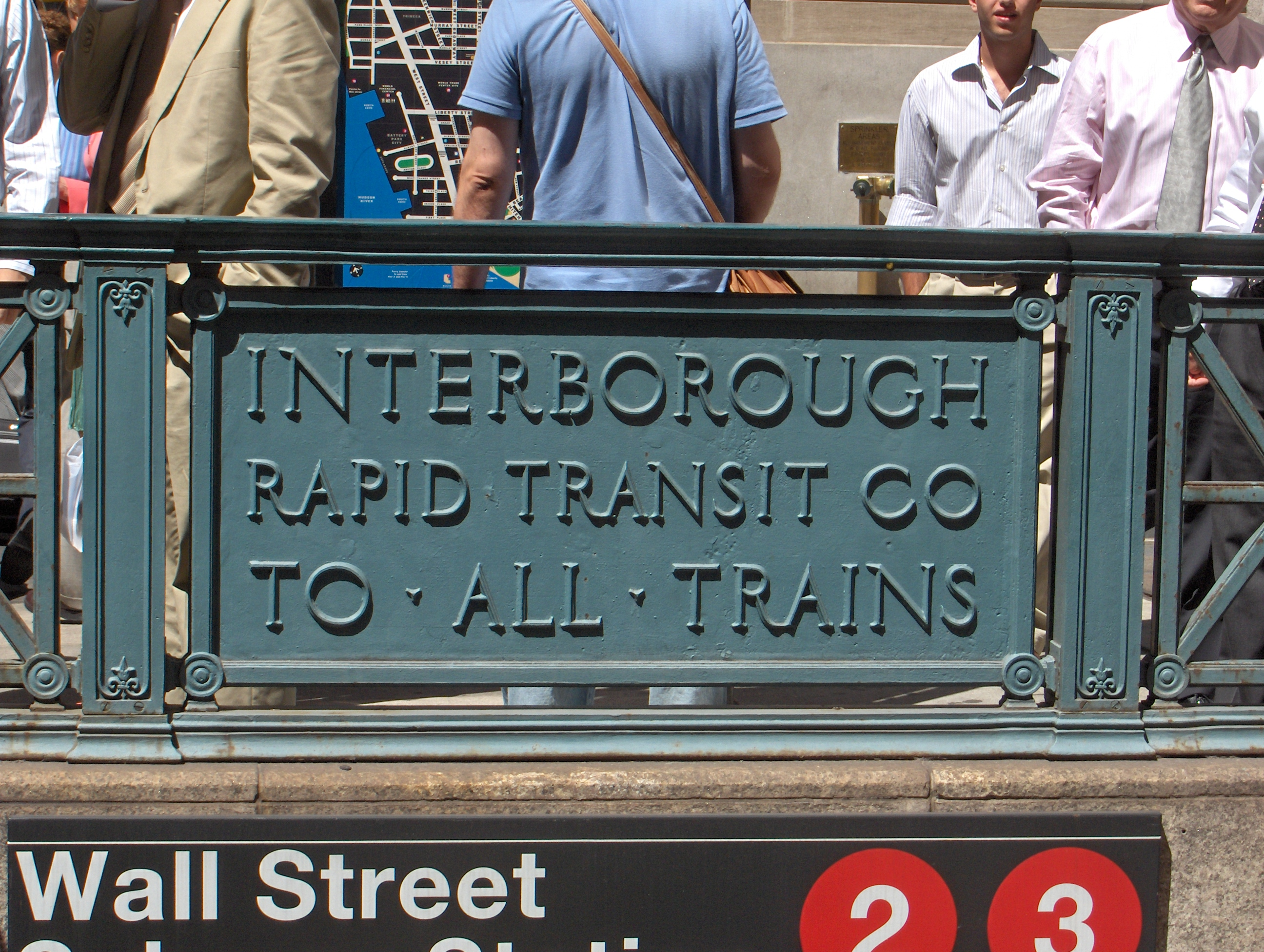
Old IRT sign at an entrance

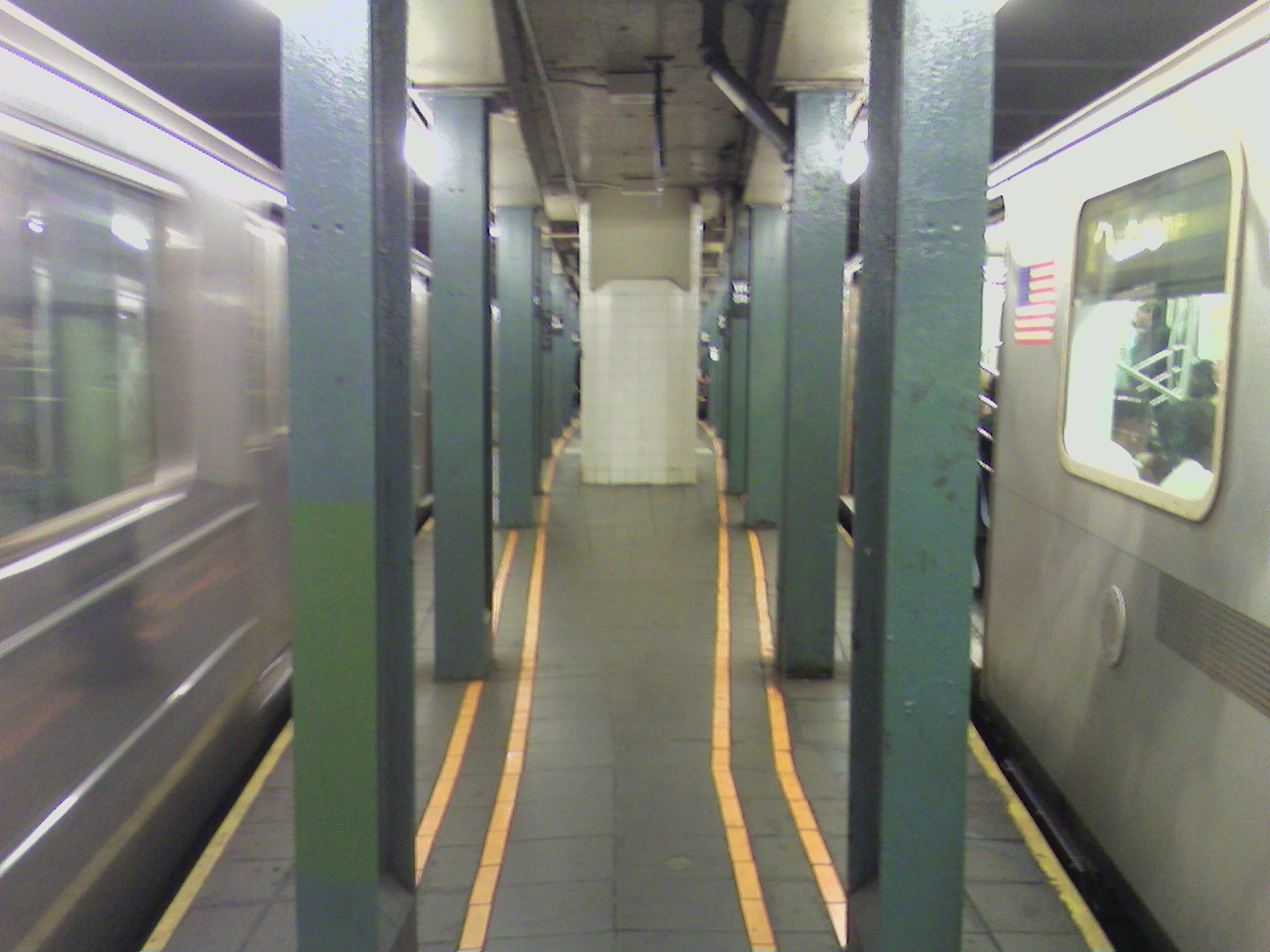
The platform viewed from the extremely narrow north end

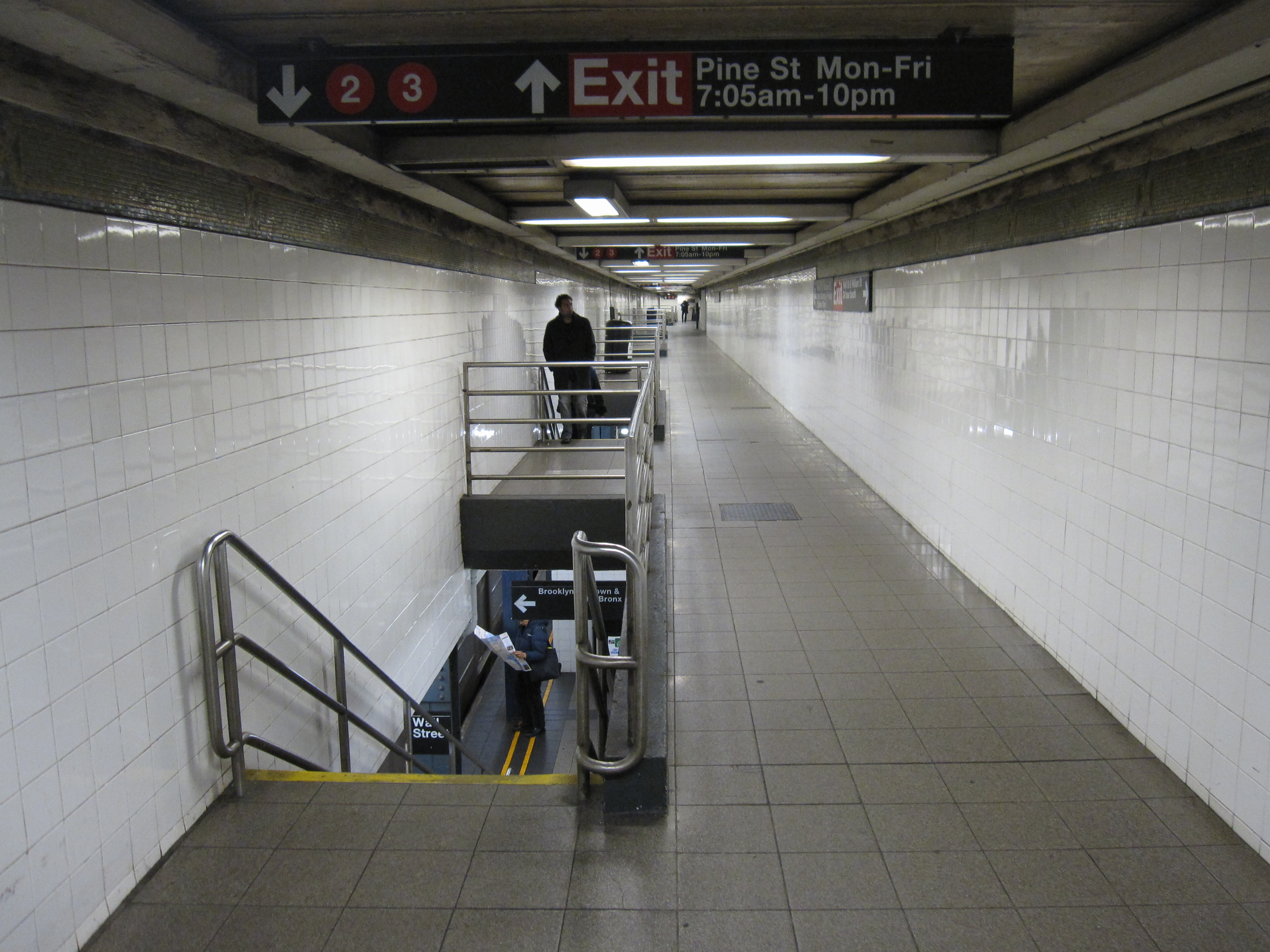
Mezzanine above the platforms

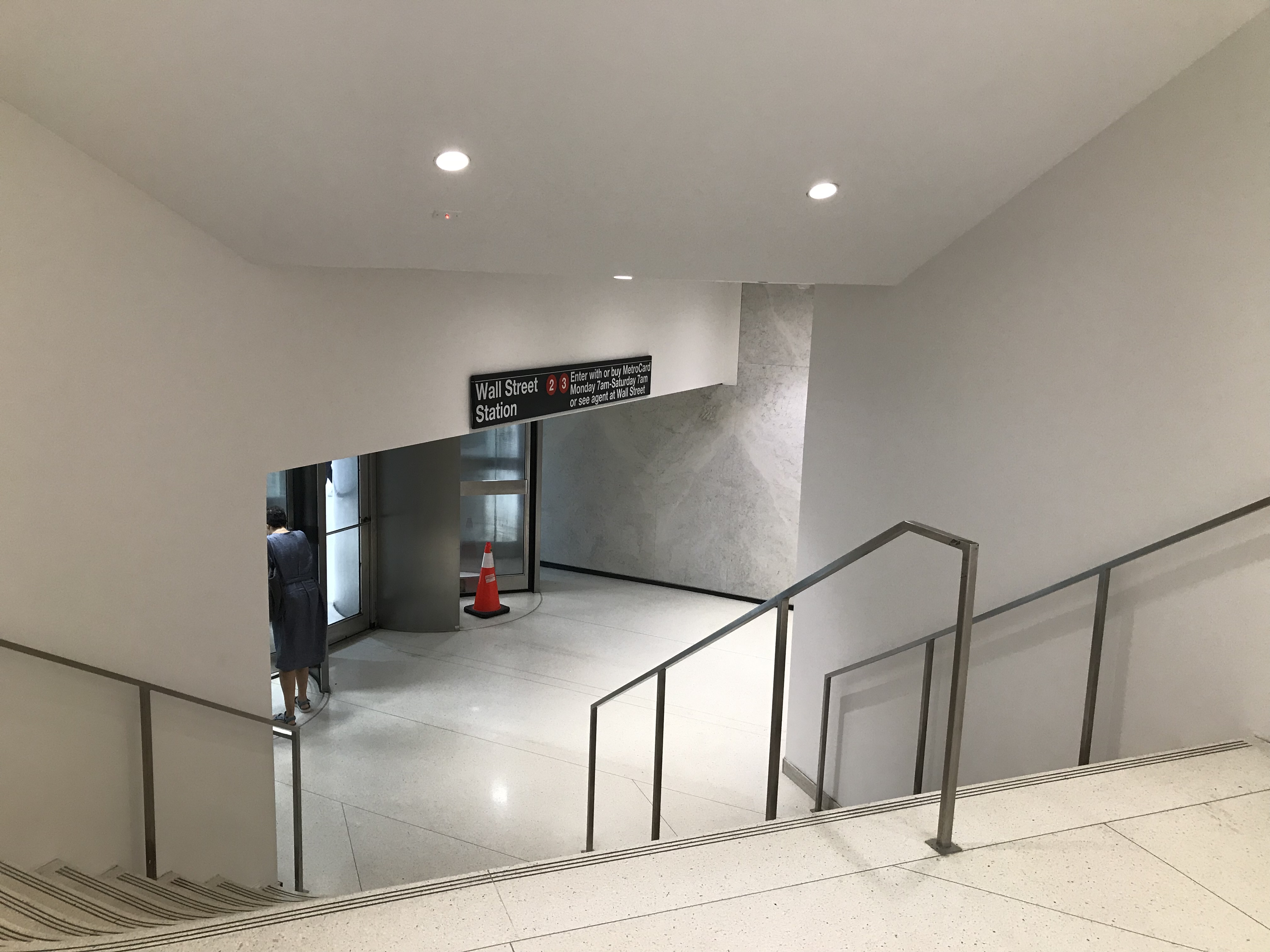
Entrance from 28 Liberty Street

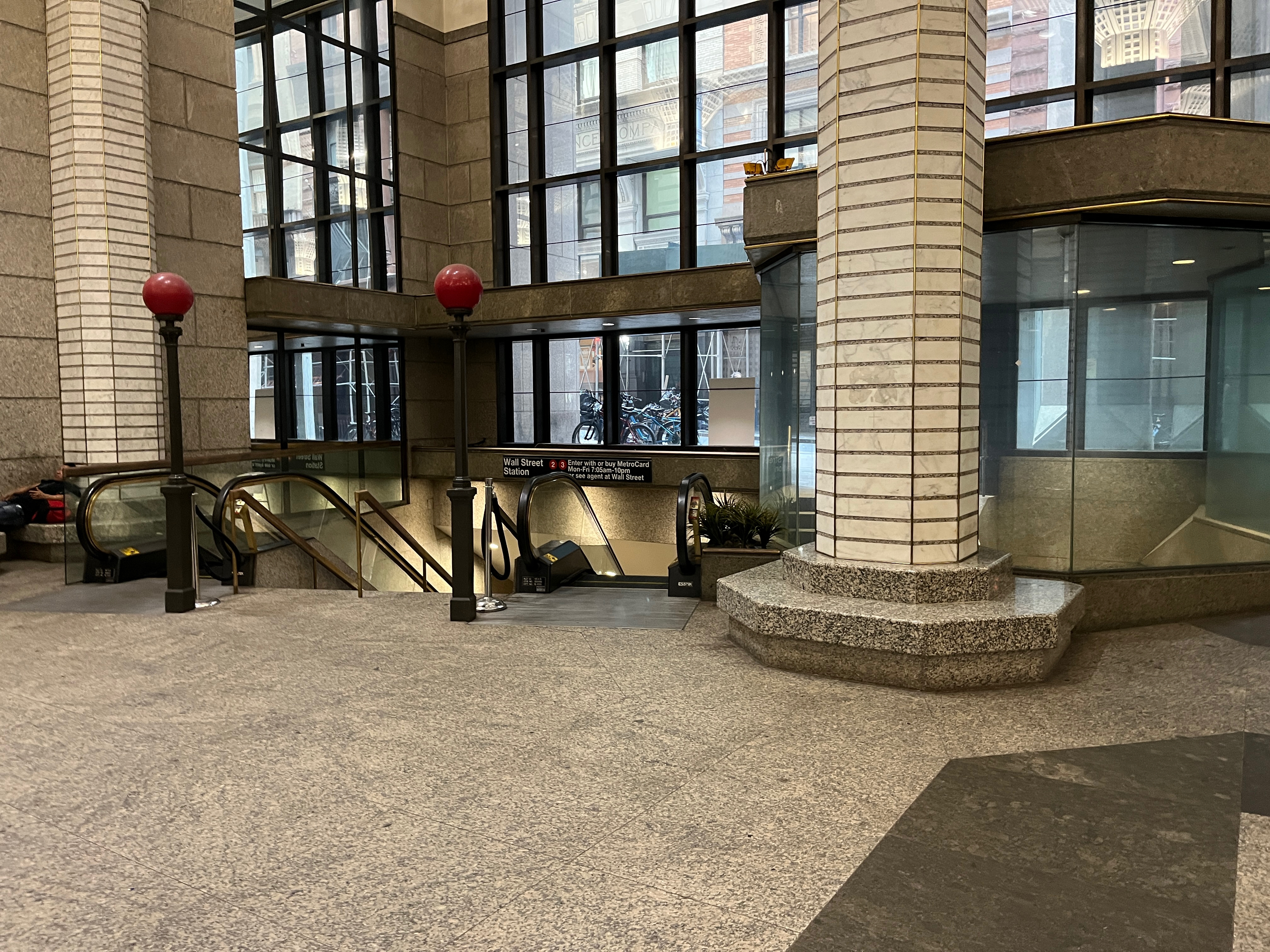
Part-time entrance from the lobby of 60 Wall Street
