= Alhambra Apartments =

Apartment building in Brooklyn, New York

Coordinates: 40°40′53″N 73°57′0″W

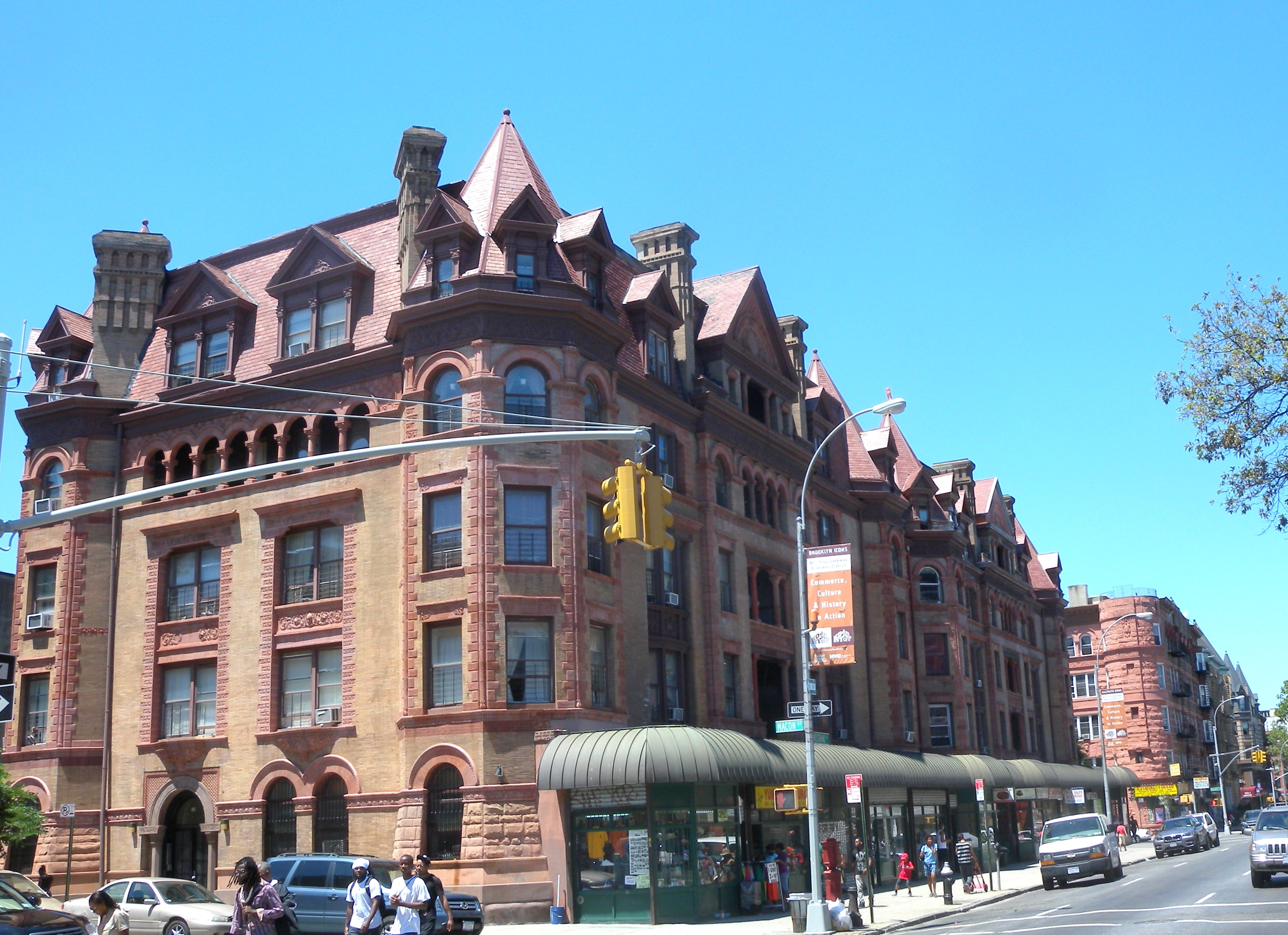
Alhambra Apartments, at Nostrand Ave. and Macon St.

The Alhambra Apartments is an apartment building at 500–518 Nostrand Avenue in the Bedford–Stuyvesant neighborhood of Brooklyn, New York.

The building was designed by Montrose Morris and built by developer Louis F. Seitz in 1889–90. It is an early example in the United States of a multiple-family building designed with large apartments for affluent tenants. The building, which features six towers and loggias, gables, arcades and elaborate terracotta decorations is across Nostrand Avenue from the architecturally notable Girls High School.

The New York City Landmarks Preservation Commission designated the Alhambra as a landmark in 1986.

== See also ==
- List of New York City Landmarks
