= Montrose Morris =

American architect

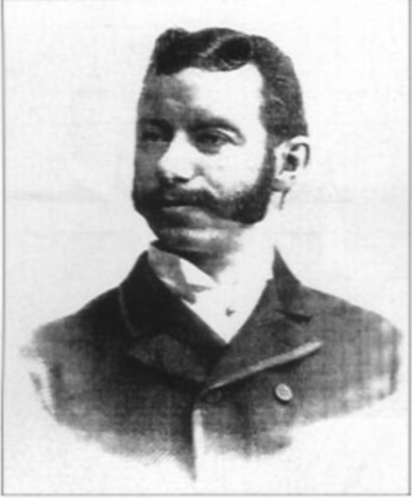
- Period portrait of Montrose W. Morris
- Born: March 20, 1861; Hempstead, Long Island, New York
- Died: April 14, 1916 (aged 55); Brooklyn, New York
- Occupation: Architect
- Known for: apartment houses, residences in Brooklyn, New York
- Notable work: Renaissance Apartments, Alhambra Apartments, Imperial Apartments, Clermont Apartments

Montrose W. Morris (March 20, 1861 – April 14, 1916) was an American architect from Brooklyn best known for some of the first multi-unit apartment buildings in New York City. His most well-known buildings include the Alhambra Apartments, Imperial Apartments, and the Renaissance Apartments all in Brooklyn, New York. Most of Morris’ work still stands, adding greatly to the borough's architectural heritage. Morris worked in the prevalent architectural styles of the period, including Queen Anne and Romanesque Revival.

== Life and education ==
Morris was born in Hempstead, Long Island on March 20, 1861. His family later moved to Brooklyn and he was educated at the Peekskill Academy. In 1876, he became an apprentice to Manhattan architect Charles W. Clinton, who, in concert with his partner, Hamilton Russell, was responsible for some of New York's most iconic buildings, including the Seventh Regiment Armory, the Graham Court Apartments, and the Masonic Temple (now the New York City Center). Morris was a veteran of Company H, 23rd Regiment, N.G., S.N.Y., a member of Grant Post and the Mistletoe Lodge No. 647, F.&A.M., of Lefferts Council, Royal Acanum, of the Union League Club and Montauk Club of Brooklyn, and the New England Society. He had two sons, Raymond M. and LeRoy C., who worked in his architectural practice starting in 1911; they carried on the firm in their father's name after his early death.

== Career ==
Morris opened his architectural office in 1883 in his early 20s. He advertised his services by designing and building his own residence on Hancock Street between Marcy and Tompkins Avenues in the Bedford Stuyvesant district, and then opened it to the public. One of the visitors was developer Louis F. Seitz, who later commissioned three apartment buildings from Morris.

Morris’ apartment buildings are among the earliest built in Brooklyn. During the 19th century, single-family row houses were the residential homes of choice for the middle class. Apartments or “flathouses” were considered inferior and there was a distinct prejudice against them. Only toward the end of the century did it become socially acceptable for the middle class to live in an apartment house. The high-quality of the design and richness of materials Morris used were intended to attract middle-class families.

Morris’ most productive years came in the two decades between 1885 and 1905. His most important works are located in all the most desirable Brooklyn neighborhoods: Brooklyn Heights, Fort Greene, Clinton Hill, Park Slope, and Bedford Stuyvesant.

== Death and legacy ==
Morris died in his home from unstated causes on April 14, 1916, at age 55.

Many of his buildings survive today and have been preserved through efforts of the communities around them. While Morris does not have the largest body of work, his buildings stand out for their innovative use of massing, shapes, materials, ornament, design elements, loggias, balconies and the unique way he combined all of these elements.

== Work ==
- 62 Montague Street, Brooklyn, 1887
- 232 Hancock Street, Brooklyn, New York, 1886
- 234 Hancock Street, Brooklyn, 1886 [Destroyed by fire, 1970s]
- 236-244 Hancock Street, Brooklyn, 1886
- 246-252 Hancock Street, Brooklyn, 1880s
- The Kelly Mansion, 247 Hancock Street, Brooklyn 1900
- Northside Savings Bank, Brooklyn, 1889
- 282-290 DeKalb Avenue, Brooklyn, 1889
- 285-289 DeKalb Avenue, Brooklyn, 1889
- Alhambra Apartments, Brooklyn, 1889–90
- 109 S 9th Street, Brooklyn, 1890
- William H. Beard House, 186 Clinton Avenue, Brooklyn, 1891
- Clermont Apartments, 79-81 Decatur Street, Brooklyn, 1891
- Imperial Apartments, Brooklyn, 1892
- Renaissance Apartments, Brooklyn, 1892
- Poly Prep Lower School - Henry Hulbert House, Brooklyn, 1892
- 315 Clinton Avenue, Brooklyn, 1890
- 515 Clinton Avenue, Brooklyn, 1893-4
- Clarence Walker Seamens residence, Brooklyn, 1900–03
- 16, 17, 18, 19, 21-22 Prospect Park West, Brooklyn, 1899-1901
- 100, 121, 123-129 Eighth Avenue, Brooklyn
- 76-82 St. Marks Avenue, Brooklyn, 1885
- 186 Clinton Avenue, Brooklyn, 1905
- 143-53 Eighth Avenue, Brooklyn, 1910–11
- Chatelaine Hotel, 1350 Bedford Avenue, Brooklyn, 1915-16
