= Renaissance Apartments =

- U.S. National Register of Historic Places
- New York City Landmark
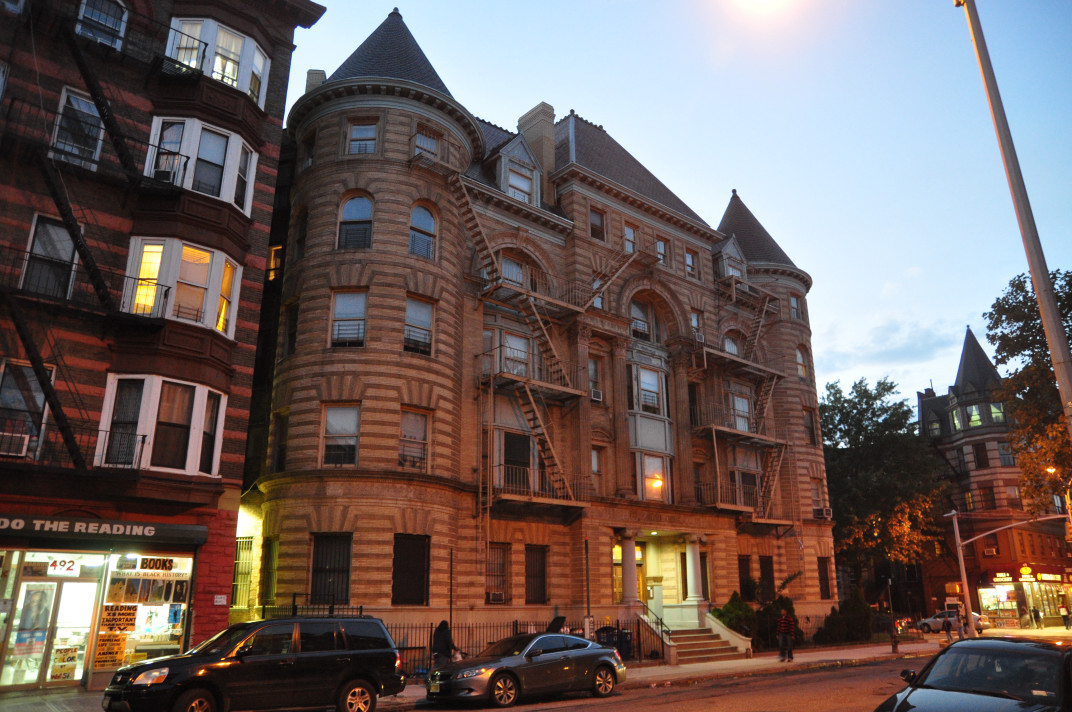
- September 2012

- Location within New York City Location within New York Location within the United States
- Location: 480 Nostrand Ave., Brooklyn, New York
- Coordinates: 40°40′56″N 73°57′1″W
- Area: less than one acre
- Built: 1892
- Architect: Morris, Montrose W.
- Architectural style: Renaissance
- NRHP reference No.: 95001026

Significant dates
- Added to NRHP: August 22, 1995
- Designated NYCL: March 18, 1986

Renaissance Apartments is a historic apartment building located at Hancock Street and Nostrand Avenue in Bedford-Stuyvesant, Brooklyn, New York City. It was built in 1892 and is a five-story masonry building in the French Renaissance style. It features elaborately decorated principal facades and prominent circular corner towers with slate covered conical roofs. It has steeply sloped slate mansard roofs with terra cotta ridge caps and gabled roof dormers.

It was listed on the National Register of Historic Places in 1995.

== See also ==
- List of New York City Landmarks
- National Register of Historic Places listings in Kings County, New York
