= Hotel St. George =

Building in Brooklyn, New York

Coordinates: 40.6978°N 73.9932°W

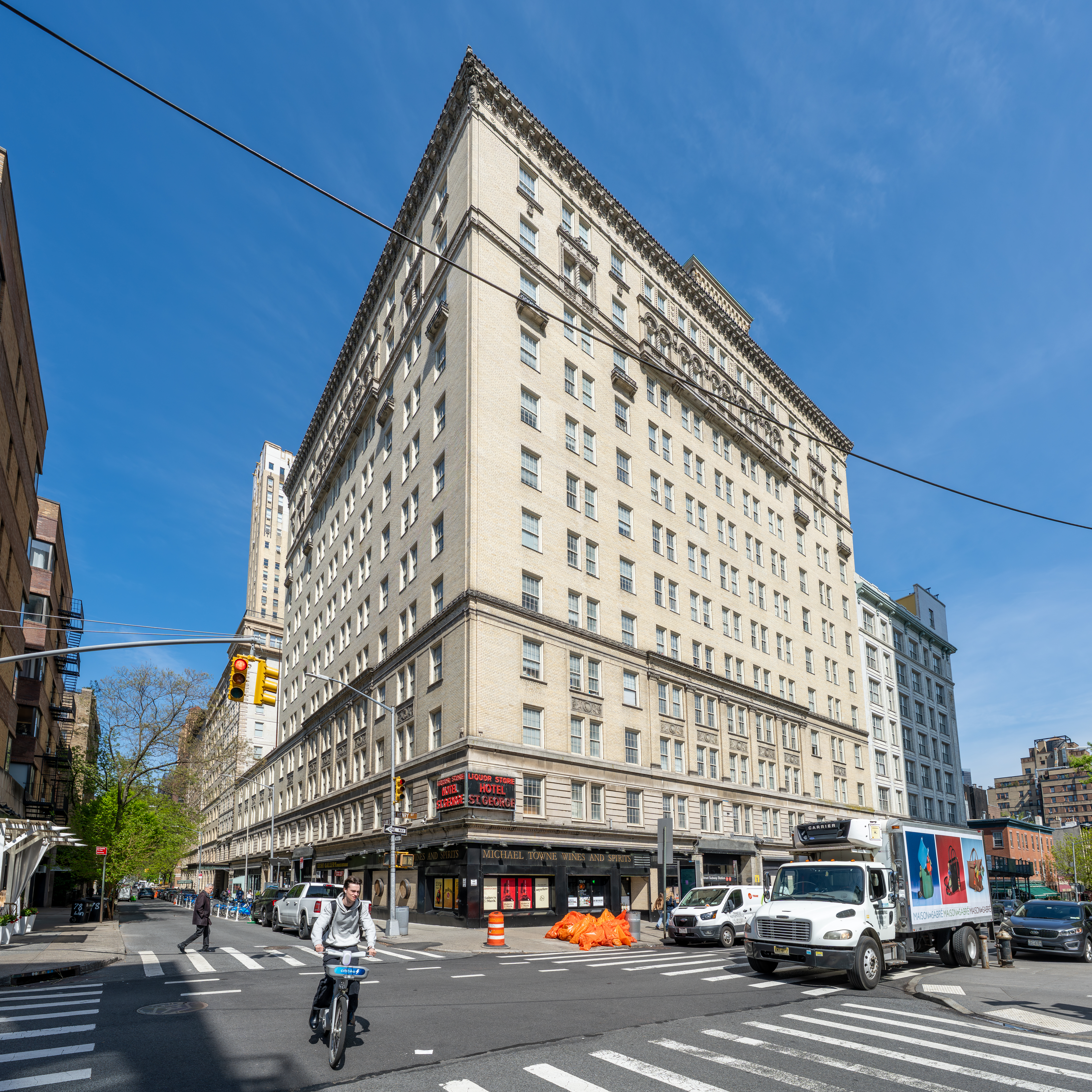
(2026)

The Hotel St. George is a building in Brooklyn Heights, Brooklyn, New York City. Built in sections between 1885 and 1930, the hotel was once the city's largest hotel, with 2,632 rooms at its peak. The hotel occupies the city block bounded by Pineapple Street, Henry Street, Clark Street, and Hicks Street.

The building complex consisted of eight attached structures, surrounding a courtyard, prior to a 1995 fire that destroyed two of the buildings. It is located atop the New York City Subway's Clark Street station, whose sole entrance is through the hotel's ground story. The hotel once had various amenities such as a saltwater swimming pool, a ballroom, and numerous restaurants.

The hotel, originally operated by Union Navy captain William Tumbridge, was designed by Augustus Hatfield as a 10-story structure and was expanded over the years. Tumbridge hired Montrose Morris to design two additions in 1898 and 1913. After Tumbridge died in 1921, his son sold the hotel to Bing & Bing, which hired Emery Roth to design additional expansions in 1924 and 1928. The hotel was completed on March 21, 1930, and became a popular venue for events and military personnel over the next three decades.

The St. George's patronage began to decline in 1950, with long-term residents making up the majority of the clientele. The hotel was sold three times during the 1960s and was mostly vacant by the early 1970s. Four of the hotel's eight buildings were renovated and converted to apartments between 1978 and 1984. The building survived a large 1995 fire and has been used as student dormitories since the late 1990s.

== Description ==
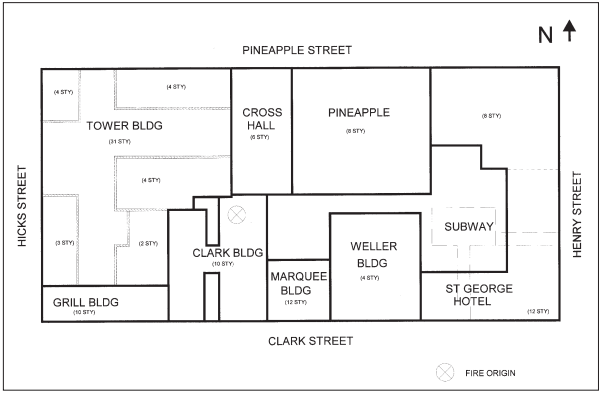
St. George Hotel Complex – building layout

The Hotel St. George is located at 111 Hicks Street (also known as 44 Pineapple Street). It has 30 floors and 275 units, covers a lot area of 23,325 square feet (2,167.0 m^{2}), and has a gross floor area of 441,063 square feet (40,976.1 m^{2}). The hotel occupies the entire city block between Pineapple Street to the north, Henry Street to the east, Clark Street to the south, and Hicks Street to the west. Prior to the 1995 fire that gutted the Hotel St. George, the building complex consisted of eight attached structures, surrounding a courtyard. These consisted of the Clark, Grill, Tower, Crosshall, Pineapple, Weller, and Marquee buildings, as well as the hotel itself at the eastern end of the block.

=== Buildings ===
The 10-story Grill Building was at the southwestern corner of the block. The Grill Building measured 25 feet (7.6 m) on Hicks Street and 100 feet (30 m) on Clark Street. The Tower Building, a 31-story or 32-story building on the northwestern corner of the block at 111 Hicks Street, measured 175 feet (53 m) on Hicks Street and 150 feet (46 m) on Pineapple Street. Built in 1929 as a steel-frame structure, the Tower Building connected to the Grill Building in its basement. The portion of the Tower Building on Pineapple Street was originally a separate structure known as the St. George Apartments. The tower was topped by a 480-million-candlepower beacon that could be seen from 10 mi (16 km) away before being deactivated in 1931. By the 1990s, the original Tower building, the old St. George Apartments, and the Grill Building had all been combined into one residential building known as the Tower Building.

East of the Tower Building were the six-story Crosshall Building and the eight-story Pineapple Building. The Crosshall Building had a 50-foot (15 m) frontage on Pineapple Street, while the Pineapple Building was located at 60 Pineapple Street and had a 115-foot (35 m) frontage; both buildings were 90 feet (27 m) deep. The easternmost 115 feet (35 m) of the block was the "St. George Hotel Building", the only operating portion of the hotel by the 1990s. The structure had a frontage of over 200 feet (61 m) on Henry Street, extending the entire block between Pineapple and Clark Streets; it rose eight stories on Pineapple Street and twelve stories on Clark Street. The hotel had entrances from Clark and Henry Streets, and the New York City Subway's Clark Street station was accessed from the lobby.

On Clark Street were three structures. Just west of the St. George Hotel were the Weller and Marquee buildings, respectively; both measured 50 feet (15 m) wide and 85 feet (26 m) deep. The Weller Building was four stories tall, while the Marquee Building was twelve stories tall; fire doors separated the Weller and Marquee buildings. To the west of the Marquee Building was the Clark Building, a 10-story building, was located at 51 Clark Street with a frontage of 75 feet (23 m) and a depth of 90 feet (27 m). At one time, the Grill and Clark buildings had been connected at each floor level with overhead rolling fire doors at the openings, but the doorways were sealed on the Grill Building side when the Clark Building closed. A one-story covered courtyard was located near the western end of the middle of the block. The Clark Building was destroyed in a fire in 1995.

=== Features ===
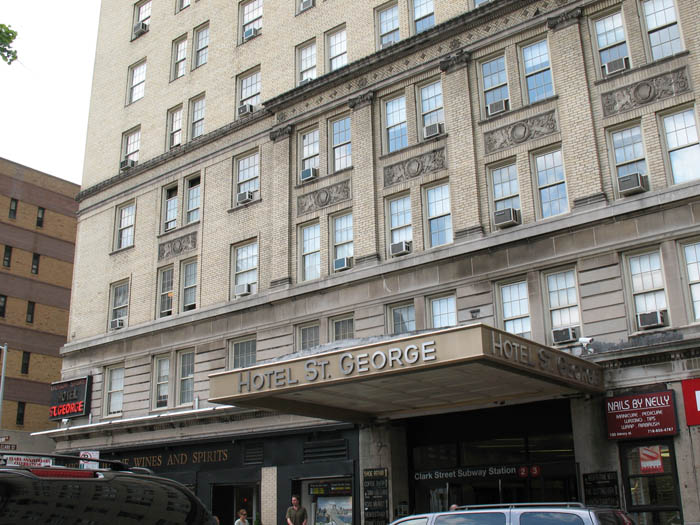
Henry Street entrance prior to August 3, 2025 awning collapse

In its heyday, the hotel had 2,632 guest rooms, one thousand full-time employees, could accommodate nearly three thousand people for a dance, and could provide food for seven thousand guests at any one time.

==== Amenities ====
The hotel had various amenities including hot rooms, a billiards room, a card room, a library, a gym, and a roof garden. In the basement of the St. George Tower was a natatorium, which contained a saltwater swimming pool with saunas, steam rooms, and locker rooms. The pool was cited as measuring either 40 by 100 feet (12 by 30 m); 40 by 120 feet (12 by 37 m); or 40 by 145 feet (12 by 44 m). The natatorium was designed by Willy Pogany and contained underwater lights; walls with gold mirrors; columns with gold-and-green tiles; and a balcony with white-on-black reliefs. The balcony surrounding the pool could accommodate 2,000 spectators. Builders excavated six wells to a depth of 110 feet (34 m), which could supply water to the pool at a rate of 650 U.S. gallons per minute (41 L/s); the saltwater from the wells had a quarter of the salinity of ocean water. At the time of the pool's construction, the natatorium was the only part of the hotel that received power from the New York City electrical grid; the rest of the hotel generated its own power.

The other spaces were designed by Winold Reiss in the Art Deco style. Among these was a triple-height ballroom without columns, known as the Colorama Ballroom. The ballroom measured 116 by 136 feet (35 by 41 m) and had a ceiling measuring either 31 feet (9.4 m) or 33 feet (10 m) high. The ballroom had a black floor, white walls, a white ceiling, and multicolored reflectors operated by a "color organ"; the illuminated reflectors provided all of the room's decoration. Four double trusses, each weighing 150 short tons (130 long tons; 140 t), supported the weight of the tower above the ballroom.

==== Upper stories ====
The easternmost wing of the hotel (the St. George Hotel Building) was designed in 1924 by Emery Roth and included about 370 rooms. This portion of the hotel was built above a storefront whose owners still held a lease on the site, as well as the entrance to the Clark Street subway station; as a result, the easternmost wing was built with large girders, carrying it above the New York City Subway's Clark Street station and a store. Elevators, stairways, and mechanical systems were placed in an adjacent eight-story laundry building and attached to the easternmost wing. The laundry building was converted into loft apartments with large windows and high ceilings.

The St. George Tower, at the northwestern corner, had 1,200 rooms and was intended as a "club residence for men and women". The apartments were intended for young professionals with low incomes. Some floors were occupied exclusively by men, while others only had women as residents. Each apartment contained little more than a closet and a sink, and all of the floors had shared restrooms with showers, bathtubs, and toilets. After an expansion in 1930, the hotel had two radio receivers, which were connected to a system of 37 loudspeakers installed throughout the hotel.

Since 1984, the Tower, Grill, Crosshall, and Pineapple buildings have contained luxury apartments. Most of the rental apartments are studios, which range from 450 to 500 square feet (42 to 46 m^{2}), and one-bedroom units, which range from 700 to 750 square feet (65 to 70 m^{2}). Some of the rental units are two-bedroom apartments with up to 1,000 square feet (93 m^{2}). There were originally 73 apartments in the Crosshall and Pineapple buildings and 301 apartments in the Tower and Grill buildings. By the late 1990s, some of the apartments had been combined.

== History ==
=== Early history ===
Prior to the construction of the current Hotel St. George, the site had contained a tavern called the St. George, which operated from the mid-1770s to 1783.

==== 1880s and 1890s ====
The current hotel was established in either 1884 or 1885 by William Tumbridge, a South African–born Union Navy captain. Tumbridge funded the hotel's construction using earnings from the financial industry. The original portion was designed by Augustus Hatfield as a 10-story structure; it was clad with red brick and contained 130 guestrooms. The hotel was ornate for its time; there were bowling alleys and Turkish baths, as well as an air-cooling system and dedicated electrical generators. In addition, the St. George had an elaborate lobby with mosaics, marble, and Tiffany glass, in addition to restaurants.

The hotel's success led Tumbridge to build a 360-room annex on Clark Street in 1886. In January 1887, the Hotel St. George announced plans for a five-story annex facing Hicks Street near Clark Street. Over the years, Tumbridge expanded the hotel along Pineapple Street. A 210-room annex on Pineapple Street was completed in 1891, bringing the hotel to 800 guestrooms.

In 1898, Tumbridge hired Montrose Morris to design a ten-story annex along Clark Street with a rooftop terrace and flagpoles. At the time, the building had 780 guestrooms and a ballroom that could fit 750 people, although Tumbridge had been forced to turn away guests the preceding years. The renovations, costing an estimated $200,000, would increase the capacity to 1,000 guestrooms.

==== 1900s and 1910s ====
By the 1900s, the St. George accommodated both long-term residents and short-term visitors. Among the long-term residents were NAACP founder Mary White Ovington, who lived there in 1905. After workers discovered gold while cleaning an artesian well near the center of the hotel's site in 1906, gold miners flocked to the area.

In June 1913, Morris filed plans for an eight-story addition at Pineapple and Henry Streets, which was to contain 200 rooms. The annex, replacing three old houses, would cost $100,000 and was expected to increase the hotel's capacity to over 2,000 guestrooms. Three elevators, leading to the Interborough Rapid Transit Company's Clark Street station just beneath the hotel, were installed at the St. George's ground story in 1919. Tumbridge continued to operate the hotel until he died in 1921. Afterward, his son John William Tumbridge decided to sell the hotel.

=== 1920s expansion ===
The firm of Bing & Bing bought the hotel in November 1922, at which point the St. George was valued at $3 million. The firm planned to erect a 400-room annex of up to 15 stories. S. W. Straus lent Bing & Bing $2.75 million in August 1923 to construct the expansion. Bing & Bing hired Emery Roth in 1924 to design a 12-story Italian Renaissance-style annex at the corner of Clark and Henry Street. The 400-room annex expanded the hotel's capacity to 1,200 rooms, making it the fourth-largest hotel in the New York metropolitan area. The lobbies and parlors were renovated, and the interior of the original building was redecorated. The expansion on Henry Street opened on January 19, 1925.

Bing & Bing subsidiary Clark-Henry Corporation had acquired the remaining lots on the city block, which measured 200 by 400 feet (61 by 122 m), by February 1928. The same month, a powerful revolving beacon atop the hotel was illuminated for the first time. The owners rehired Roth to design a tower, and they submitted plans for a 25-story tower to the city government at the end of February 1928. This tower added over a thousand rooms, as well as a ballroom, studio apartments, and a saltwater swimming pool. Demolition of existing buildings on the site began in August 1928. To fund the hotel's construction, the Clark-Henry Corporation obtained a $8.5 million loan and sold $8 million of bonds in October 1928. Shortly afterward, the planned tower was revised to 31 stories. The superstructure of the tower was built within 85 days and was finished in August 1929. An "Egyptian Roof" room was also added to the hotel in 1929.

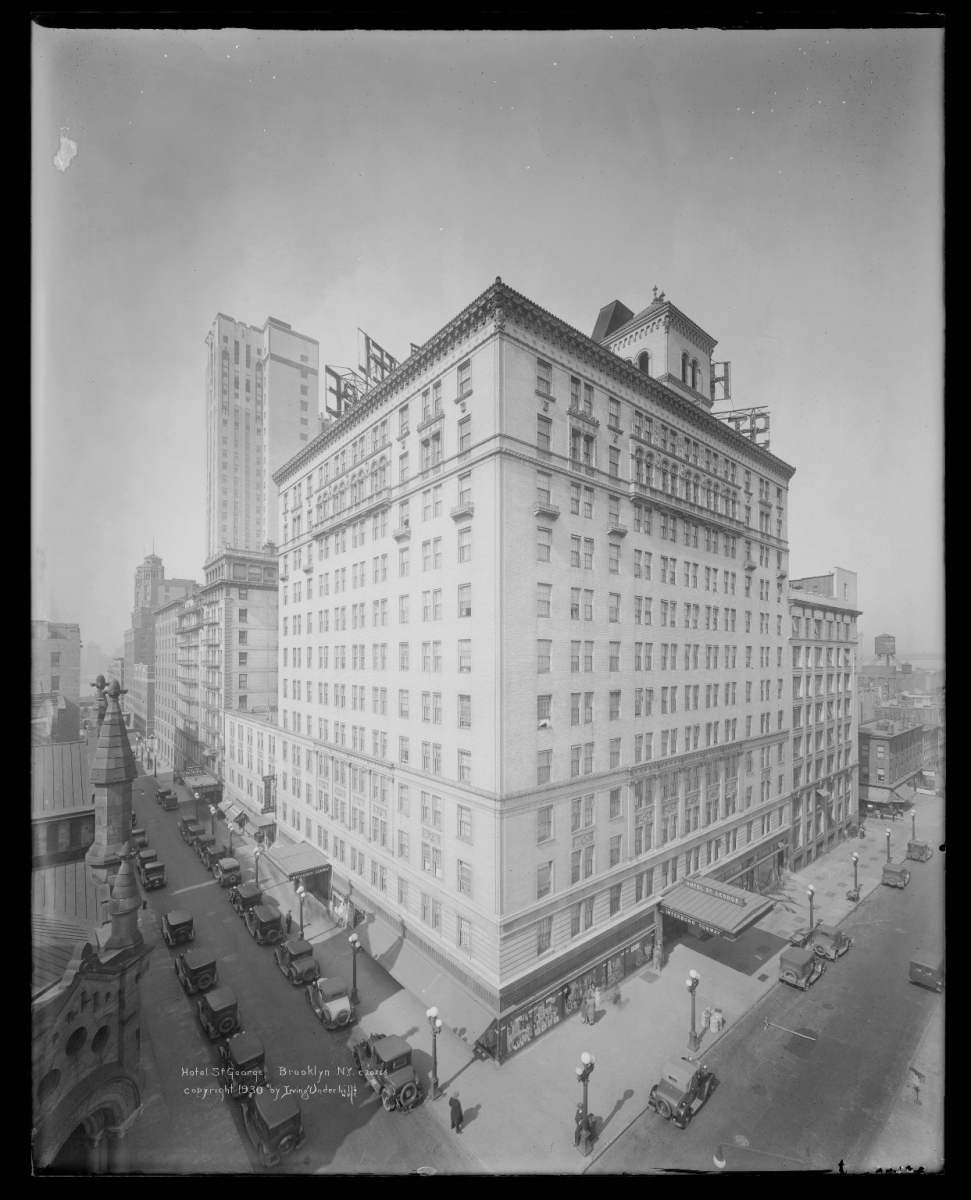
Hotel St George in the 1930s

The second expansion opened on March 21, 1930. With 2,632 rooms, the expanded St. George was New York City's largest hotel by number of rooms, surpassing Manhattan's New Yorker Hotel. The St. George was also the United States' second-largest hotel, after the Stevens Hotel in Chicago, and was four times as large as Brooklyn's next-largest hotel, the 600-room Leverich Towers. After its renovation, the St. George had more than 2,100 employees. Its restaurants could accommodate 9,000 diners simultaneously, while the guestrooms could accommodate 3,500 people per night. Long-term residents paid between $240 and $280 per month for a four-room apartment. The hotel's beacon was deactivated in 1931 because federal officials thought pilots could mistake the beacon for an airport.

=== Mid-20th century ===
The New York Times wrote in 2009 that, at the hotel's peak, "the St. George was a beacon that attracted some of the brightest lights in American society". Before World War II, the St. George was a popular venue for society gatherings, weddings, and celebrations. According to the hotel's manager Norman H. Free, the hotel had served actors, authors, sailors, and athletes in its heyday, as well as U.S. presidents Franklin D. Roosevelt, Harry S. Truman, and John F. Kennedy. The St. George was so well known that Eli Danzig, who led the hotel's band, was invited to perform at a ball celebrating Roosevelt's first inauguration in 1933. The author Truman Capote frequented the St. George's swimming pool, as did swimmers such as Buster Crabbe, Eleanor Holm, and Johnny Weissmuller. The ballroom regularly hosted celebrities and members of high society, while its Stardust Room hosted guests like Laraine Day, Leo Durocher, and Lady Iris Mountbatten. The hotel's Egyptian Rooftop Club was also popular with actors such as Katharine Hepburn, Frank Sinatra, and Spencer Tracy.

==== 1930s to early 1960s ====
Beginning in May 1933, income from the hotel was placed in a trust for bondholders. The next month, the hotel's trustees foreclosed on an $8.2 million mortgage that had been placed on the property. A committee led by Alvin J. Schlosser asked the New York Supreme Court in March 1934 for permission to reorganize the Clark-Henry Corporation, which operated the hotel. That July, a group of creditors sued in an attempt to force the Clark-Henry Corporation's reorganization. A state judge approved Schlosser's reorganization plan in February 1935. The owners filed plans for $60,000 worth of alterations in August 1935, and an auction for the building was scheduled the same month. The hotel was sold for $2.5 million at that auction. The owners began a $150,000 renovation of the hotel in October 1935. The work included renovating the main dining room, redecorating several private dining rooms, and refurbishing the facade. Ultimately, Bing & Bing were allowed to continue operating the hotel, and their existing mortgage was extended.

The St. George remained popular in the late 1940s, accommodating two million guests in 1946 alone. A ticket office for eight airlines opened in the hotel in 1947. During World War II and the Korean War, the hotel was used to lodge troops and their families traveling to or returning from their military assignments. In particular, the hotel was used by members of the Armed Forces who were stationed at military installations in Brooklyn, such as Floyd Bennett Field, Fort Hamilton, the Brooklyn Navy Yard, and the Brooklyn Army Terminal. Members of the Armed Forces began to move away from Brooklyn in the early 1950s, and these installations gradually closed, causing demand for the St. George's hotel rooms to decline. During the 1950s and early 1960s, the hotel's occupancy rates decreased, exacerbated by the hotel's poor management and the construction of several large hotels in Midtown Manhattan.

Milton Kestenberg of the Hotel St. George Corporation announced in July 1961 that he would spend $2 million renovating the hotel's ballrooms. In addition, Kestenberg planned to add a health club next to the swimming pool, and he wished to renovate the facade to complement the design of nearby civic buildings in Downtown Brooklyn. The project was finished the next year.

==== Bankruptcy and sales ====
The hotel filed for bankruptcy in May 1963. At the time, 580 of the rooms had been shuttered permanently, and either 1,500 or 1,900 long-term tenants lived at the hotel. A bankruptcy auction for the St. George was hosted in December 1963, in which the minimum offer price was $3.6 million, but no one bid on the hotel. By then, 1,300 bondholders had invested a collective $3.2 million into the building, which was losing $60,000 per month. The hotel was sold at a second auction in January 1964, where the bondholders were expected to recover only 65 to 70 percent of their original investment. The winning bidder, Vantar Properties, had offered to pay $2.3 million entirely in cash, or $2.5 million if they paid $900,000 in cash assumed the existing $1.6 million mortgage. The next month, a federal judge ruled that Vantar could pay $2.5 million in cash for the hotel.

Vantar subsequently went bankrupt, and it sold the building in July 1965 to a Hong Kong investment group led by T. F. Mok for $3.85 million. Mok's group paid $690,000 in cash and received a $3.16 million mortgage from Vantar. The new owners began renovating the St. George into a mixed apartment house and short-term hotel, with plans to offer half the apartments to short-term guests and half to long-term residents. They hired developer Murray Waynthal to refurbish the hallways and rooms, replace carpets, add furniture and curtains. During the Northeast blackout of 1965, people flocked to the St. George because it was the only large structure in the area that still generated its own power.

Charles H. Kelman bought the St. George in 1968 for $4 million, assuming responsibility for the hotel's mortgage. The hotel's new owners announced plans to spend $3 million on renovations, fixing issues such as leaky pipes and peeling paint. Occupancy rates continued to dwindle. While the St. George continued to attract business travelers and nostalgic tourists, it no longer appealed to the general public. By 1970, the New York City government was using the St. George as a welfare hotel for homeless families. The hotel housed as many as 28 homeless families, all of whom had moved out by 1972. The next year, the hotel's managers ordered 400 mostly elderly residents of the St. George Tower to relocate to another portion of the hotel, as management could no longer afford the tower's upkeep. The managers claimed that the move would increase security by consolidating all residents into one building, but residents of the tower claimed that their new apartments were both more expensive and dirty. The hotel was renovated in 1974.

=== Partial closure and split ownership ===
After the St. George's owners failed to pay taxes on the hotel's mortgage, Vantar foreclosed on the mortgage in March 1975. By then, only about one-third of its 2,000 rooms were occupied, some sections or whole floors were unused and in poor repair, and the hotel employed only 40 full-time staff. The hotel's owners planned to convert most of the building to offices, leaving only 500 hotel rooms. The owners also planned to close the swimming pool; at the time, it cost $0.36 per U.S. gallon ($0.095/L) to heat the pool, more than six times as much as the heating cost seven years prior. The natatorium was in such poor condition that parts of the ceiling had fallen into the pool. The same year, the hotel's tower stopped accepting new guests. The complex was split into two ownership units in 1978: the buildings on Pineapple and Hicks Streets became apartments, while those on Clark and Henry Streets were either vacant or continued to operate as a hotel.

==== Co-op conversion ====
Developer Herbert Handman announced in May 1976 that he would spend $11 million to convert the vacant Tower Building to 392 rental apartments. The project would also include a new health club around the swimming pool. If the renovation were successful, Handman would renovate the seven other buildings on the block. By 1977, Martin J. Raynes had taken over the project and had hired Henry George Greene as architect. In addition to the Tower Building, Raynes would buy the Crosshall and Pineapple buildings (which were also empty) and the Grill Building (which was still occupied). Raynes requested a tax abatement in March 1977 to defray the costs of the renovation. The New York City Board of Estimate approved the renovation the next month. As part of the agreement, Raynes would receive a tax abatement from the Urban Development Corporation (UDC), which would buy the four buildings and lease it to the developer for a nominal sum. The development was to be largely funded by a $7.85 million syndicated loan originated by the Lincoln Savings Bank.

The Starrett Brothers agreed to develop the apartments in March 1978, and construction began the next month after the UDC acquired the buildings. At the time, the project entailed converting the Tower Building to 272 apartments, as well as adding 14 "professional offices", constructing a health club, and renovating the hotel's subway entrance. During the renovations, many co-op tenants complained of the poor quality of the renovations, claiming that the apartments had issues such as exposed wires, peeling wallpaper, and uneven paint schemes. Raynes's firm MJR Development Corporation opened 73 cooperative apartments within the Crosshall and Pineapple buildings in 1982. MJR renovated the Grill and Tower buildings into 301 rental apartments in 1984 at a cost of $15 million. The health club was built within the rental portion of the complex. The Tower Building was also illuminated at night starting in 1984.

==== Remainder of the hotel ====
The four remaining buildings on Clark and Henry Streets were owned by the Clark Operating Corporation. The three buildings on Clark Street were abandoned (although Clark Operating wished to eventually convert the buildings to 140 apartments), while the easternmost structure on Henry Street functioned as a long-term residential hotel. The remaining residents, most of whom were elderly, were relocated to a single section of the building. The hotel subsequently became known for its high rate of muggings and other crimes. Homeless people trespassed into abandoned portions of the St. George, and the ground floor contained a topless club, Wild Fyre. The New York Times wrote that electronic appliances were "thrown out the hotel windows with disturbing frequency". The Drizin family acquired the remaining portion of the hotel in 1986 and attempted to renovate it, but they abandoned their plans because of a moratorium on single-room occupancy conversions and declining demand for real estate in the city. In the meantime, the hotel continued to physically deteriorate.

In 1990, the Drizin family agreed to lease some rooms to the New York City government for the elderly, Russian emigres, Red Cross disaster victims, and homeless people with HIV/AIDS. In exchange, the owners received $840 per month from the city government. As part of an agreement with local community groups, the New York City Human Resources Administration (HRA) promised to house up to 65 people with HIV/AIDS at the hotel. Despite this promise, the hotel had more than 65 residents with HIV/AIDS on several occasions. The HRA acknowledged in late 1992 that it did not know how many of its clients lived at the hotel. The Drizins sued local civic group Brooklyn Heights Association in November 1992, alleging that the group used "racism and intimidation" to prevent the hotel from accommodating more HIV/AIDS residents, but the lawsuit was unsuccessful. The city proposed opening a 600-seat school in two of the vacant hotel buildings in 1994, but these plans were postponed due to opposition from local residents. The city still paid 80 residents' rent by 1995.

=== 1995 fire ===
Large parts of the hotel complex were damaged in a 16-alarm fire on August 26, 1995, in the city's largest fire in over two decades. The St. George Hotel's guests first reported smoke at 3 a.m., but the hotel's staff did not contact the New York City Fire Department (FDNY) because its alarm system did not indicate any issues. Although firefighters arrived at the hotel in 3:36 a.m., they were initially unable to locate the fire. The FDNY eventually identified the fire as having come from the Clark Building. After firefighters entered the building, they discovered that the building's standpipe was not functional, during which time the fire spread rapidly. By the time firefighters connected the hose to a standpipe outside the building, the fire had begun to produce a large volume of fire brands, some of which drifted into apartments. As additional companies arrived, they began evacuating the buildings on Clark and Hicks Streets, and the top floors of the Clark and Marquee buildings burned down. More than 700 firefighters and 100 companies ultimately responded to the fire, which was declared under control at 7:09 a.m. Although no one died in the fire, it took many days to extinguish all the fires and spot fires in the area.

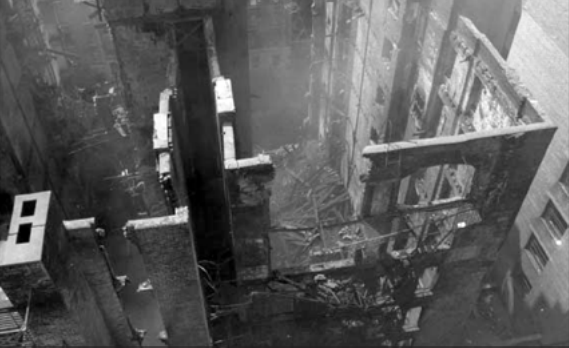
Clark Building after the fire

In the aftermath of the fire, many residents of the block were displaced. Forty of the co-op apartments at 111 Hicks Street and 60 Pineapple Street were extensively damaged. The remaining portion of the hotel on Henry Street survived serious destruction and reopened the day after the fire, but the Clark Building had to be demolished. Investigators found that a 61-year-old man had accidentally started the fire while ransacking the Clark Building for copper to steal and resell. Two months after the fire, city finance commissioner Joe Lhota indicated that the Drizins' portion of the complex could be sold to pay $764,000 in back taxes.

=== Post-fire ===
Sholom Drizin, a co-owner of the hotel portion of the building, unsuccessfully attempted to renovate the St. George into a luxury hotel after the fire. Educational Housing Services (EHS) began negotiating with the Drizins in May 1996 to lease most of the remaining hotel rooms, which were either vacant or occupied by elderly residents. EHS agreed the next month to lease 325 rooms as student dormitories, and the Drizins immediately began renovating the hotel. The dormitories had opened by 1997, and EHS operated nearly 800 dorm rooms at the St. George by the late 1990s. In particular, Pace University and Baruch College students used the hotel during the 2000s. Pace leased 600 dormitory rooms at the St. George until 2010, when it announced plans to build its own dormitory.

Meanwhile, the site of the burned Clark Building remained vacant until May 2000, when the New York City Landmarks Preservation Commission (LPC) approved Moshe Drizin's plans for a 220-room hotel on the site. Because the site was part of the Brooklyn Heights Historic District, the new building was designed in a neo-Renaissance style, complementing the rest of the block. Construction began later that year, at which point the new hotel was to be finished in 2002. As construction progressed, residents of the St. George Tower and Grill co-op expressed concerns that the project was damaging their portion of the building. By 2003, Drizin had installed a stucco facade on the new structure; this prompted objections from preservationists, who said the Drizins had agreed to clad the structure in brick, limestone, and terracotta. The structure was completed in 2005 as the Clark Residence, a dormitory operated by EHS.

The facade of the St. George Tower was restored around 2020. The St. George Tower is a co-op owned and run by the St. George Tower and Grill Owners Corp. The 100 Henry Street entrance, also known as the "Weller Wing" of the St. George and previously the hotel main entrance, leads to the EHS dorms and also allows access to the EHS-owned "Studio Wing". EHS houses 1,200 domestic and international students. In 2025, a 52,000 square feet (4,800 m^{2}) wellness center opened in the St. George Tower. The marquee above the subway station entrance collapsed in August 2025, though no one was hurt.

== In media ==
Columbia Records (now Sony Classical) used the Grand Ballroom at the Hotel St. George as a venue for several famous recordings by Leonard Bernstein and the New York Philharmonic. Among them are Tchaikovsky's Romeo and Juliet Fantasy Overture (recorded on January 28, 1957), Stravinsky's The Rite of Spring (January 1958), and Gershwin's An American in Paris (December 1958) and Rhapsody in Blue (June 1959).

In the 1972 film The Godfather, the meeting between Luca Brasi and Virgil Sollozzo was filmed in the hotel's lobby bar.

In the 1990 book New York New York, the German television journalist Werner Baecker reported on the Sunday sexual events of UN diplomats in the steam sauna during the 1970s.
