= Brooklyn Heights =

Neighborhood in New York City

- Neighborhood of Brooklyn
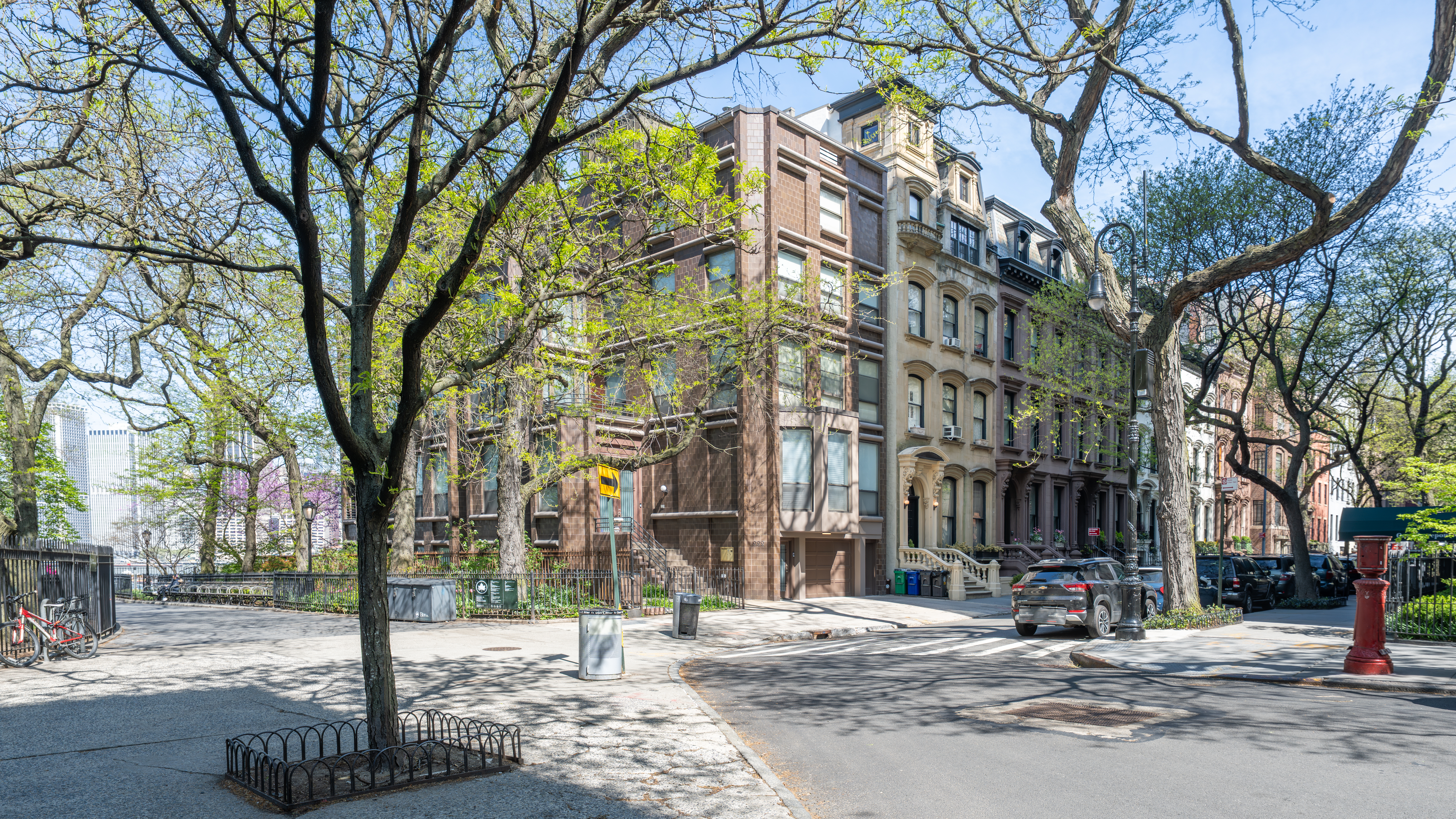
- Brooklyn Heights townhouses with a westward view toward the East River and Manhattan skyline
- Location in New York City
- Coordinates: 40.696°N 73.995°W
- Country: United States
- State: New York
- City: New York City
- Borough: Brooklyn
- Community District: Brooklyn 2
- Languages: List: 82.5% English; 3.6% Spanish; 2.8% French; 2.3% Chinese; 1.8% Korean; 1.6% Hebrew; 1.3% Hindi; 4.1% Other

Area
  - Total: 0.320 sq mi (0.83 km^{2})

Population (2020)
  - Total: 25,092
  - Density: 78,400/sq mi (30,300/km^{2})

Ethnicity
  - White: 75.2%
  - Asian: 8.8%
  - Hispanic: 7.3%
  - Black: 5.5%
  - Others: 3.1%

Economics
  - Median income: $119,999
- Time zone: UTC−05:00 (Eastern)
  - Summer (DST): UTC−04:00 (EDT)
- ZIP Code: 11201
- Area codes: 718, 347, 929, and 917
- Brooklyn Heights Historic District
- U.S. National Register of Historic Places
- U.S. National Historic Landmark District
- New York State Register of Historic Places
- New York City Landmark
- Location within New York City Location within New York Location within the United States
- Location: Bounded by Atlantic Ave., Court and Fulton Sts. and the BQE; Brooklyn, New York City
- Coordinates: 40°41′48″N 73°59′48″W
- Area: 140 acres (57 ha)
- Architect: multiple
- Architectural style: Greek Revival, Late Victorian, Gothic
- NRHP reference No.: 66000524

Significant dates
- Added to NRHP: October 15, 1966
- Designated NHLD: January 12, 1965
- Designated NYSRHP: June 23, 1980
- Designated NYCL: September 26, 1978

Brooklyn Heights is a residential neighborhood within the New York City borough of Brooklyn. The neighborhood is bounded by Old Fulton Street near the Brooklyn Bridge on the north, Cadman Plaza West on the east, Atlantic Avenue on the south, and the Brooklyn–Queens Expressway or the East River on the west. Adjacent neighborhoods are Dumbo to the north, Downtown Brooklyn to the east, and Cobble Hill and Boerum Hill to the south.

Originally referred to as Brooklyn Village, Brooklyn Heights was developed as a fashionable residential area after the introduction of ferry service to Manhattan in 1814. By the mid-19th century, the area was served by three ferry services as well as the Brooklyn and Jamaica Railroad, and it was one of New York's premier residential addresses. Some of its streets are named for early real estate developers. The neighborhood is noted for its low-rise architecture and its many brownstone rowhouses, most of them built prior to the Civil War. It also has an abundance of notable churches and other religious institutions. Brooklyn's first art gallery, the Brooklyn Arts Gallery, was opened in Brooklyn Heights in 1958. Much of the neighborhood is part of the Brooklyn Heights Historic District, a city-designated and National Historic Landmark District.

Directly across the East River from Manhattan and connected to it by subways and regular ferry service, Brooklyn Heights is also easily accessible from Downtown Brooklyn. Columbia Heights, an upscale six-block-long street next to the Brooklyn Heights Promenade, is sometimes considered to be its own neighborhood.

Brooklyn Heights is part of Brooklyn Community District 2, and its primary ZIP Code is 11201. It is patrolled by the 84th Precinct of the New York City Police Department. The New York City Fire Department operates two fire stations near Brooklyn Heights: Engine Company 205/Ladder Company 118 at 74 Middagh Street, and Engine Company 224 at 274 Hicks Street.

== History ==
=== Early settlement ===
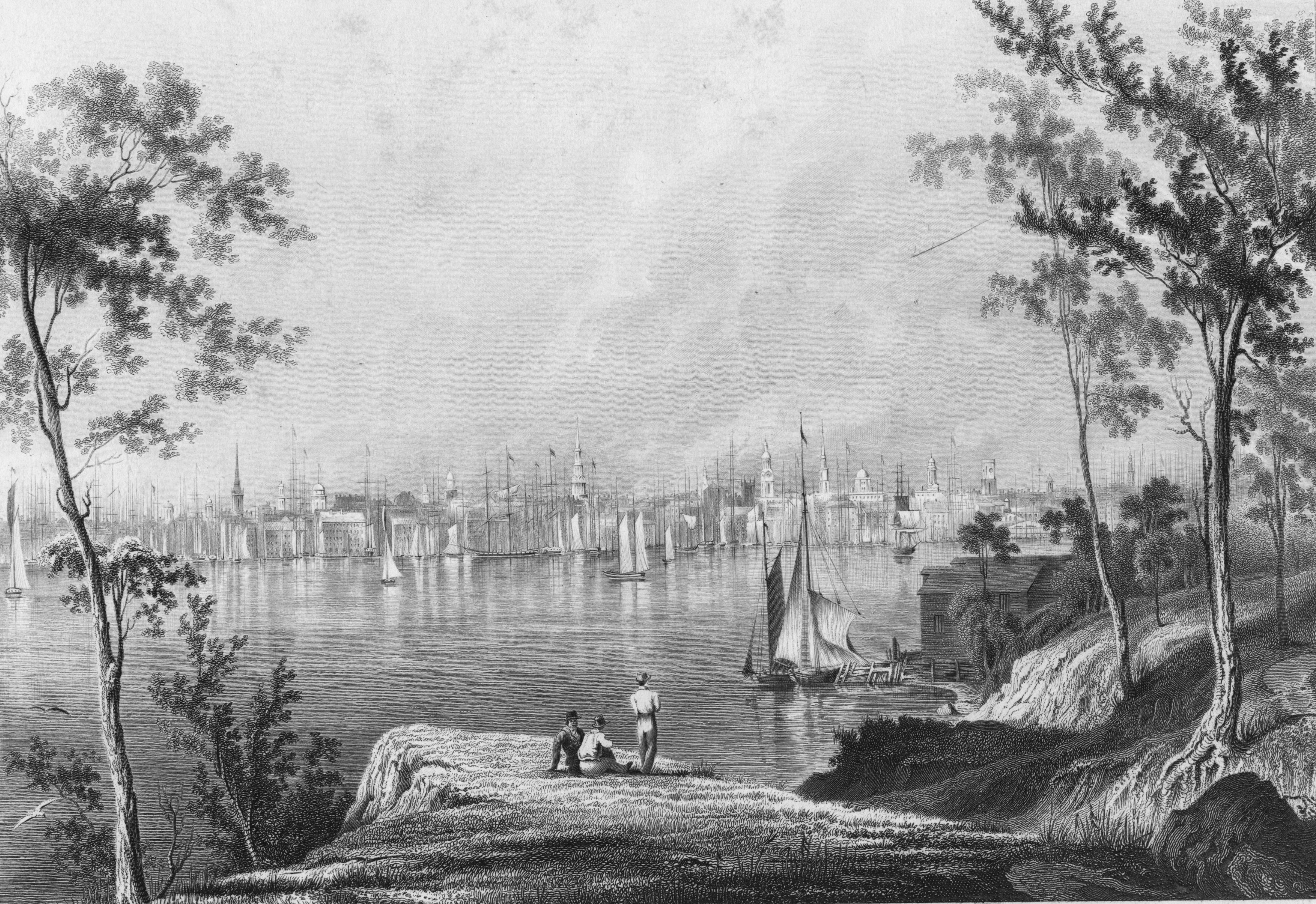
The view of New York City from Brooklyn Heights, (1778 – c. 1880)

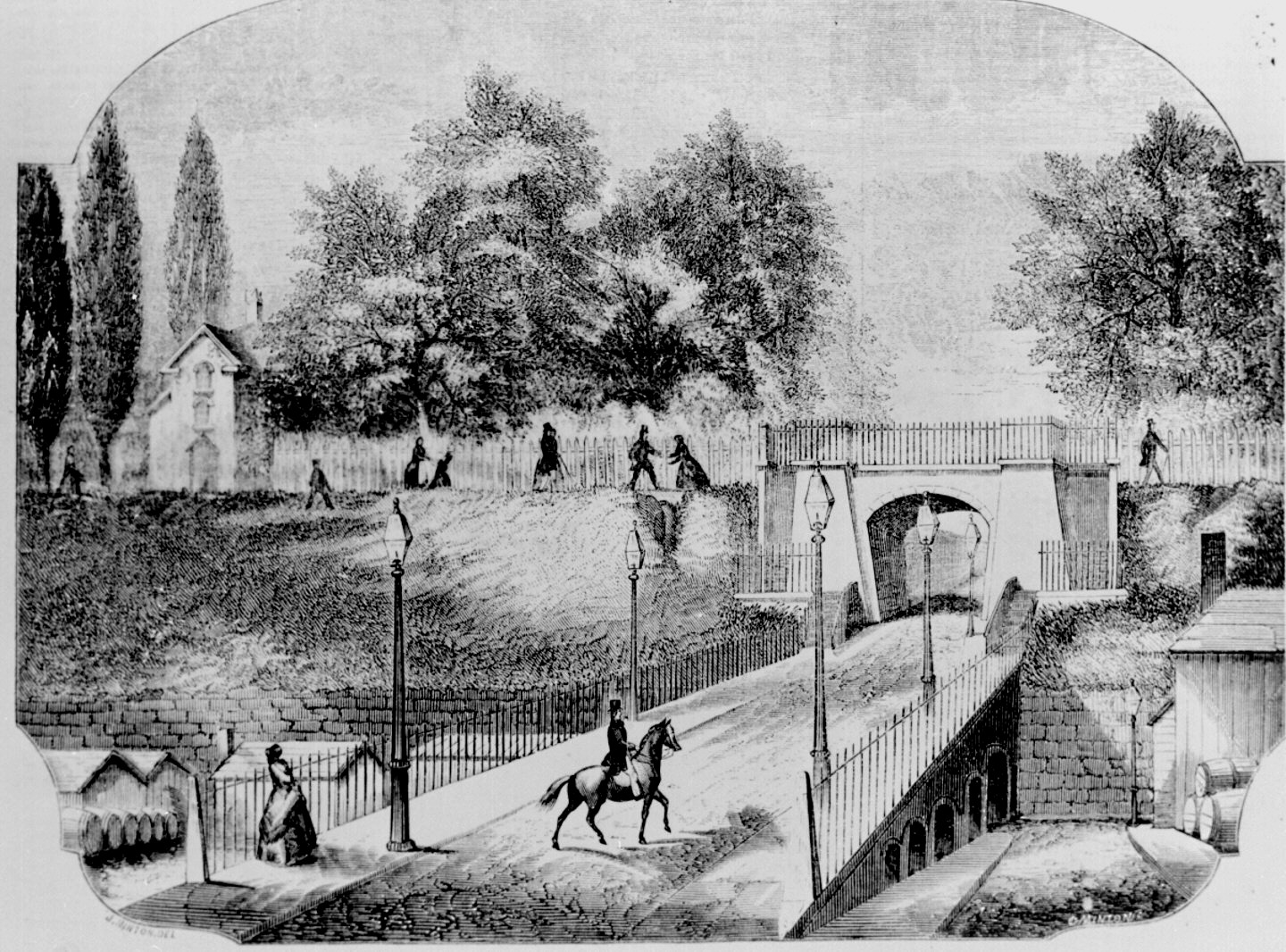
Brooklyn Heights in 1854

Brooklyn Heights occupies a plateau on a high bluff that rises sharply from the river's edge and gradually recedes on the landward side. Before the Dutch settled on Long Island in the middle of the seventeenth century, this promontory was called Ihpetonga ("the high sandy bank") by the native Lenape American Indians.

Ferries across the East River were running as early as 1642, serving the farms in the area. The most significant of the ferries went between the current Fulton Street and Peck Slip in Manhattan, and was run by Cornelius Dirksen. The ferry service helped the lowland area to thrive, with both farms and some factories along the water, but the higher ground was sparsely used.

The area was heavily fortified prior to the Battle of Long Island in the American Revolutionary War. After British troops landed on Long Island and advanced towards Continental Army lines, General George Washington withdrew his troops here after heavy losses, but was able to make a skillful retreat across the East River to Manhattan without the loss of any troops or his remaining supplies.

After the war, the 160-acre tract of land belonging to John Rapeljie, who was a Loyalist, was confiscated and sold to the Sands brothers, who tried to develop the part of the land on the palisade as a community they called "Olympia", but failed to make it come about, partly because of the difficulty of building there. They later sold part of their land to John Jackson, who created the Vinegar Hill community, much of which later became the Brooklyn Navy Yard.

=== Development ===
Brooklyn Heights began to develop once Robert Fulton's New York and Brooklyn Steam Ferry Boat Company began regularly scheduled steam ferry service in 1814, with the financial backing of Hezekiah Beers Pierrepont, one of the area's major landowners. Pierrepont had accumulated 60 acres of land, including 800 feet which directly overlooked the harbor, all of which he planned to sub-divide. Since his intention was to sell to merchants and bankers who lived in Manhattan, he needed easy access between Brooklyn Heights and New York City, which Fulton's company provided. Pierrepont bought 60 acres (24 ha) – part of the Livingston estate, plus the Benson, De Bevoise and Reemsen farms – on what was then called "Clover Hill", now Brooklyn Heights, and built a mansion there. Pierrepont purchased and expanded Philip Livingston's gin distillery on the East River at what is now Joralemon Street, where he produced Anchor Gin.

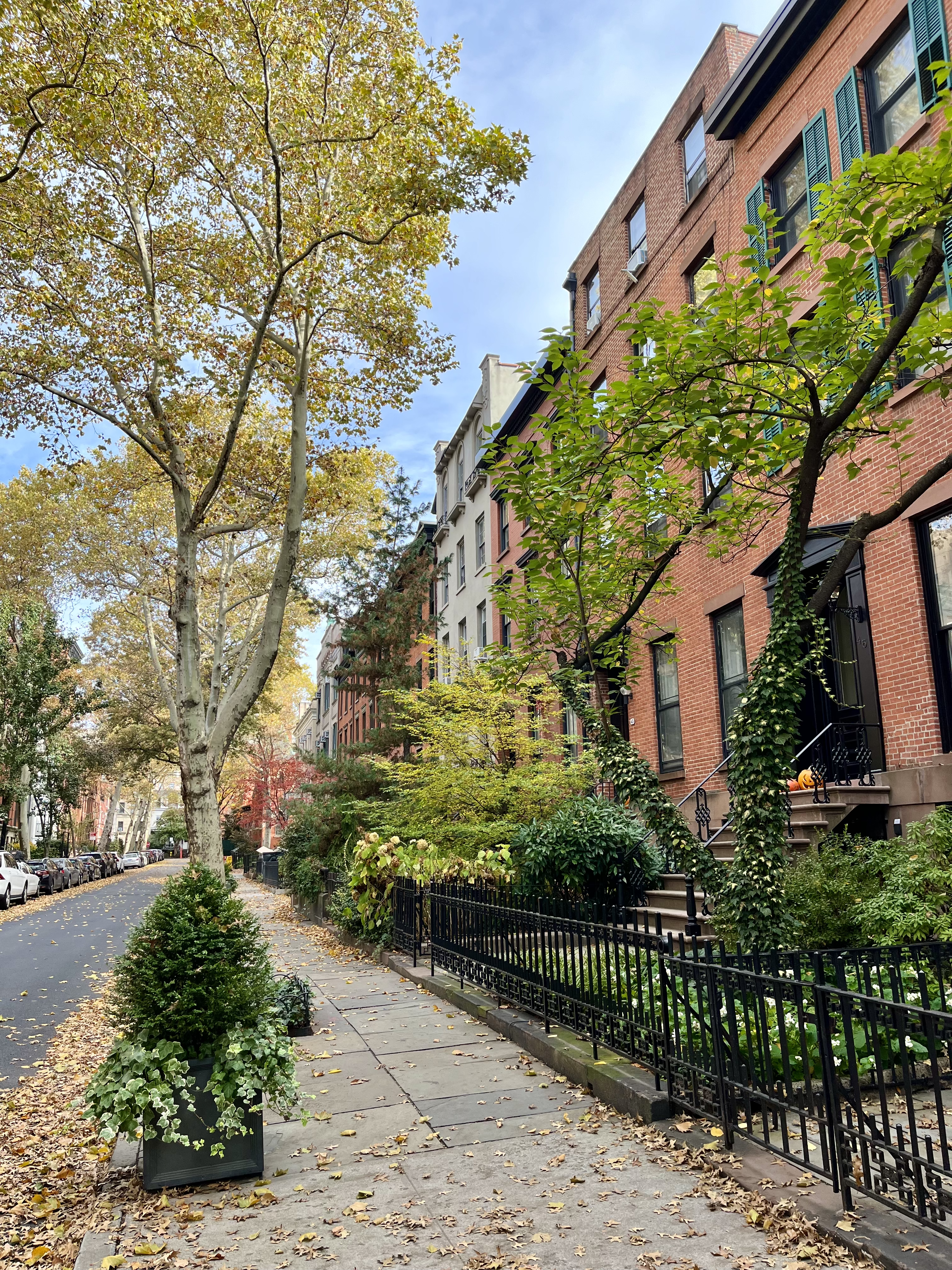
A street in Brooklyn Heights on an afternoon in fall 2022

Wishing to sub-divide and develop his property, Pierrepont realized the need for regularly scheduled ferry service across the East River, and to this end he became a prominent investor in Robert Fulton's New York and Brooklyn Steam Ferry Boat Company, using his influence on Fulton's behalf; he eventually became a part owner and a director of the company. Fulton's ferry began running in 1814, and Brooklyn received a charter as a village from the state of New York in 1816, thanks to the influence of Pierrepont and other prominent landowners. The city then prepared for the establishment of a street grid, although there were competing plans for the size of the lots. John and Jacob Hicks, who also owned property on Brooklyn Heights, north of Pierrepont's, favored smaller lots, as they were pitching their land to tradesman and artisans already living in Brooklyn, not attempting to lure merchants and bankers from Manhattan as Pierrepont was. To counter the Hickses' proposal, Pierrepont hired the surveyors Jeremiah Lott and Thomas Poppleton and submitted an alternative. In the end, the Hickses' plan was adopted north of Clark Street, and Pierrepont's plan south of it.

Thanks to the influence of Pierrepont and other landowners, Brooklyn received a charter from the state as a village in 1816, which led to streets being laid out in a regular grid pattern, sidewalks being laid, water pumps being installed and the institution of a watch. After 1823, farms begin to be sub-divided into 25-by-100-foot (7.6 by 30.5 m) lots, which were advertised as suitable for a "country retreat" for Manhattanites, leading to a building boom that resulted in Brooklyn Heights becoming the "first commuter suburb", since it was easier and faster to get to Manhattan by ferry than it was to commute from upper Manhattan by ground transportation. A resident of the Heights could leave the office at three o'clock, have dinner at home at four o'clock, and still have time for a "leisurely drive to the outskirts of town", a "middle class paradise". The community's development was helped by the yellow fever epidemic of 1822, when many of the rich from the city abandoned it for an area that was advertised as "elevated and perfectly healthy at all seasons ... a select neighborhood and circle of society."

Where there had been only seven houses in the Heights in 1807, by 1860 there were over six hundred of them, and by 1890 the area was almost completely developed. The buildings were designed in a wide variety of styles; development started in the northern part, and moved southward, so the architecture general changes in that direction as the preferred style of the time changed over the decades. Throughout the 19th century, Brooklyn Heights remained an elegant neighborhood, and became Brooklyn's cultural and financial center. Its development gave rise to offshoots such as Cobble Hill and, later, Carroll Gardens.

Prior to the Civil War, Brooklyn Heights was a locus of the Abolitionist movement, due to the speeches and activities of Henry Ward Beecher, the pastor of Plymouth Church, now the Plymouth Church of the Pilgrims. Beecher was a nationally known figure famous on the lecture circuit for his novel oratorical style, in which he employed humor, dialect, and slang. Under Beecher, so many slaves passed through Plymouth Church on their way to freedom in Canada that later generations have referred to the church as the "Grand Central Station of the Underground Railroad". To dramatize the plight of those held in captivity, Beecher once brought a female slave to the church and held an auction, with the highest bidder purchasing not the slave, but her freedom. Beecher also raised money to buy other slaves out of captivity, and shipped rifles to abolitionists in Kansas and Nebraska in crates labelled "Bibles", which gave the rifles the nickname "Beecher's Bibles".

=== 20th century ===
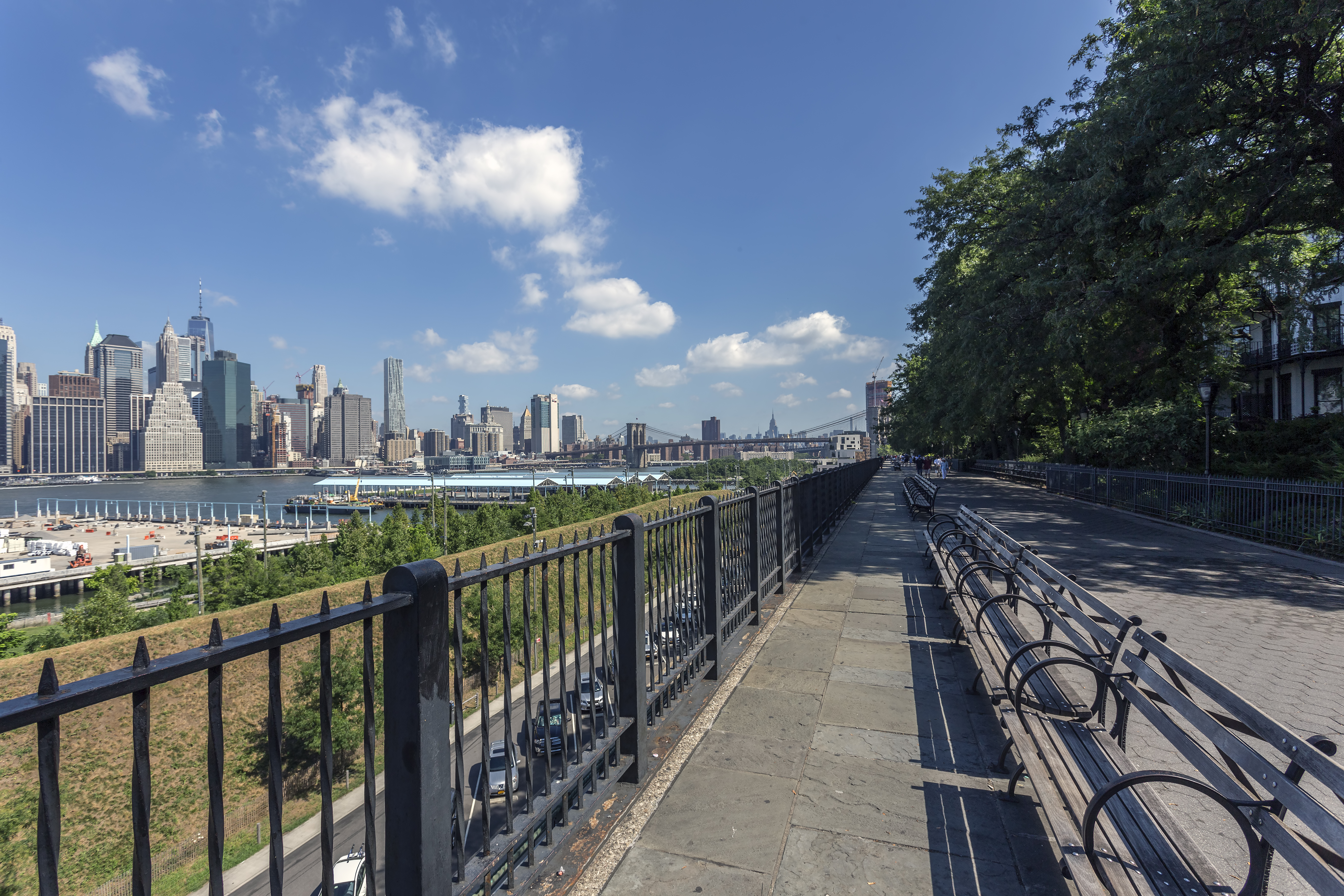
The Brooklyn Heights Promenade

The completion of the now historic Brooklyn Bridge in 1883, the Brooklyn end of which was near Brooklyn Heights' eastern boundary, began the process of making the neighborhood more accessible from places such as Manhattan. The Interborough Rapid Transit Company (IRT)'s Lexington Avenue subway line, which reached Brooklyn Heights in 1908, was an even more powerful catalyst in the neighborhood's development. The resulting ease of transportation into the neighborhood and the perceived loss of the specialness and "quality" began to drive out the merchants and patricians who lived there; in time their mansions were divided to become apartment houses and boarding houses. Artists began to move into the neighborhood, as well as writers, and a number of large hotels – the St. George (1885), the Margaret (1889), the Bossert (1909), Leverich Towers (1928), and the Pierrepont (1928), among others – were constructed. By the beginning of the Great Depression, most of the middle class had left the area. Boarding houses had become rooming houses, and the neighborhood began to have the appearance of a slum.

During the 1940s and 1950s, the building of the Brooklyn-Queens Expressway (BQE) negatively affected the neighborhood, as it took away the neighborhood's northwest corner and destroyed whole rows of brownstones. At about the same time, plans began to be developed by New York's "master builder", Robert Moses, wielding the Housing Act of 1949, to replace brownstone rowhouses – which were the typical building form in the neighborhood – with large luxury apartment buildings. A prominent example of the intended outcome is the Cadman Plaza development of housing cooperatives in the northern part of the neighborhood, located on the site where the Brooklyn Bridge trolley terminal once stood. In 1959, the North Heights Community Group was formed to oppose destroying cheap low-rise housing in order to build the high-rise Cadman Plaza towers. Architect Percival Goodman presented an alternate plan to maintain all sound structures, which garnered 25,000 supporters. In early 1961, a compromise proposal came from City Hall calling for two 22-story towers with over 1,200 luxury and middle income units. The Brooklyn Heights Association fully supported the compromise plan despite strong opposition from the preservation community, including the North Heights Community Group. As a result, 1,200 residents were removed from their houses and apartments in late 1961 and early 1962 as construction began on the modified plan.

One positive development came about when community groups – prominently the Brooklyn Heights Association, founded in 1910 – joined with Moses in the creation of the Brooklyn Heights Promenade, also called the Esplanade, which was cantilevered over the BQE. It became a favorite spot among locals, offering magnificent vistas of the Statue of Liberty, the Manhattan skyline across the East River, the Brooklyn Bridge, the Manhattan Bridge, and fireworks displays over the East River. Moses originally proposed to build the BQE through the heart of Brooklyn Heights. Opposition to this plan led to the re-routing of the expressway to the side of the bluff, allowing creation of the Promenade.

By the mid-1950s, a new generation of property owners had begun moving into the Heights, pioneering the "Brownstone Revival" by buying and renovating pre-Civil War period houses, which became part of the preservationist movement which culminated in the passage in 1965 of the Landmarks Preservation Law. In 1965, community groups which later became the Brooklyn Heights Association, succeeded in having the neighborhood designated the Brooklyn Heights Historic District by the New York City Landmarks Preservation Commission, the first such district in the city. This was followed in the following decades by the further gentrification of the neighborhood into a firmly middle-class area, which became "one of New York City's most pleasant and attractive neighborhoods."

=== 21st century ===
Starting in 2008, Brooklyn Bridge Park was built along the shoreline of the East River. As of 2018 the park was 90% complete, and it is now completely renovated. The Squibb Park Bridge was constructed in 2013 to provide access between the park and the rest of Brooklyn Heights, but had to be demolished in 2019 due to various structural issues. A replacement bridge opened in 2020. By the early 2020s, increasing numbers of celebrities were moving to the neighborhood.

== Architecture and places of interest ==
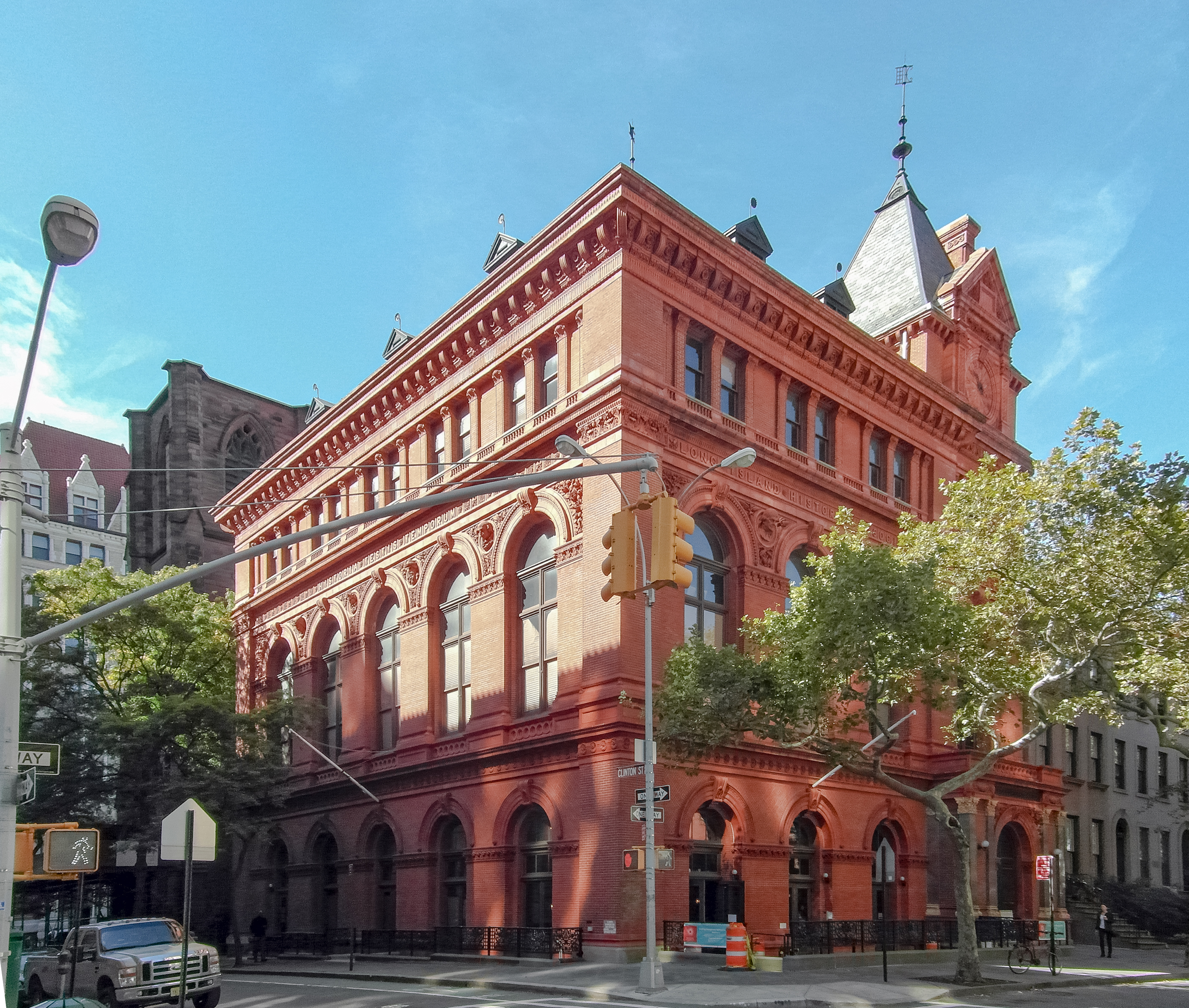
The Center for Brooklyn History (formerly the Brooklyn Historical Society), 128 Pierrepont Street on the corner of Clinton Street, founded by Henry Pierrepont in 1863 as the "Long Island Historical Society". The building was constructed in 1878–81 and was designed by George B. Post.

Brooklyn Heights is largely composed of blocks of picturesque rowhouses and a few mansions. A great range of architectural styles is represented, including Greek Revival, Italianate, Second Empire, Victorian Gothic, Romanesque, Neo-Grec, and Classical Revival, as well as a few 2/1/2-story late Federal houses from the early 19th century in the northern part of the neighborhood. Some houses were constructed of brick, but the dominant building material was brownstone or "Jersey freestone", a reddish-brown stone from Passaic County, New Jersey.

A typical brownstone rowhouse was three or four stories tall, with the main floor above the street level and reached by stairs, referred to as a "stoop", a word derived from Dutch. The basement is typically a half-flight down from the street, and was used as the work area for servants, including the kitchen. The first floor would be the location of the public rooms, bedrooms were on the second floor, and servants' quarters were on the top floor. The rear of the lot would feature a private garden. Aside from rowhouses, a number of houses, particularly along Pierrepont Street and Pierrepont Place, are authentic mansions.

The concentration of over 600 pre-Civil War houses, one of the largest ensembles of such housing in the nation, and the human scale of the three, four- and five-story buildings creates a neighborly atmosphere.

Brooklyn Heights has very few high-rise buildings. Among these buildings are 75 Livingston Street, Hotel St. George, Cadman Towers HDFC, Cadman Plaza North (Mitchell-Lama) and the Concord Village co-op development on Adams Street. Additionally, Jehovah's Witnesses had its world headquarters in the northern part of Brooklyn Heights at 25 Columbia Heights. The organization restored a number of historic buildings to house their staff, including the former Hotel Bossert, once the seasonal home of many Dodgers players, on Montague Street. In 2010, the organization announced plans to begin selling off its numerous properties in the Heights and nearby downtown Brooklyn, given that it plans to relocate itself in upstate New York.

The executive offices of the Brooklyn Dodgers were, for many years, located in the Heights, near the intersection of Montague and Court Streets. A plaque on the office building that replaced the Dodgers' old headquarters at 215 Montague Street identifies it as the site where Jackie Robinson signed his major league contract.

Plymouth Church of the Pilgrims and Our Lady of Lebanon Maronite Catholic Cathedral are located in Brooklyn Heights, as are the First Unitarian Congregational Society, the Long Island Historical Society, Packer Collegiate Institute, and St. Ann's and the Holy Trinity Church, among other historically notable buildings. Grace Episcopal Church, designed by Richard Upjohn, held its first service in 1848 and is the district as well. A number of bank buildings are concentrated on Montague Street, including the Brooklyn Trust Company Building, the People's Trust Building, and the National Title Guaranty Building.

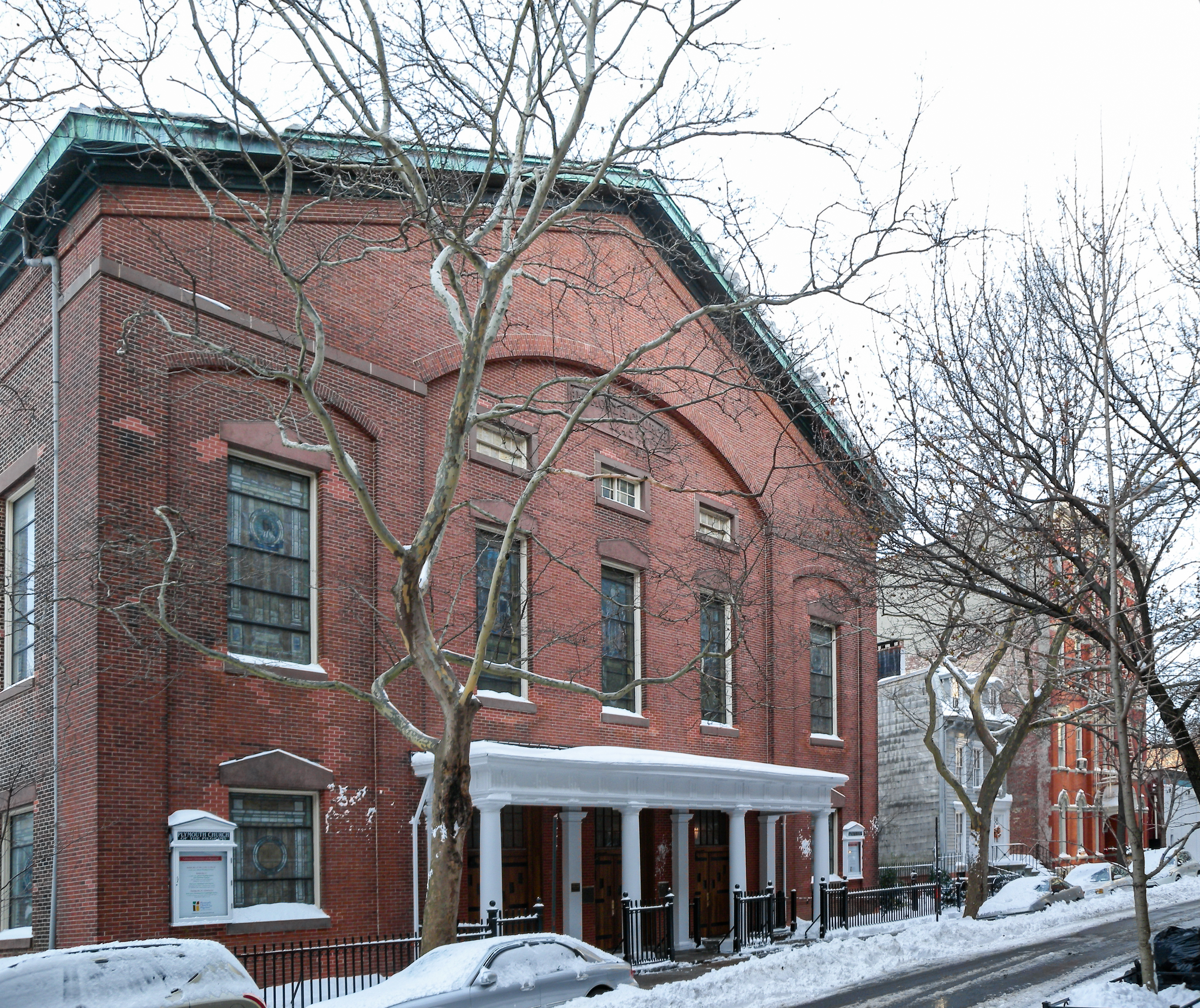
Plymouth Church (1849)

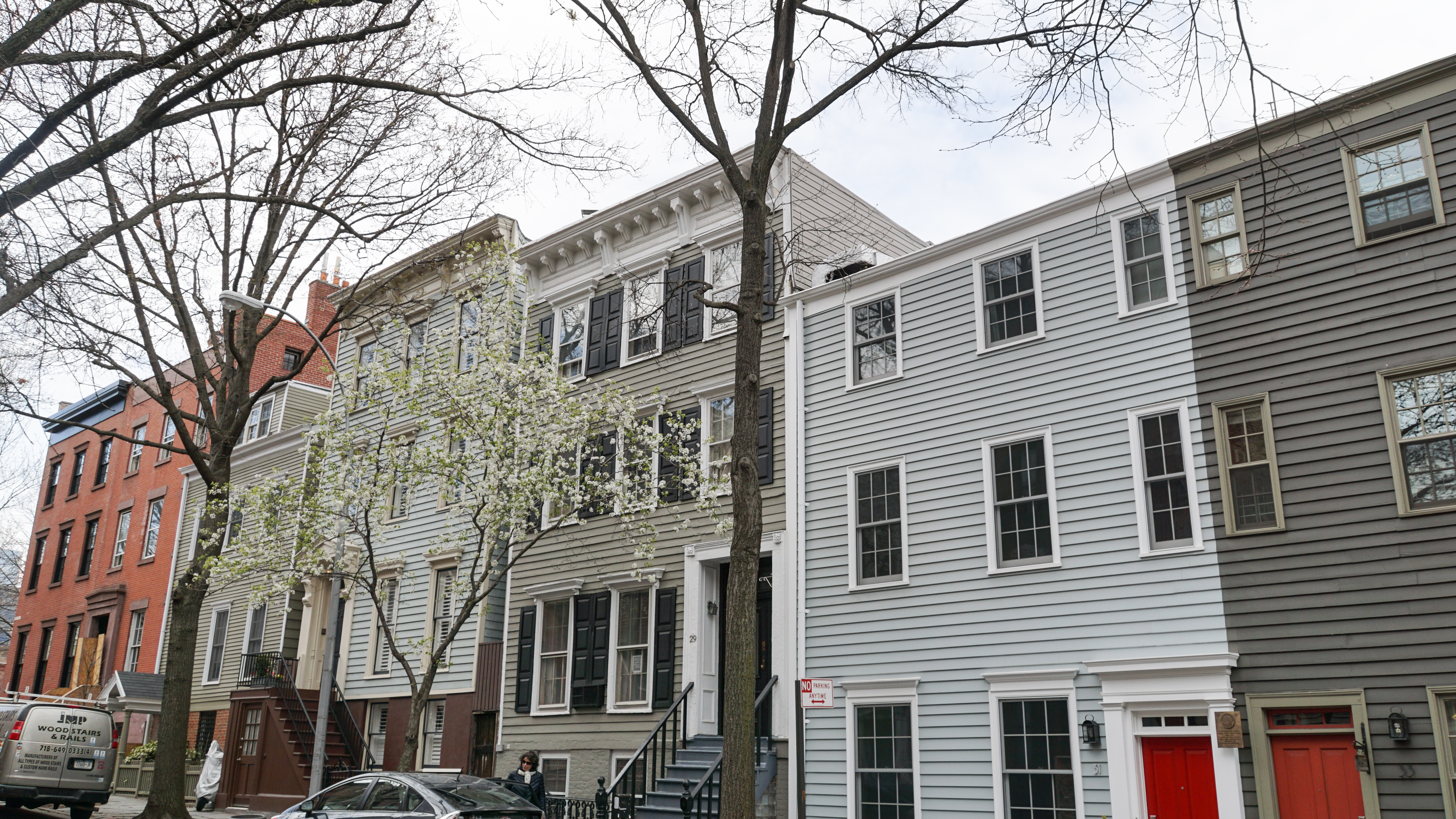
Wooden homes on Middagh Street

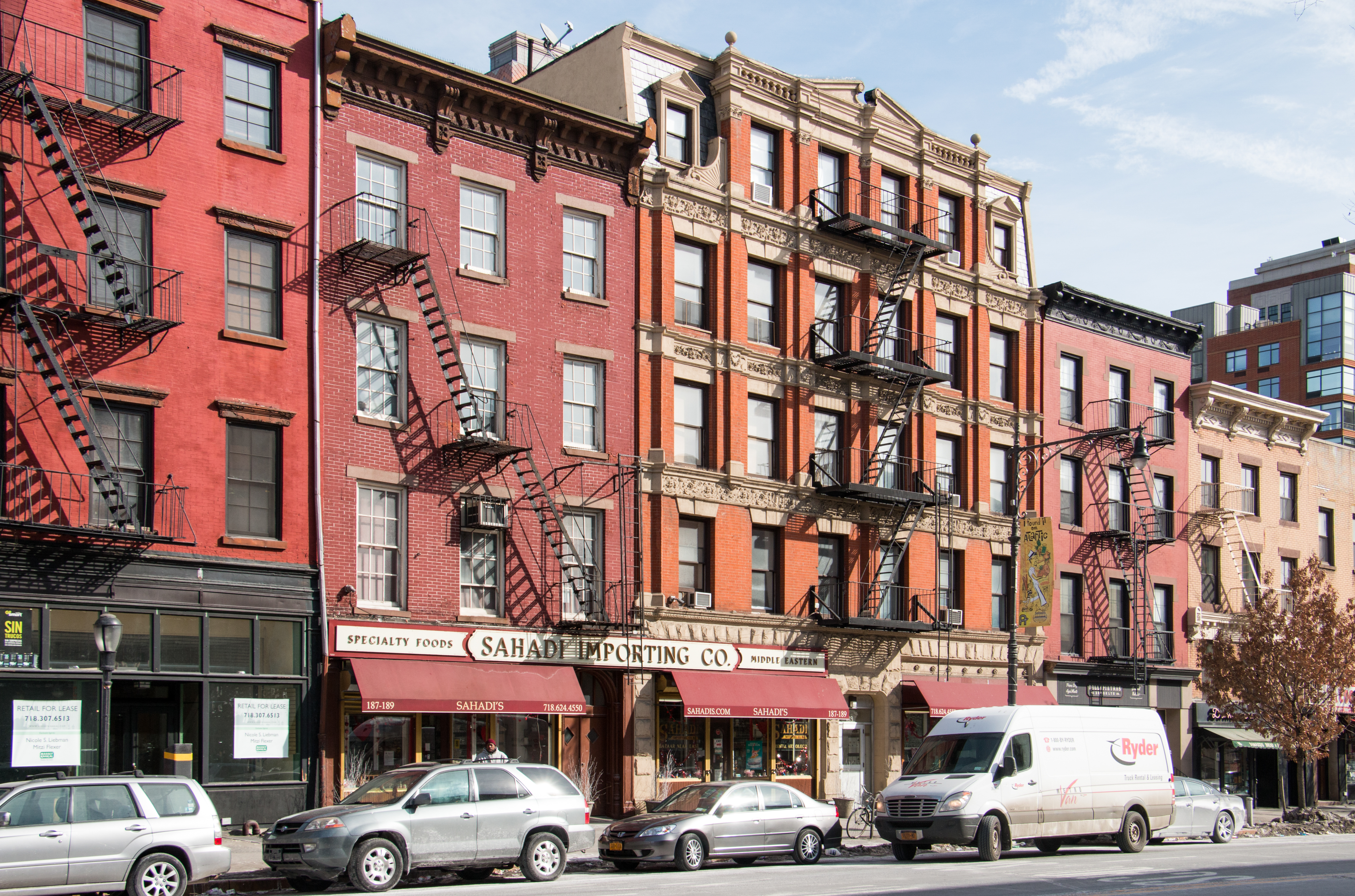
Atlantic Avenue

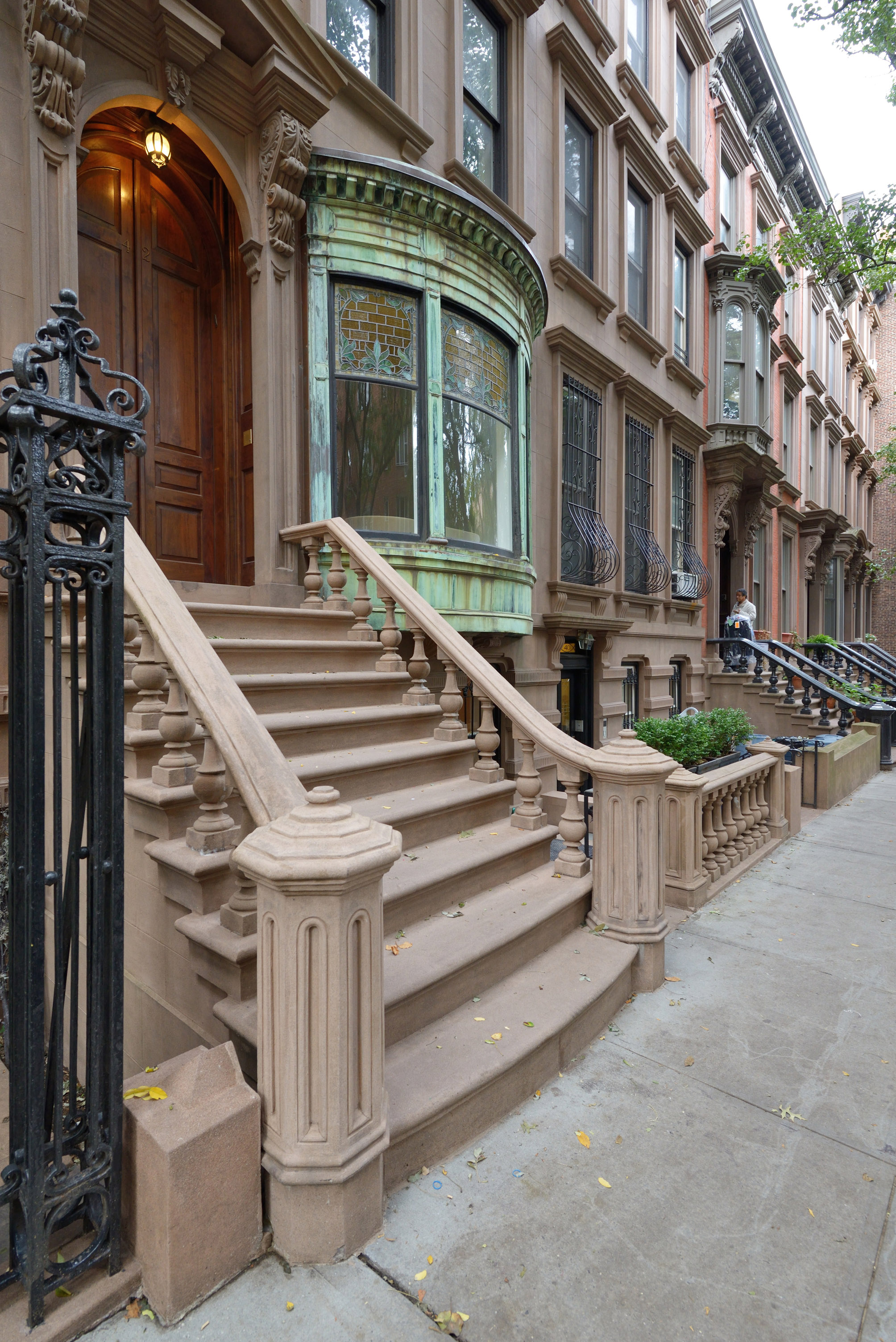
Townhouses on Grace Court

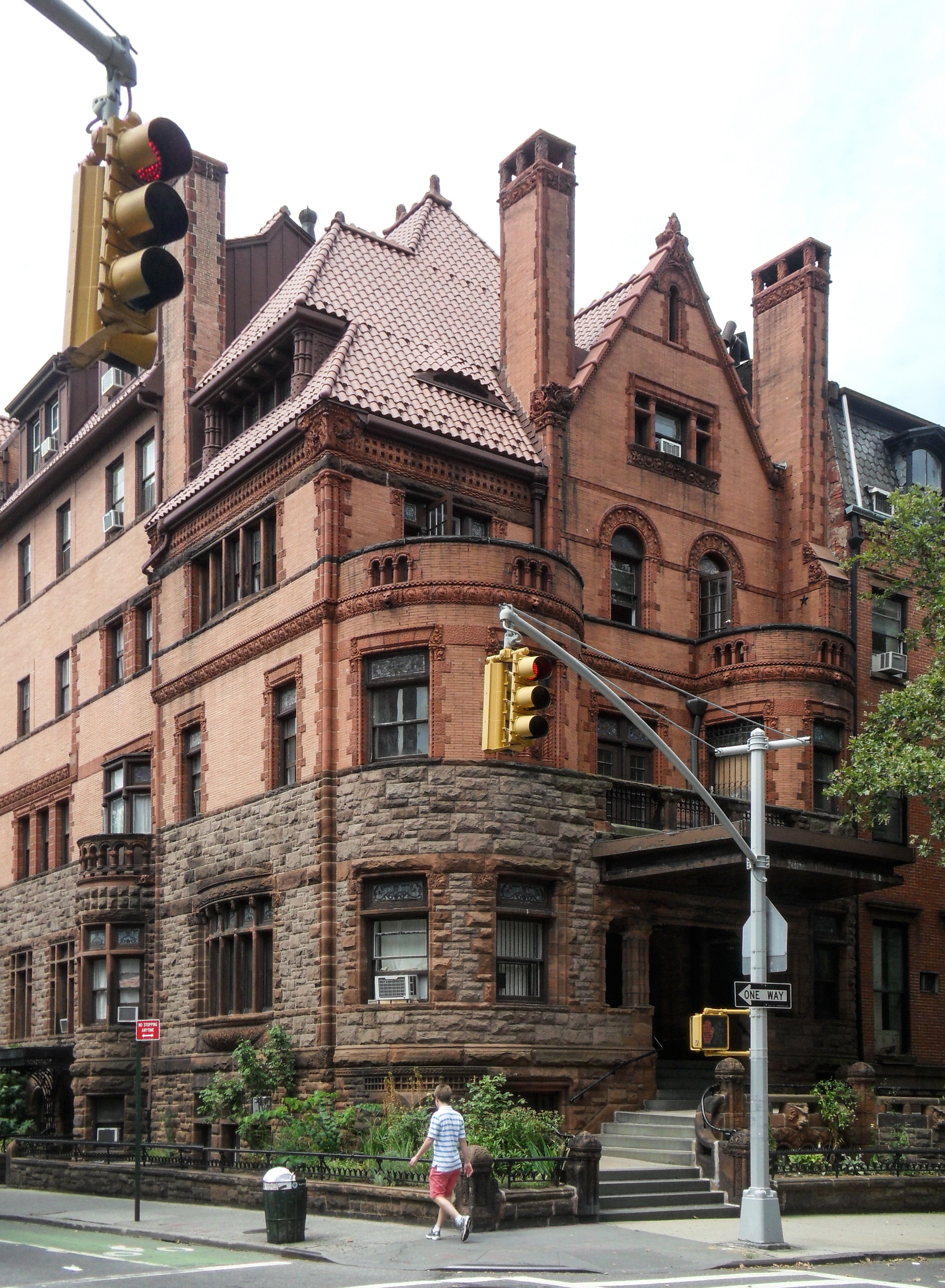
The Herman Behr Mansion (1888)

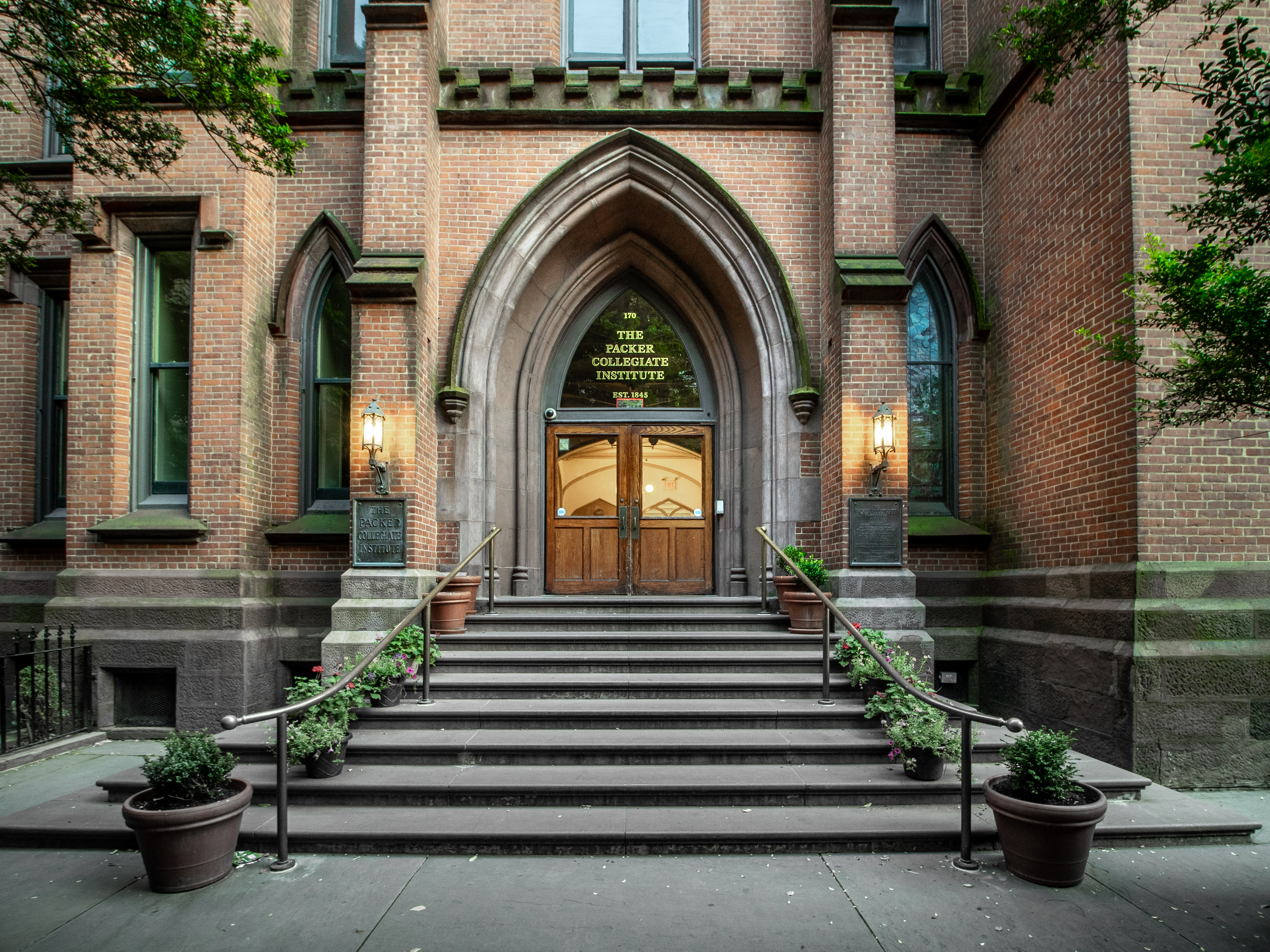
The steps of the Packer Collegiate Institute

=== Historic district ===
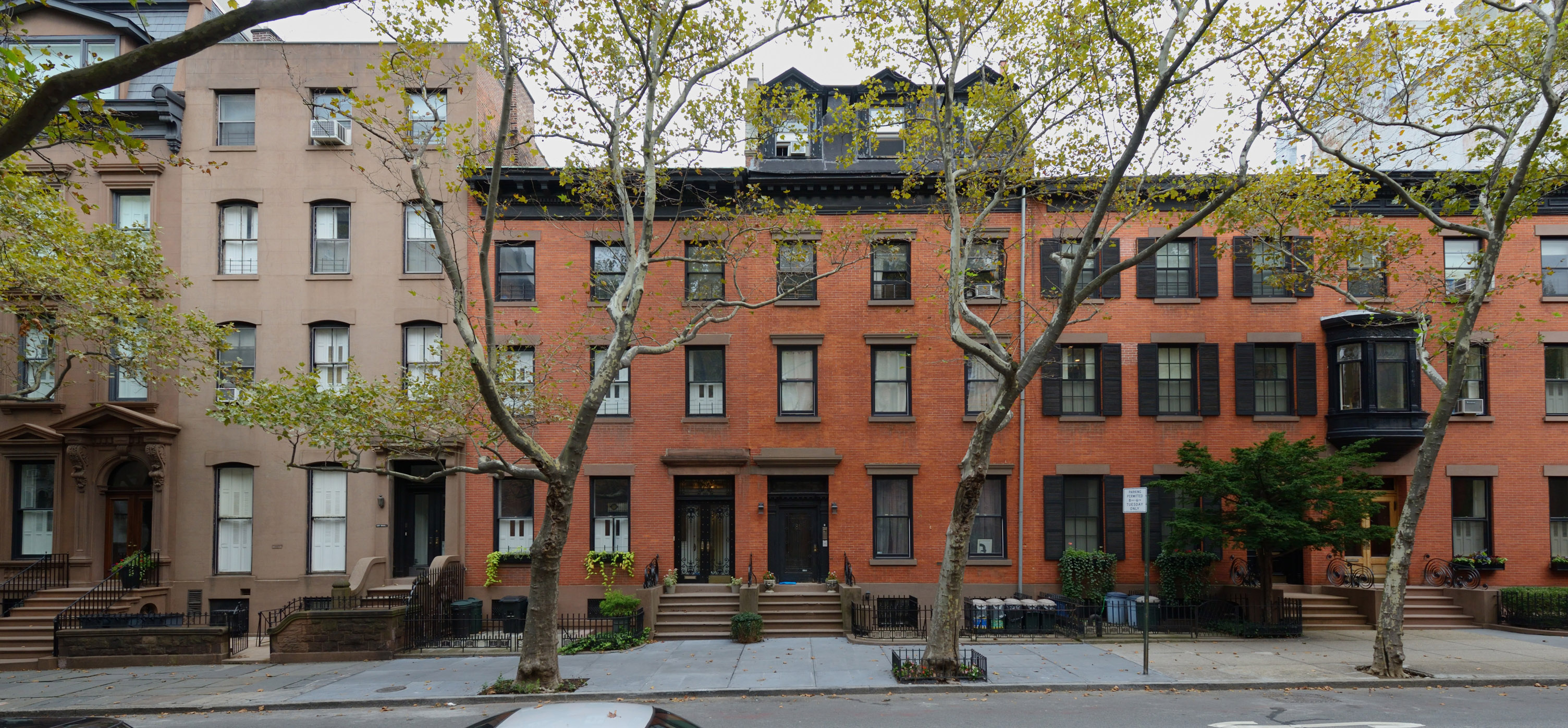
Representative rowhouses in the district

Much of the neighborhood is part of the Brooklyn Heights Historic District, a city and national historic district. It was named a National Historic Landmark District in January 1965, designated a New York City Landmark in November 1965, and added to the National Register of Historic Places in October 1966.

The district is bounded by Cadman Plaza West (Old Fulton Street) on the north, the Brooklyn-Queens Expressway on the west, Atlantic Avenue on the south, and an irregular line that partly follows Clinton and Henry Streets on the east. It is of national significance as an early commuter suburb, and as a well-preserved 19th-century urban streetscape.

== Demographics ==
Historical population
Year	Pop.	±%
2000	22,548	—
2010	22,887	+1.5%
2020	25,092	+9.6%

Based on data from the 2010 United States census, the population of Brooklyn Heights was 22,887, a change of 339 (1.5%) from the 22,548 counted in 2000. Covering an area of 235.86 acres (95.45 ha), the neighborhood had a population density of 97 inhabitants per acre (62,000/sq mi; 24,000/km^{2}). The racial makeup of the neighborhood was 75.2% (17,210) White, 5.5% (1,259) African American, 0.2% (37) Native American, 8.8% (2,003) Asian, 0% (3) Pacific Islander, 0.4% (82) from other races, and 2.7% (618) from two or more races. Hispanic or Latino of any race were 7.3% (1,675) of the population.

The entirety of Community Board 2, which comprises Brooklyn Heights and Fort Greene, had 117,046 inhabitants as of NYC Health's 2018 Community Health Profile, with an average life expectancy of 80.6 years. This is slightly lower than the median life expectancy of 81.2 for all New York City neighborhoods. Most inhabitants are middle-aged adults and youth: 15% are between the ages of 0–17, 44% between 25 and 44, and 20% between 45 and 64. The ratio of college-aged and elderly residents was lower, at 9% and 12% respectively.

As of 2016, the median household income in Community Board 2 was $56,599. In 2018, an estimated 22% of Brooklyn Heights and Fort Greene residents lived in poverty, compared to 21% in all of Brooklyn and 20% in all of New York City. One in twelve residents (8%) were unemployed, compared to 9% in the rest of both Brooklyn and New York City. Rent burden, or the percentage of residents who have difficulty paying their rent, is 39% in Brooklyn Heights and Fort Greene, lower than the citywide and boroughwide rates of 52% and 51% respectively. Based on this calculation, as of 2018, Brooklyn Heights and Fort Greene are considered to be high-income relative to the rest of the city and not gentrifying.

== Police and crime ==
Brooklyn Heights is patrolled by the 84th Precinct of the NYPD, located at 301 Gold Street. The 84th Precinct ranked 60th-safest out of 69 patrol areas for per-capita crime in 2010. This was attributed to a high rate of property crimes in the neighborhood. As of 2018, with a non-fatal assault rate of 40 per 100,000 people, Brooklyn Heights and Fort Greene's rate of violent crimes per capita is less than that of the city as a whole. The incarceration rate of 401 per 100,000 people is lower than that of the city as a whole.

The 84th Precinct has a lower crime rate than in the 1990s, with crimes across all categories having decreased by 82.3% between 1990 and 2018. The precinct reported 2 murders, 18 rapes, 147 robberies, 184 felony assaults, 126 burglaries, 650 grand larcenies, and 31 grand larcenies auto in 2018.

== Fire safety ==
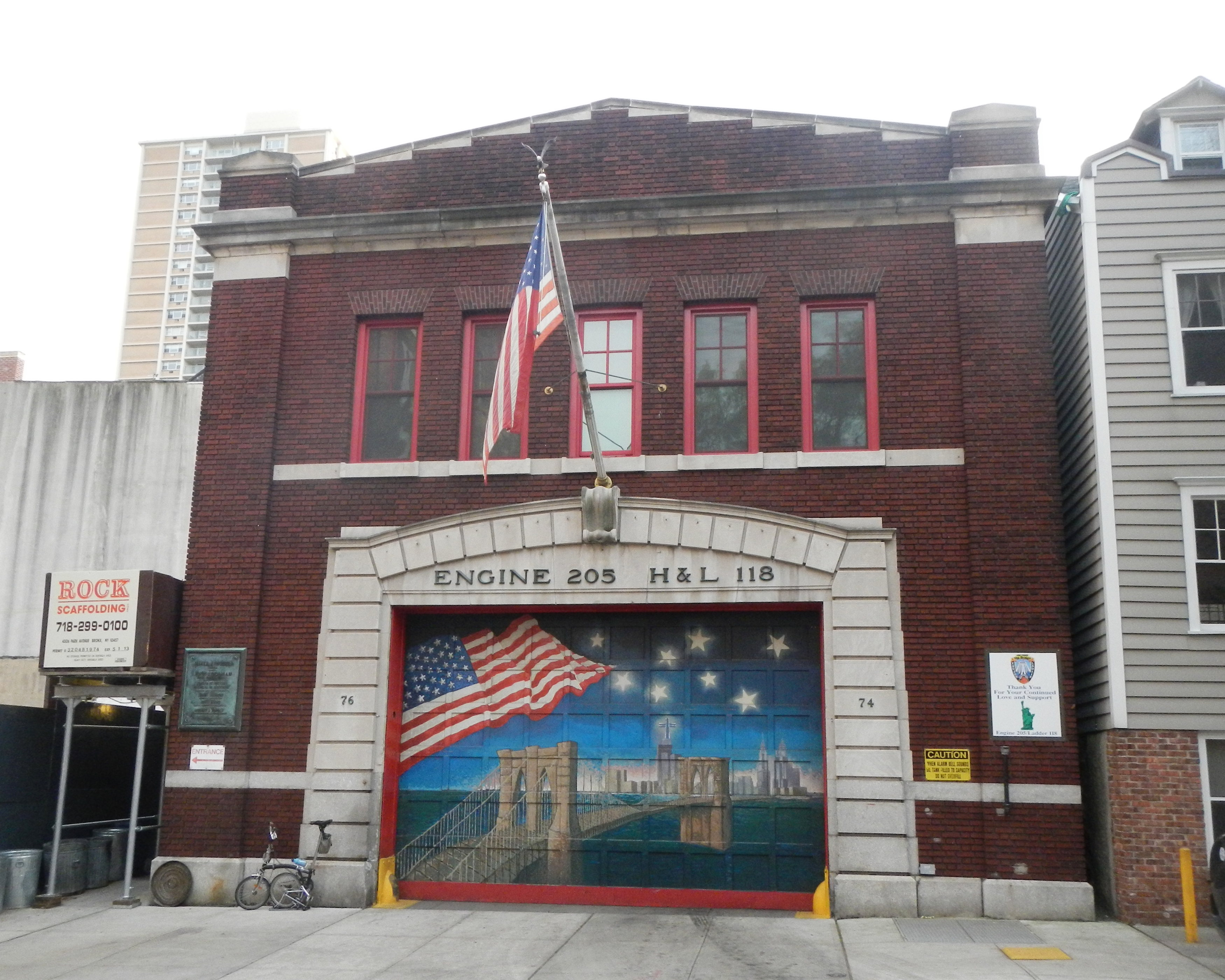
The firehouse for FDNY Engine Co. 205/Ladder Co. 118. This mural is based on the last known photograph of Ladder 118, as their firetruck crossed the Brooklyn Bridge for what proved to be the last time on September 11, 2001.

Brooklyn Heights is served by two New York City Fire Department (FDNY) fire stations. Engine Co. 205/Ladder Co. 118 is located at 74 Middagh Street, serving the northern part of the neighborhood, while Engine Co. 224 is located at 274 Hicks Street, serving the southern part of the neighborhood.

A third fire station, Engine Co. 207/Ladder Co. 110/Satellite 6/Battalion 31/Division 11, is located at 172 Tillary Street in nearby Fort Greene.

== Health ==
As of 2018, preterm births and births to teenage mothers are less common in Brooklyn Heights and Fort Greene than in other places citywide. In Brooklyn Heights and Fort Greene, there were 74 preterm births per 1,000 live births (compared to 87 per 1,000 citywide), and 11.6 births to teenage mothers per 1,000 live births (compared to 19.3 per 1,000 citywide). Brooklyn Heights and Fort Greene have a relatively low population of residents who are uninsured, or who receive healthcare through Medicaid. In 2018, this population of uninsured residents was estimated to be 4%, which is lower than the citywide rate of 12%. However, this estimate was based on a small sample size.

The concentration of fine particulate matter, the deadliest type of air pollutant, in Brooklyn Heights and Fort Greene is 0.0088 milligrams per cubic metre (8.8×10^{−9} oz/ft^{3}), lower than the citywide and boroughwide averages. Eleven percent of Brooklyn Heights and Fort Greene residents are smokers, which is slightly lower than the city average of 14% of residents being smokers. In Brooklyn Heights and Fort Greene, 24% of residents are obese, 6% are diabetic, and 25% have high blood pressure—compared to the citywide averages of 24%, 11%, and 28% respectively. In addition, 14% of children are obese, compared to the citywide average of 20%.

Eighty-eight percent of residents eat some fruits and vegetables every day, which is slightly higher than the city's average of 87%. In 2018, 86% of residents described their health as "good", "very good", or "excellent", more than the city's average of 78%. For every supermarket in Brooklyn Heights and Fort Greene, there are 12 bodegas.

== Post offices and ZIP Code ==
Brooklyn Heights is covered by ZIP Code 11201. The United States Post Office operates two locations nearby: the Cadman Plaza Station at 271 Cadman Plaza East, and the DUMBO Automated Postal Center at 84 Front Street.

== Education ==
Brooklyn Heights and Fort Greene generally have a higher ratio of college-educated residents than the rest of the city as of 2018. The majority of residents (64%) have a college education or higher, while 11% have less than a high school education and 25% are high school graduates or have some college education. By contrast, 40% of Brooklynites and 38% of city residents have a college education or higher. The percentage of Brooklyn Heights and Fort Greene students excelling in math rose from 27 percent in 2000 to 50 percent in 2011, and reading achievement rose from 34% to 41% during the same time period.

Brooklyn Heights and Fort Greene's rate of elementary school student absenteeism is about equal to the rest of New York City. In Brooklyn Heights and Fort Greene, 20% of elementary school students missed twenty or more days per school year, the same as the citywide average. Additionally, 75% of high school students in Brooklyn Heights and Fort Greene graduate on time, equal to the citywide average.

=== Schools ===
St. Ann's School, a K–12 school, is located in the neighborhood, with the main campus at 129 Pierrepont Street. Packer Collegiate Institute, a K–12 school, has also been located in the neighborhood, at 170 Joralemon Street, since its 1845 founding.

Public School 8, also known as The Emily Warren Roebling School, is an Elementary school located on 37 Hicks Street. P.S.8 includes courses in Math, English Language Arts, Social Studies, and Science, and highly values the arts alongside the traditional classroom. The new P.S.8 building was completed in 1908, and previously was the location of the home of John Roebling (the engineer of the Brooklyn Bridge).

St. Francis College is located on Remsen Street and occupies half a city block. It was founded as St. Francis Academy in 1859 by the Franciscan Brothers and was originally located on Baltic Street. St. Francis College was the first private school in the Roman Catholic Diocese of Brooklyn. As of 2010, 2,000 full-time students and more than 400 part-time students from 80 countries attend the college. St. Francis College has been ranked by The New York Times as one of the more diverse colleges in the United States. The college has also been ranked by both Forbes magazine and U.S. News & World Report as one of the top baccalaureate colleges in the north.

Brooklyn Heights is also the location of Brooklyn Law School, founded in 1901.

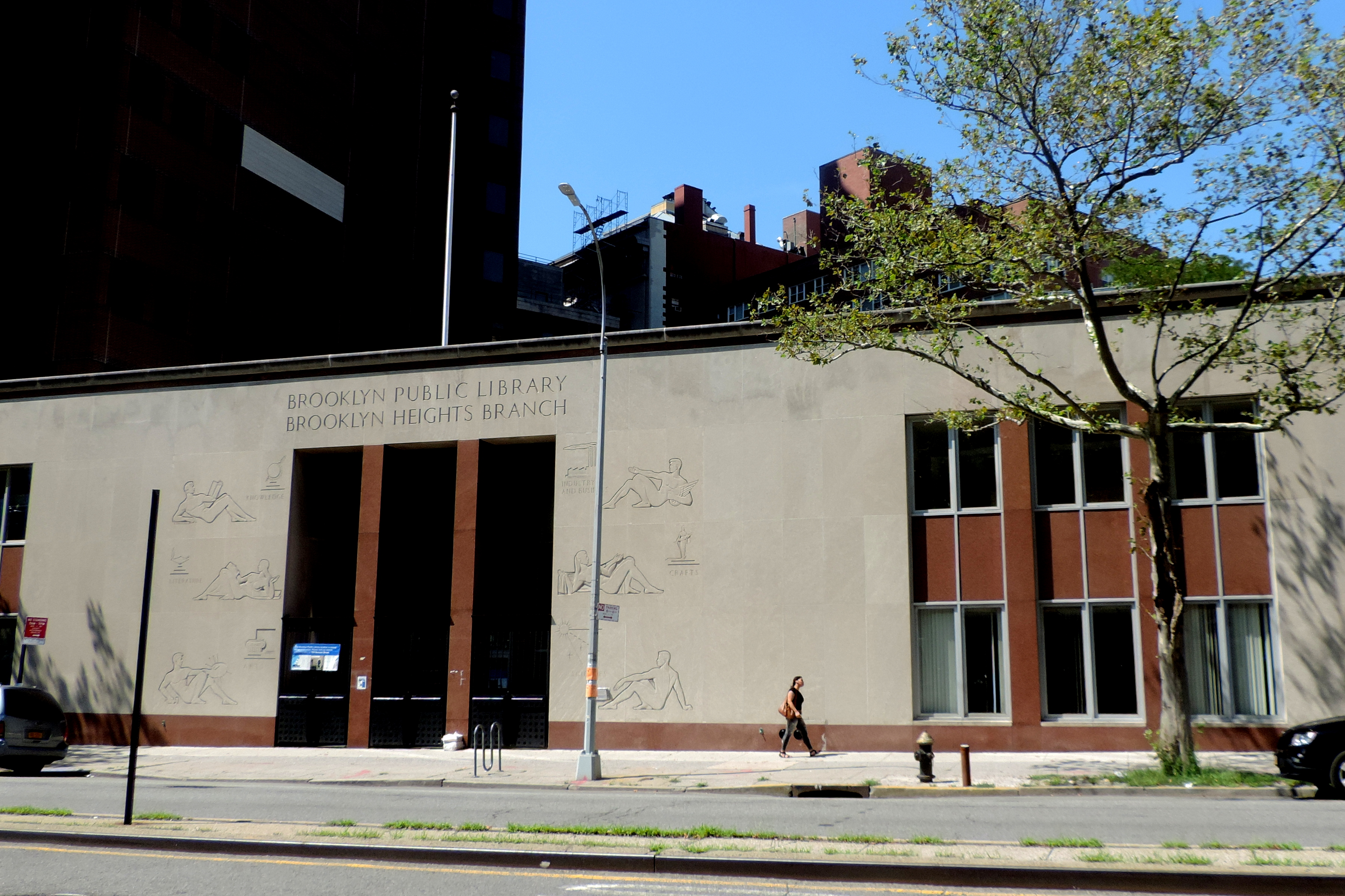
The former Brooklyn Public Library (BPL) Brooklyn Heights branch at 280 Cadman Plaza West, now demolished

=== Libraries ===
The Brooklyn Public Library (BPL)'s Brooklyn Heights branch is located at 286 Cadman Plaza West. The branch was formerly located at 280 Cadman Plaza West, which was shared with the Business & Career Library, but that site was sold to a developer and demolished.

Brooklyn Heights' first library was founded in 1857 by the Mercantile Library Association of the City of Brooklyn. The first BPL branch in the neighborhood, the Montague Street branch, was opened in 1903. The Brooklyn Heights branch building at 280 Cadman Plaza West opened in 1962 and originally contained an auditorium and children's room. It was renovated and expanded from 1990 to 1993, and upon the completion of the renovation, the Brooklyn Heights branch shared the site with the Business & Career Library. In 2013, BPL announced its intent to sell 280 Cadman Plaza West, and as part of this announcement, the Business and Career Library's functions were relocated to BPL's Central Branch. BPL then sold the Brooklyn Heights branch to developer Hudson Companies. Hudson Companies then demolished the structure and replaced it with a 34-story condominium, which now contains the smaller library at its base. In the interim, the BPL branch moved to the temporary 109 Remsen Street location, until the new location was completed in 2022.

== Transportation ==
Brooklyn Heights is serviced by numerous subway services, specifically the A and C trains at High Street; the A, C, F, <F>, N, R, and W trains at Jay Street–MetroTech; the 2 and 3 trains at Clark Street; and the 2, 3, 4, 5, N, R, and W trains at Borough Hall/Court Street.

Although no bus routes actually stop in Brooklyn Heights, many MTA Regional Bus Operations bus routes are located nearby in Downtown Brooklyn. The B25 also stops in Dumbo/Fulton Ferry, while the B61 and B63 serve Cobble Hill.

In June 2017, NYC Ferry's South Brooklyn route started stopping at Brooklyn Bridge Park Piers 1 and 6 in Brooklyn Heights.

The Montague Street Tunnel of the R train, opened in 1920, runs under the street, crosses under the East River and connects to the Whitehall Street station. From 1849, Montague Street used to run from on top of the cliff all the way down to the waterfront connecting to the Montague Street ferry that ended in 1912 and the street — and its access to the river — was truncated in 1946 when the Brooklyn Queens Expressway.

== Street names ==
Many of the streets in Brooklyn Heights are named after people who figured prominently in the neighborhood's history.

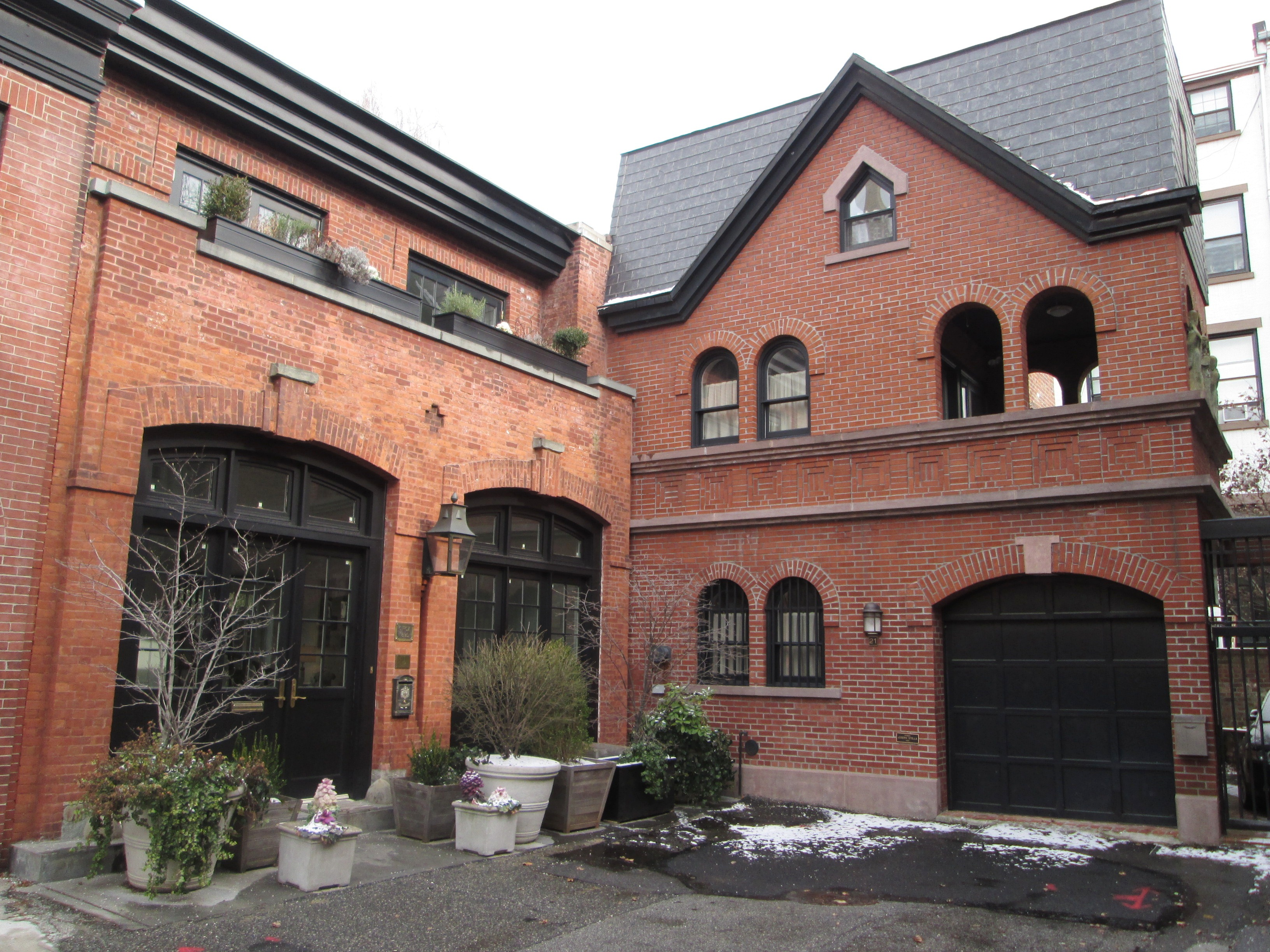
Grace Court Alley, a mews converted into residences

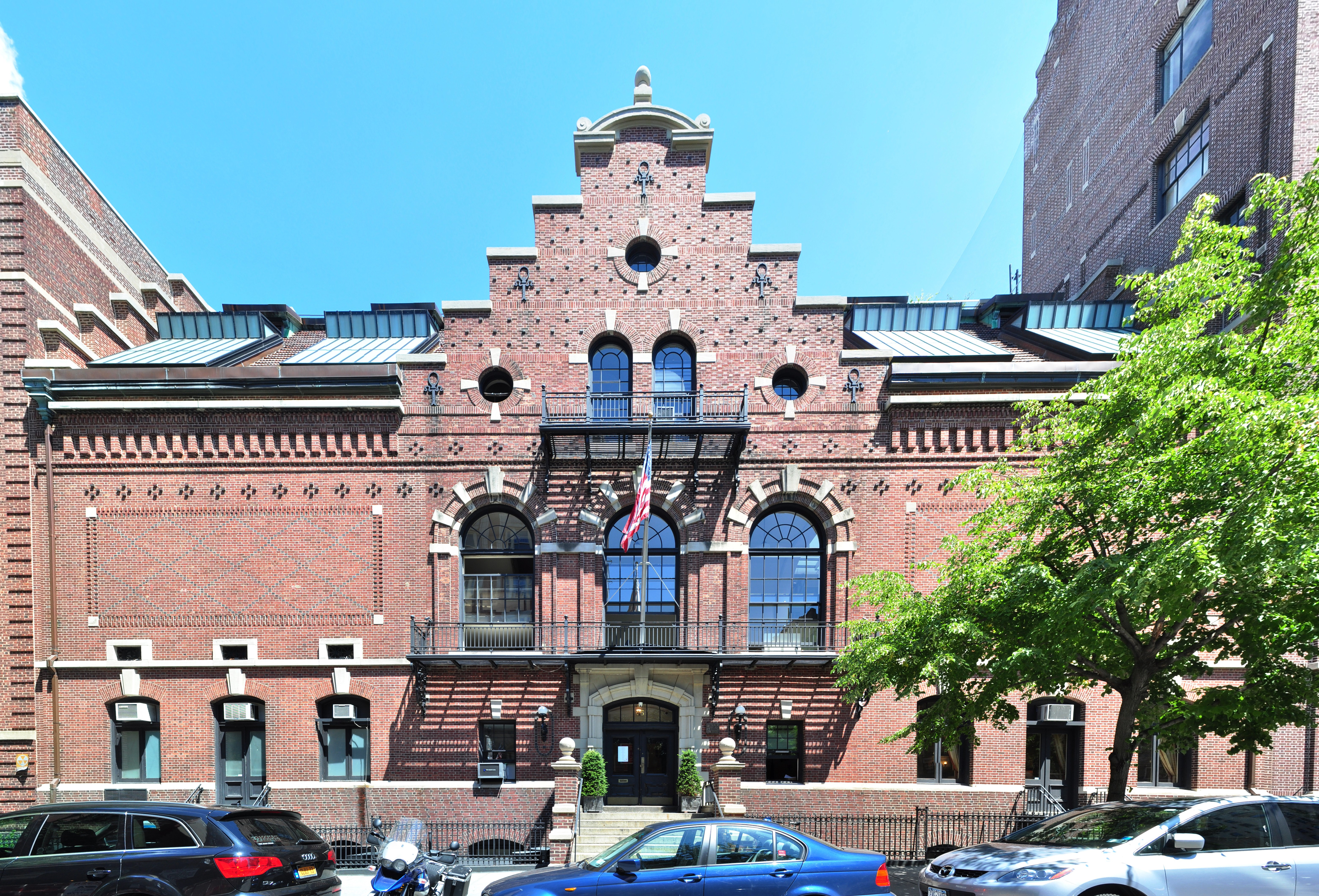
The Heights Casino at 75 Montague Street, built in 1905 and designed by Boring & Tilton. Next to it, where the club's former outdoor tennis courts stood, is the Casino Mansion Apartments (1910, William A. Boring)

- Adams Street – John Adams, second President of the United States; originally named "Congress Street"
- Aitken Place – Monsignor Ambrose Aitken of St. Charles Borromeo Roman Catholic Church
- Cadman Plaza – Samuel Parkes Cadman, pastor of the Central Congregational Church
- Clark Street – William Clark, ship's captain
- Clinton Street – DeWitt Clinton, mayor of New York City, governor of New York state, three time Presidential candidate
- College Place – named after the Brooklyn Collegiate Institute for Young Ladies (1829–1842); the building became the Mansion House Hotel in 1875
- Court Street – renamed from "George Street" in 1835, even though there were no courts nearby
- Doughty Street – Charles Doughty, 18th century lawyer, helped create the Village of Brooklyn
- Elizabeth Place – Elizabeth Cornell, built the first Pierrepont mansion
- Fulton Street, Old Fulton Street – Robert Fulton, introduced steam ferry service between Brooklyn Heights and Manhattan; Old Fulton Street was originally to have been named "Kings Highway", and Fulton Street was "Main Street"
- Furman Street – William Furman, state legislator
- Garden Place – originally part of Philip Livingston's garden
- Grace Court, Grace Court Alley – named after Grace Church
- Henry Street – Dr. Thomas Henry, president of the Kings County Medical Society
- Hicks Street – John and Jacob Hicks, 17th century ferry operators
- Hunts Lane – John Hunt, early purchaser of land from Hezekiah Pierrepont
- Joralemon Street – Teunis Joralemon, saddle maker
- Livingston Street – Philip Livingston, the only signer of the Declaration of Independence who was from Brooklyn
- Middagh Street – the Middaghs, a pre-Revolutionary War family
- Monroe Place – James Monroe, fifth President of the United States; the widest street in Brooklyn Heights
- Montague Street – Lady Mary Wortley Montagu, English feminist and activist for smallpox inoculation, a member of the Pierrepont family; originally named "Constable Street" after Anna Marie Constable Pierrepoint
- Pierrepont Street, Pierrepont Place – Hezekiah Pierrepont, the "founder" of Brooklyn Heights
- Remsen Street – Henry Remsen, son of Ram Jensen Vanderbeeck, a 17th-century blacksmith
- Schermerhorn Street – Peter and Andrew Schermerhorn, merchants and landowners
- Sidney Place – Sir Philip Sidney; originally "Monroe Place" until 1853
- Tillary Street – James Tillary, who worked on finding a cure for yellow fever

Concerning the "fruit streets" in Brooklyn Heights – Cranberry, Orange and Pineapple Streets – the WPA Guide to New York City reports that before the Civil War, these streets, along with Poplar and Willow Streets, were named after prominent families, but that a member of the Middagh family expressed her dislike of these families by replacing the street signs with botanical names. The city would restore the proper names, and Middagh would put back her own signs. Several iterations of this game ended when Middagh's new names were given official status by a resolution of the alderman. In Historically Speaking, Brooklyn borough historian John B. Manbeck says only that these street names "have questionable origins", as does Love Lane, which reputedly gets its name from the meetings that took place there between a pretty girl who lived nearby and her suitors.

== Notable people ==
There have been many noted residents of Brooklyn Heights. The dates listed are their respective birth and death dates. Famous residents include:

- W. H. Auden (1907–1973), poet, lived with Benjamin Britten and Carson McCullers at 7 Middagh Street
- Haley Bennett (born 1988), actress, singer and dancer
- Matthew Barney (born 1967), artist
- John R. Bartels (1897–1997), United States district judge of the United States District Court for the Eastern District of New York.
- Henry Ward Beecher (1813–1887), clergyman, social reformer and abolitionist
- Edet Belzberg, documentary filmmaker who won a 2005 MacArthur Fellowship.
- Paul Bettany (born 1971), actor
- Morton Birnbaum (1926–2005), lawyer and physician who advocated for the right of psychiatric patients to have adequate, humane care, and who coined the term sanism.
- Björk (born 1965), musician
- Alexis Bledel (born 1981), actress
- Emily Blunt (born 1983), actress.
- Lee Breuer (1937–2021), playwright and theater director
- Benjamin Britten (1913–1976), composer, lived with W. H. Auden and Carson McCullers at 7 Middagh Street
- Joseph Brodsky (1940–1996), Nobel Prize winner and U.S. Poet Laureate
- Gabriel Byrne (born 1950), actor
- Truman Capote (1924–1984), author, lived at 70 Willow Street
- Ron Chernow (born 1949), Pulitzer prize-winning author and historian
- Peggy Clark (1915–1996), lighting designer, costume designer and set designer.
- Jennifer Connelly (born 1970), actress
- Barbara Cooney (1917–2000), writer and illustrator
- Hart Crane (1899–1932), poet
- Scott Crary (born 1978), director and producer
- Matt Damon (born 1970), actor
- Adam Driver (born 1983), actor who appeared as Kylo Ren in the Star Wars sequel trilogy.
- W. E. B. Du Bois (1868–1963), sociologist, historian, civil rights activist, author and editor
- Lena Dunham (born 1986), actress, writer and director
- Bonnie Erickson (born 1941), designer of puppets, costumes, toys, and graphics, best known for her work with Jim Henson and The Muppets where her creations include Miss Piggy.
- William Everdell (born 1941), historian, author and teacher
- Tom Frieden, infectious disease and public health expert, who was director of the U.S. Centers for Disease Control and Prevention.
- Elizabeth Gaffney (born 1966), novelist
- Paul Giamatti (born 1967), actor
- Hetty Green (1834–1916), businesswoman known for both her wealth and her miserliness
- Lucas Hedges (born 1996), actor
- Peter Hedges (born 1962), novelist, playwright, screenwriter and film director
- Jack Holland (1947–2004), journalist, novelist and poet who chronicled "The Troubles" in his native Northern Ireland.
- Alice Recknagel Ireys (1911–2000), landscape architect.
- John Krasinski (born 1979), actor
- Clay Lancaster (1917–2000), authority on American architecture and an influential advocate of historical preservation.
- Utrice Leid (born c. 1953), journalist who was the managing editor of The City Sun and general manager of New York radio station WBAI
- Philip Levine (1928–2015), poet
- Joe Lhota (born 1954), public servant and a former politician, who served as the chairman of the Metropolitan Transportation Authority.
- Grace Denio Litchfield (1849–1944), poet and novelist
- Philip Livingston (1716–1778), lawyer, businessman, slave trader and one of New York's four signers of the United States Declaration of Independence.
- H. P. Lovecraft (1890–1937), short-story writer, editor, novelist and poet.
- James Lyons (1960–2007), film editor, screenwriter and actor who frequently collaborated with Todd Haynes.
- Norman Mailer (1923–2007), novelist.
- Norris Church Mailer (1949–2010), author who was the wife of Norman Mailer.
- Carson McCullers (1917–1967), writer, lived with W. H. Auden and Benjamin Britten at 7 Middagh Street
- Arthur Miller (1915–2005), playwright, essayist
- Henry Miller (1891–1980), author
- Lady Mary Wortley Montagu (1689–1762), a cousin of the Pierrepont family, best remembered for bringing the concept of inoculation against smallpox to the attention of the British public; Montague Street was named after her
- Mary Tyler Moore (1936–2017), actress
- Errol Morris (born 1948), film director
- Mary-Louise Parker (born 1964), actress and writer.
- Joseph Pennell (1857–1926), painter
- Suzanne Pleshette (1937–2008), actress and voice actress
- John Podhoretz (born 1961), commentator
- Ernest Poole (1880–1950), novelist
- James Purdy (1914–2009), novelist, short-story writer, poet and playwright.
- Marky Ramone (born 1952), former drummer of punk rock band the Ramones.
- John A. Roebling II (1867–1952), engineer and philanthropist
- Theodore Roosevelt IV (born 1942), investment banker and managing director at Barclays Investment Bank
- Keri Russell (born 1976), actress
- Amy Ryan (born 1968), actress who appeared in The Office
- Mia Sara (born 1967), actress who appeared in Ferris Bueller's Day Off
- Amy Schumer (born 1981), comedian and actress
- Louis Sheaffer (1912–1993), journalist and author who was awarded the 1974 Pulitzer Prize for Biography or Autobiography for his biography of Eugene O'Neill.
- Oliver Smith (1918–1984), stage designer, owned 60 Willow Street
- Dan Stevens (born 1982), actor
- William C. Thompson (1924–2018), New York State Senator and Justice of the New York Supreme Court, Appellate Division
- Sigrid Undset (1882–1949), Norwegian author who resided in the U.S. in exile during World War II
- John Utendahl (born 1962), owner of the Utendahl Group, one of the largest African American-owned investment banking groups in the United States
- Andrew VanWyngarden (born 1983), musician, MGMT
- Walt Whitman (1819–1892), poet and editor of the Brooklyn Daily Eagle
- Bill W. (1895–1971 as William Griffith Wilson), co-founded Alcoholics Anonymous in a town house at 182 Clinton Street.
- Michelle Williams (born 1980), actress
- Thomas Wolfe (1900–1938), novelist
- David Yassky (born 1964), Dean Emeritus of Pace University School of Law
- Adam Yauch (1964–2012), founding member of the Beastie Boys
- Thaddeus Young (born 1988), power forward for the Indiana Pacers.
- Louis Zukofsky (1904–1978), poet

== In popular culture ==
- The 1960s TV show The Patty Duke Show was set at 8 Remsen Street, Brooklyn Heights, and the neighborhood received a name check in the theme song, in which "Patty's only seen the sights a girl can see from Brooklyn Heights."
- The 1975 movie Three Days of the Condor, directed by Sydney Pollack and starring Robert Redford and Faye Dunaway, had the fictional residence of Dunaway's character located at 9 Cranberry Street in Brooklyn Heights.
- The 1977 horror film The Sentinel featured exterior shots along the Promenade, most notably of the southernmost building at 13 Remsen Street. The neighborhood is a popular destination for many TV and film producers, and has been used both for interior and exterior shoots in projects that included Boardwalk Empire, St. James Place, White Collar, and Hostages.
- The area was also the main setting of The Cosby Show (1984–1992) where the Huxtable family resided in a two-story brownstone at 10 Stigwood Avenue, a fictional address in Brooklyn Heights.
- The 1987 romantic comedy film Moonstruck, starring Cher and Nicolas Cage, is set in the neighborhood.
- Canadian drag queen Brooke Lynn Hytes's name comes from the neighborhood. He was a runner-up on the eleventh season of RuPaul's Drag Race.

== See also ==
- List of New York City Designated Landmarks in Brooklyn
- List of National Historic Landmarks in New York City
- National Register of Historic Places listings in Brooklyn
- History of Brooklyn
- Fort Brooklyn
