= List of Long Island University people =

Below are alumni, benefactors, presidents or chancellors, and other notable people associated with Long Island University, a private university with campuses in Brooklyn and Brookville, New York, United States.

== Alumni ==
=== Art ===
- Bunny Hoest, cartoonist of the comic strip The Lockhorns

=== Business ===
- Ray Dalio, founder of Bridgewater Associates
- Howard Lorber, businessman; investor; CEO of Vector Group; chairman of Nathan's Famous and Douglas Elliman
- Jorge M. Perez, real estate developer, author and political fundraiser; founder of the Related Companies
- Adnan Polat, chairman of Football Club Galatasaray SK; CEO of Ege Seramik
- Terry Semel, former chairman and CEO of Yahoo!; on the board of directors of Polo Ralph Lauren Corporation, the Paley Center for Media, and the Guggenheim Museum
- John Utendahl, founder and owner of Utendahl Group, the largest African-American-owned investment banking organization in the US
- Gary Winnick, founder of Global Crossing, Ltd., installing the first undersea cable linking the U.S. and Europe

=== Judicial ===
- Rose Bird, first woman to serve as chief justice on the Supreme Court of California

=== Media ===
- A. J. Benza, television show host, actor (Celebrity Fit Club)
- Ted David, senior anchor at CNBC Business Radio
- John Edward, television host and producer
- Arnold Hano, journalist, author, editor
- Jackee Harry, known for her roles on the television series 227, Another World, and Designing Women, and the Rodney Dangerfield movie Ladybugs
- Alfred R. Kahn, chairman and CEO, 4Kids Entertainment
- Jamie Kellner, chairman and CEO of ACME Communications
- Brian Kilmeade, television presenter and current co-host of Fox and Friends and Brian the Judge
- Lynda Lopez, news anchor; sister of Jennifer Lopez
- Nancy Hicks Maynard, first black female reporter for the New York Times; she and her husband are the first African-Americans to own a major U.S. metropolitan newspaper, Oakland Tribune; they co-founded the Robert C. Maynard Institute for Journalism Education
- Burl Osborne, former chairman of the Associated Press and former publisher of the Dallas Morning News
- Sibila Vargas, news anchor
- Larry Wachtel, the "voice of Wall Street"; former senior vice president at Wachovia; financial analyst at Prudential Financial; respected financial markets commentator on WINS (AM) radio in New York City

=== Medicine and health ===
- Ruth Kirschstein, former acting director of the National Institute of Health and the National Center for Complementary and Alternative Medicine; namesake of Ruth L. Kirschstein National Research Service Awards

=== Performing arts ===
- Ed Lauter, actor
- Dina Meyer, actress
- Nicholas Pileggi, screenwriter and author
- Michael Tucci, actor
- Denise Vasi, actress

=== Politics ===
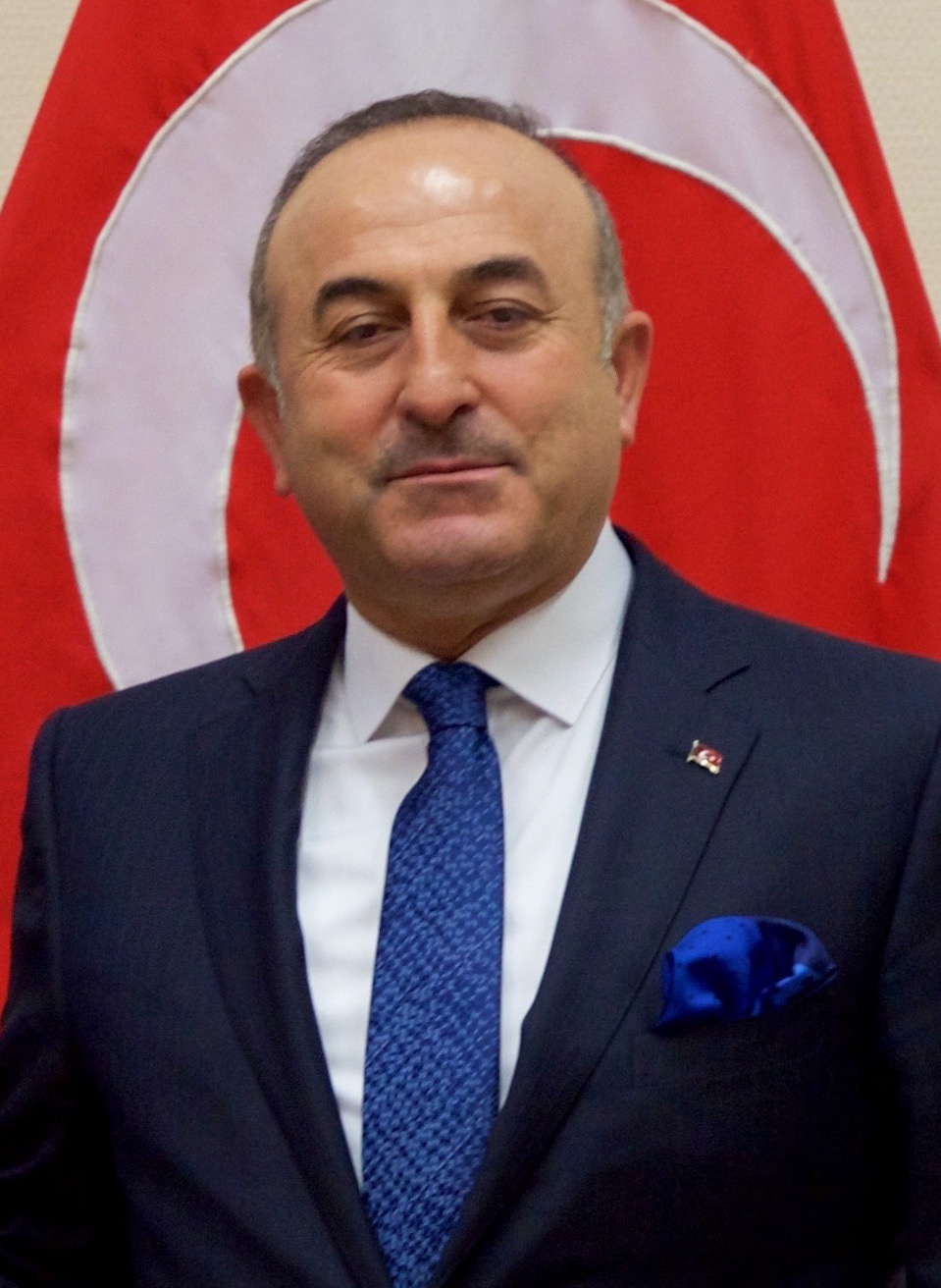
Mevlut Cavusoglu

- Tim Bishop, representative of the State of New York's 1st Congressional District in the House of Representatives in the United States Congress
- Leon Bogues, former senator who represented the 29th District in the New York State Senate
- Mevlut Cavusoglu, incumbent Turkish Minister of Foreign Affairs
- Steven Cymbrowitz, representative of the 45th District in the New York State Assembly
- Tuariki Delamere, former member of parliament for the Eastern Maori (now Ikaroa-Rāwhiti) electorate in the Parliament of New Zealand and cabinet minister, including Minister of Immigration
- Katuutire Kaura, member of parliament in the National Assembly of the Republic of Namibia; leader of the Democratic Turnhalle Alliance of Namibia
- Rammohan Naidu Kinjarapu, Indian politician, member of parliament to the 16th Lok Sabha from Srikakulam, Andhra Pradesh
- Tom Ognibene, former representative of the 30th City Council District in the New York City Council and New York City mayoral candidate
- Tinga Seisay, Sierra Leonean diplomat and pro-democracy advocate
- L. Harvey Smith, representative of the 31st District in the New Jersey General Assembly
- Fred Thiele, representative of the 2nd District in the New York State Assembly

=== Sports and recreation ===
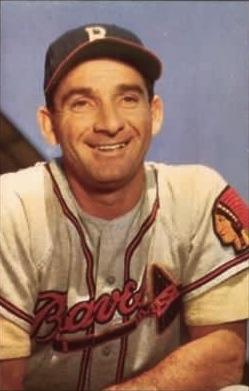
Sid Gordon

- Mooley Avishar (born 1947), Israeli basketball player
- Hank Beenders, first non-American to play in the NBA Finals
- Frank Catalanotto, retired Major League Baseball outfielder
- John Collins, former president and chief executive officer of the NFL Cleveland Browns
- Daniel de Oliveira, Rookie of the Year 1987, Northeast Conference; first LIU Blackbird soccer player to play with DC United in 1996 Major League Soccer; coach of the Venezuelan Youth 15 and 17 national teams
- Ray Felix, second African-American to be named an NBA All-Star; the NBA's first dominant African-American center
- Frido Frey, first German to play in the NBA
- Sid Gordon, two-time All Star major league baseball player
- David Hicks (born 1988), basketball player for Ironi Nahariya of the Israeli Basketball Premier League
- Charles Rahmel Jones, played for the NBA's Chicago Bulls
- Dolly King, one of the few black basketball players in the National Basketball League, predecessor to the NBA
- Barry Leibowitz (born 1945), American-Israeli basketball player in the American Basketball Association and the Israeli Basketball Premier League
- Joe Machnik, elected to the National Soccer Hall of Fame on the 2017 builder ballot
- Steve Nisenson, basketball player
- Frank Pia, inventor of the Pia Carry
- Ossie Schectman, member of the original New York Knickerbockers in their inaugural NBA season in 1946; inductee in the National Jewish Museum Sports Hall of Fame
- Tazz (Peter Senerchia), also known as Tazz in WWE, wrestler and commentator, ECW and TNA

== Notable faculty ==
=== Past ===
- Vincent de Tourdonnet, one of Canada's foremost writers of musical theatre
- Pee Wee Kirkland, former street basketball player from New York City; taught the "Philosophy of Basketball Coaching"
- Gerda Lerner, pioneer of women's history as an academic discipline
- Lillian Rosanoff Lieber, mathematician and author
- Marysa Navarro, historian

=== Present ===
- Bob Brier, noted Egyptologist and one of the world's leading experts on mummies
