= Utrice Leid =

Trinidadian-American editor and activist (born c. 1953)

Utrice C. Leid
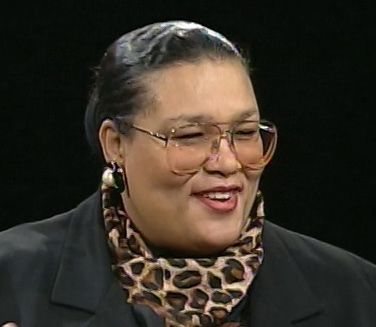
- Leid on CUNY TV's Urban Agenda (1997)
- Born: c. 1953; Princes Town, Trinidad and Tobago
- Occupation: Journalist
- Notable credit(s): Trans-Urban News Service, The City Sun, WBAI

Utrice C. Leid (born c. 1953) is a Trinidadian American, former activist in the Civil Rights Movement, and journalist. She was the managing editor of The City Sun and general manager of New York radio station WBAI. In 2004, The Miami Herald wrote that she "prides herself on never working in the mainstream media during her 34 years of journalism".

Leid was the host of Leid Stories on Progressive Radio Network until 2023.

== Life and career ==
Leid was born in Princes Town, Trinidad, the seventh child of Claude and Gertrude Leid. When she was 18, Leid came to the United States and attended Adelphi University. She returned to Trinidad and Tobago, where she spent nine months investigating the aftermath of an unsuccessful coup d'état. Leid's research was cut short when the government seized her notes. She decided to move back to the United States.

Leid worked as a receptionist at the New York Amsterdam News for six months, and in 1977 she and Andrew W. Cooper, a columnist at the newspaper, left to establish the Trans-Urban News Service (TUNS). TUNS trained minority journalists and produced reporting that was relevant to their communities. The Public Relations Society of America gave TUNS its top award in 1979 for its multi-part series on racial tensions between blacks and Jews in Crown Heights.

Cooper and Leid co-founded The City Sun, a weekly newspaper that covered issues of interest to African Americans in New York City, in 1984. According to The New York Times, The City Sun had a circulation of 18,500 in 1987. Leid resigned from the paper in 1992 after a dispute with Cooper. By one account, she asked Cooper for complete control of the paper and he refused. By her account, Leid left because Cooper was inflating the newspaper's circulation. The New York Times reported that readers of The City Sun said the paper published "its most hard-hitting issues" during Leid's tenure, and that it "stopped being [a] must-read" after she left.

In 1993, Leid started working at WBAI, where she hosted a talk radio program called Talkback! The New York Daily News described the show as "serious talk" and said that Leid covered a wide range of topics. The Daily News also noted that Leid sometimes gave her listeners homework.

On December 22, 2000, the board of directors of Pacifica Radio, which controlled WBAI, removed the station's general manager Valerie Van Isler and asked Leid to replace her. Two other long-time staff members were also dismissed. Leid and Pacifica's executive director Bessie Wash changed the locks at the station's doors. The changes, which became known as the "Christmas Coup", prompted several protest demonstrations that involved more than 1,000 people.

On March 5, 2001, Leid interrupted an interview with Congressmember Major Owens, who was discussing the events at WBAI. "Lies have been told," she announced, and began to broadcast a music program. In August, Amy Goodman, the host of WBAI's Democracy Now!, said that Leid had shoved her during a heated discussion. By late 2001, several groups of listeners and dissident radio hosts sued the Pacifica board. The board settled the lawsuits and agreed to grant more autonomy to WBAI. Leid resigned her position in December.

In 2002 Leid moved to Florida, and in 2004 she became editor of The Broward Times, a weekly newspaper that focused on issues of interest to African Americans and Afro-Caribbean Americans in Broward County.
