= Sequoyah Wharton =

American educator, author, and media-literacy advocate

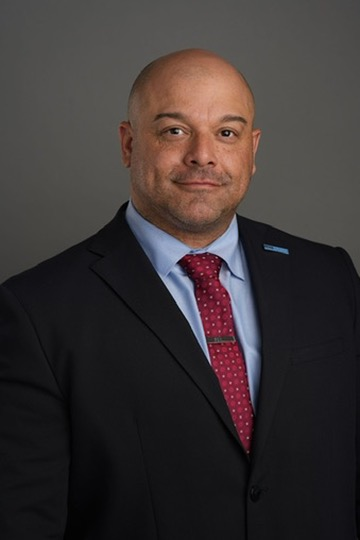
- Sequoyah Wharton in 2026
- Education: Long Island University (Ed.D)
- Occupations: Educator, author, and media-literacy advocate
- Known for: Arts education, digital storytelling, media literacy, and student journalism
- Notable work: The Play Advantage: Global and Indigenous Perspectives in Higher Education

Sequoyah Wharton is an American educator, author, media literacy advocate, and former Albert Einstein Distinguished Educator Fellow whose work focuses on visual arts, digital filmmaking, student journalism, culturally responsive education, and global learning. He taught visual arts, digital filmmaking, broadcast journalism, and media communications at Brentwood High School in New York and has participated in educational and policy initiatives involving PBS News Student Reporting Labs, the United States Patent and Trademark Office, the United States Department of Energy, and the National Academies of Sciences, Engineering, and Medicine.

Wharton was selected as a Top 50 finalist for the 2025 Global Teacher Prize, named an Educator of the Year by Discovery Education, and presented with the National Association for Media Literacy Education's Media Literacy Teacher Award.

== Education and research ==
Wharton earned a Doctor of Education from Long Island University in 2020. His dissertation, The Effects of Exposure to Visual Arts Programming on the Academic Outcomes of Secondary Latinx Students: A Causal-Comparative Study, examined the relationship between exposure to secondary visual-arts programming and academic outcomes among Latinx students.

The dissertation was later cited in an article published in Frontiers in Psychology examining the relationships among visual-art activities, family socioeconomic status, parent–child relationships, and adolescent development.

== Career ==
=== Teaching and educational leadership ===
Wharton taught visual arts, digital filmmaking, broadcast journalism, and media communications at Brentwood High School on Long Island. His instructional work incorporated documentary filmmaking, student storytelling, global education, visual communication, and the use of media production to examine social and environmental subjects.

A 2024 profile published by Patch Media discussed Wharton's work at Brentwood and his teaching in the visual arts, digital film, and broadcasting. The profile described his support for students and his efforts to connect classroom learning with global experiences and practical media-production skills.

In a 2024 interview published by Pro Tapes, Wharton discussed interdisciplinary media and visual-arts instruction, the challenges of teaching technical and creative skills, and the use of tape as an artistic medium in student work.

Wharton served as headmaster of Long Island University's Scholars Academy in Southampton. The academy was established to provide high-school students with accelerated academic opportunities, enrichment programs, and exposure to college-level study.

He has also taught as an adjunct instructor in higher education. Routledge's biography for The Play Advantage identifies him as an adjunct associate professor at Molloy University and an adjunct professor at Suffolk County Community College.

=== Media literacy and student journalism ===
Wharton incorporated PBS News Student Reporting Labs and its StoryMaker resources into his teaching. PBS Student Reporting Labs selected him for its September 2023 Teacher Feature, describing him as a digital film, broadcast-journalism, and visual-arts teacher who used journalism and storytelling to support critical thinking, creativity, and global perspectives.

In the PBS profile, Wharton discussed using StoryMaker activities to encourage students to examine culture, community, environmental responsibility, and human impacts on the planet. He also described filmmaking and digital-media tools as ways for students to build practical skills and communicate their perspectives.

Wharton later appeared on the PBS Student Reporting Labs podcast Teacher Reporting Labs. In 2024, he participated in a live episode about educators' interests outside the classroom, professional fulfillment, and well-being.

In 2025, he was interviewed on the Global Career Tech Education Podcast about digital storytelling, student voice, media literacy, Indigenous and global perspectives in education, and career and technical education in an artificial-intelligence-driven economy.

He was also among the educators participating in the 2024 PBS News Student Reporting Labs teacher workshop.

PBS NewsHour Classroom selected Wharton as one of its 2023–2024 Invention Education Fellows. The fellowship brought together educators interested in invention, media production, student-centered problem solving, and the development of instructional resources.

In 2025, the National Association for Media Literacy Education presented Wharton with its Media Literacy Teacher Award.

=== Invention education and the USPTO ===
Wharton participated in the United States Patent and Trademark Office's 2024 National Summer Teacher Institute on Innovation. The professional-development program introduces educators to invention, intellectual property, entrepreneurship, project-based learning, and prototype development.

During the institute's invention challenge, Wharton worked on a team that developed and presented a proposed duckweed-based beverage. The project incorporated product development, branding, trademark concepts, advertising, and pitching, and the team received the institute's Best Overall Pitch recognition.

The USPTO later invited Wharton and fellow institute participant Stephanie Klixbull to speak during a January 2025 information session for educators interested in the program. They discussed their participation in the institute and the incorporation of intellectual-property and invention-education concepts into classroom instruction. The agency subsequently linked to a recording of the session in an article promoting invention education for teachers.

=== National Academies workshop ===
In June 2026, Wharton participated as an invited practitioner panelist in the National Academies of Sciences, Engineering, and Medicine workshop Media Literacy Education for Children and Youth. The two-day workshop brought together educators, librarians, curriculum developers, researchers, program providers, organizations, funders, and policymakers to discuss educational needs and promising practices in media-literacy instruction.

Wharton spoke during the session “Understanding Practitioner Practices around Media Literacy Education in School and Out of School Settings.” The session examined how practitioners design and facilitate learning experiences that support media literacy among children and youth, as well as the challenges educators face in a rapidly changing information environment.

A recording of the practitioner session was subsequently made available through the National Academies' Vimeo channel.

=== Albert Einstein Distinguished Educator Fellowship ===
Wharton was selected as a 2025–2026 Albert Einstein Distinguished Educator Fellow. The fellowship is administered through the United States Department of Energy's Office of Science and places experienced kindergarten-through-grade-12 educators in congressional offices and federal agencies. His official fellowship profile lists his placement as the United States House of Representatives.

=== Professional organizations ===
Wharton has served on the board of the Broadcast Alliance for Senior High, an organization supporting broadcast-journalism education and student media programs. The organization's team biography describes his work in digital filmmaking, storytelling, media literacy, and culturally responsive instruction.

Routledge identifies Wharton as director of the Empowering Global Educators Foundation, a nonprofit organization focused on global collaboration and educator development.

== Publications ==
Wharton contributed the chapter “Using Role Play to Understand the Impacts of Social Media through Action Research” to the Routledge volume Supporting Adult Learners through Games and Interactive Teaching: A Practical Guide, published in 2022.

He and Edward Gonsalves are the editors of the forthcoming Routledge volume The Play Advantage: Global and Indigenous Perspectives in Higher Education. Routledge describes the work as a multidisciplinary volume examining play as a pedagogical and knowledge-building practice informed by Indigenous knowledge systems and international perspectives.

Wharton also wrote the volume's opening chapter, “Reimagining Education Through Play, Story, and Justice: Weaving Indigenous Ways of Knowing into Global Learning.”

=== Selected works ===
- Wharton, Sequoyah. The Effects of Exposure to Visual Arts Programming on the Academic Outcomes of Secondary Latinx Students: A Causal-Comparative Study. Doctoral dissertation, Long Island University, 2020.
- Wharton, Sequoyah. “Using Role Play to Understand the Impacts of Social Media through Action Research.” In Supporting Adult Learners through Games and Interactive Teaching: A Practical Guide. Routledge, 2022.
- Wharton, Sequoyah, and Edward Gonsalves, eds. The Play Advantage: Global and Indigenous Perspectives in Higher Education. Routledge, forthcoming 2027. ISBN 978-1-0411-3766-5.
- Wharton, Sequoyah. “Reimagining Education Through Play, Story, and Justice: Weaving Indigenous Ways of Knowing into Global Learning.” In The Play Advantage: Global and Indigenous Perspectives in Higher Education. Routledge, forthcoming 2027.

== Awards and recognition ==
News 12 Long Island featured Wharton in its Hometown Heroes series.

Wharton was later recognized as a Long Island School Hero through an initiative of the Long Island Coalition Against Bullying. Newsday reported on the educators and school personnel honored through the initiative.

In 2025, Wharton was selected as one of 50 finalists for the Global Teacher Prize. His finalist profile discussed his use of project-based instruction, documentary filmmaking, digital storytelling, student journalism, global learning, and culturally responsive teaching.

Discovery Education selected Wharton as one of its 2025 Educators of the Year. The organization cited his student-centered teaching, digital storytelling, documentary filmmaking, and development of filmmaking and journalism opportunities for students.

The National Association for Media Literacy Education presented Wharton with its 2025 Media Literacy Teacher Award.
