= Clay Lancaster =

American historian (1917–2000)

Clay Lancaster (March 30, 1917 – December 25, 2000), was an authority on American architecture, an orientalist, and an influential advocate of historical preservation. According to The New York Times, Lancaster's 1961 study of the architecture of Brooklyn Heights "proved to be one of the earliest and loudest shots in the historic preservation struggle in New York City.”

== Writings ==
=== Architecture and art history ===
Lancaster's best-known books of architectural and art history are Architectural Follies in America (1960), Ante Bellum Houses of the Bluegrass (1961), Old Brooklyn Heights: New York's First Suburb (1961), The Japanese Influence in America (1963), Prospect Park Handbook (1967), The Architecture of Historic Nantucket (1972), New York Interiors at the Turn of the Century (1976), Nantucket in the Nineteenth Century (1979), The American Bungalow (1985), Antebellum Architecture of Kentucky (1991), The Arts and Crafts of the Animals (1993), The Breadth and Depth of East and West (1995), and Pleasant Hill: Shaker Canaan in Kentucky (2000). A collection of his photographs appears in James D. Birchfield, Clay Lancaster's Kentucky: Architectural Photographs of a Preservation Pioneer (2007).

=== Children’s books ===
Lancaster also wrote and illustrated books for children. The Periwinkle Steamboat (1961) was later redesigned and re-published as The Flight of the Periwinkle (1987). Michiko, or Mrs. Belmont's Brownstone on Brooklyn Heights was published in 1965. The Toy Room appeared in 1988, Figi in 1989, and The Runaway Prince in 1991.

Lancaster's style received high praise. Alan Priest, former curator of Far Eastern Art at the Metropolitan Museum of Art noted in his introduction to The Japanese Influence in America that "the prose is most agreeable to read and the subject matter so interesting that one is led to read almost as if it were a historical novel." The poet Marianne Moore, introducing Lancaster's Prospect Park Handbook (1967), writes: "his pages are art."

== Biography ==
Lancaster was born in Lexington, Kentucky, and studied at the University of Kentucky. He spent half of 1936 at the Art Students League of New York. Returning to Lexington, he served as stage designer for the university's Guignol Theatre and was also elected to Phi Beta Kappa. He took his A.B. in Art in 1938. Like many queer men of his generation, Lancaster was closeted with regards to his sexuality; though friends close to him have since confirmed that he was a gay man.

In 1943, Lancaster moved to New York and, as a graduate student there, worked in Columbia University's Avery Architectural and Fine Arts Library with Talbot Hamlin, biographer of Benjamin Henry Latrobe.

At Columbia, Lancaster received the appointment of Ware Librarian. In the fifties he lectured at Cooper Union, Columbia, and the Traphagen art school in New York. In 1968 he originated a course, "Asian Art and its Influence on Europe and America," that was given at New York University.

In 1954 and 1955, during the first of two John Simon Guggenheim Fellowships, he carried out the research that underlay The Japanese Influence in America (1963); a second Guggenheim, in 1963 and 1964, supported research on the architecture of Kentucky. In 1966, Parks Commissioner Thomas Hoving appointed Lancaster curator of Brooklyn's Prospect Park, Frederick Law Olmsted's landscape masterpiece, an assignment which led to his preparation of The Prospect Park Handbook (1967).

In 1971, Clay Lancaster moved from Brooklyn to Nantucket. Here he restored an 1829 saltbox dwelling and wrote studies of historic Nantucket, of Victorian architecture, and of train terminals and stations.

Lancaster returned to live in Kentucky in 1978, purchasing Warwick, a Federal-era residence on the Kentucky River. Here he spent the first winter making mantels for fireplaces in an addition, shelves for the library, and cabinets for the kitchen. During the following spring he gave a course on Kentucky architecture at Transylvania University, and it became a seminar in the College of Architecture at the University of Kentucky in the fall. In 1980 he presented a class on "Asian Art and Its Influence on Europe and America" at Transylvania. In 1983, as Morgan Professor at the University of Louisville, he repeated the Kentucky architecture course and conducted a seminar on "Asian Influences on Western Architecture." During this period he wrote and illustrated The American Bungalow, 1880–1930. Also he produced a study on the World Parliament of Religions (1987), which was held at the Chicago Columbian Exposition of 1893; the book was published in England in May 1987.

== Awards and honors ==
Lancaster received a Certificate of Merit from the Municipal Art Society of New York City in 1962 for his book Old Brooklyn Heights. In 1966 he was given a citation from the president of the Borough of Brooklyn for his work on the Prospect Park Centennial Committee. In 1975 he was elected to the Hall of Distinguished Alumni at the University of Kentucky. The Alabama Historical Commission presented him in 1975 with its Award of Merit for Preservation of Alabama's Heritage for his study of Greek Revival architecture in Alabama, published by the Alabama chapter of the American Institute of Architects in 1966 (and again by the Commission in 1977). In 1979, for Vestiges of the Venerable City, he received the Lexington-Fayette County Historic Commission Preservation Award and, in the same year, the Kentucky Heritage Commission's Preservation Professional Award. In 1986, the Blue Grass Trust for Historic Preservation presented him its John Wesley Hunt Award.

== Warwick ==
In addition to the original Moses Jones hall and parlor dwelling, on the grounds of Warwick, Lancaster built several architectural follies of his own design—an eighteenth-century tea pavilion, a guest-house replicating the first-century A.D. Tower of the Winds, and an Arts and Crafts style art gallery. He also assembled an extensive acreage nearby to serve as a nature preserve, called Shantalaya ("abode of peace"). Also, in his final years, Lancaster established a charitable organization, The Warwick Foundation, to promote and extend his many interests. The foundation sponsors tours, lectures, scholarships, exhibitions, conferences, and maintains the Warwick compound as a museum.

Lancaster died on Christmas Day in 2000. The following spring, his ashes were scattered in the ravine next to his Warwick residence.
