= Andrew W. Cooper =

- Born: August 21, 1927; Brooklyn, New York
- Died: January 28, 2002 (aged 74); Brooklyn, New York
- Occupation: Journalist
- Notable credit(s): Trans-Urban News Service, The City Sun

Andrew W. Cooper (August 21, 1927 – January 28, 2002) was an African-American activist during the Civil Rights Movement, businessman, and journalist. He was the publisher and editor-in-chief of The City Sun.

== Biography ==
Cooper was born in 1927 in Brooklyn, New York. He attended Boys High School and Adelphi University. From 1951 through 1971, he was an executive of the F. & M. Schaefer Brewing Company.

In 1965, Cooper brought suit under the Voting Rights Act of 1965 against racial gerrymandering. African Americans and Latinos made up the majority of the Bedford-Stuyvesant neighborhood in which he lived, but the neighborhood was divided among five congressional districts, each represented by a white Congressmember. Cooper opposed districts drawn in what he described as "so tortuous, artificial and labyrinthine a manner that the lines are irrational and unrelated to any proper purpose". His lawsuit, Cooper v. Power, was successful. It resulted in the creation of New York's 12th Congressional District and the election in 1968 of Shirley Chisholm, the first black woman ever elected to the U.S. Congress.

In the 1970s, Cooper left the business world to become a journalist. He started the Trans-Urban News Service (TUNS) in 1977, with the dual goals of training minority journalists and producing reporting that was relevant to their communities. The Public Relations Society of America gave TUNS its top award in 1979 for its multi-part series on racial tensions between blacks and Jews in Crown Heights. Cooper wrote a weekly column, "One Man's Opinion", for the Amsterdam News and also wrote for The Village Voice.

Cooper founded The City Sun, a weekly newspaper that covered issues of interest to African Americans in New York City, in 1984. According to The New York Times, The City Sun had a circulation of 18,500 in 1987. Financial difficulties forced Cooper to shut down The City Sun in 1996.

Cooper was recognized as Journalist of the Year by the National Association of Black Journalists in 1987 for his work at The City Sun.

Cooper died in Brooklyn in 2002 of a stroke.
