= Long Island University =

Private university in New York, US

Coordinates: 40°49′8″N 73°35′38″W

- Motto: Urbi et Orbi (Latin)
- Motto in English: To the city and to the world
- Type: Private university
- Established: 1926 (100 years ago)
- Endowment: $510.15 million (2025)
- President: Kimberly R. Cline
- Faculty: 962 (fall 2023)
- Students: 16,689 (fall 2024)
- Undergraduates: 12,072 (fall 2024)
- Postgraduates: 4,617 (fall 2024)
- Location: Brooklyn and Brookville, New York, U.S.
- Campus: Urban, LIU Brooklyn, 11 acres (4.5 ha) Suburban, LIU Post, 330 acres (130 ha)
- Newspapers: Seawanhaka (Brooklyn campus); The Tide (Post campus)
- Colors: Blue and gold
- Nickname: Sharks
- Sporting affiliations: NCAA Division I FCS – NEC
- Website: liu.edu

Long Island University (LIU) is a private research university in Brooklyn and Brookville, New York, United States. LIU is classified among "R2: Doctoral Universities – High research activity" according to the Carnegie Classification of Institutions of Higher Education. The university enrolls over 16,000 students and offers over 500 academic programs at its main campuses, LIU Brooklyn and LIU Post on Long Island, in addition to non-residential locations and online. The LIU Sharks athletic teams compete in NCAA Division I as a Northeast Conference member. LIU hosts and sponsors the annual George Polk Awards in journalism.

== History ==
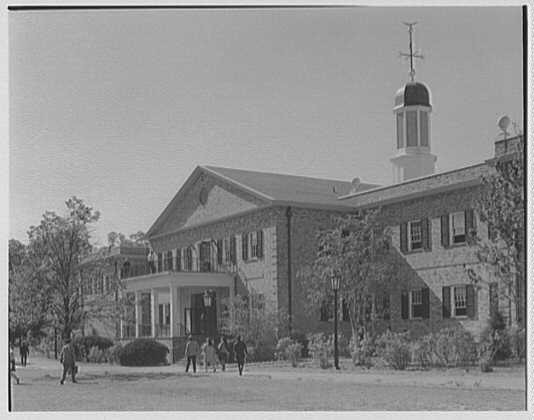
C.W. Post College in Brookville, New York, in 1967

=== 20th century ===
LIU was chartered by the New York State Education Department in 1926 in Brooklyn, to provide "effective and moderately priced education" to people from "all walks of life". LIU Brooklyn is located in Downtown Brooklyn, at the corner of Flatbush and DeKalb Avenues. The main building adjoins the 1920s movie house Paramount Theatre; the building retains much of the original decorative detail and a fully operational Wurlitzer organ. The campus consists of nine academic buildings; a recreation and athletic complex that includes Division I regulation athletic fields; one on-campus and two nearby residential buildings; and an adjoining parking facility.

The campus is home to the university's oldest school, the Arnold & Marie Schwartz College of Pharmacy and Health Sciences, founded in 1891 as the Brooklyn College of Pharmacy, and LIU Global, a four-year bachelor's degree program that allows students to live and study internationally in eight countries across eight semesters.

The LIU athletic teams, the Sharks, compete at the NCAA Division I level The university sponsors the George Polk Awards for excellence in journalism, and hosts and manages the Kumble Theater for the Performing Arts.

In 1951, in response to a growing number of families moving to the suburbs, LIU purchased an 177-acre (72 ha) estate known as Hillwood from cereal heiress Marjorie Merriweather Post and her third husband Joseph E. Davies. Located in Brookville on Long Island's Gold Coast, the original home, Warburton Hall, was built by William A. Prime and was extensively renovated by Marjorie and her second husband Edward F. Hutton. Three years later, the campus was renamed C. W. Post, in honor of Marjorie Post's father C. W. Post, a pioneering food entrepreneur.

=== 21st century ===
In 2012, the university renamed all campuses. C. W. Post is now LIU Post, the university's largest campus, at 307 acres (125 hectares) consisting of historic 1920s mansions (such as "Hutfield," "Mariemont," the J. Randolph Robinson residence, and the Adelaide Breevort Hutton residence), gardens, athletic fields, art studios and performing arts space, broadcast television and radio stations, an on-campus sustainable energy facility, and the only on-campus equestrian facility on Long Island. LIU Post was home to the NCAA Division II LIU Post Pioneers and is the site of the Tilles Center for the Performing Arts. The school introduced its first online degree plan in 2004.

In March 2013, LIU named Kimberly R. Cline the university's tenth president. She is the first woman to lead the private, six-campus institution.

==== 2016–17 lockout ====
Cline outsourced the work of two groups of previously unionized workers on campus, and oversaw the lockout of 400 faculty on the day prior to the beginning of the 2016–17 school year.

On September 1, 2016, three days after the union's contract expired and five days before the union was due to vote on the new contract, the university cut off the affected staff's email accounts and health insurance, and told them they would be replaced. This was the first time that a college or university in the United States has used a lockout against its faculty members, according to William A. Herbert, executive director of the National Center for the Study of Collective Bargaining in Higher Education and the Professions.

Following the lockout, the American Association of University Professors released a statement that it "deplores this action and supports the right of the LIU Brooklyn faculty to collectively bargain in good faith with its administration", and urged the LIU administration to resume negotiations. In the first week of the autumn term, some students at LIU Brooklyn staged a walkout in support of the locked-out teaching staff.

With the 236 full-time faculty members and 450 adjuncts locked out, classes were taught by university administrators and temporary staff, and students reported inadequate instruction. The lockout ended on September 14 with an agreement to continue the expired contract until May 31, 2017, and resume negotiations with a mediator.

==== COVID-19 pandemic ====
In response to the COVID-19 pandemic, Long Island University moved all classes to online instruction for the remainder of the Spring 2020 semester. Following a stay-at-home order from then-Governor Andrew Cuomo directing all non-essential businesses to work remotely, administrative and academic offices began operating virtually and LIU fired or furloughed employees whose work was perceived as non-amenable to working remotely, including 84 of 98 unionized employees.

Instruction in summer 2020 was conducted online and LIU began offering in-person instruction again beginning on September 8, 2020, with online options for people unable to attend lectures. Following the Thanksgiving recess, all instruction became online, with LIU resuming in-person instruction starting on February 1, 2021, at the start of the spring semester.

== Organization ==
LIU is administered by a president and a 27-member board of trustees who elect the president.

== Campuses ==
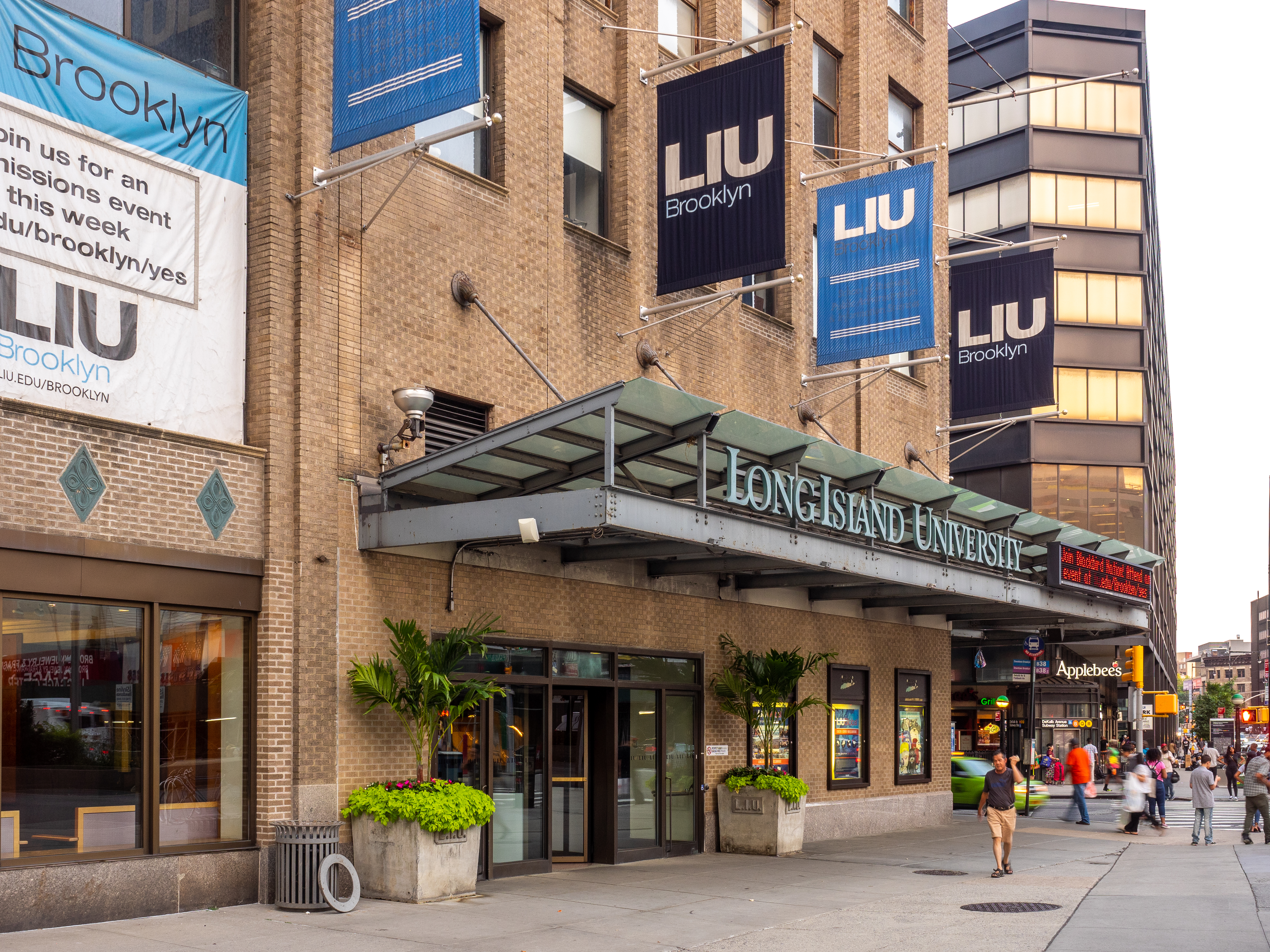
LIU Brooklyn student union building

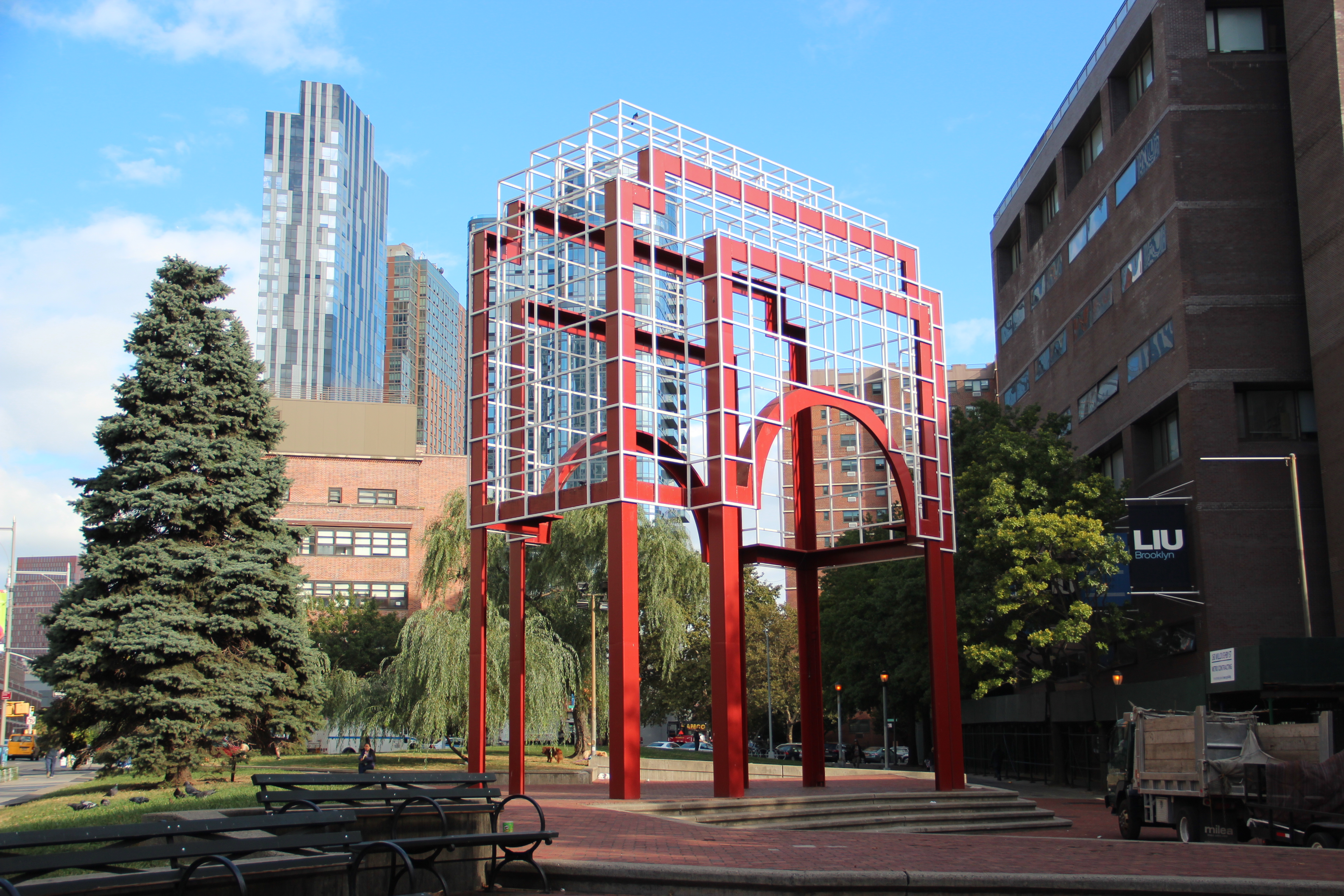
Entrance arch at LIU Brooklyn

=== LIU Brooklyn ===
LIU Brooklyn includes:

- LIU Pharmacy, the Arnold and Marie Schwartz College of Pharmacy and Health Sciences
- LIU Global (formerly Global College)
- Richard Conolly College of Liberal Arts & Sciences
- School of Education
- School of Engineering, Computer Science and Artificial Intelligence
- Harriet Rothkopf Heilbrunn School of Nursing
- School of Professional and Continuing Studies
- School of Business, Public Administration and Information Sciences
- School of Arts & Communication
- Honors College

=== LIU Post ===
LIU Post includes:

- Lewyt College of Veterinary Medicine
- College of Education, Information & Technology
- College of Liberal Arts and Sciences
- School of Business
- School of Engineering, Computer Science and Artificial Intelligence
- School of Professional Accountancy
- School of Computer Science, Innovation & Management Engineering
- School of Health Professions and Nursing
- School of Visual Arts Communication & Design
- School of Performing Arts
- Honors College

=== Lewyt College of Veterinary Medicine ===
The veterinary college's inaugural class began instruction in Fall 2020. At the time of its founding, there were only 30 vet colleges in the United States. For over 150 years, the only vet school in the state was the New York State College of Veterinary Medicine at Cornell University in Ithaca, New York. However, political pressure grew for a second school in the New York City area. In May 2018, New York State granted $12 million to LIU to develop a vet school. Pre-clinical instruction is based in Brentwood, NY. Instead of developing its own veterinary hospital, LIU's clinical programs are taught at existing veterinary hospitals and practices. The LIU Vet School has received a provisional accreditation and awarded its first DVM degrees in 2024.

=== LIU Global ===
LIU Global offers a four-year Global Studies degree program that sends students abroad to Latin America, Europe, and Australia. Students travel with their own cohort for their entire four years abroad, gaining strong connections with fellow students.

LIU Global Includes:

- A Costa Rica Center
- A Europe Program
- An Australia/Pacific Program
- A New York Center (LIU Brooklyn)

=== Other LIU locations ===
LIU Brentwood offers undergraduate and/or graduate programs in education, special education, literacy, mental health counseling, school counseling, psychology, criminal justice, and nursing.

LIU Hudson offers graduate and advanced certificate programs in business, public administration, pharmaceutics, education (early childhood, childhood, literacy, special education, and TESOL), educational leadership, school counseling, school psychology, mental health counseling, and marriage and family therapy.

LIU Riverhead is home to the Homeland Security Management Institute, which offers homeland security training. The institute has been designated a "Homeland Security Center of Excellence" by the United States Congress. Programs are also available in education, special education, literacy, communication studies, new media, cyber security, applied behavior analysis, and TESOL.

== Ranking ==
The 2026 edition of U.S. News & World Report ranked LIU 373rd among National Universities.

== Athletics ==
On October 3, 2018, Long Island University announced that it was unifying the athletic programs of its two campuses into one Division I program, effective with the 2019–20 academic year. The new program's nickname of Sharks was announced on May 15, 2019. The Sharks retain the Brooklyn campus's affiliation in the Northeast Conference.

The Sharks added two completely new women's sports effective in 2019–20. Shortly before the athletic merger was announced, LIU Brooklyn announced that it would add women's ice hockey; that sport will carry over to the unified program. Shortly after the merger announcement, LIU announced it would add women's water polo, placing that sport in the Metro Atlantic Athletic Conference.

== Media ==
LIU Public Radio, WCWP, broadcasts on 88.1.

LIU Brooklyn's student newspaper is Seawanhaka, and LIU Post's student newspaper is The Tide.

== Notable alumni ==
- Alex the Astronaut, Australian singer and songwriter
- Shmuel Avishar, Israeli basketball player
- Jules Bender, consensus All-American college basketball player
- Paul Broadie II, president, Santa Fe College
- Barbara Butcher, death examiner and memoir writer
- Vinnette Justine Carroll, former playwright, actress, and theatre director
- Robert L. Caslen, U.S. Army general, 59th Superintendent of the United States Military Academy, and 29th president of the University of South Carolina
- Mevlüt Çavuşoğlu, Turkish politician, Grand National Assembly of Turkey member, and former Minister of Foreign Affairs of Turkey
- Ray Dalio, founder of Bridgewater Associates, investor, and philanthropist
- Tony Fabrizio, Republican Party pollster and strategist
- Joe Gatto, comedian and actor
- Sid Gordon, 2x Major League Baseball All-Star outfielder and third baseman
- Ben Kramer, Haggerty Award-winning college basketball player
- Vin Lananna, Team USA Olympic coach, USA Track & Field president, former CEO of TrackTown USA, and the university's athletic director
- Barry Leibowitz (born 1945), American-Israeli basketball player in the American Basketball Association and the Israeli Basketball Premier League
- Ivan Leshinsky, American-Israeli basketball player
- Shawn Liao, basketball player and opera patron
- Dov Markus, Israeli-American soccer player
- Charles F. Masterson, special assistant to President Eisenhower
- Dina Meyer, actress
- Ram Mohan Naidu Kinjarapu, Member of Parliament in Lok Sabha, the lower house of Parliament of India
- Peter Nilsson, Swedish soccer player
- Neil Raymond Ricco, poet and writer
- Brenden Rodney, Canadian sprinter
- Julie Ann Sageer, Television host and chef
- Ossie Schectman, basketball player who scored the first basket in NBA history
- Richie Scheinblum, Major League Baseball All-Star outfielder
- Tinga Seisay, Sierra Leonean diplomat and pro-democracy activist
- Irv Torgoff, professional basketball player and Haggerty Award winner
- Steve Turner (born 1946), professional tennis player and tennis coach
- Denise Vasi, actress
- Kent Washington, First American as well as the first black professional basketball player to play behind the Iron Curtain
- Sequoyah Wharton, educator, author, media-literacy advocate
- Olubukola Arowolo Verheijen, Special Adviser to the President of Nigeria on Oil and Gas.

== Notable faculty ==
- Berenice Robinson (1909–1990), author and composer
- Lewis Warsh (1944–2020), New York School poet, visual artist, professor, prose writer, editor, and publisher

== See also ==
- List of Long Island University people
