= The City Sun =

American newspaper published in Brooklyn, New York

- Type: Weekly newspaper
- Format: Newspaper format
- Owner: Andrew W. Cooper
- Founded: 1984
- Ceased publication: 1996
- Headquarters: Brooklyn, New York
- Circulation: 18,500 (1987)

The City Sun was a weekly newspaper that was published in Brooklyn from 1984 through 1996. Its primary focus was on issues of interest to African Americans in New York City.

The City Sun was founded by African American journalists Andrew W. Cooper and Utrice C. Leid. Cooper served as publisher and Leid as managing editor. Film critic Armond White was the arts editor.

The City Sun, whose motto was "Speaking Truth to Power", was rare among black-owned newspapers in its critical attitude toward African-American politicians. It could be unsparing in its criticism of prominent African Americans. In a front-page editorial in 1993, the newspaper advised David Dinkins, New York's first African American mayor, that he was "beginning to look like a wimp".

In 1989 The City Sun, together with the Amsterdam News, another black-owned newspaper in New York, published the name of the "Central Park jogger", Trisha Meili, who had been raped and beaten almost to death. Leid explained her decision to name the jogger by referring to an incident involving Tawana Brawley, a minor who said she had been raped, and the double standard practiced by the mainstream media:

The same media [that] had no difficulty identifying the underage Wappinger-Falls teenager [Brawley] by name [and] invading the sanctity of her home to show her face ... have been careful to avoid identifying the Central Park woman.

Cooper was recognized as Journalist of the Year by the National Association of Black Journalists in 1987 for his work at The City Sun.

In 1996, financial difficulties led Cooper to shut down The City Sun. According to The New York Times, The City Sun had a circulation of 18,500 in 1987. In 1996, when The City Sun ceased operations, The Times wrote that the newspaper's circulation could not be determined.
