= John Utendahl =

American banking executive

John Utendahl was the owner of the Utendahl Group, one of the largest African American-owned investment banking groups in the United States.

In 2010, Utendahl joined Deutsche Bank Americas as the Vice Chairman. In 2016, John Utendahl joined Bank of America as Executive Global Chairman of Corporate and Investment Banking.

== Early life and career ==
Utendahl was born in the borough of Queens in New York City and is of African American and Dutch descent. Utendahl earned a bachelor's degree in Business Administration from Long Island University, Brooklyn Campus and acquired an MBA from Columbia University.

In 2010, Utendahl sold his firm to Williams Capital Group. Utendahl is currently a minority stake-holder in Utendahl Capital Management, a small fixed income asset management firm.

On March 25, 2010, Utendahl joined Deutsche Bank Americas as Vice Chairman. After 5 years at Deutsche Bank, Utendahl left to join Bank of America as Executive Vice Chairman in 2016.

In 2022, John Utendahl became Global Chairman of Bank of America.
