= Princeton University School of Engineering and Applied Science =

School in New Jersey, US

Coordinates: 40.350550°N 74.651544°W

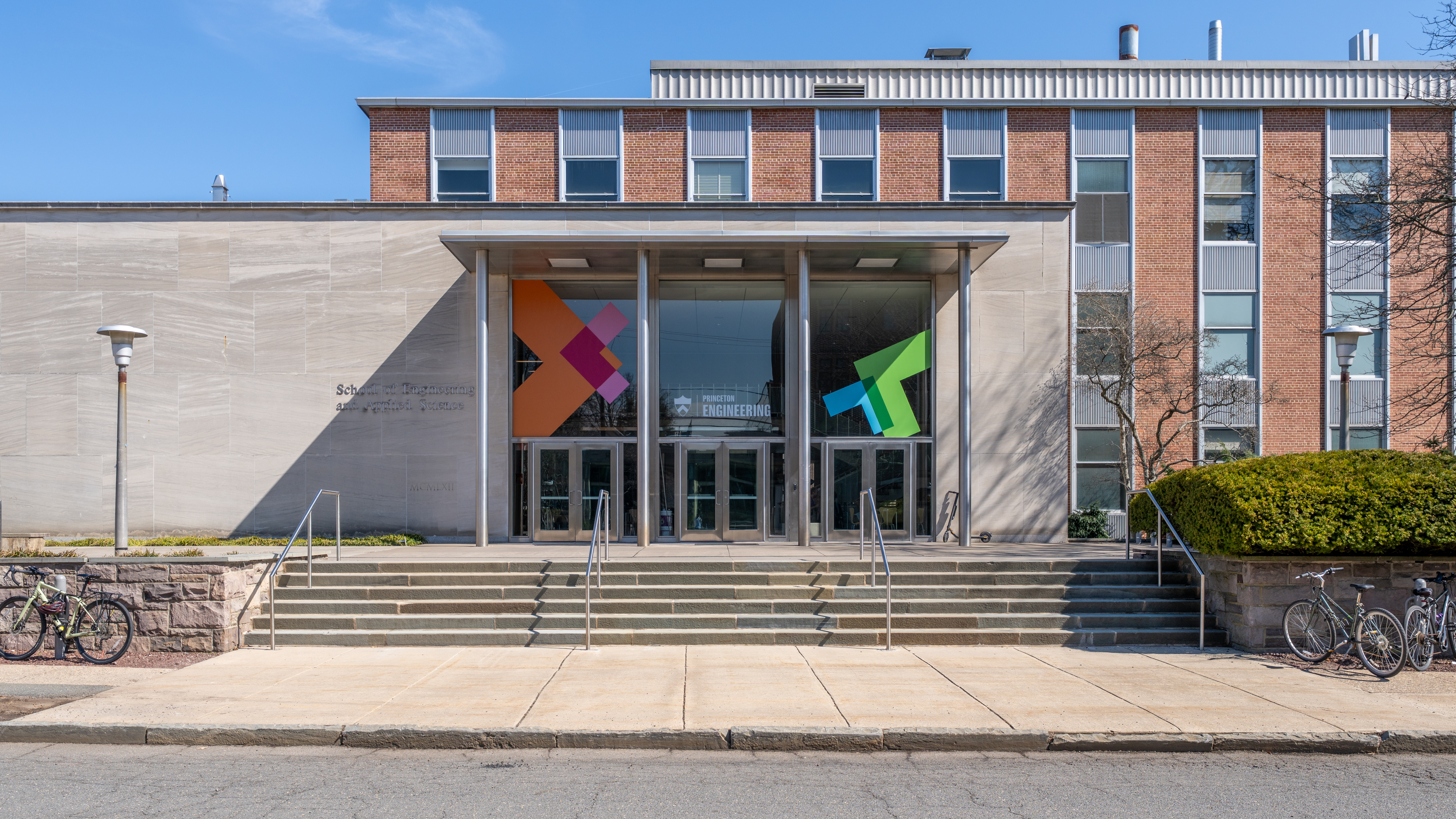
- Type: Private engineering school
- Established: 1921
- Dean: Andrew Houck
- Faculty: 145
- Students: 1950
- Undergraduates: 1335
- Postgraduates: 615
- Location: Princeton, New Jersey, USA
- Website: engineering.princeton.edu

The Princeton University School of Engineering and Applied Science (branded as Princeton Engineering) is the engineering school of Princeton University, a private research university in Princeton, New Jersey, United States. The school provides undergraduate and graduate instruction in six departments: chemical and biological engineering, civil and environmental engineering, computer science, electrical engineering, mechanical and aerospace engineering, and operations research and financial engineering. It has more than 1,400 undergraduates, 620 graduate students and 147 faculty members in its six departments.

The School of Engineering is home to four interdisciplinary centers: the Andlinger Center for Energy and the Environment, the Center for Information Technology Policy, the Keller Center for Innovation in Engineering Education, and the Princeton Materials Institute (PMI).

In 2019, Times Higher Education ranked Princeton seventh among engineering schools worldwide.

== History ==
On August 25, 1875, Princeton's Board of Trustees elected Charles McMilllan as chair of civil engineering, the University's first engineering department. Early engineering students were taught in the John C. Green School of Science, which opened in 1873. The School of Engineering and Applied Science was created to house Princeton's engineering departments in 1921.

== Campus ==
The core of Princeton's School of Engineering is the Engineering Quadrangle, known as the EQuad. Built in 1962, it was designed by Frank Voorhees of Voorhees, Walker, Smith, Smith and Haines.

Since then the Engineering School's presence on campus has expanded to include the Friend Center for Engineering Education, designed by Henry N. Cobb of Pei Cobb Freed & Partners; Bowen Hall, designed by Alan Chimacoff of the Hillier Group; the Department of Computer Science, designed by Kliment & Halsband; Sherrerd Hall, designed by Frederick Fisher and Partners; and the Andlinger Center for Energy and the Environment, designed by Tod Williams Billie Tsien Architects.

== Notable alumni and faculty ==
Notable graduates of Princeton's School of Engineering and Applied Science include Amazon CEO and founder Jeff Bezos, Google executive Eric Schmidt, former Environmental Protection Agency administrator Lisa P. Jackson, former director of the National Transportation Safety Board Christopher A. Hart, MacArthur "genius" grant winner John Dabiri, Smule founder Ge Wang, internet pioneer Bob Kahn, computer scientist Brian Kernighan, aerospace titan Norman Augustine, Chrysler maverick Lee Iacocca, SanDisk founder Eli Harari, and astronauts James Adamson, Daniel T. Barry, Brian Binnie, Gerald Carr, Charles "Pete" Conrad, and Gregory Linteris. Alan Mathison Turing, the father of computer science, received his Ph.D. from Princeton in mathematics before the discipline of computer science existed. Francis J. Doyle III, the dean of Harvard's School of Engineering and Applied Sciences, graduated from Princeton with a B.S.E. in Chemical Engineering in 1985.

Prominent faculty include MacArthur "genius" grant recipients Claire Gmachl, Naomi Leonard and Theodore Zoli, Nobel laureate Daniel C. Tsui, and computer security expert Edward Felten. Among those who were Princeton SEAS faculty include Oscar award winner Pat Hanrahan and Waterman award winner Mung Chiang.

== See also ==
- Higher education in New Jersey
- John C. Green School of Science
