= South Congregational Church (Springfield, Massachusetts) =

Historic church in Massachusetts, United States

- U.S. National Register of Historic Places
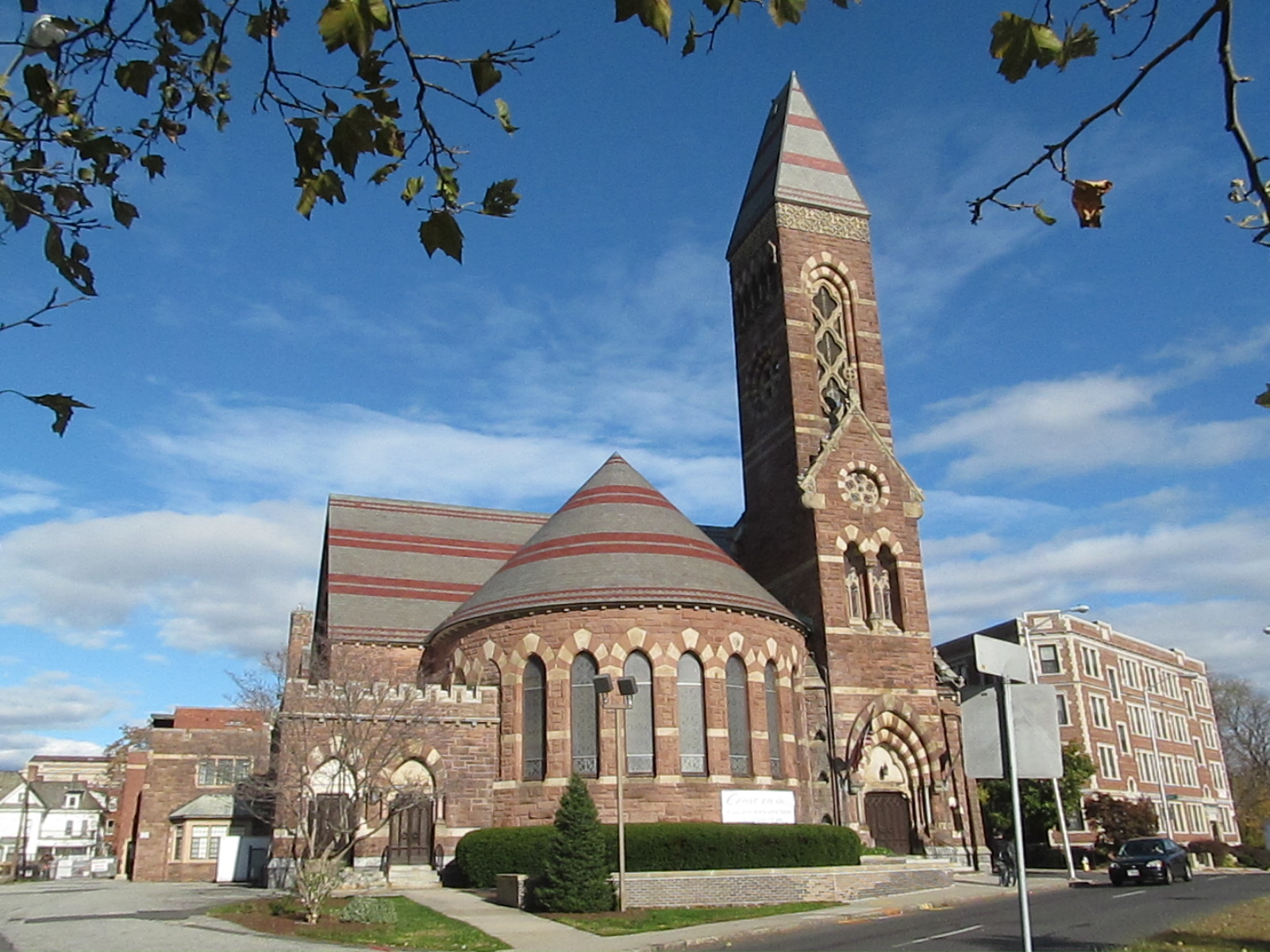
- South Congregational Church

- Location within Massachusetts Location within the United States
- Location: Springfield, Massachusetts
- Coordinates: 42°6′8″N 72°35′1″W
- Built: 1875
- Architect: William Appleton Potter
- Architectural style: Gothic
- NRHP reference No.: 76000245
- Added to NRHP: April 30, 1976

The South Congregational Church is a historic church at 45 Maple Street in Springfield, Massachusetts. The 1875 High Victorian Gothic building was designed by William Appleton Potter for a congregation that was established in 1842, and is still active today. The building is also noted for some prominent donors who funded its construction, notably Daniel B. Wesson (of Smith & Wesson fame), Charles and George Merriam (of Merriam-Webster fame), and Daniel Harris, who owned and capitalized on the Howe truss patent for bridge design.

The church is one of Potter's early works, predating the extensive work he did for the United States government. The church was described in contemporary writing as "a rather bold departure" from normal church design of the period. The church is 136 feet (41 m) long and 77 feet (23 m) wide, and is made of limestone (quarried in Longmeadow) resting on a granite foundation (quarried in Monson). The rounded apse faces Maple street, and is topped by a conical roof with red banding in the slate roof. The apse has nine windows with Gothic arches shaped of alternating light and dark stone. To its right is a tower, which rises 120 feet (37 m) above the main entrance to the building. The tower is richly decorated with arched windows and yellow Ohio sandstone banding. There is a second entrance at the northwest end (the far end of the nave) that was originally similar in styling to the front entrance, but was later enlarged and given more ornate detailing.

The interior was designed, uniquely for the time, to provide unobstructed views of the pulpit area from pews located in the transepts of the building. This gave the interior a sense of resemblance to an amphitheatre. The interior also contains decorations in themes drawn from nature, notably seasonal decorations in the tower entrance.

A parish house was added to the east side of the church in the 1940s. Built of brick, it was faced with limestone that was quarried in Longmeadow at about the same time as that of the church itself. It was recovered from the First Baptist Church prior to its demolition. The church was listed on the National Register of Historic Places in 1976.

== See also ==
- National Register of Historic Places listings in Springfield, Massachusetts
- National Register of Historic Places listings in Hampden County, Massachusetts
