= Advent Lutheran Church (New York City) =

Church in Manhattan, New York

Coordinates: 40°47′33.77″N 73°58′21.84″W

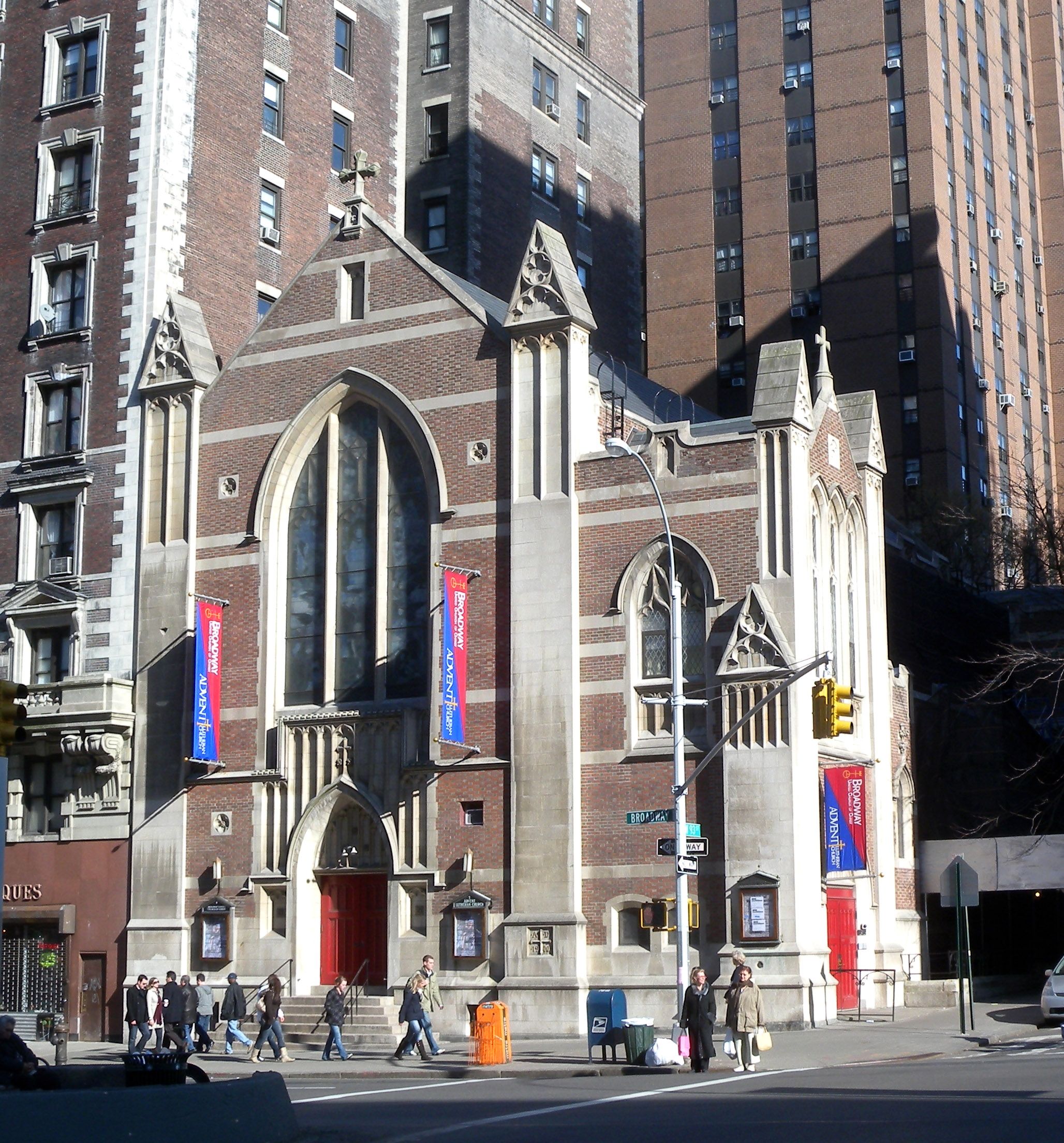

General information
- Architectural style: Gothic Revival architecture
- Location: New York, New York, United States of America
- Construction started: 1900
- Completed: 1900
- Cost: $70,000
- Client: Evangelical Lutheran Church of the Advent of 634 Park Ave

Technical details
- Structural system: brick and stone masonry, slate roof

Design and construction
- Architect: William Appleton Potter of 160 Fifth Ave

Advent Lutheran Church is a church affiliated with the Evangelical Lutheran Church in America located on the Upper West Side of Manhattan, New York City. The church building was designed by the architectural firm of William Appleton Potter (1842–1909).

== Description ==
The church is a double-height brick and stone structure over a basement. It has a pitched slate roof, and is notable in having all of its stained glass in the nave and clerestory designed by Louis Comfort Tiffany and manufactured by his Tiffany Studios, which was also responsible for the ceramic mosaic behind the altar, the sanctuary lamps, the pews, and the painted decorative organ frontal pipes in the front of the sanctuary. The nave and clerestory windows, which feature St. Paul preaching at Athens and Christ returning in glory with angels, breaking swords beneath them and ushering in a reign of peace.

== Tiffany windows restoration campaign ==
The Tiffany windows restoration campaign, titled "Shining God's Light - the Tiffany Windows Project", has been ongoing since 2007, raising funds for a one-million-dollar complete restoration of all the Tiffany windows.

== Social programs ==
Advent Lutheran runs two large food assistance programs: a monthly food pantry on the first Saturday of each month and a monthly Community Lunch program on the fourth Saturday of each month. Both are free and open to anyone in need.
