= Squibb Park Bridge =

Bridge in Brooklyn, New York

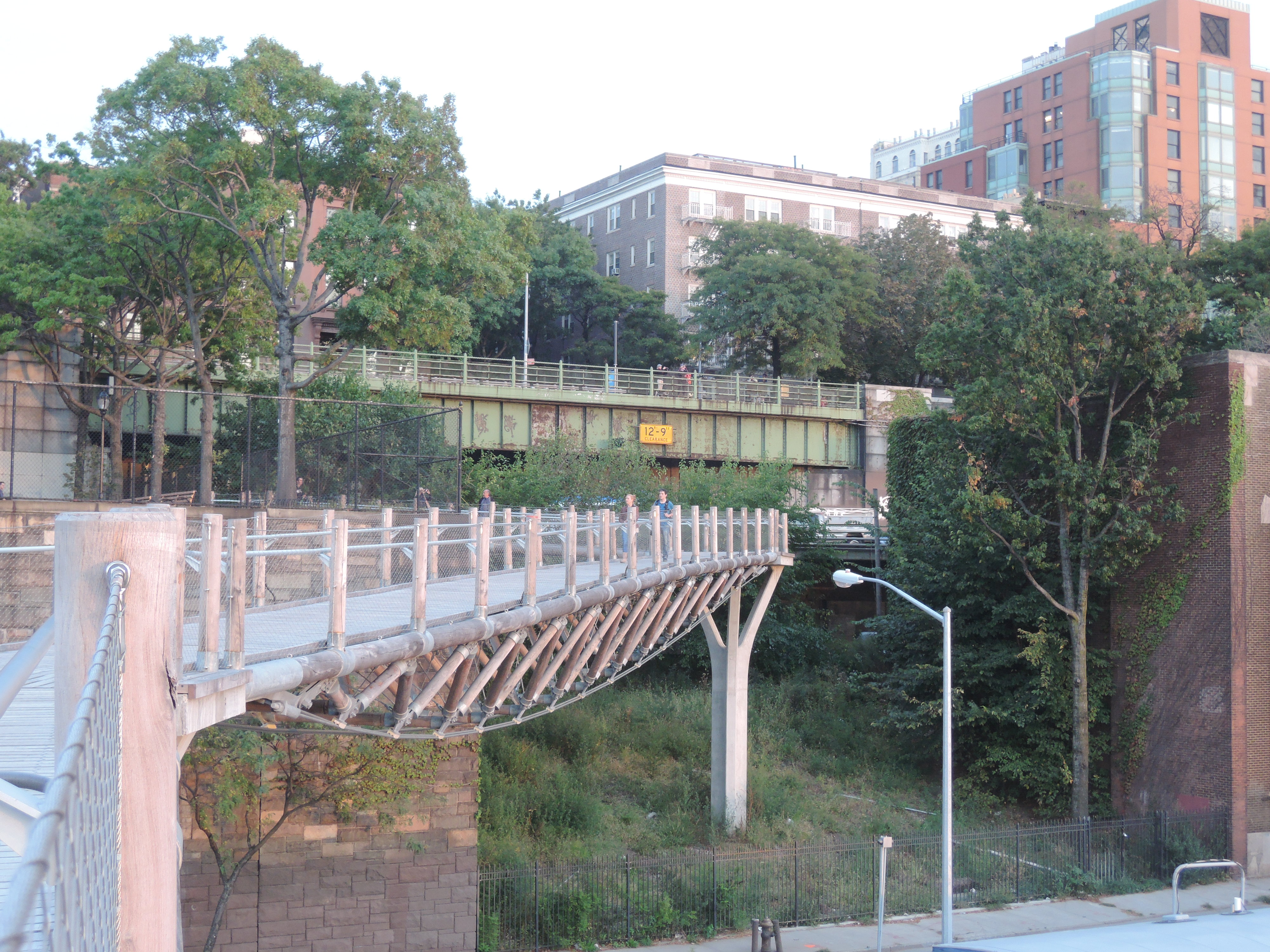
- Squibb Park Bridge in 2013
- Coordinates: 40°42′04″N 73°59′47″W
- Carries: Pedestrians
- Crosses: Furman Street
- Locale: Brooklyn Bridge Park/Brooklyn Heights, Brooklyn, New York City

Characteristics
- Design: Underspanned suspension bridge (2013), Inverted truss bridge (2020)
- Material: Black locust wood, galvanized cable
- Total length: 400 feet (120 m)
- Clearance below: 50 feet (15 m)

History
- Architect: Theodore Zoli
- Construction start: December 2012
- Construction end: March 2013
- Opened: March 2013
- Closed: mid-2018 (closure); October 2019 (demolition)
- Replaced by: New Squibb Park Bridge (2020)

Location
- Interactive map of Squibb Park Bridge

Squibb Park Bridge is a footbridge connecting Brooklyn Bridge Park and Squibb Park in Brooklyn Heights in Brooklyn, New York City. It is the second of two bridges on the same site. The original bridge opened in March 2013 and was demolished in late 2019, being replaced by the current bridge in April 2020. It is named after inventor and manufacturer of pharmaceutics E. R. Squibb.

The original structure, designed by Theodore Zoli, became known as a boondoggle due to various problems with its construction, including too much bounce and deterioration of its timbers. The bridge initially cost $4.1 million to construct, but the cost of repairs ultimately ended up making the total cost $7.5 million. The current bridge, designed by Arup Group and built by Turner Construction, is made of steel.

== Original bridge ==
HNTB Corporation, the engineering firm of Theodore Zoli, was contracted to build the bridge by the Brooklyn Bridge Park Corporation. The bridge was announced in April 2012 and was constructed from December 2012 to March 2013. Its purpose was to let people travel from Brooklyn Bridge Park's Pier 1 to the Brooklyn Heights Promenade and Squibb Park. Built from black locust timber supported by galvanized steel cables and mounted on concrete pillars, it was meant to have some degree of bounce when people walked across, based on catwalks found in state parks. The wooden design was meant to be a "stepping stone" for sustainable vehicular bridges in rural areas.

=== Structural concerns and demolition ===
The bounce became more pronounced over time, and the bridge also began moving from side to side in an unintended way, worrying pedestrians. The bridge was closed on August 11, 2014, for repairs due to a "misalignment", though at the time park officials expressed confidence in the bridge's design. The bridge remained closed for the next two years.

More than two years after this closing, park officials determined that the bridge's design was "inherently flawed" and filed suit against the bridge's designers. The park spent $3.4 million on repairs to the bridge, including dampers to reduce the bounciness. The lawsuit was settled for $1.95 million with no admission of wrongdoing. The bridge reopened in April 2017, but was closed again in mid-2018 after the wood had started deteriorating significantly. Despite the wood being "extremely rot-resistant", testing later discovered that "higher than expected moisture levels" compromised its condition and quality. Retrofitting the bridge would have cost almost the same as rebuilding it, in addition to maintenance costs. The original bridge was almost entirely demolished in October 2019, with the exception of the concrete support structures, which were retained for use in its rebuilding.

== New bridge ==
A steel replacement was designed by Arup and constructed by Turner. The steel replica was initially expected to be completed by December 2020. It was completed ahead of schedule in April 2020, and opened to the public on May 4, 2020.

== Reception ==
Mary Frost of The Brownstoner called the original Squibb Park Bridge a "crowd-pleasing but ultimately dysfunctional structure".
