= St. Agnes Chapel (New York City) =

Demolished church in Manhattan, New York

Coordinates: 40.7906°N 73.9717°W

The Former Episcopal Chapel of St. Agnes
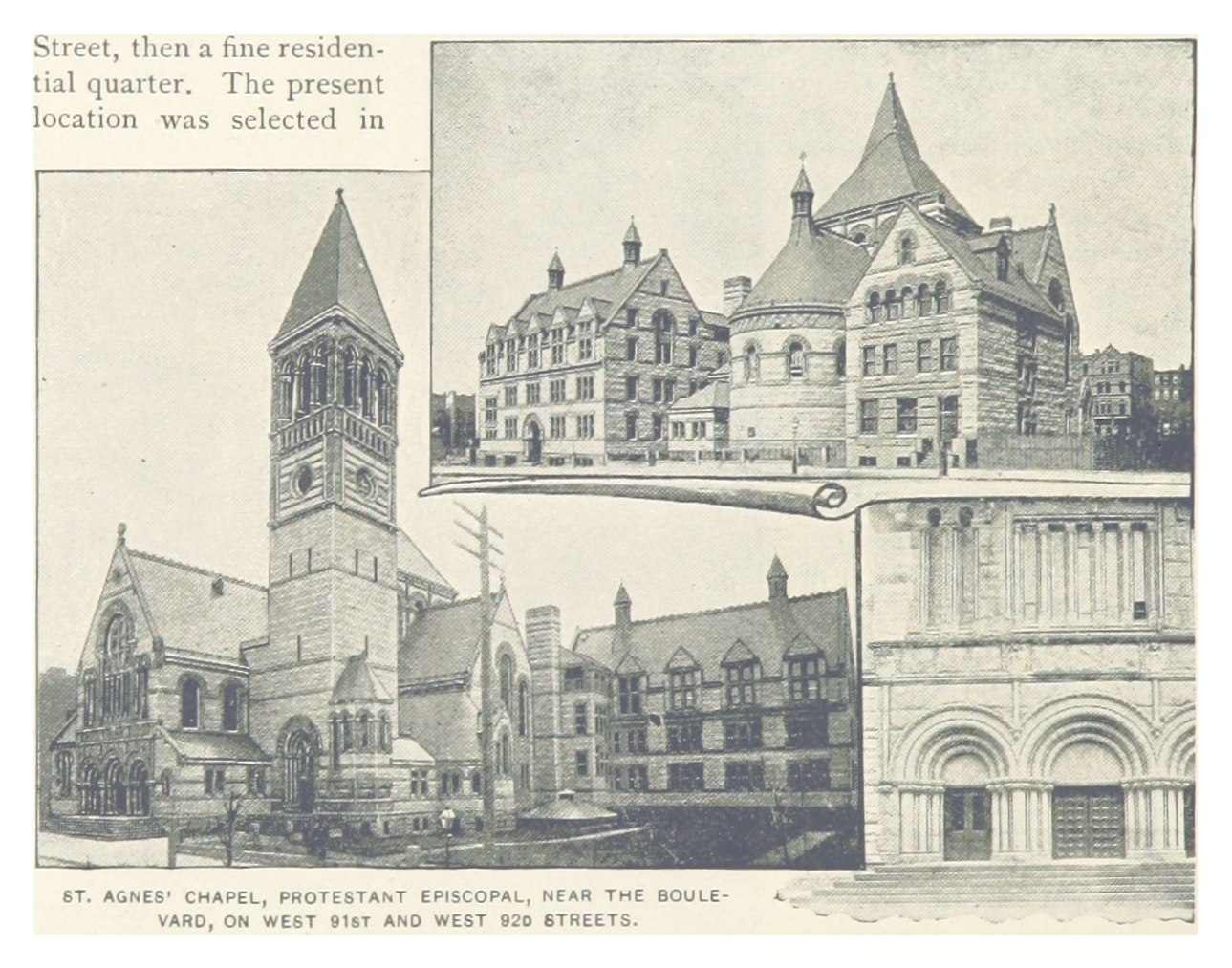
- Interactive map of the The Former Episcopal Chapel of St. Agnes area

General information
- Architectural style: Romanesque Revival
- Location: New York, New York, United States of America
- Construction started: 1890
- Completed: 1892
- Demolished: 1943
- Client: The Episcopal Church in the United States

Technical details
- Structural system: Limestone masonry

Design and construction
- Architect: William Appleton Potter

St. Agnes Chapel was an Upper West Side Episcopal "plant chapel" of Trinity Church (New York City), one of many. It was located at 121-147 West 91st Street, between Amsterdam and Columbus Avenues. It was at first reused by its parish school and then demolished for a gymnasium in the 1940s.

Like many large buildings in the 19th century, St. Agnes Chapel was the product of an architectural competition. In July 1888, Trinity Corporation announced a competition to design the chapel, a clergy house, and a parish house. The corporation invited six architects: Charles C. Haight, Henry M. Congdon, Frederick C. Withers, Richard M. Hunt, William Halsey Wood, and McKim Mead & White, each of whom received $1,000 compensation. However, other architects were invited to submit designs with the understanding that they would be paid if chosen. In the end, the jury selected a submission by the architect William Appleton Potter, a son of the Episcopal Bishop Alonzo Potter.

The three buildings were built between 1890 and 1892 to the designs of architect Potter. The New York Times described the chapel as “the finest church structure, barring the cathedral, in New York City.” The chapel entrance was on West 92nd Street, whereas the parish house and clergy house, flanking the chapel's apse, were entered on West 91st Street.

In 1934, Downtown Trinity Parish decided to close the small congregation, already split from nearby Episcopal churches. Eager to expand, the adjacent parish school, also named Trinity, bought it as a gymnasium space and demolished it for a more permanent structure in 1943.

The St. Agnes Branch of the New York Public Library, now half a mile away, was founded by the parish.
