= William Appleton Potter =

American architect

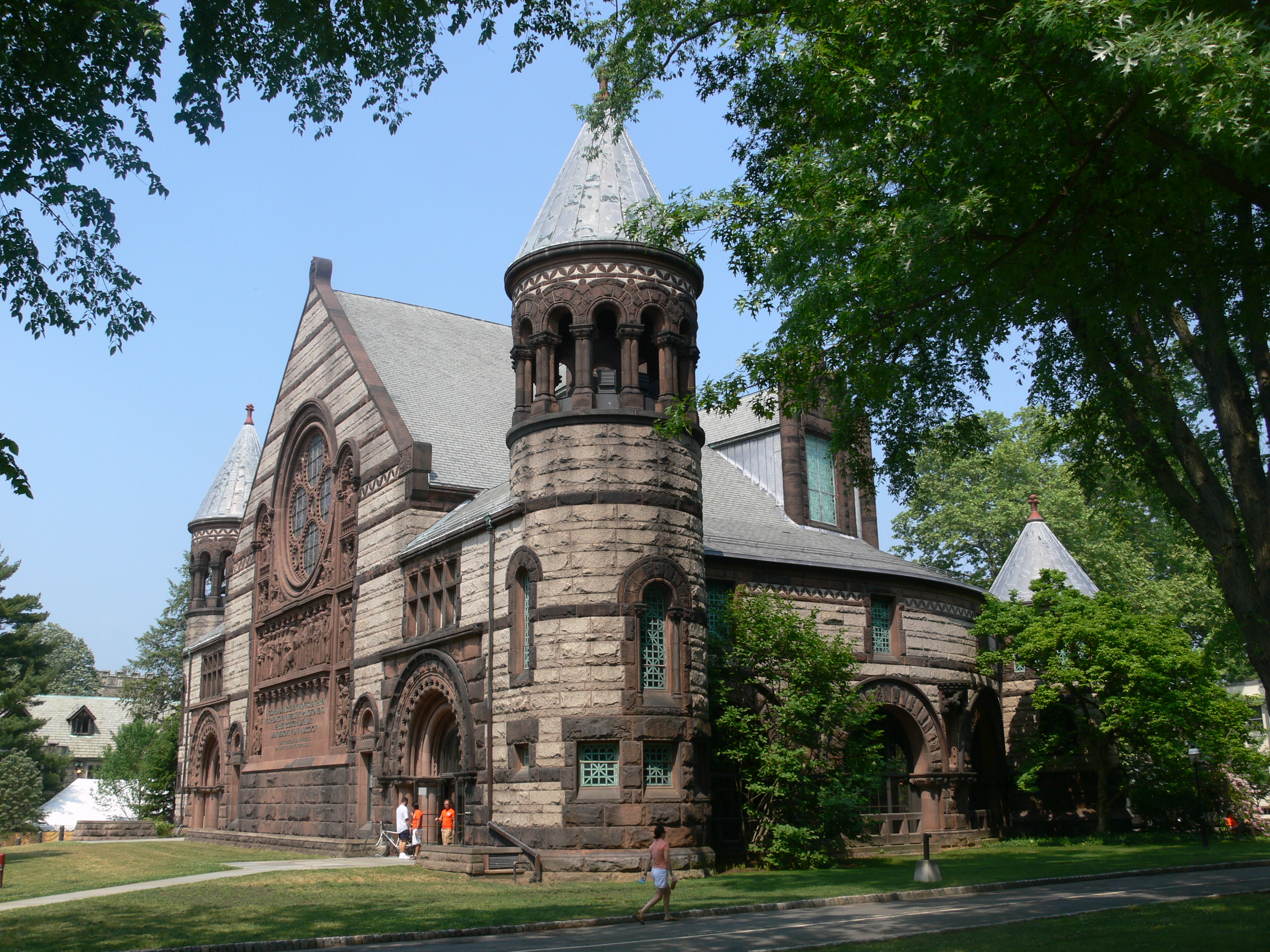
Alexander Hall, Princeton University (1891-94)

William Appleton Potter (December 10, 1842 – February 19, 1909) was an American architect who designed numerous buildings for Princeton University, as well as municipal offices and churches. He served as a Supervising Architect of the Treasury from 1874 to 1877.

== Biography ==
Born in 1842 in Schenectady, New York, Potter grew up in Philadelphia, where he attended Episcopal Academy. He then returned to his birthplace to matriculate at Union College as a member of the Class of 1864. Potter was the son of Bishop Alonzo Potter and had eight brothers, including:

- Clarkson Nott Potter (1825–1882), Democratic member of the House of Representatives after the Civil War
- Howard Potter (1826–1897) Banker, Senior Partner in Brown Shipley
- Robert Brown Potter (1829–1887), United States General in the Civil War
- Henry Codman Potter (1835–1908), succeeded Horatio Potter as Bishop of New York in 1887
- Eliphalet Nott Potter (1836–1901), professor and president of Union College and Hobart College
- Potter's half-brother Edward Tuckerman Potter (1831–1904), architect who designed the Nott Memorial at Union College

He became an assistant professor at Columbia College, where he taught chemistry for a year, after which he spent another year touring France. His collegiate background distinguished him from most architects of the first half of the 19th century, who received their training through apprenticeship in the building trades and sometimes in the offices of practicing architects. The apprenticeship tradition was still strong, however, and Potter received his professional training first in the New York office of George B. Post, and then in his half-brother's office at Schenectady.

Potter died February 19, 1909. Among his apprentices was the architect James Brown Lord.

== Career ==
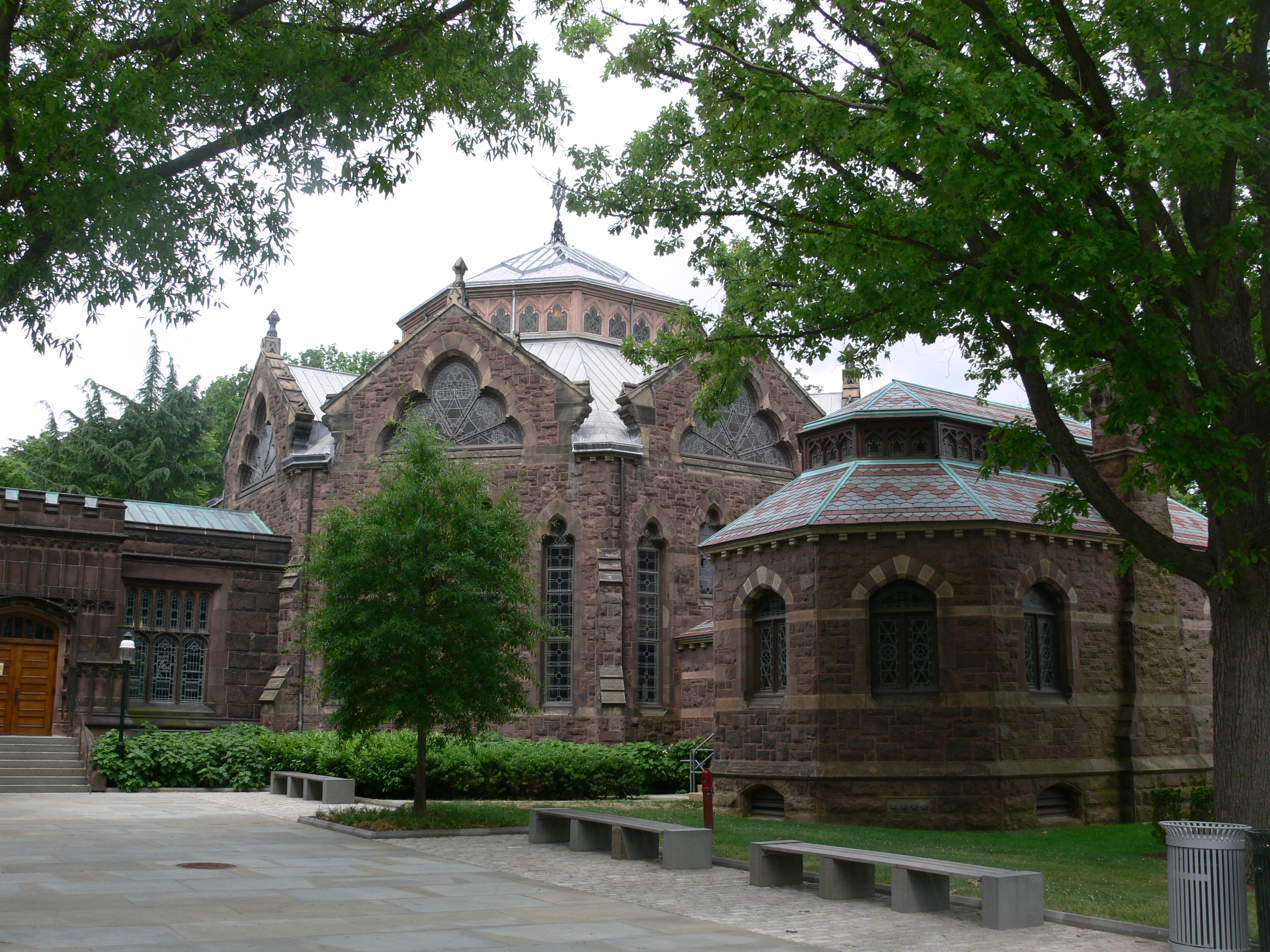
Chancellor Green Library, Princeton University (1871-73).

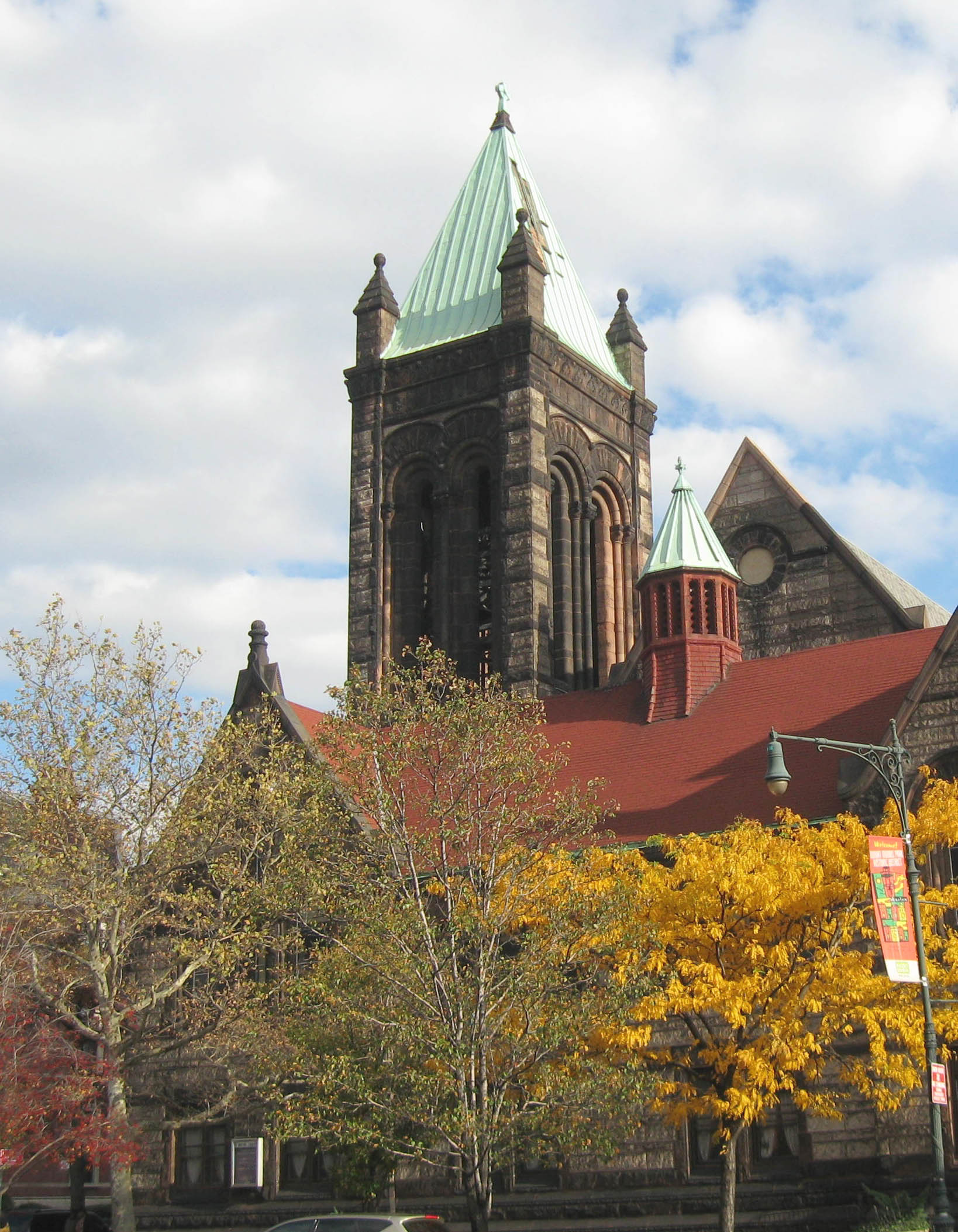
St Martin's Church, Harlem, New York City (1888).

Chancellor Green Library (1871–1873) for Princeton University was Potter's first major commission. In it, he took the High Victorian Gothic vocabulary and octagonal form used by his half-brother for the Nott Memorial at Union College, and elaborated it into a complex interplay of octagons of various sizes and shapes. For Princeton, retaining Potter represented a shift from dependence on Philadelphia architects to a New York practitioner. He would receive from the college an honorary Master of Arts degree in 1872, and go on to design several other buildings on campus.

From 1874 to 1877, Potter served as supervising architect of the United States Treasury. Under his supervision, designs were produced for customhouses, courthouses, and post offices in Kentucky, Indiana, Massachusetts, Georgia, and Tennessee.

Concurrent with his years at the U.S. Treasury, Potter formed a partnership with Robert Henderson Robertson. From 1875 to 1881, along with major public projects, the firm produced summer vacation cottages in Newport, Rhode Island, and the Jersey Shore, as well as the Adam-Derby House at Oyster Bay, New York.

== Commissions ==
- South Congregational Church, Springfield, Massachusetts (1871–1875)
- Chancellor Green Library, Princeton University (1871–1873)
- John C. Green School of Science, Princeton (1873–1875) (razed)
- Berkshire Athenaeum, Pittsfield, Massachusetts (1874–1876)
- Belleville Avenue Congregational Church, Newark, New Jersey (1874)
- Witherspoon Hall, Princeton (1875–1877)
- Stuart Hall at Princeton Theological Seminary (1875–1877)
- The University Hotel, Princeton (1875–1877, with partner Robert Henderson Robertson) (razed)
- Charles H. Baldwin House, Newport, Rhode Island (1877–78, with partner Robert Henderson Robertson)
- St. James Protestant Episcopal Chapel; known as the Church of the Presidents, Elberon, New Jersey (1879, with partner Robert Henderson Robertson)
- Trinity Episcopal Church, Shelburne, Vermont (1886-1898)
- Christ Church, Poughkeepsie, New York (1887–1889)
- St. Martin's Church, 230 Lenox Avenue (1888) (NYCL)
- St. Mary's-in-Tuxedo Episcopal Church, Tuxedo Park, New York (1888)
- St. Agnes Chapel, New York City (1890–1892; razed 1944)
- Alexander Hall, Princeton (1891–1894)
- Church of St. Paul & St. Andrew, 236 West 86th Street (1895)
- First Reformed Dutch church, Somerville, New Jersey (1896–1897)
- East Pyne Building, Princeton (1896–1897)
- Church of the Divine Paternity (Fourth Universalist Society in the City of New York), 160 Central Park West (1898)
- Advent Lutheran Church (New York City) (1900)
- Townhouse, 33 East 67th Street, New York, New York (1903)
- St. John's Episcopal Church, Stamford, Connecticut (1891)
- Massena House, Barrytown, New York (1886)

== Greenwich Point ==
Potter was the uncle of Mrs. J. Kennedy Tod (Maria Howard Potter) daughter of Howard Potter, and in 1887 Potter designed Innis Arden House and several other buildings for Mr. and Mrs. Tod's Greenwich, Connecticut estate, known as Innis Arden. Today the 147-acre (0.59 km^{2}) estate is a public park in Greenwich, known as Greenwich Point. Several original buildings designed by Potter remain on the property, including the Old Barn (circa 1887), which is the oldest extant building at Greenwich Point and was fully restored by the Greenwich Point Conservancy 2016. In addition, the Innis Arden Cottage, which was designed by an associate of Potter, Katherine C. Budd, an early and prominent woman and architect, remains on the property as well. The 1903 Innis Arden Cottage was completely restored by the Greenwich Point Conservancy between 2005 - 2011. Both the Old Barn and the Innis Arden Cottage are open to the public.

== Gallery ==
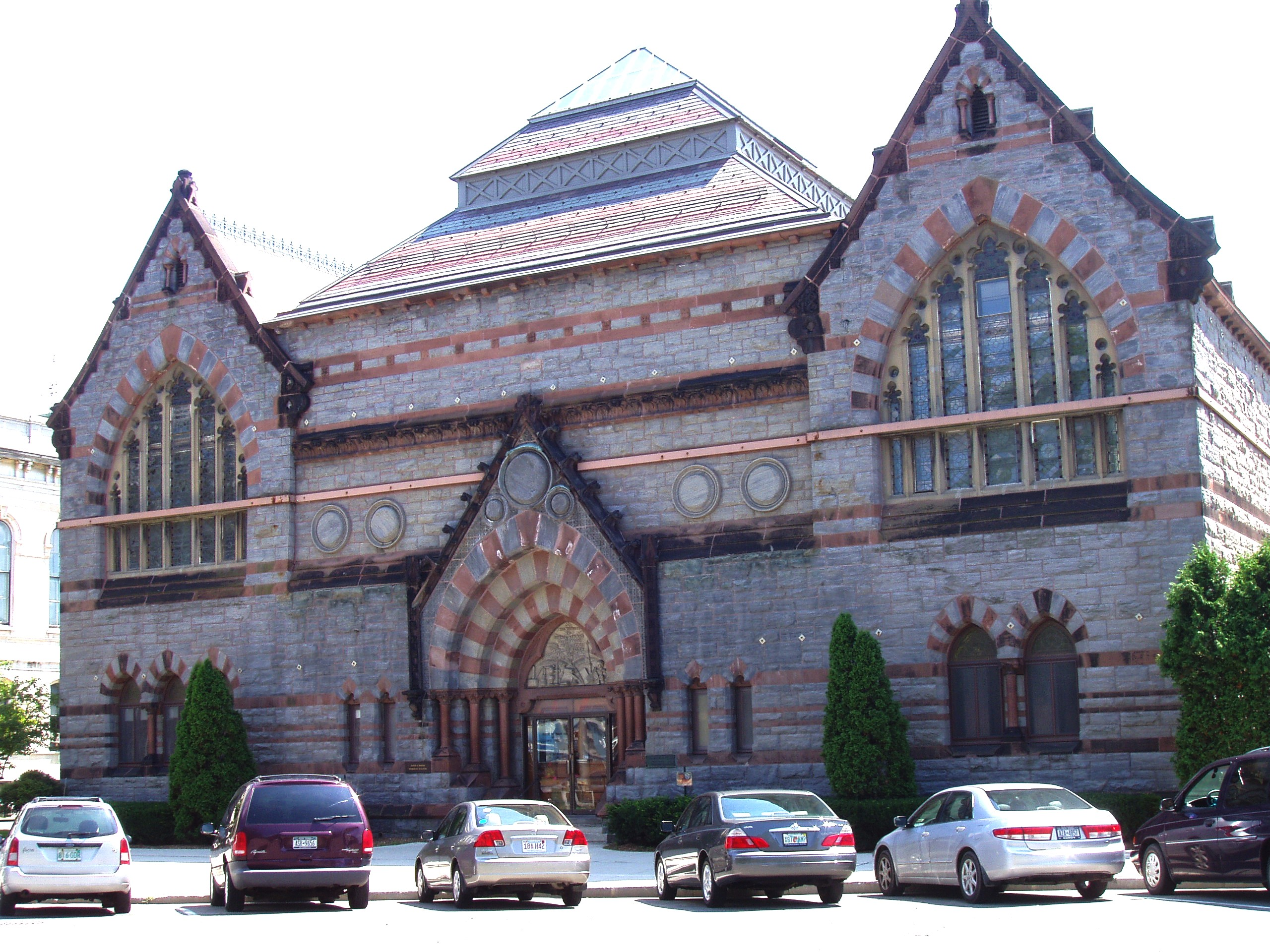
Berkshire Athenaeum, Pittsfield, Massachusetts (1874–76).

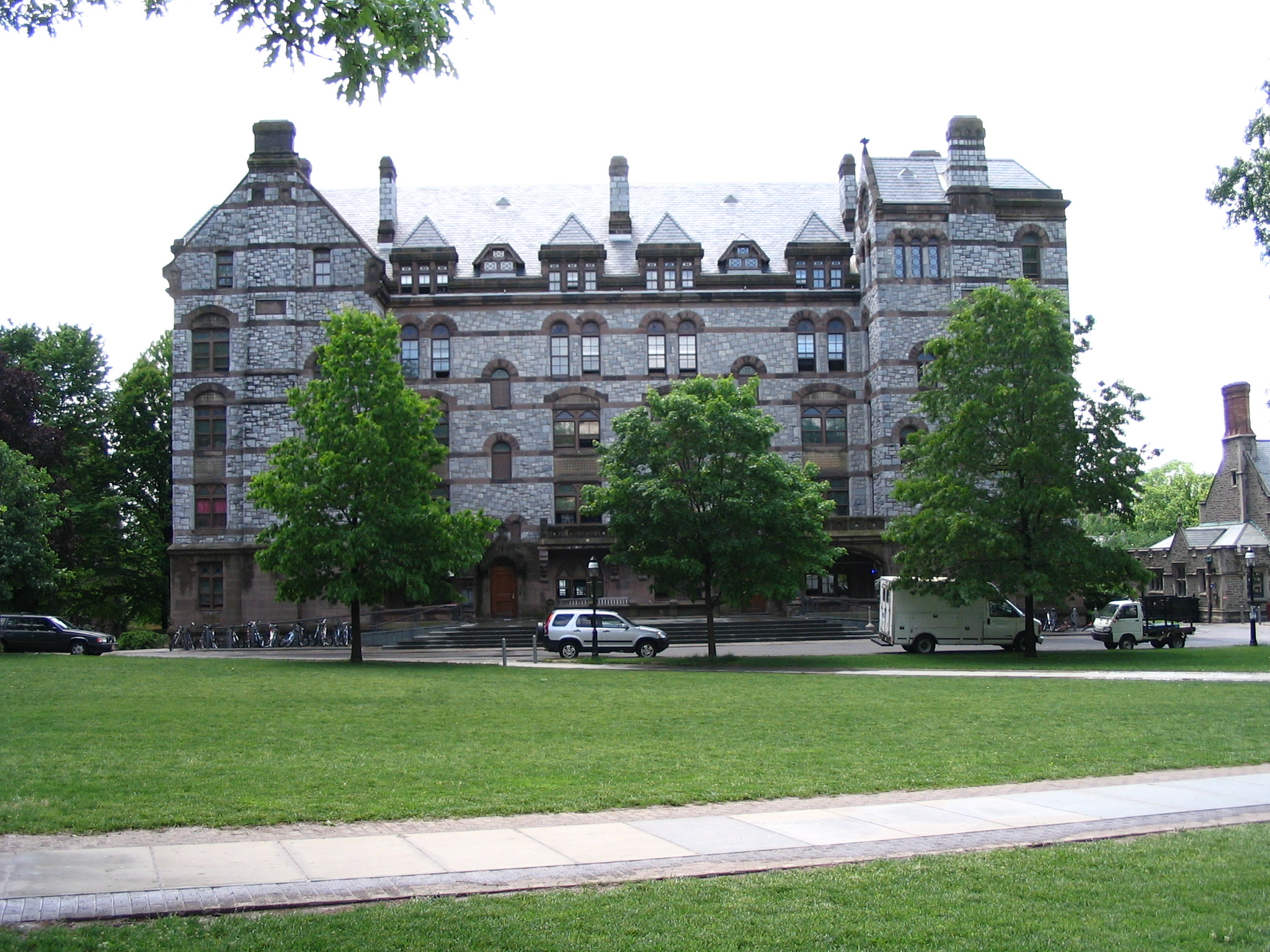
Witherspoon Hall, Princeton University (1875–77).

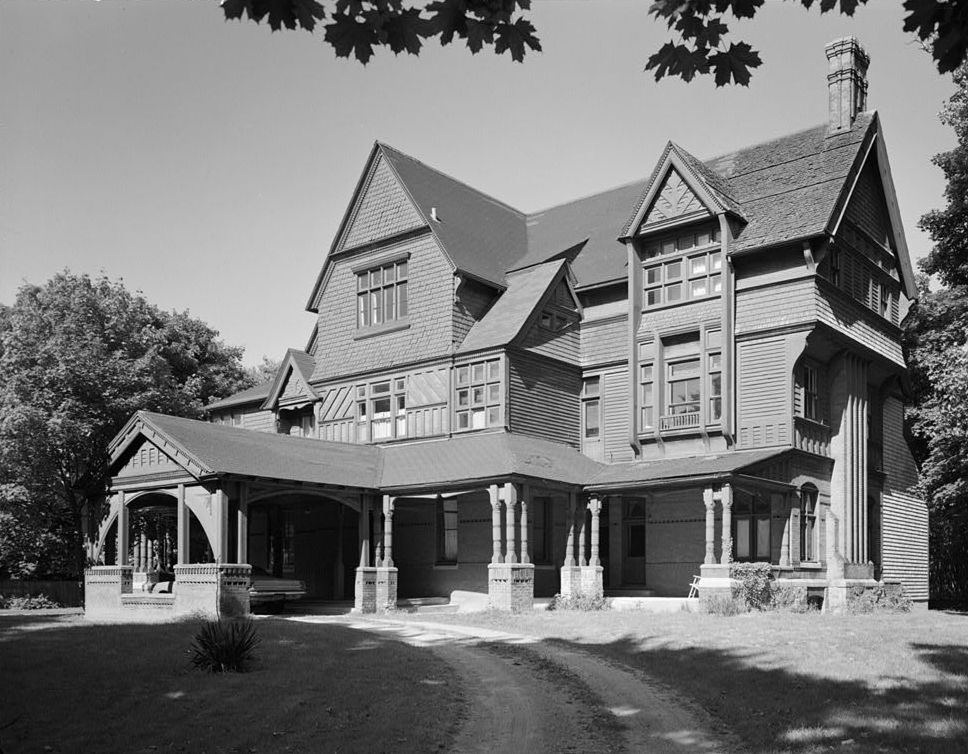
Charles H. Baldwin House, Newport, Rhode Island (1877–78), Potter & Robertson.

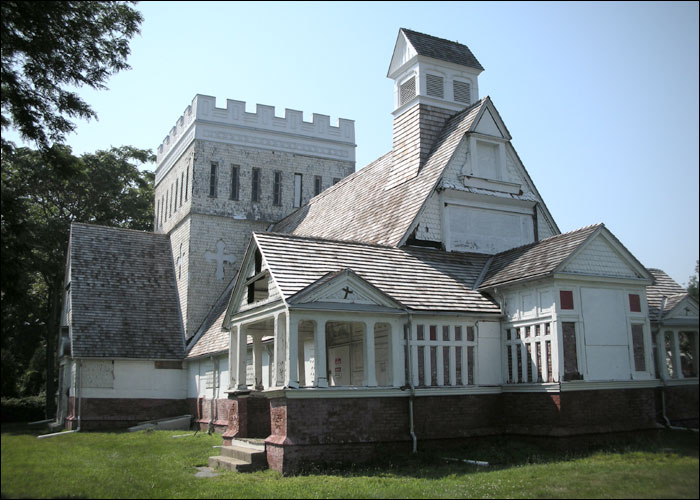
Church of the Presidents, Elberon, New Jersey (1879), Potter & Robertson.

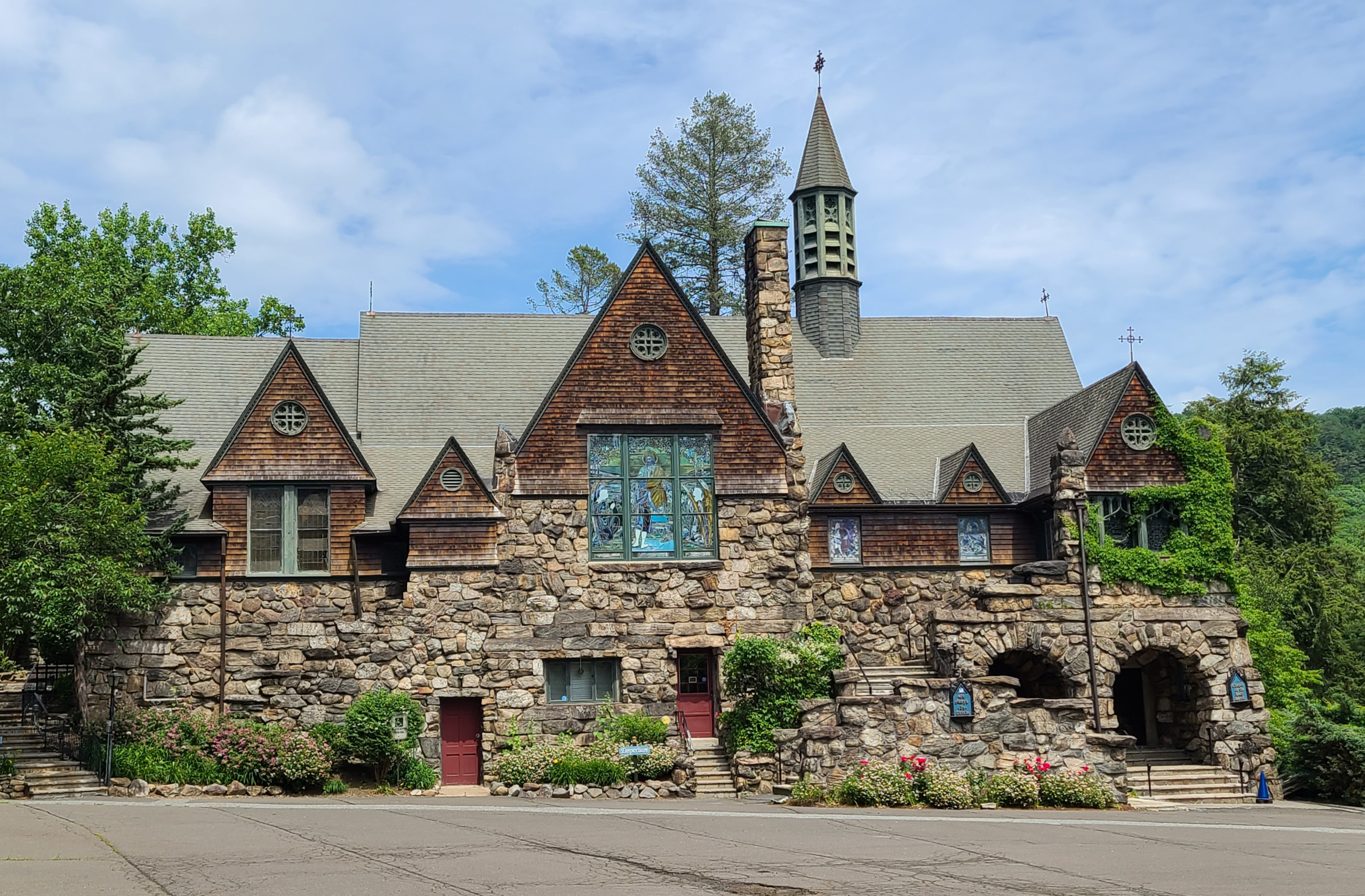
St. Mary's-in-Tuxedo Episcopal Church, Tuxedo Park, New York (1888).

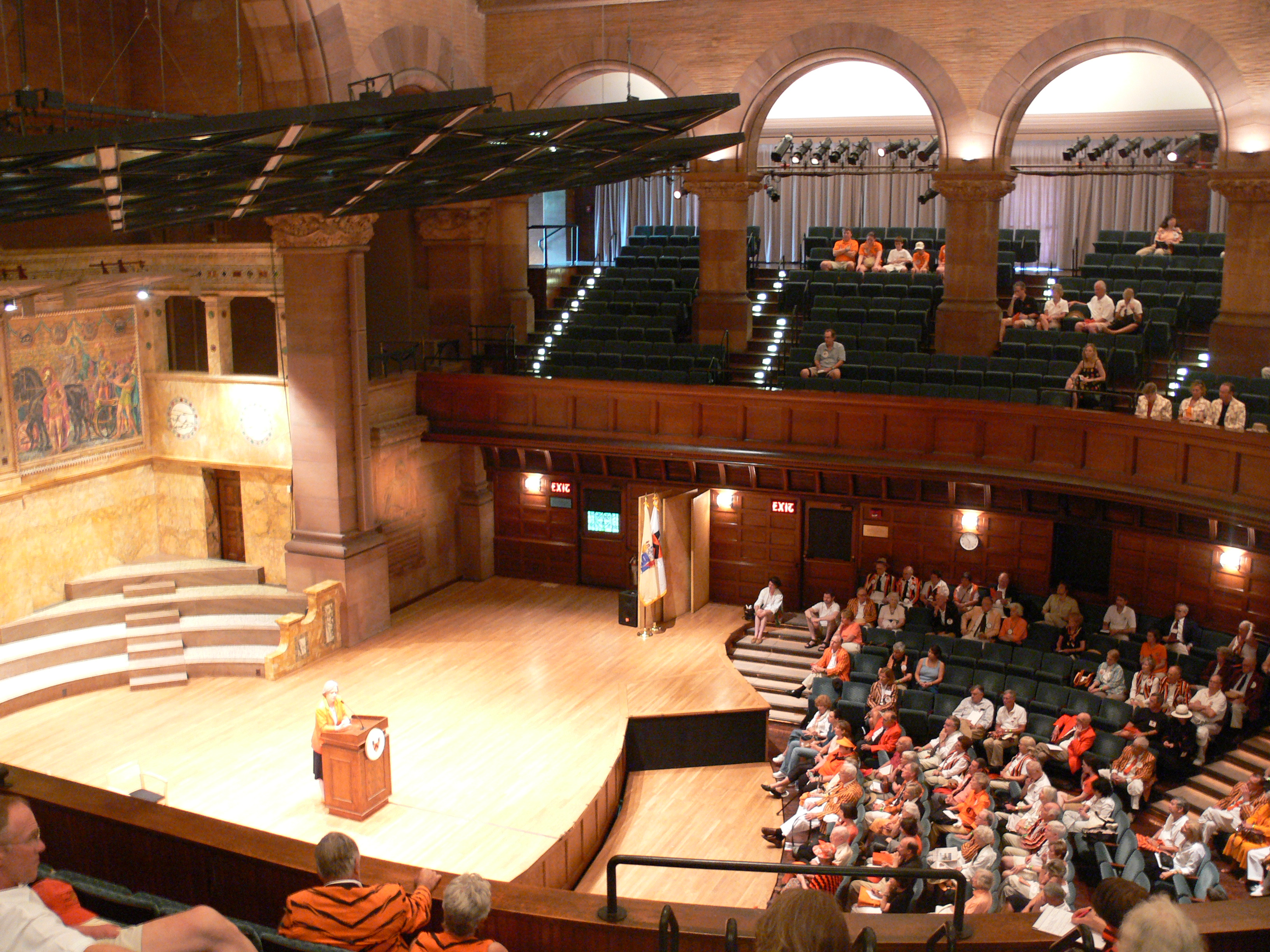
Alexander Hall, auditorium, Princeton University (1891–94).

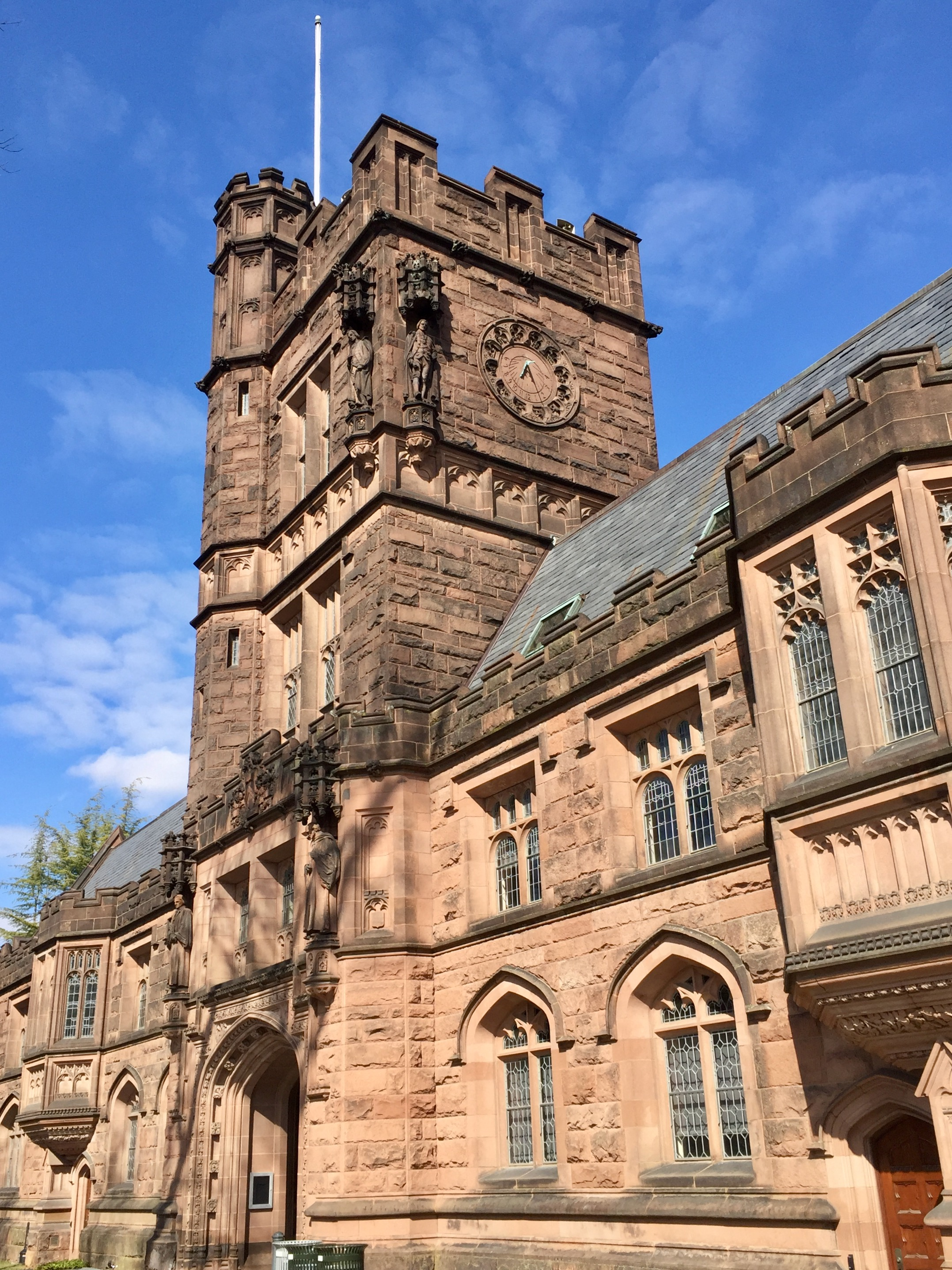
East Pyne Hall, Princeton University (1896–97).

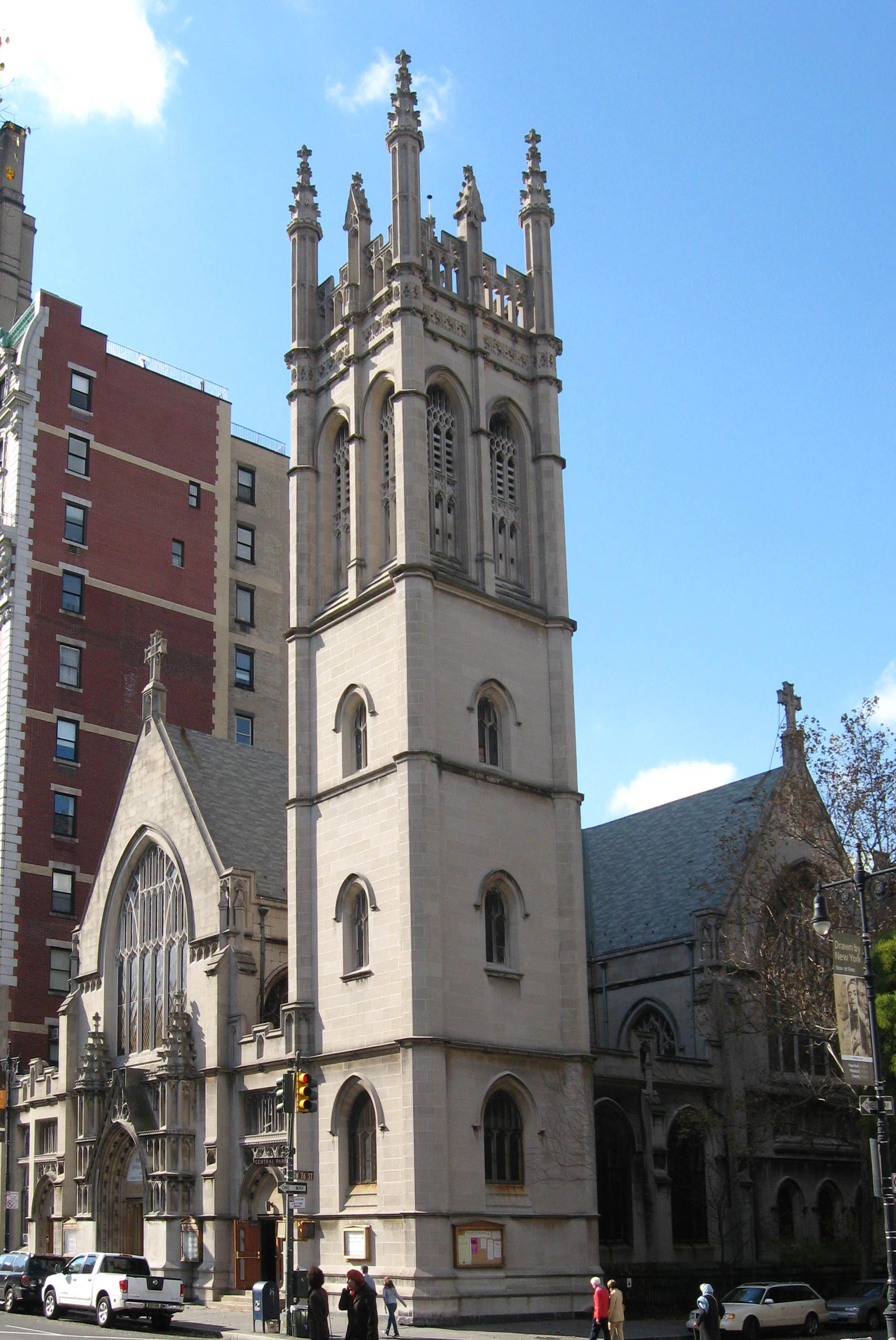
Church of the Divine Paternity (Fourth Universalist Society), New York, New York (1898).

== Notes ==
Preceded by Alfred B. Mullett	Office of the Supervising Architect; 1874–1877	Succeeded by James G. Hill
