= Belleville Avenue Congregational Church =

Historic church in New Jersey, United States

- U.S. National Register of Historic Places
- New Jersey Register of Historic Places
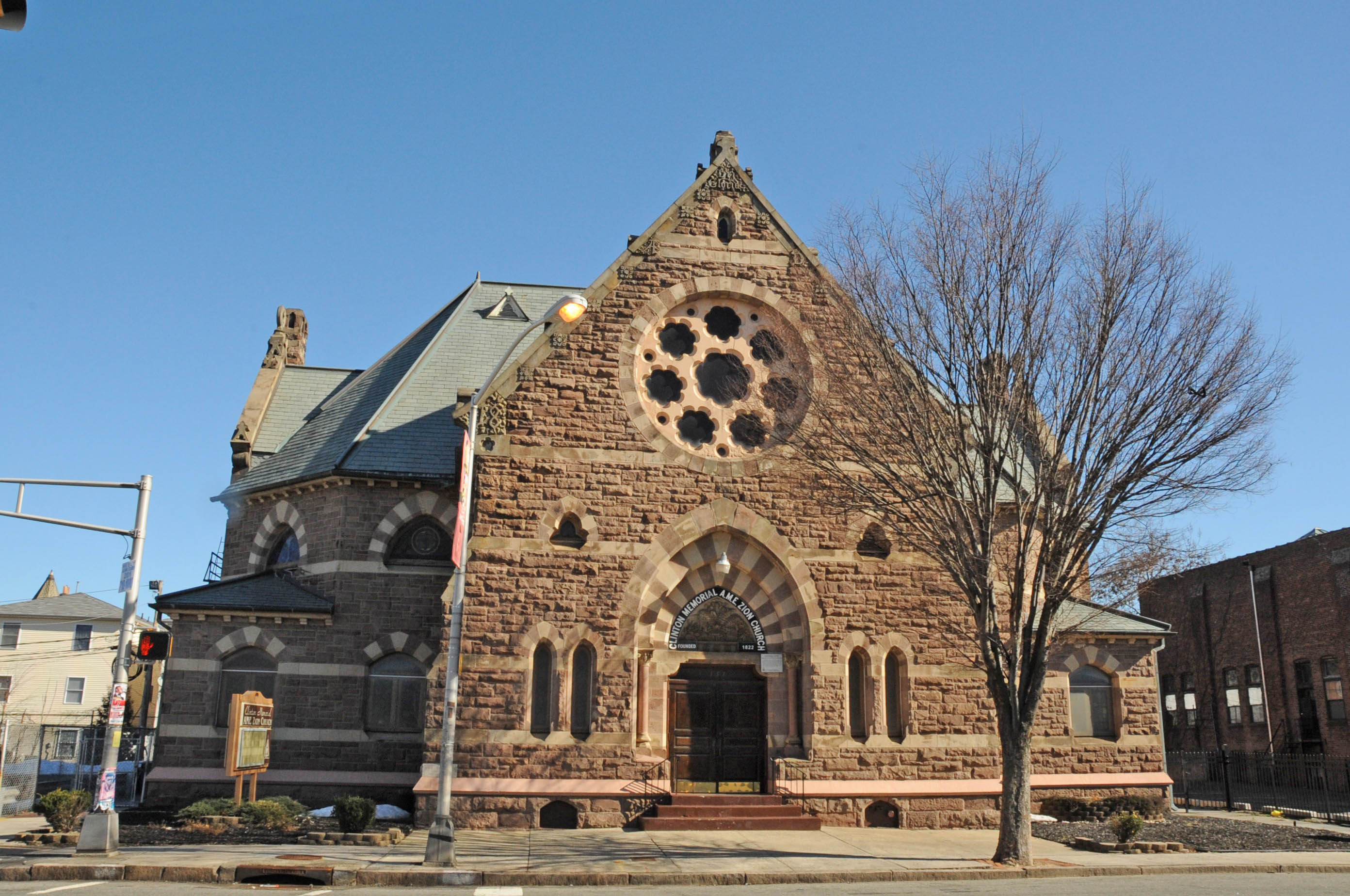

- Location within Essex County, New Jersey Location within New Jersey Location within the United States
- Location: 151 Broadway, Newark, New Jersey
- Coordinates: 40°45′20″N 74°10′11″W
- Area: less than one acre
- Built: 1874
- Architect: William Appleton Potter
- Architectural style: Gothic, High Victorian Gothic
- NRHP reference No.: 86001505
- NJRHP No.
- Added to NRHP: August 13, 1986

Belleville Avenue Congregational Church is a historic church at 151 Broadway in Newark, Essex County, New Jersey, United States.

It was built in 1874 and added to the National Register of Historic Places in 1986.

== See also ==
- National Register of Historic Places listings in Essex County, New Jersey
