= Brooklyn Heights Promenade =

Esplanade in Brooklyn, New York

Coordinates: 40.6975°N 73.9973°W

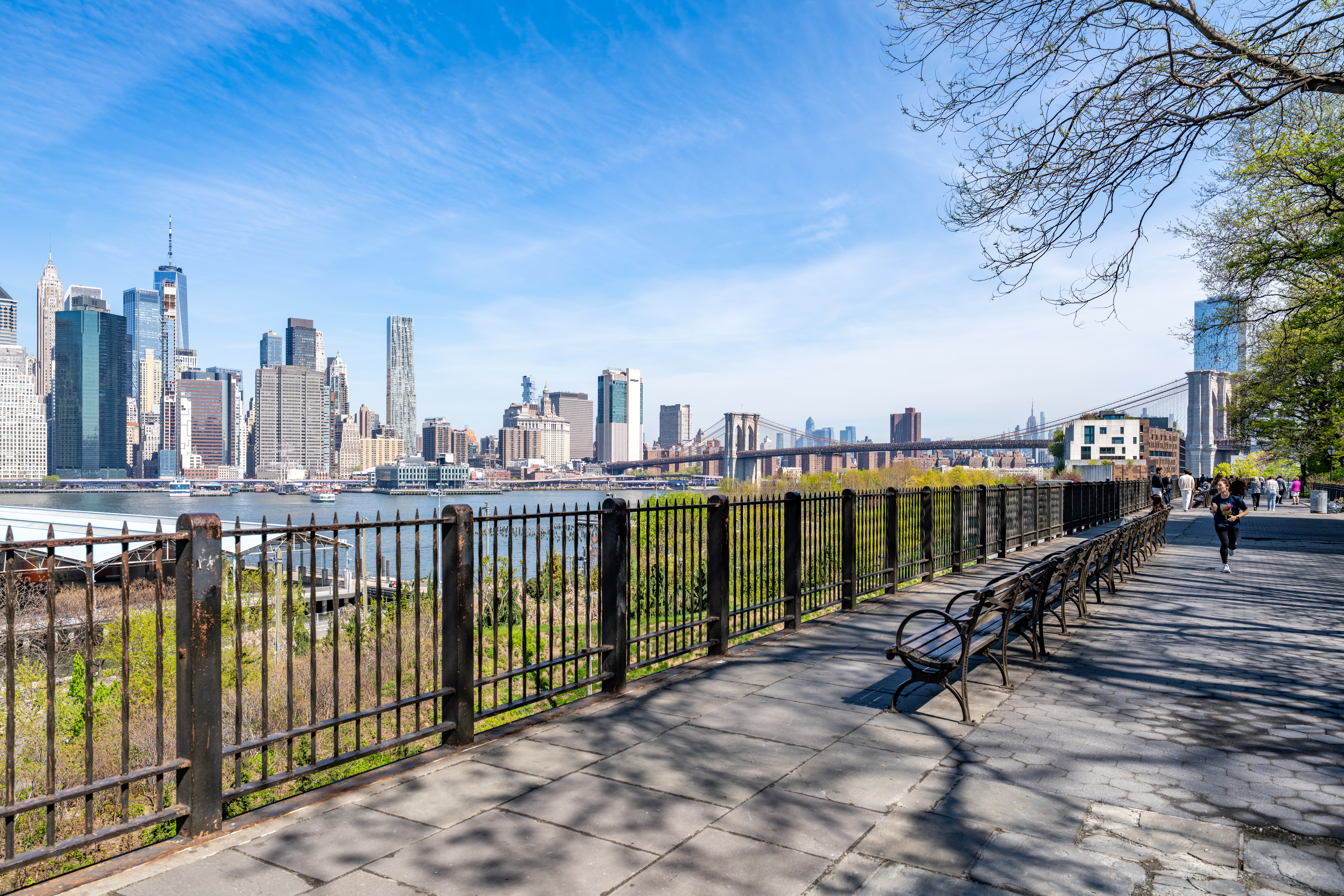
Brooklyn Heights Promenade in 2026

The Brooklyn Heights Promenade, also called the Esplanade, is a 1,826-foot-long (557 m) platform and pedestrian walkway cantilevered over the Brooklyn-Queens Expressway (Interstate 278) in Brooklyn Heights, Brooklyn, New York City, United States. With views of Lower Manhattan's skyline and the New York Harbor, it came about as the byproduct of competing proposals for the highway's route that were resolved in the midst of World War II. Actual construction came after the war. As a structure built over a roadway, the Promenade is owned by the NYCDOT and is not considered a park; however, NYC Parks maintains the entire Promenade.

The Promenade runs from the west end of Remsen Street to the west end of Orange Street and can additionally be accessed from Montague Street and Pierrepont Place and the west ends of Pierrepont Street, Clark Street and Pineapple Street.

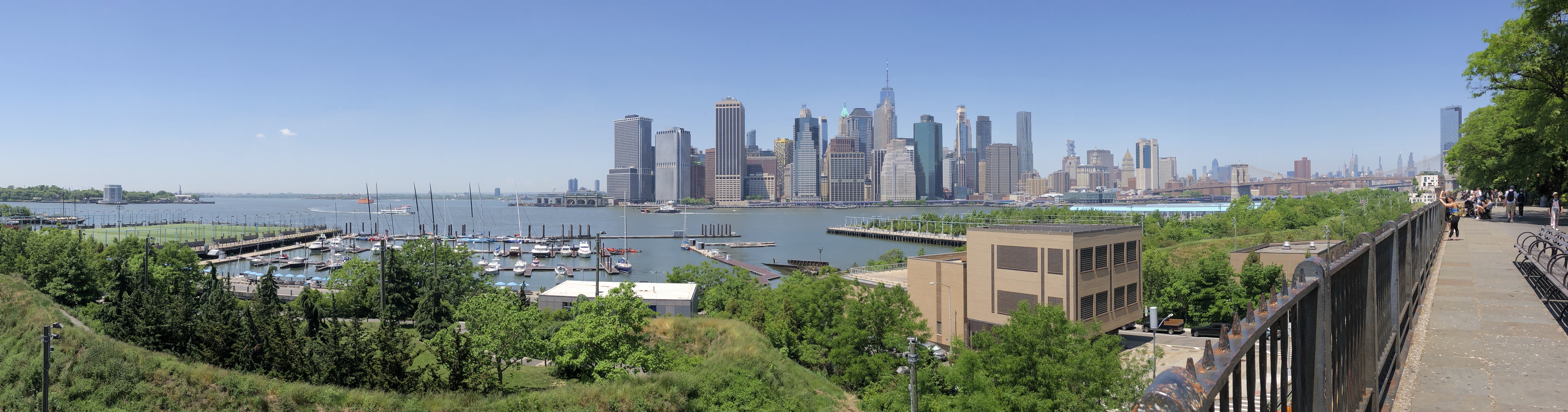
Daylight view from the Promenade in 2024

== Planning ==
The need for a Brooklyn-Queens Expressway to connect the boroughs of Brooklyn and Queens predated World War II. A link between the Gowanus Parkway in Brooklyn and the Triborough Bridge in Queens was first proposed in 1936. In 1939, a topographical engineer with New York's then new City Planning Department mapped a route for such a highway that hewed quite closely to the East River waterfront of the two boroughs.

Independently, New York City parks commissioner Robert Moses subsequently envisioned a somewhat more inland route. A proposal by Moses in 1941 to run the Brooklyn–Queens Expressway through the neighborhood was successfully opposed. This was in part due to the Brooklyn Eagle issue of September 19, 1942 having alarmed some residents of Brooklyn Heights with the front-page headline "Plan for Express Highway Is Shocking". The Eagle reported that the route proposed by Moses would bisect the neighborhood, even requiring at least the partial demolition of a recently built marble courthouse.

The news galvanized the leadership of the Brooklyn Heights Association, representing one of the city's more affluent and politically connected communities. Two men in particular, Roy M.D. Richardson, the association's president and a Wall Street corporate lawyer, and Ferdinand W. ("Fred") Nitardy, vice president for plant construction of Squibb Pharmaceuticals, which then had a major complex at the north end of Brooklyn Heights, lobbied hard for a route that would move the highway westward, to run along the water-fronting escarpment at the neighborhood's edge. Meanwhile, engineers with Andrews & Clark, the firm commissioned to build the highway, similarly concluded that the route along the escarpment was best, since an inland route would entail excessive condemnation costs.

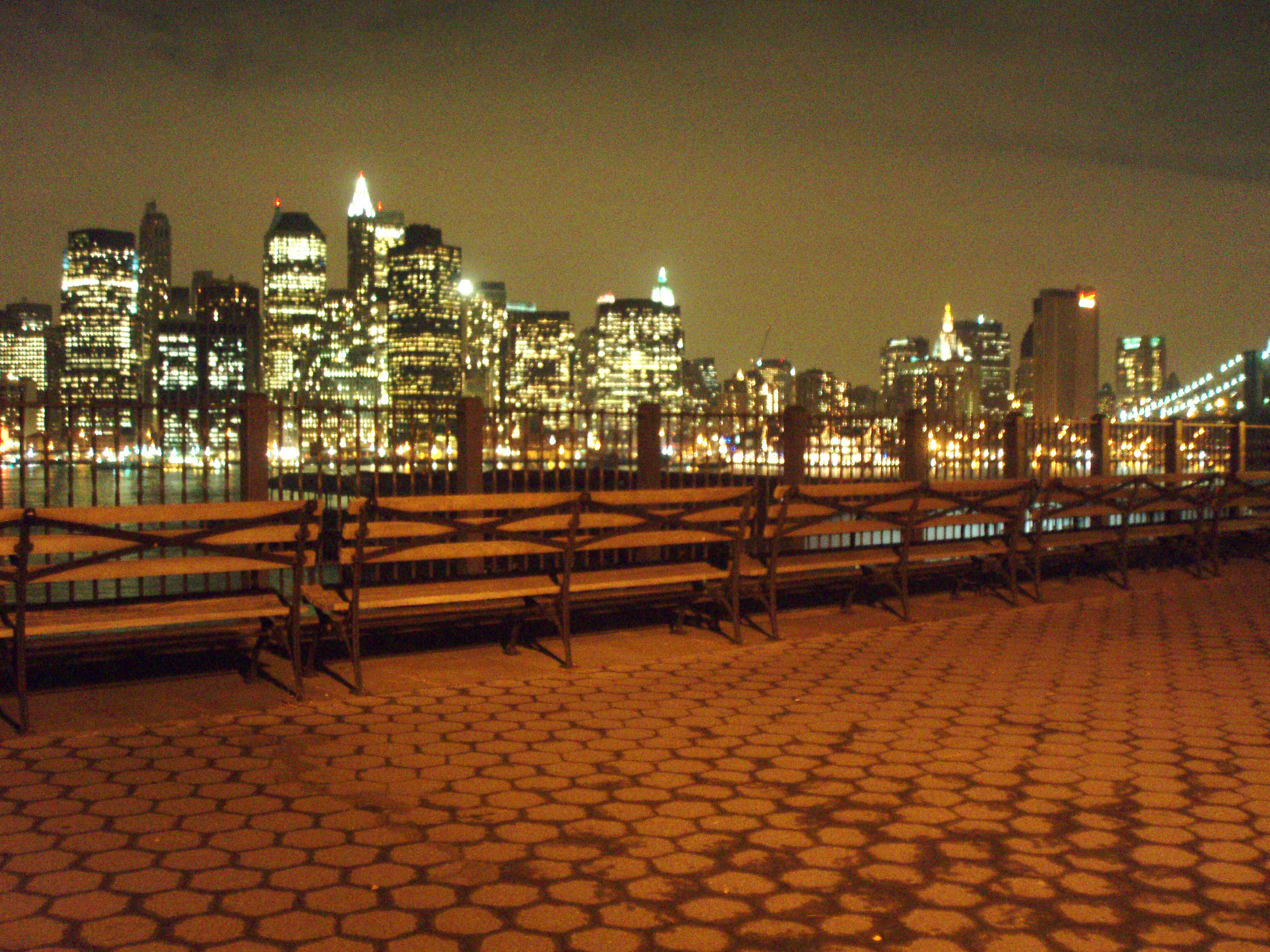
The view from the Promenade at night

By March 10, 1943, the date of a hearing before the City Planning Commission, the outer, or Furman Street, route had been settled on. The proposal presented at the hearing was for two roadways of three lanes each in either direction to be built side-by-side on top of the Heights escarpment. A plea by Nitardy at the hearing for the highway to be built on two separate decks with a "cover" on which he could restore his rear garden was heard with seeming sympathy by Moses. Moses agreed to the idea of the cover, but then, a month after the hearing, Brooklyn Borough President John Cashmore, whose office was in charge of the project, informed Nitardy by letter that the adopted plan "would preclude the use by you of the deck" above the highway, which would instead become a public esplanade. Moses betrayed no hint that a similar plan, with two highway decks covered, not by private gardens but by a public walkway, had already been drawn up at Andrews & Clark.

== Opening and early years ==
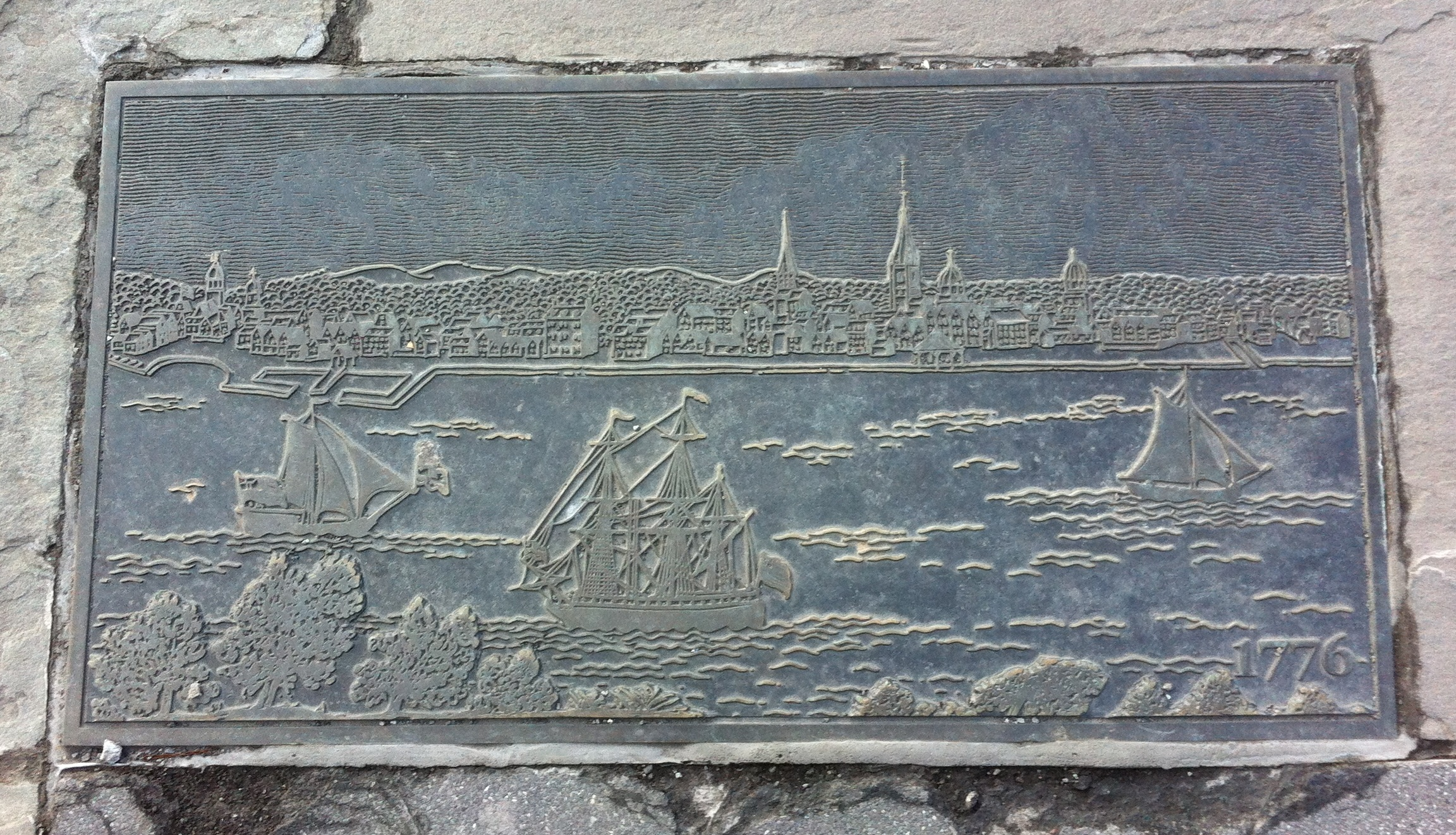
A plaque at the Brooklyn Heights Promenade showing the view of Manhattan in 1776.

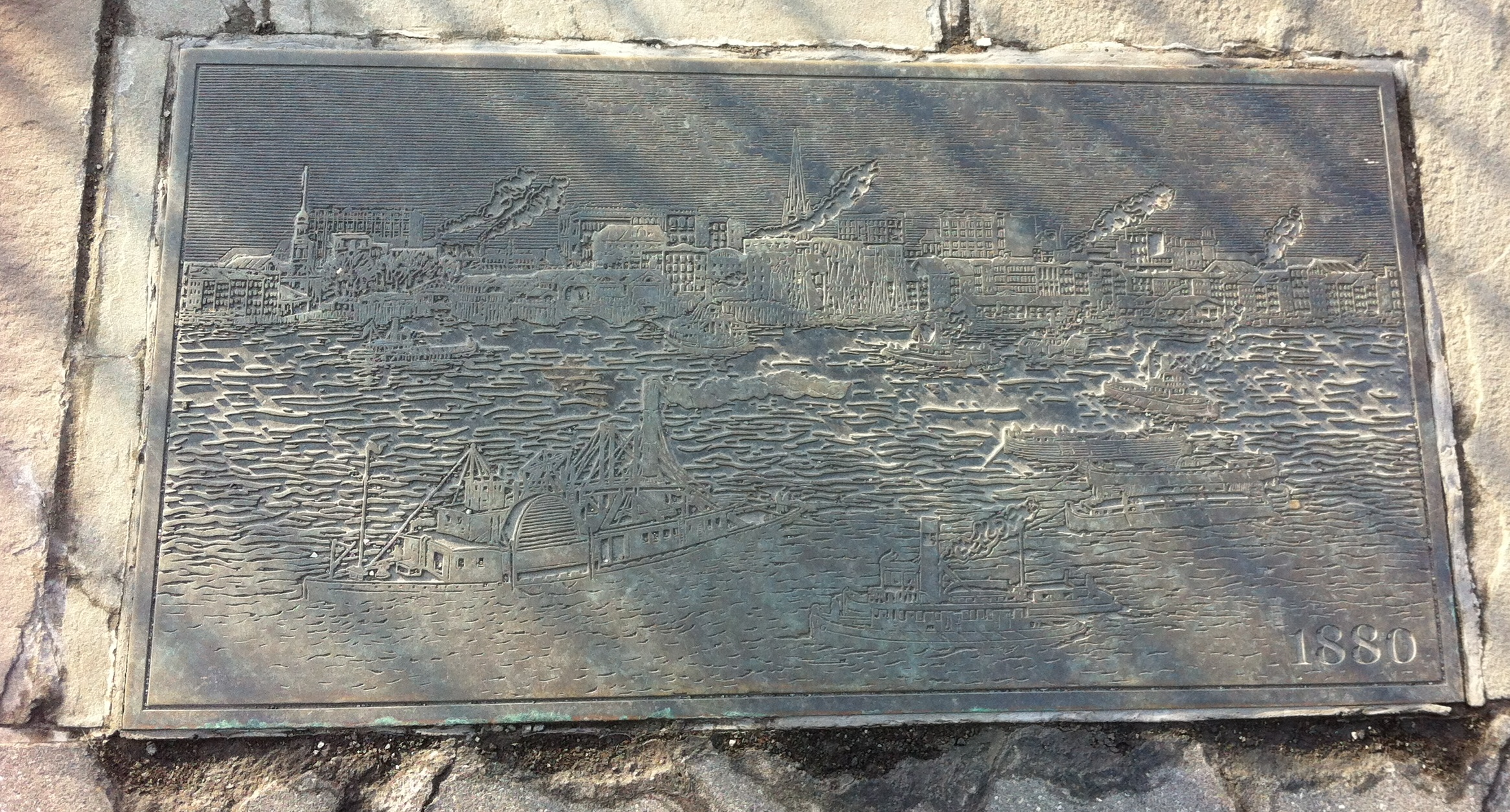
A plaque at the Brooklyn Heights Promenade showing the view of Manhattan in 1880.

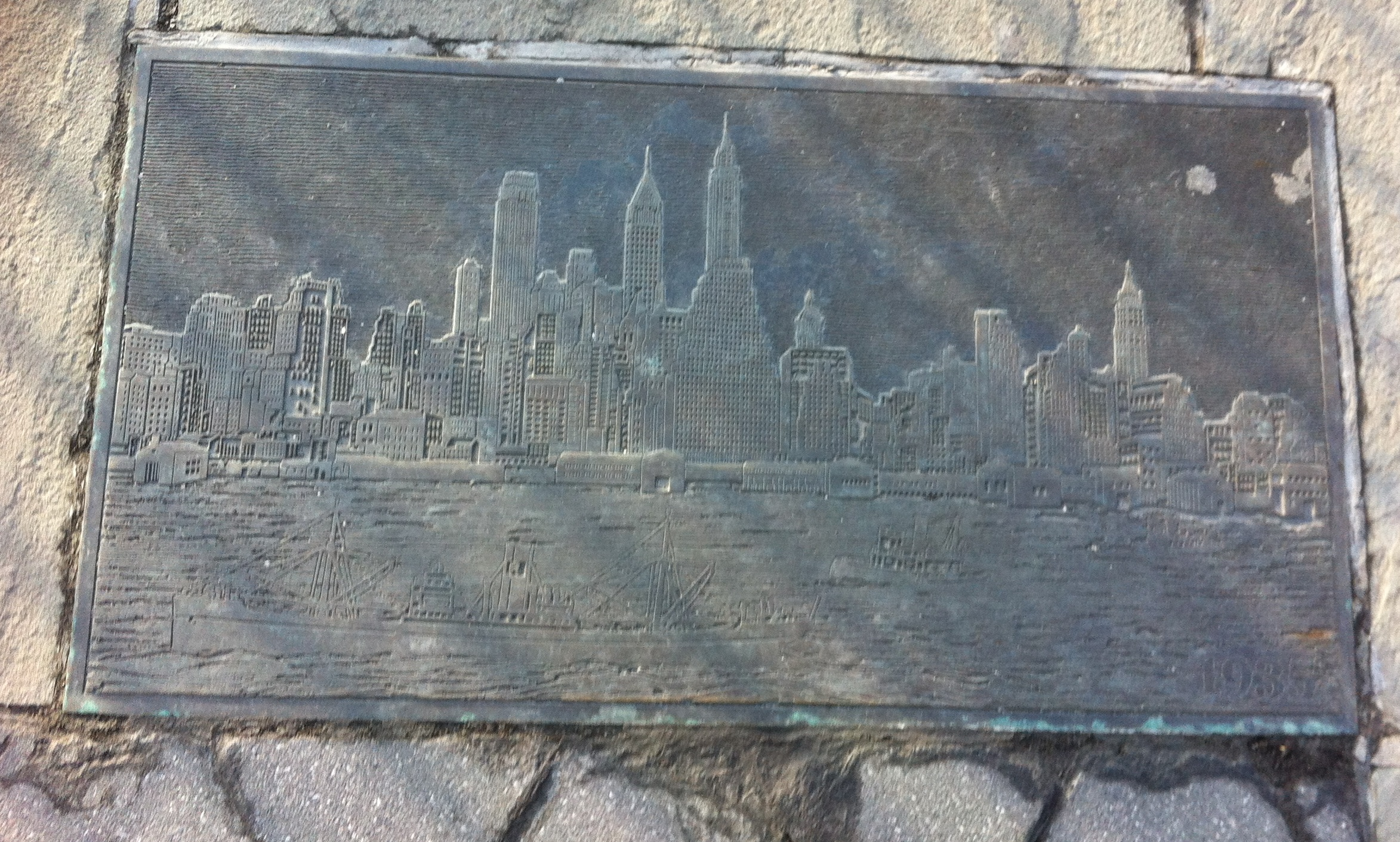
A plaque at the Brooklyn Heights Promenade showing the view of Manhattan in 1937.

Demolition of the warehouses that lined the eastern, or inland, side of Furman Street began in the fall of 1946, and construction of a triple cantilever section followed for the next few years. The southern half of the Promenade was opened to the public on October 7, 1950, and the northern half on December 7, 1951. The highway itself was not ready for traffic until 1954.

Apprehensions by many Brooklyn Heights residents that the Promenade as a public attraction would bring noisy disruptions and crime to the area were soon dissipated as it became a popular destination for residents and tourists alike.

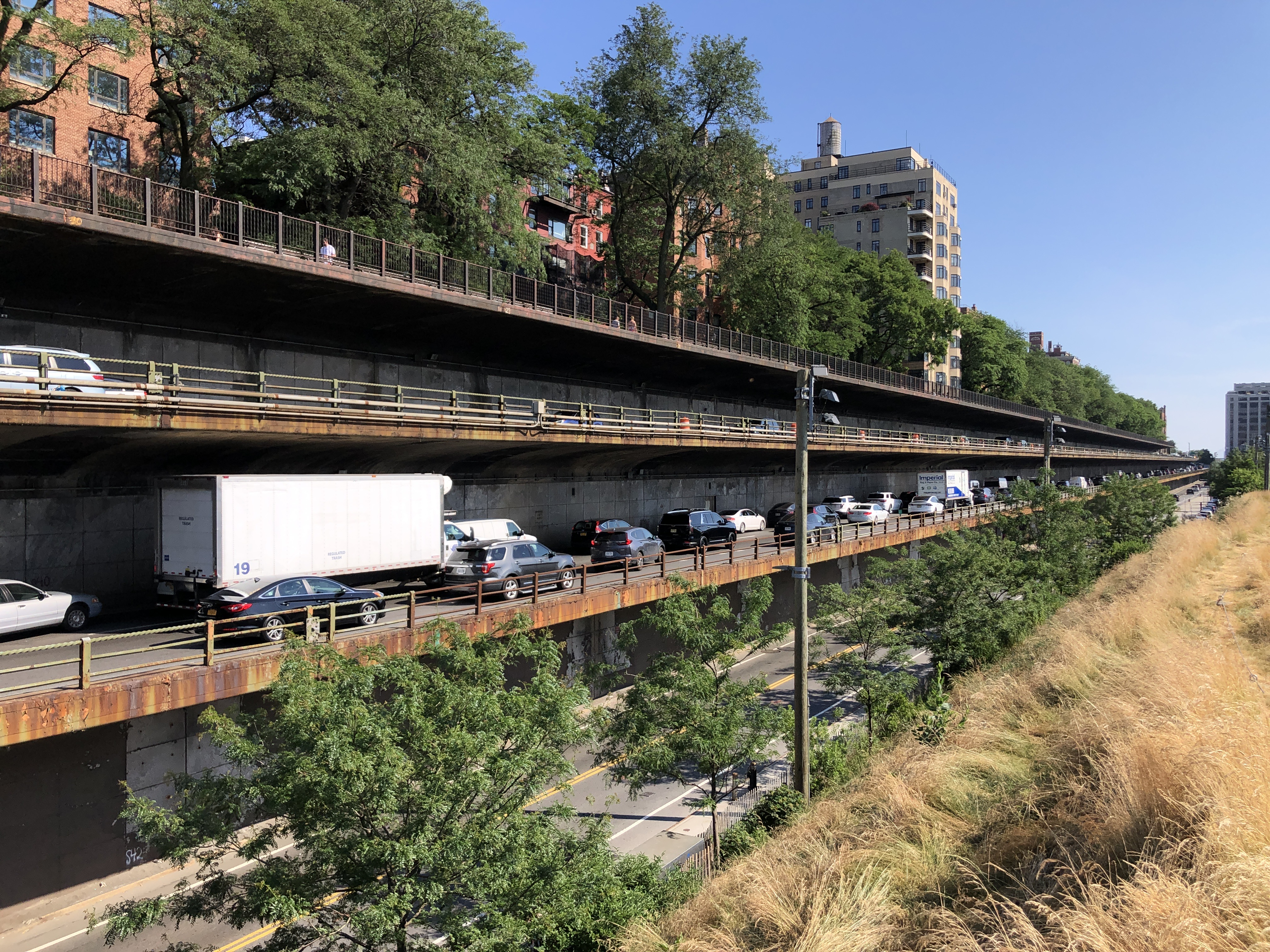
The Promenade and BQE in 2024, seen from Brooklyn Bridge Park

With the Promenade's success, various claims were made for who originated the idea. A proposal by the landowner and early developer Hezekiah Pierrepont in about 1827 for a promenade along the bluff of the Heights figures nowhere in the correspondence over the proposed highway. Other claims for and by Heights residents and others also lack documentation. One member of the Andrews & Clark team, the engineer S. Starr Walbridge, in 1982 claimed unequivocally that he had conceived both the cantilevering and the Promenade. However, the project's chief engineer, Ernest J. Clark, disputed his claim, contending that the design was a team effort and had "evolved" through considering various means of supporting the highway and testing their stresses and appearance. The firm's artist Julian Michele, the man who did the renderings of the designs and whom Walbridge cited for corroboration, declined comment. Another engineer, Phillips H. Lovering, who was credited with mathematically working out the precise shapes of the cantilevers, agreed with Clark's view.

In 1953 a new concern arose when it was learned that the Port Authority of New York and New Jersey, which owned the warehouses still lining the west, or harbor, side of Furman Street, wished to reserve the right to replace them with structures up to 70 feet in height, or 20 feet higher than the level of the Promenade. The prospective loss of views from the still-new Promenade caused an outpouring of protest unprecedented for that time, and a rare "town hall" meeting was held at Brooklyn's Borough Hall on May 7, 1953. Among officials on the dais were Cashmore, Moses, and Austin Tobin, executive director of the Port Authority. They met the audience's questions and demands with evasiveness. Moses afterward responded to a letter questioning his position by writing, "The city cannot do a piece of spot zoning simply protecting this particular view." Nevertheless, the city on June 25 did just that, limiting structures across from the Promenade to a height of 50 feet. It went further in 1974 by enacting a "Special Scenic District" that imagined a "view plane" for a protected view extending from the edge of the Promenade to a line roughly midway in the East River that no new structure could pierce. This remains in effect, and is the only such in the city, although another has been proposed for Battle Hill.

The remaining warehouses were demolished in the late 1950s, opening up what still had been partly obstructed views.

== 21st century ==
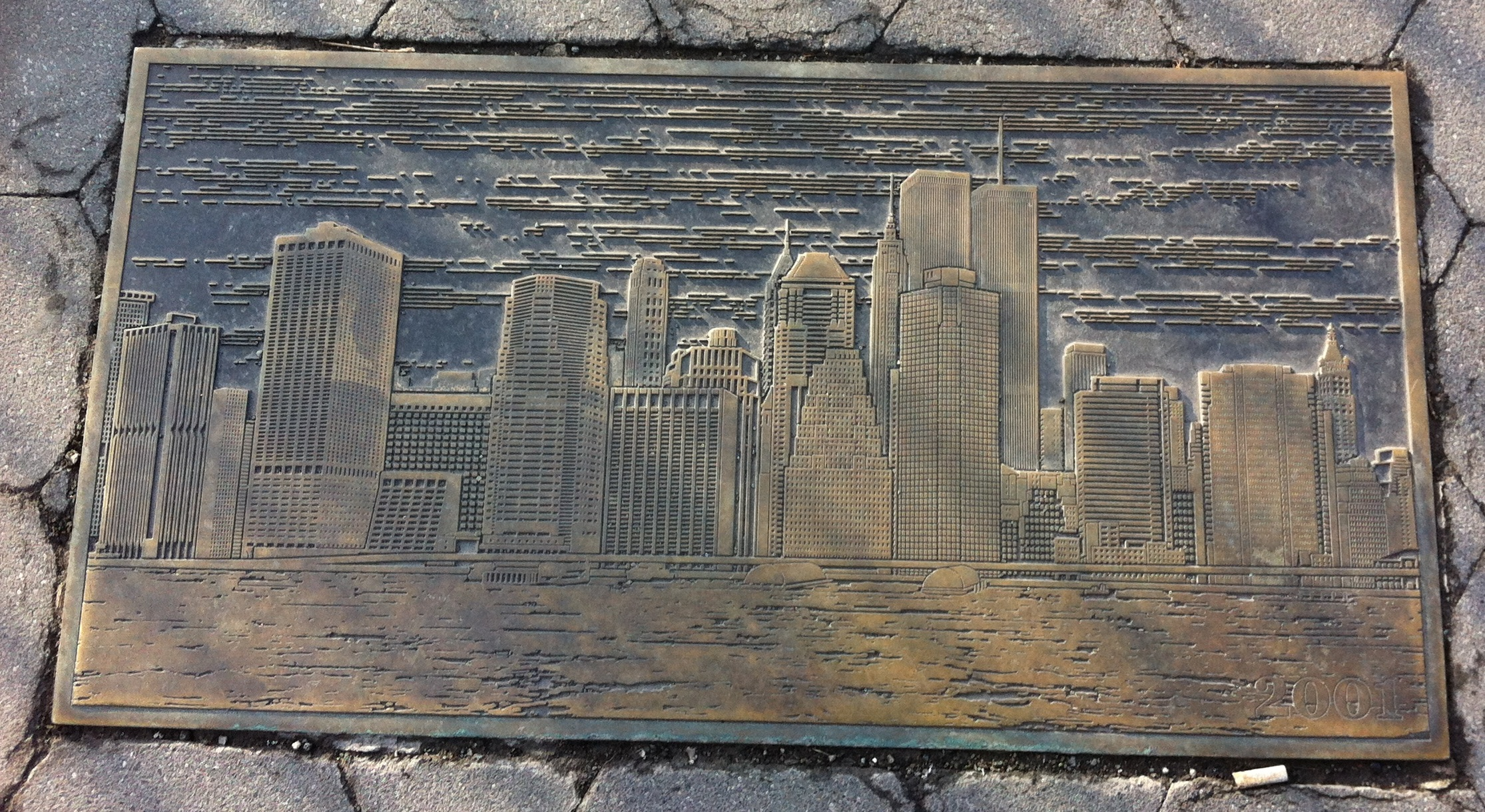
A plaque at the Brooklyn Heights Promenade showing the view of Manhattan in 2001.

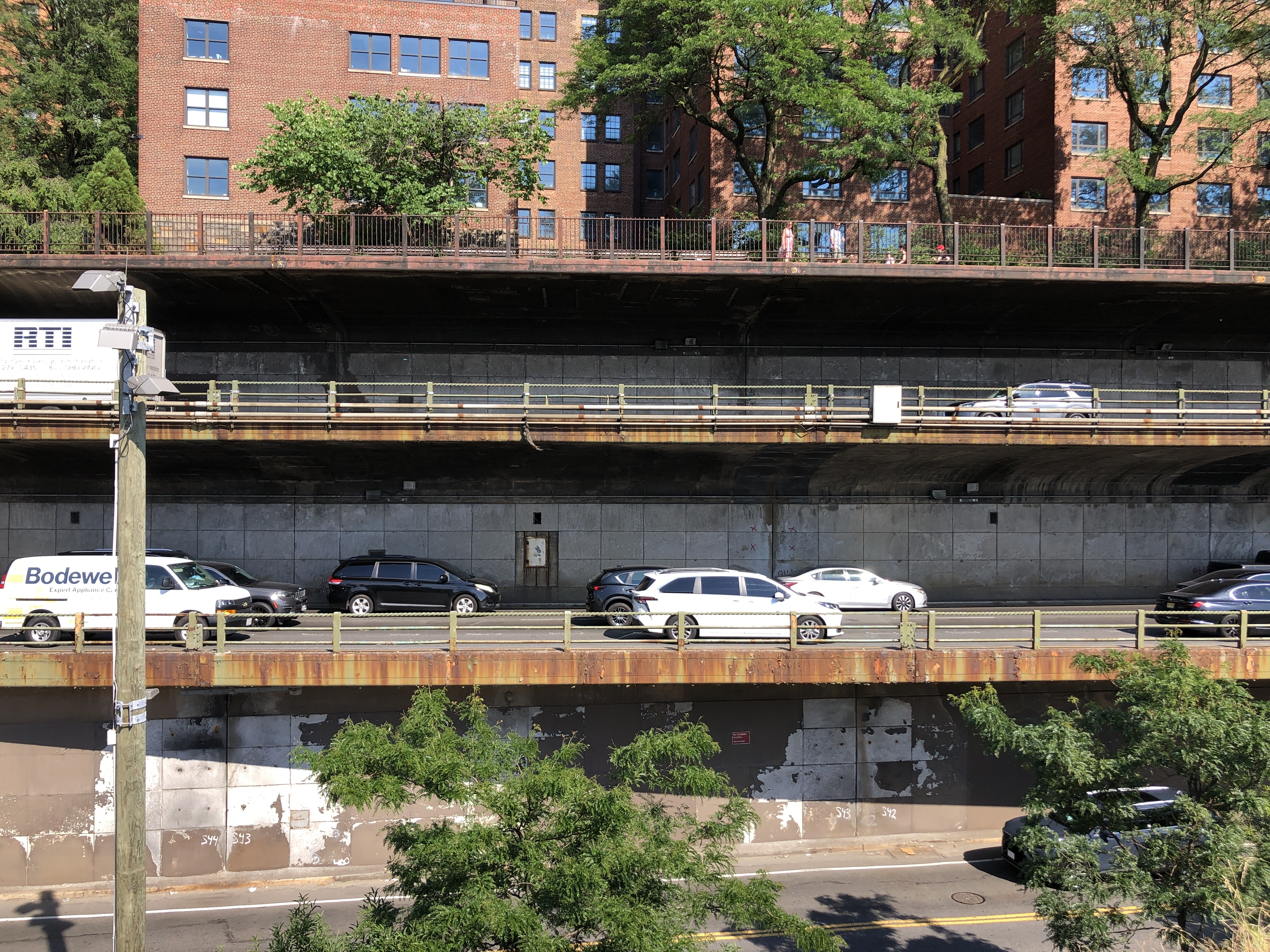
The Promenade from Brooklyn Bridge Park in 2024, showing deterioration

With the construction of Brooklyn Bridge Park, the foreground view from the Promenade was given a more landscape-like look. Gentrification continues along the Promenade's route. The Squibb Park Bridge was constructed in 2013 to provide access between the promenade and park, but was rebuilt between 2019 and 2020 due to various structural issues.

In 2017 the New York City Department of Transportation initiated a project to repair the section with a planned start in 2020 or 2021. Over time, the condition of the Promenade has worsened due to deterioration in its rebar structure. It was estimated that if nothing was done, vehicle weight restrictions would be placed on the expressway below it by 2026, and the Promenade section of the BQE would need to completely close for reconstruction by 2036. In fall 2018, the New York City Department of Transportation proposed two options. The cheapest option was to build a temporary 6-lane highway in the location of the Promenade while they repaired the underlying structure and BQE. This option would require the Promenade to be closed for six years and would cost $3.2 to $3.6 billion.

Temporary viewing areas would be set up while the Promenade was being repaired, and at the conclusion of the project, part of the temporary highway would be converted into a widened promenade area. The other option was to repair the existing 3-lane highway below the Promenade one lane at a time. This would only require the Promenade to be closed for two years, and parts of the Promenade would stay open during construction, but reconstruction of the BQE itself would take at least 8 years and cost $3.4 to $4.0 billion. Because of sizable opposition to the cheaper option, mayor Bill de Blasio later stated that his administration was open to considering other ideas, including routing the expressway over the Brooklyn Bridge Park, slightly to the west.

== In popular culture ==
The Promenade has appeared in the movies Annie Hall, Moonstruck, Sweet November, and They Came Together among others.

Type O Negative and Carnivore frontman Peter Steele worked as a supervisor at the Promenade between the early 1980s and 1994.
