= John Cleve Green =

American merchant

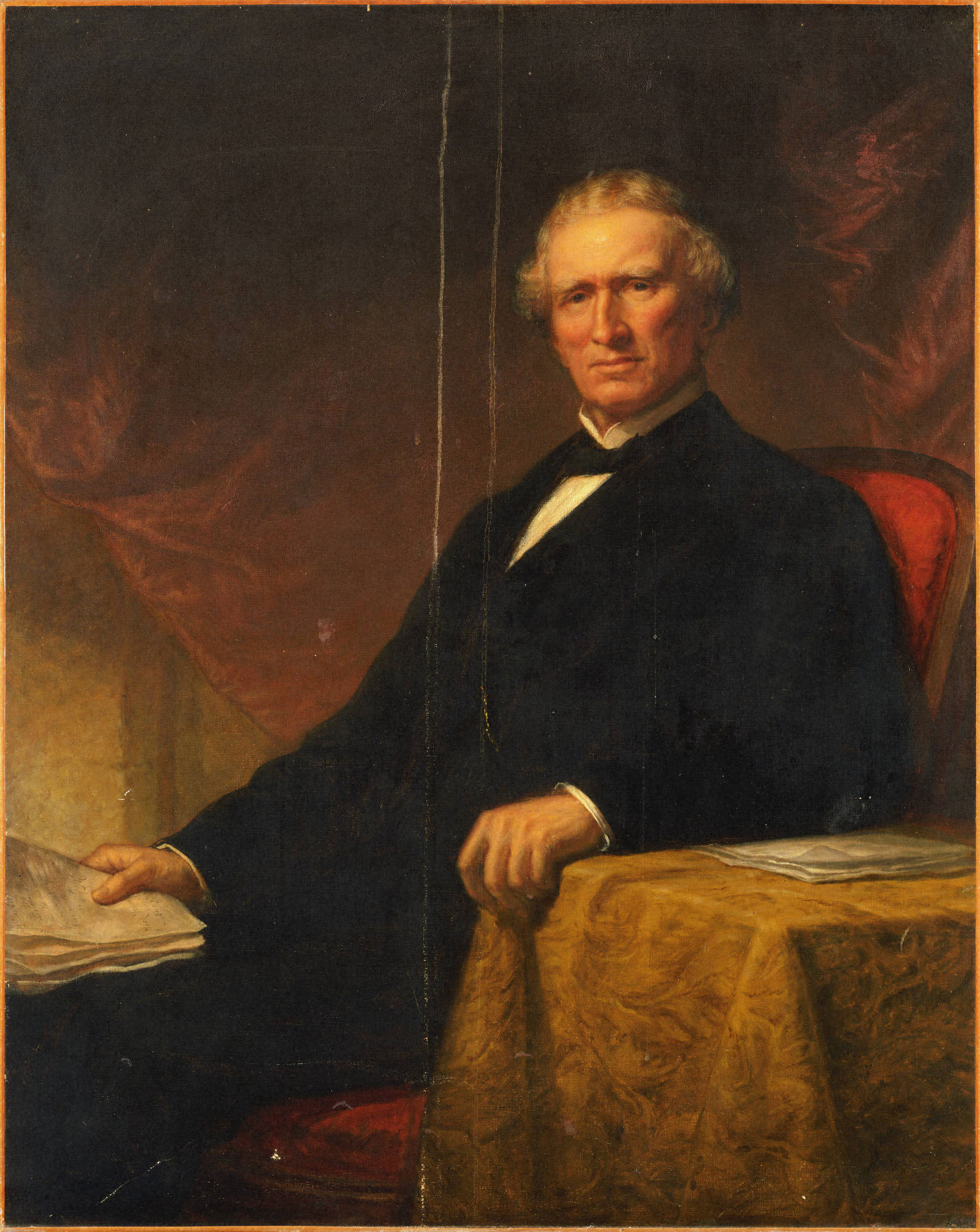
- A portrait of Green by Daniel Huntington in 1870, courtesy of the Princeton University Art Museum
- Born: April 14, 1800; Lawrenceville, New Jersey
- Died: April 29, 1875 (aged 75); New York, New York
- Education: Lawrenceville School
- Occupation: Merchant
- Known for: Philanthropy

John Cleve Green (April 14, 1800 – April 29, 1875) was a merchant and former partner of John Murray Forbes in the China trading house of Russell & Company. Green was a major benefactor of Princeton University and the Lawrenceville School, giving upwards of 1.5 million dollars, perhaps 2 million, to Princeton. On his death he also made major bequests to New York University and New York area hospitals.

== Biography ==
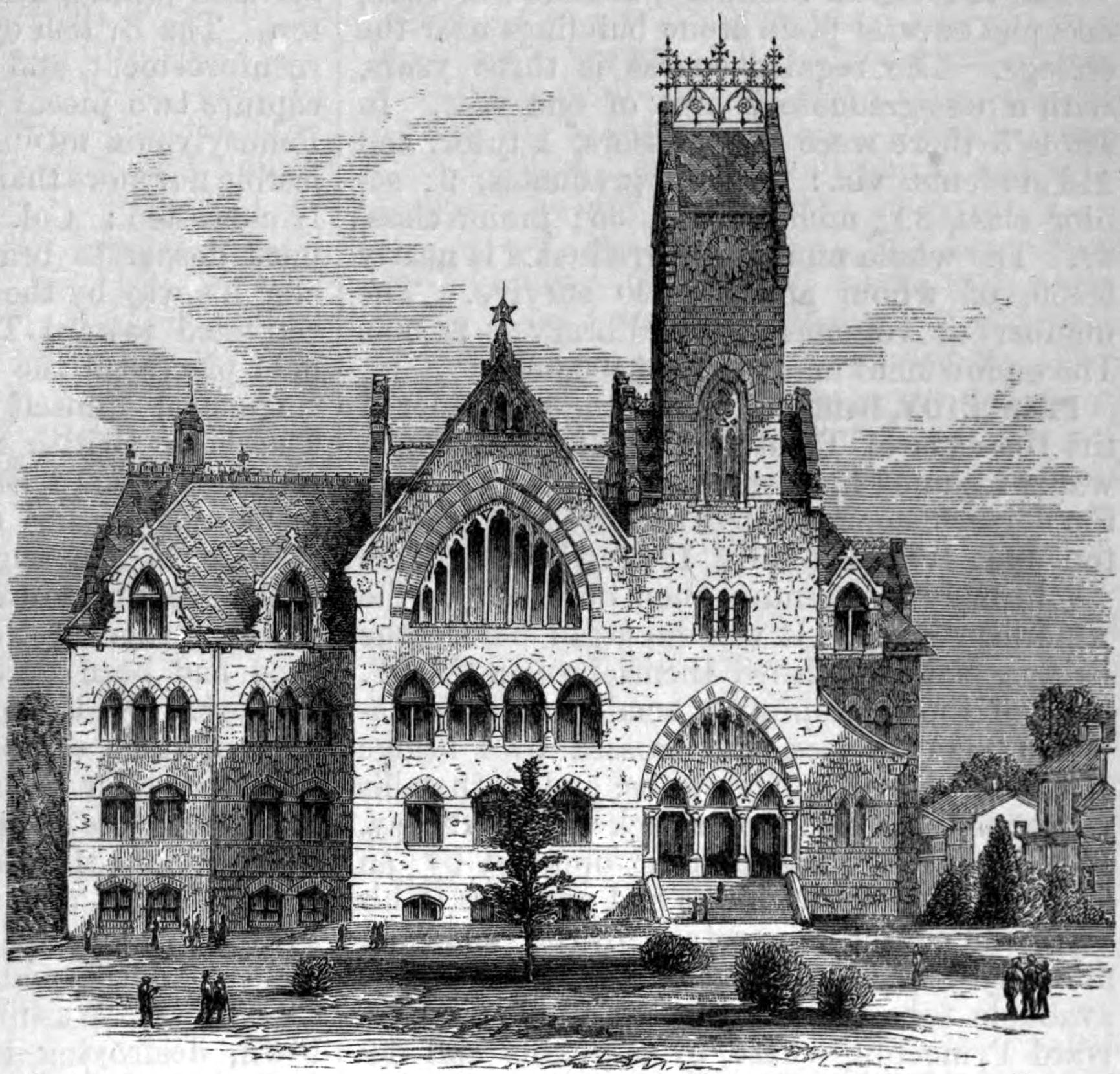
The John C. Green School of Science at Princeton University

=== Early life and family ===
Green was born on April 14, 1800, in Lawrenceville, New Jersey, where his father, Caleb Smith Green, was a farmer.

=== Merchant career ===
As a young man, Green entered the house of N. L. & G. Griswold, merchants in the China trade on South Street in New York City, and displayed so much sagacity as a clerk that he was appointed supercargo of the ship Panama, a well-known tea clipper of the day, and of other vessels. He subsequently made many voyages to China and South America.

In 1833, he was admitted to the house of Russell & Co., in Canton (now Guangzhou), China, and there laid the foundation of his large fortune. In 1839, on his return to New York, he married Sarah Helen, daughter of George Griswold, and carried on the China trade for many years thereafter, acquiring a fortune of about $7,000,000.

=== Other activities ===
Green was prominent in the social, business and public enterprises of the city. For many years he was a director of The Bank of Commerce, a member of the Chamber of Commerce and a manager of several leading charitable and public institutions. Always known as a man of clear views, strong convictions and great force of character, Green took an active interest in New York University, Princeton Theological Seminary and Princeton College. He owned a town house on Washington Square Park in New York City and a large country house with much land at New Brighton on Staten Island where Curtis High School now stands.

=== Personal life ===
The father of three children all of whom died in childhood, Green's brother, Henry W. Green, was at one time Chancellor of New Jersey, and his brother in law, Frederick Frelinghuysen, senator from the same state.

Green died in 1875, at his residence on Washington Square.
