= E. R. Squibb =

American pharmaceutical businessman (1819–1900)

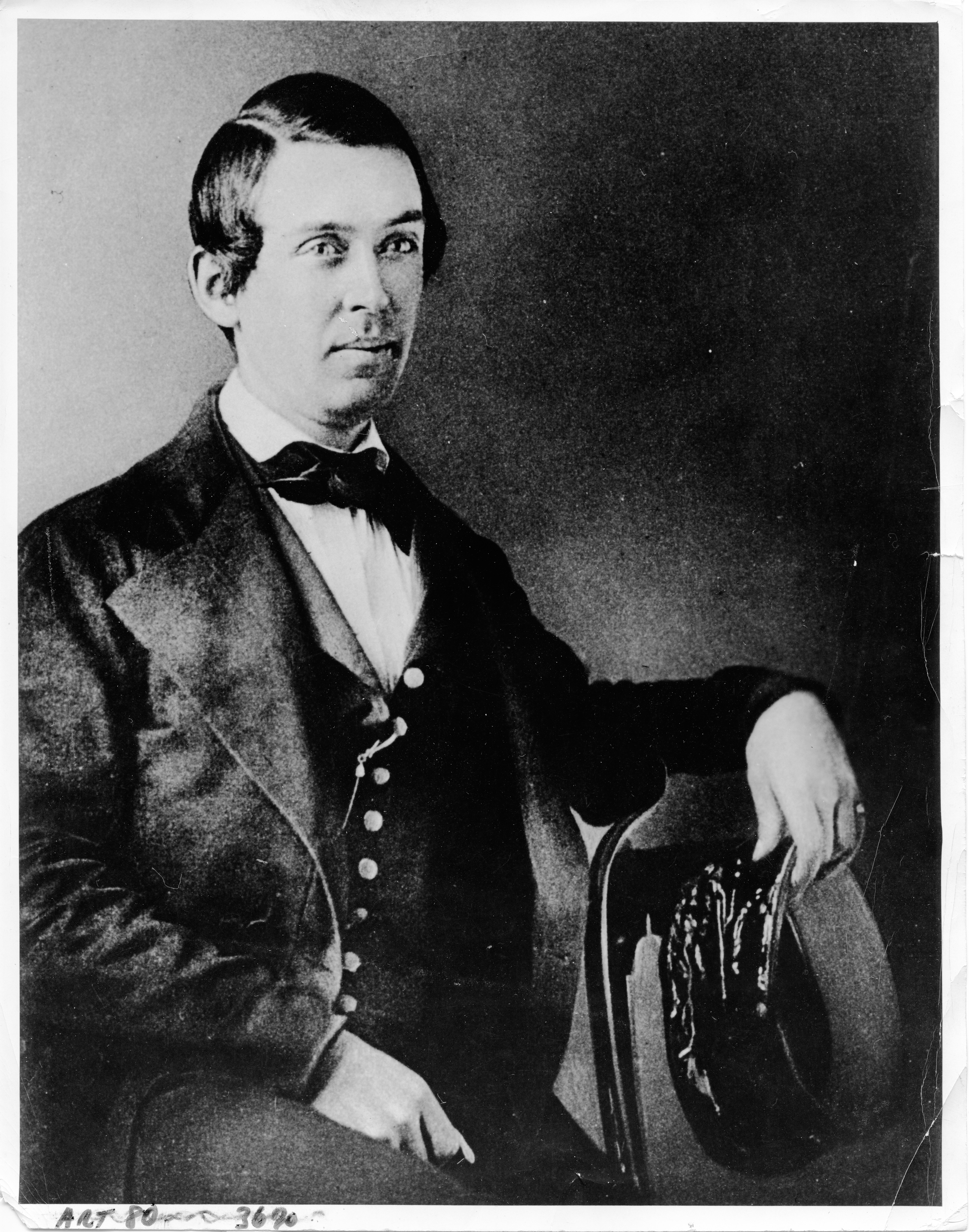
- Born: Edward Robinson Squibb; July 4, 1819; Wilmington, Delaware, U.S.
- Died: October 25, 1900 (aged 81); Brooklyn, New York, U.S.
- Education: Jefferson Medical College
- Occupations: Inventor and manufacturer of pharmaceuticals; Physician
- Known for: Founded E. R. Squibb and Sons
- Notable work: Squibb's Ephemeris of Materia Medica
- Spouse: Caroline Lownds Cook

Edward Robinson Squibb (July 4, 1819 – October 25, 1900) was a medical doctor, a leading American inventor, and a manufacturer of pharmaceutics who founded E. R. Squibb and Sons, which eventually became part of the modern pharmaceutical giant Bristol-Myers Squibb.

== Early life ==
Squibb was born in Wilmington, Delaware, on July 4, 1819. He was the son of James Robinson Squibb (1796–1852) and Catherine Harrison (née Bonsal) Squibb (1798–1833), both Quakers. By 12 years, he had watched his mother and all of his three sisters die within a year of each other. His father also suffered a stroke and remained invalid throughout his life. At age 26 he graduated from Jefferson Medical College in Philadelphia, Pennsylvania. Due to poverty, Squibb had to pay for his own tuition by working as an apprentice for a pharmacist in Philadelphia.

== Career ==
Immediately after graduating from medical school, he became a ship's doctor in the U.S. Navy. He served during the Mexican–American War as an assistant surgeon. This profession, did not sit well with his Quaker family as well as his local Meeting, which disowned him for violating his pledge of pacifism. Squibb is said to have maintained that his service did not contradict his pledge as he was assuaging suffering and participating in the Navy's mission to eradicate overseas slave trade. After the war, he ran the Brooklyn Naval Hospital's medical station at Brooklyn Navy Yard.

As a Navy physician, Squibb became disenchanted with the poor quality of medicines used on American military vessels and, as a result, in 1854 he invented an improved method of distilling ether, an anesthetic. He gave away his distillation method, rather than patent it for profit.

=== Squibb Company ===
In 1858, he left the military and started his own pharmaceutics manufacturing business in Brooklyn. His laboratory burned down three times, and in one of these instances an ether explosion left Squibb badly burned. Despite his severe injury, Squibb reopened his laboratory a year later and by 1883, he was manufacturing over 300 products being sold globally.

In 1892, Squibb created a partnership with his two sons, Dr. Edward H. Squibb and Charles F. Squibb, a firm known for generations afterwards as E. R. Squibb and Sons. Squibb was known as a vigorous advocate of quality control and high purity standards within the fledgling pharmaceutical industry of his time, at one point self-publishing an alternative to the U.S. Pharmacopeia (Squibb's Ephemeris of Materia Medica) after failing to convince the American Medical Association to incorporate higher purity standards. Mentions of the Materia Medica, Squibb products, and Edward Squibb's opinion on the utility and best method of preparation for various medicines are found in many medical papers of the late 1800s. Squibb Corporation served as a major supplier of medical goods to the Union Army during the American Civil War, providing portable medical kits containing morphine, surgical anesthetics, and quinine for the treatment of malaria (which was endemic to the eastern United States at that time).

Squibb was elected to the American Philosophical Society in 1897.

== Personal life ==
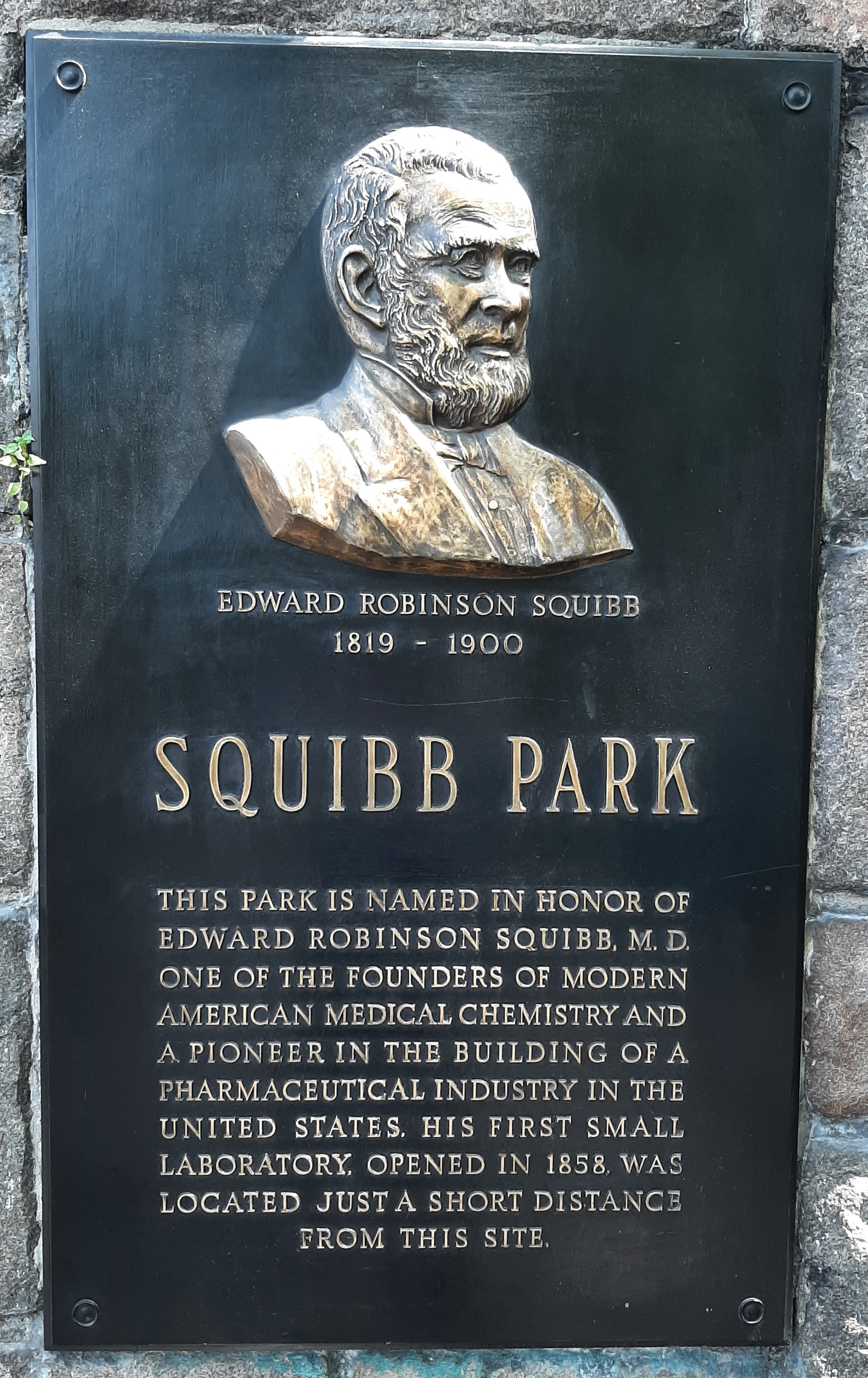
Plaque of E. R. Squibb at Squibb Park, Brooklyn, New York City

Squibb was married to Caroline F. Lownds Cook (1833–1905) of Philadelphia. Together, they were the parents of:

- Dr. Edward Hamilton Squibb (1853–1929), who married Jane Graves Sampson (1855–1915)
- Charles Fellows Squibb (1858–1942), who married Margaret Rapelje Dodge (1859–1930)
- Mary King Squibb (1865–1950), who married Dr. John Cummings "J.C." Munro (1858–1910).
- George Hanson Squibb (1867–1869), who died as a very small child.

Squibb died on October 25, 1900, at his home, 152 Columbia Heights in Brooklyn, New York, from a ruptured blood vessel.

== See also ==
- Squibb Park Bridge
