= John C. Green School of Science =

Destroyed building in Princeton, New Jersey

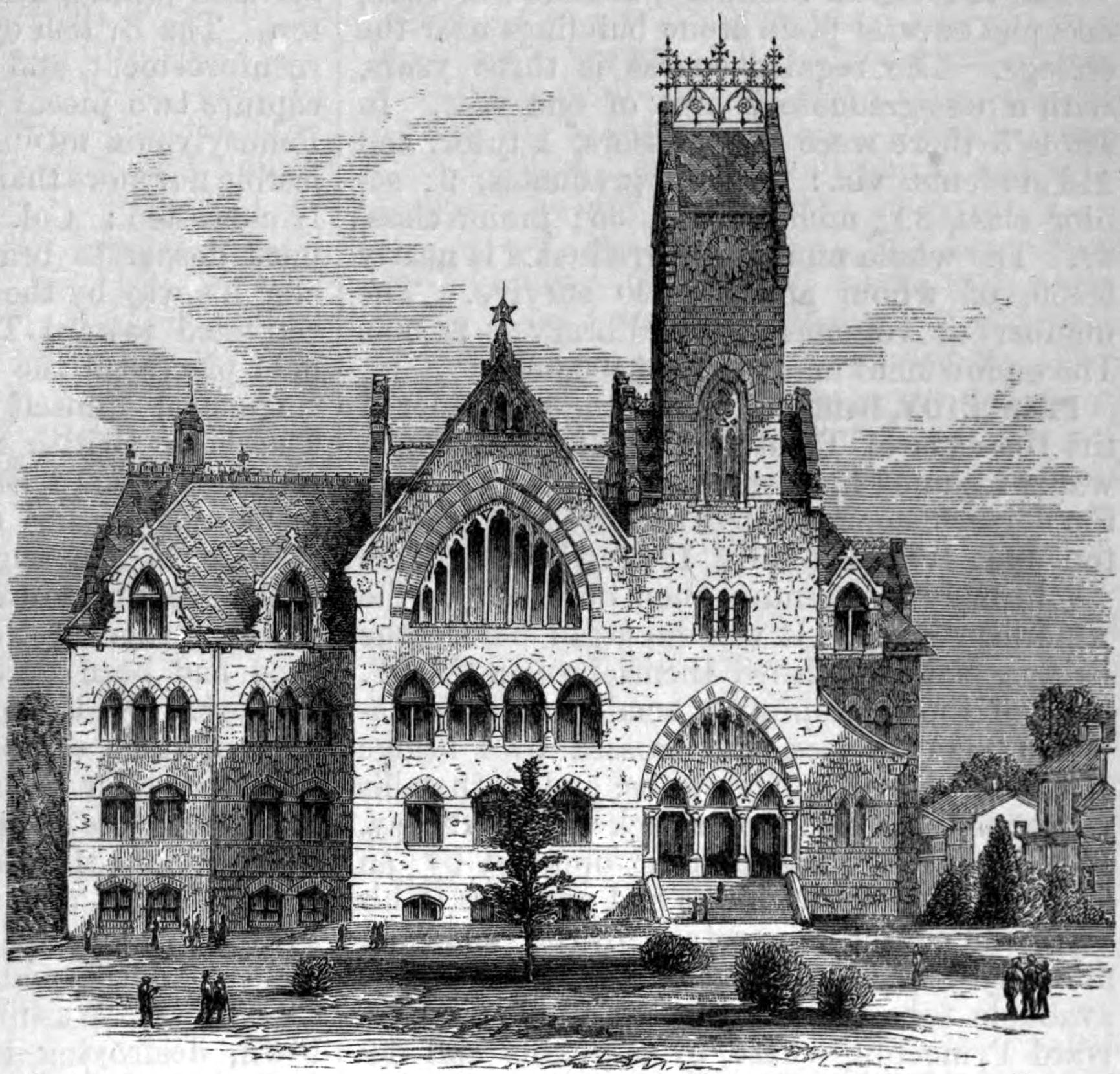
- Woodcut view of the Green School of Science in 1879
- Interactive map of the John C. Green School of Science area

General information
- Status: Destroyed
- Type: Laboratory
- Architectural style: High Victorian Gothic
- Location: Princeton, New Jersey, United States
- Coordinates: 40°20′58.8″N 74°39′24.9″W
- Named for: John Cleve Green
- Completed: 1874
- Inaugurated: May, 1873 by Joseph Henry
- Destroyed: November 26, 1928
- Cost: $100,000
- Owner: Princeton University

Height
- Height: 140 ft (43 m)

Design and construction
- Architect: William Appleton Potter

The John C. Green School of Science was a building built in September 1873 located near the corner of Nassau Street and Washington Road in Princeton, New Jersey. It was endowed by John Cleve Green. It housed the science department of the College of New Jersey (the original name of Princeton University). On November 26, 1928, it was destroyed by a fire.

== Gallery ==
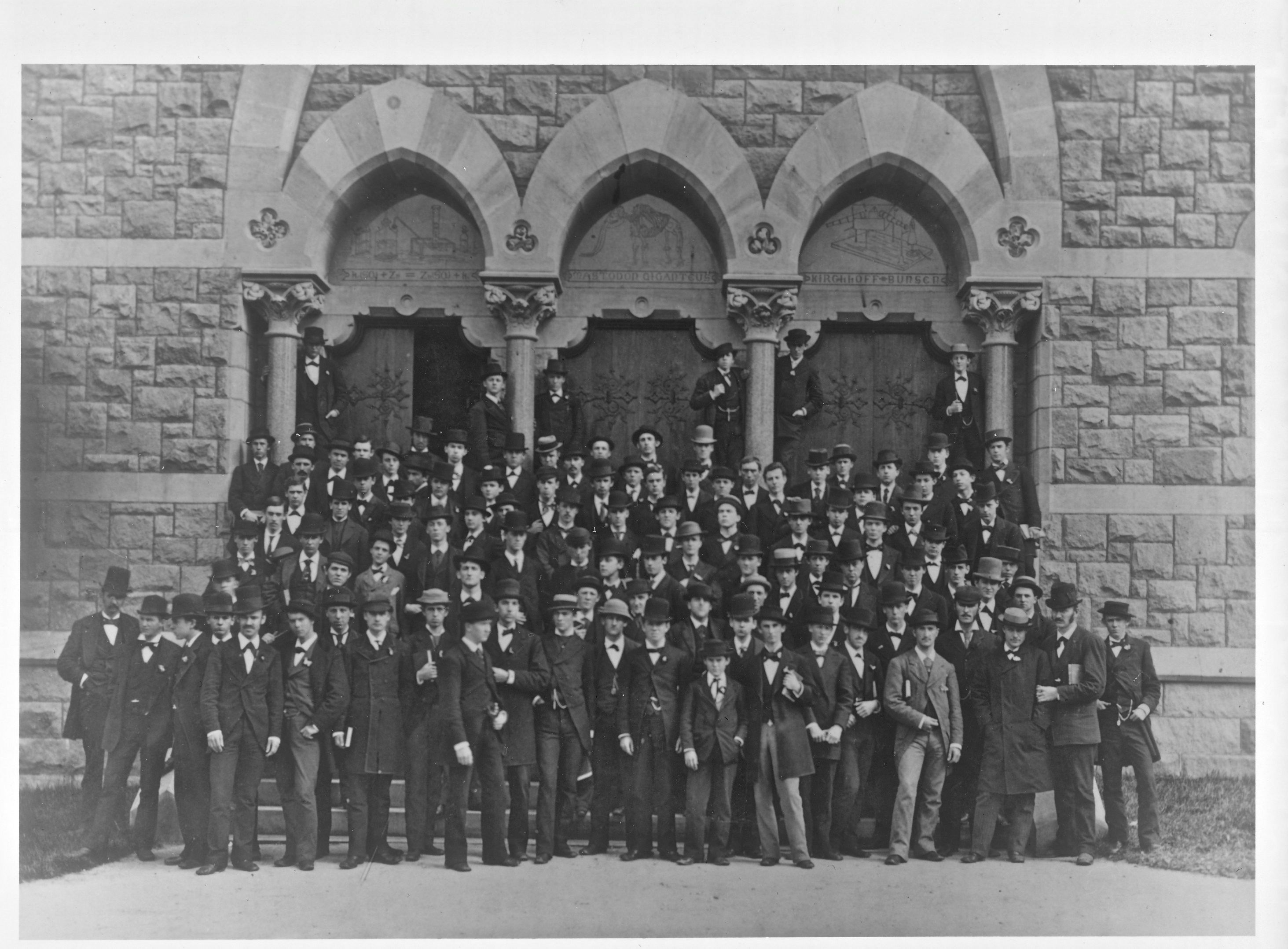
The Princeton class of 1879, including Woodrow Wilson, on the steps of the School of Science

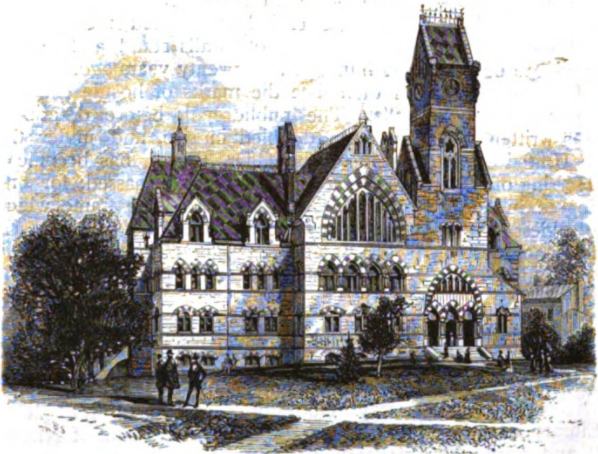
A depiction of the School of Science in 1877
