= Theodore Zoli =

American structural engineer

Theodore P. Zoli, III
- Born: 1965 or 1966 (age 59–60); Schroon Lake, New York, U.S.
- Education: Princeton University (B.S., 1988); California Institute of Technology (M.S., 1989)
- Known for: Long-span bridge design
- Awards: MacArthur Fellow; ENR Award of Excellence
- Scientific career
- Fields: Structural engineering
- Workplaces: HNTB

Theodore P. Zoli, III is an American structural engineer, and a leading designer of cable-stayed bridges. He is currently the National Bridge Chief Engineer at HNTB Corporation and is a 2009 MacArthur Fellow.

== Career ==
Zoli was born in Schroon Lake, New York. He graduated from Princeton University with a B.S. in 1988 and from the California Institute of Technology with an M.S. in 1989. Since 1990, Zoli has worked for HNTB Corporation. He is a visiting lecturer at Princeton University and Adjunct Professor of Civil Engineering and Engineering Mechanics at Columbia University.

In the aftermath of September 11, 2001, Zoli has focused on the retrofit of bridges across the United States. He developed a novel composite material for lightweight, blast-resistant coverings for a broad array of construction applications stating, “Engineers learn from events, and what 9-11 taught us was that we have to design for unforeseen events; that’s what I’m interested in: designing for things we can’t anticipate.” His blast-resistant bridge work helped earn him the 2009 MacArthur Foundation award.

Zoli designed the new Lake Champlain Bridge connecting New York to Vermont, replacing an older structure and using a unique modified network tied-arch bridge design. Zoli led completion of the design of the Lake Champlain Bridge in an unprecedented 10 weeks in an effort to mitigate community impacts of the prior bridge closing due to structural deterioration of unreinforced piers. The modified network tied-arch bridge design, selected by local public from among five bridge alternatives presented by Zoli, allowed the main span to be constructed off site and lifted into place by barge, accommodating the replacement within two years of closure of the original bridge built in 1929. The project performed permitting, final design, and advertisement all occurring concurrently, coining the term dynamic design/bid/build. The new bridge was opened to traffic on November 7, 2011 nearly two years after the original bridge was closed. He designed the Squibb Park Bridge, a pedestrian bridge in Brooklyn, which opened in 2013. It was demolished in 2019 due to structural problems and following a lawsuit against his firm.

== Awards ==
- 2009 MacArthur Fellows Program
- 2012 Engineering News-Record, Award of Excellence

== Works ==
- Leonard P. Zakim Bunker Hill Memorial Bridge
- Blennerhassett Island Bridge
- Bob Kerrey Pedestrian Bridge
- Lake Champlain Bridge (2011-present)
- Jeremiah Morrow Bridge
- South Park Bridge
