= Timeline of Brooklyn =

Coordinates: 40.693°N 73.990°W

This is a timeline and chronology of the history of Brooklyn, New York. Brooklyn is the most populous of New York City's boroughs, and was settled in 1646.

== 17th century ==
- 1646 – Village of "Breuckelen" on the western end of Long Island authorized by the colonizing Dutch West India Company for their North American colony of New Netherland. Named after the town of Breukelen in the province of Utrecht in the Netherlands, "the old country".
- 1652 – The Wyckoff House is estimated to have been built in 1652, one of the first structures built by Europeans on Long Island. Only a small section remains from 1652. It was declared a National Historic Landmark in 1967. and is owned by New York City but is operated by a nonprofit agency.
- 1654 - Municipal privileges of Brooklyn enlarged.
- 1658 Old Gravesend Cemetery – National Register of Historic Places, a cemetery (now at Gravesend Neck Road and McDonald Avenue in Gravesend), was founded about 1658 and contains the graves of a number of the original patentees and settlers with their families.
- 1664 – Dutch (Governor) Peter Stuyvesant surrenders the colony to the Royal Navy's English fleet under the authority of the James, the Duke of York. New Netherland becomes the Province of New York.
- 1665 – perhaps Brooklyn's first murder trial, Albert Cornelis Wantenaer was found guilty of manslaughter for the death in Wallabout Bay of Barent Jansen Blom.
- 1677 – New Utrecht Reformed Church established of the Dutch Reformed Church and is the fourth oldest church in Brooklyn. Both the church and the cemetery are listed in the National Register of Historic Places.

== 18th century ==
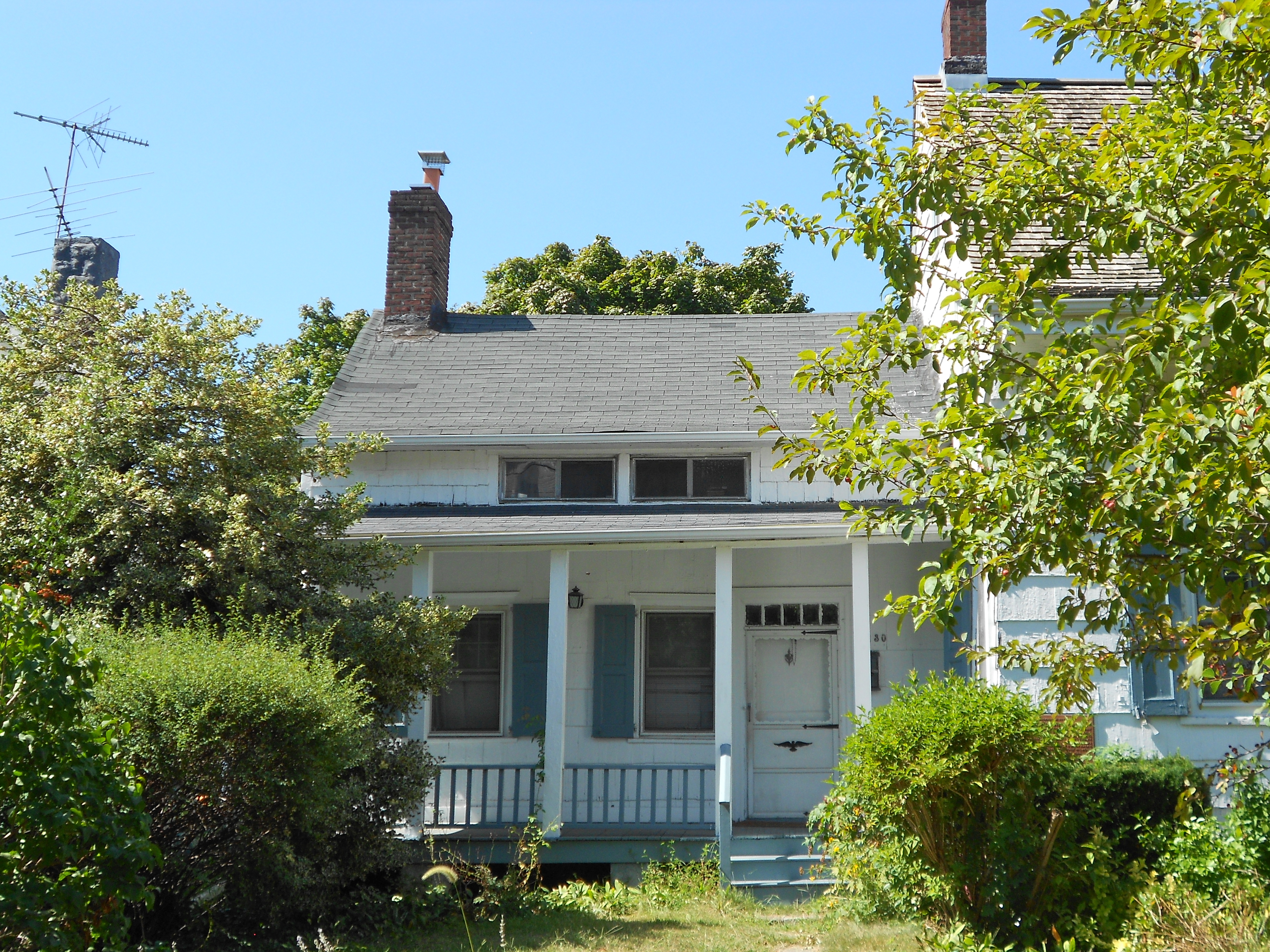
Wykoff-Bennet House, built c. 1744

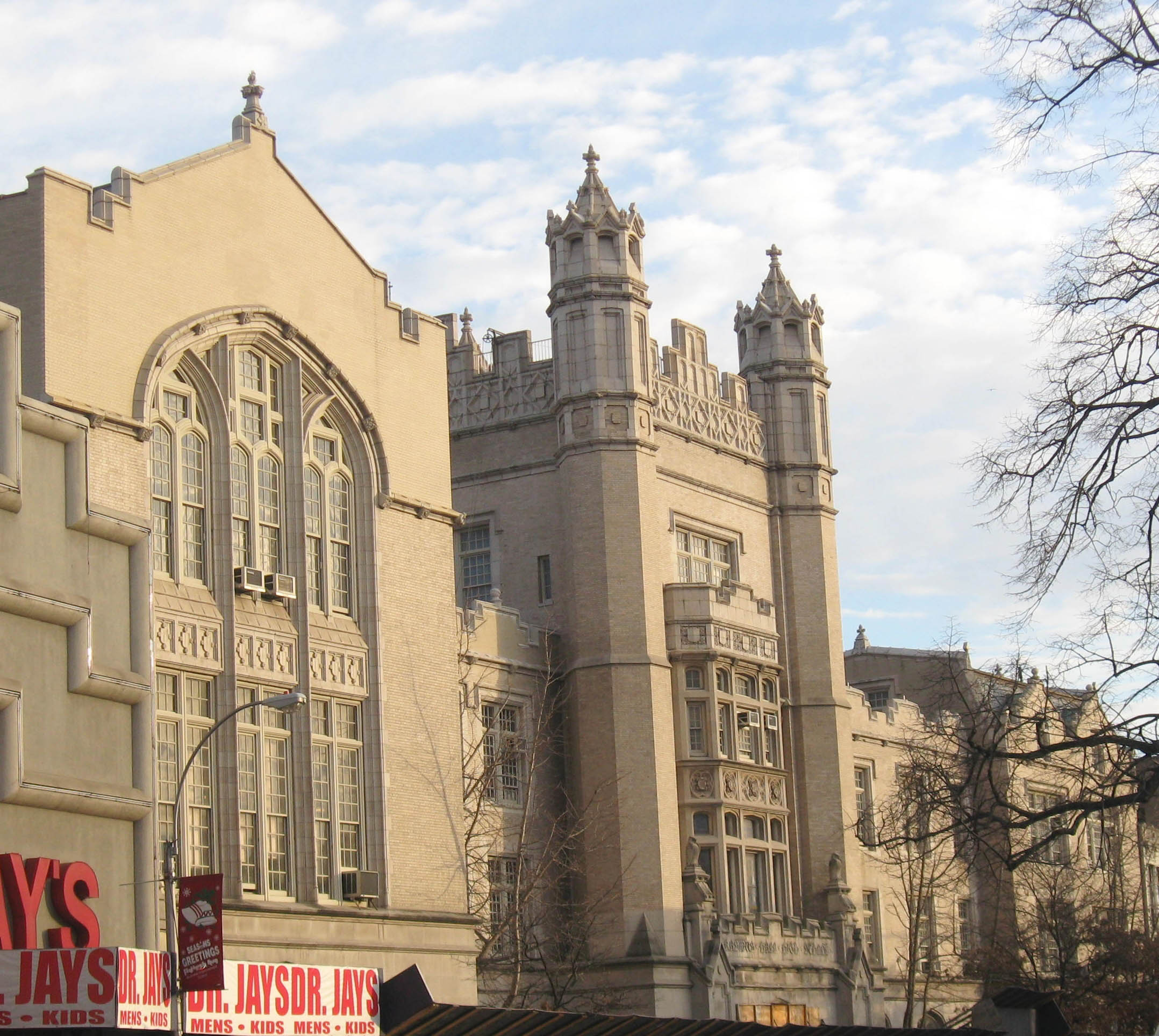
Erasmus Hall High School on Flatbush Avenue seen in 2008

- 1700 – New Utrecht Reformed Church built.
- 1744 – Joost Van Nuyse House, original section was built in 1744 and enlarged between 1793 and 1806. It was moved to its present site in 1925. It is a 1 1/2-story frame house with a steeply pitched flared roof. and was listed on the National Register of Historic Places in 2006.
- 1766 – Wyckoff-Bennett Homestead is believed to have been built before 1766. During the American Revolution, it housed Hessian soldiers for the British Army. It was declared a National Historic Landmark in 1976.
- 1776
  - June 22 - Mayor David Mathews was arrested in Flatbush on orders from George Washington related to his suspected involvement in the Hickey Plot to kill him.
  - August 27 – Battle of Long Island (also known as the "Battle of Brooklyn" or the "Battle of Brooklyn Heights"), the largest battle in the American Revolutionary War starts. British Army wins, beginning the New York and New Jersey campaign. The British set up a system of prison ships anchored in Brooklyn's Wallabout Bay, where more American patriot soldiers and civilian captives died than on all the battlefields, combined.
- 1780 – Fort Brooklyn constructed in Brooklyn Heights area along east bank of the East River by the British Army, then occupying New York Town and Manhattan, near Fort Stirling (named for Patriot general, also called "Lord Stirling"). Later razed for housing development by 1823–1825.
- 1783 – "Evacuation Day", November 25, British forces leave New York and Manhattan under terms of Treaty of Paris after occupation of seven years. Gen. George Washington and his officers of the Continental Army take control.
- 1786 – Erasmus Hall High School – oldest public high school in the city, founded as Erasmus Hall Academy, a private school. Later joined by free academy in the 1840s as the first public high school, which later becomes City College of New York. Wooden schoolhouse was opened in 1787. Later wings were added and removed.
- 1788 – New York State debates and ratifies the new Constitution to replace the previous Articles of Confederation and Perpetual Union.
- 1790 – Small population recorded for the villages of Brooklyn and Brooklyn Heights on the western end of Long Island in the first decennial United States Census of 1790.
- 1797 – Population: 1,603 recorded in newly published reference book The American Gazetteer.

== 19th century ==
=== 1800s ===
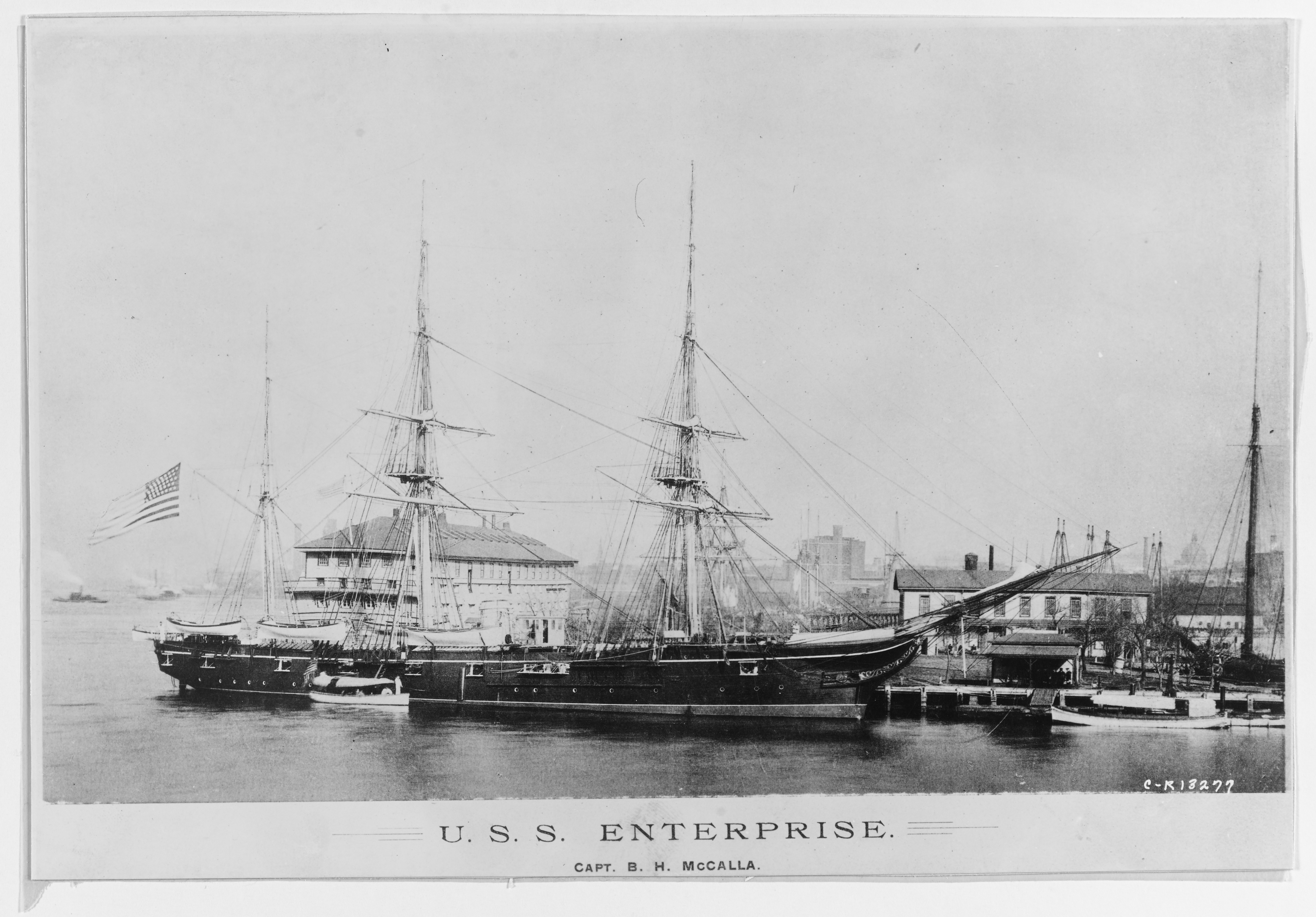
The screw sloop-of-war USS Enterprise docked at the shipyard, ca. 1890.

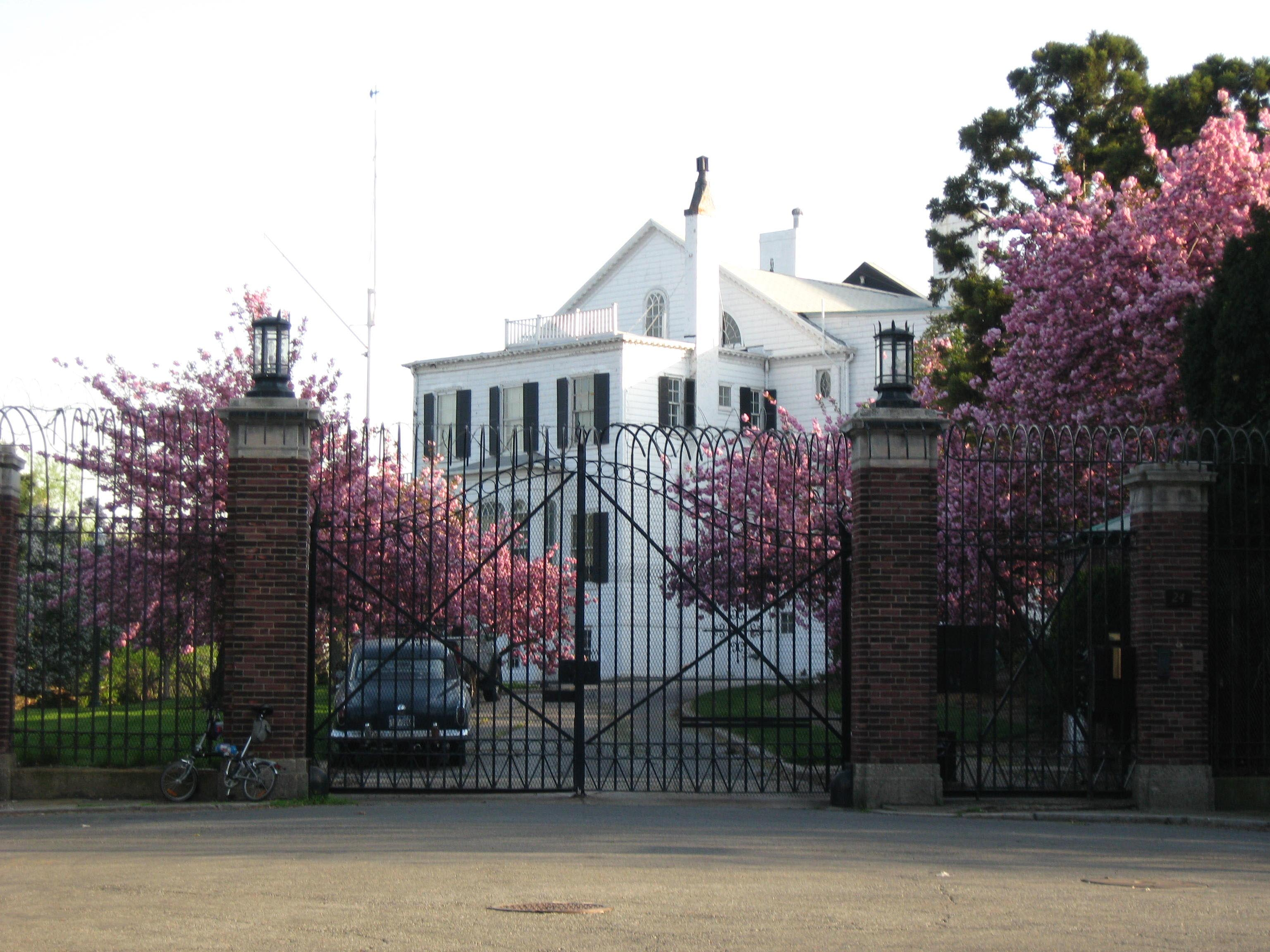
Quarters 'A', Brooklyn Navy Yard

- 1800 – small population for the budding village on the western end of Long Island, recorded in the 1800 United States census
- 1801 – Brooklyn Navy Yard established and begins construction along the eastern bank of the East River by the new United States Department of the Navy. Was repeatedly enlarged in the next century and a half.
- 1804 – Martin Kalbfleisch (February 8, 1804 – February 12, 1873) manufacturer, Mayor of the City of Brooklyn from 1861 to 1863, including the time of the American Civil War and again after the war from 1867 to 1871. Later a United States representative from Brooklyn.
- 1805-06 – "Quarters 'A'" built as residence of the Commander of the Brooklyn Navy Yard.
- John Ward Hunter (October 15, 1807 – April 16, 1900) was born in Bedford (now known as Bedford-Stuyvesant), Brooklyn and in 1875 and 1876 was Mayor of Brooklyn.
- 1809 – Long Island Star newspaper begins publication.
- 1810 – Henry C. Murphy is born in Brooklyn, (1810–1882) Mayor of Brooklyn in 1842.

=== 1810s ===
- 1816
  - The incorporation under the laws and Constitution of the State of New York of the Village of Brooklyn.
  - Population of the town of Brooklyn about 4,500.
- 1819 – Casemate Fort, Whiting Quadrangle was designed in 1819 and built between 1825 and 1836. It is a historic building located in Fort Hamilton, in Brooklyn. and was listed on the National Register of Historic Places in 1974.

=== 1820s ===
- 1820 – Ohio (1820) is launched from the Brooklyn Navy Yard. Missions include suppressing the slave trade off the coast of west Africa.
- 1823 – Brooklyn Apprentices' Library Association formed. ** After the occupying British evacuation, Fort Brooklyn was leveled between 1823 and 1825 for development.
- 1827 – James Street Market built.
- 1828 – New Utrecht Reformed Church established and is the fourth oldest church in Brooklyn. In 1828, The present church was built in 1828 of stones taken from the original church, built in 1700.
- 1829 – Coney Island House opens.

=== 1830s ===
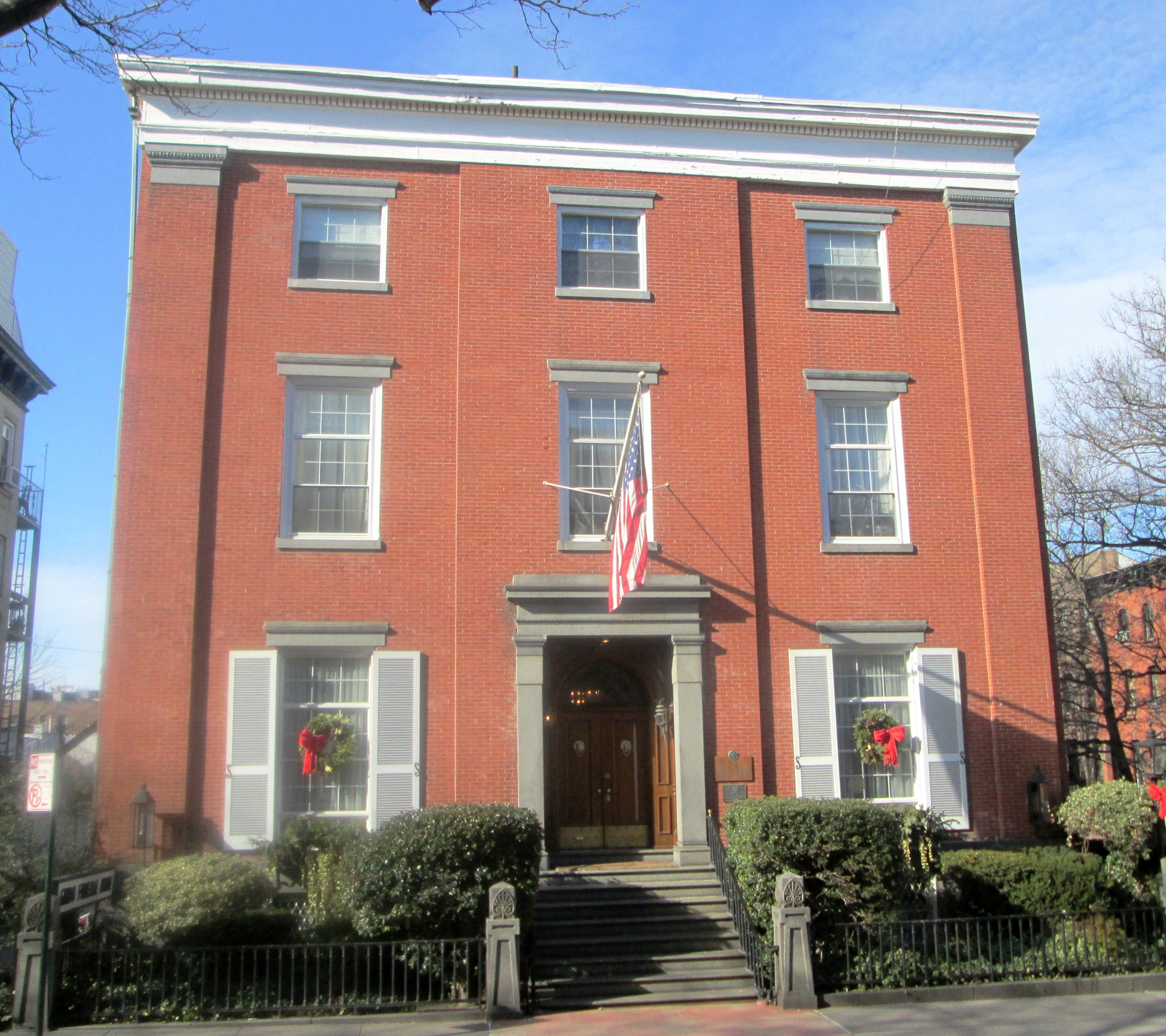
John Rankin House at 440 Clinton Street, constructed in 1840

- 1830
  - Construction starts on what would become the Fulton Ferry District Today the area holds many popular attractions and is listed on the National Register of Historic Places.
- 1833
  - First Unitarian Congregational Society established, designed by architect Minard Lafever, marking the beginning of the Gothic Revival style of architecture in Brooklyn.
  - U.S. Naval Lyceum founded, (precursor to the U.S. Naval Academy in Annapolis, Maryland), Commodore Matthew C. Perry is instrumental in its founding.
- 1834
  - Village of Brooklyn, and now growing town, is incorporated as a city.
  - Old First Reformed Church built.
  - George Hall is elected as the First Mayor of the new City of Brooklyn and served just one year, 1834.
  - Population 23,310.
- 1835
  - Jonathan Trotter is elected the second Mayor of Brooklyn and served from 1835 to 1836.
  - The Brooklyn Lyceum, later the Brooklyn Institute, is built at the intersection of Washington Street and Concord Streets.
- 1837
  - The 9-gun, side-wheel steamer USS Fulton (Fulton II) is launched from the Brooklyn Navy Yard and is the first U.S. Navy steam-powered warship assigned to sea duty.
  - Jeremiah Johnson is elected the third Mayor of Brooklyn and served from 1837 to 1838.
- 1838
  - Green-Wood Cemetery established.
  - James Weeks, an African-American freedman from Virginia, buys the land which marks the beginning of Weeksville, which grows to be the largest independent Negro town in the nation before the Civil War
- 1839 – Cyrus P. Smith is elected the Mayor of Brooklyn and served from 1839 to 1841.

=== 1840s ===
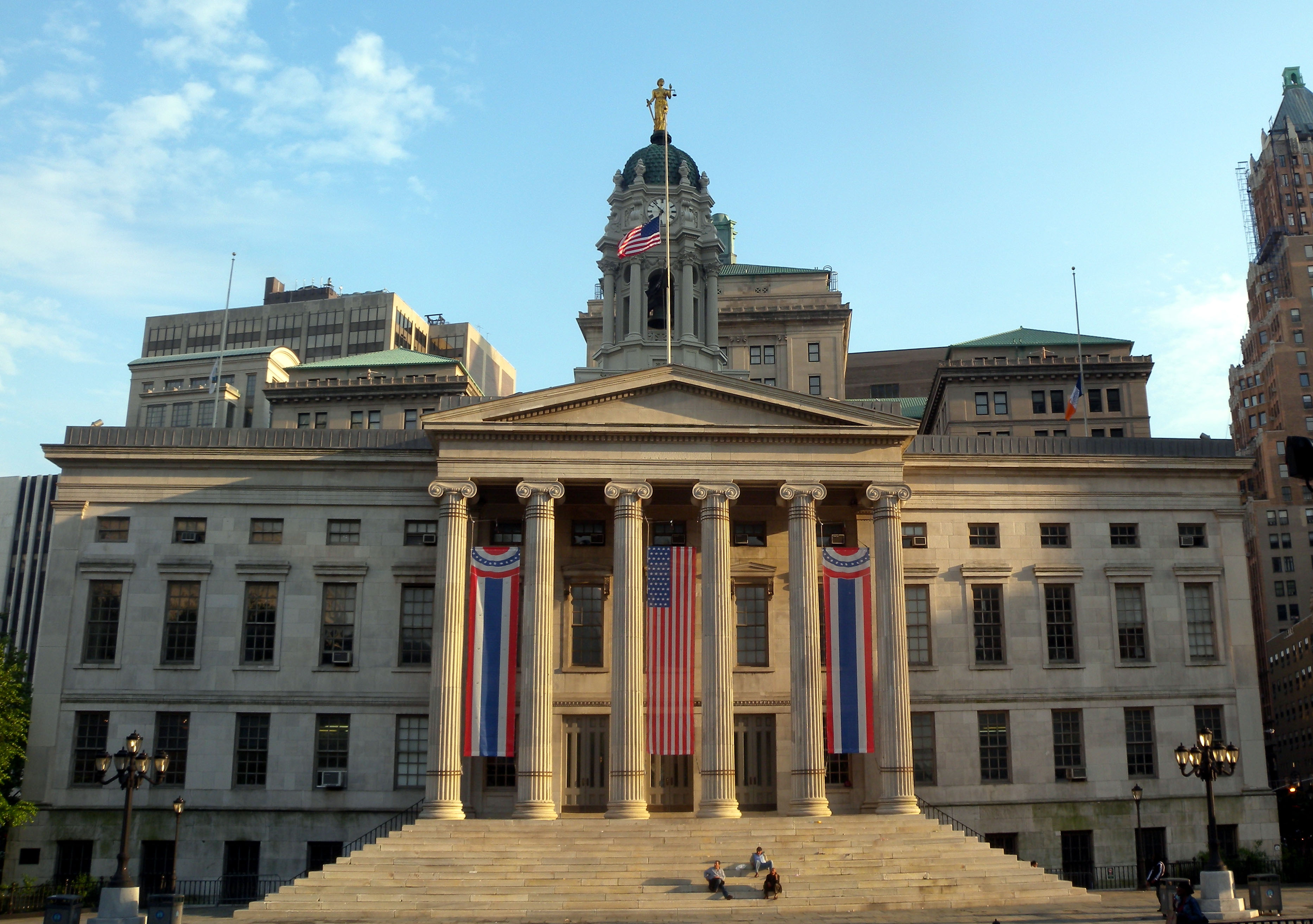
Brooklyn Borough Hall

- 1840
  - John Rankin House (Brooklyn, New York) – Greek Revival. Designated New York City landmark in 1970, National Register of Historic Places in 1978.
  - Fort Greene Historic District, townhouses built between 1840 and 1890. The park was built on the site of fortifications built in 1776 and 1814. Also located in the district is the Brooklyn Academy of Music. It was listed on the National Register of Historic Places in 1983 and expanded in 1984.
- 1841
  - Brooklyn Daily Eagle newspaper begins publication in October, endures until 1955, with a revival in 1962–1963 and after 1996 by different owners.
  - U.S. Department of the Navy at the Brooklyn Navy Yard begins 10-year project to build its third granite dry dock. First use of a steam-powered pile driver in the United States.
- 1843
  - The Brooklyn Institute formed.
  - Joseph Sprague is elected the Mayor of Brooklyn and served from 1843 to 1844.
- 1844 – Bridge Street Methodist Church of the Bridge Street Methodist Church built.
- 1845
  - Brooklyn Female Academy, (later Packer Collegiate Institute) established.
  - Thomas G. Talmage is elected the Mayor of Brooklyn and just served one year, 1845.
  - Boerum Hill Historic District (later historic district) in Boerum Hill, Brooklyn begins construction. and is listed on the National Register of Historic Places.
- 1846 – Francis B. Stryker is elected the Mayor of Brooklyn and served from 1846 to 1848.
- 1847
  - Church of the Holy Trinity (later merges with St. Ann Church) built.
  - Central Presbyterian Church (previously Brooklyn Tabernacle) established.
  - State Street Houses, 23 rowhouses built between 1847 and 1874 on State Street between Smith and Hoyt Streets in the Boerum Hill neighborhood.
- 1848
  - Cypress Hills Cemetery established.
  - Hawkins Circulating Library begins its business and literary operations.
  - Brooklyn Borough Hall was built as the City Hall & designed by architects Calvin Pollard and Gamaliel King in the Greek Revival style of architecture, and constructed of Tuckahoe marble.
- 1849
  - Cemetery of the Evergreens established.
  - Edward Copland is elected the Mayor of Brooklyn and served until 1850.

=== 1850s ===
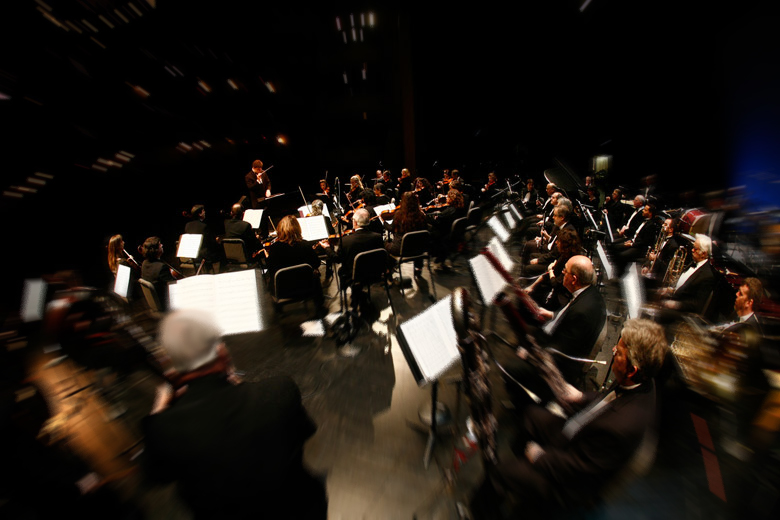
Philharmonic Society of Brooklyn

- 1850
  - Plymouth Church built.
  - Brooklyn Law Library founded.
  - An area later designated as the Greenpoint Historic District was built up between 1850 and 1900. & is listed on the National Register of Historic Places.
  - Samuel Smith is elected the Mayor of Brooklyn and just served one year, 1850.
  - Population: 138,882.
- 1851
  - Conklin Brush is elected the Mayor of Brooklyn from 1851 to 1852.
- 1852
  - Brooklyn Athenaeum and Reading Room founded. In 1869 it merged with the Mercantile Library. In 1878 the amalgamated libraries were renamed as the present Brooklyn Public Library.
  - At the Brooklyn Navy Yard, a young Naval Surgeon named E. R. Squibb seeks assignment to the Naval Hospital where he perfects manufacture of an anesthetic known as "ether".
  - Construction starts on the South Bushwick Reformed Presbyterian Dutch Church, (a.k.a. the "White Church"), later placed on the National Register of Historic Places in 1982. It was listed on the National Register of Historic Places in 1982.
  - Seth Low (1850–1916), born in Brooklyn and was the Mayor of Brooklyn from 1882 to 1885
- 1853
  - Brooklyn Branch of the YMCA (Young Men's Christian Association) established, later part of YMCA of Greater New York.
  - Roman Catholic Diocese of Brooklyn established.
  - Edward A. Lambert is elected the Mayor of Brooklyn from 1853 to 1854.
  - Brooklyn, Baltimore, named specifically after the New York town, established in Maryland. Later cities and towns adopt "Brooklyn" name, or "Brooklyn Park", "Brooklyn Heights", "Brooklyn Center", and "New Brooklyn" in Ohio, Minnesota, etc.
- 1854
  - Packer Collegiate Institute opens.
  - "Brooklyn Excelsiors", one of organized professional baseball's first teams formed.
  - Lawrence & Foulks shipyard in operation in Williamsburg area of Brooklyn.
- 1855
  - Additional geographic areas of Bushwick, Greenpoint, and Williamsburg become part of the City of Brooklyn.
  - "Brooklyn Atlantics" baseball team formed as another early club of newly-organizing baseball.
  - Brooklyn Polytechnic Institute opens and become a nationally renowned mathematical, engineering and scientific institution.
  - George Hall is elected the Mayor of Brooklyn from 1855 to 1856.
- 1857
  - Several young men with merchants, manufacturers, business people establish the Brooklyn Mercantile Library Association of the City of Brooklyn, which later merged with others and became the Brooklyn Public Library.
  - Friends Meetinghouse built, with later addition of school, by Society of Friends ("Quakers").
  - Philharmonic Society of Brooklyn (and later Brooklyn Philharmonic Symphony Orchestra) formed.
  - Naval Surgeon E. R. Squibb starts his own pharmaceutical company outside the Brooklyn Navy Yard, which provides the majority of medical supplies for the Union Army during the Civil War.
  - Construction starts on Hanson Place Baptist Church, later called Hanson Place Seventh-day Adventist Church. The church was designated a New York City landmark in 1970, and was listed on the National Register of Historic Places in 1980.
  - Samuel S. Powell is elected the Mayor of Brooklyn from 1857 to 1860.
- 1858
  - Ridgewood Reservoir constructed, providing additional water capacity for waterworks system for Brooklyn.
  - Second Unitarian Church built.
  - The Brooklyn Navy Yard-built USS Niagara and the British Royal Navy's HMS Agamemnon meet mid-ocean, making the first attempt to lay the first Transatlantic telegraph cable. It soon breaks down.
- 1859
  - St. Francis College established.
  - Larry Corcoran, an especially skilled American pitcher in early Major League Baseball born in Brooklyn. Credited with creating first method of signaling pitches to his catcher.

=== 1860s ===
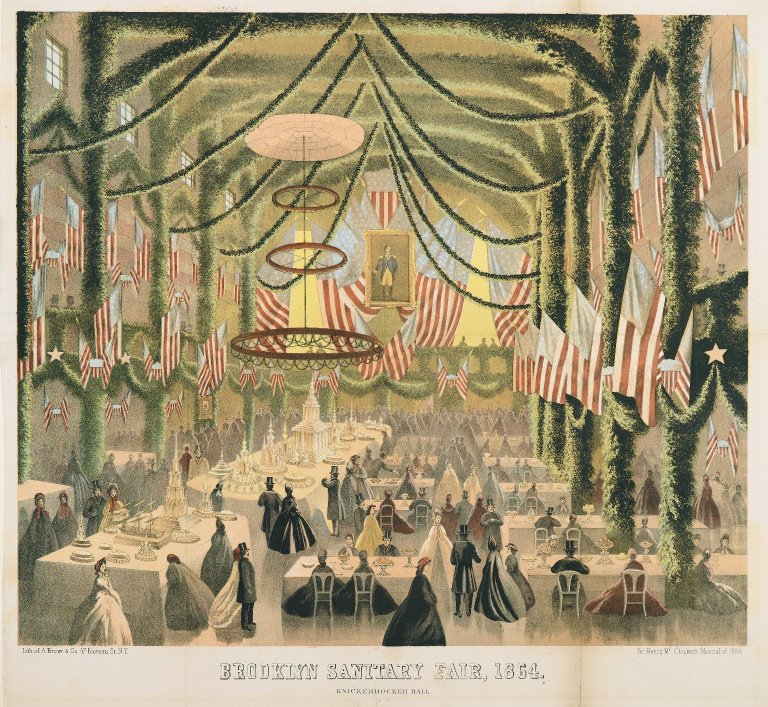
Brooklyn Sanitary Fair, Knickerbocker Hall, 1864

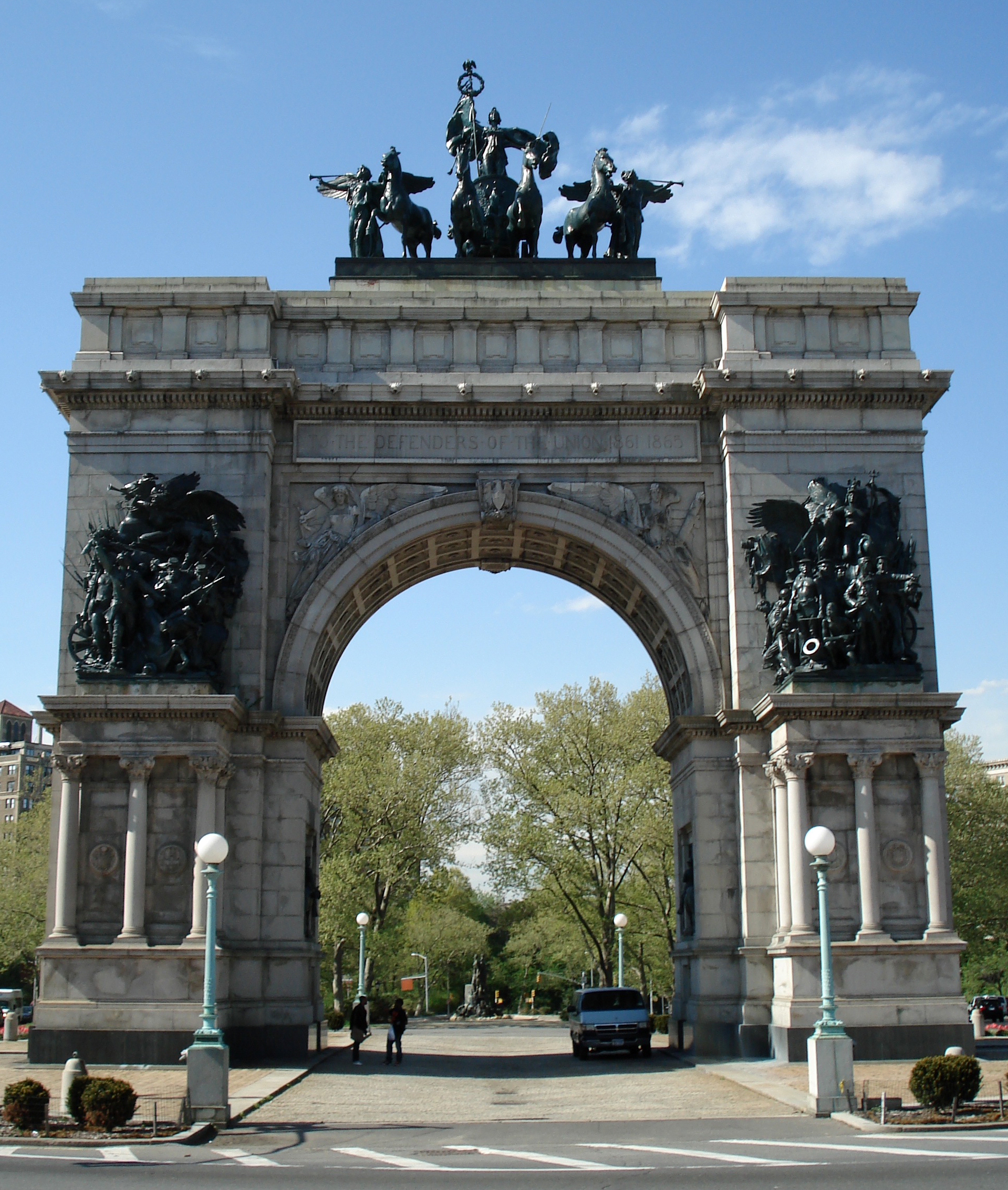
Soldiers' and Sailors' Arch at Grand Army Plaza

- 1860
  - Population: 266,661.
  - Kings County Savings Bank built 1860–1868 in French Second Empire style. Now a landmark in Williamsburg, Brooklyn.
- 1861
  - Brooklyn Academy of Music is inaugurated; presents its first performance
  - Martin Kalbfleisch becomes Mayor.
  - Brooklyn played a major role with its industrial resources and vast population in supplying troops and materiel for the American Civil War, with such regiments as the 14th Brooklyn, known as the "Red Legged Devils". They fought from 1861 to 1864 and wore red the entire war.
- 1862
  - Court House built.
  - Park Theatre opens.
  - Coney Island and Brooklyn Railroad begins operating.
  - Cypress Hills National Cemetery the only United States National Cemetery in New York City, established to honor Civil War veterans. It also has graves of soldiers who fought in the American Revolutionary War, Spanish–American War, Korean War and Vietnam War.
  - Continental Iron Works, builder of revolutionary naval iron-clad warship USS Monitor, established on East River waterfront.
- 1863 – Long Island Historical Society (later known as the Brooklyn Historical Society) founded.
- 1864
  - Brooklyn Sanitary Fair held to provide relief funds and medical supplies along with orphan and widows' assistance for Civil War soldiers, sailors and veterans, held by the United States Sanitary Commission.
  - Dime Savings Bank of Williamsburgh incorporated.
  - Alfred M. Wood (April 19, 1825 – July 28, 1895), the Mayor of Brooklyn from 1864 to 1865 & was an officer in the 14th Brooklyn during the Civil War.
- 1865
  - Tilyou's Surf House established, Coney Island.
  - Prospect Heights Historic District, built between 1865 and about 1900 in a variety of architectural styles popular in the late-19th century. It was listed on the National Register of Historic Places in 1983.
- 1866
  - St. Paul's Church built.
  - Samuel Rooth is elected the Mayor of Brooklyn from 1866 to 1867.
- 1867
  - Brooklyn Friends School is founded by the Religious Society of Friends as a coeducational Quaker school.
  - Grand Army Plaza laid out in commemoration of the victorious Union Army and its subsequent veterans organization, the Grand Army of the Republic.
  - Charles Pratt and Company formed.
  - Prospect Park, a 585-acre park in Brooklyn and designed by famous architects Frederick Law Olmsted & Calvert Vaux.
  - St. Paul's Episcopal Church, built 1867–1884, designed by Richard Upjohn & Son in the High Victorian Gothic style. It was added to the National Register of Historic Places in 1989.
- 1868 – Quaker Meeting House built.
- 1869
  - Brooklyn Fire Department founded.
  - Gowanus Canal built.
  - Adelphi Academy chartered.

=== 1870s ===
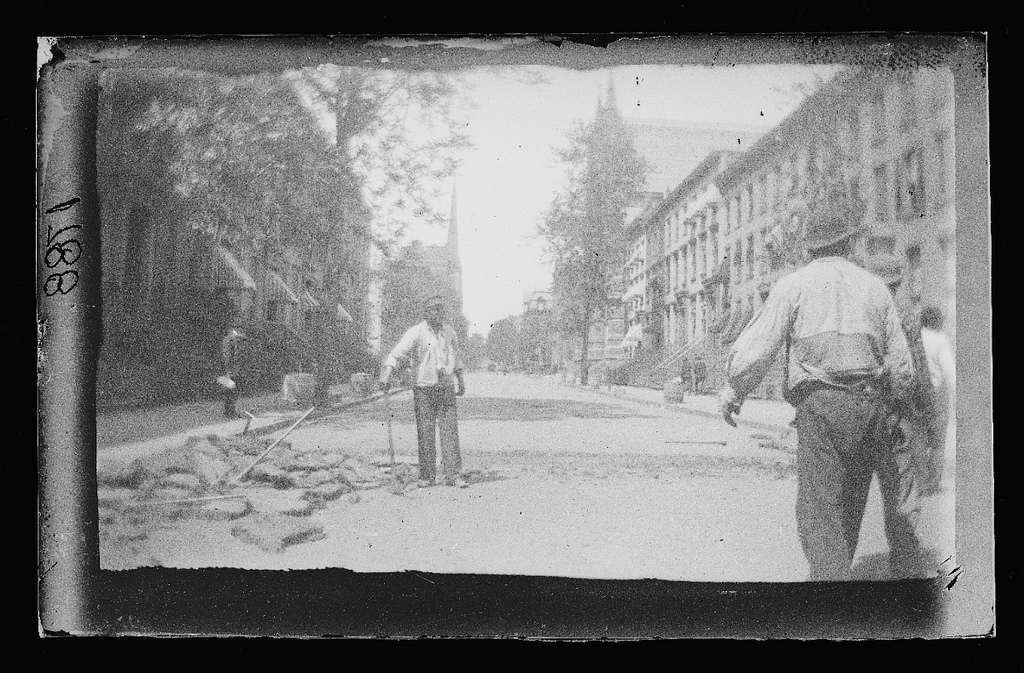
Repaving Clinton Street, ca. 1872–1887

- 1870
  - St. John's College opens.
  - Population of the city of Brooklyn in the 1870 United States census: 396,099.
  - Construction starts on what is now the Stuyvesant Heights Historic District, in the Bedford-Stuyvesant neighborhood. Buildings are mostly two and three-story rowhouses with high basements, with a few multiple dwellings and institutional structures.
- 1873
  - Samuel S. Powell is elected the Mayor of Brooklyn from 1872 to 1873.
- 1874
  - Construction starts on Ocean Parkway (Brooklyn) & extends over a distance of about five miles (8 km), running almost north to south from the vicinity of Prospect Park to Brighton Beach.
  - Construction starts on Flatbush Town Hall, a historic town hall, designed by John Y. Culyer in the High Victorian Gothic style in the Ruskinian mode. It is a two-story masonry building on a stone foundation, and features a three-story bell tower with a steep hip roof.
- 1875
  - Williamsburgh Savings Bank is built and designed by George B. Post and today is a New York City Landmarks and on the National Register of Historic Places.
- 1876
  - Brooklyn Theater Fire
  - Frederick A. Schroeder is the Mayor of Brooklyn from 1876 to 1877.
- 1878
  - Brighton Beach Line begins operating.
  - Brighton Beach Hotel opens.
  - James Howell is elected the Mayor of Brooklyn from 1878 to 1881.
- 1879
  - Brighton Beach Race Course opens.
  - Gage and Tollner restaurant opens.

=== 1880s ===
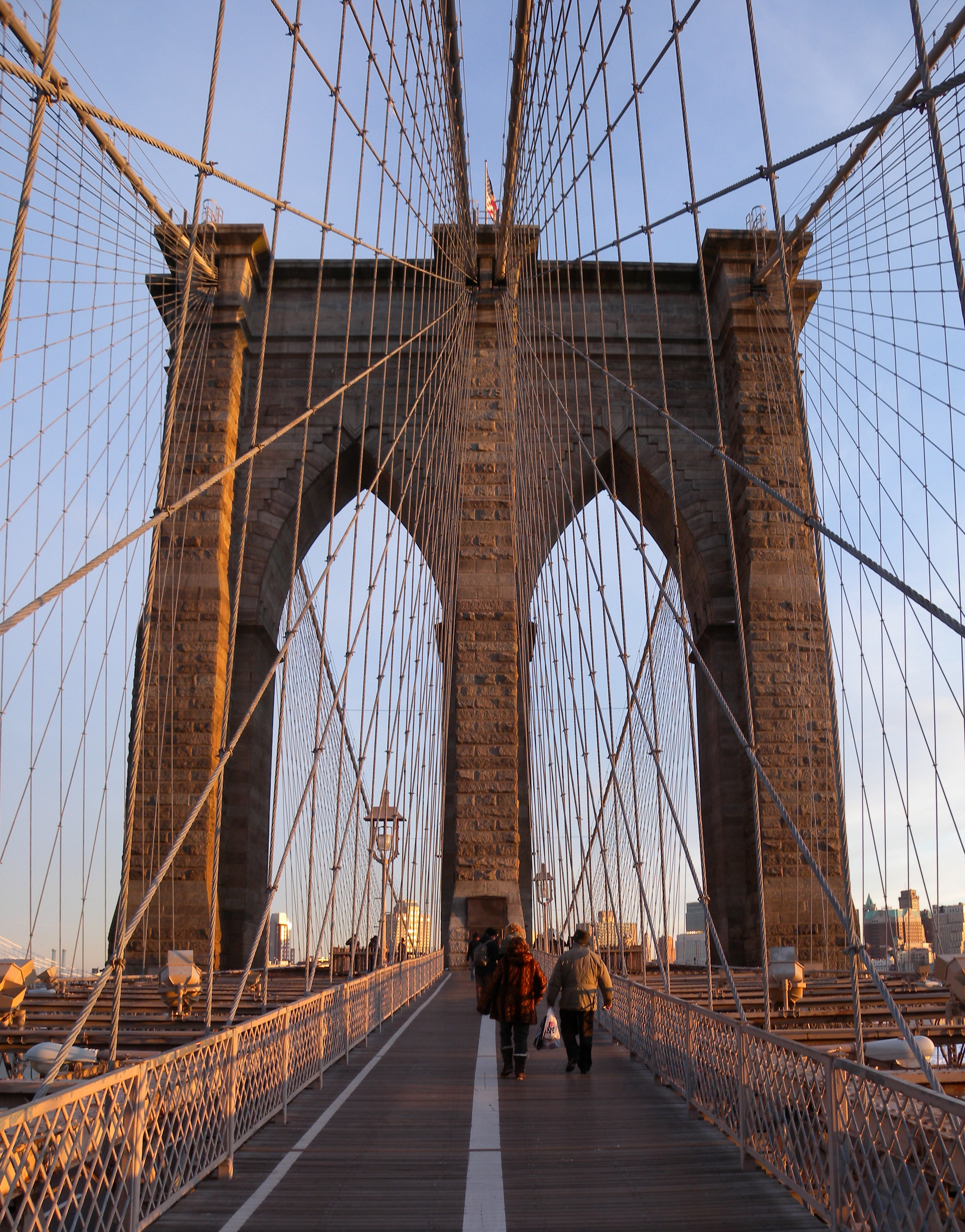
Brooklyn Bridge

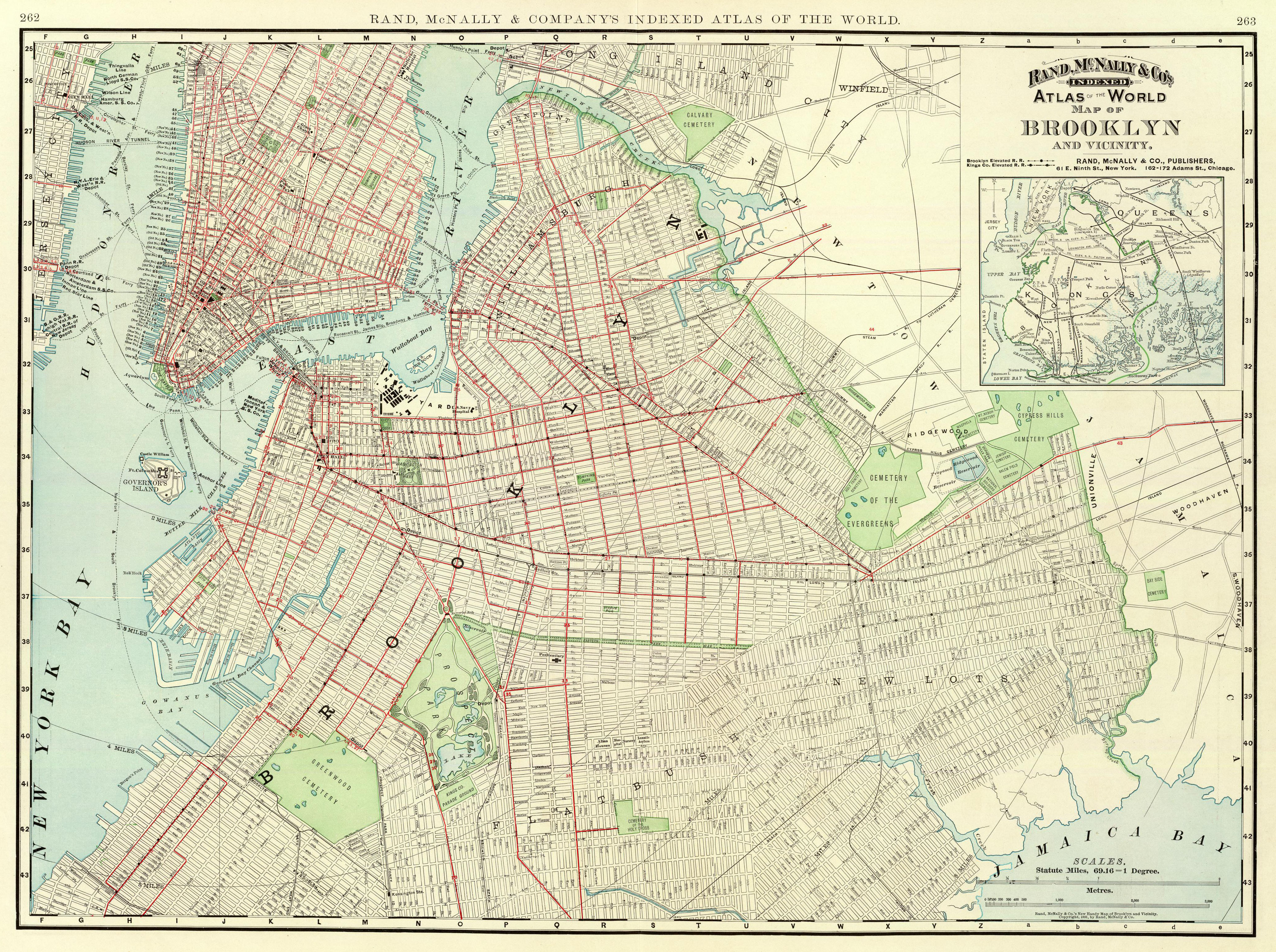
City of Brooklyn as mapped in 1897, before consolidation with Greater New York

- 1880
  - Weir Greenhouse in Sunset Park was built in 1880 and significantly rebuilt and enlarged in 1895. It was listed on the National Register of Historic Places in 1984.
  - Population: 599,495.
- 1881 - The Grand Opera House gives its inaugural performance on November 14, 1881.
- 1883
  - Brooklyn Bridge opens, spanning the lower East River from New York's Manhattan Island near South Street Seaport vicinity to the Brooklyn Heights.
  - Brooklyn Grays baseball team formed.
  - Brooklyn Beef Company begins business.
- 1884
  - Famous author and humorist Mark Twain (Samuel L. Clemens) and George W. Cable entertain with readings and storytelling at the Brooklyn Academy of Music.
- 1885 – Brooklyn Elevated Railroad begins operating.
- 1886
  - New Lots becomes part of Brooklyn.
  - 75th Police Precinct Station House is a three-story, yellow brick building in the Romanesque Revival.
  - 68th Police Precinct Station House and Stable, a three-story brick building with carved stone detailing in the Romanesque Revival style.
  - Daniel D. Whitney served as Mayor of Brooklyn from 1886 to 1887.
- 1887
  - Pratt Institute, and Luger's Café established.
  - St. George's Protestant Episcopal Church was built in 1887 in the Gothic Revival style of architecture. It is constructed of red brick with light stone trim in a cruciform plan.
  - Brooklyn Academy of Photography incorporated.
- 1888
  - Old First Reformed Church, in Park Slope construction started. The church was listed on the National Register of Historic Places in 1998.
  - Church of St. Luke and St. Matthew (Brooklyn, New York) was built in 1888–91 as St. Luke's Protestant Episcopal Church and was designed by John Welch in the Romanesque Revival style.
  - Alfred C. Chapin is elected the Mayor of Brooklyn from 1888 to 1891.
- 1889
  - Elliott Buckmaster (1889–1976) – military person; U.S. Navy officer; naval aviator during World War I and World War II was born in Brooklyn.
  - Brooklyn Society of Amateur Photographers organized.
  - Montauk Club established.

=== 1890s ===
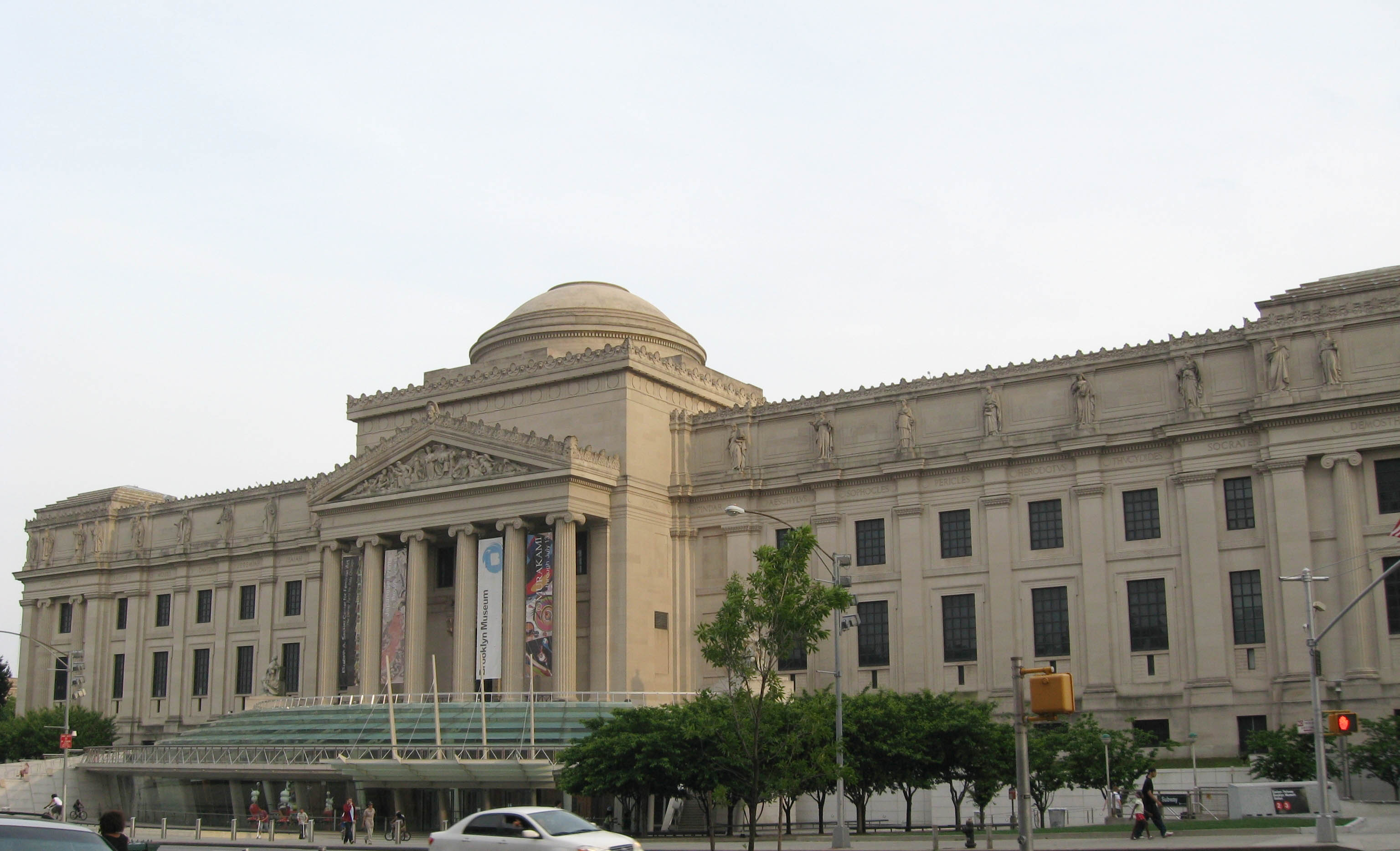
The Brooklyn Museum (exterior shown) was founded in 1895

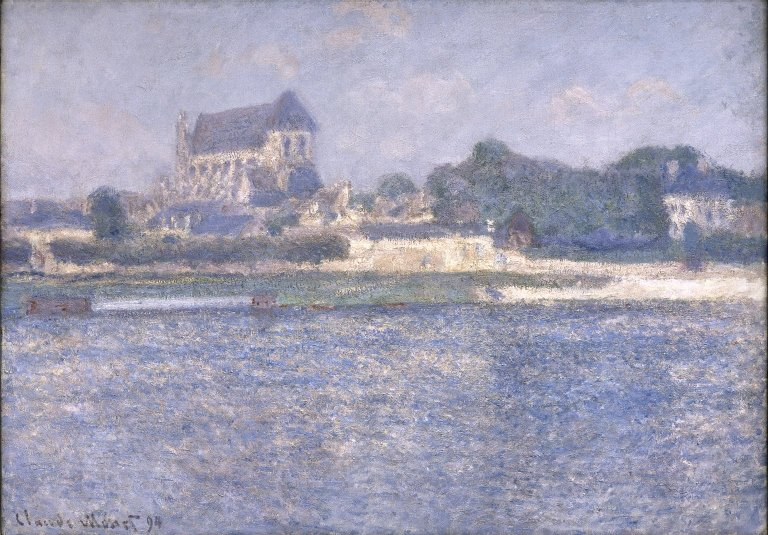
Claude Monet, The Church at Vernon, (1894), The Brooklyn Museum.

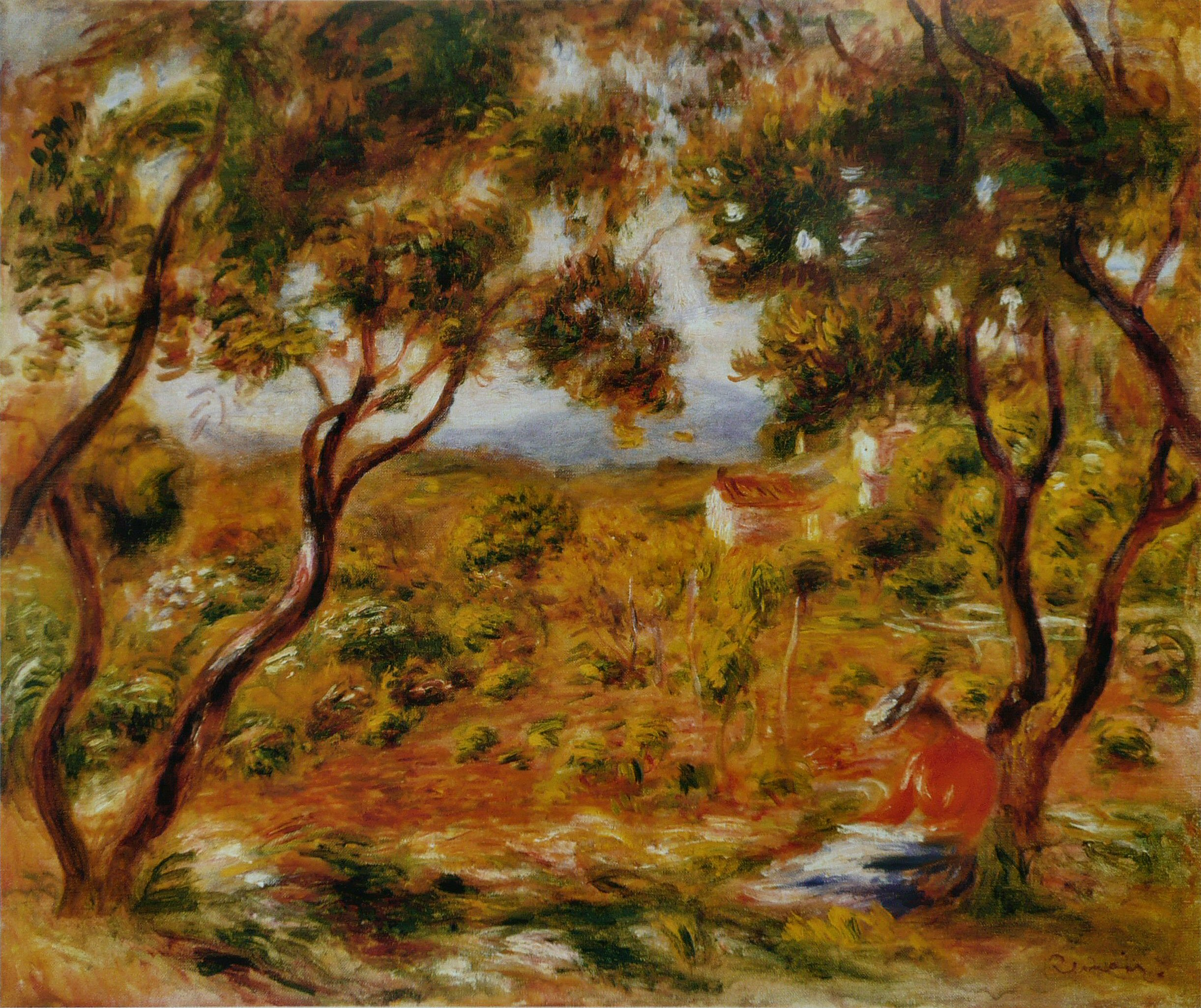
Pierre-Auguste Renoir, Les Vignes à Cagnes, (1908), The Brooklyn Museum

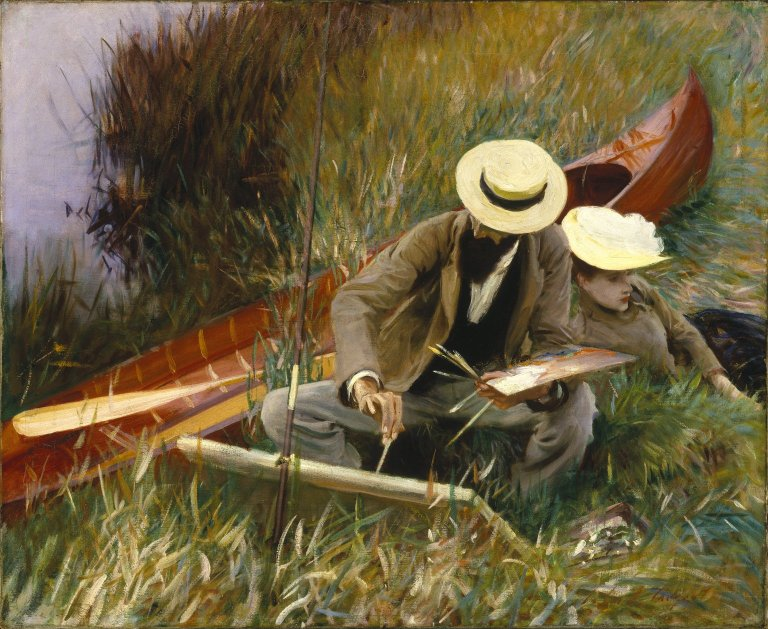
John Singer Sargent, Paul César Helleu Sketching with His Wife, (1889), at The Brooklyn Museum.

- 1890
  - Population: 838,547, according to the 1890 United States census, making Brooklyn the fourth largest city in America.
  - The U.S. Navy Department at the Brooklyn Navy Yard on the East River, launches a battleship of a new generation, the Maine (ACR-1). Eight years later its explosion triggered the short Spanish–American War.
- 1891
  - Old First Reformed Church built.
  - Boy's High School built and today is regarded as "one of Brooklyn's finest buildings".
  - 23rd Regiment Armory, in Crown Heights area, built 1891–95. Placed on the New York City Landmarks list and the National Register of Historic Places administered by the National Park Service, of the U.S. Department of the Interior
  - Rockwood Chocolate Factory Historic District, buildings built by Van Glahn Brothers and Rockwood & Company between 1891 and 1928. Much of the industrial complex has since been converted to loft apartments. It was listed on the National Register of Historic Places in 1983.
  - African-American (then called "colored" or "Negro") educator and activist Booker T. Washington (1856–1915), president of the Tuskegee Institute in Tuskegee, Alabama delivers a speech on full emancipation of the race at the Brooklyn Academy of Music.
  - United States Navy rear admiral George H. Cooper dies and is buried
- 1892
  - Soldiers' and Sailors' Arch dedicated to the memory of the veterans and the casualties from the Civil War of which the people and resources of Brooklyn, played a large part.
  - Renaissance Apartments, at Hancock Street and Nostrand Avenue in the Bedford-Stuyvesant community constructed.
  - Construction starts on the Grand Prospect Hall, banquet hall in Park Slope. A four-story building in the French Renaissance style of architecture. and was listed on the National Register of Historic Places in 1999.
  - The parish house was built at the New Utrecht Reformed Church.
  - David A. Boody is elected the Mayor of Brooklyn from 1892 to 1893.
- 1893
  - Andrews Methodist Church (later United Methodist) built.
  - Burlesque, vaudeville and motion pictures star of the 20th Century, Mae West is born in Brooklyn, an American actress, singer, playwright, screenwriter and sex symbol whose entertainment career spanned seven decades.
  - Andrews Methodist Church (later United Methodist), a one-story, asymmetrical orange brick church with massive rose window and a three-story, square bell tower.
  - Baptist Temple is designed in the Romanesque Revival style of architecture and features a large rose window and three corner towers.
  - Category 3 hurricane destroys buildings in Coney Island and Brighton Beach.
- 1894
  - Towns of Flatbush, Gravesend, and New Utrecht become part of the City of Brooklyn.
  - Eastern District High School opens.
  - Baptist Temple building completed.
  - 83rd Precinct Police Station and Stable for the Brooklyn City Police was built in the Romanesque Revival style.
  - Charles A. Schieren is elected the Mayor of Brooklyn from 1894 to 1895.
- 1895
  - The Brooklyn Museum founded in a building of 560,000 square feet (52,000 m^{2}), planned to be the largest art museum in the world.
  - Brooklyn trolley strike disrupts commerce; National Guard keeps order.
- 1896
  - Brooklyn Public Library established, separate from the New York Public Library system.
  - Brooklyn's expansion of its population and commercial/residential and industrial development had reached its natural municipal boundaries at the Kings County line with almost all of the available territory being "urbanized".
  - Lefferts Manor established, later becomes a national historic district in Prospect Lefferts Gardens, Flatbush.
  - Frederick W. Wurster is elected and later becomes the last Mayor of Brooklyn. His office is replaced by the Brooklyn Borough President and the Brooklyn City Hall becomes the Brooklyn Borough Hall.
- 1898 – (1 January) City of Brooklyn becomes one of five boroughs (Manhattan, The Bronx, Queens, Staten Island), of the new reorganized City of Greater New York, with a new municipal charter after a long controversy, debate and campaign through the 1890s. Consolidation was opposed by the city's main daily newspaper, the Brooklyn Daily Eagle.
- 1899
  - Grace Methodist Episcopal Church built, (later becomes Bay Ridge United Methodist Church).
  - Christ English Evangelical Lutheran Church built in Romanesque Revival architectural style on Lafayette Avenue in Bedford-Stuyvesant. Later becomes Rugged Cross Baptist Church and placed on the National Register of Historic Places by the U.S. Department of the Interior.
  - 1920s and early 1930s Chicago gangster and liquor smuggler against Prohibition of the 18th Amendment, Al Capone is born in Park Slope, Brooklyn.
  - Prospect Park South begins construction, exclusively for large and expensive houses.
  - Saitta House, a two-and-a-half-story, one-family, Queen Anne style of architecture of English-type timbered and stucco dwelling construction on 84th Street, between 11th and 12th Streets, in Dyker Heights, completed ca. 1899 by architect John J. Petit and builder P.J. la Note for Simone and Beatrice Saitta (pronounced: sigh-eat-a).
  - Al Capone is born in Brooklyn to Italian immigrants and was an American gangster who attained fame during the Prohibition era.
  - Walter Berndt (November 22, 1899Brooklyn, New York was a cartoonist known for his long-run comic strip, Smitty, which he drew for 50 years.
- 1900 - Population: 1,166,582.

== 20th century ==
=== 1900s ===
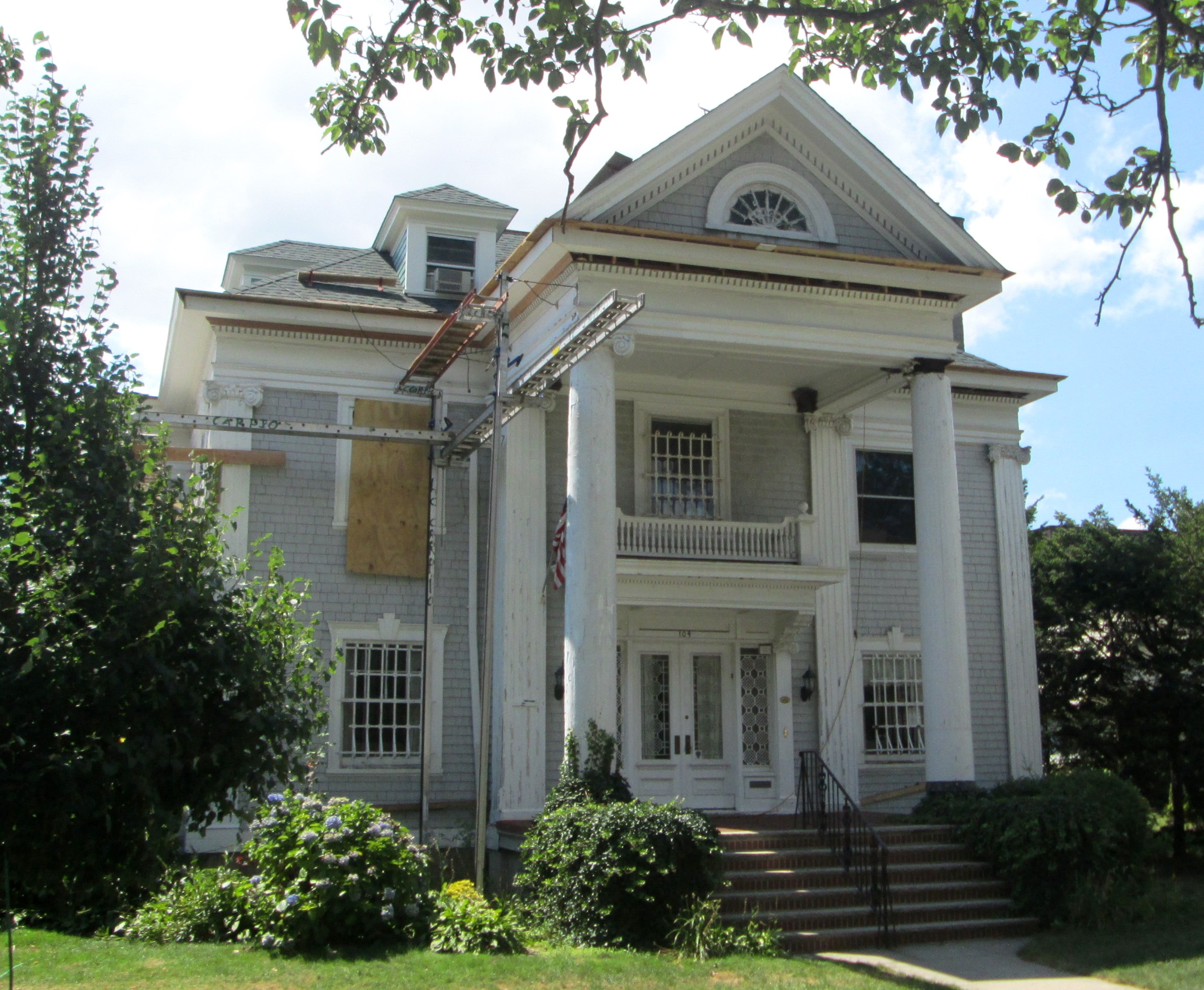
The former Rusell Benedict House (1902) at 104 Buckingham Road in Prospect Park South

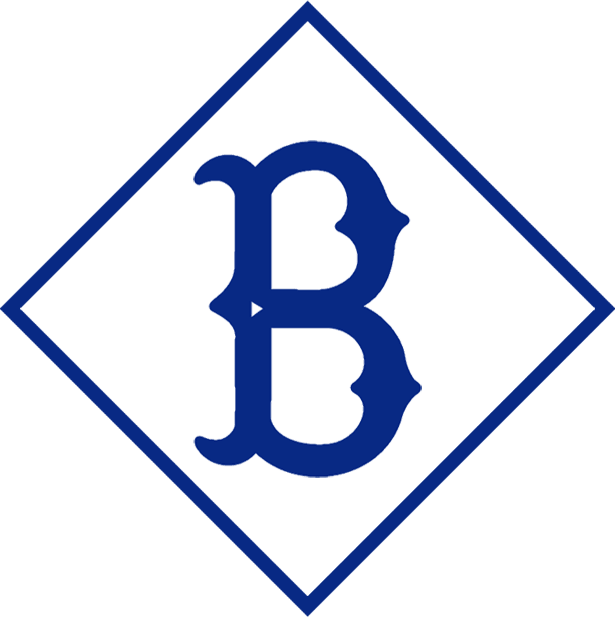
Logo of the Brooklyn Dodgers/Superbas from 1910 through 1913

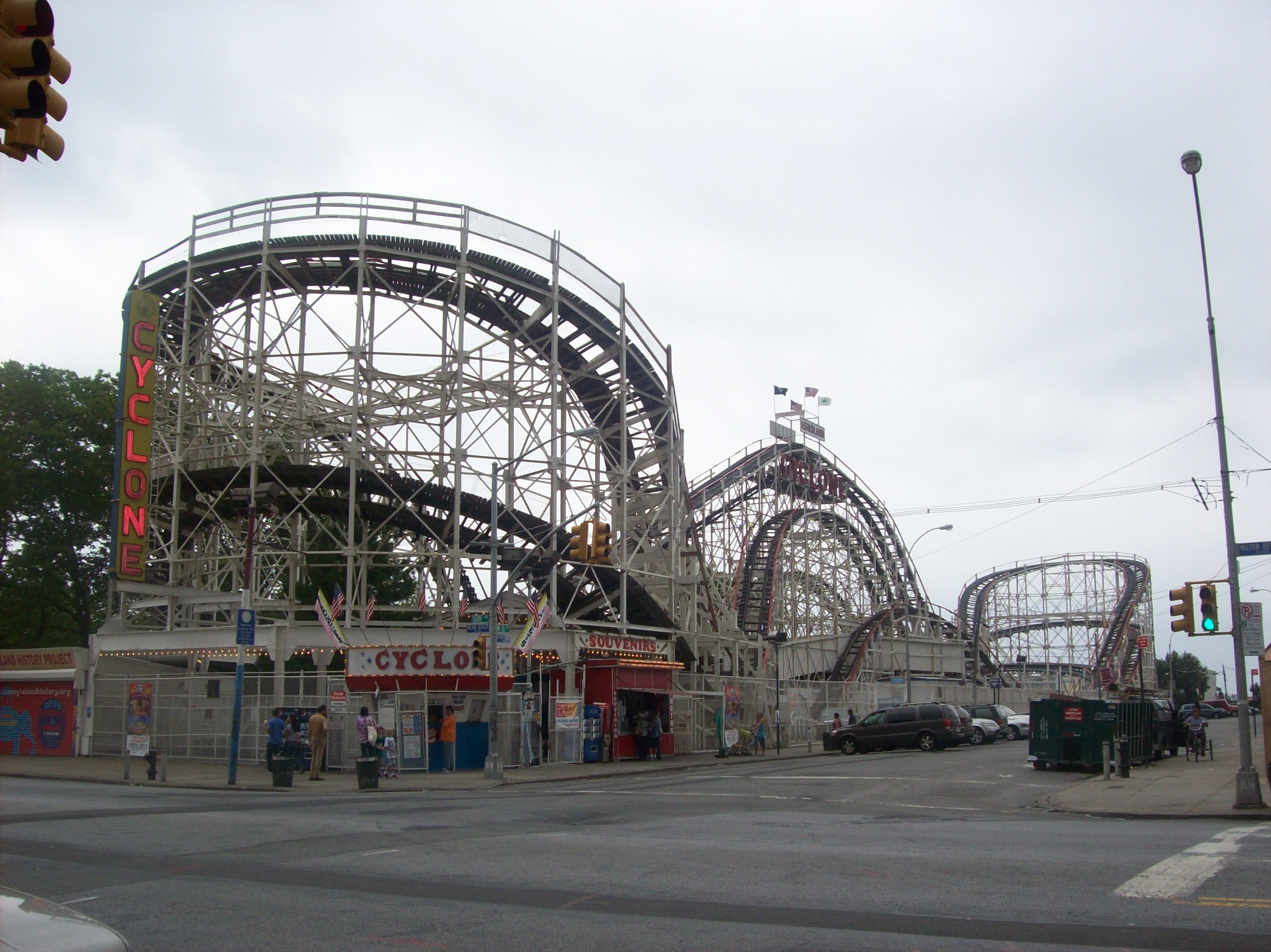
Coney Island "Cyclone" roller-coaster

- 1901
  - Brooklyn Law School founded.
  - Brighton Derby inaugurated.
  - Adelaide Hall (1901–1993) – Jazz singer, songwriter, actress is born in Brooklyn and becomes a major figure in the Harlem Renaissance of African-American artistic performances.
- 1902 – Ditmas Park Historic District, a national historic district in the Ditmas Park area and consists of 172 contributing, largely residential buildings built beginning in 1902 to 1914. and was listed on the National Register of Historic Places in 1983.
- 1903
  - Williamsburg Bridge opens, second major span across East River between Borough of Manhattan and Borough of Brooklyn, constructed of revolutionary steel I-beams assemblage.
  - The Coney Island Polar Bear Club is founded.
  - 1903 to 1911 Dreamland contained primarily freak shows and an ambitious amusement park that was located at Coney Island, Brooklyn.
  - Luna Park is the name of two amusement parks in Coney Island. The first Luna Park existed from 1903 to 1944 on the north side of Surf Avenue. A second Luna Park was opened on the former site of the nearby Astroland amusement park on the south side of Surf Avenue, on May 29, 2010.
- 1905
  - Construction starts on the Boathouse on the Lullwater of the Lake in Prospect Park, which was built in 1905–1907 to a classical design of Helmle, Hudswell and Huberty, protégés of New York architectural firm of McKim, Mead and White.
  - Senator Street Historic District – consisting of 40 contributing residential buildings (including two garages) built between 1906 and 1912. Later added in 2002 to National Register of Historic Places, maintained by National Park Service of U.S. Department of the Interior.
  - The parsonage was built at the New Utrecht Reformed Church.
  - Population: 1,358,686.
- 1907- The first live singing performance over radio, when Eugenia Farrar sang "I Love You Truly" and "Just Awearyin' for You" over Dr. Lee de Forest's Amplitude modulation/arc radiotelephone located atop the Parker Building, which was received by the USS Dolphin's wireless operator, Oliver A. Wyckoff, while docked at Brooklyn Navy Yard.
- 1908 – The Brooklyn Academy of Music moved to its present location. Brooklyn Academy of Music
- 1909
  - Construction is complete on the Manhattan Bridge, third major East River span and a gateway into Brooklyn from Canal Street in lower Manhattan.
  - Shaari Zedek Synagogue was built in 1909–1910, a two-story rectangular brick building with cast stone trim. and is listed on the National Register of Historic Places.

=== 1910s ===
- 1910
  - Brooklyn Botanic Garden founded.
  - Population: 1,634.351.
- 1912 – Brooklyn Music School founded and owns and operates a four-story building located at 126 St. Felix St. that contains twenty-four classrooms, three dance studios, and a 266-seat Spanish Style theatre.
- 1913 – Ebbets Field stadium opens.
- 1914 – Church of St. Francis of Assisi built.
- 1915
  - USS Arizona (BB-39) Launched at the Brooklyn Navy Yard. Sunk on Sunday, December 7, 1941, in the Pearl Harbor attack.
  - Austin, Nichols and Company Warehouse, designed by Cass Gilbert, using reinforced concrete on a huge scale. It is now a listed on the National Register of Historic Places and is currently used as an apartment building.
  - Eli Wallach, actor, was born in Red Hook, Brooklyn, at 156 Union St..
- 1916
  - Jackie Gleason, an American actor, born in Brooklyn.
  - Brooklyn Trust Company built a gigantic building inspired by ancient Roman and Italian Renaissance architecture at 177 Montague Street. The building was landmarked in 1996. The interior is also landmarked. It was listed on the National Register of Historic Places in 2009.
  - Congregational Church of the Evangel, a historic Congregational church in Flatbush, Brooklyn & was built in 1916–1917 and is an asymmetrically massed Late Gothic Revival style building.
  - Storehouse No. 2, U.S. Navy Fleet Supply Base was a United States Navy Fleet supply base that was built during World War I.
  - Construction starts on the Russian Orthodox Cathedral of the Transfiguration of Our Lord in Greenpoint, with designs by Louis Allmendiger and a plan is based on a Greek cross and is designed in the Russian version of the Byzantine style. It was listed on the National Register of Historic Places in 1980.
  - Birth control clinic opens.
- 1917
  - 28th President Woodrow Wilson asks in April U.S. Congress to declare war on German Empire and later Austria-Hungary of Central Powers alliance, entering America into World War I. Industries, commerce and people of New York and Brooklyn enter into war mobilization until Armistice, November 11, 1918.
  - The New York City Subway's BMT Brighton Line (currently the B and Q trains) opens, after being rebuilt from a steam railroad to a rapid transit line.
  - Red Auerbach born. coach of basketball teams including the Boston Celtics.
- 1918
  - Brooklyn Army Terminal is a large complex of warehouses, offices, piers, docks, cranes, rail sidings and cargo loading equipment on 95 acres (38 ha) between 58th and 63rd Streets in waterfront Sunset Park. It is now leased and managed by the New York City Economic Development Corporation as a center for dozens of light manufacturing, warehousing and back-office businesses.
  - New York Congregational Home for the Aged opens in Brooklyn, constructed in three stages; the center section and east pavilion in 1918, west pavilion in 1921, and a west wing in 1927. New York Congregational Home for the Aged was listed on the National Register of Historic Places in 2008.
  - Carlton Avenue YMCA opens.

=== 1920s ===
- 1920 – Temple Beth El of Borough Park, now known as "Young Israel Beth El" of Borough Park, is a historic synagogue in Borough Park, Brooklyn and was built between 1920 and 1923.
- 1921
  - Magen David Synagogue, a Sephardic Jewish synagogue in Brooklyn.
  - Zander Hollander is born in Brooklyn, United Press International journalist and in the mid-1960s by becoming what Sports Illustrated called "the unofficial king of sports paperbacks" — particularly a once wildly popular series of
- 1922 - Brooklyn Tech opens.
- 1924
  - Ocean Parkway Jewish Center, built between 1924 and 1926 and is a stone clad Neoclassical style building.
  - Buddy Hackett [born "Leonard Hacker"]; (August 31, 1924 – June 30, 2003): American comedian and actor in motion pictures, television and live acts and theatre, was born in Brooklyn, New York City, the son of a Jewish upholsterer. He grew up on 54th Street and 14th Avenue in Borough Park.
- 1925
  - Park Slope Jewish Center – known from 1942 to 1960 as Congregation B'nai Jacob – Tifereth Israel, is a Conservative synagogue in South Slope, a 2 1/2-story brick building with Romanseque Revival and Baroque style elements.
  - Young Israel of Flatbush, a historic synagogue in the Midwood neighborhood of Brooklyn that was built between 1925 and 1929 and is a three-story Moorish-inspired style building.
- 1926
  - Born in the Williamsburg section of Brooklyn is actor, director and producer and live stage performances comedian Mel Brooks, who occasionally starred in his own produced features. – actor, comedian, film director, film producer and screenwriter.
  - East Midwood Jewish Center, a Conservative synagogue located at 1625 Ocean Avenue, Midwood section of Brooklyn, construction started in 1926 and was finished in 1929 in the Renaissance revival style of architecture.
- 1927
  - Coney Island Cyclone, a historic wooden roller coaster, that opened on June 26, 1927, in the Coney Island section of Brooklyn facing the Atlantic Ocean resort beaches at a cost of $175,000.
  - Jerry Stiller comedian and actor (born June 8, 1927) in Brooklyn.
  - Beth El Jewish Center of Flatbush opens. It features Byzantine and Gothic Revival decorative elements and is a landmark in the Flatbush area. & is located in Flatbush, Brooklyn.
- 1928
  - Congregation Beth Israel, a two-story, rectangular buff brick building with Romanesque Revival and Classical Revival of Greco–Roman style elements.
  - Jewish Center of Kings Highway, a historic synagogue in Flatbush.
  - Bill Benulis was an American comic book artist in the 1950s, born in Brooklyn.
  - Kol Israel Synagogue, a historic synagogue in the Crown Heights community of Brooklyn.
  - Parkway Theatre opens, It was listed on the National Register of Historic Places in 2010.
- 1929 – Williamsburgh Savings Bank Tower was built. At the time of construction, it was the tallest office building in Brooklyn, at Flatbush and Atlantic Avenues.

=== 1930s ===
- 1933
  - Born in Brooklyn is television talk-show host and interviewer Larry King –
  - IND Culver Line (F, <F>, and G trains) opens to Church Avenue; extended to Coney Island–Stillwell Avenue along former BMT Culver Line in 1955
  - The Manhattanville Resolutions advocates for desegregation and the civil rights of African Americans.
- 1935
  - Sandy Koufax – baseball player is born in (Borough Park), Brooklyn. A left-handed pitcher, he played his entire Major League Baseball (MLB) career for the Brooklyn/Los Angeles Dodgers, from 1955 to 1966. Youngest player ever elected to the Baseball Hall of Fame.
  - Woody Allen – Woody Allen (born Allan Stewart Konigsberg; December 1, 1935) is an American screenwriter, director, actor, comedian, author, playwright, and musician whose career spans over 50 years is born in Brooklyn
  - United States Post Office (Kensington, Brooklyn), historic brick post office building in the Colonial Revival style. For much of its history it was painted white. NRHP.
  - Prospect Park Zoo opened.
- 1936
  - United States Post Office, a two-story, flat roofed red brick building with a one-story rear wing in the Colonial Revival style.
  - United States Post Office, opened as Station "A", historic post office building at Williamsburg in Brooklyn, in the Colonial Revival style. NRHP
  - United States Post Office (Flatbush, Brooklyn) a historic post office building, a symmetrical, two-story, red brick building with a gable roof and a large one-story rear wing.
  - Louis Gossett Jr.Born: May 27, 1936, Sheepshead Bay, Brooklyn and a lifetime fan of the Brooklyn Dodgers
  - The Brooklyn Institute of Arts and Sciences merges with the Brooklyn Academy of Music.

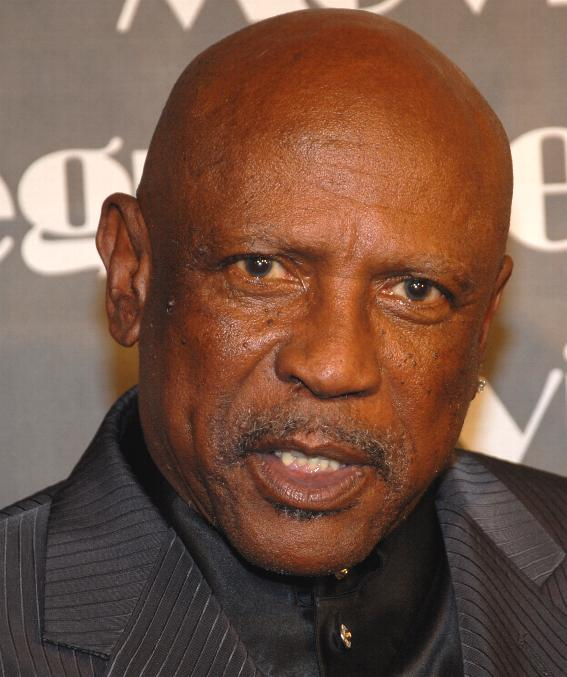
Louis Gossett Jr, Born: May 27, 1936

- 1938
  - John Corigliano, a famous composer who won an Academy Award, Pulitzer Prize for Music & Grammy Award was born in Midwood, Brooklyn
  - Elliott Gould an American actor born in Brooklyn.
- 1939
  - The original Kosciuszko Bridge opens.
  - Parachute Jump, an amusement ride built for the 1939 New York World's Fair. In 1941 it moved to Coney Island, Brooklyn, New York, and operated as part of Steeplechase Park until the 1960s. NRHP.

=== 1940s ===
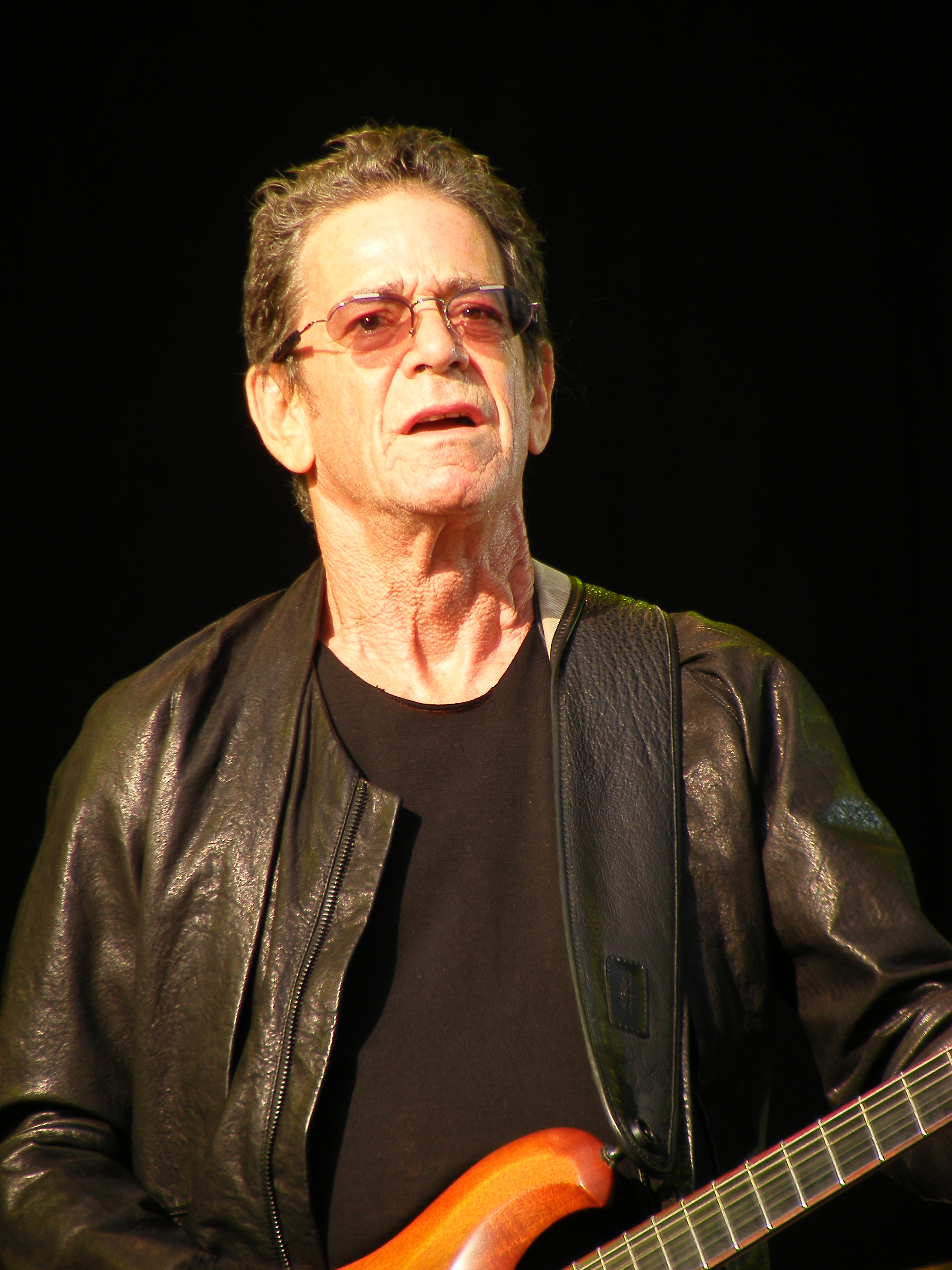
Lou Reed performing at the Hop Farm Music Festival (2011)

- Richie Havens born in Brooklyn, January 21, 1941, singer.
- 1941–1945, At its peak, during World War II, the Brooklyn Navy Yard employed 70,000 people, 24 hours a day.
  - December 7, 1941, the Attack on Pearl Harbor brings the United States into World War II the next day.
  - 1942
    - Born in Brooklyn is Tony Sirico, actor who played Peter Paul "Paulie Walnuts" Gualtieri a fictional character on the HBO TV series The Sopranos.
    - Lou Reed born in Brooklyn, rock musician & songwriter.
    - Joy Behar is an American comedian, writer, actress was born in Williamsburg, Brooklyn
  - 1944 – Elevated railways removed from the Brooklyn Bridge
- 1947
  - Arlo Guthrie, born in Coney Island, Brooklyn, singer.
  - Larry David (born in Sheepshead Bay, Brooklyn, July 2, 1947), comedian, writer, actor, and television producer.
- 1949
  - Lyle Alzado, born in Brooklyn, professional American football player. He played 15 seasons, splitting his time between the Denver Broncos, the Cleveland Browns, and finally the Los Angeles Raiders, with whom he won a championship in Super Bowl XVIII.
  - Jackie Robinson House was a Brooklyn home of baseball great Jackie Robinson from 1947 when he was earned Rookie of the Year with the Brooklyn Dodgers through 1949 when he was voted Most Valuable Player. It was declared a National Historic Landmark in 1976.

=== 1950s ===
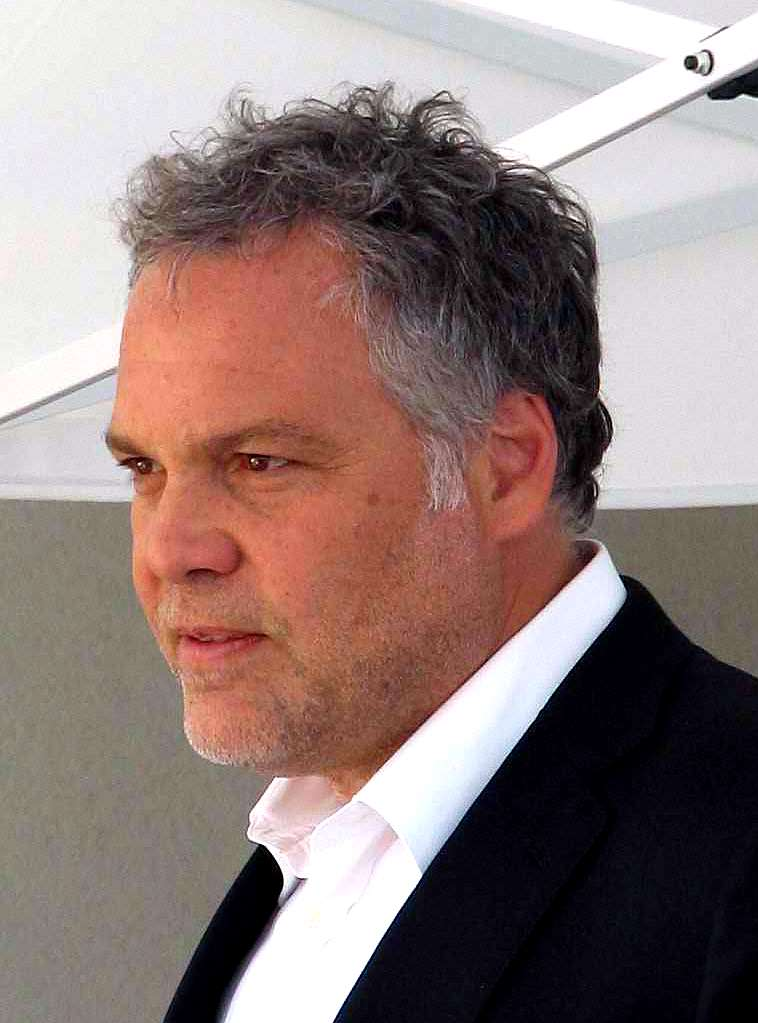
D'Onofrio in 2011.

- 1950 – Streetcar service discontinued on Brooklyn Bridge and other bridges.
- 1951 – Tony Danza born April 21, 1951, Comedic actor in television.
- 1953 – Academy Award winner Ken Burns born. (born July 29, 1953)
- 1954 – Jerry Seinfeld, (born April 29, 1954, in Brooklyn)), American comedian, actor, director, writer, and producer and famous for Seinfeld.
- 1955 – Brooklyn Eagle daily newspaper in the borough since 1841, ceases publication after 114 years following labor strike.
- 1956 – 1956 Bush Terminal explosion, Sunset Park
- 1957
  - Vilyam Genrikhovich Fisher, resident Soviet spy, is arrested.
  - Steve Buscemi, actor and director born.
  - New York Aquarium relocates from Castle Garden in Battery Park, Manhattan to Coney Island.
  - Brooklyn Dodgers baseball team and franchise in the National League of major league baseball departs for Los Angeles along with similar move by New York Giants to San Francisco.
  - Andrew Dice Clay (born "Andrew Clay Silverstein") controversial American comedian and motion picture actor
- 1959 - Vincent D'Onofrio born on June 30. Bensonhurst, Brooklyn. Actor, director, film producer, writer, and singer.

=== 1960s ===
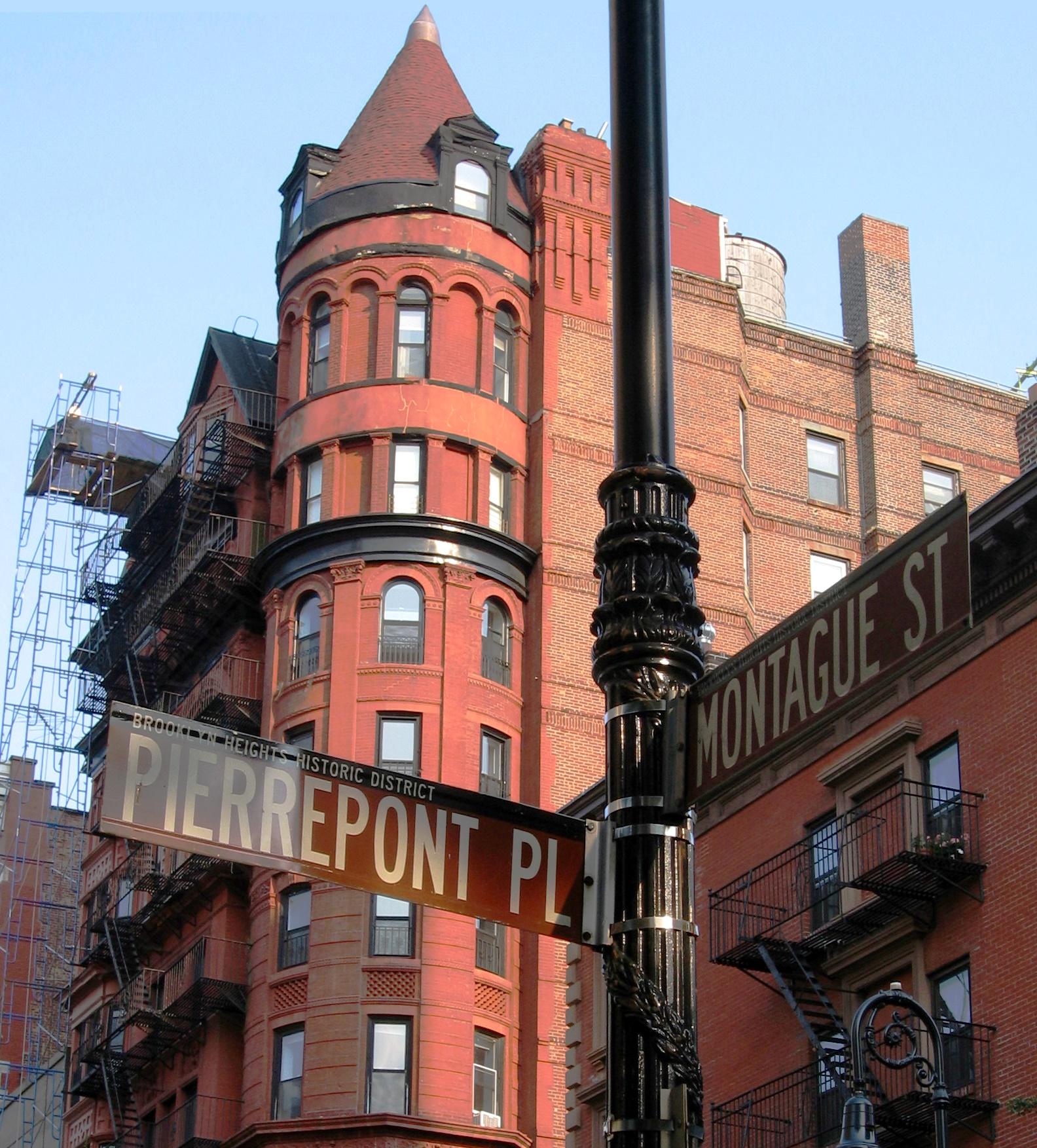
Brooklyn Heights Historic District

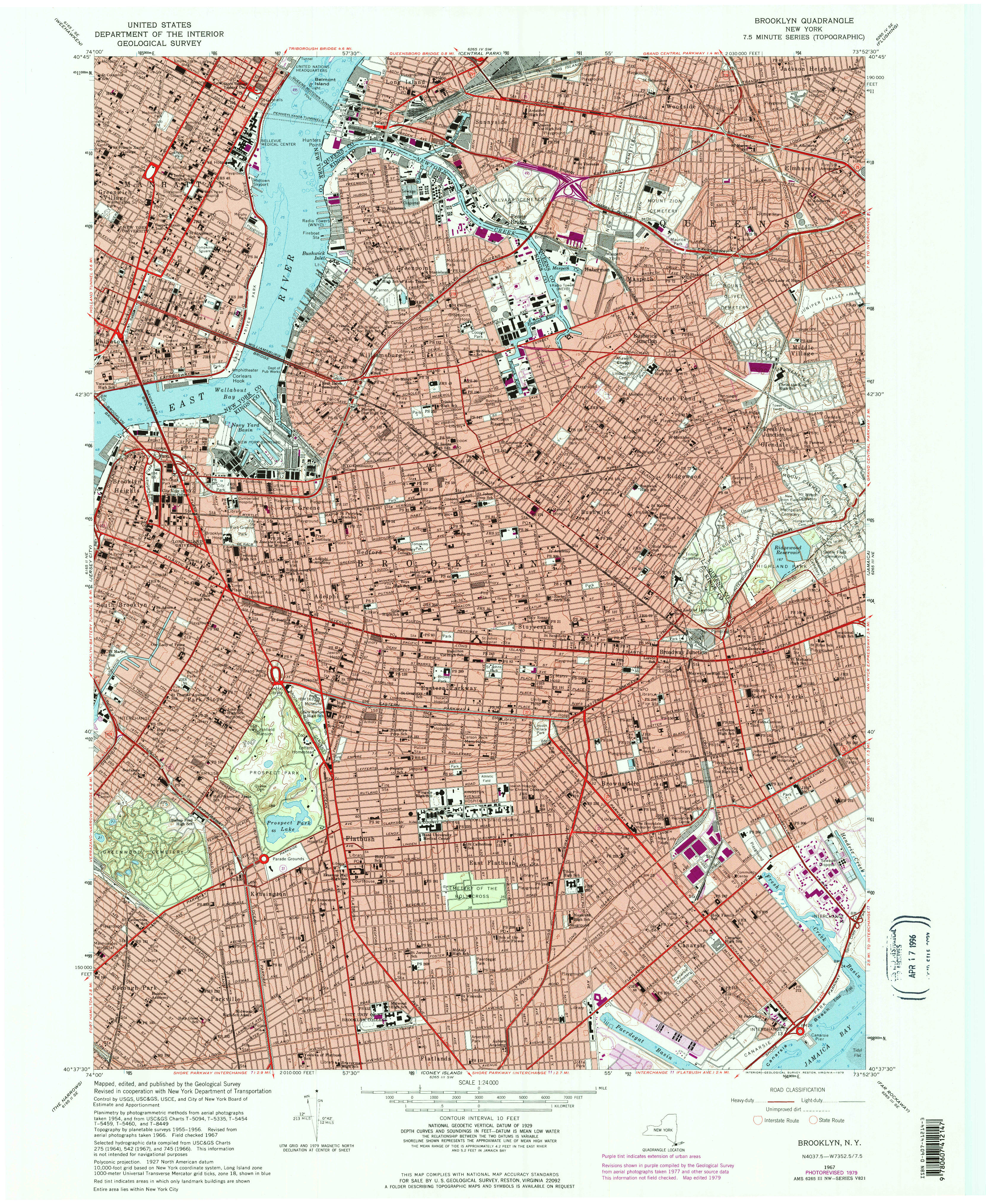
Map of (part of) Brooklyn in 1967

- 1961
  - Actor, comedian, and writer Charlie Murphy is born in Brooklyn. Charlie is also known for his work with his younger brother Eddie Murphy.
  - Brooklyn-Queens Expressway in operation.
  - Eddie Murphy is born in Brooklyn. A comedian, actor, writer, singer, director, and musician. He was a regular cast member on Saturday Night Live from 1980 to 1984 and has worked as a stand-up comedian.
- 1963
  - The revised (1963) New York City Charter creates community boards within each borough.
  - Mark Breland (born 1963) – actor and boxer; five-time New York Golden Gloves champion and won a gold medal at the 1984 Olympics.
- 1964 - Verrazzano–Narrows Bridge opens November 21, providing a gateway to suburban-style living for thousands of Italian-American Brooklynites.
- 1965
  - Brooklyn Heights Historic District was named a National Historic Landmark in January 1965, designated a New York City Landmark in November 1965, and added to the National Register of Historic Places in October 1966.
  - Saint Ann's School, considered one of New York's most prestigious private schools, and well known for its lack of formal grading, is founded in Brooklyn Heights
- 1966
  - Closing of the Brooklyn Navy Yard.
  - The New Utrecht Reformed Church received landmark status.
  - Flatbush Town Hall was designated a New York City Landmark.
- 1967 – Wyckoff House was declared a National Historic Landmark. The house is estimated to have been built in 1652, it is the oldest surviving example of a Dutch saltbox frame house in America, and was one of the first structures built by Europeans on Long Island.
- 1969
  - Shirley Chisholm becomes U.S. representative for New York's 12th congressional district.
  - Darren Aronofsky an American film director, screenwriter and film producer was born in Brooklyn, the son of public school teachers. He grew up in the borough's Manhattan Beach neighborhood and graduated from Edward R. Murrow High School.

=== 1970s ===
- 1970 – John Rankin House (Brooklyn, New York) – one of the finest Greek Revival houses in the city was designated a New York City landmark.
- 1971 – The French Connection is filmed in Brooklyn and is an American dramatic thriller film about crime, detectives, and the increasing worldwide nature of drug smuggling.
- 1972
  - The Alliance of Resident Theatres/New York (A.R.T./New York), founded in 1972, A.R.T./New York serves nearly 400 not-for-profit theatres throughout New York City. Its South Oxford Space in the Cultural District houses twenty-one performing arts organizations.
  - Flatbush Town Hall was listed on the National Register of Historic Places.
  - "Bang on a Can" founded as a twelve-hour music festival, later much expanded.
- 1973 – State Street Houses were designated New York City landmarks, built between 1847 and 1874 in the Boerum Hill neighborhood.
- 1974
  - "Quarters A" (commander's house) at the old Brooklyn Navy Yard was declared a National Historic Landmark.
  - Fulton Ferry District consists of 15 contributing buildings built between 1830 and 1895 and was listed on the National Register of Historic Places. The district was the site of the terminus of the Fulton Ferry. Today the area holds many popular attractions such as Pier One of Brooklyn Bridge Park, and Grimaldi's pizza.
  - Jimmy Fallon was born on September 19, 1974, in Bay Ridge. Television host, performer and producer, hosting a later night-time variety show. Fallon was best known as a cast member on Saturday Night Live – Host of Weekend Update from 1998 to 2004 and was host of Late Night with Jimmy Fallon from 2009 to 2014.
- 1975 - The movie Dog Day Afternoon, set and filmed in Brooklyn starring Al Pacino, is released.
- 1976
  - Cobble Hill Historic District and consists of 796 contributing, largely residential buildings built between the 1830s and 1920s. It includes fine examples of Greek Revival, Italianate, and Queen Anne style row houses and is listed on the National Register of Historic Places.
  - Wyckoff-Bennett Homestead was declared a National Historic Landmark. Historians estimate that the Wyckoff-Bennett Homestead was constructed before 1766. During the American Revolution, it housed Hessian soldiers, two of whom, Captain Toepfer of the Ditfourth regiment and Lieut. M. Bach of the Hessen-Hanau Artillerie, scratched their names and units into windowpanes.
  - New York Transit Museum opens on July 4 in the old Court Street terminus for the IND Fulton Street Line.
- 1977
  - Saturday Night Fever, a musical film, starring John Travolta, in his break-out major role, is filmed in Brooklyn. Famous also for using the disco music soundtrack by The Beegees.
  - 23rd Regiment Armory was designated a New York City landmark.
  - Horror film The Sentinet, filmed in Brooklyn Heights, is released January 7.
- 1978 – John Rankin House (Brooklyn, New York) – one of the finest Greek Revival houses in the city was added to the National Register of Historic Places in 1978.

=== 1980s ===
- 1980
  - Park Slope Historic District was listed on the National Register of Historic Places. and consists of 1,802 contributing buildings built between 1862 and about 1920. The 33 block district is almost exclusively residential and located adjacent to Prospect Park.
  - 23rd Regiment Armory was listed on the National Register of Historic Places for its historic and distinct architecture.
  - United American Muslim Association headquartered in Brooklyn.
  - State Street Houses, 23 Greek Revival and Italianate rowhouses built between 1847 and 1874 and located at 291–299 (odd) and 290–324 (even) State Street between Smith and Hoyt Streets in the Boerum Hill neighborhood of Brooklyn, New York City. were listed on the National Register of Historic Places.
- 1982
  - Motion picture Sophie's Choice is filmed in Brooklyn
  - Astral Apartments, historic apartment building in Brooklyn & built in 1885–1886 as affordable housing for employees of Charles Pratt's Astral Oil Works was listed on the National Register of Historic Places in 1982
- 1983
  - Astral Apartments (1885–1886) are designated a City Landmark.
  - Brooklyn Army Terminal (built in 1918 for World War I) was listed on the National Register of Historic Places in 1983. The listing includes 11 contributing buildings on an area of 97.2 acres (39.3 ha).
  - Carroll Gardens Historic District was listed on the National Register of Historic Placesc and consists of 134 contributing residential rowhouses built between the 1860s and 1880s. They are two and three-story brownstone buildings in neo-Grec and late Italianate styles featuring uniform setbacks, even cornice lines and stoop levels, and fenced front yards and landscaped gardens.
  - Cypress Avenue West Historic District was listed on the National Register of Historic Places and includes 440 contributing buildings built between 1888 and 1906. They consist mainly of brick two and three-story row houses with one apartment per floor and three-story tenements with two apartments per floor.
  - Boerum Hill Historic District is listed on the National Register of Historic Places and consists of 238 contributing residential rowhouses and a few commercial buildings built between 1845 and 1890. Most are three bay, three-story brick buildings with projecting stoops in a Greek Revival or Italianate style.
  - Ditmas Park Historic District is listed on the National Register of Historic Places and consists of 172 contributing, largely residential buildings built between 1902 and 1914. It includes fine examples of Colonial Revival, Bungalow/Craftsman, and Queen Anne style single family homes. Also in the district is one church, the brick Neo-Georgian style architecture of Flatbush Congregational Church (1910).
  - Fort Greene Historic District is listed on the National Register of Historic Places, built between 1840 and 1890. Most are faced in sandstone and exhibit characteristics of the Greek Revival, Italianate, Second Empire, and Neo-Greco styles. It includes a 33-acre park designed by landscape architect Frederick Law Olmsted and Calvert Vaux in 1868.
  - Greenpoint Historic District is listed on the National Register of Historic Places, consisting of 363 contributing commercial and residential buildings built between 1850 and 1900, including both substantial and modest row houses, numerous walk-up apartment buildings, as well as a variety of commercial buildings including the former Eberhard Faber Pencil Factory, six churches, and two banks.
  - Rockwood Chocolate Factory Historic District was listed on the National Register of Historic Places in 1983. and consists of 16 contributing buildings built between 1891 and 1928. The largest and oldest building (Building 1 and 2) dates to 1891 and is located at the corner of Washington and Park avenues. It is a five-story, Romanesque Revival style building. Much of the complex has been converted to loft apartments.
- 1984
  - Once Upon a Time in America is a 1984 Italian epic crime drama film co-written and directed by Sergio Leone and starring Robert De Niro and James Woods. It chronicles the lives of Jewish ghetto youths who rise to prominence in New York City's world of organized crime. Once Upon a Time in America was filmed in Brooklyn.
  - Weir Greenhouse, is a historic greenhouse located in Sunset Park, Brooklyn was listed on the National Register of Historic Places. It was built in 1880 and significantly rebuilt and enlarged in 1895.
- 1985
  - Clinton Hill Historic District was listed on the National Register of Historic Places and is made up of 1,063 contributing, largely residential buildings.
  - Long Island Historical Society, founded by Henry Pierrepont, (1808–1888) and others in 1863, under a charter from the New England Historic Genealogical Society in Boston, changes its name from LIHS to the Brooklyn Historical Society. Located at 128 Pierrepoint Street near Clinton Street in Brooklyn Heights, in a historic mansion designed by architect George B. Post in 1878–1881.
- 1986
  - "No Sleep till Brooklyn" is a song by Beastie Boys as well as the sixth single on their debut studio album Licensed to Ill is recorded and released the following year.
  - Clinton Hill South Historic District was listed on the National Register of Historic Places and consists of 246 contributing, largely residential buildings built between the 1850s and 1922. It includes fine examples of Neo-Grec style row houses.
  - Neil Simon film Brighton Beach Memoirs is filmed in Brooklyn
- 1987 – The movie Radio Days is filmed in Brooklyn and is directed by Woody Allen and is a movie that takes a look back on an American family's life during the Golden Age of Radio using both music and memories to tell the story.
- 1988 – 651 ARTS was founded and is committed to developing, producing, and presenting performing arts and cultural programming grounded in the African Diaspora, with a primary focus on contemporary performing arts. 651 ARTS serves the cultural life of New York City, with a particular focus on Brooklyn, one of America's most culturally diverse communities.
- 1989 - The movie Do the Right Thing, focused on racial tensions set in Bedford-Stuyvesant, was released. The movie has been named one of the best films of all time and is enshrined in the Library of Congress.

=== 1990s ===
- 1990 – Goodfellas is filmed in Brooklyn – a 1990 American crime film directed by Martin Scorsese and was nominated for six Academy Awards.
- 1992 – Lefferts Manor Historic District was listed on the National Register of Historic Places.
- 1993 – The Boathouse on the Lullwater of the Lake in Prospect Park was seen in Scorsese's movie: The Age of Innocence (1993).
- 1995 – Baptist Temple (Brooklyn, New York) was listed on the National Register of Historic Places. Constructed in 1893–1894 in the Romanesque Revival style and rebuilt after a fire in 1917–1918.
- 1998
  - The parish house and the cemetery received landmark status at the New Utrecht Reformed Church.
  - The Carey Playhouse is converted to the four-screen Brooklyn Academy of Music Rose Cinemas, home to BAMcinématek, featuring repertory, independent, and foreign films.
  - Brooklyn Academy of Music – BAMcafé Live begins programming free weekend music in the Lepercq Space
  - Old First Reformed Church (Brooklyn, New York) was listed on the National Register of Historic Places.

== 21st century ==
=== 2000s ===
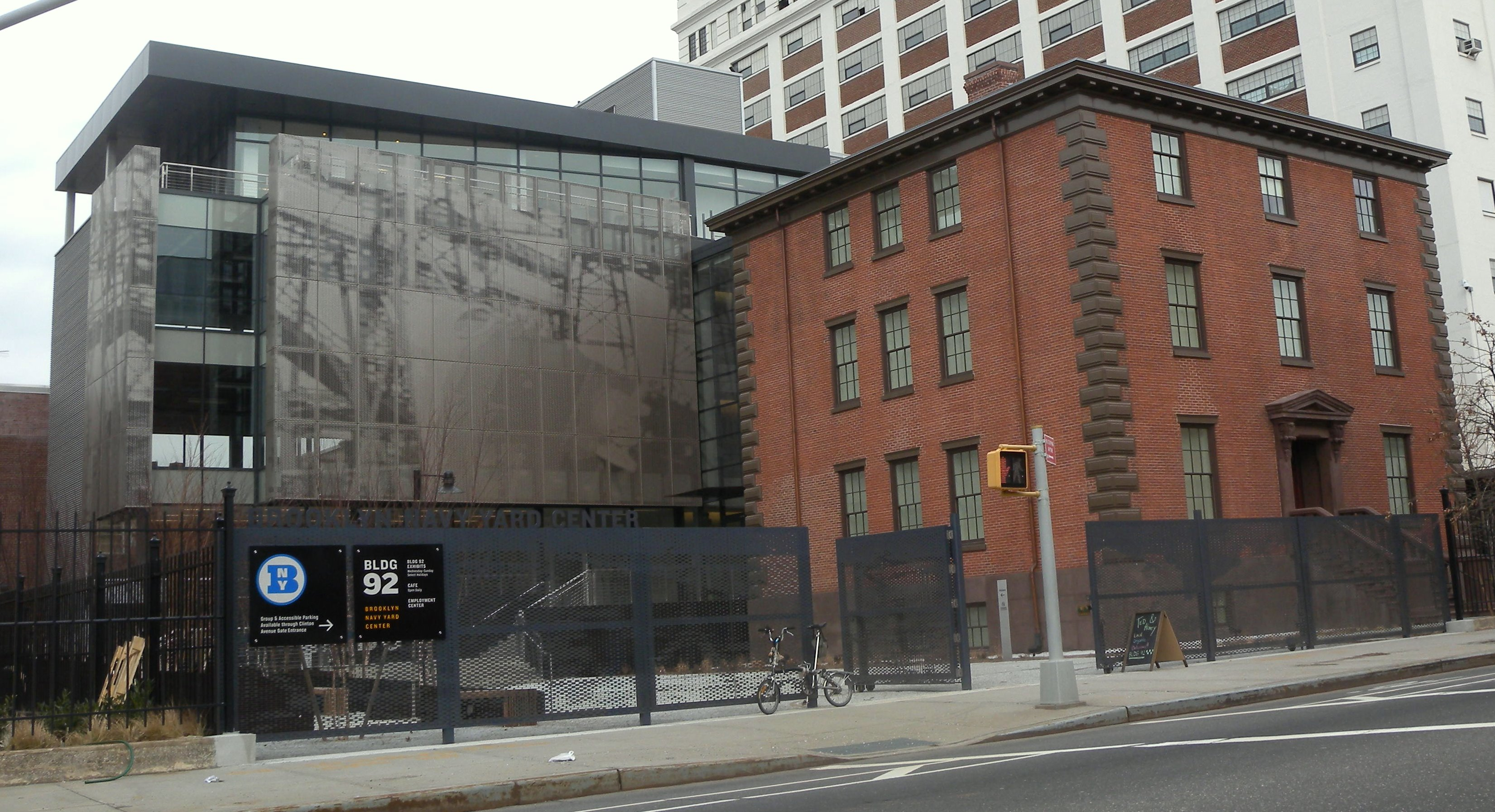
Brooklyn Navy Yard, Building 92 museum

- 2000 – DUMBO Industrial District was listed on the National Register of Historic Places. The district includes the earliest large-scale reinforced concrete factory buildings in America.
- 2001 – Brooklyn Cyclones – The team's new park, which was then called KeySpan Park, was completed in time for the 2001 season. Brooklyn had been without professional baseball since 1958.
- 2002
  - A Memorandum of Understanding was signed by Governor George Pataki and Mayor Michael Bloomberg in 2002 that created Brooklyn Bridge Park.
  - The movie Deuces Wild is filmed in Brooklyn & is set in 1958 and Martin Scorsese was the executive producer.
  - Senator Street Historic District buildings built between 1906 and 1912. They are all three-story brownstone rowhouses in the Neo-Renaissance style. Listed on the National Register of Historic Places.
- 2003
  - Gun court of law established.
  - Williamsburg Houses were designated a New York City Landmark.
- 2004
  - Renovation of the 80 Arts – James E. Davis Arts Building, completed in Summer 2004, becoming the Downtown Brooklyn Cultural District's first completed project.
  - Steiner Studios Opens at the site of the Brooklyn Navy Yard. The 310,000-square-foot facility is the largest and most sophisticated studio complex outside of Hollywood, offering five soundstages and state-of-the-art film and television production facilities. Steiner Studios
- 2006
  - Brooklyn Book Festival and the show with zefrank begin. "A Literary Voice With a Pronounced Brooklyn Accent"
  - East Midwood Jewish Center was listed on the National Register of Historic Places.
- 2007
  - East River State Park opens on May 26
  - Construction starts at Northside Piers, a 29-story – 180-unit building of luxury condominium tower in Williamsburg, Brooklyn.
  - Opening of a 400-foot-long recreation pier with the city's finest waterfront sculpture, a dramatic, stainless-steel, curving canopy designed by Brooklyn artist, Mark Gibian and located in Williamsburg, Brooklyn.
  - Steiner Studios was the location of the 17th annual Gotham Awards held on November 27, 2007.
  - We Own the Night is filmed in Brooklyn, American crime drama film written and directed by James Gray.
  - Brooklyn Ink in publication.
- 2008
  - One Brooklyn Bridge Park, a building that converted 1,000,000+ square foot warehouse building located along Furman Street just south of Joralemon Street with over 400 residential units with 80,000 square feet of ground floor retail, and over 500 parking spaces.
  - April 2008, Brooklyn Flea opens.
- 2009
  - Shaari Zedek Synagogue & Congregation Beth Israel (Brooklyn, New York) were listed on the National Register of Historic Places.
  - Brooklyn Academy of Music launches The Bridge Project, a transatlantic partnership with London's Old Vic and Neal Street Productions; productions of Chekhov's The Cherry Orchard and Shakespeare's The Winter's Tale, directed by Sam Mendes, open at BAM before touring the globe.
  - The City Council adopted a plan calling for expansion of the historic amusement area at Coney Island and the creation of new housing and investment in municipal infrastructure.

=== 2010s ===
- 2010
  - Population: 2,504,700.
  - Steiner Studios, the largest US film and television production studio complex outside of Hollywood, started an expansion project within the Brooklyn Navy Yard.
  - Young Israel of Flatbush was listed on the National Register of Historic Places.
  - May 29, A second Luna Park opened on the former site of the Astroland amusement park. in Coney Island. Luna Park includes 19 attractions designed and manufactured by Antonio Zamperla, SpA (Zamperla). Luna Park also operates the historic Cyclone Roller Coaster.
- 2011
  - In October, it was announced that Douglaston Development, which built the Edge, the adjoining property just to the north of Northside Piers, would build a 40-story rental tower on a site within the Northside Pier complex with construction scheduled to bring in March 2012.
  - The Brooklyn Flea opened the Williamsburg location.
  - Brooklyn Academy of Music celebrates ¡Sí Cuba!, a citywide festival of Cuban culture, with the BAM presentations of Creole Choir and Ballet Nacional de Cuba.
- 2012
  - The Brooklyn Flea opened the DUMBO location at the historic Tobacco Warehouse.
  - In March 2012, Mayor Michael Bloomberg unveiled five new sound stages (a total of 30,500 square feet (2,830 m^{2})) at Steiner Studios. The new sound stages all feature two or three wall cycloramas.
  - On February 2, 2012, the Weir Greenhouse was purchased by the neighboring Green-Wood Cemetery, which plans to preserve the greenhouse and restore elements which have decayed in recent years.
  - In December 2012, the city approved 50,000 square feet of new creative, cultural, and community space at the "South Site" located at Flatbush Avenue and Lafayette Street.
  - In October, the $637 million Barclays Center, where the Brooklyn Nets play, opened.
- 2013
  - Saxophone player Fred Ho performed his final performance at the Brooklyn Academy of Music (BAM) on October 11–12, 2013. In 2009, he received the Harvard Arts Medal.
  - Coney Island's historic B&B Carousell is open to the public after a five-year restoration.
- 2014
  - In May, the Brooklyn Navy Yard is listed on the National Register of Historic Places.
  - In June, the new Thunderbolt roller coaster at Coney Island opens.
- 2015
  - In January the movie Brooklyn, filmed in part in Coney Island.
  - Hillary Clinton presidential campaign, 2016 headquartered in Brooklyn.
  - The landmarks commission designated a 16-block area bounded by Gates Avenue, Fulton Street, Bedford Avenue and Tompkins Avenue as the Bedford Historic District. The 800 largely intact residential buildings represent various styles.
- 2017
  - The first of two replacement spans for the Kosciuszko Bridge open.

=== 2020s ===
- 2022 - January 1: Antonio Reynoso becomes the 20th Brooklyn Borough President.

== See also ==
- History of Brooklyn
- List of Brooklyn borough presidents
- List of New York City Designated Landmarks in Brooklyn
- National Register of Historic Places listings in Kings County, New York
- Mayors of the City of Brooklyn from 1834 to 1898
- List of New York City Subway stations in Brooklyn
- List of Brooklyn neighborhoods
- List of streetcar lines in Brooklyn
- History of New York City
- Timeline of New York City

other NYC boroughs

- Timeline of the Bronx
- Timeline of Queens
- Timeline of Staten Island
