= Historic Palmyra, Palmyra Historical Society =

Historic Palmyra (New York)

The Official organizational founding of Historic Palmyra was in 1912 with first meetings of the Palmyra Historic Society. Historic Palmyra has records covering all areas of the society and all years the society had activities. As the Society expanded all new activities and records from 1934–69 and another collection covering 1964-2005.

== Collections ==
Collections relating to history of Wayne County, New York area and the Palmyra, New York. Most of these items are not on the internet and to get access to them go to the Historic Palmyra site, call or email. A small charge is made for any assistance.

  - Highway use records from 1800s
  - Family bibles from 1790s
  - Day books from 1800–1900
  - Erie Canal information
  - Original art work (Examples)
    - E. J. Read
    - Major John Gilbert type setter for the Book of Mormon
    - E. B. Grandin
  - Private District school records Palmyra, NY 1816-1833
  - Military artifacts – 1812 – current
  - Photographs of early schools, homes, businesses, street views
  - Religious artifacts and history
  - Wayne County Fair history
  - Original manuscripts on history of Palmyra, 1836 by James Reeves
  - Indentures 1789 - 1900
  - Underground Railroad Records Records that show what happened to some of those who traveled the Underground Railroad to the Palmyra Area. this information covering 1816-1880s.
  - Deeds 1790 - 1900
  - Photographs and other art work 1794–1970s
  - Newspapers 1826 - current
  - Business records 1801 – mid-1900s
  - Urban Renewal History – Palmyra, NY 1964–1976

== Museums ==
- Alling Coverlet Museum – 122 William Street – Palmyra, NY 14522 This Museum was founded and opened in 1976 on July 4.
- The Old Newspaper Printing office and type office shows 40 years of newspaper printing equipment, office equipment and type, and much more.
- William Phelps Museum construction in 1826. Proprietor William Phelps completed renovations to the store by 1875. This site includes much about the life style of the 1800s, including the home and general store of the William Phelps.
- Palmyra Historical Museum The main museum is loaded with both historical and genealogical items many of these are listed above.

== History ==
=== Fight for Palmyra ===
Urban Renewal History – Palmyra, NY 1964–1976 The Federal Government had Palmyra scheduled for Urban Renewal. This would have taken much of the older down town now the historical part of Palmyra. Historic Palmyra saved the north side of the Village of Palmyra included the Grandin Building, all buildings between William and Market Street as well as business district on William Street and Market Street.

== Address ==
Historic Palmyra 132 Market Street Palmyra, New York 14522

== Other New York Historical Societies and Museums ==
- New-York Historical Society
- List of museums and cultural institutions in New York City
- List of New York City Designated Landmarks in Manhattan from 59th to 110th Streets
- History of New York
- History of New York City
- Timeline of New York City
- Brooklyn Historical Society
- History of Brooklyn
- Timeline of Brooklyn
- History of Queens
- History of the Bronx
- History of Staten Island
- Hudson River School
- American History Book Prize
- "The Course of Empire"
- New York and New Jersey campaign
