= Fort Brooklyn =

Coordinates: 40°41.73′0″N 73°59.64′0″W

- Brooklyn Heights, near present day Pierrepont and Henry Streets

Site information
- Type: Star Fort
- Condition: Replaced by urban development

Site history
- Built: May, 1780
- Built by: British Army
- In use: 1780–1781
- Demolished: ca. 1825
- Battles/wars: American Revolutionary War; Battle of Brooklyn

Garrison information
- Occupants: British Army; US Continental Army

Fort Brooklyn was a British-built large star fort built to support the occupation of Brooklyn during the American Revolutionary War.

The site was on Brooklyn Heights, near present-day Pierrepont and Henry Streets, about four blocks from Fort Stirling. The fort was 450 feet square with ramparts 40 to 50 feet above the bottom of an encircling ditch.

Each angle had a bastion and there was a substantial barracks and two magazines. After the British evacuation the fort was leveled between 1823 and 1825 for development.

== Sources ==
- New York State Division of Military and Naval Affairs: Military History
