= Boerum Hill Historic District =

Historic district in Brooklyn, New York

- U.S. National Register of Historic Places
- U.S. Historic district
- New York State Register of Historic Places
- New York City Landmark
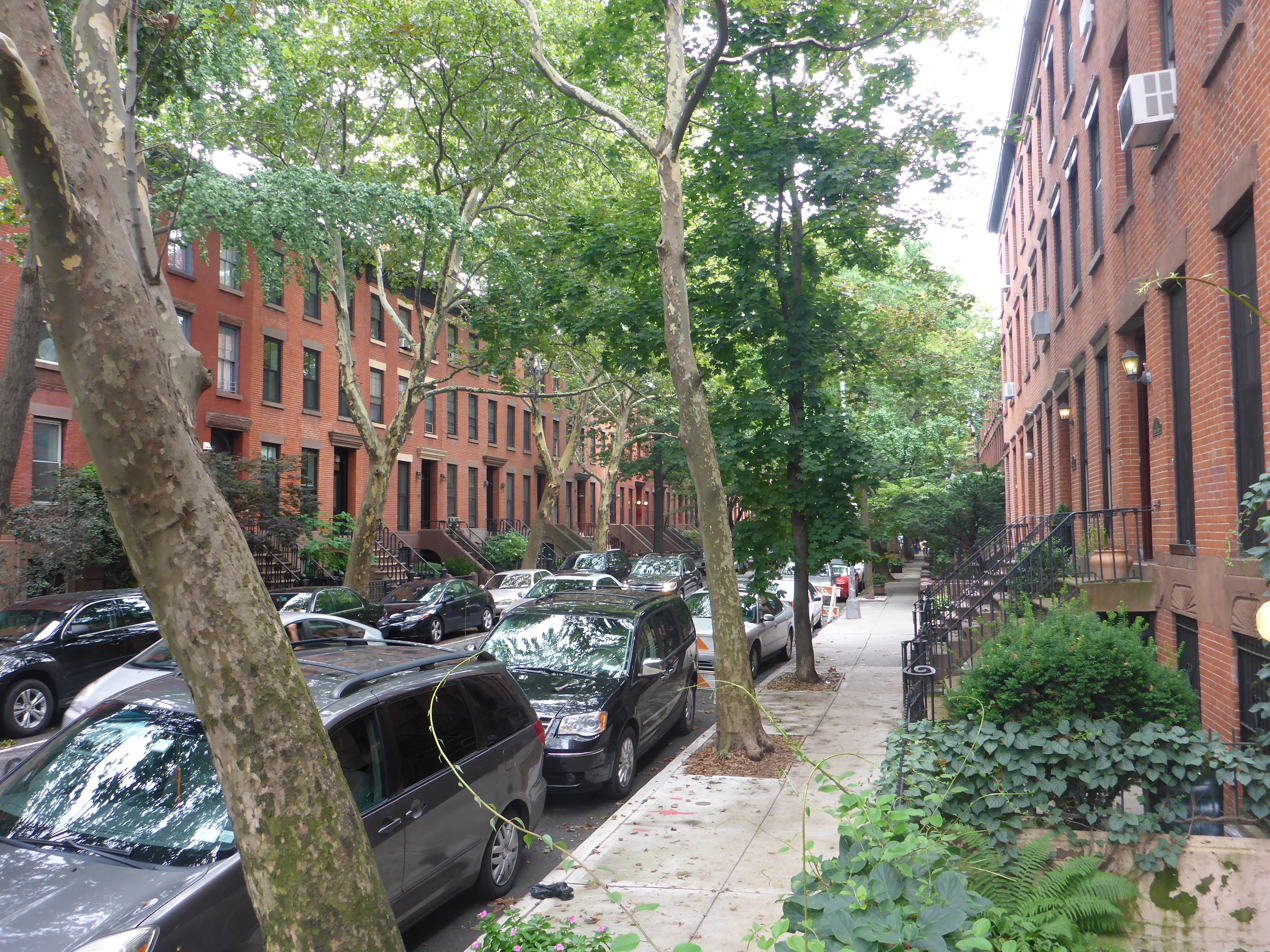
- Bergen Street near Hoyt in Boerum Hill Historic District, August 2013

- Location within New York City Location within New York Location within the United States
- Location: Roughly bounded by Pacific, Wyckoff, Bergen, Nevins, Bond and Hoyt Sts., New York, New York
- Coordinates: 40°41′7″N 73°59′13″W
- Area: 20 acres (8.1 ha)
- Built: 1845
- Architectural style: Greek Revival, Italianate
- NRHP reference No.: 83001686
- NYCL No.: 0767, 2599

Significant dates
- Added to NRHP: September 26, 1983
- Designated NYSRHP: August 3, 1983
- Designated NYCL: November 20, 1973 (original); June 26, 2018 (extension)

Boerum Hill Historic District is a national historic district in Boerum Hill, Brooklyn, New York City. It originally consisted of 238 contributing residential rowhouses and a few commercial buildings built between 1845 and 1890. Most are three bay, three story brick buildings with projecting stoops in a Greek Revival or Italianate style.

It was listed on the National Register of Historic Places in 1983. Its area was approximately doubled in 2018.
