= John Rankin House (Brooklyn) =

Historic house in Brooklyn, New York

- U.S. National Register of Historic Places
- New York State Register of Historic Places
- New York City Landmark
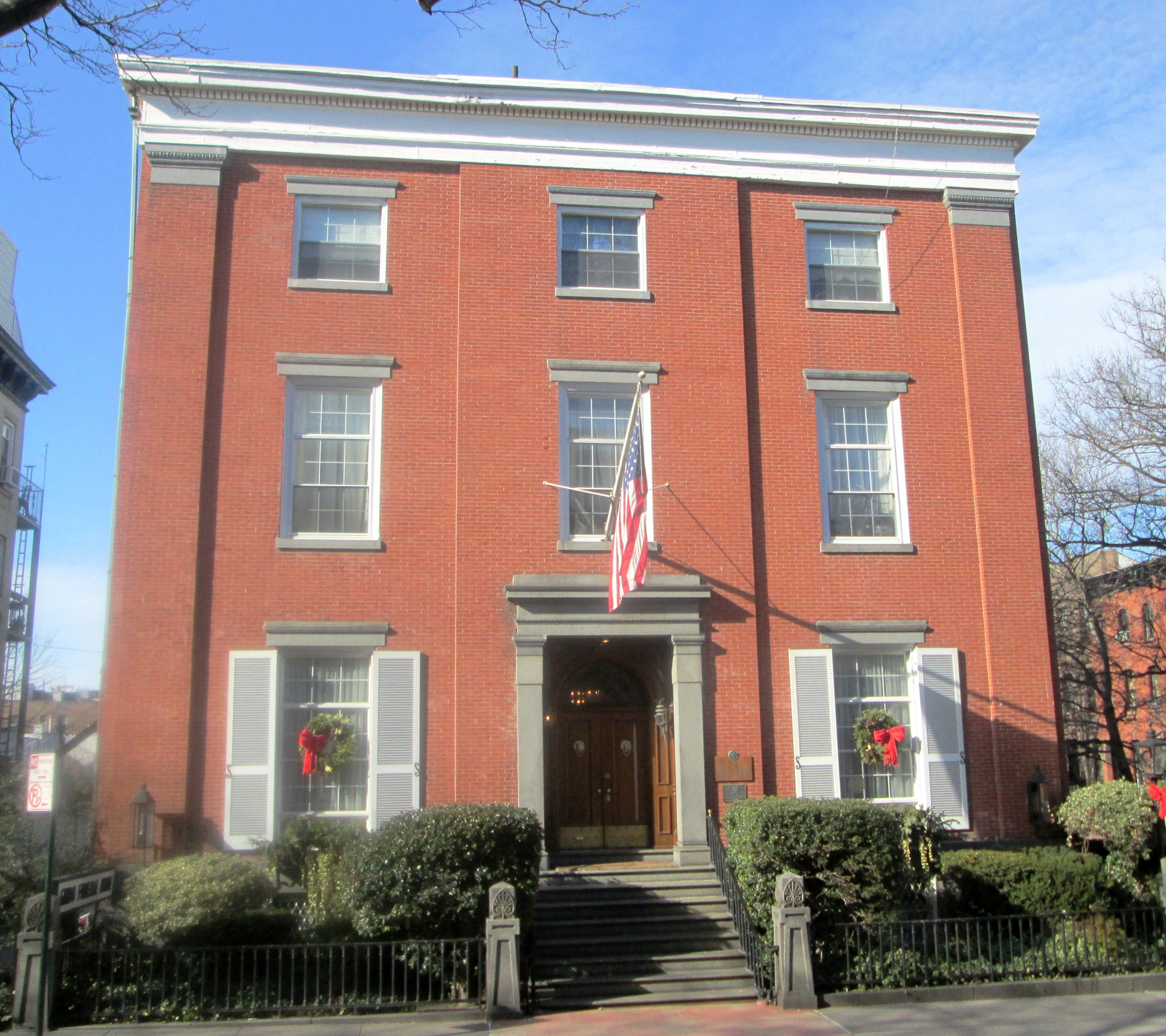
- (2013)

- Location within New York City Location within New York Location within the United States
- Location: 440 Clinton Street; Brooklyn, New York City
- Coordinates: 40°40′53.4″N 73°59′56″W
- Built: 1840
- Architectural style: Greek Revival
- NRHP reference No.: 78001856
- NYSRHP No.: 04701.000155
- NYCL No.: 0628

Significant dates
- Added to NRHP: November 16, 1978
- Designated NYSRHP: June 23, 1980
- Designated NYCL: July 14, 1970

The John Rankin House at 440 Clinton Street at the corner of Carroll Street in the Carroll Gardens neighborhood of Brooklyn, New York City was built in the Greek Revival style in 1840, at which time it stood by itself, surrounded by farmland and overlooking Upper New York Bay.

Rankin was a merchant, and the mansion, one of the finest Greek Revival houses in the city, was one of the largest residences in Brooklyn in the 1840s. It is a three-story, square brick building on a stone foundation. The interior features a massive mahogany stairway with paneled wainscotting.

It was designated a New York City landmark in 1970, and was added to the National Register of Historic Places in 1978. Currently it is the F. G. Guido Funeral Home.
