= Senator Street Historic District =

Historic district in Brooklyn, New York

- U.S. National Register of Historic Places
- U.S. Historic district
- New York State Register of Historic Places
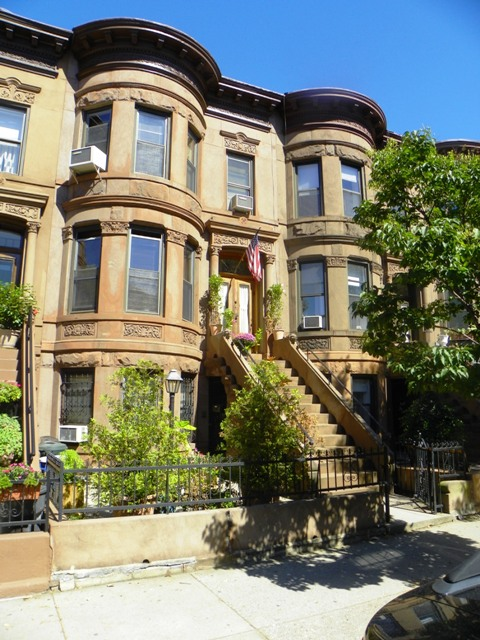

- Location within New York City Location within New York Location within the United States
- Location: 318-370 and 317-347 Senator St., Brooklyn, New York
- Coordinates: 40°38′12″N 74°1′27″W
- Area: 2.5 acres (1.0 ha)
- Built: 1906
- Architects: Eisenla, Fred W.
- Architectural style: Renaissance
- NRHP reference No.: 02001115

Significant dates
- Added to NRHP: October 10, 2002
- Designated NYSRHP: August 2, 2002

Senator Street Historic District is a national historic district in Bay Ridge, Brooklyn, New York City. It consists of 40 contributing residential buildings (including two garages) built between 1906 and 1912. They are all three story brownstone rowhouses in the Neo-Renaissance style. The houses feature high stoops and full sized subterranean basements. Located between 67th and 68th Streets, the street is named for New York State Senator Henry Cruse Murphy, who also held other elected positions.

It was listed on the National Register of Historic Places in 2002.
