= Congregation Beth Israel (Brooklyn) =

Church in Brooklyn, New York

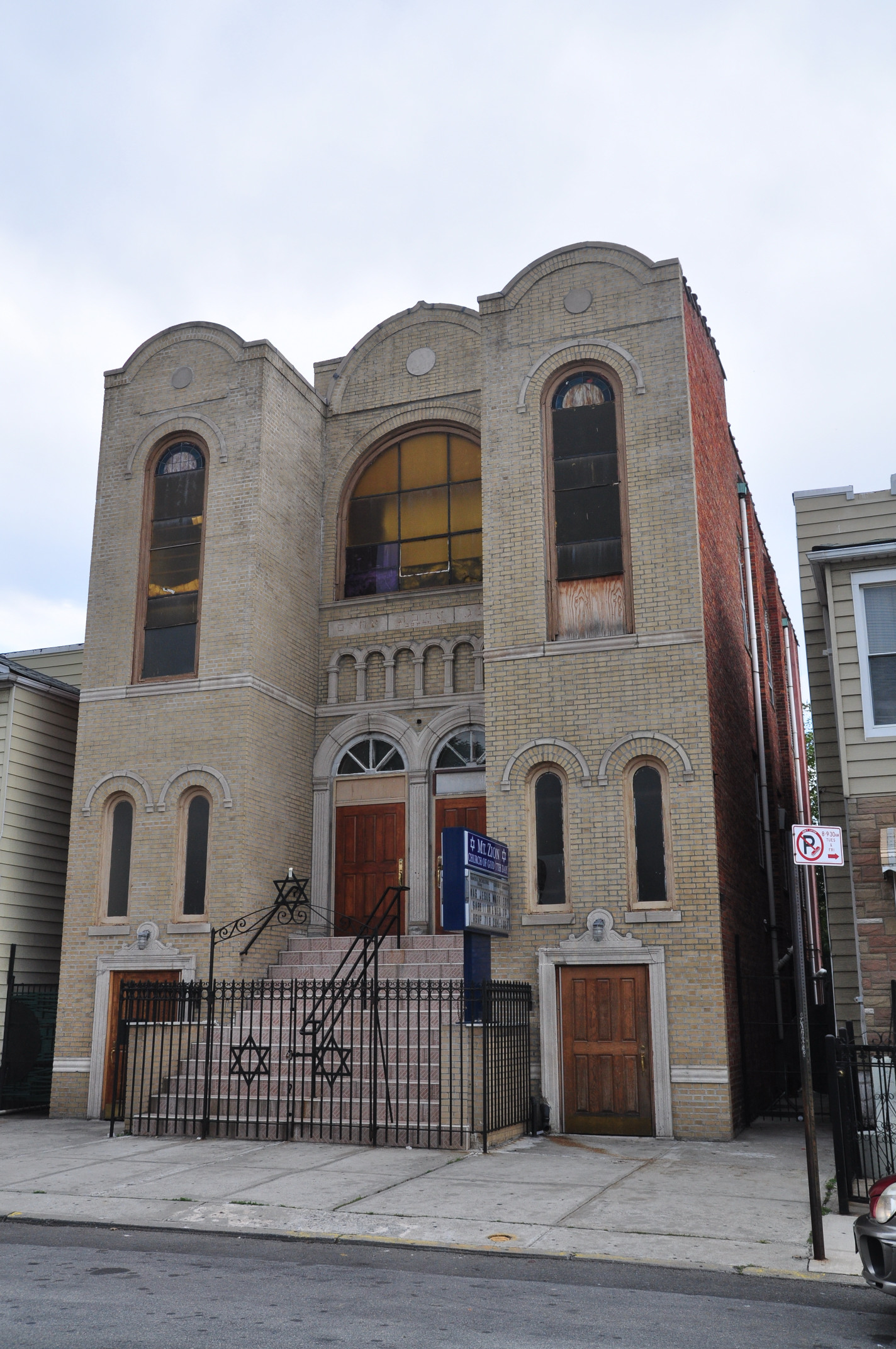
- The former synagogue in 2012

- Location of the former synagogue in New York City

Religion
- Affiliation: Judaism (former); Christianity (current)
- Ecclesiastical or organisational status: Synagogue (1928–c. 1970); Church (since c. 1970)
- Status: Closed (as a synagogue); Repurposed (as a church)

Location
- Location: 203 East 37th Street, East Flatbush, Brooklyn, New York City, New York
- Country: United States
- Coordinates: 40°39′8″N 73°56′35″W

Architecture
- Architect: Peter Millman
- Type: Synagogue architecture
- Style: Romanesque Revival; Neoclassical
- Completed: 1928
- Congregation Beth Israel
- U.S. National Register of Historic Places
- New York State Register of Historic Places
- Area: less than one acre
- NRHP reference No.: 09000256
- NYSRHP No.: 04701.016327

Significant dates
- Added to NRHP: April 30, 2009
- Designated NYSRHP: December 17, 2008

Congregation Beth Israel is a former Jewish congregation and synagogue, located at 203 East 37th Street, in East Flatbush neighborhood of Brooklyn, New York City, New York, United States.

== History ==
The synagogue building was erected in 1928.

The congregation membership declined with the migration of the local Jewish populace to wealthier areas of Brooklyn and to the suburbs. The synagogue building became defunct c. 1970, and the congregation sold its building to Mt. Zion Church of God 7th Day at that time.

The former synagogue building was listed on the National Register of Historic Places in 2009. It is a two-story rectangular structure of buff brick, with Romanesque Revival and Neoclassical style elements. It has a tripartite front façade with round arch windows. It features the Star of David on the front fence, the stained glass windows, pews, and plaster work.
