= Ajka alumina plant accident =

Ajka alumina 2010 industrial accident in Hungary

- Spill site and affected localities
- Interactive map of Ajka alumina plant accident
- Location: Ajka, Hungary
- Coordinates: 47°5′19″N 17°29′45″E
- Date: 4 October 2010; 16 years ago

Cause
- Cause: Inconclusive
- Casualties: 10 deaths, 406 injured (120 seriously)
- Operator: MAL Hungarian Aluminium

Spill characteristics
- Volume: ca. 1 million m^{3} (35 million cu. ft.)
- Area: 40 km^{2} (15 sq mi)

A caustic waste reservoir chain collapsed at the Ajkai Timföldgyár alumina plant in Ajka, Veszprém County, in western Hungary in October 2010.

On 4 October 2010, at 12:25 CEST (10:25 UTC), the northwestern corner of the dam of reservoir number 10 collapsed, releasing approximately one million cubic metres (35 million cubic feet) of liquid waste from red mud lakes. The mud was released as a 1–2 m (3–7 ft) wave, flooding several nearby localities, including the village of Kolontár and the town of Devecser. Ten people died, and 150 people were injured. About 40 square kilometres (15 sq mi) of land were initially affected. The spill reached the Danube on 7 October 2010.

It was not initially clear how the containment at the reservoir had been breached, although the accident came after a particularly wet summer in Hungary, as in other parts of central Europe. Police have seized documents from the Ajkai Timföldgyár plant, although a spokesman for MAL Hungarian Aluminium (MAL Magyar Alumínium Termelő és Kereskedelmi Zrt.), the company that operates the plant, said the last inspection of the pond had shown "nothing untoward". Hungarian Prime Minister Viktor Orbán stated that the cause of the spill was presumably human error.

== Origin of the mud ==
The red mud involved in the accident is a waste product of the Bayer process, which refines bauxite into a form of aluminium oxide called alumina. The mud primarily contains non-aluminium compounds present in the bauxite ore and left as residues after its refining along with sodium hydroxide used to dissolve aluminium oxide. Iron(III) oxide, the compound from which the red colour originates, is the main component, but it also contains other compounds. The mud, which is highly alkaline when it is first produced, is stored in large open-air ponds; It is thought that there are about 30 million tonnes of red mud stored around the Ajkai Timföldgyár plant. According to a press release by MAL, the mud had the following chemical percentage make-up (which expresses the amounts of different elements, not necessarily the actual solids).

Metal oxide	Percentage	Notes
Fe_{2}O_{3} (iron(III) oxide)	40–45%	Gives the red colour of the mud
Al_{2}O_{3} (aluminium oxide)	10–15%	Unextracted aluminium oxide
SiO_{2} (silicon dioxide)	10–15%	Present as sodium- or calcium-alumino-silicate
CaO (calcium oxide)	6–10 %	See also portlandite
TiO_{2} (titanium dioxide)	4–5 %	Impurity present in bauxite
Na_{2}O (bound sodium oxide)	5–6 %	Responsible for the high (alkaline) pH and the chemical burns

Unlike many other mine tailings, red mud does not contain very high levels of heavy metals, although still about seven times the levels in normal soil. Analyses of the mud at Kolontár on behalf of Greenpeace showed levels of chromium 660 mg/kg, arsenic 110 mg/kg and mercury 1.2 mg/kg. The Hungarian government has stated that the mud is "not poisonous", and the Hungarian Academy of Sciences stated that the heavy metal concentrations were not considered dangerous for the environment. In a different news article, the taskforce established to sample the red mud reported high levels of heavy metals in certain samples, but concluded no locations were "dangerously high." The main damage caused by the accident first arose from the high pH of the mud, which was responsible for both severe chemical burns to humans and animals and killing specimens in the rivers and in the contaminated soils. However, after dissipation of acute effects by dilution and progressive carbonation of the sodium hydroxide by CO_{2} from the air, the chronic toxicity of heavy metal traces is expected to be limited by their low solubility and high sorption under slightly alkaline conditions.

== Effects ==
The wave of mud flooded streets in Kolontár, where seven people were confirmed dead, and Devecser, where the flow was powerful enough to move cars and vans. The cause of death of the Kolontár victims has not been formally confirmed; a spokesman for the National Directorate General for Disaster Management (NDGDM, Országos Katasztrófavédelmi Főigazgatóság) said that they had probably drowned. A further six people were still missing 24 hours after the accident.

The NDGDM said that the high-pH mud was considered hazardous and would cause an alkaline reaction on contact if not washed off with clean water. The mayor of Devecser said that 80–90 people had been taken to hospital with chemical burns. Péter Jakabos, a doctor in the hospital in Győr where many of the injured had been taken, said on Magyar Televízió that it might take days for the full extent of any burns to be realised. Magyar Alumínium (MAL) said that the mud was not considered to contain toxic elements according to EU standards. Initial measurements by the NDGDM showed the sludge to be extremely basic, with a pH value of 13.

The waste initially resulted in massive death to wildlife in and around the Marcal river. The spill reached the Danube on 7 October, prompting countries located further down the river (Croatia, Serbia, Romania, Bulgaria) to develop emergency plans in response. The long term effects on sediments in the Tornar and Marcal rivers are considered minor.

On 11 October, the Hungarian government announced that the managing director of MAL had been arrested, to be charged with "criminal negligence leading to a public catastrophe". Also on the 11th, the government took control of MAL, appointing a commissioner to manage the company. The government planned to focus on compensation for the incident, job security, and identifying further locations at risk of accidents.

== Containment and cleanup ==
Apart from the immediate effects of the wave of red mud, there was also concern for a possible contamination of Hungary's waterways. The Torna (Hungarian pronunciation: [ˈtornɒ]) river runs through the affected area, and emergency workers were pouring tonnes of plaster into the waterway to try to bind the sludge and prevent it from continuing downstream. The Torna joins the Marcal (Hungarian pronunciation: [ˈmɒrt͡sɒl]) river at Karakó, in Vas County; the Marcal joins the Rába river just above Győr, in Győr-Moson-Sopron County, while the Rába itself joins the Danube at Győr.

The day after the accident, Environmental State Secretary Zoltán Illés ordered the suspension of the alumina production at the plant and the reconstruction of the dam. The following day, the chairman of the company said in a radio interview that he would like to restart production over the weekend (5–6 days after the Monday accident); the plant reopened on 15 October, with full production expected to resume by the 19th.

The Hungarian government initially estimated that cleanup would take at least a year and cost tens of millions of dollars.

The Hungarian Government activated the EU Civil Protection Mechanism for urgent international assistance at 7:36PM on 7 October. The European Union Monitoring and Information Centre (MIC) communicated the request for expert assistance to the 30 participating countries (27 EU member states, Iceland, Liechtenstein, Norway).

The former director of the MAL plant, Zoltán Bakonyi, and 14 other employees were arrested over charges of negligence, violations of waste management and environmental pollution on 11 October 2010, but were acquitted of all charges in January 2016.

By 12 October 2010, a secondary dam beyond the remainder of the original had been almost entirely completed, after being built to contain additional sludge that was expected to overflow after another portion of the original dam collapsed.

On 13 October, the government nationalized the company, the bill making this possible having been passed by the Parliament one day earlier.

In 2019, a criminal negligence case closed with the conviction of 10 people - managerial staff and employees - who were found guilty for security protocol infractions relating to waste storage and processing.

== Gallery ==
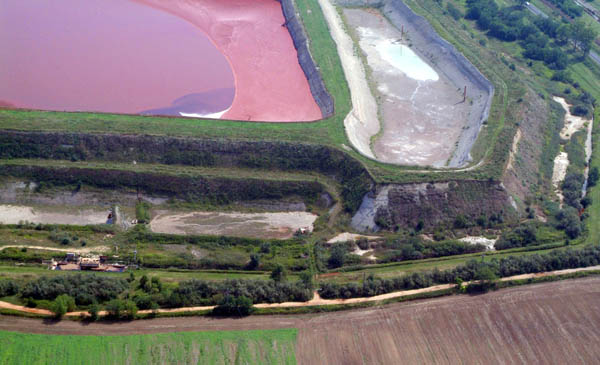
Reservoir in 2007 before the breach

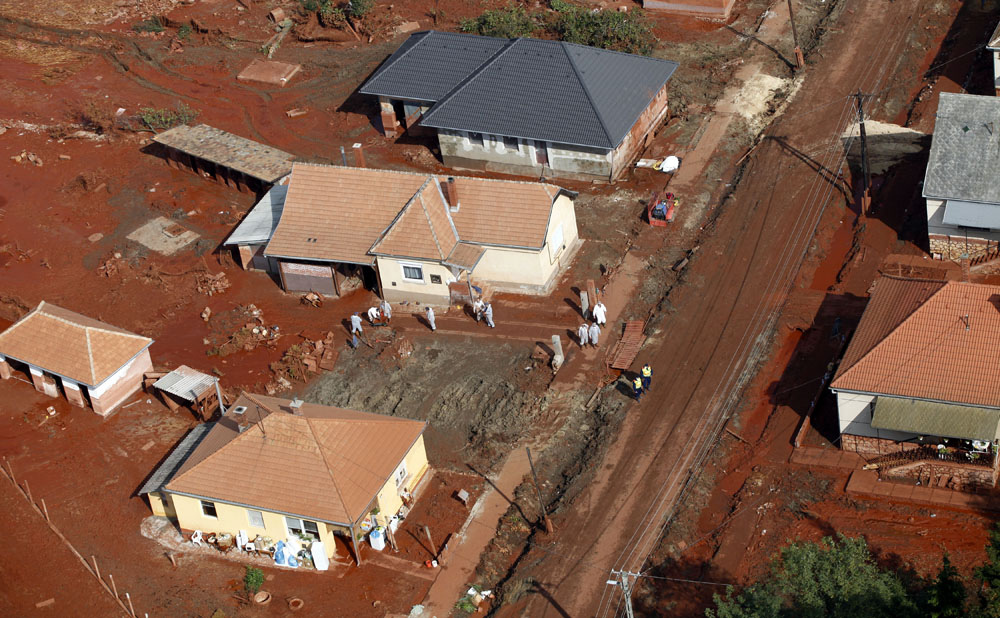
Aftermath of spill

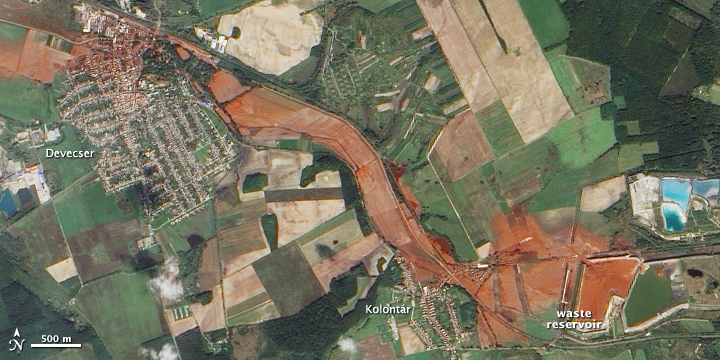
Satellite view of extent of spill

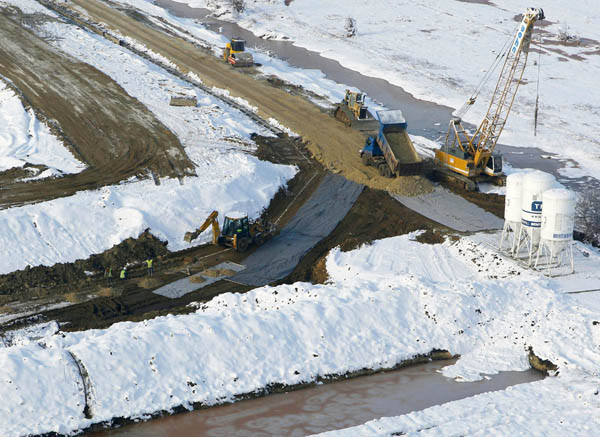
Clean up and repair works

== See also ==
- 1971 Certej dam failure
- 1998 Residue dam wall collapse of the Aznalcollar mine
- 2000 Baia Mare cyanide spill
- Aberfan disaster
- Brumadinho dam disaster
- Crisis situations and unrest in Europe since 2000
- List of non-water floods
- Hydrology of Hungary
- Kingston Fossil Plant coal fly ash slurry spill
- Mariana dam disaster
- Hpakant jade mine disaster
- Olivier Dubuquoy
- Val di Stava dam collapse
