= Rockwood & Company shipping department fire =

1919 chocolate company fire in Brooklyn, U.S.

- Date: May 12, 1919
- Time: Started around 1:00 a.m. (Eastern Time)
- Location: Rockwood & Company factory, Brooklyn, New York, United States; 40°41′51″N 73°58′05″W

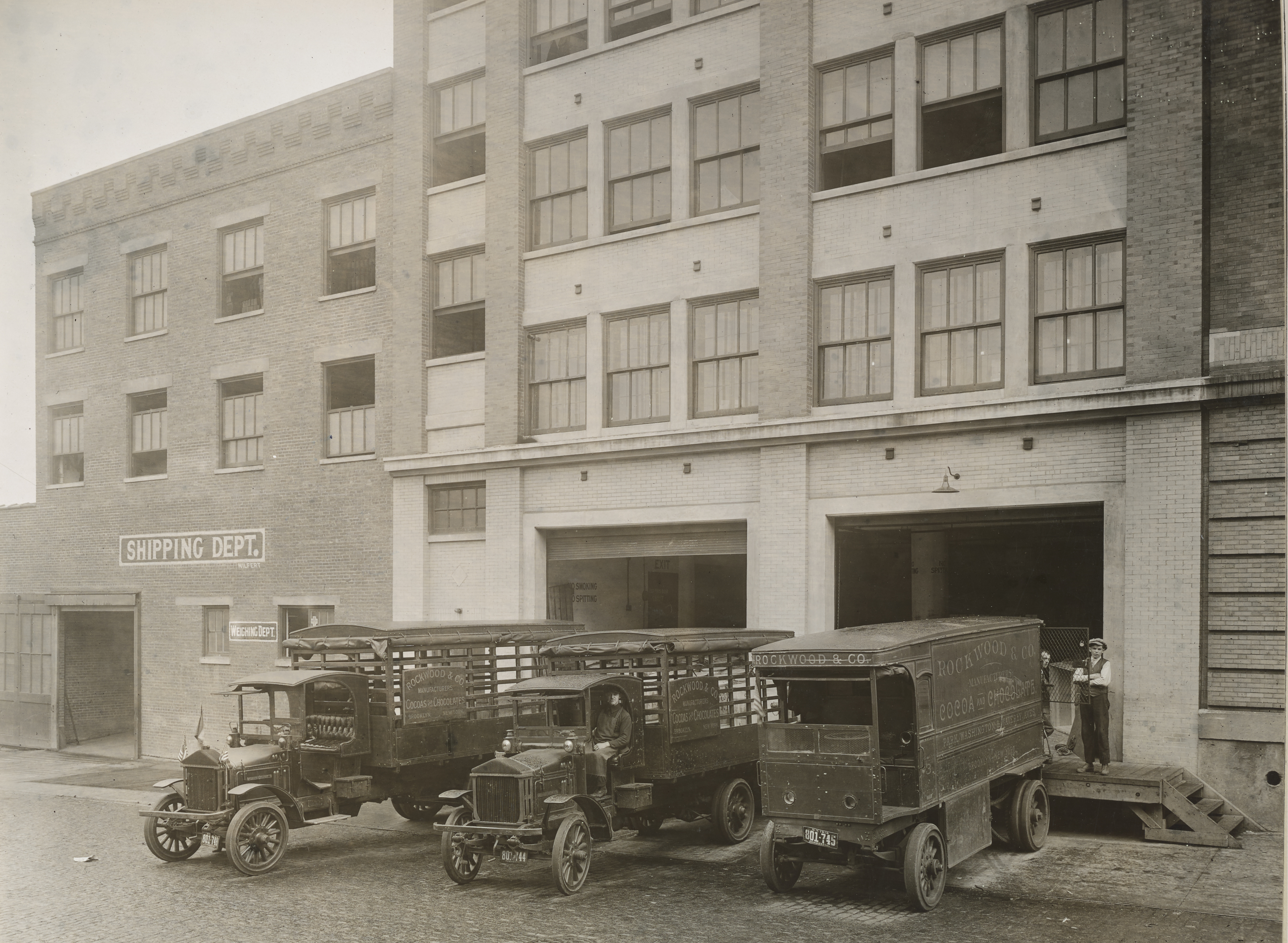
Exterior of shipping department, 1918

On May 12, 1919, a fire broke out in the shipping department of the Rockwood & Company chocolate factory complex on Flushing Avenue in Brooklyn. At around 1 am, materials and products stored on the second floor of the department are suspected to have caught fire by spontaneous combustion. The New York Fire Department were unable to save the building but prevented the spread of the fire to the rest of the plant. Firefighting water washed a mixture of molten chocolate and butter out onto neighboring streets where it blocked storm drains and caused a flood sufficient to "float a rowboat for two blocks". Local children crowded to the site to taste the mixture. The fire was extinguished by around 11 am and caused damage in excess of $75,000 (equivalent to $1,392,754 in 2025).

== Description ==
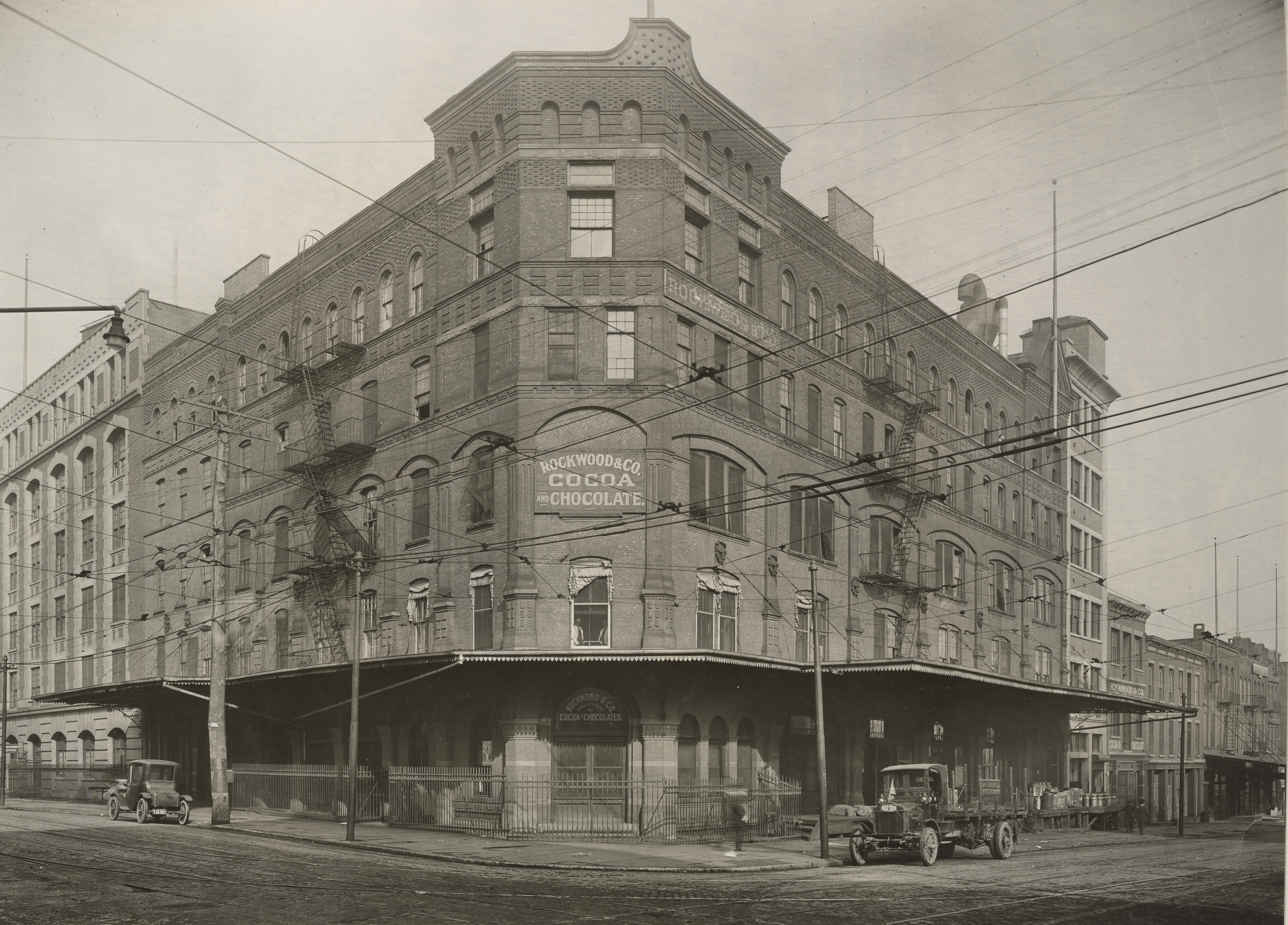
Front of main plant, 1918

Rockwood & Company, manufacturers of chocolate products, established a factory in Brooklyn in 1910 in block 1874 bounded by Flushing Avenue on the north, Park Avenue on the south, Waverley Avenue on the west and Washington Avenue on the east. The main factory was located on the Park Avenue frontage and the company gradually took over the rest of the block, incorporating existing structures built for the Van Glahn Brothers grocery wholesalers. By 1919 the site's shipping department, handling incoming raw materials and outgoing manufactured products, was located towards the north, Flushing Avenue, end of the block.

The surviving elements of the factory were originally listed in the National Register of Historic Places as part of the Rockwood Chocolate Factory Historic District but now form part of the Wallabout Industrial Historic District.

== Fire ==
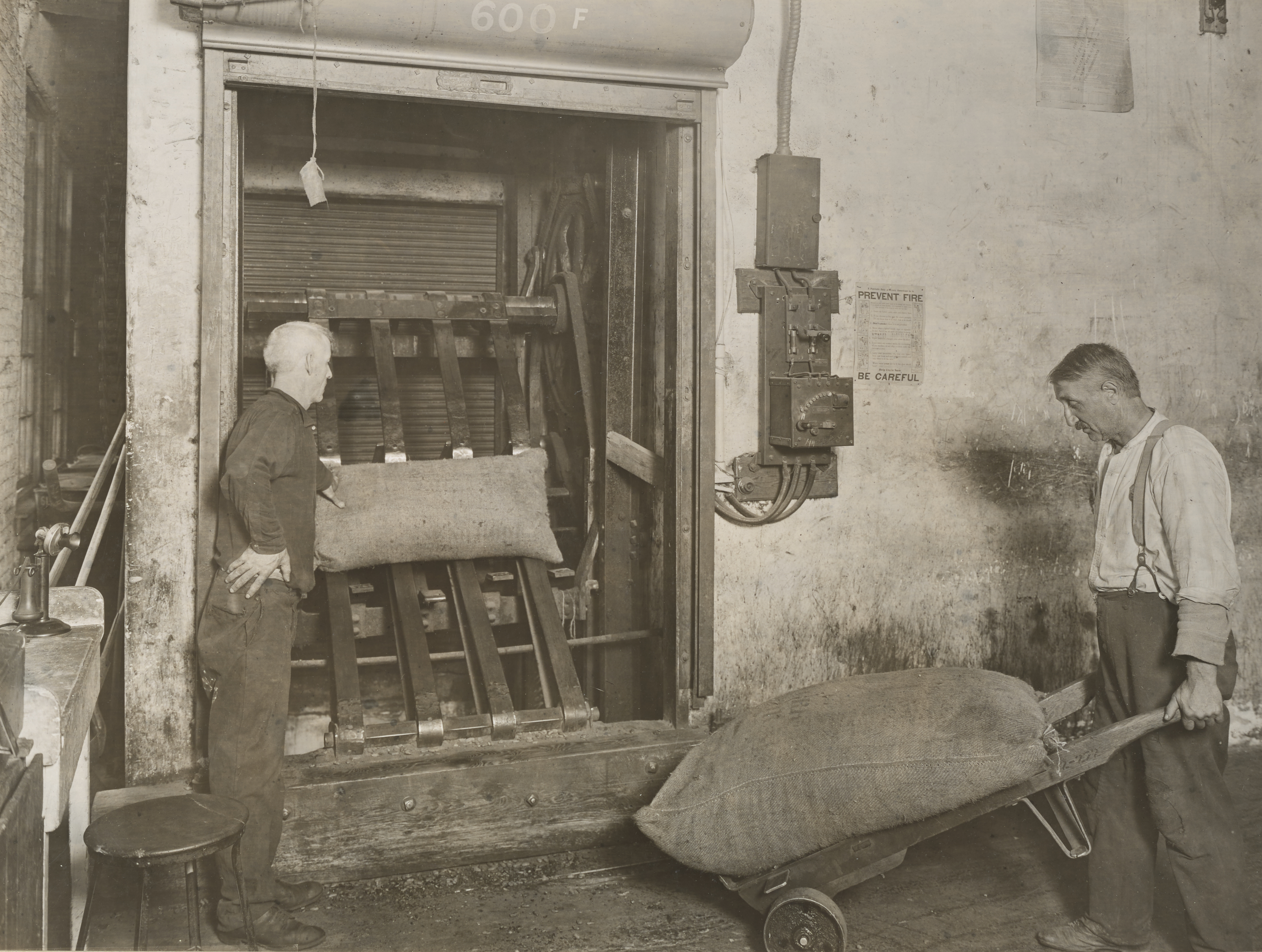
Raw cocoa arriving in burlap sacks, 1918. A "Prevent Fire ... Be Careful" poster is on the wall.

Just after 1 am on May 12, 1919, the factory watchman spotted smoke on the second floor of the shipping department and, tracing it to its source, discovered a fire. The department stored large quantities of cocoa beans and finished chocolate bars in burlap sacks and it was later thought that spontaneous combustion within these materials caused the fire. The watchman alerted the New York City Fire Department by means of an alarm in the building and crews from a nearby firehouse were on site within minutes.

Deputy Fire Chief Fred W. Gooderson attended soon after the first alarm and increased the responding resource by declaring first a two-alarm and then a three-alarm fire. Shortly after the three-alarm declaration Deputy Fire Chief John O'Hara arrived on the scene and took command. Deputy Fire Commissioner William F. Thompson and president of Rockwood & Company William T. Jones also attended the fire. Responding crews included the fire department's Engine 209, Engine 211, Truck 102 and Truck 103.

== Flood ==
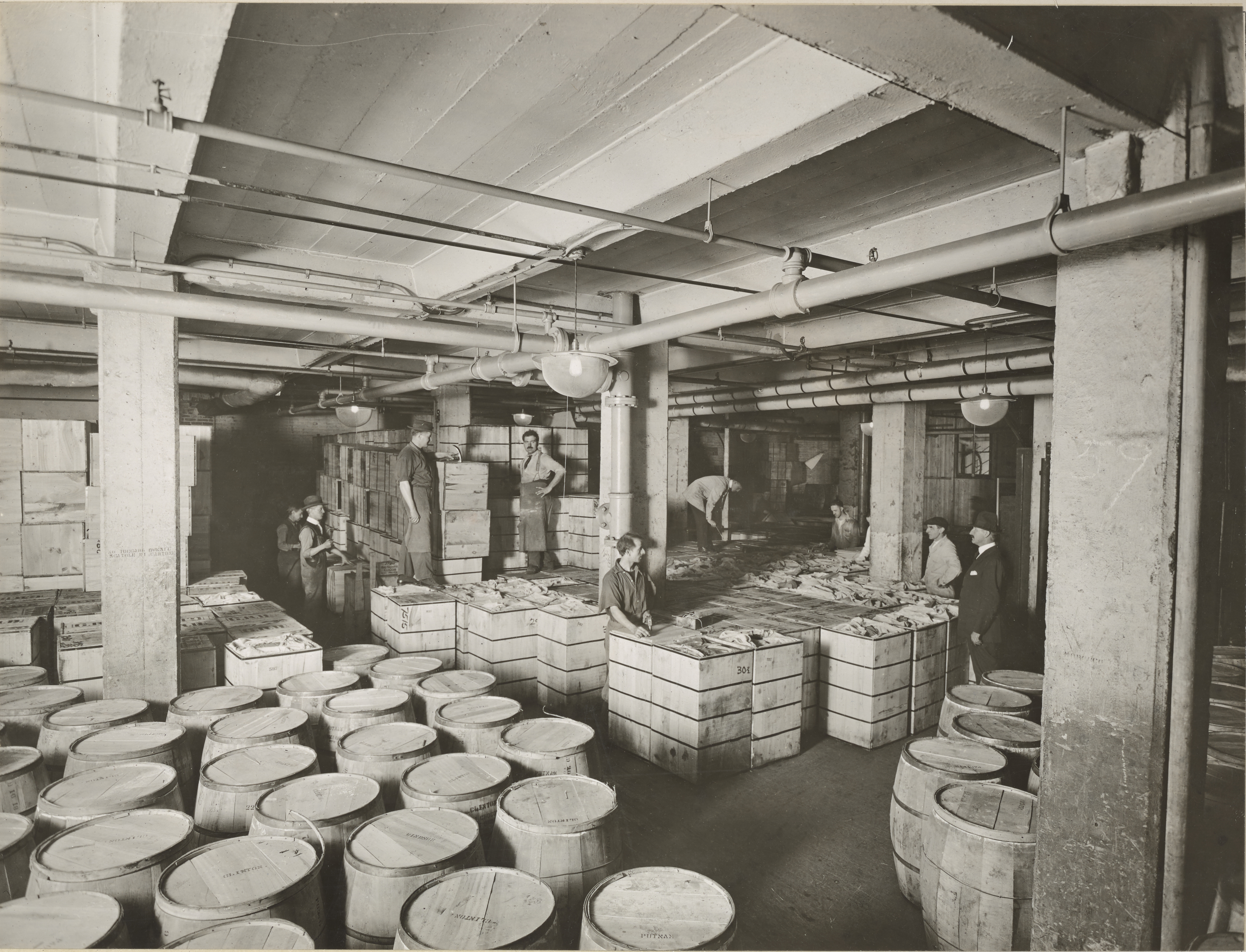
Packing of finished products, 1918

The fire spread to the third floor of the shipping department which stored raw ingredients including cocoa and butter. Firefighting water washed a mixture of this material and molten chocolate onto Flushing Avenue. The sugar and butter separated from the mixture and formed a crust that blocked the street's storm drains, leading to a flood. The mixture became greasy and slippery as it cooled, which hindered the movements of the firemen.

Waverley Avenue was described in a contemporary Standard Union report as being coated in butter and chocolate. A report in the Brooklyn Daily Eagle described an "ocean of fudge ... flooding the street ... like lava" and noted that it was sufficiently deep to "float a rowboat for two blocks along Flushing Avenue". The flood attracted "a thousand and one" local children, keen to taste the mixture. The police initially made no attempt to stop them but around an hour after their arrival truant officers began collecting the children to take them to their schools.

The firefighters decided that the shipping department could not be saved and concentrated their efforts on protecting adjoining buildings. They were successful in preventing the fire's spread and the blaze was all but extinguished by 11 am. A team of firefighters afterwards remained on site to pump out water from the building's basement. The New York City street cleaning team, assisted by the sewerage department, removed the chocolate and butter from the nearby streets.

The main part of the chocolate plant was not affected but the shipping department was destroyed in its entirety. Contemporary reports estimated the damage at a minimum of $75,000 (equivalent to $1,392,754 in 2025) or $100,000 (equivalent to $1,857,006 in 2025).

== See also ==
- List of non-water floods
