= György Bakondi =

Hungarian lawyer

- Bakondi György
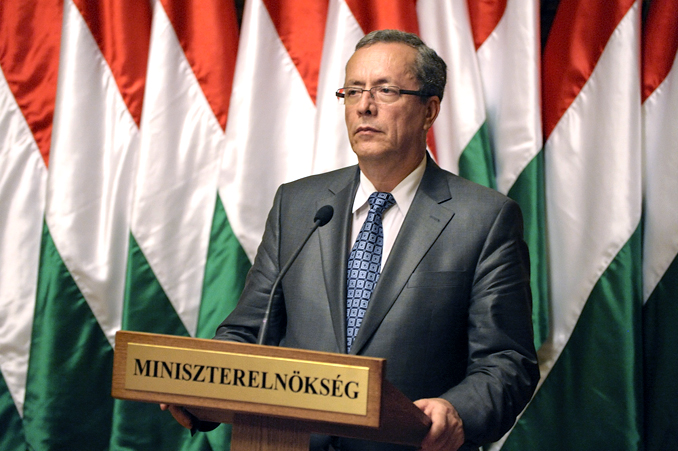
- György Bakondi in October 2010.
- Born: October 15, 1952; Budapest, Hungary
- Education: kossuth Lajos Military College; József Attila University
- Occupations: Border guard, lawyer, government commissioner

György Bakondi (Budapest, Hungary 15 October 1952 –) border guard, lawyer, between 2000 and 2002 as well as from 1 July 2010 to 15 April 2015 Senior Director of Disaster Management Directorate of Interior Ministry, government commissioner.

== Education ==
He maturated at Verseghy Ferenc Grammar School in Szolnok in 1971, and then went to Szentendre to the Kossuth Lajos Military College, where he got diploma as a teacher and commander of border guards. He studied law between 1977 and 1982 at József Attila University. He passed his legal exam in 1997. He was in the United States of America on learning trip twice, in 1990 and in 1992.

== Career ==
He started his career at József Attila University as political officer responsible for Communist ideology, he became the vice commander at border crossing of Röszke. After change of regime in Hungary, he was appointed as the vice commander of Border Guard, to a role, which he fulfilled from 1991 to 1999. He became General in 1994, and he was pensioned off in 1999 (at the age of 47). During the First Orbán Government, after floods at the Upper-Tisza, he was appointed as government commissioner responsible for reconstructions after the flood". He got this position both in 1999 and in 2001.

In 2000, at the foundation of National Disaster Management High Directorate (OKF), Sándor Pintér, Interior Minister appointed him as the leader of the organisation. After inauguration of new government, his appointment was not extended, so he had to leave the position at the end of 2002. At the same time László Keller, Under-Secretary responsible for public money, denounced him in connection with a case dated from 1999. Bill was about several homes, which were built with open hearth furnace technology, which were built from public money without public procurement, with Bakondi's approval. Police closed investigation in 2003, which was approved by the public prosecutors as well in 2003.

Between 2003 and 2010 he worked for a lawyer company as a lawyer and co-owner, specialised primarily to public procurement. He was a member of the UD Zrt's supervisory committee, and he represented the company as well in front of the courts.

Second Orbán Cabinet reactivated him on the summer of 2010. At his first position he was government commissioner responsible for reconstructions after flood, and later he was appointed as the leader of Disaster Management. On 15 June 2010 he became Major General of Fire Marshals, After Ajka alumina plant accident in October 2010, he was appointed as the head of MAL Zrt. in 2012 the government extended the rights of Disaster Management High Directorate. In his new position, there were several conflicts with the fire marshals, who felt, he took away their name, traditions, and they had problems regarding who were appointed as their leaders. There were several court cases during his period. These were made against fire marshals, who made objections against the system.

On 1 December 2012 he got a new position, when he was nominated as government commissioner responsible for winter related affairs. He led the protection measures during Floods on Danube, then he became the commissioner of Prime Minister responsible for reconstructions. He took this role to the end of August. On 15 April 2015 he was pensioned off again, but on 30 July he was the one, as the Interior Security High Advisor of Prime Minister, who announced the end of illegal crossing of border near the Hungarian border barrier.

== Personal life ==
He is married. He has three children. He can speak English and Russian languages. He is Honorary Associate Professor of National University of Public Service.

== Orders ==
- Order of Merit of the Republic of Hungary Commander"s Cross with Star – Military division (2015)

== Sources ==
- On the home page of BM OKF
- Bakondi György kőkeményen lojális – Origo, 21 March 2013
