= Rockwood & Company =

Former chocolate manufacturer in New York City

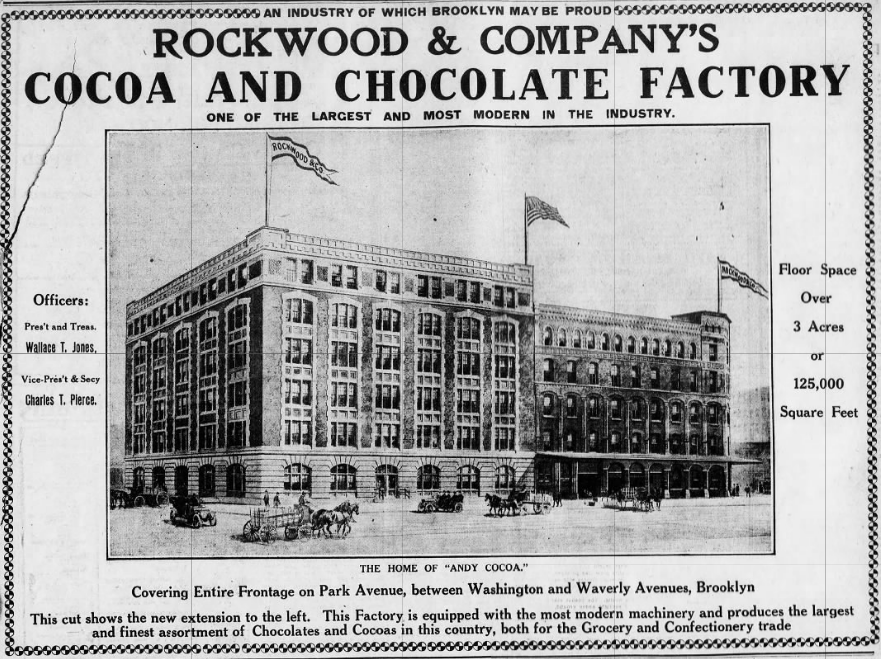
1910 advertisement in the Brooklyn Daily Eagle during construction of a new Rockwood & Company chocolate factory building

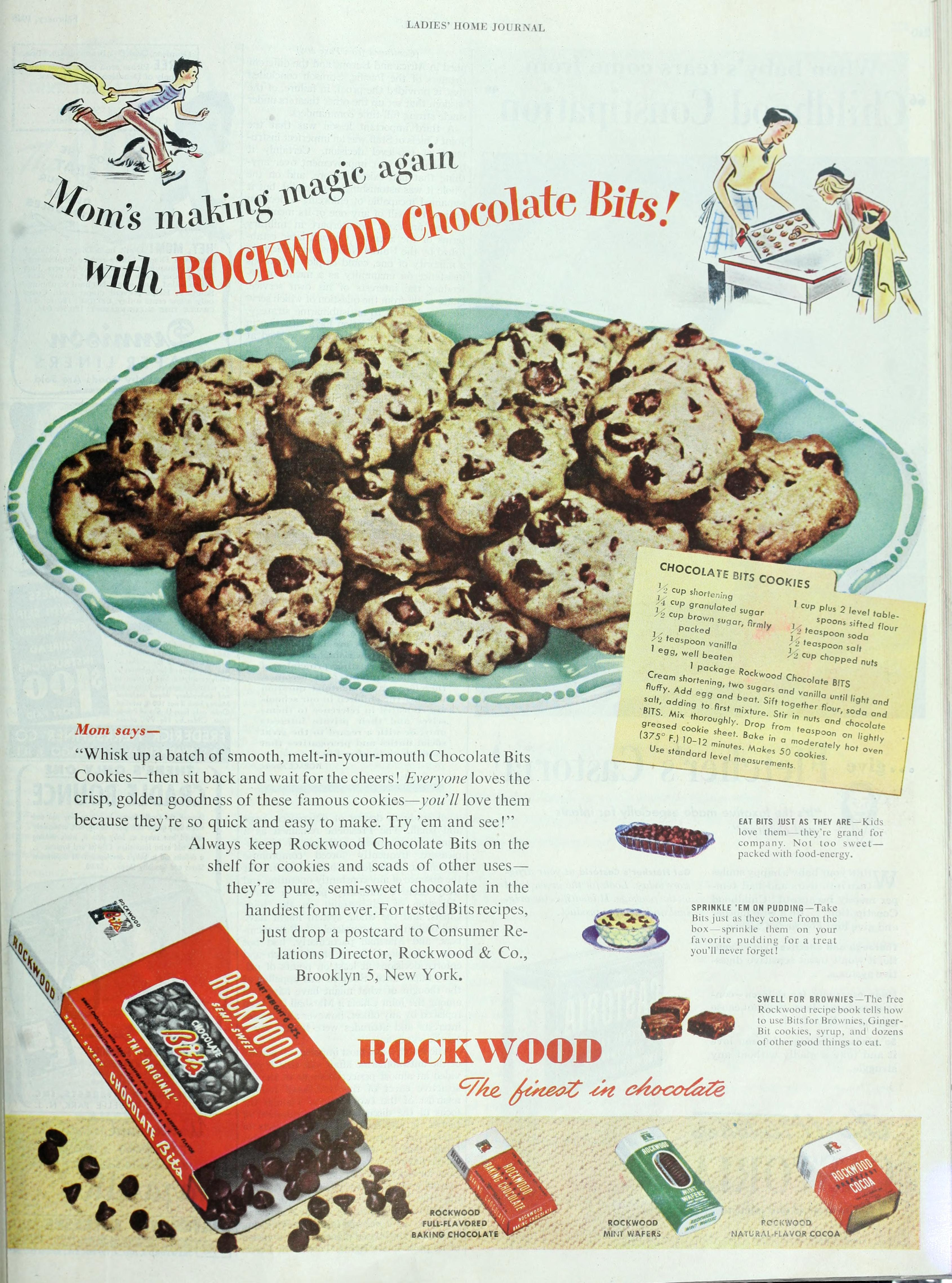
1948 advertisement in Ladies' Home Journal for Rockwood Chocolate Bits.

Rockwood & Company was a New York City-based chocolatier which operated from 1886 until 1957. It coordinated the industry's first resale price contracts, operated the largest chocolate factory in New York, and was the second largest producer of chocolate in the United States, after the Hershey Company. Founded in the borough of Manhattan, it moved to the Brooklyn neighborhood of Wallabout, gradually expanding its footprint to occupy most of a city block. In 1919, a fire led to a flood of chocolate in the street, attracting a crowd of children. Rockwood & Company sold the factory to the Sweets Company of America in 1957, who used it to produce Tootsie Rolls until it closed in 1967. The Rockwood & Company factory complex was listed on the National Register of Historic Places in 1983, which was later merged into the Wallabout Industrial Historic District. It was converted to luxury apartments in 1996.

== Business history ==
Wallace T. Jones and W. E. Rockwood founded Rockwood & Company in 1886 and originally operated a chocolate factory on Cherry Street in Manhattan until 1904, when it moved to Brooklyn. At the time, it was the second largest producer of chocolate in the country, next to Hershey's. It processed raw cocoa into chocolate and made coatings, bars, cocoa, baking chocolate, and other confections. Rockwood may have been the first to introduce chocolate sprinkles (marketed as "Decorettes") to the United States circa 1915, and in the mid-1950s its bestselling product was chocolate chips (marketed as "Chocolate Bits").

The company's treasurer, William M. Evans, was elected president in 1923 and moved to the role of chairman of the board in 1933 until his death in 1944. Jones' son, Wallace Thaxter Jones, became president in 1933. The factory's 1,000 workers went on strike for eleven days in August 1937, after a Pennsylvania chocolate workers' strike earlier that year. A few months later, Rockwood was part of the industry's first resale price contracts when it ensured its product, Pecan Feast, would be sold for a minimum of 5 cents.

When the younger Jones died in 1946, H. Russell Burbank was promoted from executive vice president to president of Rockwood & Co. Among its marketing activities Rockwood awarded $1,000 scholarships to winners of the Pillsbury bake-off if they used Rockwood products. This tactic bore fruit when an entry for "Starlight Mint Surprise Cookies" won the $10,000 second prize at the 1949 contest, and the recipe was included in packages of both Pillsbury and Rockwood products. The New York Times reported on a string of cocoa bean thefts at the factory in 1954, and how the police followed a truck driver who was selling part of his cargo. Two hundred thousand dollars of cocoa beans were estimated to have been stolen, at the then-price of 54¢ a pound, dropped off at a Gowanus Canal warehouse while being transported to the Erie Basin.

The company was affected by a global shortage and rise in the price of cocoa beans that year to more than 50¢ a pound. Spending more on beans, but unable to change the retail price, the company started losing money. As they looked to sell the company, Jay Pritzker purchased a controlling interest of Rockwood stock, stopping the production of cocoa butter in order to sell cocoa beans themselves through a loophole which would avoid paying tax on the sale. He traded the beans to shareholders for more of the company's stock. His pricing ensured shareholders would want to sell, and presented an opportunity for arbitrage that Graham-Newman took advantage of, buying shares and immediately trading them to Pritzker for more valuable beans. A young Warren Buffett, who worked at Graham-Newman, bought shares but did not participate in arbitrage, understanding from Pritzker's point of view that, in the end, the more profitable company would be worth more. The stock price more than quintupled in the end.

There was another strike in 1957, when the workers, who were members of the Bakery and Confectionary Workers International Union, stopped work amid concerns over severance payments in case the company went out of business. The following month, April 1957, the Rockwood Chocolate division was sold to the Sweets Company of America (now Tootsie Roll Industries). As part of the deal, the union sacrificed half of their vacation pay.

== Brooklyn factory complex ==
The original Brooklyn building is on the corner of Park Avenue and Washington Avenue, in the Wallabout neighborhood, which was a major industrial center at the time. It was initially constructed in 1890 for the Van Glahn Brothers grocer. Rockwood began leasing the space in 1904, having outgrown its Manhattan factory, and expanded gradually through the 1910s. It acquired the rest of the Van Glahn properties and erected new buildings, first northwards towards Flushing Avenue and then west towards Waverly Ave. Among the new construction was a new factory on the northwest part of the block, on the corner of Waverly and Park. Parfitt Brothers designed it, with a showroom on the first floor designed by Ernest Flagg. According to the Brooklyn Daily Eagle in 1910, it was the largest chocolate factory in the state and one of the largest in the country. It increased the total factory floor space to more than 125,000 square feet.

After the factory was sold to Sweets Company of America in 1957, it produced Tootsie Rolls and operated for ten more years, before closing in 1967. In 1983, it was listed on the National Register of Historic Places as the Rockwood Chocolate Factory Historic District, but remained vacant until 1996, when a developer purchased it and converted it into luxury apartments. The factory complex, and the rest of the historic district, was incorporated into the larger Wallabout Industrial Historic District in 2012.

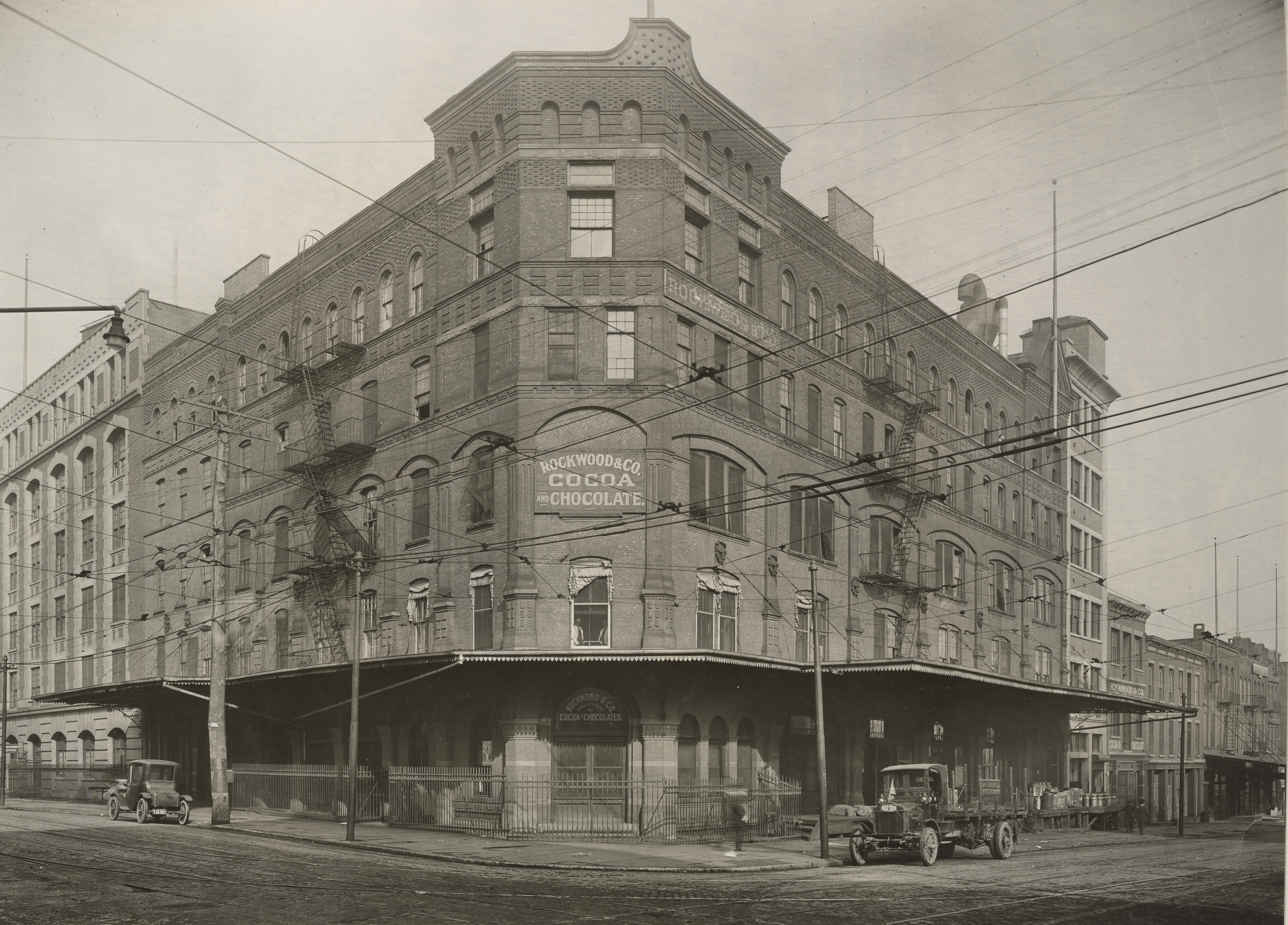
Rockwood & Company building in 1918

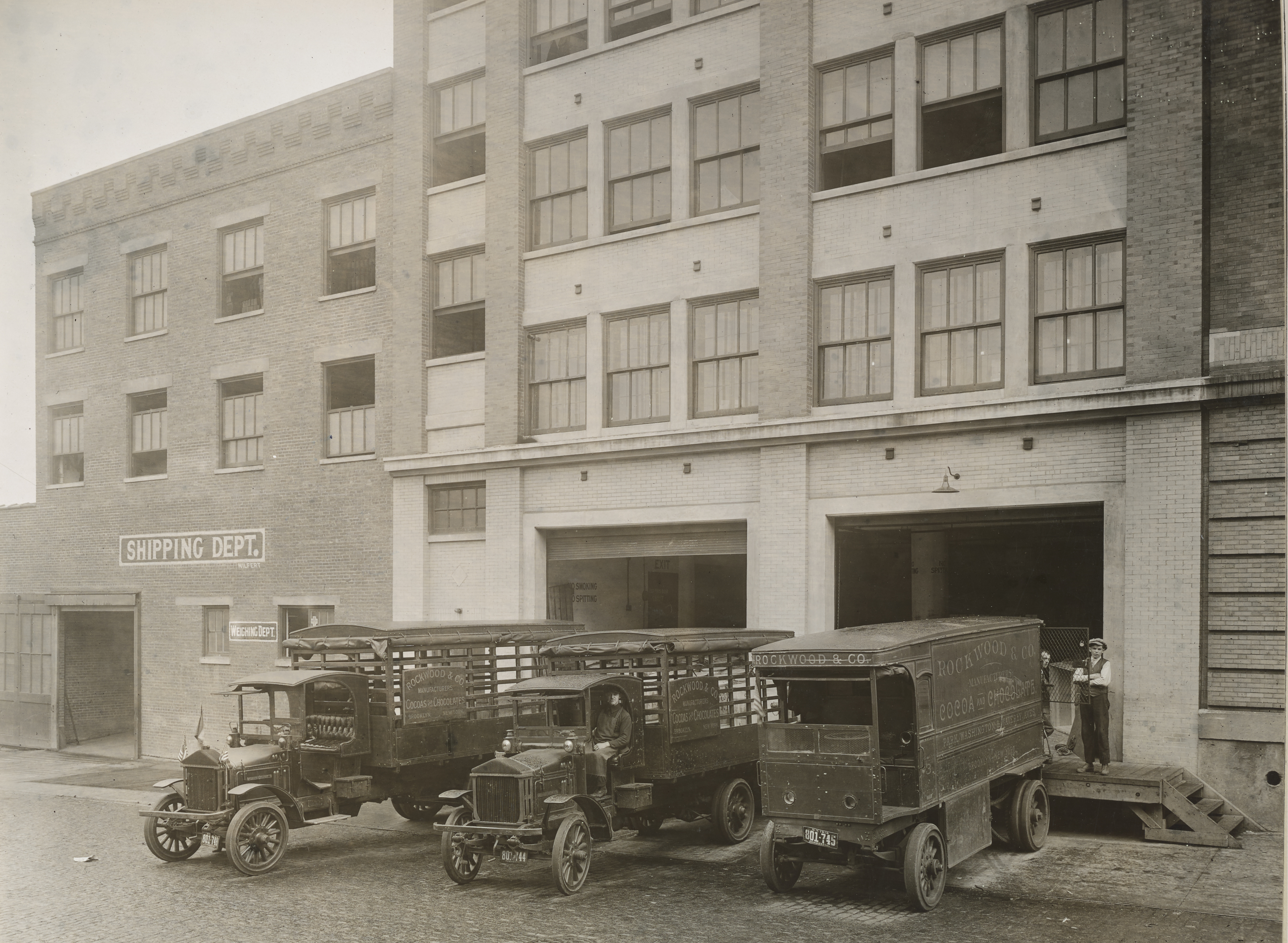
The Rockwood shipping department in 1918, one year before it burned down.

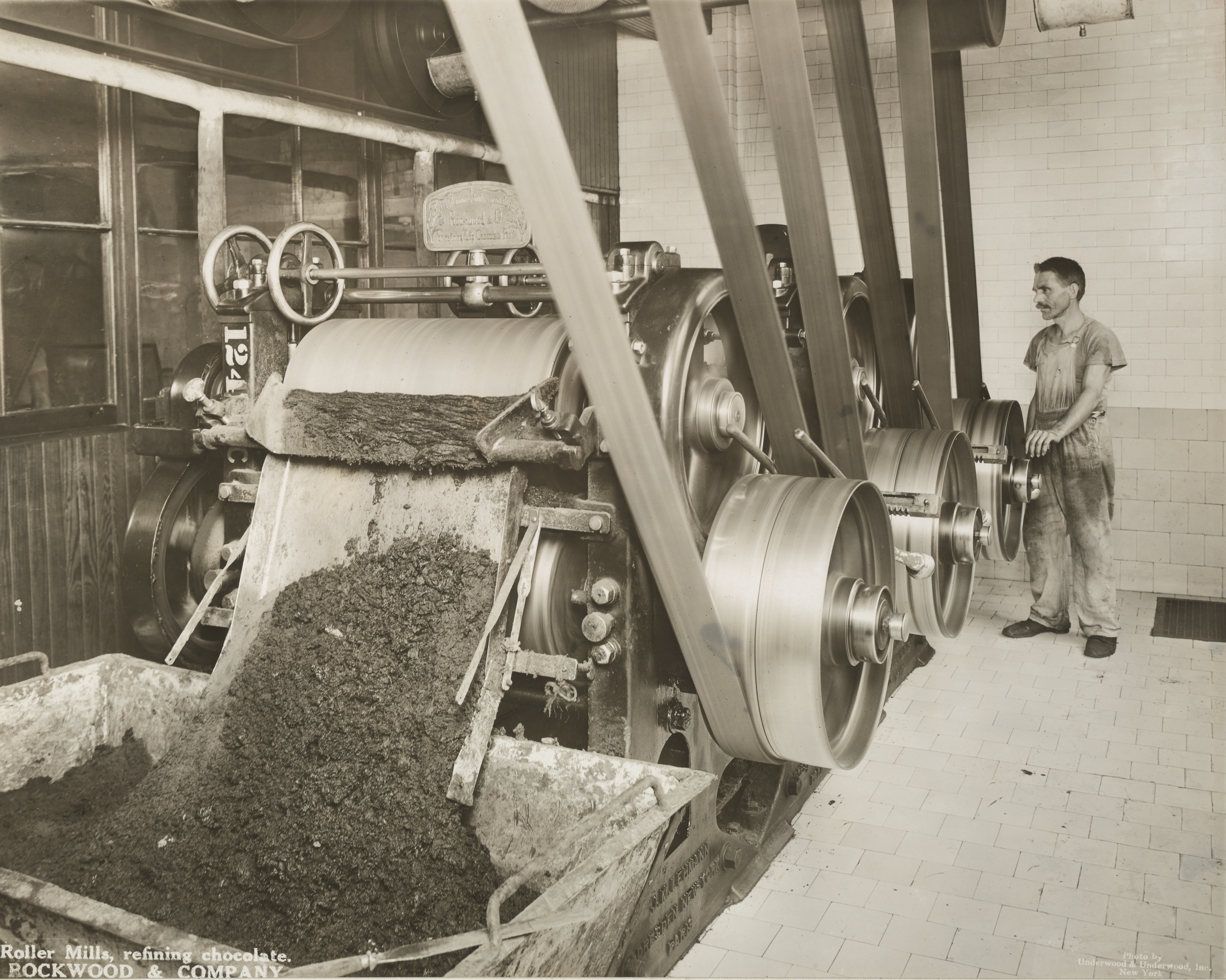
Roller mills inside the factory

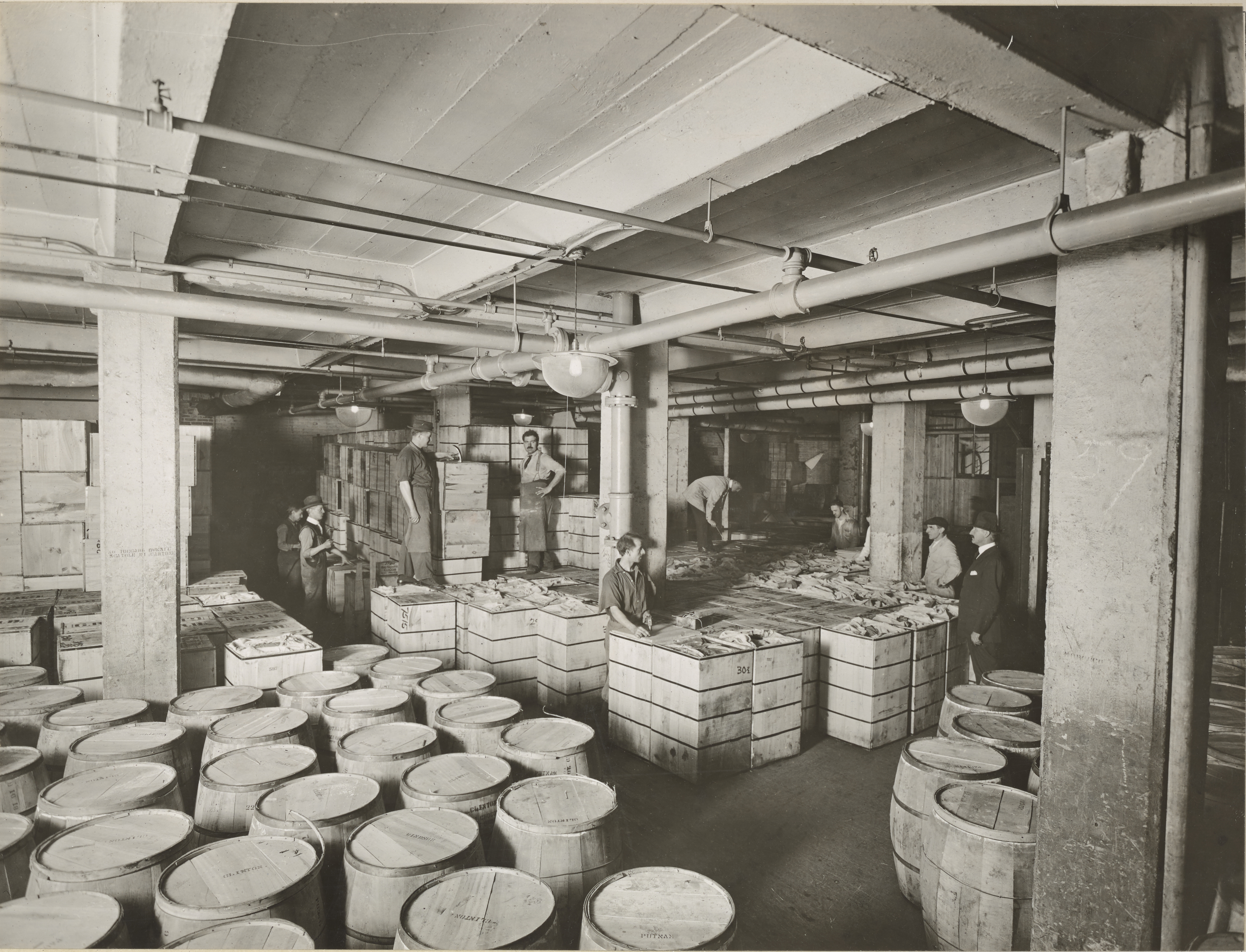
Packing department with barrels of Belgian cocoa in 1917 or 1918

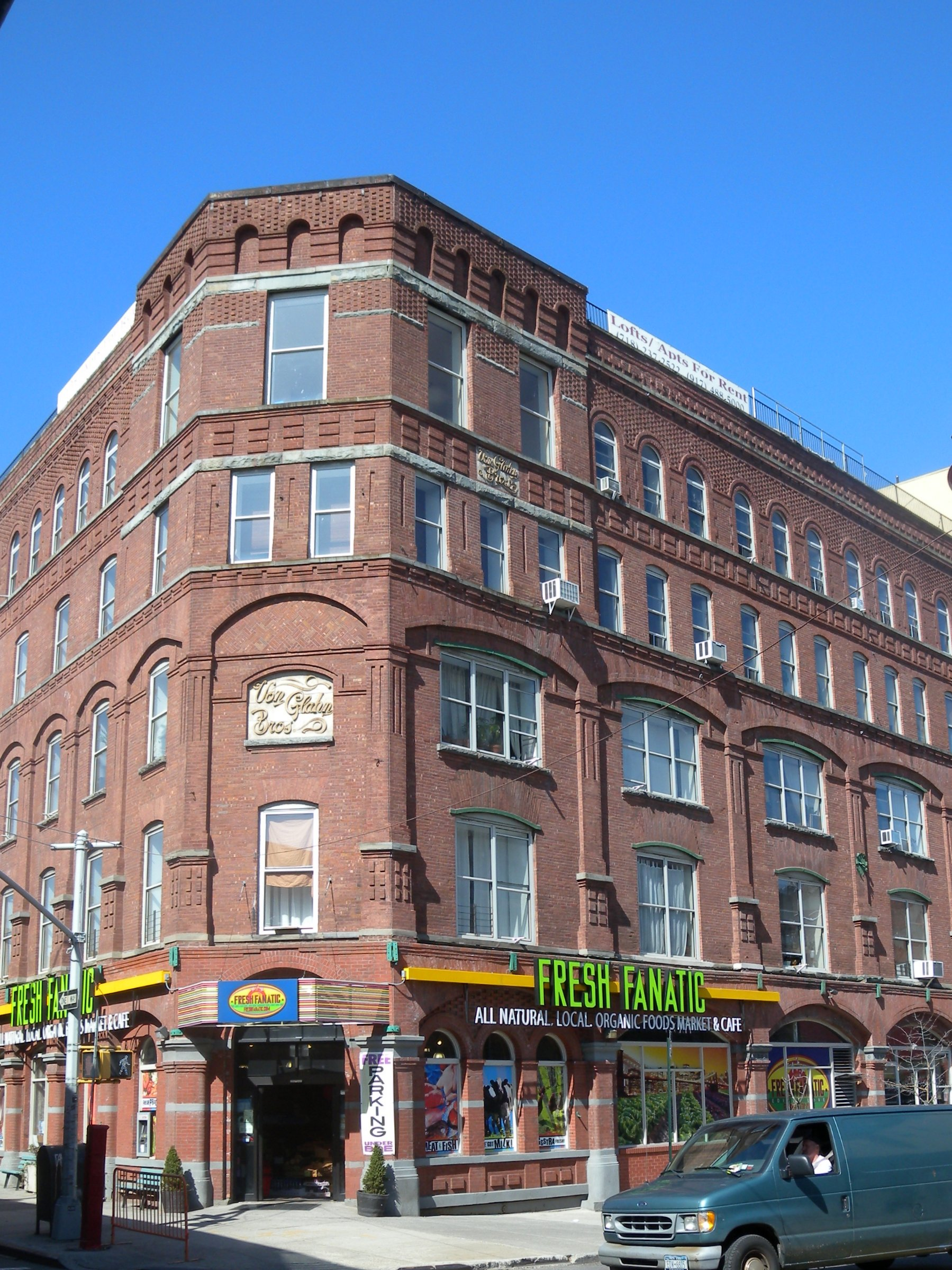
Rockwood & Company building in 2012, with a market on the ground floor

== Fires and chocolate flood ==
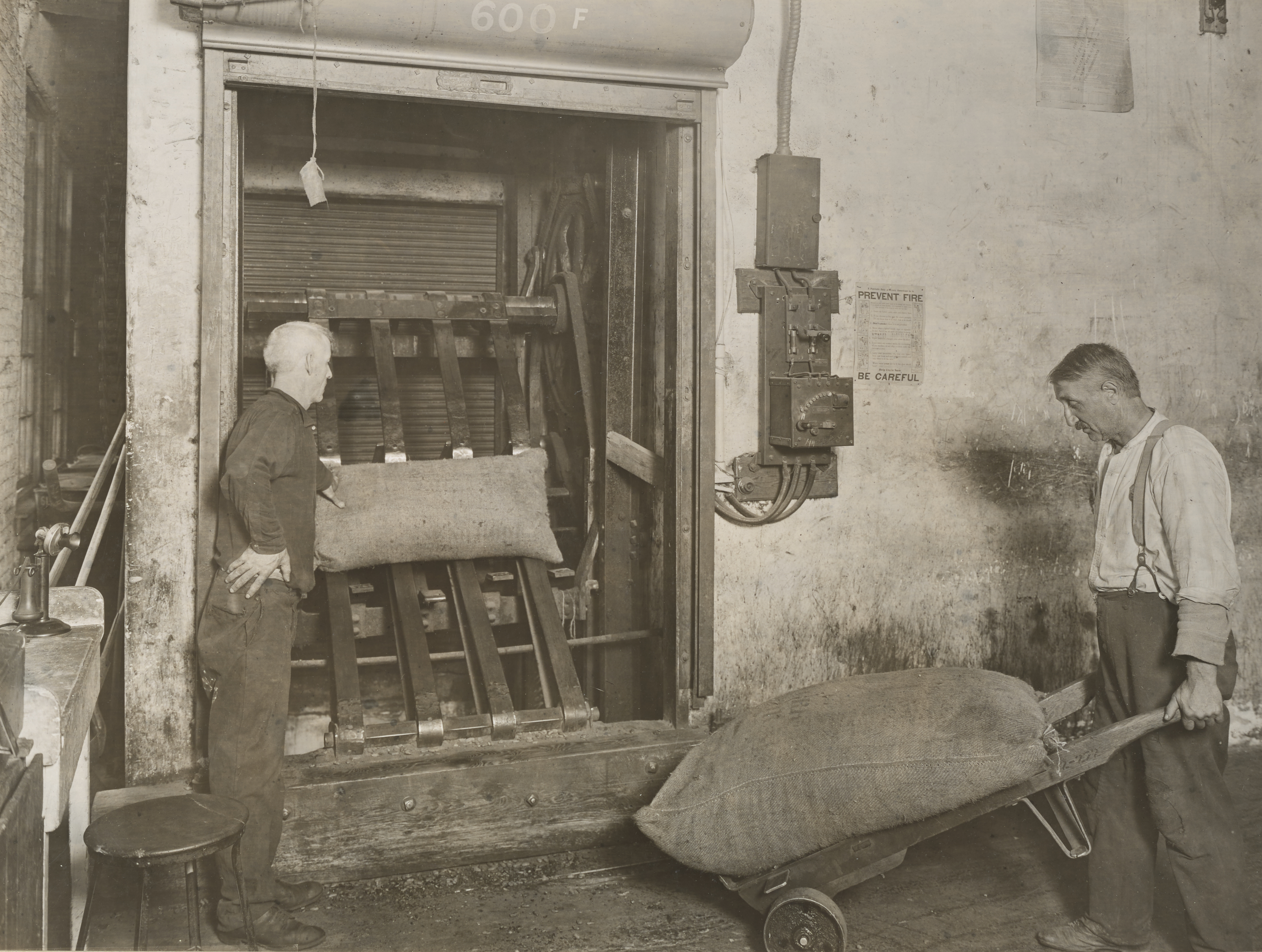
Raw cocoa arrives at the factory in 1917 or 1918. A "Prevent Fire ... Be Careful" poster is on the wall.

So the whole neighborhood began to resemble that of the Pied Piper of Hamlin -- it swarmed with children bound for the big fire. And when they reached the scene various exclamation of delight punctuated the air. Little fellows fell on their knees before the oncoming flood and dipped it up greedily with grimy fingers.

— Brooklyn Daily Eagle, May 12, 1919, p. 3

Early in the morning on May 12, 1919, a fire broke out on the second floor of the shipping department (29 Waverly Avenue), where large quantities of chocolate was stored in burlap bags. A night watchman noticed smoke just after 1:00 AM and sounded an alarm. Because the fire began in the middle of the night, it burned for longer than it would have later in the day, though was confined to the one building. Firefighters responded within minutes, including Deputy Chief of the Fire Department of New York (FDNY) Fred W. Gooderson. A second and third alarm were sent shortly thereafter, at which point Deputy Chief John O'Hara arrived and took charge. Firefighters worked for three hours to put out the fire as it spread to the third floor and Rockwood & Company president William T. Jones looked on.

The water firefighters shot into the building ran back out, mixed with melted chocolate. The sugar and butter solidified, blocking the sewers and the street and covering the sidewalks, making the surface on which the firefighters stood slippery and more difficult to work on. The Eagle report about the fire focused on the "thousand and one urchins hurried to the fire ... for word had passed along the river front that an ocean of fudge was flooding the street ... accessible to all who ventured near". Eventually, someone called the truant department, leading to "chocolate-gorged truants, some with far-away looks in their eyes [hauled] off to school".

At some point during the blaze, firefighters decided the company's shipping building could not be saved and focused on the surrounding buildings. The shipping building was destroyed, but they were successful in saving its neighbors. The fire was extinguished by around 11:00 AM, having caused damages between $75,000-$100,000 (equivalent to $1,300,000-$1,800,000 in 2023).

In 1938, another fire spread from neighboring Screen-Droge Paper Company, causing more than $100,000 in damage (equivalent to $2,300,000 in 2025). It was caused by an employee at the paper company, who dropped a cigarette. According to the New York Times, the smoke was heavy, making it difficult for firefighters, ten of whom were overcome by smoke.

== See also ==
- New York Cocoa Exchange
- Great Molasses Flood, another 1919 industrial food flood
- List of non-water floods
