= MAL Hungarian Aluminium =

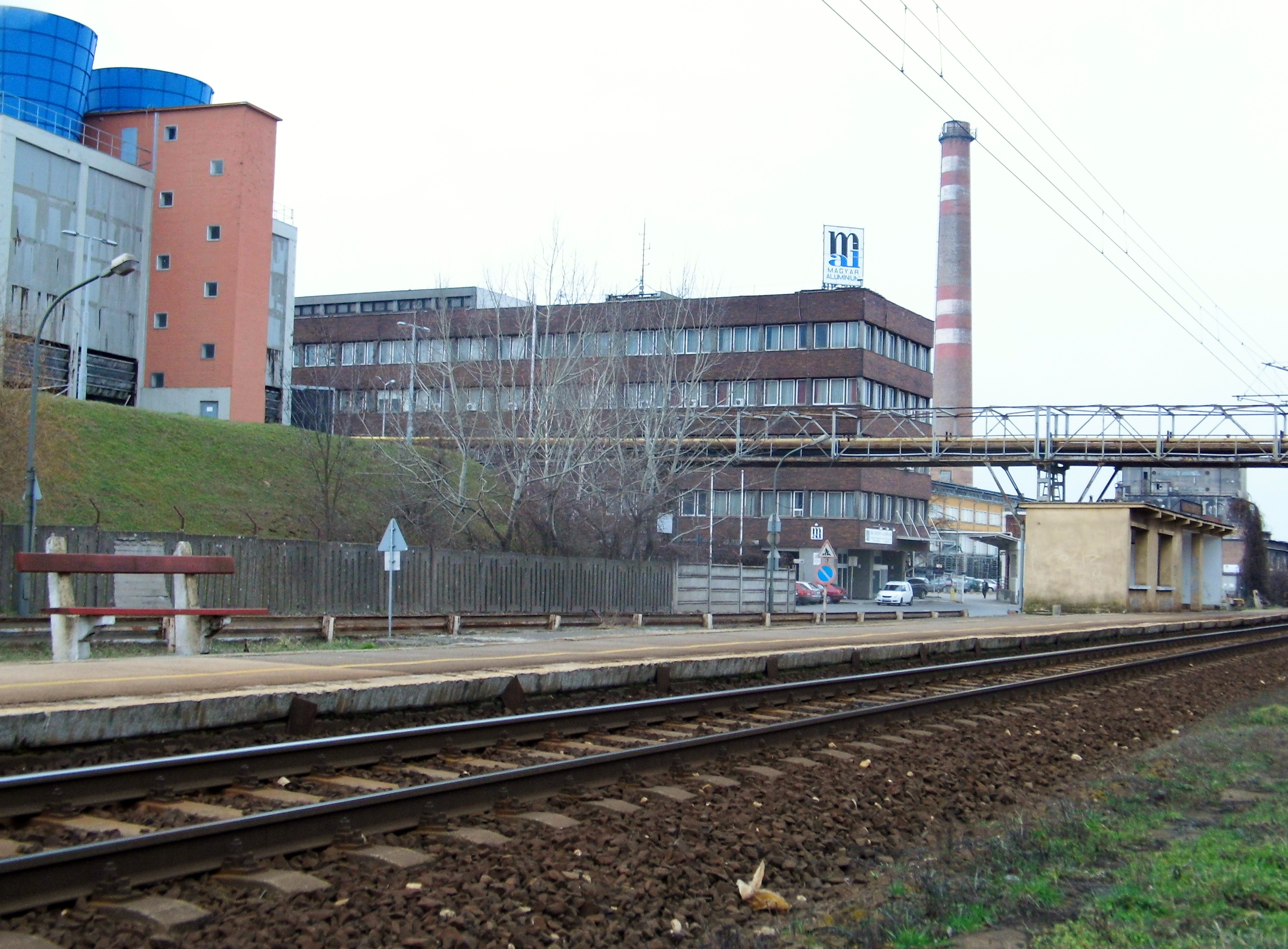

MAL Hungarian Aluminium (Hungarian: MAL Magyar Alumínium Termelő és Kereskedelmi Zrt.) was a Hungarian company that was specializing in the production of aluminium and related products. It was established in 1995 during the privatization of the Hungarian aluminium industry.

MAL's initial assets were the Bakony bauxite mine, an alumina factory in Ajka and an aluminium smelter in Inota (municipality of Várpalota), all of them in Veszprém County northwestern Hungary. The company set up subsidiaries in Germany and Romania, and acquired majority holdings in the SILKEM, producing zeolites and ground alumina in Kidričevo, Slovenia, and Rudnici Boksita Jajce, which operates a high-grade bauxite mine near Jajce, central Bosnia. The smelting facilities at Inota were converted into a recycling operation in 2006, and sold off as INOTAL Aluminium Processing Zrt. in 2007.

On 4 October 2010, a retaining dam failed on one of the red mud ponds at the company's Ajka alumina factory, spilling 600,000–700,000 cubic metres of highly alkaline and corrosive (caustic) red mud arising as a residual product from the treatment of bauxite with sodium hydroxide. At least ten people died, and about 150 people were injured, in the nearby settlements of Kolontár and Devecser.

On 13 October 2010, the government nationalized the company. The bill that made this possible had been passed by the Parliament one day earlier.

In 2013 the company underwent liquidation. The production facilities were all sold to IC Profil Ltd. in 2015, so no production was undertaken by the company after that time. However, the company still owned the sludge storage facility (not in active use anymore due to the recent change in technology), and various buildings in its Ajka site. The company has completed the liquidation process in the late 2010s (exact year unknown), and in 2020 some of the activities of the successor companies moved from the Ajka site. The main successor company, Silkem Hungary employed around 150 people in 2026, and most of them worked in Ajka, producing calcined alumina -non metallurgical- and processed hydrates. (This is compared to several thousand employees at its peak in the late 1990s.)

== See also ==
- Ajka alumina plant accident
