= Holding pond =

A holding pond can refer to:

- a detention basin adjacent to rivers to temporarily store water as a protection against flooding
- a pond created to store waste material, such as red mud

See also:

- Retention basin, used to manage stormwater runoff to prevent flooding and downstream erosion, and improve water quality
- Settling basin – for treating agricultural & industrial wastewater
