= Wallabout Historic District =

Historic district in Brooklyn, New York

- U.S. National Register of Historic Places
- U.S. Historic district
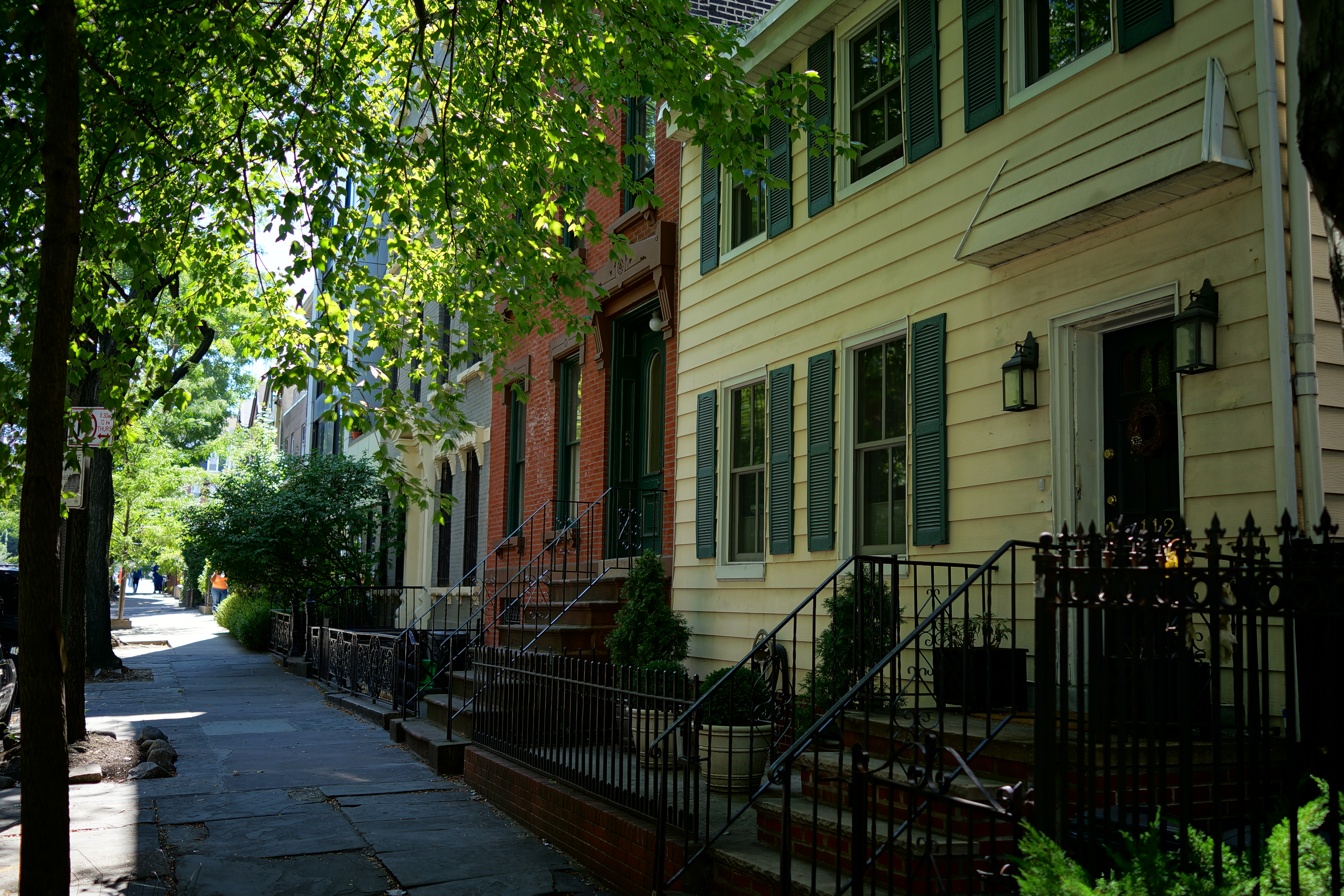
- Vanderbilt Avenue, Wallabout Historic District, September 2013

- Location within New York City Location within New York Location within the United States
- Location: 73-83 & 123-141 Cleremont Ave.; 74-148 & 75-143 Clinton Ave.; 381-387, 403-421 & 455-461 Myrtle Ave.; 74-132 & 69-149 Vanderbilt Ave., Brooklyn, New York
- Coordinates: 40°41′40″N 73°58′12″W
- Area: 18.17 acres (7.35 ha)
- Built: c. 1830-1880
- Architect: Abrams, Valentine; Baldwin, Ezra; Brown, James; et al.
- Architectural style: Greek Revival, Gothic Revival, Italianate, Second Empire, Queen Anne, Beaux-Arts, Colonial Revival
- NRHP reference No.: 11000229
- Added to NRHP: April 27, 2011

Wallabout Historic District is a national historic district located in the Wallabout neighborhood of Brooklyn, Kings County, New York. The district encompasses 203 contributing buildings in a mixed residential and commercial / industrial section of Brooklyn. The district features noteworthy examples of Greek Revival, Gothic Revival, Italianate, Second Empire, Queen Anne, Beaux-Arts, and Colonial Revival style architecture. It largely developed between about 1830 and 1880, with some later development. It includes vernacular wood houses, masonry single-family rowhouses in brick and brownstone, and multi-family tenements and flat houses.

It was listed on the National Register of Historic Places in 2011.
