= List of non-water floods =

Most non-water floods (excluding mudflows, oil spills, or volcanic lahars) involve storage facilities suddenly releasing liquids, or industrial retaining reservoirs releasing toxic waste. Storage facility incidents usually cover a small area but can be catastrophic in cities. For example, a molasses tank failure in 1919 led to the Great Molasses Flood that killed 21 people in Boston, Massachusetts, U.S.

Industrial retaining reservoirs are often used to store toxic waste, and when they fail they can flood a large area, causing physical and environmental damage. The 2010 failure of a reservoir at the Ajka alumina plant in Hungary flooded a small town and killed several, while the cleanup from the 2008 Kingston Fossil Plant spill in Tennessee, United States, took several years and killed at least 40 workers involved.

== List ==
List of non-water floods
Name	Date	Volume (litres)	Composition	Location
London Beer Flood	17 October 1814	580–1,470 thousand	Beer	London, England
Dublin whiskey fire	18 June 1875	?	Whiskey	Dublin, Ireland
Great Molasses Flood	15 January 1919	8.7 million	Molasses	Boston, Massachusetts, U.S.
Rockwood & Company shipping department fire	12 May 1919	?	Molten chocolate and butter	New York City, U.S.
Aberfan disaster	21 October 1966	110 million	Mine spoil and water	Aberfan, Wales, UK
Church Rock uranium mill spill	16 July 1979	350 million	Uranium tailings	Church Rock, New Mexico, U.S.
Wisconsin butter flood	3 May 1991	?	Butter, cheese, and processed meat	Madison, Wisconsin, U.S.
Doñana disaster	25 April 1998	4–5 billion	Mine tailings	Aznalcóllar, Andalusia, Spain
2000 Baia Mare cyanide spill	30 January 2000	100 million	Mine tailings with cyanide	Baia Mare, Romania
Kingston Fossil Plant coal fly ash slurry spill	22 December 2008	4.2 billion	Coal byproducts mixed with water	Kingston, Tennessee, U.S.
Ajka alumina plant accident	4 October 2010	1 billion	Bauxite residue mixed with water (caustic sludge, red in color)	Ajka, Hungary
Mount Polley Mine	4 August 2014	25 billion	Mine tailings - nickel, arsenic, copper, lead and compounds thereof	near Likely, British Columbia
Mariana dam disaster	5 November 2015	43 billion	Tailings mixed with water	Mariana, Brazil
Pepsi fruit juice flood	25 April 2017	14 million	Fruit and vegetable juices	Lebedyan, Russia
Levira Distiller wine flood	10 September 2023	2 million	Red wine	São Lourenço do Bairro, Portugal

== See also ==
- List of floods
