= Pepsi fruit juice flood =

Flood of juice in Russia

- Date: April 25, 2017
- Location: Lebedyan, Russia and the Don River; 53.01203°N 39.15004°E
- Cause: Pepsi warehouse collapse

The Pepsi fruit juice flood was a flood of 94,000 barrels (14 million litres; 14,000 cubic meters; 3.4 million US gallons) of fruit and vegetable juices into the streets of Lebedyan, Russia, and the Don River, caused by the collapse of a PepsiCo warehouse.

== History ==
On April 25, 2017, a PepsiCo warehouse's roof collapsed unexpectedly. The warehouse was located in Lebedyan, the centre of Pepsi's operations in Russia, and operated by the PepsiCo subsidiary Lebedyansky. The warehouse contained a variety of fruit and vegetable juices. The collapse of the roof caused two minor injuries and sent 28,000,000 litres (7,400,000 US gal) of juices into the streets of Lebedyan and the Don River. However, no deaths resulted from the spill.

There was some concern that the juices might have damaged the aquatic ecosystem of the Don River, but water samples showed no evidence of environmental damage caused by the spill.

PepsiCo officials apologised for the incident, offered to pay for all damages caused, and stated that they were working with local officials to determine the cause of the warehouse collapse.

== See also ==
- List of non-water floods
