= Wisconsin butter fire =

Fire and flood of dairy in 1991

Wisconsin Butter Fire
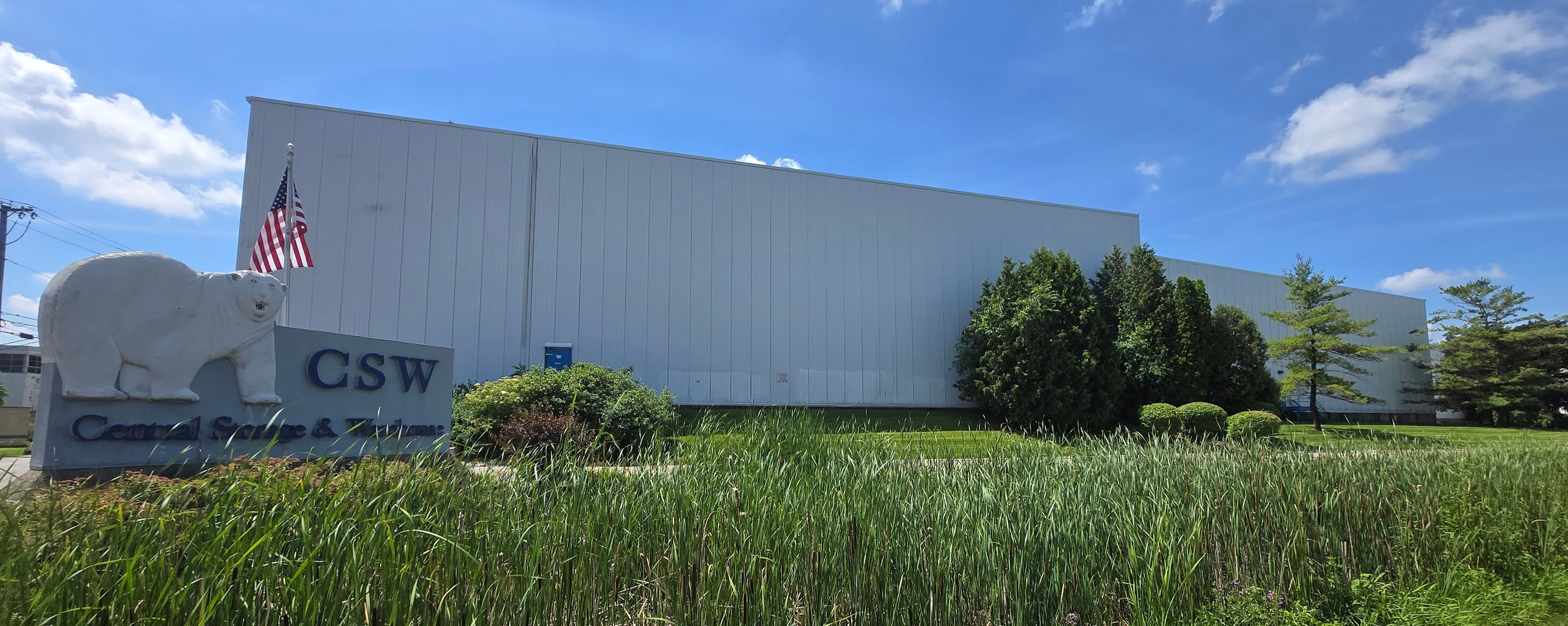
- The rebuilt CSW warehouse in 2026
- Date: May 3, 1991; 35 years ago
- Time: Approximately 3:30 pm
- Location: Madison, Wisconsin, U.S.; 43°05′00″N 89°18′33″W
- Cause: Accidental fire
- Deaths: None

The Wisconsin butter fire, also known as the butter flood, great cheese fire, and great butter fire, was a fire and flood of processed meat and dairy that began on May 3, 1991, at a large storage facility in Madison, Wisconsin. The fire continued for eight days; there were no fatalities, but it caused millions of dollars in damages. The incident is known as the biggest commercial fire in Wisconsin state history and the Madison Fire Department's biggest and most expensive challenge.

== Background ==
The fire occurred as America's butter surplus was near its peak, when the US government purchased excess quantities of surplus cheese and butter in efforts to keep prices stable. Due to the overzealous government purchasing, farmers increased production of milk and butterfat by 30 percent between 1974 and 1990 even though consumer demand was not increasing. A Wisconsin State Journal article titled "The butter cup runneth over" from April 1990 reported that 330 million pounds (150,000 tonnes) of dairy products were sitting in warehouses.

== The fire and the flood ==
=== First flames ===
On May 3, 1991, flames broke out in the late afternoon at the Central Storage and Warehouse Company on Cottage Grove Road, a 500,000-square-foot (46,000 m^{2}) complex that stored 10 to 15 million pounds (4,500 to 6,800 tonnes) of government surplus butter. At the time of the fire, the building also stored Ocean Spray cranberries and "millions and millions of hot dogs", according to an employee. Oscar Mayer stored 4 million pounds (1,800 tonnes) of sausages in the facility. Building owner Ken Williams stated that the fire grew so quickly that "the sprinkler systems were not able to even work." According to a Wisconsin Department of Natural Resources report, the damages included bakery products, hams, and 1,000 pounds (450 kg) of anhydrous ammonia. It took about twenty hours to contain the blaze, and eight days until the fire was officially out.

A firefighter reported flames 300 feet (91 m) high. There were about twenty-five employees present at the factory, and none were injured.

Due to the thick, fatty pool of dairy, ladder trucks could not effectively enter and leave the area, nor could fuel trucks enter to refill the ladder trucks' gas tanks. Instead, mechanics traveled through the butter river on foot with five-US-gallon (19 L; 4.2 imp gal) buckets of diesel fuel. Spraying water at the building caused more gooey melted cheese and butter to flow out. Nearly 3,000 nearby Madison residents were evacuated on Friday night and moved to a high school because firefighters thought the flames might spread. The neighbors reported a horrible stench.

=== Butter flood ===
After about two and a half hours, the fire spread to a second factory building. Five hours later the building collapsed, creating a massive wave of melted butter. The fire threatened the facility's anhydrous ammonia tanks. "Once the walls caved in, [the butter] came out like a river", said fire lieutenant Berggren. City Engineering crews constructed levees to contain the dairy and lard.

Firefighters had to wade through viscous, slippery pools of butter and cheese that were two to three feet (60 to 90 cm) high with five-foot (1.5 m) deep ponds in some places. The melted dairy made it difficult to use typical equipment, so firefighters remained outside the building, trudging upstream through a hot flow. Firefighter Steven Davis reported having "butter in places a guy shouldn't have butter by the end of that night."

== Cleanup and legacy ==
The Environmental Protection Agency states that butter spills have similar effects on wildlife to petroleum-based oil spills. The Wisconsin Department of Natural Resources worked to prevent the river of butter and cheese from clogging tubes and polluting local bodies of water. To contain the sludgy runoff of dairy, it constructed multiple dams to protect Starkweather Creek, which feeds into Lake Monona. City employees of Madison steered the butter river into a storm water discharge pond near the highway, but when the pond overflowed, some of its contents were pumped across the railroad tracks into another pond. The fire and subsequent dairy flood caused major financial losses, including $7.5 million in property damages ($17.7 million in 2025), $70 million in contents ($165 million in 2025), and nearly $1 million ($2.36 million in 2025) in fire control costs. The cleanup cost approximately $550,000 ($1.3 million in 2025), and was mostly paid by the Central Storage and Warehouse Company and a grant from the USDA.

On May 7, 1991, arson investigators ruled the fire to be an accident that originated near a battery-propelled forklift. An informal year-end survey by The Capital Times named the Butter Fire the most important local news story of 1991. In October 2011, more than twenty years after the flames, the Central Storage and Warehouse company finished reconstruction along with a 42,000-square-foot (3,900 m^{2}) freezer.

== See also ==
- List of non-water floods
