= Waste pond =

Small body of water used for pollutant disposal

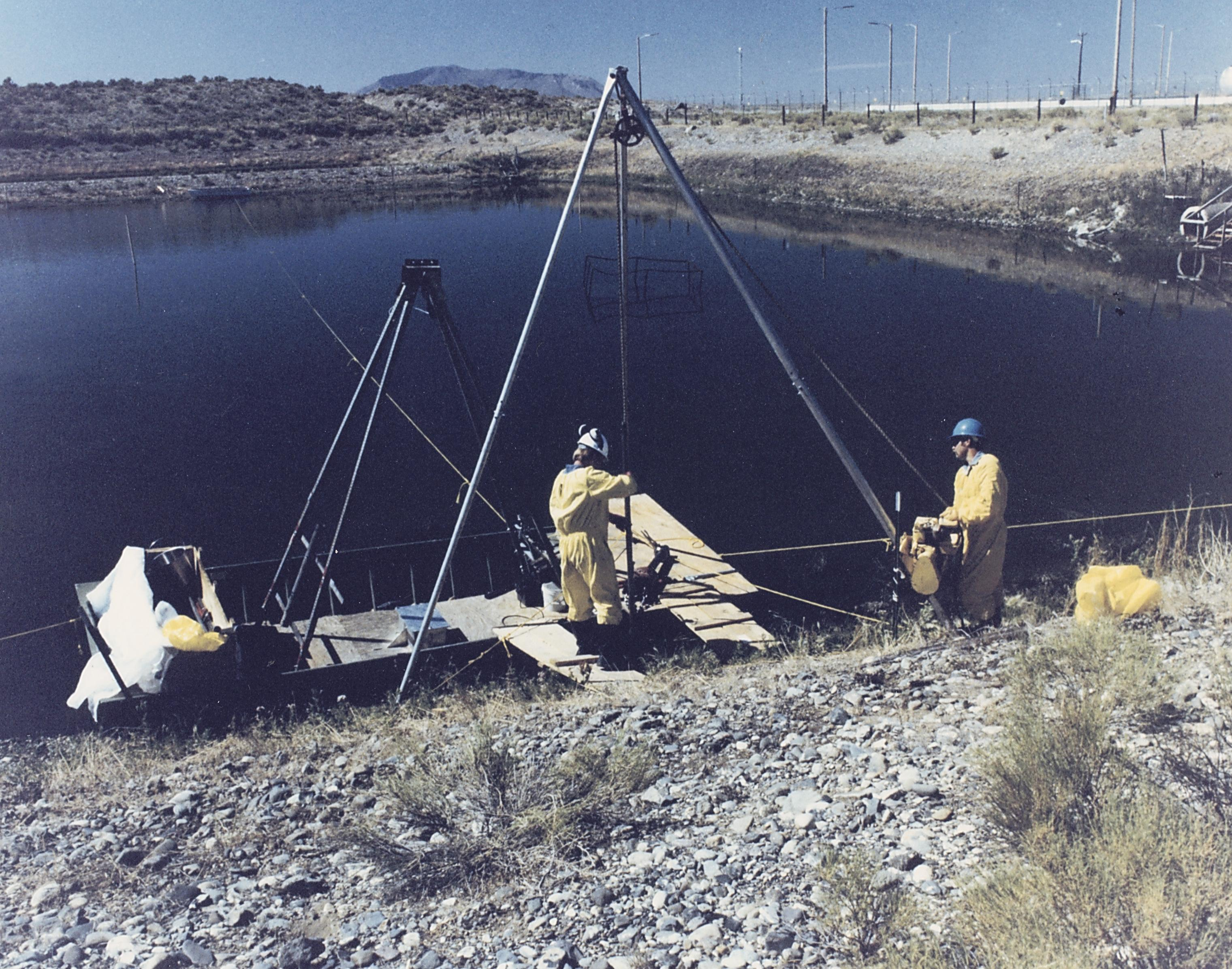
Low-level radioactive waste leach pond for the Idaho National Laboratory test reactor

A waste pond or chemical pond is a small impounded water body used for the disposal of water pollutants, and sometimes utilized as a method of recycling or decomposing toxic substances. Such waste ponds may be used for regular disposal of pollutant materials or may be used as upset receivers for special pollution events. Often, chemical ponds themselves are addressed for cleanup action after their useful life is over or when a risk of groundwater contamination arises. Contamination of waterways and groundwater can be damaging to human, animal and environmental health. These health effects bring into question the best engineering solutions to mitigate waste ponds' environmental impact.

== Environmental and health risks ==
The bacteria, pathogens, and excess nutrients stored in waste ponds can damage the environment and harm human health. In storms and heavy rainfall, waste ponds can overflow spilling sewage water and contaminating waterways. The contamination of surrounding watersheds causes negative impacts to both the ecosystems and surrounding populations. A survey carried out in Eastern North Carolina found that there was a twenty-one percent increase in cases of acute gastrointestinal illness in rural areas surrounding hog farms which stored waste in waste ponds compared to areas without. The results also showed a stronger association following periods of heavy rain.

== History ==
Peak usage of waste ponds in the United States occurred in the period 1955 to 1985, after which the environmental risks of pond technology were sufficiently understood, such that alternative technologies for waste disposal gradually began to displace many of the waste ponds. Waste ponds often have pond liners, such as concrete or robust synthetic polymeric materials, to prevent infiltration of chemicals to soil or groundwater.

== Engineering ==
Designing and managing waste ponds in an environmentally responsible way requires a comprehensive approach that integrates site selection, chemical balancing, and the establishment of long-term sustainability practices. By employing effective chemical treatments, and monitoring systems, it is possible to significantly reduce the environmental impact of waste ponds. Additionally, using strategies such as waste minimization, pond closure, and the use of containment systems ensure that these ponds can serve as a safe and effective solution for waste management without putting the health of surrounding ecosystems at risk.

== Waste ponds in practice ==
=== United States ===
==== Piscataway chemical pond ====
Union Carbide used the pond at its Piscataway, New Jersey plant while in operation. The pond's primary use was chemical drainage. Hazardous chemicals would flow through drains inside the plant and into the pond. They were later pumped back to the factory via two large pumps, distilled to remove acetone and other hazards. Overall, this process was harmful to the environment and polluted the groundwater.

==== Oak Ridge waste pond ====
The United States Oak Ridge National Laboratory in Oak Ridge, Tennessee operated for more than 50 years, and was decommissioned in the mid 1960s. Plant waste, collected in a pond, was found to contain radioactive waste, including strontium-90, caesium-137; tritium, and transuranics.

In the mid 1990s, Department of Energy officials installed a cryogenic stabilization system at the waste pond, freezing the soil and groundwater, forming a barrier to groundwater leaching. In February 2004, the cryogenic system was dismantled, and the pond was excavated. The soil surrounding the frozen pond contained lower levels of contamination than the pond itself, but enough contamination that it had to be removed. This demonstrates the lasting environmental impact of waste disposal in waste ponds.

=== Kenya ===
While there are many wastewater treatment options available, some are more accessible or effective in different parts of the world. In Kenya, waste stabilization ponds are one of the most effective wastewater treatment methods, and one of the few that work in Kenya, specifically.

=== Europe ===
Across Europe, waste ponds are a common method of wastewater treatment. In France there are an estimated 2,500 waste ponds. There are approximately 1,500 in Bavaria and approximately 3,000 in Germany, overall. The United Kingdom has only recorded the existence of 40 waste ponds, but this may be due to the limited research has been done on the UK's waste ponds.

== See also ==
- Evaporation pond
