= Olivier Dubuquoy =

Geographer

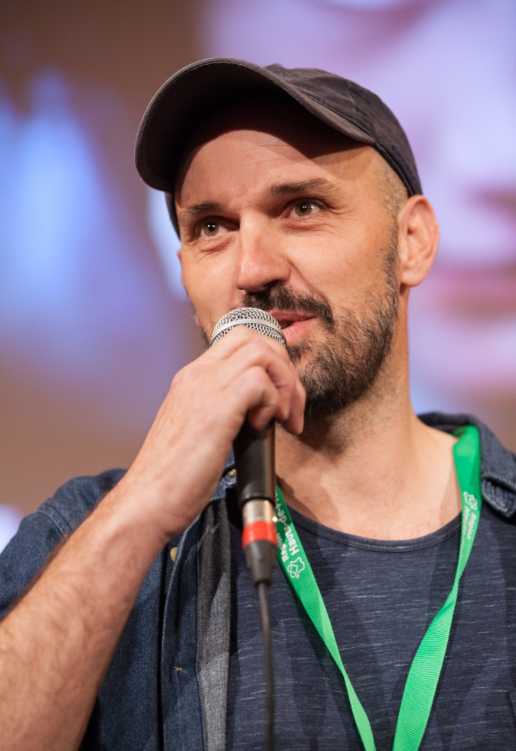
Olivier Dubuquoy.

Olivier Dubuquoy (born 1974) is an academic and author. Known for his commitment against the pollution of the Mediterranean by red sludge and his fighting for an end to our dependency on fossil fuels responsible for global warming.

== University ==
Olivier Dubuquoy obtained a Doctorate in Geography. He subsequently assumed the role of lecturer and researcher at Aix-Marseille University.

In 2008-2009 he participated in a scientific expedition entitled La Planète Revisitée, a collaborative initiative organized by the Muséum national d'histoire naturelle in Paris and the Institut de recherche pour le développement (IRD). The expedition aimed to document threatened species within biodiversity hotspots in Mozambique and Madagascar.

In 2009 he was selected for an artistic residency as part of the photographic project Salvador/Hambourg/Marseille: passé et présent de la mondialisation, which was jointly organized by the Goethe-Institut and Alliance française.

In 2013, he is taking up a research position in the field of storytelling, cultural and creative industries and on cultural and scientific mediation at the University of Toulon.

Between 2016 and 2019, he served as a member of the Centre Norbert Elias, an interdisciplinary research center.

Since 2022 he has been an associate researcher at the Civil Societies, Urban and Territorial Transitions in the Mediterranean Chair.https://www.chaire-mediterranee-transitions.fr/

== Commitments ==
Olivier Dubuquoy is committed to exposing the lobbying efforts and disinformation strategies employed within the alumina production sector, hazardous waste recycling industry, and the oil and gas sector.

He also raises concerns about the emerging colonization of the ocean and outer space.

=== Red mud ===
In 2011, researcher Olivier Dubuquoy revealed a confidential environmental impact assessment commissioned in 1993 by the now-defunct Pechiney conglomerate. The report acknowledged the high toxicity of the red sludge (red mud)—rich in heavy metals—generated by its alumina refinery in Gardanne, Bouches-du-Rhône, located in the Bouches-du-Rhône region.

He has been actively campaigning against the disposal of red mud from the Gardanne plant, whether through land dumping or marine discharge—a practice that has been ongoing since 1893. Among his initiatives, he launched a petition urging the French government to prohibit the release of red waste, which has gathered over 440,000 signatures.

In 2014 he arranged for scientific analyses to be carried out, highlighting the dangers to health posed by the Mange-Garri dumping site run by Alteo, successor to Pechiney, at Bouc-Bel-Air. There, red mud awaits recycling under the commercial name of "bauxaline".

That same year, he started filing lawsuits against Alteo with the help of Hélène Bras, a Montpellier barrister specializing in public law and environmental law and representing local fishermen and inhabitants working or living next to the site.

In 2016 with Laetitia Moreau, he co-directed a documentary – Zone rouge – histoire d’une désinformation toxique – dealing with the disinformation strategies and techniques developed by alumina industrialists to downplay their pollution.

In February 2019, red mud waste originating from the Alteo plant in Gardanne (Bouches-du-Rhône) was symbolically deposited outside the French Ministry of Ecology as a form of protest.

In 2022, the continuous discharge of red mud from the Gardanne plant will end, marking a significant environmental victory, Boues rouges : retour sur une victoire environnementale

=== Ending dependency on fossil fuels ===
In favor of climate and opposed to dependence on fossil fuels, Olivier Dubuquoy has fought against oil and gas exploration and exploitation licences with a view to reducing the impact of fossil fuels on global warming and preventing the extinction of living species.

While taking part in the action against the Rhône Maritime hydrocarbon exploration licence in 2012, he tackled another "hidden licence" presented as a project for scientific drilling in the Gulf of Lion, GOLD (for Gulf Of Lion’s Drilling). The drilling was to have been supported by five oil companies, intent on disguising commercial exploration under the cloak of scientific research. The permit was cancelled in 2012.

In 2013 and 2014, he led the actions for an alternative at the "Centre d’essais et d’expertise en mer profonde (Ceemp)", a global testing platform for accelerating the exploration and exploitation of hydrocarbons in deep water that was to have been erected off the île du Levant, right in the midst of the Pelagos Sanctuary for Mediterranean Marine Mammals. The project was cancelled by Ségolène Royal, the then ecology minister.

On October 17, 2015, at La Seyne-sur-Mer, Olivier Dubuquoy, co-founded the Nation Océan grassroots movement, based on the "Déclaration universelle de l'océan" (DUO) demanding for oceans to be considered a "common". The "Déclaration universelle de l'océan" was introduced to the European Parliament and the United Nations Organisation in 2017.

In her 2016 documentary Océan, naissance d’une nation ("Ocean, Birth of a Nation"), Aurine Crémieu narrates the birth of the movement by following in the steps of whistleblower Olivier Dubuquoy who warns politicians of the risks associated with the overexploitation of offshore exclusive economic zones. He stops at Brussels (to meet with José Bové), then at COP 21 (to meet with Ségolène Royal).

In 2016, Olivier Dubuquoy took part in the non-violent blockading of the Marine Construction and Engineering Deepwater Development (MCEDD) oil and gas summit at Pau, Pyrénées-Atlantiques, whose object was to accelerate the exploration and exploitation of hydrocarbons in deep water.

That same year, Olivier Dubuquoy tried to stop an Italian exploration licence for Zone E in the Mediterranean, off the coasts of Corsica and Sardinia, resulting in the permit being cancelled at the end of 2017.

== Documentaries ==
- Zone rouge – histoire d’une désinformation toxique
- Irréductibles Critique du film Irréductibles dans le Monde.

== Card game ==
Zone à débattre

== Comic books ==
- Nul(le) n'est à l'abri d'une victoire with Mdeuxpoints, Massot Editions, 2026
- Land with Philippe Squarzoni, Editions Delcourt Editis, 2026
