= Rockwood Chocolate Factory Historic District =

Historic district in Brooklyn, New York

- U.S. National Register of Historic Places
- U.S. Historic district
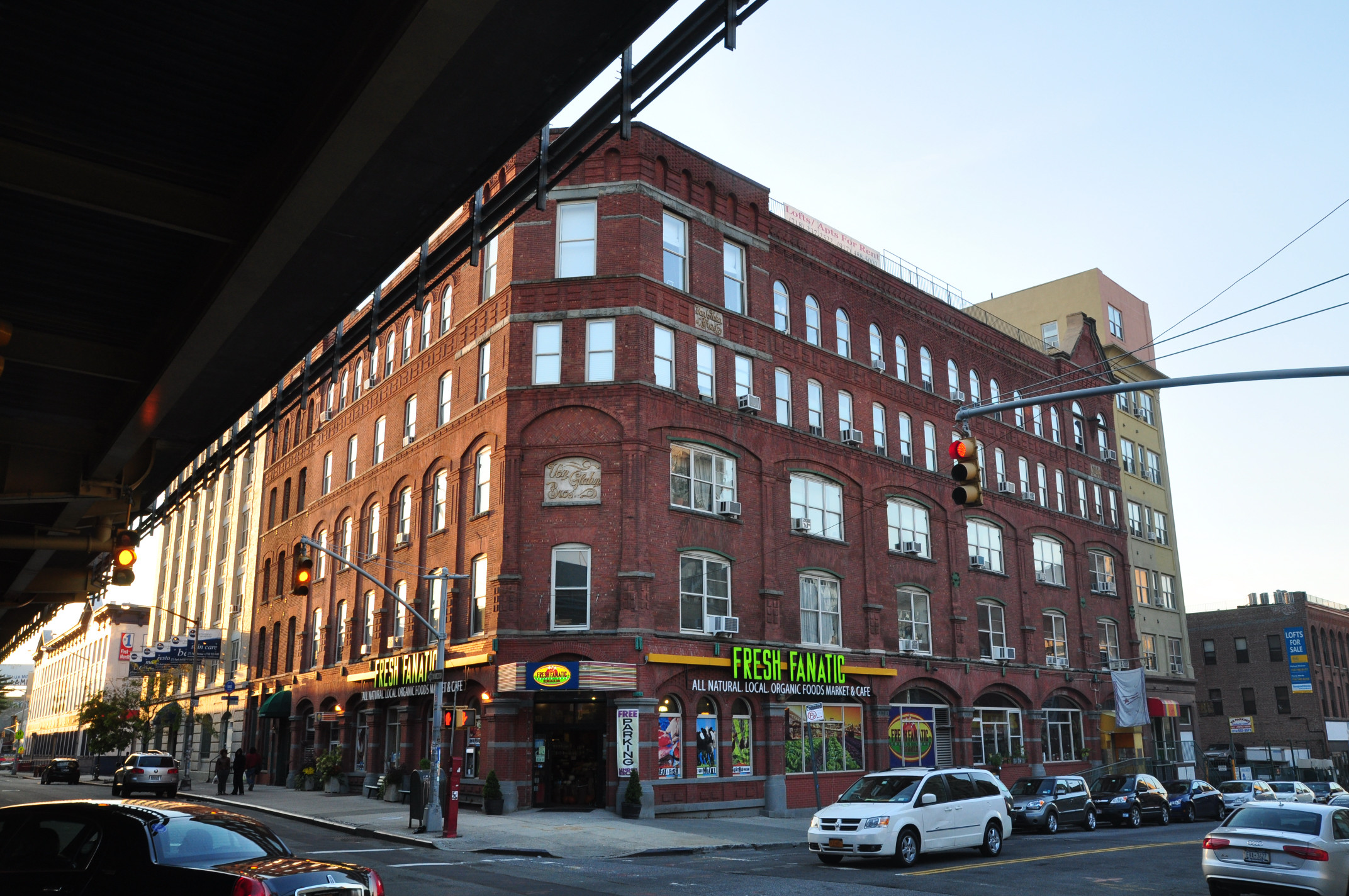
- Washington and Park - September 2012

- Location within New York City Location within New York Location within the United States
- Location: 54-88 Washington, 13-53 Waverly, and 255-275 Park Aves., Brooklyn, New York
- Coordinates: 40°41′47″N 73°58′6″W
- Area: 1.8 acres (0.73 ha)
- Built: 1891
- Architect: Multiple; Flagg, Ernest
- Architectural style: Late 19th And 20th Century Revivals, Romanesque, Second Renaissance Revival
- NRHP reference No.: 83003991
- Added to NRHP: October 6, 1983

Rockwood Chocolate Factory Historic District is a historic industrial complex and national historic district in Fort Greene, Brooklyn, New York City. The complex consists of 16 contributing buildings built between 1891 and 1928 and owned by Rockwood & Company until it went out of business in 1957. The largest and oldest building (Building 1 and 2) dates to 1891 and is located at the corner of Washington and Park avenues. It is a five-story, Romanesque Revival style building. Much of the complex has been converted to loft apartments.

It was listed on the National Register of Historic Places in 1983. It has been incorporated into the Wallabout Industrial Historic District.
