= Wallabout Industrial Historic District =

Historic district in Brooklyn, New York

- U.S. National Register of Historic Places
- U.S. Historic district
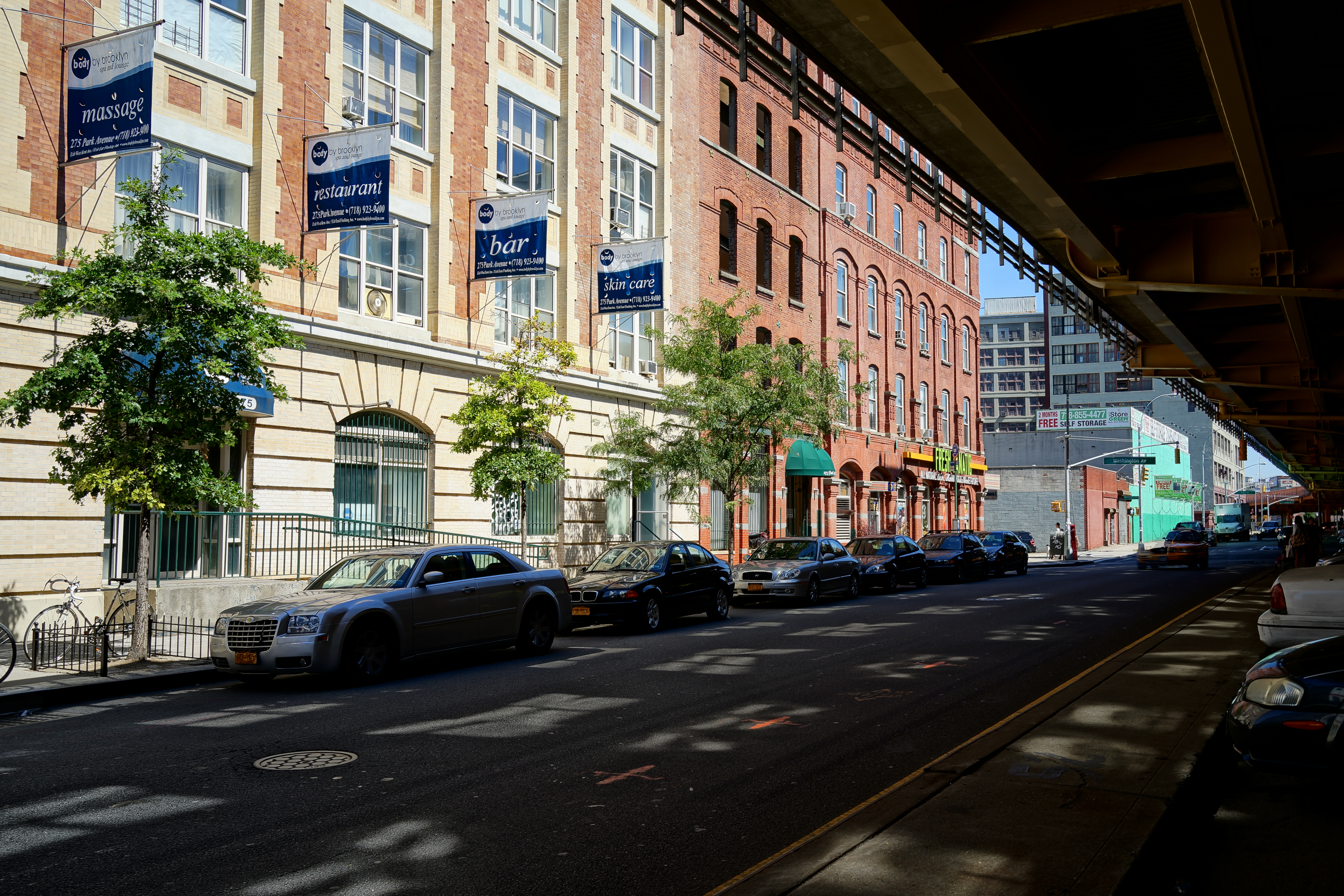
- Wallabout Industrial Historic District, September 2013

- Location within New York City Location within New York Location within the United States
- Location: Clinton, Flushing, Grand, Park, Washington, & Waverly Aves., Hall, & Ryerson Sts., Brooklyn, New York
- Coordinates: 40°41′49″N 73°58′01″W
- Area: 10.08 acres (4.08 ha)
- Built: c. 1890-1940
- Architectural style: Romanesque Revival
- NRHP reference No.: 12000479
- Added to NRHP: August 7, 2012

Wallabout Industrial Historic District is a national historic district located in the Wallabout neighborhood of Brooklyn, Kings County, New York. The district encompasses 43 contributing buildings and 3 contributing sites in an industrial section of Brooklyn. The district developed in the late-19th and early-20th century and features noteworthy examples of Romanesque Revival style architecture. The buildings are largely constructed of brick, bluestone, and brownstone with limestone, terra cotta, and cast iron elements. The district includes the Rockwood & Company chocolate factory complex previously listed as part of the Rockwood Chocolate Factory Historic District. A number of the buildings have been adapted for residential and commercial uses.

It was listed on the National Register of Historic Places in 2012.
