= Wallabout, Brooklyn =

Neighborhood in New York City

Coordinates: 40°41′37″N 73°58′10″W

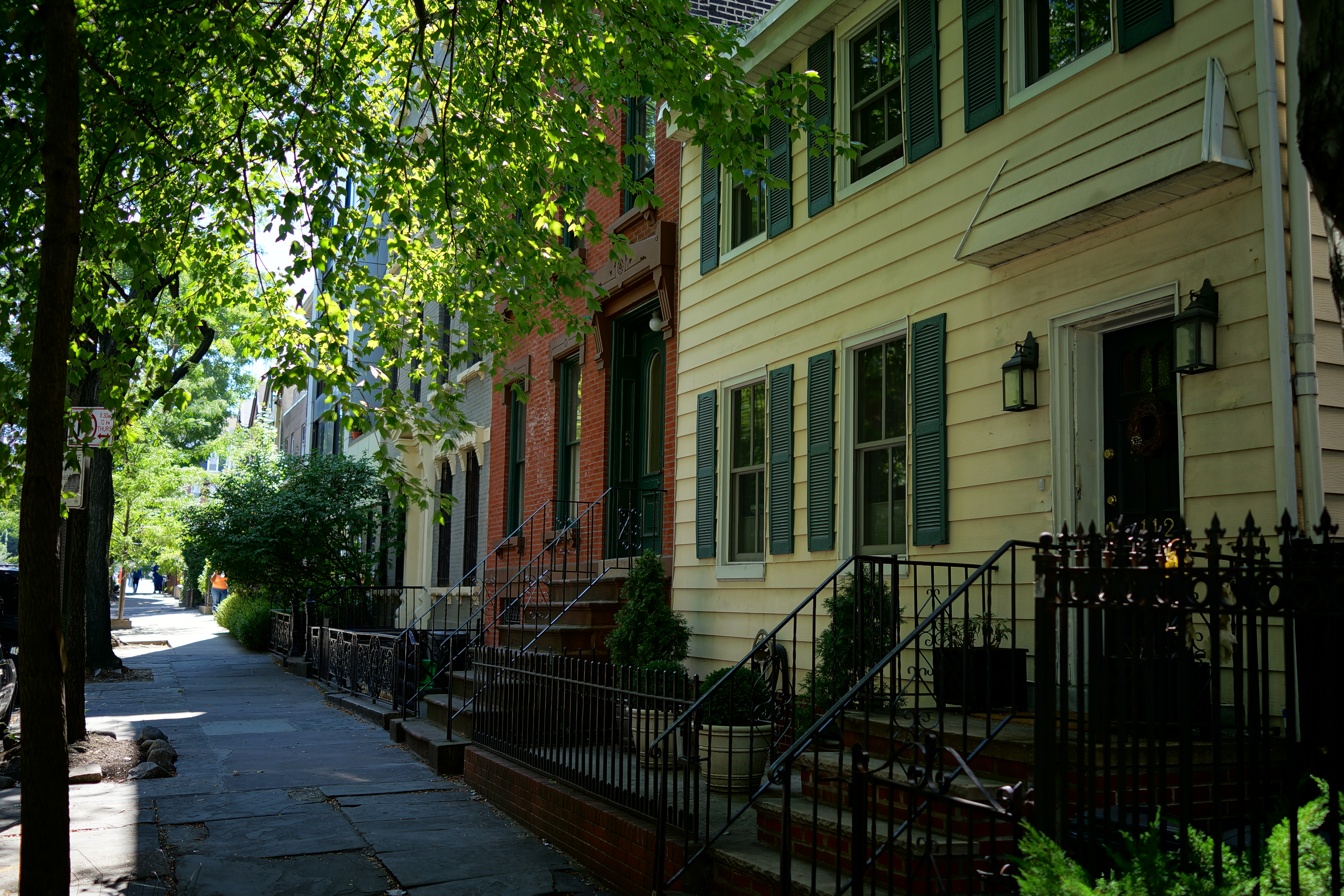
Historic row houses on Vanderbilt Avenue in Wallabout.

Wallabout is a neighborhood in the New York City borough of Brooklyn that dates back to the 17th century. It is one of the oldest areas of Brooklyn, in the area that was once Wallabout Bay but has largely been filled in and is now the Brooklyn Navy Yard.

The name Wallabout comes from the 17th century, when a group of Walloons, French-speaking Protestants from what is now Belgium, settled along the nearby bay. They called it “Waal-bogt,” or “bend in the harbor.”

It is a mixed use area with an array of old wood-frame buildings, public housing, brick townhouses and warehouses. It is bounded by Navy Street to the west, the Brooklyn Navy Yard and Flushing Avenue to the north, Myrtle Avenue to the south and Marcy Avenue to the east. In the early 1800s, however, Wallabout was just a village inside of the town of Brooklyn. The Brooklyn we know today was divided up into six towns: Brooklyn, Gravesend, Flatlands, Flatbush, New Utrect, and Bushwick. Wallabout was one of the villages in the town of Brooklyn, bordering other villages in Brooklyn, like Bedford and Gowanus. But over time as Brooklyn became more industrialized, the borders shrank, and Wallabout was fitted just outside the Brooklyn Navy Yard. The Lefferts-Laidlaw House was built about 1840 and added to the National Register of Historic Places in 1985. The Wallabout Historic District was added in 2011 and the Wallabout Industrial Historic District in 2012. Wallabout includes four public housing projects: The Marcy Houses, the Ingersoll Houses, the Walt Whitman Houses and the Farragut Houses. The neighborhood's name is rarely used anymore, being split into Fort Greene, Clinton Hill, and Bedford Stuyvesant. Wallabout was originally inhabited by the Brooklyn Navy Yard workers. Many of the historic row houses were built by the navy yard workers as well.

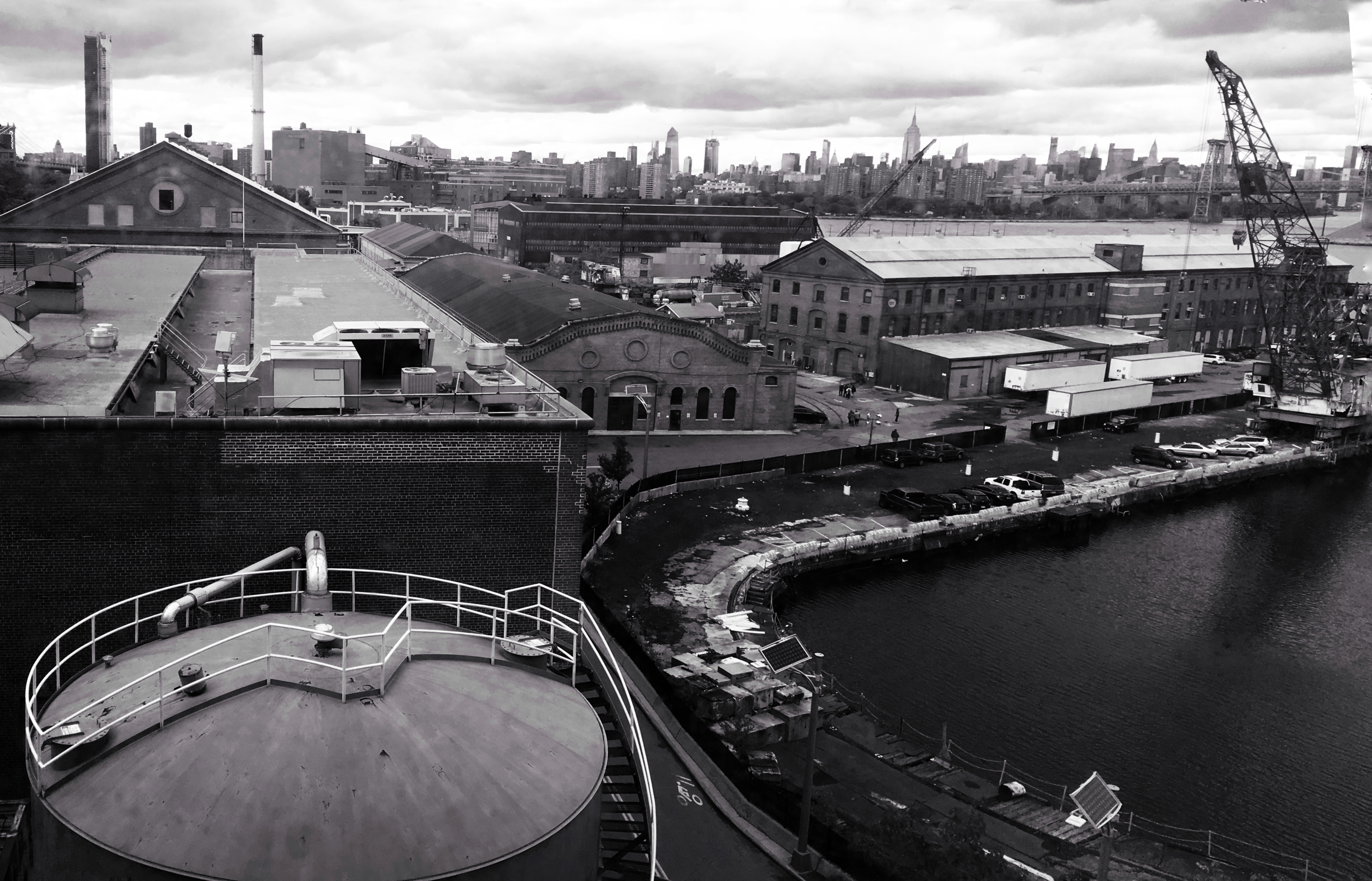
A modern-day shot of the Brooklyn Navy Yard, adjacent to Wallabout.

== See also ==
- Wallabout Market
