= Kolontár =

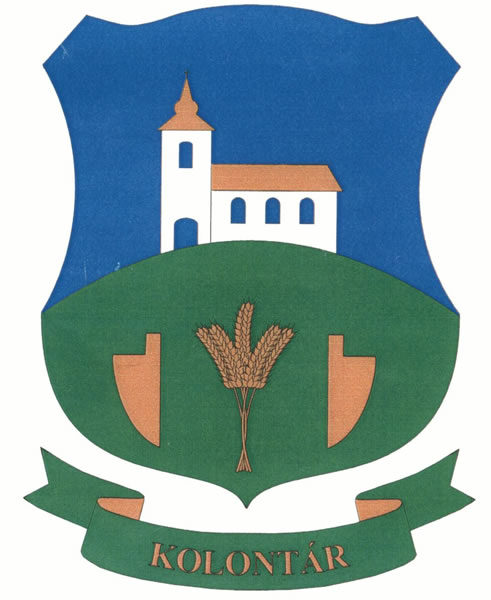
- Coat of arms

- Location of Veszprém county in Hungary

- Location of Kolontár
- Coordinates: 47.084435°N 17.475021°E
- Country: Hungary
- County: Veszprém

Area
  - Total: 21.72 km^{2} (8.39 sq mi)

Population (2004)
  - Total: 845
  - Density: 38.9/km^{2} (101/sq mi)
- Time zone: UTC+1 (CET)
  - Summer (DST): UTC+2 (CEST)
- Postal code: 8468
- Area code: 88

Kolontár (Hungarian: [ˈkolontaːr]) is a village in Veszprém county, Hungary.

== Soil pollution disaster ==
On 4 October 2010 a 1.5–4 meter high wave of red mud flooded the village from a plant nearby causing nine deaths and several severe chemical burn injuries. Six bodies were found in the mud and three other victims died later in a hospital after the incident. Hundreds of village inhabitants had to evacuate.
