= Red mud =

Waste product from the production of alumina

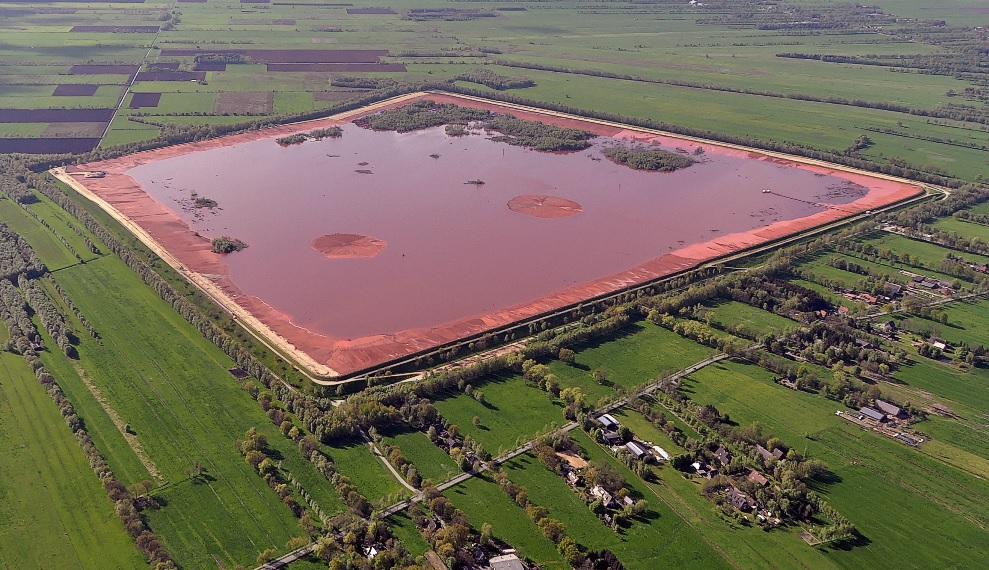
Red mud near Stade (Germany)

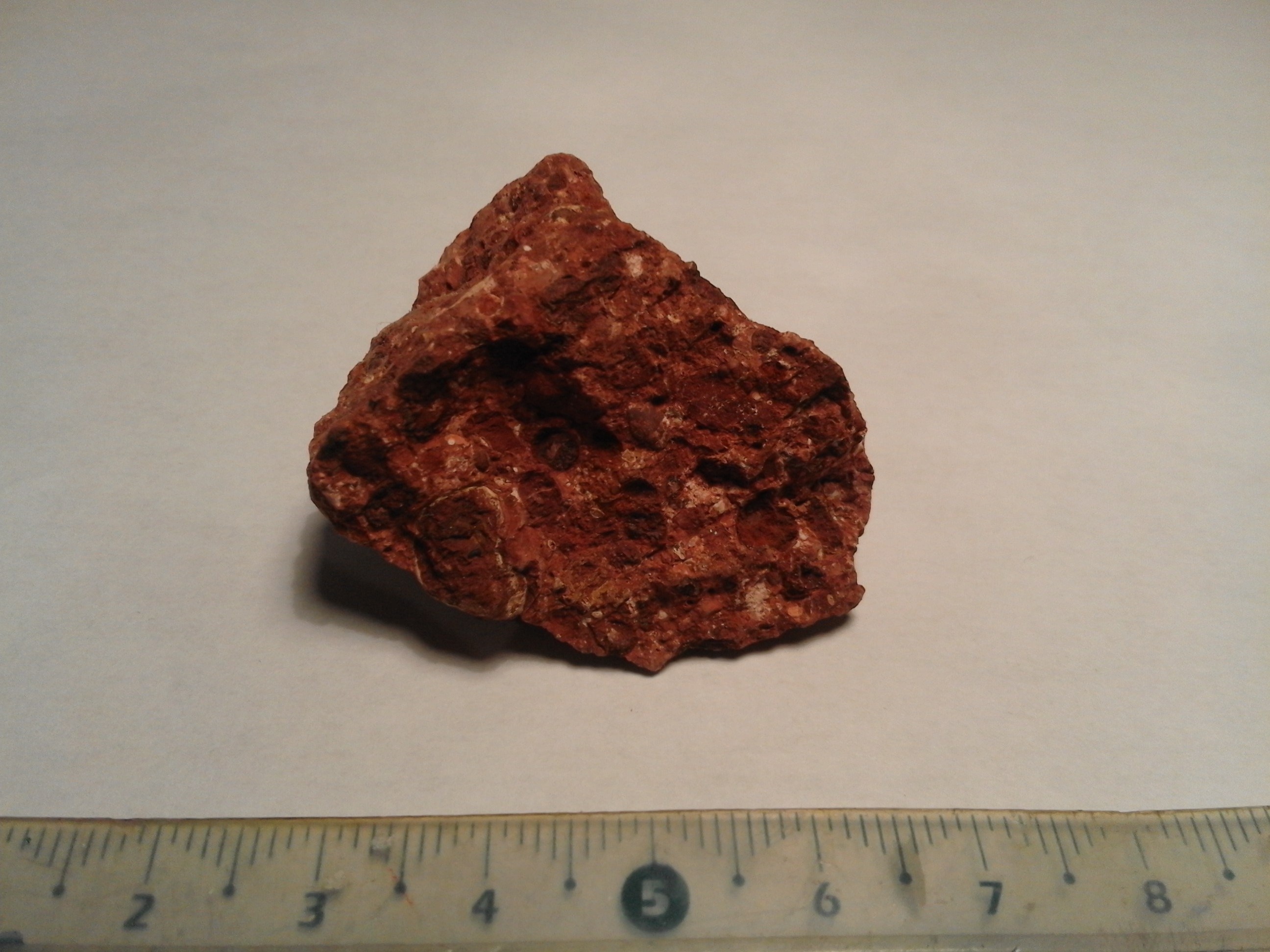
Bauxite, an aluminium ore (Hérault department, France). The reddish colour is due to iron oxides that make up the main part of the red mud.

Red mud, now more frequently termed bauxite residue, is an industrial waste generated during the processing of bauxite into alumina using the Bayer process. It is composed of various oxide compounds, including the iron oxides which give its red colour. Over 97% of the alumina produced globally is through the Bayer process; for every tonne (2,200 lb) of alumina produced, approximately 1 to 1.5 tonnes (2,200 to 3,300 lb) of red mud are also produced; the global average is 1.23. Annual production of alumina in 2023 was over 142 million tonnes (310 billion pounds) resulting in the generation of approximately 170 million tonnes (370 billion pounds) of red mud.

Due to this high level of production and the material's high alkalinity, if not stored properly, it can pose a significant environmental hazard. As a result, significant effort is being invested in finding better methods for safe storage and dealing with it such as waste valorization in order to create useful materials for cement and concrete.

Less commonly, this material is also known as bauxite tailings, red sludge, or alumina refinery residues. Increasingly, the name processed bauxite is being adopted, especially when used in cement applications.

== Production ==
Red mud is a side-product of the Bayer process, the principal means of refining bauxite en route to alumina. The resulting alumina is the raw material for producing aluminium by the Hall–Héroult process. A typical bauxite plant produces one to two times as much red mud as alumina. This ratio is dependent on the type of bauxite used in the refining process and the extraction conditions.

More than 60 manufacturing operations across the world use the Bayer process to make alumina from bauxite ore. Bauxite ore is mined, normally in open cast mines, and transferred to an alumina refinery for processing. The alumina is extracted using sodium hydroxide under conditions of high temperature and pressure. The insoluble part of the bauxite (the residue) is removed, giving rise to a solution of sodium aluminate, which is then seeded with an aluminium hydroxide crystal and allowed to cool which causes the remaining aluminium hydroxide to precipitate from the solution. Some of the aluminium hydroxide is used to seed the next batch, while the remainder is calcined (heated) at over 1,000 °C (1,830 °F) in rotary kilns or fluid flash calciners to produce aluminium oxide (alumina).

The alumina content of the bauxite used is normally between 42 and 50%, but ores with a wide range of alumina contents can be used. The aluminium compound may be present as gibbsite (Al(OH)_{3}), boehmite (γ-AlO(OH)) or diaspore (α-AlO(OH)). The residue invariably has a high concentration of iron oxide which gives the product a characteristic red colour. A small residual amount of the sodium hydroxide used in the process remains with the residue, causing the material to have a high pH/alkalinity, normally above 12. Various stages of solid/liquid separation processes recycle as much sodium hydroxide as possible from the residue back into the Bayer Process, in order to reduce production costs and make the process as efficient as possible. This also lowers the final alkalinity of the residue, making it easier and safer to handle and store.

== Composition ==
Red mud is composed of a mixture of solid and metallic oxides. The red colour arises from iron oxides, which can comprise up to 60% of the mass. The mud is highly basic with a pH ranging from 10 to 13. In addition to iron, the other dominant components include silica, unleached residual aluminium compounds, and titanium oxide.

The main constituents of the residue after the extraction of the aluminium component are insoluble metallic oxides. The percentage of these oxides produced by a particular alumina refinery will depend on the quality and nature of the bauxite ore and the extraction conditions. The table below shows the composition ranges for common chemical constituents, but the values vary widely:

Chemical	Percentage composition
Fe_{2}O_{3}	5–60%
Al_{2}O_{3}	5–30%
TiO_{2}	0–15%
CaO	2–14%
SiO_{2}	3–50%
Na_{2}O	1–10%

Mineralogically expressed the components present are:

Chemical name	Chemical formula	Percentage composition
Sodalite	3Na_{2}O⋅3Al_{2}O_{3}⋅6SiO_{2}⋅Na_{2}SO_{4}	4–40%
Cancrinite	Na_{3}⋅CaAl_{3}⋅Si_{3}⋅O_{12}CO_{3}	0–20%
Aluminous-goethite (aluminous iron oxide)	α-(Fe,Al)OOH	10–30%
Hematite (iron oxide)	Fe_{2}O_{3}	10–30%
Silica (crystalline & amorphous)	SiO_{2}	5–20%
Tricalcium aluminate	3CaO⋅Al_{2}O_{3}⋅6H_{2}O	2–20%
Boehmite	AlO(OH)	0–20%
Titanium dioxide	TiO_{2}	0–10%
Perovskite	CaTiO_{3}	0–15%
Muscovite	K_{2}O⋅3Al_{2}O_{3}⋅6SiO_{2}⋅2H_{2}O	0–15%
Calcium carbonate	CaCO_{3}	2–10%
Gibbsite	Al(OH)_{3}	0–5%
Kaolinite	Al_{2}O_{3}⋅2SiO_{2}⋅2H_{2}O	0–5%

In general, the composition of the residue reflects that of the non-aluminium components, with the exception of part of the silicon component: crystalline silica (quartz) will not react but some of the silica present, often termed, reactive silica, will react under the extraction conditions and form sodium aluminium silicate as well as other related compounds.

=== Environmental hazards ===
Discharge of red mud can be hazardous environmentally because of its alkalinity and species components.

Until 1972, Italian company Montedison was discharging red mud off the coast of Corsica. The case is important in international law governing the Mediterranean sea.

In October 2010, approximately one million cubic metres (35 million cubic feet) of red mud slurry from an alumina plant near Kolontár in Hungary was accidentally released into the surrounding countryside, killing ten people and contaminating a large area. All life in the Marcal river was said to have been "extinguished" by the red mud, and within days the mud had reached the Danube. The long-term environmental effects of the spill have been minor after a €127 million remediation effort by the Hungarian government.

== Residue storage areas ==
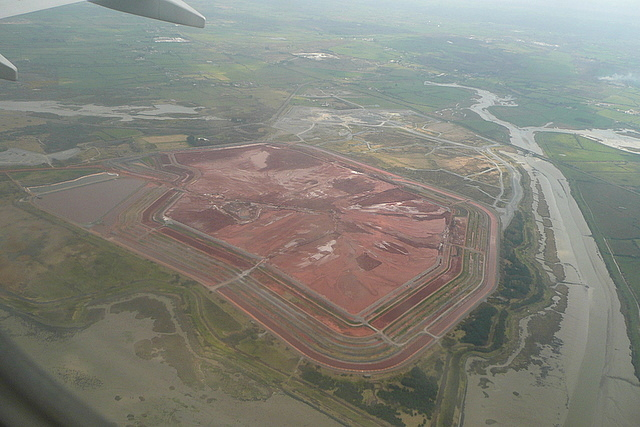
An aerial view of the bauxite residue waste disposal area in Ireland taken in 2010

Residue storage methods have changed substantially since the original plants were built. The practice in early years was to pump the slurry, at a concentration of about 20% solids, into lagoons or ponds sometimes created in former bauxite mines or depleted quarries. In other cases, impoundments were constructed with dams or levees, while for some operations valleys were dammed and the residue deposited in these holding areas.

It was once common practice for the red mud to be discharged into rivers, estuaries, or the sea via pipelines or barges; in other instances the residue was shipped out to sea and disposed of in deep ocean trenches many kilometres offshore. From 2016, all disposal into the sea, estuaries and rivers was stopped.

As residue storage space ran out and concern increased over wet storage, since the mid-1980s dry stacking has been increasingly adopted. In this method, residues are thickened to a high density slurry (48–55% solids or higher), and then deposited in a way that it consolidates and dries.

An increasingly popular treatment process is filtration whereby a filter cake (typically resulting in 23–27% moisture) is produced. This cake can be washed with either water or steam to reduce alkalinity before being transported and stored as a semi-dried material. Residue produced in this form is ideal for reuse as it has lower alkalinity, is cheaper to transport, and is easier to handle and process. Another option for ensuring safe storage is to use amphirols to dewater the material once deposited and then 'conditioned' using farming equipment such as harrows to accelerate carbonation and thereby reduce the alkalinity. Bauxite residue produced after press filtration and conditioning as described above are classified as non-hazardous under the EU Waste Framework Directive.

In 2013 Vedanta Aluminium, Ltd. commissioned a red mud powder-producing unit at its Lanjigarh refinery in Odisha, India, describing it as the first of its kind in the alumina industry, tackling major environmental hazards.

== Use ==
Since the Bayer process was first adopted industrially in 1894, the value of the remaining oxides has been recognized. Attempts have been made to recover the principal components – especially the iron oxides. Since bauxite mining began, a large amount of research effort has been devoted to seeking uses for the residue. Many studies are now being financed by the European Union under the Horizon Europe programme. Several studies have been conducted to develop uses of red mud. An estimated 3 to 4 million tonnes (6.6 to 8.8 billion pounds) are used annually in the production of cement, road construction and as a source for iron. Potential applications include the production of low cost concrete, application to sandy soils to improve phosphorus cycling, amelioration of soil acidity, landfill capping and carbon sequestration.

Reviews describing the current use of bauxite residue in Portland cement clinker, supplementary cementitious materials/blended cements and special calcium aluminate cements (CAC) and calcium sulfo-aluminate (CSA) cements have been extensively researched and documented.

- Cement manufacture, use in concrete as a supplementary cementitious material. From 500,000 to 1,500,000 tonnes (1.1 to 3.3 billion pounds).
- Raw material recovery of specific components present in the residue: iron, titanium, steel and REE (rare-earth elements) production. From 400,000 to 1,500,000 tonnes;
- Landfill capping/roads/soil amelioration – 200,000 to 500,000 tonnes;
- Use as a component in building or construction materials (bricks, tiles, ceramics etc.) – 100,000 to 300,000 tonnes;
- Other (refractory, adsorbent, acid mine drainage (Virotec), catalyst etc.) – 100,000 tonnes.
- Use in building panels, bricks, foamed insulating bricks, tiles, gravel/railway ballast, calcium and silicon fertilizer, refuse tip capping/site restoration, lanthanides (rare earths) recovery, scandium recovery, gallium recovery, yttrium recovery, treatment of acid mine drainage, adsorbent of heavy metals, dyes, phosphates, fluoride, water treatment chemical, glass ceramics, ceramics, foamed glass, pigments, oil drilling or gas extraction, filler for PVC, wood substitute, geopolymers, catalysts, plasma spray coating of aluminium and copper, manufacture of aluminium titanate-mullite composites for high temperature resistant coatings, desulfurisation of flue gas, arsenic removal, chromium removal.

In 2015, a major initiative was launched in Europe with funds from the European Union to address the valorization of red mud. Some 15 PhD students were recruited as part the European Training Network (ETN) for Zero-Waste Valorisation of Bauxite Residue. The key focus will be the recovery of iron, aluminium, titanium and rare-earth elements (including scandium) while valorising the residue into building materials. A European Innovation Partnership has been formed to explore options for using by-products from the aluminium industry, BRAVO (Bauxite Residue and Aluminium Valorisation Operations). This sought to bring together industry with researchers and stakeholders to explore the best available technologies to recover critical raw materials but has not proceeded. Additionally, EU funding of approximately €11.5 million has been allocated to a four-year programme starting in May 2018 looking at uses of bauxite residue with other wastes, RemovAL. A particular focus of this project is the installation of pilot plants to evaluate some of the interesting technologies from previous laboratory studies. As part of the H2020 project RemovAl, it is planned to erect a house in the Aspra Spitia area of Greece that will be made entirely out of materials from bauxite residue.

Other EU funded projects that have involved bauxite residue and waste recovery have been ENEXAL (ENergy-EXergy of ALuminium industry) [2010–2014], EURARE (European Rare earth resources) [2013–2017] and three more recent projects are ENSUREAL (ENsuring SUstainable ALumina production) [2017–2021], SIDEREWIN (Sustainable Electro-winning of Iron) [2017–2022] and SCALE (SCandium – ALuminium in Europe) [2016–2020] a €7 million project to look at the recovery of scandium from bauxite residue.

In 2020, the International Aluminium Institute, launched a roadmap for maximising the use of bauxite residue in cement and concrete.

In November 2020, The ReActiv: Industrial Residue Activation for Sustainable Cement Production research project was launched, this is being funded by the EU. One of the world's largest cement companies, Holcim, in cooperation with 20 partners across 12 European countries, launched the ambitious 4-year ReActiv project (reactivproject.eu). The ReActiv project will create a novel sustainable symbiotic value chain, linking the by-product of the alumina production industry and the cement production industry. In ReActiv modification will be made to both the alumina production and the cement production side of the chain, in order to link them through the new ReActiv technologies. The latter will modify the properties of the industrial residue, transforming it into a reactive material (with pozzolanic or hydraulic activity) suitable for new, low CO_{2} footprint, cement products. In this manner ReActiv proposes a win-win scenario for both industrial sectors (reducing wastes and CO_{2} emissions respectively). An example is the co-calcination of bauxite residue with kaolinitic clays, which provides a robust solution for a wide range of bauxite residue and links well to the techno-economic situation in the contemporary alumina and cement sectors.

Fluorchemie GmbH have developed a new flame-retardant additive from bauxite residue, the product is termed MKRS (modified re-carbonised red mud) with the trademark ALFERROCK(R) and has potential applicability in a wide range of polymers (PCT WO2014/000014). One of its particular benefits is the ability to operate over a much broader temperature range, 220–350 °C (428–662 °F), than alternative zero halogen inorganic flame retardants such as aluminium hydroxide, boehmite or magnesium hydroxide. In addition to polymer systems where aluminium hydroxide or magnesium hydroxide can be used, it has also found to be effective in foamed polymers such as EPS and PUR foams at loadings up to 60%.

In a suitable compact solid form, with a density of approximately 3.93 grams per cubic centimetre (0.142 lb/cu in), ALFERROCK produced by the calcination of bauxite residues, has been found to be very effective as a thermal energy storage medium (WO2017/157664). The material can repeatedly be heated and cooled without deterioration and has a specific thermal capacity in the range of 0.6 – 0.8 kJ/(kg·K) at 20 °C (68 °F) and 0.9 – 1.3 kJ/(kg·K) at 726 °C (1,339 °F); this enables the material to work effectively in energy storage device to maximise the benefits of solar power, wind turbines and hydro-electric systems. High strength geopolymers have been developed from red mud.

Sustainable Approach to Low-Grade Bauxite Processing

The IB2 process is a French technology developed to enhance the extraction of alumina from bauxite, especially low-grade bauxite. This method aims to boost alumina production efficiency while decreasing the environmental impacts typically linked with this process, notably the generation of red mud and carbon dioxide emissions.

The IB2 technology, patented in 2019, is the outcome of a decade of research and development efforts by Yves Occello, a former Pechiney chemist. This process improves the traditional Bayer process, which has been utilized for more than a century to extract alumina from bauxite. It presents a significant decrease in caustic soda consumption and a notable reduction in red mud output, thereby minimizing hazardous waste and environmental risks.

In addition to reducing red mud production, the IB2 process aids in lowering CO_{2} emissions, primarily through the optimized treatment of low-grade bauxite. By limiting the necessity to import high-grade bauxite, this process reduces the carbon footprint associated with ore transportation. Furthermore, the process yields a byproduct that can be utilized in the production of eco-friendly cements, promoting the concept of a circular economy.

The inventor of the technology is chemist Yves Occello, who founded the company IB2 with Romain Girbal in 2017.

== See also ==
- Chemical waste
- Olivier Dubuquoy
- Ajka alumina plant accident

== Sources ==
- Agrawal, A.; Sahu, K. K.; Pandey, B. D. (September 2004). "Solid waste management in non-ferrous industries in India". Resources, Conservation and Recycling. 42 (2): 99–120. Bibcode:2004RCR....42...99A. doi:10.1016/j.resconrec.2003.10.004.
- Babel, S.; Kurniawan, TA. (Feb 2003). "Low-cost adsorbents for heavy metals uptake from contaminated water: a review". J Hazard Mater. 97 (1–3): 219–43. Bibcode:2003JHzM...97..219B. doi:10.1016/S0304-3894(02)00263-7. PMID 12573840.
- Brunori, Claudia; Cremisini, Carlo; Massanisso, Paolo; Pinto, Valentina; Torricelli, Leonardo (2005). "Reuse of a treated red mud bauxite waste: studies on environmental compatibility". Journal of Hazardous Materials. 117 (1): 55–63. Bibcode:2005JHzM..117...55B. doi:10.1016/j.jhazmat.2004.09.010. PMID 15621353.
- Cooper M. B., "Naturally Occurring Radioactive Material (NORM) in Australian Industries", EnviroRad report ERS-006 prepared for the Australian Radiation Health and Safety Advisory Council (2005).
- Hyun, Jongyeong; Endoh, Shigehisa; Masuda, Kaoru; Shin, Heeyoung; Ohya, Hitoshi (2005). "Reduction of chlorine in bauxite residue by fine particle separation". Int. J. Miner. Process. 76 (1–2): 13–20. Bibcode:2005IJMP...76...13H. doi:10.1016/j.minpro.2004.08.022.
- Genç, Hülya; Tjell, Jens Christian; McConchie, David; Schuiling, Olaf (2003). "Adsorption of arsenate from water using neutralized red mud". J. Colloid Interface Sci. 264 (2): 327–334. Bibcode:2003JCIS..264..327G. doi:10.1016/S0021-9797(03)00447-8. PMID 16256648.
- Genç-Fuhrman, Hülya; Tjell, Jens Christian; McConchie, David (2004). "Increasing the arsenate adsorption capacity of neutralized red mud (Bauxsol™)". J. Colloid Interface Sci. 271 (2): 313–320. Bibcode:2004JCIS..271..313G. doi:10.1016/j.jcis.2003.10.011. PMID 14972607.
