= National Register of Historic Places listings in Brooklyn =

Location of Brooklyn in New York

The following properties are listed on the National Register of Historic Places in Brooklyn.

This is intended to be a complete list of properties and districts listed on the National Register of Historic Places in the New York City borough of Brooklyn, which coincides with Kings County, New York. The locations of National Register properties and districts (at least for all showing latitude and longitude coordinates below) may be seen in a map by clicking on "Map of all coordinates". (Note: The latitude and longitude information provided in this table was derived originally from the National Register Information System, which has been found to be fairly accurate for about 99% of listings. Some locations in this table may have been corrected to current GPS standards.)

This National Park Service list is complete through NPS recent listings posted November 6, 2026.

Contents: Counties in New York
Albany (Albany) – Allegany – Bronx – Broome – Cattaraugus – Cayuga – Chautauqua – Chemung – Chenango – Clinton – Columbia – Cortland – Delaware – Dutchess (Poughkeepsie, Rhinebeck) – Erie (Buffalo) – Essex – Franklin – Fulton – Genesee – Greene – Hamilton – Herkimer – Jefferson – Kings – Lewis – Livingston – Madison – Monroe (Rochester) – Montgomery – Nassau – New York (Below 14th Street, 14th to 59th Streets, 59th to 110th Streets, Above 110th Street, Islands) – Niagara (Niagara Falls) – Oneida – Onondaga (Syracuse) – Ontario – Orange – Orleans – Oswego – Otsego – Putnam – Queens – Rensselaer – Richmond – Rockland – St. Lawrence – Saratoga – Schenectady – Schoharie – Schuyler – Seneca – Steuben – Suffolk – Sullivan – Tioga – Tompkins – Ulster – Warren – Washington – Wayne – Westchester (Northern, Southern, New Rochelle, Peekskill, Yonkers) – Wyoming – Yates

== Current listings ==
| | Name on the Register | Image | Date listed | Location | Neighborhood | Description |
|---|---|---|---|---|---|---|
| 1 | 4th Avenue Station (IND) | 4th Avenue Station (IND) | July 6, 2005 (#05000673) | 4th Ave. between 9th and 10th Sts. 40°40′13″N 73°59′24″W | Park Slope and Gowanus | Subway station (F and G trains); part of the New York City Subway System MPS |
| 2 | 9th Avenue Station (Dual System BRT) | 9th Avenue Station (Dual System BRT) | July 6, 2005 (#05000676) | 38th St. and 9th Ave. near the junction of New Utrecht Ave. 40°38′47″N 73°59′41″W | Sunset Park | Subway station (D, R, and W train); part of the New York City Subway System MPS |
| 3 | 15th Street – Prospect Park Subway Station (IND) | 15th Street – Prospect Park Subway Station (IND) | July 27, 2005 (#05000748) | 15th St./Prospect Park W and SW; 40°39′37″N 73°58′49″W | Windsor Terrace and Park Slope | Subway station (F and G trains); part of the New York City Subway System MPS |
| 4 | 68th Police Precinct Station House and Stable | 68th Police Precinct Station House and Stable | June 3, 1982 (#82003359) | 4302 4th Ave. 40°39′01″N 74°00′34″W | Sunset Park | |
| 5 | 75th Police Precinct Station House | 75th Police Precinct Station House | September 10, 2007 (#07000952) | 484 Liberty Ave. 40°40′29″N 73°53′33″W | East New York | |
| 6 | 83rd Precinct Police Station and Stable | 83rd Precinct Police Station and Stable | April 14, 1982 (#82003360) | 179 Wilson Ave. 40°42′06″N 73°55′25″W | Bushwick | |
| 7 | Albemarle-Kenmore Terraces Historic District | Albemarle-Kenmore Terraces Historic District | June 30, 1983 (#83001685) | Albemarle Terrace, Kenmore Terrace, and E. 21st St. 40°39′03″N 73°57′33″W | Flatbush | |
| 8 | Alku and Alku Toinen | Alku and Alku Toinen | May 20, 2019 (#100003932) | 816 and 826 43rd St. 40°38′40″N 73°59′56″W | Sunset Park | 1916 apartment buildings built for Finnish immigrant community are first purpose-built housing cooperatives in New York state. Photo shows Alku Toinen ("Beginning Two") |
| 9 | Andrews United Methodist Church | Andrews United Methodist Church | January 22, 1992 (#91001977) | 95 Richmond St. 40°41′07″N 73°52′38″W | East New York | |
| 10 | Astral Apartments | Astral Apartments | October 29, 1982 (#82001178) | 184 Franklin St. 40°43′54″N 73°57′28″W | Greenpoint | |
| 11 | Atlantic Avenue Control House | Atlantic Avenue Control House | May 6, 1980 (#80002643) | Flatbush and Atlantic Aves. 40°41′04″N 73°58′42″W | Downtown Brooklyn | part of the Interborough Rapid Transit Subway Control Houses TR |
| 12 | Atlantic Avenue Subway Station (IRT and BMT) | Atlantic Avenue Subway Station (IRT and BMT) | September 17, 2004 (#04001023) | Junction of Flatbush Ave. at Atlantic and 4th Aves. 40°41′05″N 73°58′42″W | Downtown Brooklyn | Subway station (2, 3, 4, 5, B, D, N, Q, R and W trains); part of the New York City Subway System MPS |
| 13 | Atlantic Avenue Tunnel | Atlantic Avenue Tunnel | September 7, 1989 (#89001388) | Below Atlantic Ave. between Boerum Pl. and Columbia St. 40°41′30″N 74°00′00″W | Cobble Hill | |
| 14 | Austin, Nichols and Company Warehouse | Austin, Nichols and Company Warehouse | June 28, 2007 (#07000629) | 184 Kent Ave. 40°43′07″N 73°57′54″W | Williamsburg | |
| 15 | Avenue U Station (Dual System BRT) | Avenue U Station (Dual System BRT) | July 6, 2005 (#05000675) | Bet. Ave. U and Ave. T and 7th and 8th Sts. 40°35′50″N 73°58′46″W | Gravesend | Subway station (N and W train); part of the New York City Subway System MPS |
| 16 | B&B Carousell | B&B Carousell | February 23, 2016 (#16000035) | 1615 Boardwalk; 40°34′23″N 73°59′00″W | Coney Island | Coney Island's only remaining original carousel dates to 1906 |
| 17 | Baptist Temple (Brooklyn, New York) | Baptist Temple (Brooklyn, New York) | November 20, 1995 (#95001334) | 360 Schermerhorn St. 40°41′11″N 73°58′50″W | Downtown Brooklyn | |
| 18 | Bay Parkway Station (Dual System BRT) | Bay Parkway Station (Dual System BRT) | July 6, 2005 (#05000670) | Above Bay Parkway at 86th St. 40°36′06″N 73°59′40″W | Bensonhurst and Bath Beach | Subway station (D, R, and W train); part of the New York City Subway System MPS |
| 19 | Bay Ridge United Methodist Church | | September 9, 1999 (#99001132) | 7002 Fourth St. 40°38′01″N 74°01′29″W | Bay Ridge | Razed 21 October 2008 |
| 20 | Bay Ridge Reformed Church | Bay Ridge Reformed Church | August 17, 2020 (#100005438) | 7915 Ridge Blvd. 40°37′43″N 74°01′54″W | Bay Ridge | |
| 21 | Bay View Houses | Bay View Houses | February 26, 2026 (#100012749) | Bounded by Seaview Avenue to the north, East 102nd Street to the east, Shore Parkway to the south, and Rockaway Parkway to the west 40°38′00″N 73°53′10″W | | |
| 22 | Beth El Jewish Center of Flatbush | Beth El Jewish Center of Flatbush | May 29, 2009 (#09000377) | 1981 Homecrest Ave. 40°36′04″N 73°57′35″W | Flatbush | |
| 23 | Beth Olam Cemetery | Beth Olam Cemetery | May 16, 2016 (#16000254) | 2 Cypress Hills St. 40°41′26″N 73°52′48″W | Cypress Hills | Rural cemetery started in 1851 by three Jewish congregations in the city; contains many examples of architecture and funerary art. Shared with Queens. |
| 24 | Beverley Road Subway Station (BRT pre-Dual System) | Beverley Road Subway Station (BRT pre-Dual System) | September 17, 2004 (#04001024) | Beverley Rd. at Marlborough Rd. 40°38′39″N 73°57′53″W | Flatbush | Subway station (Q train); part of the New York City Subway System MPS |
| 25 | Boathouse on the Lullwater of the Lake in Prospect Park | Boathouse on the Lullwater of the Lake in Prospect Park | January 7, 1972 (#72000850) | Prospect Park; 40°39′39″N 73°57′55″W | Prospect Park (Brooklyn) | |
| 26 | Boerum Hill Historic District | Boerum Hill Historic District | September 26, 1983 (#83001686) | Roughly bounded by Pacific, Wyckoff, Bergen, Nevins, Bond and Hoyt Sts. 40°41′07″N 73°59′13″W | Boerum Hill | |
| 27 | Borough Hall Subway Station (IRT) | Borough Hall Subway Station (IRT) | September 17, 2004 (#04001022) | Junction of Joralemon, Court and Adams Sts. 40°41′32″N 73°59′27″W | Downtown Brooklyn | Subway station (4 and 5 trains); part of the New York City Subway System MPS |
| 28 | Boy's High School | Boy's High School | February 25, 1982 (#82003361) | 832 Marcy Ave. 40°41′04″N 73°56′54″W | Bedford-Stuyvesant | |
| 29 | Brooklyn Academy of Music | Brooklyn Academy of Music | May 2, 2006 (#06000251) | 30 Lafayette Ave. 40°41′11″N 73°58′41″W | Fort Greene | |
| 30 | Brooklyn Borough Hall | Brooklyn Borough Hall | January 10, 1980 (#80002630) | 209 Joralemon St. 40°41′34″N 73°59′27″W | Downtown Brooklyn | |
| 31 | Brooklyn Bridge | Brooklyn Bridge | October 15, 1966 (#66000523) | Across the East River from Brooklyn to Manhattan; 40°42′23″N 73°59′51″W | DUMBO and Brooklyn Heights | |
| 32 | Brooklyn Gardens Apartments (Navy Yard) | | December 29, 2025 (#100012420) | 105 Carlton Avenue and 104 Adelphi Street; 40°41′40″N 73°58′23″W | | |
| 33 | Brooklyn Heights Historic District | Brooklyn Heights Historic District | October 15, 1966 (#66000524) | Borough of Brooklyn, bounded by Atlantic Ave., Court and Fulton Sts. and the East River; 40°41′48″N 73°59′48″W | Brooklyn Heights | |
| 34 | Brooklyn Historical Society | Brooklyn Historical Society | July 17, 1991 (#91002054) | 128 Pierrepont St. 40°41′41″N 73°59′34″W | Brooklyn Heights | |
| 35 | Brooklyn Museum | Brooklyn Museum | August 22, 1977 (#77000944) | Eastern Parkway and Washington Ave. 40°40′14″N 73°57′51″W | Prospect Heights | |
| 36 | Brooklyn Navy Yard Historic District | Brooklyn Navy Yard Historic District | May 22, 2014 (#14000261) | Little, Evans, Navy & Williamsburg Sts., Hudson & Flushing Aves., Wallabout Bay; 40°42′00″N 73°58′12″W | Wallabout Basin | Shipyard where naval vessels were built and maintained from Revolution to World War II. |
| 37 | Brooklyn Public Library-Central Building | Brooklyn Public Library-Central Building | January 11, 2002 (#01001446) | Grand Army Plaza; 40°40′20″N 73°58′07″W | Grand Army Plaza | |
| 38 | Brooklyn Trust Company Building | Brooklyn Trust Company Building | August 20, 2009 (#09000632) | 177 Montague St. 40°41′39″N 73°59′33″W | Brooklyn Heights | |
| 39 | Brooklyn VA Hospital Historic District | Brooklyn VA Hospital Historic District | May 23, 2022 (#100007725) | 800 Poly Pl. 40°36′32″N 74°01′25″W | Dyker Heights | |
| 40 | Boulevard Houses | | May 26, 2022 (#100007744) | 804-920 Ashford St., 357-363 Wortman, 785-893 Schenck, and 738-765 Stanley Aves., 2156-2202 Linden Blvd. 40°39′38″N 73°52′53″W | East New York | |
| 41 | Building at 240 Broadway | Building at 240 Broadway | April 22, 2021 (#100006482) | 240 Broadway; 40°42′32″N 73°57′36″W | Williamsburg | |
| 42 | Buildings at 375–379 Flatbush Avenue and 185–187 Sterling Place | Buildings at 375–379 Flatbush Avenue and 185–187 Sterling Place | September 7, 1984 (#84002440) | 375–379 Flatbush Ave. and 185–187 Sterling Pl. 40°40′36″N 73°58′19″W | Prospect Heights | |
| 43 | Bushwick Avenue Central Methodist Episcopal Church | Bushwick Avenue Central Methodist Episcopal Church | March 27, 2017 (#100000812) | 1123 Bushwick Avenue; 40°41′23″N 73°55′03″W | Bushwick | Italian Renaissance Revival church built in first decade of 20th century, when Bushwick was growing rapidly. |
| 44 | Carroll Gardens Historic District | Carroll Gardens Historic District | September 26, 1983 (#83001687) | Carroll and President Sts. between Smith and Hoyt Sts. 40°40′47″N 73°59′25″W | Carroll Gardens | |
| 45 | Casemate Fort, Whiting Quadrangle | Casemate Fort, Whiting Quadrangle | August 7, 1974 (#74001249) | Fort Hamilton, off NY 27; 40°36′31″N 74°01′58″W | Fort Hamilton | |
| 46 | Christ Evangelical English Lutheran Church | Christ Evangelical English Lutheran Church | August 30, 2007 (#07000870) | 1084 Lafayette Ave. 40°41′32″N 73°55′45″W | Bedford–Stuyvesant | |
| 47 | Church of the Holy Innocents | Church of the Holy Innocents | June 16, 2005 (#05000617) | 279 E. 17th St. 40°38′39″N 73°57′46″W | Flatbush | |
| 48 | Clinton Hill Historic District | Clinton Hill Historic District | June 19, 1985 (#85001335) | Roughly bounded by Willoughby and Grand Aves., Fulton St. and Vanderbilt Ave. 40°41′14″N 73°57′55″W | Clinton Hill | |
| 49 | Clinton Hill South Historic District | Clinton Hill South Historic District | July 17, 1986 (#86001675) | Roughly Lefferts and Brevoort Pl. between Washington Ave. and Bedford Pl. 40°40′50″N 73°57′32″W | Clinton Hill | |
| 50 | Cobble Hill Historic District | Cobble Hill Historic District | June 11, 1976 (#76001225) | Roughly bounded by Atlantic Ave., Court, Degraw and Hicks Sts. 40°41′21″N 73°59′47″W | Cobble Hill | |
| 51 | Coney Island Fire Station Pumping Station | Coney Island Fire Station Pumping Station | December 8, 1981 (#81000405) | 2301 Neptune Ave. 40°34′43″N 73°59′31″W | Coney Island | |
| 52 | Coney Island Yard Electric Motor Repair Shop | Coney Island Yard Electric Motor Repair Shop | February 9, 2006 (#06000016) | SW corner of Avenue X and Shell Rd. 40°35′23″N 73°58′31″W | Coney Island | part of the New York City Subway System MPS |
| 53 | Coney Island Yard Gatehouse | Coney Island Yard Gatehouse | February 9, 2006 (#06000017) | SW corner of Shell Rd. and Avenue X 40°35′22″N 73°58′30″W | Coney Island | part of the New York City Subway System MPS |
| 54 | Congregation Beth Israel | Congregation Beth Israel | April 30, 2009 (#09000256) | 203 E. 37th St. 40°39′08″N 73°56′35″W | East Flatbush | |
| 55 | Congregation Chevra Linath Hazedeck | Congregation Chevra Linath Hazedeck | February 16, 2016 (#16000016) | 109 Clara St. 40°38′34″N 73°59′02″W | Kensington | Synagogue completed in 1932 reflects era when Brooklyn was becoming one of the world's major Jewish population centers |
| 56 | Congregational Church of the Evangel | Congregational Church of the Evangel | December 11, 2009 (#09001081) | 1950 Bedford Ave. 40°39′27″N 73°57′24″W | Flatbush | |
| 57 | Congregation Tifereth Israel | Congregation Tifereth Israel | January 11, 2002 (#01001442) | 1320 Eight Ave. 40°39′47″N 73°58′56″W | South Slope | |
| 58 | William B. Cronyn House | William B. Cronyn House | June 3, 1982 (#82005030) | 271 9th St. 40°40′11″N 73°59′16″W | Park Slope | |
| 59 | Crown Heights North Historic District | Crown Heights North Historic District | March 31, 2014Boundary increase: 2016-03-11 (#14000092) | Albany, Brooklyn & St. Mark's Aves., Dean & Pacific Sts., Hampton, Lincoln, Park, Prospect, Revere & St. John's Pls. 40°40′36″N 73°56′43″W | Crown Heights | Neighborhood first developed in 1870 contains over 1,500 well-preserved buildings in distinct period styles up to 1930s. 2016 boundary increase added properties related to Shirley Chisholm, first African-American woman in Congress. |
| 60 | Cuyler Presbyterian Church | Cuyler Presbyterian Church | March 23, 2001 (#01000253) | 358-360 Pacific St. 40°41′12″N 73°59′13″W | Boerum Hill | |
| 61 | Cyclone Roller Coaster | Cyclone Roller Coaster | June 25, 1991 (#91000907) | 834 Surf Ave. at W. 10th St. 40°34′30″N 73°58′44″W | Coney Island | |
| 62 | Cypress Avenue West Historic District | Cypress Avenue West Historic District | September 30, 1983 (#83001768) | Roughly bounded by St. Nicholas and Seneca Aves., Linden and Stockholm Sts. 40°42′15″N 73°54′46″W | Bushwick | part of the Ridgewood MRA |
| 63 | Cypress Hills National Cemetery | Cypress Hills National Cemetery | November 13, 1997 (#97001439) | 625 Jamaica Ave. 40°41′14″N 73°52′55″W | Cypress Hills | part of the Civil War Era National Cemeteries MPS |
| 64 | Ditmas Park Historic District | Ditmas Park Historic District | September 30, 1983 (#83001688) | Bounded by Marlborough Rd., Dorchester, Ocean, and Newkirk Aves. 40°38′19″N 73°57′40″W | Ditmas Park | |
| 65 | DUMBO Industrial District | DUMBO Industrial District | September 22, 2000 (#00001151) | Roughly bounded by Main and Washington Sts, East River, John St., Bridge and Jay Sts., and Front and York Sts. 40°42′11″N 73°59′17″W | DUMBO | |
| 66 | East Midwood Jewish Center | East Midwood Jewish Center | June 7, 2006 (#06000478) | 1625 Ocean Ave. 40°37′20″N 73°57′20″W | Midwood | |
| 67 | Eastern Parkway | Eastern Parkway | September 26, 1983 (#83001689) | Eastern Pkwy from Grand Army Plaza to Ralph Ave. 40°40′14″N 73°58′08″W | Prospect Park to Weeksville/Crown Heights | 1870s-built boulevard considered to be the first parkway. Segment between Ralph and Bushwick Avenues not part of the NRHP. |
| 68 | Eighth Avenue (14th Brooklyn Regiment) Armory | Eighth Avenue (14th Brooklyn Regiment) Armory | April 14, 1994 (#94000367) | 1402 Eighth Ave. 40°39′46″N 73°59′00″W | Park Slope | Former home of 14th Brooklyn Regiment; part of the Army National Guard Armories in New York State MPS |
| 69 | Emmanuel Baptist Church | Emmanuel Baptist Church | December 16, 1977 (#77000945) | 279 Lafayette Ave. 40°41′17″N 73°58′10″W | Clinton Hill | |
| 70 | English Evangelical Lutheran Church of the Reformation | | May 1, 2023 (#100008887) | 105 Barbey St. 40°40′51″N 73°53′22″W | Cypress Hills | |
| 71 | Erasmus Hall Academy | Erasmus Hall Academy | November 11, 1975 (#75001192) | Between Flatbush, Bedford, Church, and Snyder Aves. 40°38′58″N 73°57′28″W | Flatbush | |
| 72 | Evergreens Cemetery | Evergreens Cemetery | November 15, 2007 (#07001192) | 1629 Bushwick Ave. 40°41′04″N 73°54′04″W | Brooklyn | |
| 73 | Federal Building and Post Office | Federal Building and Post Office | October 9, 1974 (#74001250) | 271 Cadman Plaza, E. 40°41′44″N 73°59′24″W | Downtown Brooklyn | |
| 74 | Feuchtwanger Stable | Feuchtwanger Stable | March 20, 1986 (#86000485) | 159 Carlton Ave. 40°41′34″N 73°58′22″W | Fort Greene | |
| 75 | Fiorentino Plaza | | May 31, 2022 (#100007746) | 2155, 2165, 2181-2189, 2211, 2215, 2219-2221 Pitkin and 320,340 Miller Aves. 40°40′22″N 73°53′30″W | East New York | |
| 76 | Flatbush Dutch Reformed Church Complex | Flatbush Dutch Reformed Church Complex | September 8, 1983 (#83001690) | 890 Flatbush Ave. and 2101-2103 Kenmore Terr. 40°39′00″N 73°57′33″W | Flatbush | |
| 77 | Flatbush Town Hall | Flatbush Town Hall | July 24, 1972 (#72000851) | 35 Snyder Ave. 40°38′56″N 73°57′26″W | Flatbush | |
| 78 | Flatlands Dutch Reformed Church | Flatlands Dutch Reformed Church | August 30, 1979 (#79001588) | Kings Hwy. and E. 40th St. 40°37′26″N 73°56′13″W | Flatlands | |
| 79 | Floyd Bennett Field Historic District | Floyd Bennett Field Historic District | April 11, 1980 (#80000363) | Flatbush Ave. 40°35′17″N 73°53′32″W | Marine Park | |
| 80 | Fort Greene Historic District | Fort Greene Historic District | September 26, 1983 (#83001691) | Roughly bounded by Ft. Greene Pl., Fulton St., Vanderbilt and Myrtle Aves.; also roughly bounded by Ashland Pl., DeKalb Ave., Hanson Pl., and Oxford St., Adelphi St., Vanderbilt and Myrtle Aves. 40°41′19″N 73°58′19″W | Fort Greene | Second set of boundaries represents a boundary increase of September 7, 1984 |
| 81 | Fourth Avenue Methodist Episcopal Church | Fourth Avenue Methodist Episcopal Church | August 8, 2019 (#100004245) | 4616 Fourth Avenue; 40°38′55″N 74°00′39″W | Sunset Park | 1890s church was a focal point for development of Sunset Park; also well-preserved Akron Plan church |
| 82 | Friends Meetinghouse and School | Friends Meetinghouse and School | November 4, 1982 (#82001179) | 110 Schermerhorn St. 40°41′23″N 73°59′24″W | Downtown Brooklyn | |
| 83 | Fulton Ferry District | Fulton Ferry District | June 28, 1974 (#74001251) | Roughly bounded by the East River and Washington, Water, Front, and Doughty Sts. 40°42′12″N 73°59′35″W | Fulton Ferry | |
| 84 | Fulton Park Plaza | | February 13, 2026 (#100012707) | 1711 Fulton Street; 40°40′47″N 73°55′49″W | | |
| 85 | Gage and Tollner Restaurant | Gage and Tollner Restaurant | June 3, 1982 (#82003362) | 372 Fulton St. 40°41′28″N 73°59′17″W | Downtown Brooklyn | |
| 86 | German Evangelical Lutheran St. John's Church | German Evangelical Lutheran St. John's Church | January 31, 2019 (#100003399) | 195 Maujer St. 40°42′40″N 73°56′34″W | Williamsburg | Info here |
| 87 | Grecian Shelter | Grecian Shelter | January 20, 1972 (#72000852) | Prospect Park near Parkside Ave. 40°39′13″N 73°58′03″W | Prospect Park | |
| 88 | Green-Wood Cemetery | Green-Wood Cemetery | March 8, 1997 (#97000228) | 500 25th Street; 40°39′08″N 73°59′26″W | Greenwood Heights | |
| 89 | Greenwood Baptist Church | Greenwood Baptist Church | February 16, 2016 (#16000017) | 461 6th St. 40°40′08″N 73°58′49″W | Park Slope | Gothic Revival church built in 1900, designed by architect Adolph F. Leicht |
| 90 | Greenpoint Historic District | Greenpoint Historic District | September 26, 1983 (#83001692) | Roughly bounded by Kent, Calyer, Noble, and Franklin Sts., Clifford Pl. and Manhattan Ave. 40°43′43″N 73°57′20″W | Greenpoint | |
| 91 | Hanson Place Seventh Day Adventist Church | Hanson Place Seventh Day Adventist Church | April 23, 1980 (#80002631) | 88 Hanson Pl. 40°41′07″N 73°58′28″W | Fort Greene | |
| 92 | Holy Trinity Church (Protestant Episcopal) | Holy Trinity Church (Protestant Episcopal) | December 23, 1987 (#87002590) | 157 Montague St. 40°41′40″N 73°59′35″W | Brooklyn Heights | |
| 93 | Houses at 216–264 Ovington Ave. | Houses at 216–264 Ovington Ave. | June 5, 2007 (#07000488) | 216–264 Ovington Ave. 40°38′05″N 74°01′42″W | Bay Ridge | |
| 94 | Hubbard House | Hubbard House | June 2, 2000 (#00000575) | 2138 McDonald Ave. 40°36′00″N 73°58′25″W | Gravesend | |
| 95 | Hunterfly Road Historic District | Hunterfly Road Historic District | December 5, 1972 (#72000853) | 1698, 1700, 1702, 1704, 1706, 1708 Bergen St. 40°40′28″N 73°55′32″W | Weeksville | |
| 96 | Immanuel Congregational Church | Immanuel Congregational Church | June 7, 2006 (#06000479) | 461 Decatur St. 40°40′57″N 73°55′30″W | Bedford–Stuyvesant | |
| 97 | Industrial Complex at 221 McKibbin Street | Industrial Complex at 221 McKibbin Street | May 12, 2009 (#09000303) | 221 McKibbin St. 40°42′20″N 73°56′19″W | East Williamsburg | |
| 98 | The Jewish Center of Coney Island | The Jewish Center of Coney Island | December 11, 2013 (#13000908) | 2915 Ocean Parkway; 40°34′47″N 73°58′09″W | Brighton Beach | First synagogue serving newly established Jewish community in Brighton Beach, built ca. 1930, uses unique combination of Renaissance Revival and Semitic architectural styles. |
| 99 | Jewish Center of Kings Highway | Jewish Center of Kings Highway | February 12, 2010 (#10000009) | 1202-1218 Ave. P 40°36′36″N 73°57′39″W | Flatbush | |
| 100 | Kings County Savings Bank | Kings County Savings Bank | April 16, 1980 (#80002632) | 135 Broadway; 40°42′37″N 73°57′51″W | Williamsburg | |
| 101 | Kingsway Jewish Center | Kingsway Jewish Center | February 12, 2010 (#10000010) | 2810 Nostrand Ave. 40°36′57″N 73°56′41″W | Midwood | |
| 102 | Kismet Temple | Kismet Temple | December 11, 2013 (#13000909) | 92 Herkimer St. 40°40′45″N 73°57′10″W | Bedford–Stuyvesant | |
| 103 | Knickerbocker Field Club | Knickerbocker Field Club | October 29, 1982 (#82001180) | 114 E. 18th St. 40°38′52″N 73°57′49″W | Prospect Park South | Destroyed by fire in 1988, building pictured is the modern replacement. |
| 104 | Kol Israel Synagogue | Kol Israel Synagogue | December 2, 2009 (#09000966) | 603 St. John's Place; 40°40′22″N 73°57′29″W | Crown Heights | |
| 105 | Lehigh Valley Railroad Barge No. 79 | Lehigh Valley Railroad Barge No. 79 | June 2, 2015 (#15000309) | 290 Conover St. 40°40′31″N 74°01′11″W | Red Hook | Moved here from Edgewater, N.J. |
| 106 | Lefferts Manor Historic District | Lefferts Manor Historic District | May 18, 1992 (#83004872) | Roughly bounded by Lincoln Rd., Fenimore St., Rogers Ave. and Flatbush Ave.; also Fenimore, Maple & Midwood Sts., Lincoln & Rutland Rds., Bedford Ave. 40°39′26″N 73°57′26″W | Prospect Lefferts Gardens | Second set of addresses represent a boundary increase approved November 9, 2017 |
| 107 | Lefferts-Laidlaw House | Lefferts-Laidlaw House | September 12, 1985 (#85002279) | 136 Clinton St. 40°41′37″N 73°58′10″W | Brooklyn Heights | |
| 108 | Lewis Avenue Congregational Church | Lewis Avenue Congregational Church | January 24, 2020 (#100004908) | 275 Lewis Ave., 574 Madison St. 40°41′11″N 73°56′08″W | Bedford–Stuyvesant | |
| 109 | Lincoln Club | Lincoln Club | January 27, 1983 (#83001693) | 65 Putnam Ave. 40°40′59″N 73°57′35″W | Clinton Hill | |
| 110 | Linden Plaza | | August 17, 2026 (#100013312) | Generally bounded by Linden Blvd, Lincoln Ave, Sutter Ave, and Eldert Ln; 40°40′15″N 73°51′53″W | | Listed incorrectly by the NPS in New York County. |
| 111 | Litchfield Villa | Litchfield Villa | September 14, 1977 (#77000946) | Prospect Park W. and 5th St. 40°40′08″N 73°58′26″W | Prospect Park | |
| 112 | Loew's Kameo Theater | Loew's Kameo Theater | April 22, 2021 (#100006483) | 530 Eastern Pkwy. 40°40′11″N 73°57′03″W | Crown Heights | |
| 113 | Loew's Kings Theatre | Loew's Kings Theatre | August 22, 2012 (#12000534) | 1027 Flatbush Ave; 40°38′45″N 73°57′27″W | Flatbush | 1929 Rapp and Rapp theater, unusually spacious for the area, closed in 1977. Sylvester Stallone once worked as an usher. |
| 114 | Louise Terrace-Colonial Road Historic District | | January 22, 2025 (#100010983) | 7001-7024 Louise Terrace; 7002-7024 Colonial Road; 40°38′11″N 74°01′57″W | Bay Ridge | |
| 115 | Hendrick I. Lott House | Hendrick I. Lott House | March 3, 1994 (#83004645) | 1940 E. 36th St. 40°36′37″N 73°55′58″W | Marine Park | |
| 116 | Magen David Synagogue | Magen David Synagogue | April 15, 2004 (#04000293) | 2017 67th St. 40°36′54″N 73°59′12″W | Bensonhurst | |
| 117 | Manhattan Beach Jewish Center | Manhattan Beach Jewish Center | May 26, 2015 (#15000266) | 60 West End Ave. 40°34′49″N 73°57′22″W | Manhattan Beach | 1952 Bauhaus-influenced synagogue building |
| 118 | Manhattan Bridge | Manhattan Bridge | August 30, 1983 (#83001694) | Spans East River between Front and Canal St. 40°42′36″N 73°59′18″W | Downtown Brooklyn | |
| 119 | MARY A. WHALEN (tanker) | MARY A. WHALEN (tanker) | October 3, 2012 (#12000831) | Pier 9B, Red Hook Container Terminal; 40°41′05″N 74°00′28″W | Red Hook | Tanker that shipped oil along East Coast; at center of United States v. Reliable Transfer Co., seminal decision in maritime law |
| 120 | Monsignor McGolrick Park and Shelter Pavilion | Monsignor McGolrick Park and Shelter Pavilion | May 6, 1980 (#80002633) | Bounded by Nassau and Driggs Aves., Russell and Monitor Sts. 40°43′28″N 73°56′38″W | Greenpoint | |
| 121 | Moslem Mosque | Moslem Mosque | July 30, 2021 (#100006779) | 104-106 Powers St. 40°42′43″N 73°56′48″W | Williamsburg | |
| 122 | New England Congregational Church and Rectory | New England Congregational Church and Rectory | September 15, 1983 (#83001695) | 177-179 S. 9th St. 40°42′31″N 73°57′45″W | Williamsburg | |
| 123 | New Lots Reformed Church and Cemetery | New Lots Reformed Church and Cemetery | May 19, 1983 (#83001696) | 630 New Lots Ave. 40°39′53″N 73°53′08″W | New Lots | |
| 124 | New Utrecht Avenue Station (Dual System BRT) | New Utrecht Avenue Station (Dual System BRT) | July 6, 2005 (#05000678) | Beneath the junction of New Utrecht Ave. with 15th Ave. and 62nd St. 40°37′29″N 73°59′48″W | Bensonhurst and Borough Park | Subway station (N and W train); part of the New York City Subway System MPS |
| 125 | New Utrecht Reformed Church and Buildings | New Utrecht Reformed Church and Buildings | April 9, 1980 (#80002634) | 18th Ave. and 83rd St.; also 8523 16th Ave. 40°36′30″N 74°00′03″W | New Utrecht | 16th Ave. represents a boundary increase of March 5, 2001, the "New Utrecht Reformed Church Complex" |
| 126 | New York Congregational Home for the Aged | New York Congregational Home for the Aged | November 5, 2008 (#08001033) | 123 Linden Blvd. 40°39′09″N 73°57′15″W | Flatbush | |
| 127 | Nostrand Houses | | June 10, 2026 (#100013099) | Generally bounded by Batchelder St; Bragg St; Avenue W; Avenue X 40°35′44″N 73°56′12″W | | |
| 128 | Ocean Parkway | Ocean Parkway | September 8, 1983 (#83001697) | From Church Ave. to Seabreeze Ave. 40°36′19″N 73°58′11″W | Brighton Beach to Kensington | 1870s Boulevard considered to be the second parkway, planned at the same time as Eastern Parkway (see above). |
| 129 | Ocean Parkway Jewish Center | Ocean Parkway Jewish Center | December 11, 2009 (#09001082) | 550 Ocean Pkwy. 40°38′04″N 73°58′23″W | Kensington | |
| 130 | Ocean Parkway Station (Dual System BRT) | Ocean Parkway Station (Dual System BRT) | July 29, 2005 (#05000749) | Above the junction of Brighton Beach Ave. and Ocean Pkwy; 40°34′35″N 73°58′08″W | Brighton Beach | Subway station (Q train); part of the New York City Subway System MPS |
| 131 | Offerman Building | Offerman Building | February 21, 2017 (#100000661) | 503 Fulton St. 40°41′25″N 73°59′05″W | Downtown Brooklyn | |
| 132 | Old Brooklyn Fire Headquarters | Old Brooklyn Fire Headquarters | January 20, 1972 (#72000854) | 365-367 Jay St. 40°41′34″N 73°59′15″W | Downtown Brooklyn | |
| 133 | Nassau Brewing Company | Nassau Brewing Company | October 22, 2014 (#14000873) | 925-949 Bergen & 1024 Dean Sts. 40°40′37″N 73°57′30″W | Crown Heights | 1865 brewery complex reflecting influx of German immigrants to the area at that time |
| 134 | Old First Reformed Church | Old First Reformed Church | April 1, 1998 (#98000316) | 729 Carroll St. 40°40′24″N 73°58′37″W | Park Slope | |
| 135 | Old Gravesend Cemetery | Old Gravesend Cemetery | September 17, 1980 (#80002635) | Gravesend Neck Rd. and MacDonald Ave. 40°35′41″N 73°58′30″W | Gravesend | |
| 136 | The Old Stone House of Brooklyn | The Old Stone House of Brooklyn | September 19, 2012 (#12000797) | 3rd St. at 5th Ave. 40°40′23″N 73°59′04″W | Park Slope | |
| 137 | Parachute Jump | Parachute Jump | September 2, 1980 (#80002645) | Coney Island; 40°34′23″N 73°59′04″W | Coney Island | |
| 138 | Park Slope Historic District | Park Slope Historic District | November 21, 1980 (#80002636) | Roughly bounded by Prospect Park West, Berkeley Pl., 15th St., 6th, 7th and Flatbush Aves. 40°40′08″N 73°58′35″W | Park Slope | |
| 139 | Parkway Theatre | Parkway Theatre | March 31, 2010 (#10000136) | 1768 St. John's Pl. 40°40′12″N 73°55′08″W | Brownsville | |
| 140 | Plymouth Church of the Pilgrims | Plymouth Church of the Pilgrims | October 15, 1966 (#66000525) | 75 Hicks St. 40°41′57″N 73°59′37″W | Brooklyn Heights | |
| 141 | Pratt Institute Historic District | Pratt Institute Historic District | March 23, 2005 (#90001138) | Roughly bounded by Hall St., Dekalb Ave., Willoughby St. and Emerson Pl. 40°41′28″N 73°57′50″W | Clinton Hill | |
| 142 | Prospect Hall | Prospect Hall | April 15, 1999 (#99000460) | 263 Prospect Ave. 40°39′49″N 73°59′24″W | Prospect Heights | |
| 143 | Prospect Heights Historic District | Prospect Heights Historic District | September 15, 1983 boundary increased February 16, 2016 (#83001698) | Portions of Bergen and Dean Sts., Flatbush, Underhill, Vanderbelt & Washington Aves., Butler, Prospect & Sterling Pls. 40°40′44″N 73°58′20″W | Prospect Heights | |
| 144 | Prospect Lefferts Gardens Historic District | Prospect Lefferts Gardens Historic District | June 30, 2023 (#100009073) | Portions of Sterling, Maple, Midwood, and Fenimore Sts., Lefferts, Bedford, Rogers and Nostrand Aves., Lincoln and Rutland Rds. 40°39′31″N 73°57′12″W | Prospect Lefferts Gardens | |
| 145 | Prospect Park | Prospect Park | September 17, 1980 (#80002637) | Bounded by Parkside, Ocean and Flatbush Aves., Prospect Park W., and Prospect SW. 40°39′34″N 73°58′14″W | Brooklyn | |
| 146 | Prospect Park South Historic District | Prospect Park South Historic District | July 21, 1983 (#83001699) | Roughly bounded by BMT RR Tracks, Beverly Rd., and Coney Island and Church Aves. 40°38′46″N 73°58′01″W | Flatbush | |
| 147 | Public Bath No. 7 | Public Bath No. 7 | September 12, 1985 (#85002275) | 227-231 Fourth Ave. 40°40′36″N 73°59′00″W | Park Slope | |
| 148 | Public School 108 | Public School 108 | December 10, 1982 (#82003363) | 200 Lindwood St. 40°40′52″N 73°53′05″W | Cypress Hills | |
| 149 | Public School 111 and Public School 9 Annex | Public School 111 and Public School 9 Annex | December 14, 1981 (#81000407) | 249 Sterling Place and 251 Sterling Place; 40°40′35″N 73°58′11″W | Prospect Heights | |
| 150 | Public School 39 | Public School 39 | April 17, 1980 (#80002646) | 417 6th Ave. 40°40′07″N 73°59′02″W | Park Slope | |
| 151 | Public School 65K | Public School 65K | December 10, 1981 (#81000408) | 158 Richmond St. 40°40′59″N 73°52′40″W | Cypress Hills | |
| 152 | Public School 7 | Public School 7 | November 3, 1983 (#83003986) | 131-143 York St. 40°42′06″N 73°59′09″W | Downtown Brooklyn | |
| 153 | Public School 71K | Public School 71K | November 4, 1982 (#82001181) | 119 Heyward St. 40°42′06″N 73°57′24″W | Williamsburg | |
| 154 | Quarters A | Quarters A | May 30, 1974 (#74001252) | U.S. Naval Facility; 40°42′09″N 73°58′49″W | Brooklyn Navy Yard | |
| 155 | John Rankin House | John Rankin House | November 16, 1978 (#78001856) | 440 Clinton St. 40°40′53″N 73°59′56″W | Carroll Gardens | |
| 156 | Renaissance Apartments | Renaissance Apartments | August 22, 1995 (#95001026) | 480 Nostrand Ave. 40°40′56″N 73°57′02″W | Bedford–Stuyvesant | |
| 157 | Ridgewood Reservoir | Ridgewood Reservoir | February 2, 2018 (#100002074) | Jackie Robinson Pkwy., Vermont Pl., Cypress Hills St. & Highland Blvd. 40°41′21″N 73°53′11″W | Highland Park | Only remaining component of municipal water system built by independent city of Brooklyn in the mid-19th century; part of unified city water system until 1989 |
| 158 | John Roosevelt "Jackie" Robinson House | John Roosevelt "Jackie" Robinson House | May 11, 1976 (#76001226) | 5224 Tilden St. 40°38′54″N 73°54′54″W | East Flatbush | |
| 159 | Rockwood Chocolate Factory Historic District | Rockwood Chocolate Factory Historic District | October 6, 1983 (#83003991) | 54-88 Washington, 13-53 Waverly, and 255-275 Park Aves. 40°41′47″N 73°58′06″W | Fort Greene | |
| 160 | Rugby Congregational Church | Rugby Congregational Church | August 17, 2020 (#100005439) | 4901 Snyder Ave. 40°39′00″N 73°55′52″W | East Flatbush | Also known as "The Rugby Deliverance Tabernacle" |
| 161 | Russian Orthodox Cathedral of the Transfiguration of Our Lord | Russian Orthodox Cathedral of the Transfiguration of Our Lord | April 16, 1980 (#80002638) | 228 N. 12th St. 40°43′10″N 73°57′14″W | Greenpoint | |
| 162 | Saitta House | Saitta House | May 30, 2007 (#07000480) | 1135 84th St. 40°37′02″N 74°00′59″W | Dyker Heights | |
| 163 | Senator Street Historic District | Senator Street Historic District | October 10, 2002 (#02001115) | 317-370 Senator St. 40°38′12″N 74°01′27″W | Bay Ridge | |
| 164 | Shaari Zedek Synagogue | Shaari Zedek Synagogue | December 4, 2009 (#09000968) | 767 Putnam Ave. 40°41′11″N 73°55′51″W | Bedford-Stuyvesant | |
| 165 | South Bushwick Reformed Protestant Dutch Church Complex | South Bushwick Reformed Protestant Dutch Church Complex | November 4, 1982 (#82001182) | 855-857 Bushwick Ave. 40°41′39″N 73°55′34″W | South Bushwick | Destroyed in a 2026 fire. |
| 166 | South Congregational Church | South Congregational Church | November 4, 1982 (#82001183) | President and Court Sts. 40°40′55″N 73°59′48″W | South Brooklyn | |
| 167 | St. Bartholomew's Protestant Episcopal Church and Rectory | St. Bartholomew's Protestant Episcopal Church and Rectory | April 23, 1980 (#80002639) | 1227 Pacific St. 40°40′41″N 73°57′09″W | Crown Heights | |
| 168 | St. George's Protestant Episcopal Church | St. George's Protestant Episcopal Church | September 8, 1983 (#83001700) | 800 Marcy Ave. 40°41′10″N 73°56′54″W | Bedford-Stuyvesant | |
| 169 | St. Luke's Protestant Episcopal Church | St. Luke's Protestant Episcopal Church | September 16, 1982 (#82003364) | 520 Clinton Ave. 40°40′57″N 73°58′04″W | Clinton Hill | |
| 170 | St. Mary's Episcopal Church | St. Mary's Episcopal Church | July 21, 1983 (#83001701) | 230 Classon Ave. 40°41′34″N 73°57′42″W | Clinton Hill | |
| 171 | St. Paul's Protestant Episcopal Church | St. Paul's Protestant Episcopal Church | December 21, 1989 (#89002086) | 199 Carroll St. 40°40′55″N 73°58′25″W | South Brooklyn | |
| 172 | St. Peter's Protestant Episcopal Church | St. Peter's Protestant Episcopal Church | November 8, 2021 (#100007102) | 355 State St. 40°41′16″N 73°59′06″W | Boerum Hill | Since 1920, St. Nicholas Antiochian Orthodox Cathedral (Brooklyn), founded by St. Raphael of Brooklyn |
| 173 | State Street Houses | State Street Houses | January 17, 1980 (#80002640) | 291-299 (odd), 290-324 (even) State St. 40°41′19″N 73°59′16″W | Downtown | |
| 174 | Stoothoff-Baxter-Kouwenhaven House | Stoothoff-Baxter-Kouwenhaven House | November 14, 1982 (#82001184) | 1640 E. 48th St. 40°37′12″N 73°55′44″W | Flatlands | |
| 175 | Storehouse No. 2, U.S. Navy Fleet Supply Base | Storehouse No. 2, U.S. Navy Fleet Supply Base | February 20, 2013 (#13000026) | 850 3rd Ave. 40°39′34″N 74°00′16″W | Sunset Park | One of two remaining such facilities from base built for World War I. |
| 176 | Stuyvesant Gardens I | | May 19, 2025 (#100011817) | 835 Gates Avenue (and other addresses); 40°41′18″N 73°55′58″W | Bedford-Stuyvesant | |
| 177 | Stuyvesant Heights Historic District | Stuyvesant Heights Historic District | December 4, 1975 (#75001193) | Roughly bounded by Macon, Tompkins, Decatur, Lewis, Chauncey, and Stuyvesant; also roughly, Decatur St. from Tompkins to Lewis Aves. 40°40′52″N 73°56′14″W | Bedford-Stuyvesant | Second set of addresses represents a boundary increase of November 15, 1996 |
| 178 | Substation #401 | Substation #401 | July 6, 2005 (#05000680) | 3046 Fulton St. bet. Essex St. and Shepherd Ave. 40°40′49″N 73°52′59″W | East New York | part of the New York City Subway System MPS |
| 179 | Sunset Park Historic District | Sunset Park Historic District | September 15, 1988 (#88001464) | Roughly bounded by Fourth Ave., Thirty-eighth St., Seventh Ave. and Sixty-fourth St. 40°38′38″N 74°00′28″W | Sunset Park | |
| 180 | Talmud Torah Atereth Israel | | February 20, 2024 (#100009929) | 85 Fountain Avenue; 40°40′42″N 73°52′34″W | Cypress Hills | |
| 181 | Temple Beth El of Borough Park | Temple Beth El of Borough Park | April 27, 2010 (#10000224) | 4802 15th Ave. 40°37′59″N 73°59′14″W | Borough Park | |
| 182 | Twenty third Regiment Armory | Twenty third Regiment Armory | May 6, 1980 (#80002641) | 1322 Bedford Ave. 40°40′43″N 73°57′16″W | Crown Heights | |
| 183 | William Ulmer Brewery Complex | William Ulmer Brewery Complex | February 20, 2024 (#100009930) | 71-83 Beaver Street, 31-47 Belvidere Street, 26-28 Locust Street; 40°41′59″N 73°56′12″W | Bushwick | |
| 184 | Union Temple of Brooklyn | Union Temple of Brooklyn | May 18, 2015 (#15000232) | 17 Eastern Pkwy. 40°40′24″N 73°58′05″W | Prospect Heights | 1926 structure is an excellent example of a synagogue center, merging social, educational and religious practices |
| 185 | U.S. Army Military Ocean Terminal | U.S. Army Military Ocean Terminal | September 23, 1983 (#83001702) | 58th-65th St. and 2nd Ave. 40°38′41″N 74°01′40″W | Sunset Park | |
| 186 | US Post Office-Flatbush Station | US Post Office-Flatbush Station | November 17, 1988 (#88002460) | 2273 Church Ave. 40°39′02″N 73°57′24″W | Flatbush | part of the US Post Offices in New York State, 1858-1943, TR |
| 187 | US Post Office-Kensington | US Post Office-Kensington | November 17, 1988 (#88002461) | 421 McDonald Ave. 40°38′37″N 73°58′47″W | Kensington | part of the US Post Offices in New York State, 1858-1943, TR |
| 188 | US Post Office-Metropolitan Station | US Post Office-Metropolitan Station | November 17, 1988 (#88002462) | 47 Debevoise St. 40°42′06″N 73°56′30″W | Williamsburg | part of the US Post Offices in New York State, 1858-1943, TR |
| 189 | US Post Office-Parkville Station | US Post Office-Parkville Station | November 17, 1988 (#88002463) | 6618 20th Ave. 40°36′56″N 73°59′15″W | Bensonhurst | part of the US Post Offices in New York State, 1858-1943, TR |
| 190 | Joost Van Nuyse House | Joost Van Nuyse House | June 9, 2006 (#06000477) | 1128 E. 34th St. 40°37′41″N 73°56′38″W | Flatlands | |
| 191 | Wallabout Historic District | Wallabout Historic District | April 27, 2011 (#11000229) | 73-83 & 123-141 Clermont Ave.; 74-148 Clinton Ave.; 381-387, 403-421 & 455-461 Myrtle Ave.; 69-149 Vanderbilt Ave. 40°41′40″N 73°58′12″W | Wallabout | Surviving frame houses from the 17th century; one of the oldest areas of the borough. |
| 192 | Wallabout Industrial Historic District | Wallabout Industrial Historic District | August 7, 2012 (#12000479) | Clinton, Flushing, Grand, Park, Washington, & Waverly Aves., Hall, & Ryerson Sts. 40°41′49″N 73°58′01″W | Wallabout | |
| 193 | Weir Greenhouse | Weir Greenhouse | May 10, 1984 (#84002487) | 750-751-5th Ave. 40°39′32″N 73°59′47″W | Sunset Park | |
| 194 | Williamsburg Houses | Williamsburg Houses | April 22, 2021 (#100006484) | 134 Bushwick Ave., 214 Graham Ave., 178 Leonard St., 108, 160, 176, 196 Maujer St., 93, 195, 219 Scholes St., 101, 106, 125, 180 Stagg Walk, 123, 143, 164, 188, 200, 222 Ten Eyck Walk; 40°42′36″N 73°56′31″W | Williamsburg | A large public housing complex |
| 195 | Williamsburgh Savings Bank | Williamsburgh Savings Bank | April 9, 1980 (#80002642) | 175 Broadway; 40°42′36″N 73°57′42″W | Williamsburg | |
| 196 | Willoughby-Suydam Historic District | Willoughby-Suydam Historic District | September 30, 1983 (#83001782) | Suydam St., Willoughby, St. Nicholas, and Wyckoff Aves. 40°42′21″N 73°55′14″W | Bushwick | part of the Ridgewood MRA |
| 197 | Wilson Avenue Subway Station (Dual System BMT) | Wilson Avenue Subway Station (Dual System BMT) | July 6, 2005 (#05000681) | Chauncey St. at Wilson Ave. 40°41′19″N 73°54′17″W | Bushwick | Subway station (L train); part of the New York City Subway System MPS |
| 198 | Pieter Wyckoff House | Pieter Wyckoff House | December 24, 1967 (#67000013) | 5902 Canarsie Lane; 40°38′40″N 73°55′16″W | Flatbush | |
| 199 | Wyckoff-Bennett Homestead | Wyckoff-Bennett Homestead | December 24, 1974 (#74001253) | 1669 E. 22nd St. 40°36′39″N 73°57′06″W | Flatlands | |
| 200 | Young Israel of Flatbush | Young Israel of Flatbush | February 12, 2010 (#10000011) | 1012 Avenue I 40°37′37″N 73°57′57″W | Flatbush | |

== See also ==
- Statewide: National Register of Historic Places listings in New York
- Citywide: Manhattan, Queens, Staten Island, Bronx
- List of New York City Designated Landmarks in Brooklyn
