= Public School 65K =

- U.S. National Register of Historic Places
- New York City Landmark
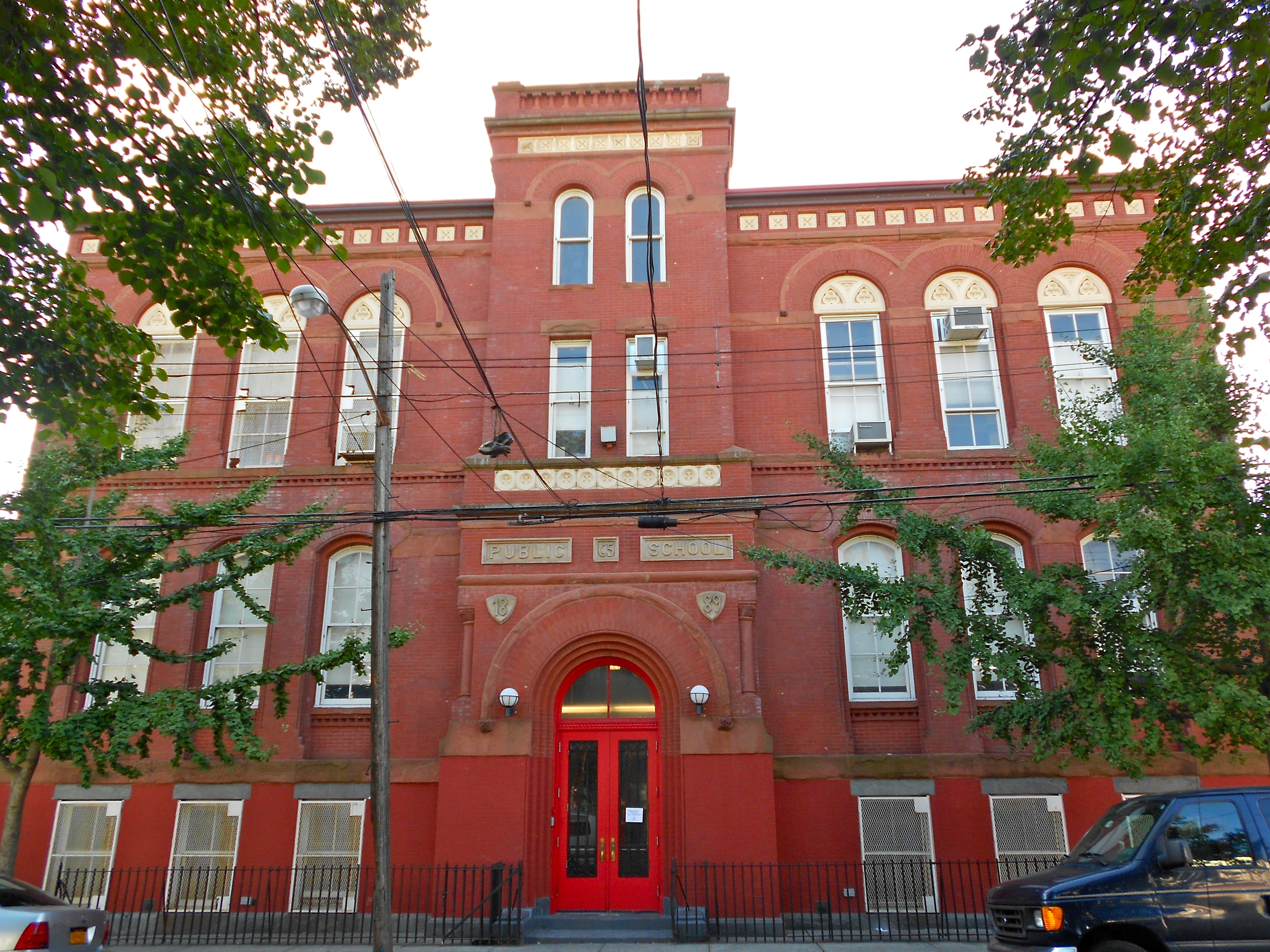
- In 2013

- Location within New York City Location within New York Location within the United States
- Location: 158 Richmond St., New York, New York
- Coordinates: 40°40′59″N 73°52′40″W
- Area: less than one acre
- Built: 1870
- Architect: Naughton, James W.
- Architectural style: Romanesque, Romanesque Revival
- NRHP reference No.: 81000408

Significant dates
- Added to NRHP: December 10, 1981
- Designated NYCL: February 3, 1981

Public School 65K is a historic school building located in Cypress Hills, Brooklyn, New York, New York. It was originally built in 1870 and significantly expanded in 1889 to designs by James W. Naughton. It is a two-story, brick building on a stone base in the Romanesque Revival style. It features a slightly projecting central tower and terra cotta decorative details.

It was listed on the National Register of Historic Places in 1981.

== See also ==
- List of New York City Landmarks
- National Register of Historic Places listings in Kings County, New York
