= Public School 71K =

- U.S. National Register of Historic Places
- New York City Landmark
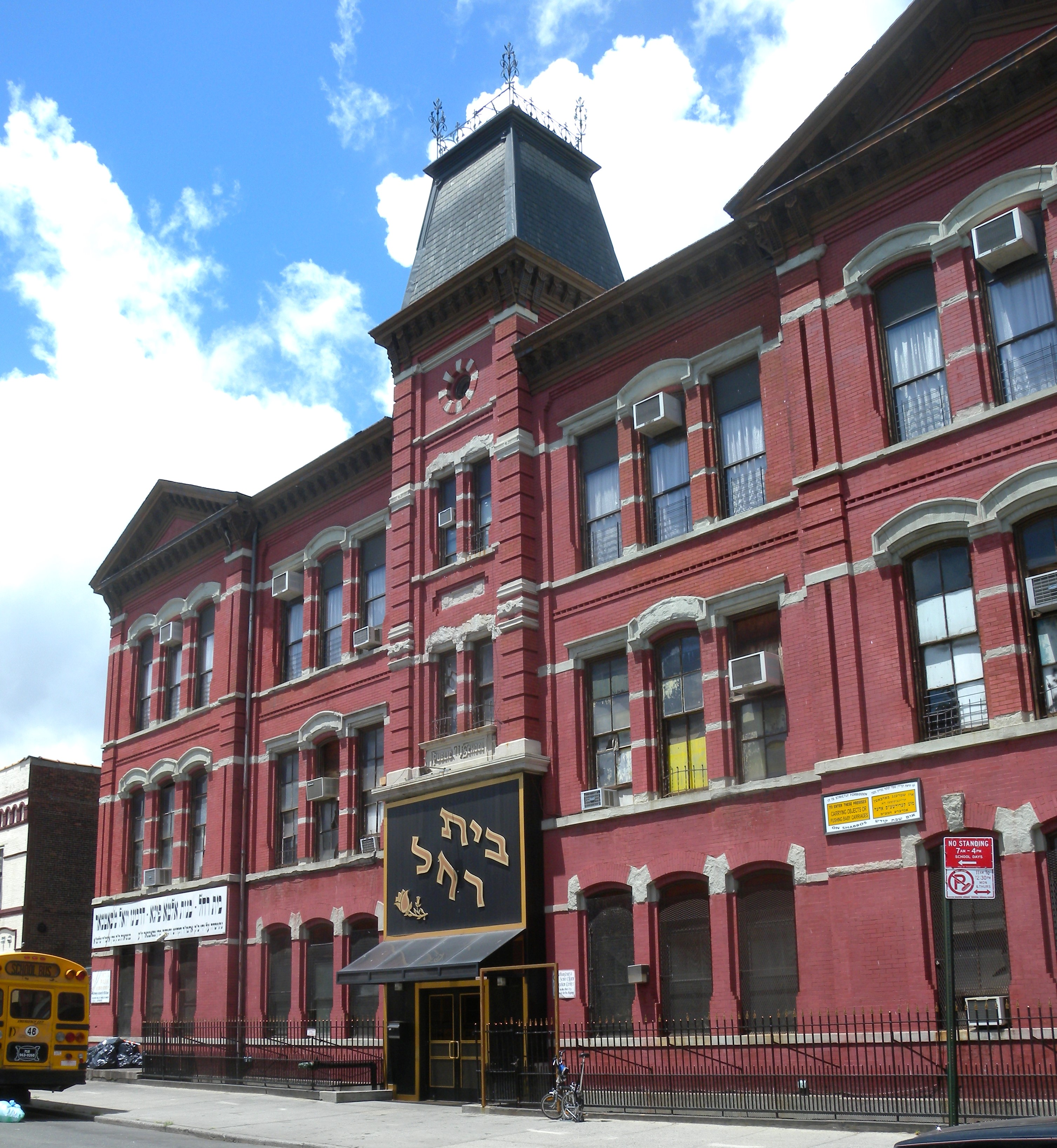
- East-facing entrance of Beis Rochel Satmar School in 2010

- Location within New York City
- Location: 119 Heyward St., New York, New York
- Coordinates: 40°42′6″N 73°57′24″W
- Area: less than one acre
- Built: 1888
- Architect: James W. Naughton
- Architectural style: Second Empire
- NRHP reference No.: 82001181

Significant dates
- Added to NRHP: November 4, 1982
- Designated NYCL: February 3, 1981

Public School 71K is a historic school building located in Williamsburg, Brooklyn, New York City. It contains the Beis Rochel School, a Satmar girls-only private Jewish school. It was built in 1888–1889 to designs by James W. Naughton. It is a symmetrical three story, brick building with stone trim in the French Second Empire style. It features a tall central tower with a high mansard roof and original iron cresting.

It was listed on the National Register of Historic Places in 1982.

This building has an exact twin in Bedford-Stuyvesant, Brooklyn: the Excellence Charter School at 225 Patchen Ave.

== See also ==
- List of New York City Landmarks
- National Register of Historic Places listings in Kings County, New York
