= South Bushwick Reformed Church =

Church in Brooklyn, New York

- South Bushwick Reformed Protestant Dutch Church Complex
- U.S. National Register of Historic Places
- New York State Register of Historic Places
- New York City Landmark
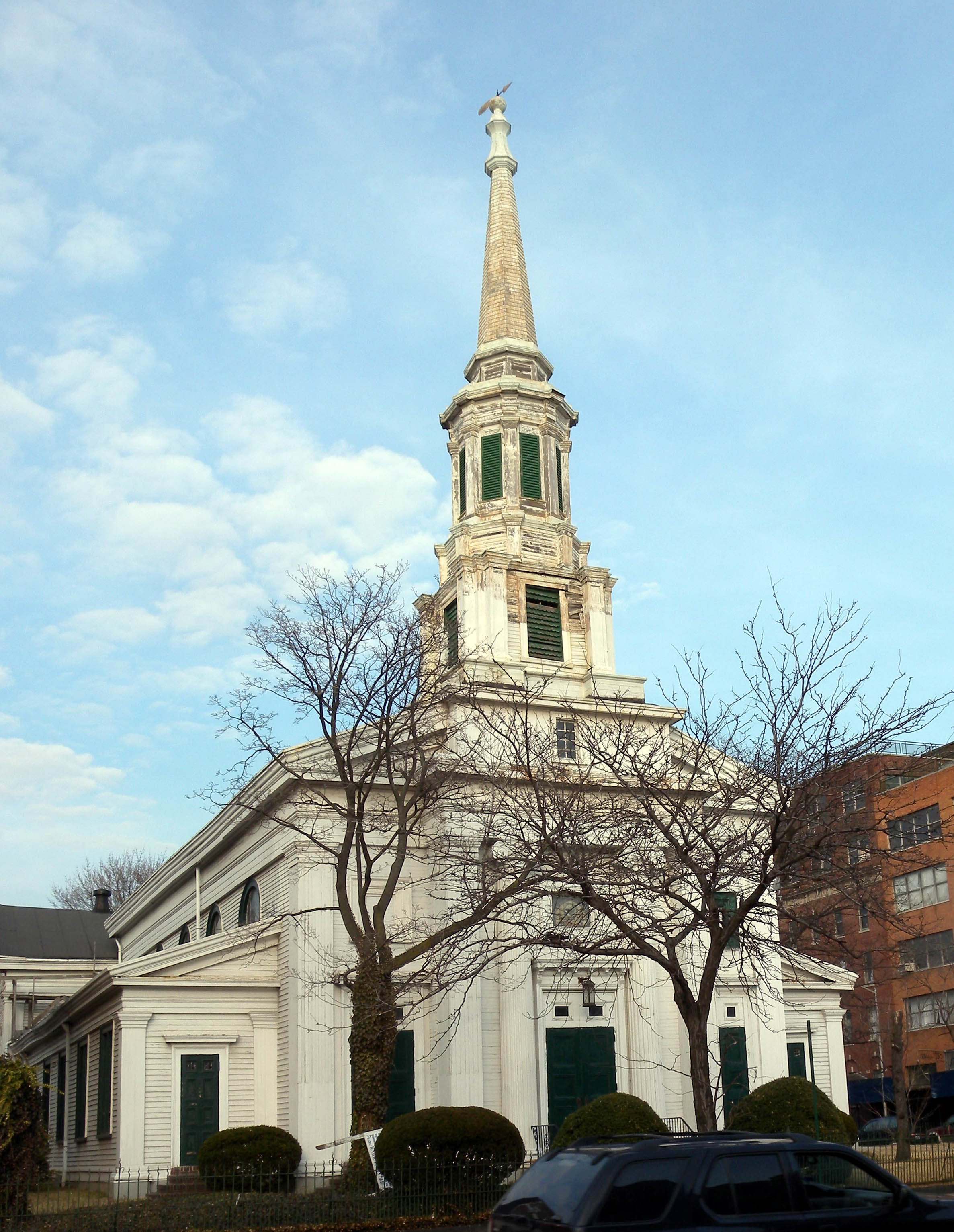
- Seen in February 2009

- Location within New York City Location within New York Location within the United States
- Location: 855 Bushwick Ave., Brooklyn, New York
- Coordinates: 40°41′39″N 73°55′34″W
- Built: 1852
- Architects: Messrs. Morgan, J.J. Buck
- Architectural style: Classical Revival, Greek Revival
- NRHP reference No.: 82001182
- NYSRHP No.: 04701.000171
- NYCL No.: 0168

Significant dates
- Added to NRHP: November 4, 1982
- Designated NYSRHP: September 30, 1982
- Designated NYCL: March 19, 1968

South Bushwick Reformed Church, also known as the "White Church", was a historic Dutch Reformed church in Bushwick, Brooklyn, New York. Listed on the National Register of Historic Places in 1982 as the South Bushwick Reformed Protestant Dutch Church Complex, the complex consists of the church and attached Sunday School building. The original church building, dating from 1853, burned down in 2026 and is planned to be rebuilt.

== History ==
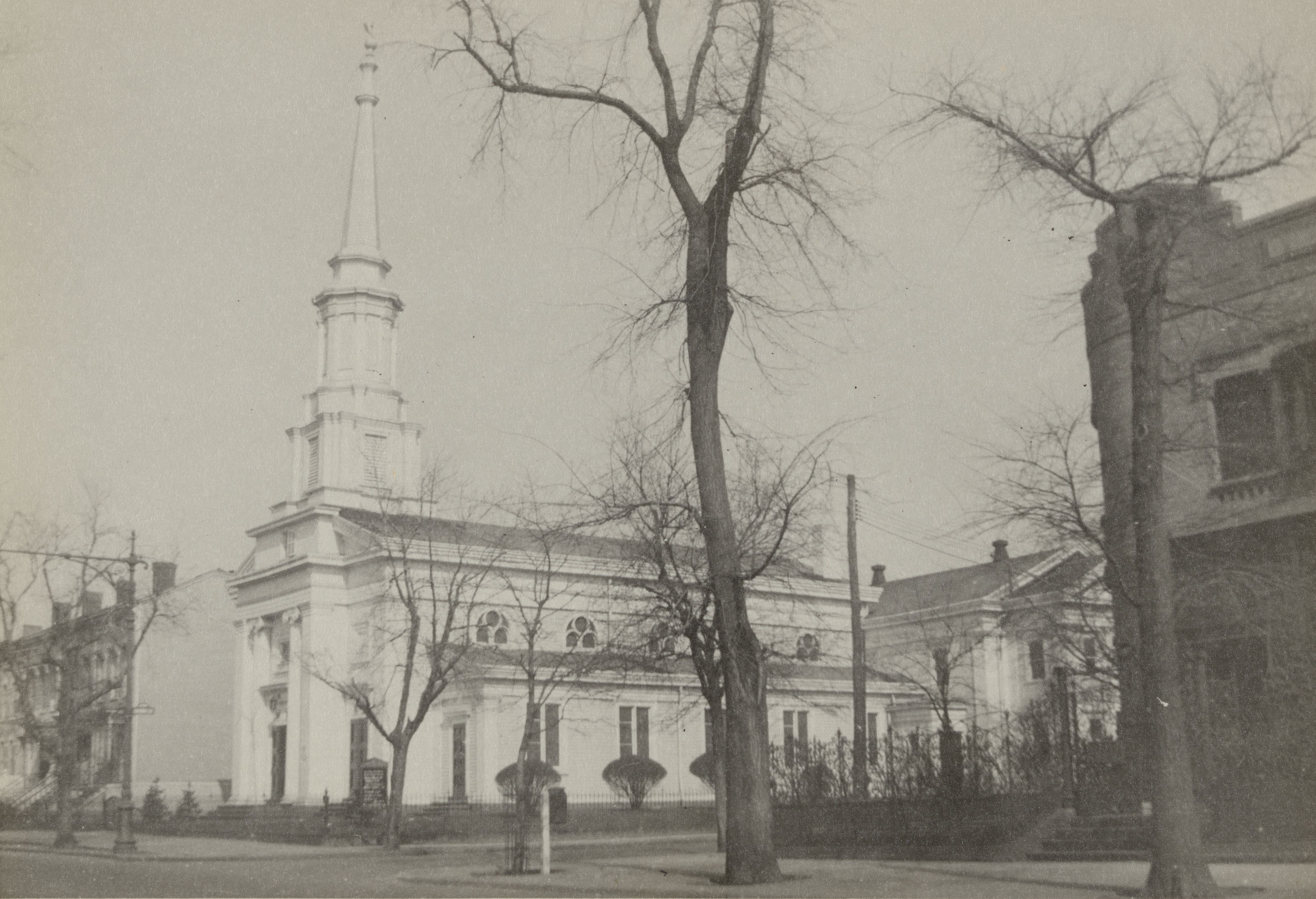
1923 photograph of the church by Eugene Armbruster

The church was organized in 1851 by members of the Bushwick Reformed Church that dates back to 1654. Himrod St. was named after South Bushwick's first pastor. The church was a two-story frame, clapboard-sided building finished in 1853. Its design combined Greek Revival and Gibbsian classical styles. The Greek Revival entrance portico featured two giant fluted Ionic order columns. Above the entrance portico was the tower with a square base and octagonal lantern and spire.

The Rev. Samuel Merrill Woodbridge (1819–1905), a Reformed pastor, and later author and theology professor, served this congregation from 1841 to 1849 after receiving his degree from New Brunswick Theological Seminary.

In the early afternoon of June 19, 2026, the church building caught fire in what became a three-alarm fire that caused extensive damage, including causing the steeple to collapse. Due to the extensive fire damage, the entire building is expected to be demolished. In June 2026, South Bushwick Reformed Church officials and local elected officials, including Rev. Dr. James E. Steward II and Council member Sandy Nurse, pledged to rebuild the church. Nurse said: "We've done so much over the past four years to make sure that this church can survive for another 100 years; to see this happen is so tragic". As of July 2026, the Fire Department of New York was investigating the fire as an arson.

== See also ==
- List of New York City Landmarks
- National Register of Historic Places listings in Kings County, New York
