= Public School 9 and Public School 9 Annex =

- Public School 9 and Public School 9 Annex ("Public School 111 and Public School 9 Annex")
- U.S. National Register of Historic Places
- U.S. Historic district – Contributing property
- New York State Register of Historic Places
- New York City Landmark
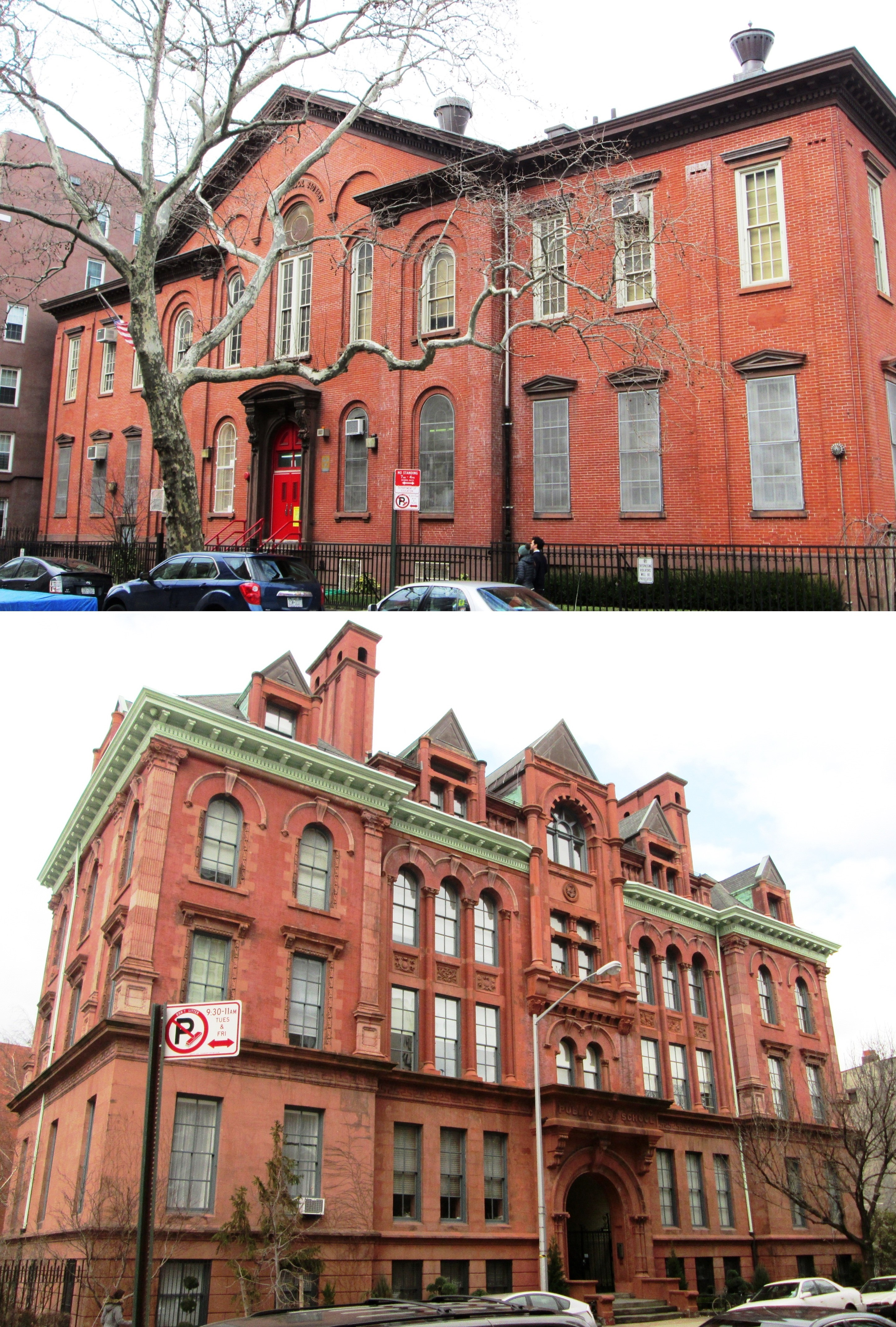
- Public School 9 (top) and Public School 9 Annex (bottom) (2013)

- Location within New York City Location within New York Location within the United States
- Location: 249 (P.S. 9) and 251 (Annex) Sterling Place; Brooklyn, New York City
- Coordinates: 40°40′34″N 73°58′11″W
- Built: P.S. 9: 1867-68, 1887; Annex: 1895
- Architects: Samuel B. Leonard; James W. Naughton
- Architectural style: P.S. 9: Early Romanesque; Annex: Romanesque Revival with Renaissance Revival ornamentation
- Part of: Prospect Heights Historic District (Expansion) (ID16000018)
- NRHP reference No.: 81000407
- NYSRHP No.: 04701.002496, 04701.002497
- NYCL No.: 0975

Significant dates
- Added to NRHP: December 14, 1981
- Designated NYSRHP: November 5, 1981
- Designated NYCL: January 10, 1978

Public School 9 and Public School 9 Annex are two historic school buildings located at 227 and 279 Sterling Place, respectively, at Vanderbilt Avenue in the Prospect Heights neighborhood of Brooklyn, New York City.

Public School 9 consists of a central, two-story gabled section flanked by two-story wings. The central section dates to 1867–68 and was designed by Samuel B. Leonard in the Early Romanesque Revival style. The two wings were added in 1887 and were designed by James W. Naughton. The school was originally Public School 9, later becoming Public School 111, and currently M.S. 340 North Star Academy.

Public School 9 Annex was necessitated by the continued population growth of Prospect Heights, which caused overcrowding in the original school. It was designed by James W. Naughton and built in 1895. It is a three-story, H-shaped, brick building crowned by gable dormer windows. The Romanesque Revival building incorporates Renaissance Revival style details. The building has been converted into condominium apartments under the name "P.S. 9".

Both buildings were separately designated New York City Landmarks in 1978, as "Public School 9" and "Public School 9 Annex" and were listed together on the National Register of Historic Places in 1981, as "Public School 111 and Public School 9 Annex"

== See also ==
- List of New York City Designated Landmarks in Brooklyn
- National Register of Historic Places listings in Brooklyn
- Sarah Smith Garnet Elementary School
