= 75th Police Precinct Station House =

- U.S. National Register of Historic Places
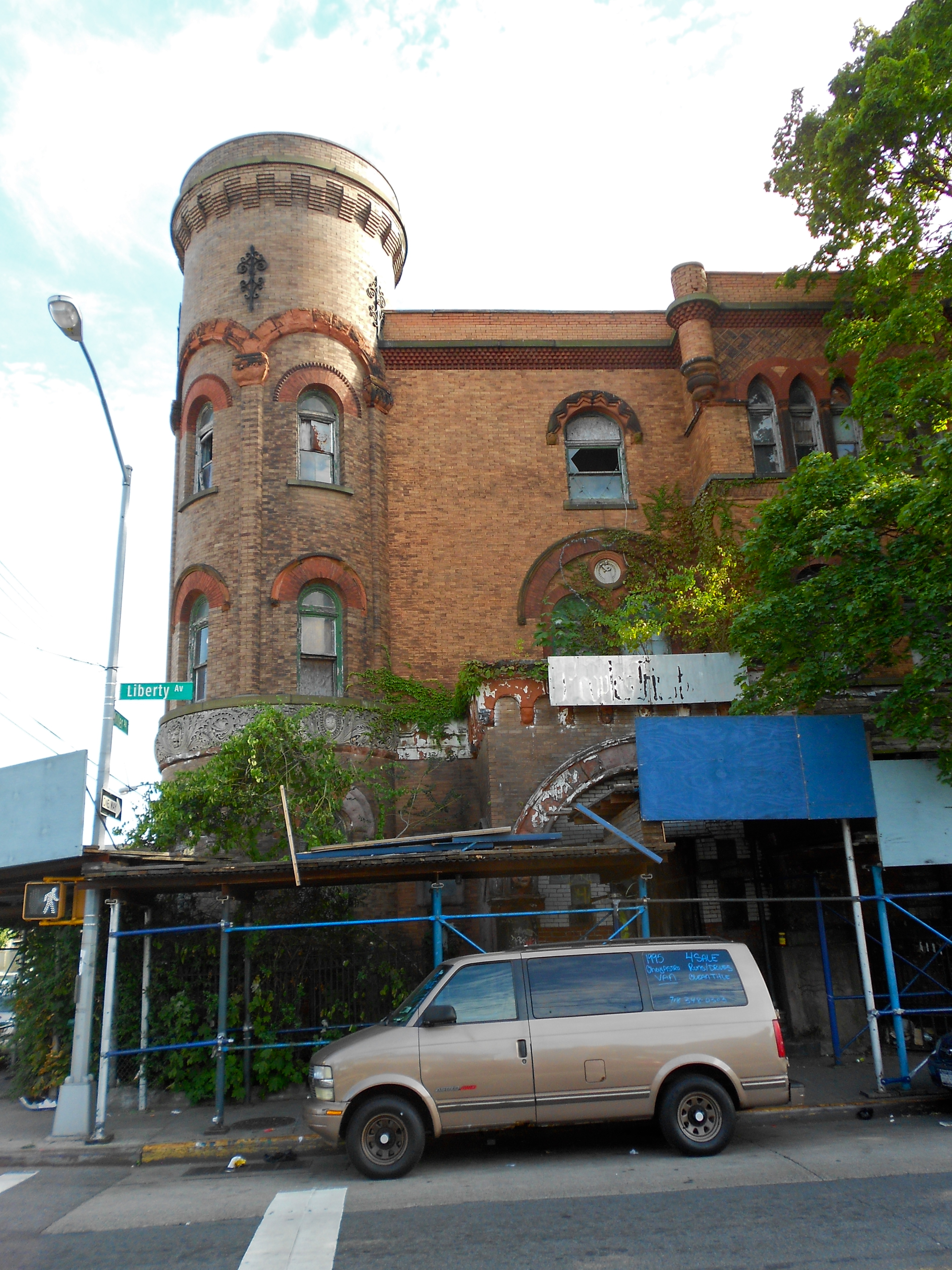

- Location within New York City Location within New York Location within the United States
- Location: 484 Liberty Avenue, New Lots, Brooklyn, New York 11207, USA
- Coordinates: 40°40′29″N 73°53′33″W
- Area: less than one acre
- Built: 1886
- Architect: Gruwe, Emile M.
- Architectural style: Romanesque
- NRHP reference No.: 07000952
- Added to NRHP: September 10, 2007

75th Police Precinct Station House is a historic police station located in New Lots, Brooklyn, New York. It was built in 1886 and is a three-story, yellow brick building above a sandstone foundation and watertable in the Romanesque Revival style. It features a round corner tower and Norman-inspired projecting main entrance portico. The stable is a two-story brick building connected to the station house by a one-story brick passage. It ceased use as a police station in 1973 and later used by a local church.

It was listed on the National Register of Historic Places in 2007.

== Gallery ==
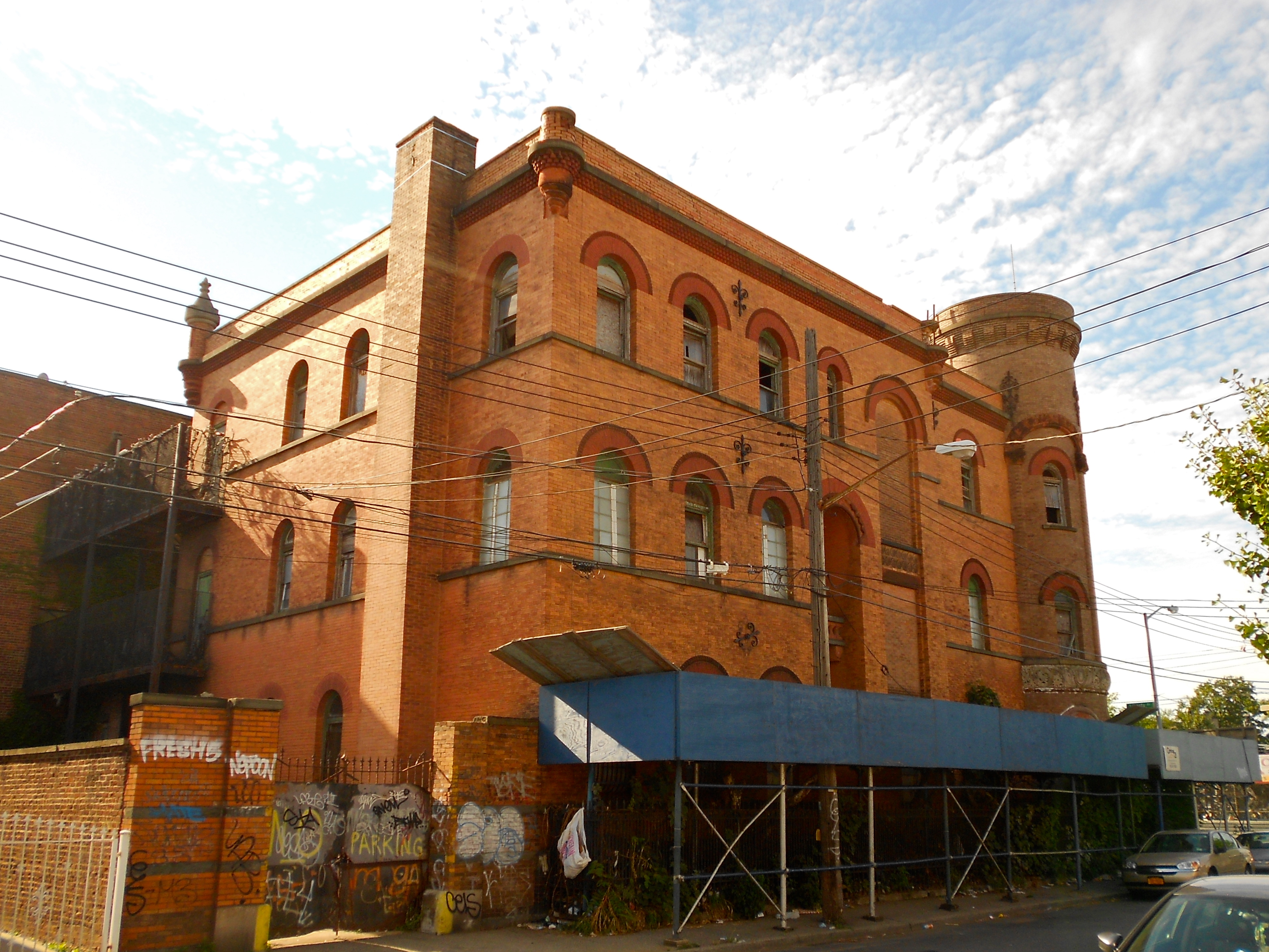
overview

== See also ==
- National Register of Historic Places listings in Brooklyn
