= Public School 108 =

- U.S. National Register of Historic Places
- New York City Landmark
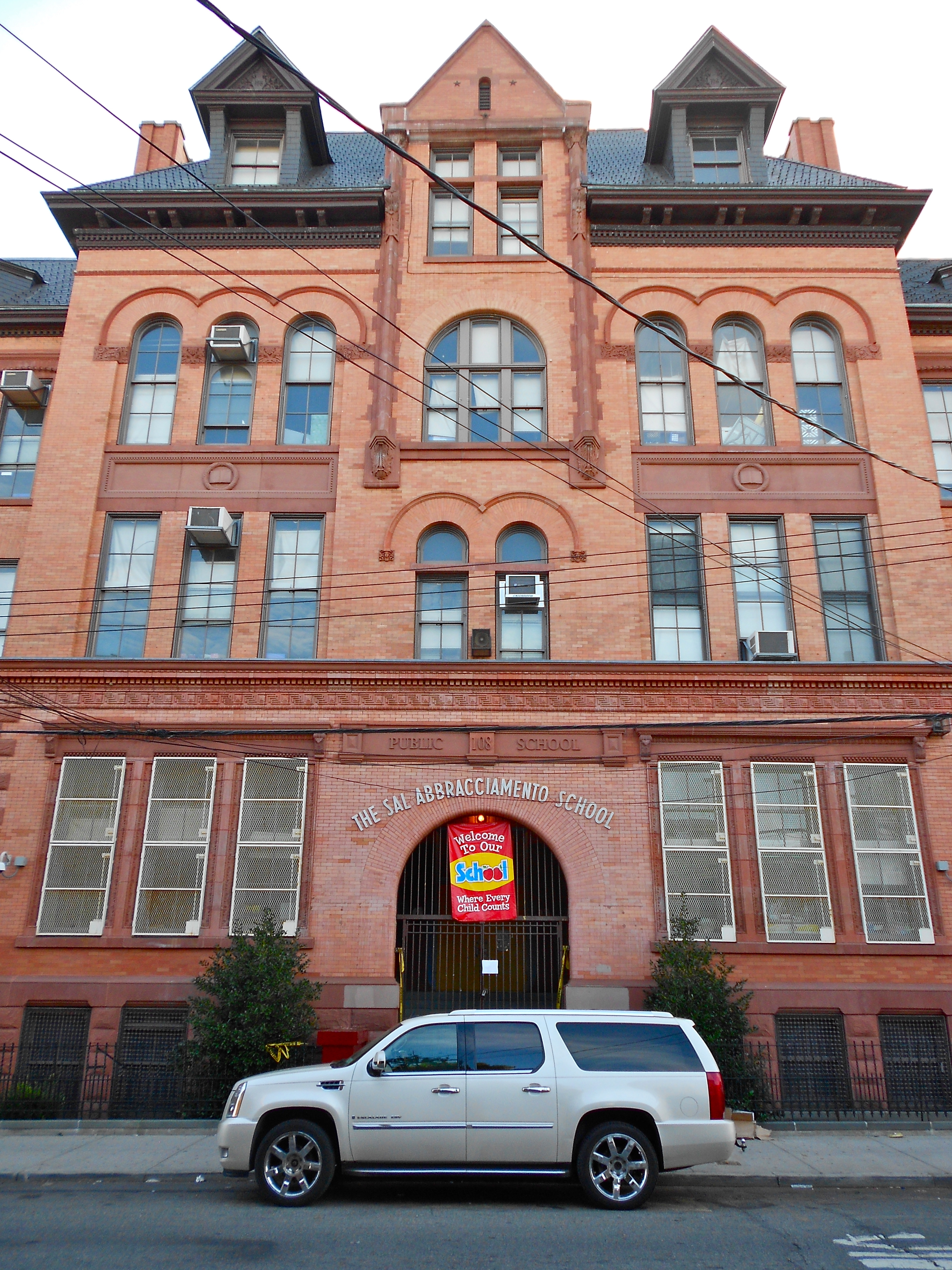
- In 2013

- Location within New York City Location within New York Location within the United States
- Location: 200 Linwood St., New York, New York
- Coordinates: 40°40′52″N 73°53′5″W
- Area: less than one acre (0.40 ha)
- Built: 1895; 131 years ago
- Architect: Naughton, James W.
- Architectural style: Romanesque, Richardsonian Romanesque
- NRHP reference No.: 82003363

Significant dates
- Added to NRHP: December 10, 1982
- Designated NYCL: February 3, 1981

Public School 108 is a historic school building located in Cypress Hills, Brooklyn, New York, New York. It was designed by James W. Naughton and built in 1895. It is a three-story, brick building trimmed in Lake Superior sandstone in the Romanesque Revival style. It has an attic fourth floor pierced by dormer windows. It consists of a seven bay central section connected to three bay wide end pavilions by recessed wings.

It was listed on the National Register of Historic Places in 1982. The building continues to house an elementary school, now known as P.S. 108 Sal Abbracciamento School.

== See also ==
- List of New York City Landmarks
- National Register of Historic Places listings in Kings County, New York
