= Shirley Zussman =

American sex therapist (1914–2021)

- Born: July 23, 1914; Manhattan, New York, U.S.
- Died: December 4, 2021 (aged 107); Manhattan, New York, U.S.
- Education: Smith College; New York School of Social Work at Columbia University; Teachers College, Columbia University
- Occupation: Sex therapist

Shirley Edith Zussman (née Dlugasch; July 23, 1914 – December 4, 2021) was an American sex therapist based in New York City. She was Jewish.

== Early life and education ==
Zussman was born Shirley Edith Dlugasch on July 23, 1914, on the Lower East Side of Manhattan. Zussman's father, Louis Dlugasch, was a doctor, and her mother, Sara, was a surgical nurse. She was raised in Brooklyn, and attended Girls High School.

Zussman received a bachelor's degree in psychology at Smith College in 1934, and a master in social work in 1937 from the New York School of Social Work at Columbia University. She received her doctorate in education in 1969 from Teachers College, Columbia University. Zussman was supervised through her graduate dissertation by Margaret Mead.

== Career ==
Zussman and her husband, Dr. Leon Zussman, a gynecologist, trained at the Masters and Johnson Institute in the 1960s. The two became directors of the Human Sexuality Center of the Jewish-Hillside Medical Center on Long Island in New York. Their practice centered on communication and developed physical and psychological exercises for their patients. In 1979, they wrote Getting Together: A Guide to Sexual Enrichment for Couples which was wide-ranging and compassionate. She later had a practice on East 79th Street on the Upper East Side of Manhattan.

She was a two-term President of the American Association of Sexuality Educators, Counselors and Therapists, and co-director of the Human Sexuality Center of Zucker Hillside Hospital. Zussman was also past Director of the Association for Male Sexual Dysfunction.

Ruth Westheimer, the German-American sex therapist and talk show host known popularly as Dr. Ruth, studied under Zussman when she taught at Columbia University.

In her later years, in her practice Zussman often saw people much younger than herself; at age 99 she had patients in their twenties. She continued to practice as a sex therapist until she was 105 years old.

== Personal life ==
Shirley was married to Leon Zussman (1909–1980). They had two children, a son, Marc Zussman, and a daughter, Carol Sun.

Zussman died on December 4, 2021, at the age of 107.

== Books and articles ==
- Zussman, Leon, Shirley Zussman, and Jeremy Brecher. Getting Together: A Guide to Sexual Enrichment for Couples. New York: Morrow, 1979. ISBN 9780688033835
- Zussman, Leon, and Shirley Zussman. "The treatment of sexual dysfunction: Some theoretical considerations." Journal of Contemporary Psychotherapy: On the Cutting Edge of Modern Developments in Psychotherapy (1976).
- Whitehead, E. D., Klyde, B. J., Zussman, S., & Salkin, P. (1990). Diagnostic evaluation of impotence. Postgraduate medicine, 88(2), 123–136.
- Zussman, L., Zussman, S., Sunley, R., & Bjornson, E. (1981). Sexual response after hysterectomy-oophorectomy: recent studies and reconsideration of psychogenesis. American journal of obstetrics and gynecology, 140(7), 725–729.
