= Nassau Brewing Company =

- U.S. National Register of Historic Places
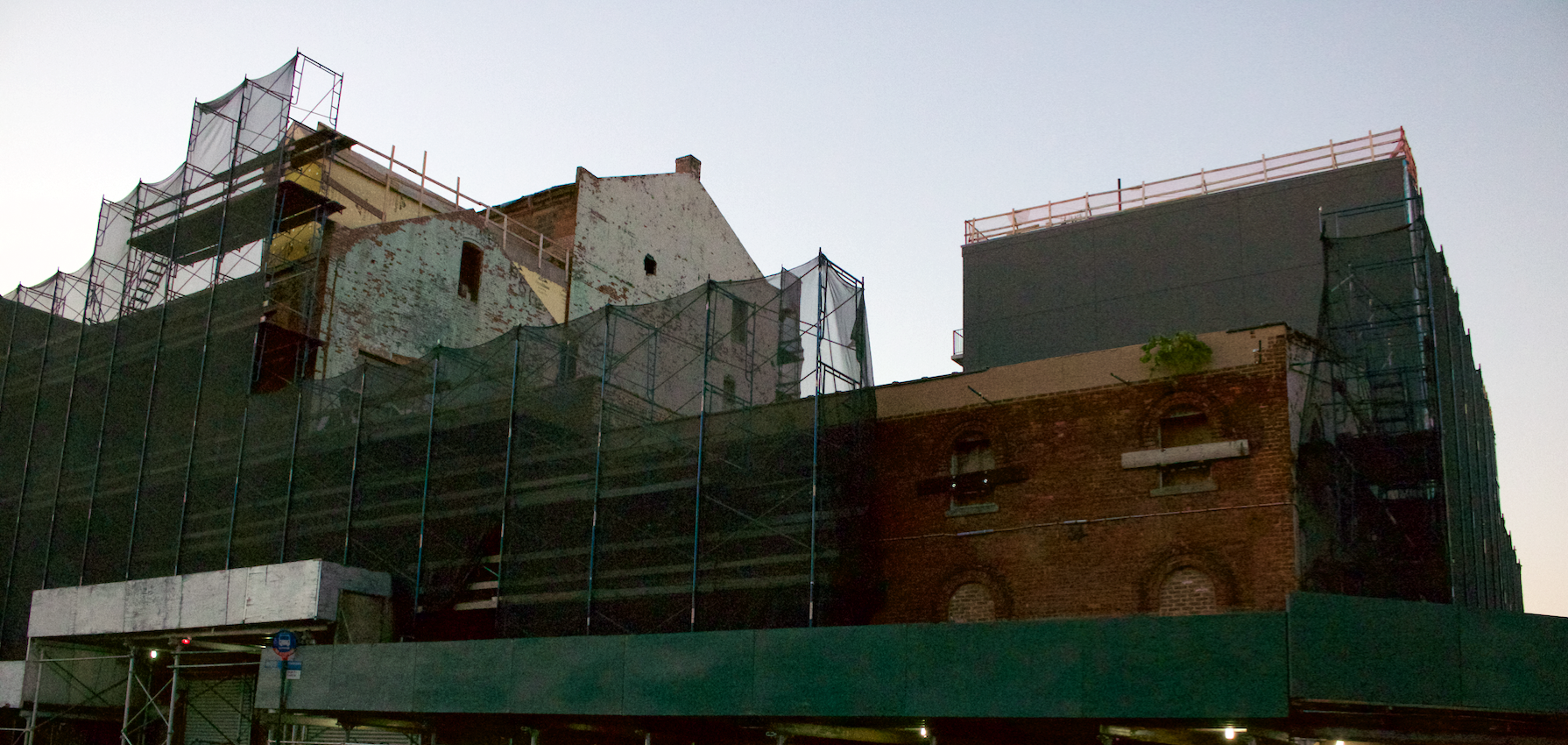

- Location within New York City
- Location: 925-949 Bergen & 1024 Dean Sts., Brooklyn, New York
- Coordinates: 40°40′37″N 73°57′30″W
- Area: 0.97 acres (0.39 ha)
- Built: c. 1865-1866, c. 1885
- Architect: Engelhardt, Philip; Stoll, Charles; Platte, John
- Architectural style: Rundbogenstil, Romanesque Revival
- NRHP reference No.: 14000873
- Added to NRHP: October 22, 2014

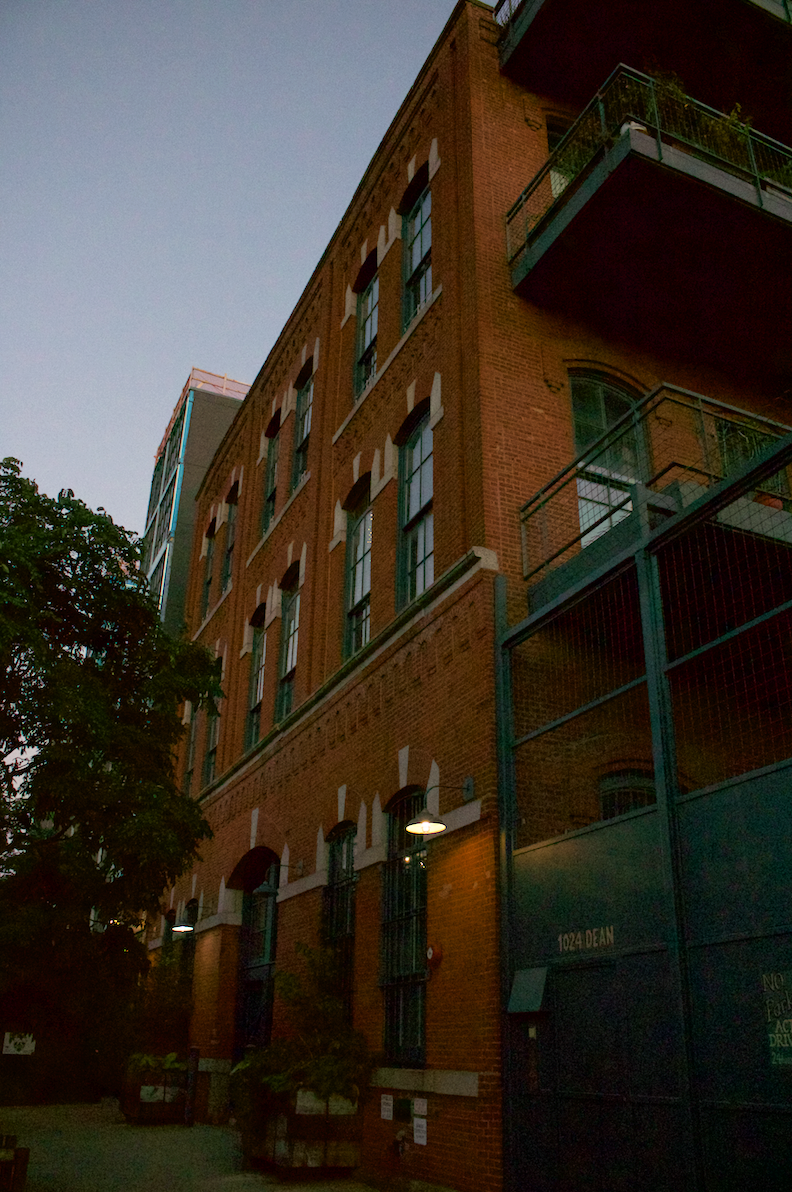
Exterior of the building

Nassau Brewing Company, also known as the Budweiser Brewing Company of Brooklyn and Bedford Brewery, is a historic brewery apartment complex located in the Crown Heights neighborhood of Brooklyn, New York City, US. It consists of two remaining industrial buildings dating from the 1860s to the 1880s and are in the Rundbogenstil and Romanesque Revival style. The brick buildings are two to six stories and form an "L"-shape. The buildings feature substantial underground brick vaults originally constructed for the aging of lager beer at near-freezing temperatures. The brewery closed in 1916. The earlier sections are vacant and the 1880s elements were rehabilitated as apartments and offices in the 2000s.

It was listed on the National Register of Historic Places in 2014.

Its owners declared bankruptcy in 2021. Dushinsky’s Rabsky Group won a bankruptcy auction to buy the Nassau Brewing redevelopment at 945 Bergen Street in 2024, with a bid of $18.8 million.

== See also ==
- National Register of Historic Places listings in Brooklyn
