= Grecian Shelter =

- U.S. National Register of Historic Places
- New York State Register of Historic Places
- New York City Landmark
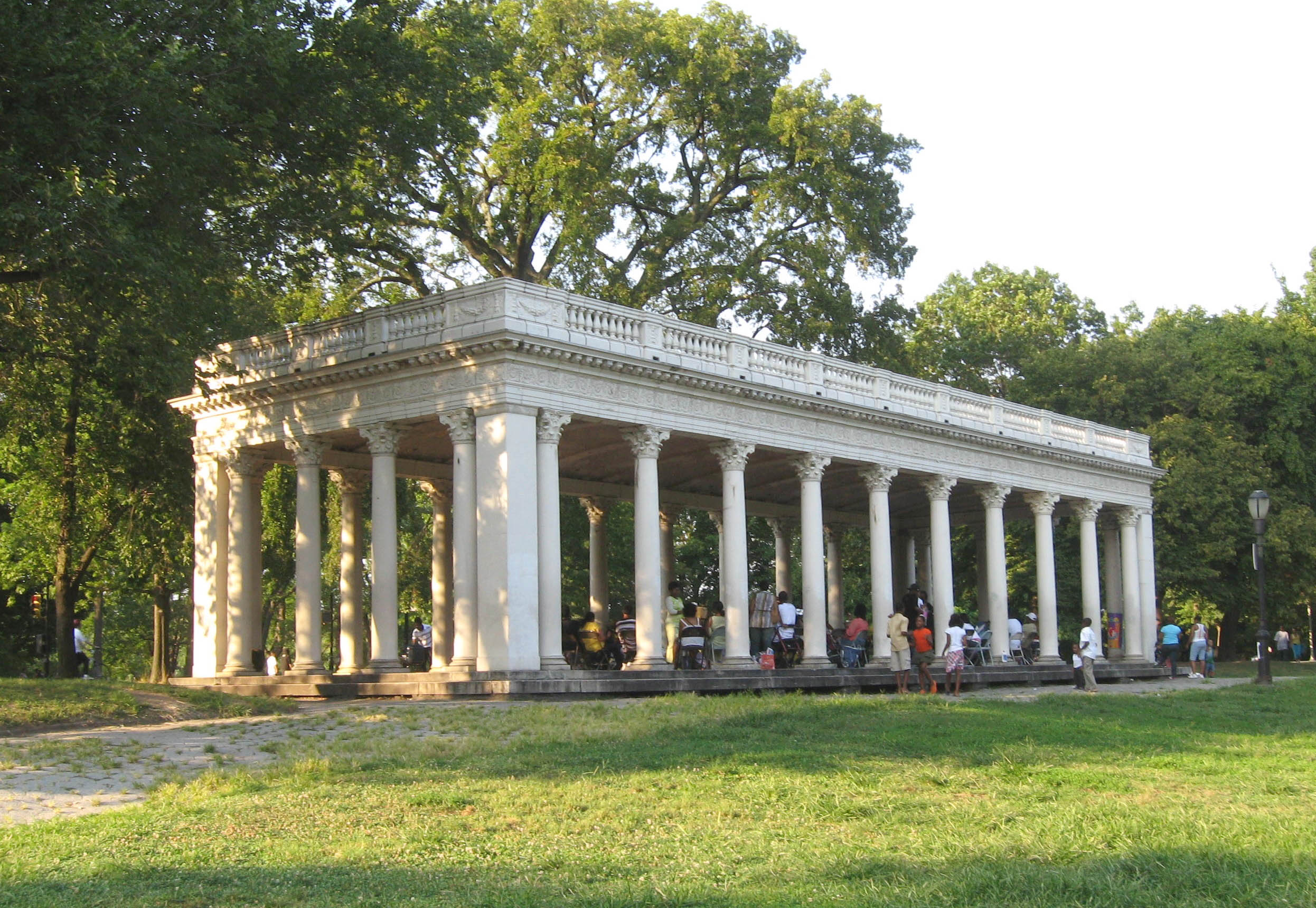

- Location within New York City Location within New York Location within the United States
- Location: Prospect Park near Parkside Ave., New York, New York
- Coordinates: 40°39′13″N 73°58′3″W
- Built: 1905
- Architect: McKim, Mead & White
- NRHP reference No.: 72000852
- NYSRHP No.: 04701.002837
- NYCL No.: 0154

Significant dates
- Added to NRHP: January 20, 1972
- Designated NYSRHP: June 23, 1980
- Designated NYCL: December 10, 1968

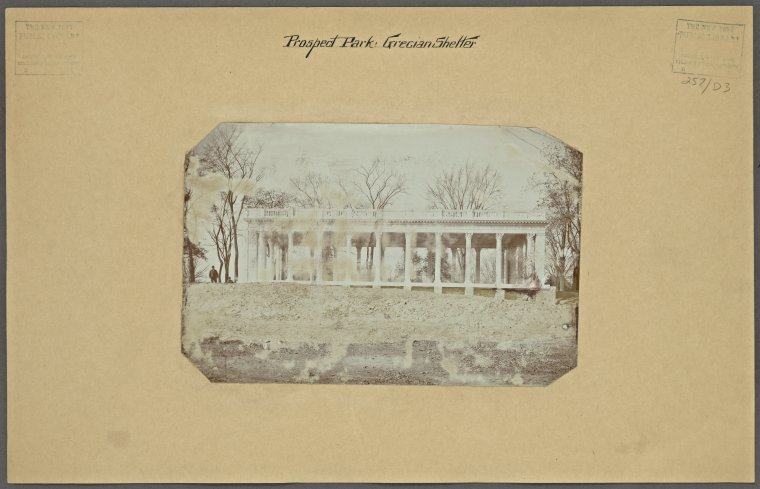
Early 20th Century

The Grecian Shelter, designated a Croquet Shelter on the original plans of Prospect Park, is also referred to as the Prospect Park Peristyle or Peristyle. The building, a peristyle with Corinthian columns, is situated near the southern edge of Prospect Park in Brooklyn, New York. Constructed by McKim, Mead and White in 1905, this peristyle was built on the site of the 1860s-era Promenade Drive Shelter along the southwest shore of the Prospect Park Lake. The Prospect Park Peristyle is designed in the Renaissance architectural style. It consists of a raised platform located two steps above ground level; the platform is covered by a rectangular colonnade with 28 Corinthian marble columns, each with square piers. An entablature of terracotta runs atop the structure. The building was constructed as a temporary refuge from rain and sun.

Grecian Shelter was rehabilitated in 1966 and listed on the National Register of Historic Places in 1972. The peristyle is also a New York City designated landmark, having been declared as such on December 10, 1968.

== See also ==
- List of New York City Landmarks
- National Register of Historic Places listings in Kings County, New York
- Peristyle
