= Girls' High School (Brooklyn) =

Public school in New York City

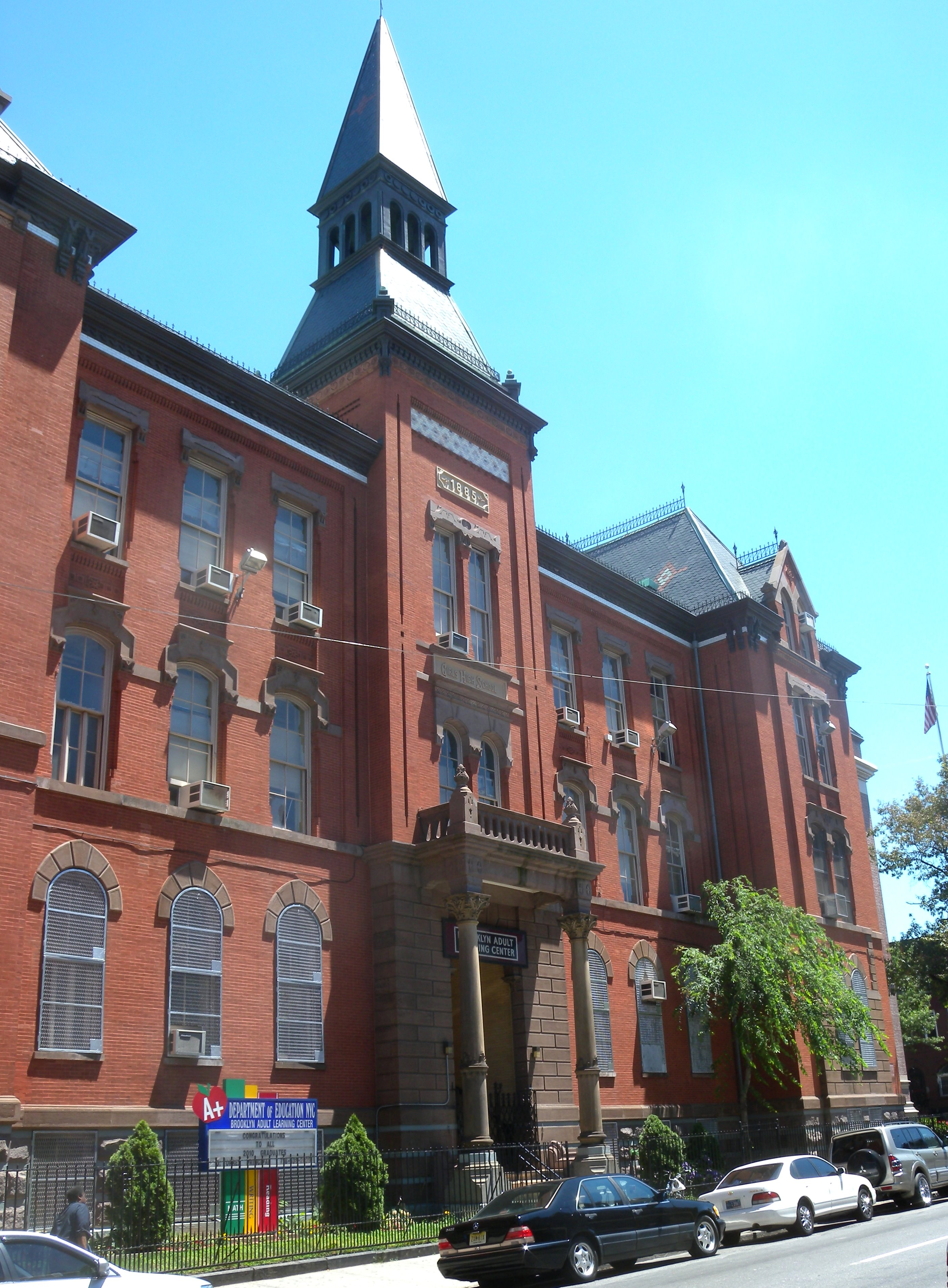

Location
- 40.6815°N 73.9496°W

Information
- Established: 1891
- Closed: 1975
- Gender: Girls

Girls' High School was a public high school in Brooklyn, New York. It was in a historically and architecturally notable building at 475 Nostrand Avenue in the Bedford–Stuyvesant neighborhood. It was built in 1886. In 1975 it merged with Boys High School; the new school, the Boys and Girls High School, moved to Fulton Street and Utica Avenue.

== History ==
Girls' High School grew out of Brooklyn's first public secondary school, the Central Grammar School (sometimes known as the Central School or the Central High School), which was founded in 1878 and located at Court and Livingston Streets. The first principal of the Central Grammar School was Dr. Robert F. Leighton. The school's enrollment outgrew its quarters and it was determined that a new building was needed. By the time of the building's completion in 1886, however, the student population had grown so large that only the girl students moved into the new building, under the principalship of Calvin Patterson. The boy students remained at the old building under Principal Alec G. McAllister. In 1889, Girls' High officially adopted "Labor et Honore" as their motto, following the suggestion of Mrs. Lucy T. Lewis. In 1891, the girls' section officially became Girls' High School and the boys' section became Boys' High School, which moved into its own new building in 1892.

Under Principal Patterson, there were strict rules at Girls' High, including no running, no athletics, no dancing and no parties. In 1902, Calvin Patterson died. He was succeeded by Dr. William L. Felter. Under Felter's leadership, clubs and leisure activities were established at the school. In 1908, longtime teacher Rowena K. Keyes composed the school song. Dr. Felter retired in 1933 and was succeeded by Maurice E. Rogalin, who served as principal until 1936. Rowena K. Keyes was principal from 1937-1943, followed by Edith M. Ward (1944-1946), Hortense H. Levisohn (1946-1954), and Irvin Sulo Hecht (1954-1964), with Jordan Hale serving as acting principal from 1956-1957.

In 1975 the school merged with Boys High School and moved to a new building at Fulton Street and Utica Avenue as the Boys and Girls High School.

== Building ==
The building was designed by James W. Naughton, Superintendent of Buildings for the Board of Education of the City of Brooklyn. It is regarded as a "masterpiece" of Victorian Gothic style, blending Gothic Revival and French Second Empire styles, the Second Empire influence is visible in the mansard roof, the Gothic influence in the pointed arch windows. The building, which was intended to house the boys and girls high schools in two separate wings, features two pavilions built around a central entrance that rises into a bell tower.

The building is a designated New York City landmark.

== Reputation ==
According to the New York Times, in 1895, it was "the ambition of every Brooklyn girl... to enter the Girls High School where she may enjoy the advantages of an advanced education and be prepared for college." The girls were offered courses in Latin, Greek, German, French, botany, zoology, physics, chemistry, astronomy, physiology, psychology, algebra, geometry, calculus; ancient, medieval and modern history; economics, and classes in the "literary masterpieces, both American and English." The article featured a large, detailed drawing of the building which was described as being "one of the finest, from an architectural point of view, in the country, and it is said not to be excelled for completeness of appointments anywhere. the Mayor called it "the foremost institution of its kind in the world," and the Times asserted that "representatives of secondary schools in other cities of this country and in Europe... concurred" with the Mayor in that opinion.

Congresswoman Shirley Chisholm, who entered in the fall of 1939, remembered that students came to Girls' High from all parts of Brooklyn because the school was so "highly regarded." In her time, the school was "all girls, about half of them were white, but the neighborhood by now was nearly all black." Lena Horne attended the "integrated" and "highly prestigious" high school a few years before Chisholm.

== Notable alumnae ==
- Léonie Adams (1899–1988), poet
- Gwendolyn B. Bennett (1902–1981), artist, writer and journalist who was the school's first African-American attendee
- Carol Bruce (1919–2007), singer and actress
- Shirley Chisholm (1924–2005, class of 1942), congresswoman
- Helen Deutsch (1906–1992), screenwriter
- Florence Eldridge (1901–1988), actress
- Lena Horne (1917–2010), singer and actress
- Martha Lorber (1900–1983), dancer, actress, model
- Paule Marshall (1929–2019), novelist
- Jean Norris (1877–1955), first woman magistrate in New York City
- Laura Riding (1901–1991), poet
- Beverly Roberts (1914–2009), actress
- Roxie Roker (1929–1995), actress and mother of Lenny Kravitz
- Betty Smith (1896–1972), author of A Tree Grows in Brooklyn
- Shirley Zussman (1914–2021), sex therapist
