= Public School 7 =

- U.S. National Register of Historic Places
- New York State Register of Historic Places
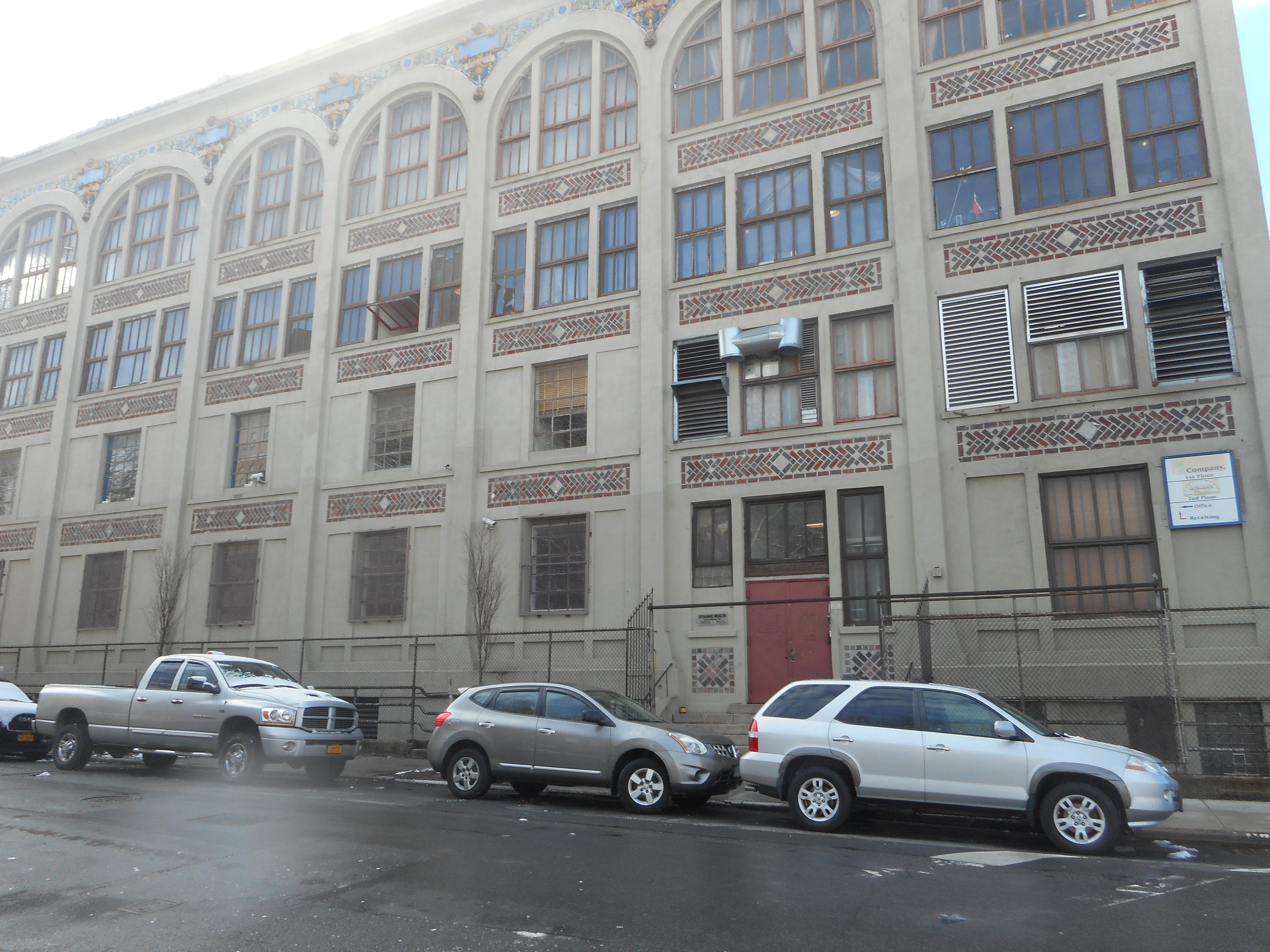
- The school as seen from a playground across Bridge Street.

- Location within New York City Location within New York Location within the United States
- Location: 131-143 York St., New York, New York
- Coordinates: 40°42′6″N 73°59′9″W
- Area: less than one acre
- Built: 1882
- Architect: Naughton, James
- NRHP reference No.: 83003986
- NYSRHP No.: 04701.000464

Significant dates
- Added to NRHP: November 3, 1983
- Designated NYSRHP: September 22, 1983

Public School 7 is a historic school building located in the Dumbo section of Brooklyn, New York City. It was built in 1882 to designs by James W. Naughton. It is a three-story, I-shaped masonry building faced with pressed brick and trimmed in sandstone. It consists of a three-bay center section flanked by a two window-wide wing on either side. Attached to the original building is a rectangular two story brick-and-stone annex built in 1907.

It was listed on the National Register of Historic Places on November 3, 1983. Today it serves as the home of the AMG School of Licensed Practical Nursing.
