= Buildings at 375–379 Flatbush Avenue and 185–187 Sterling Place =

Historic commercial building in Brooklyn, New York

- U.S. National Register of Historic Places
- New York State Register of Historic Places
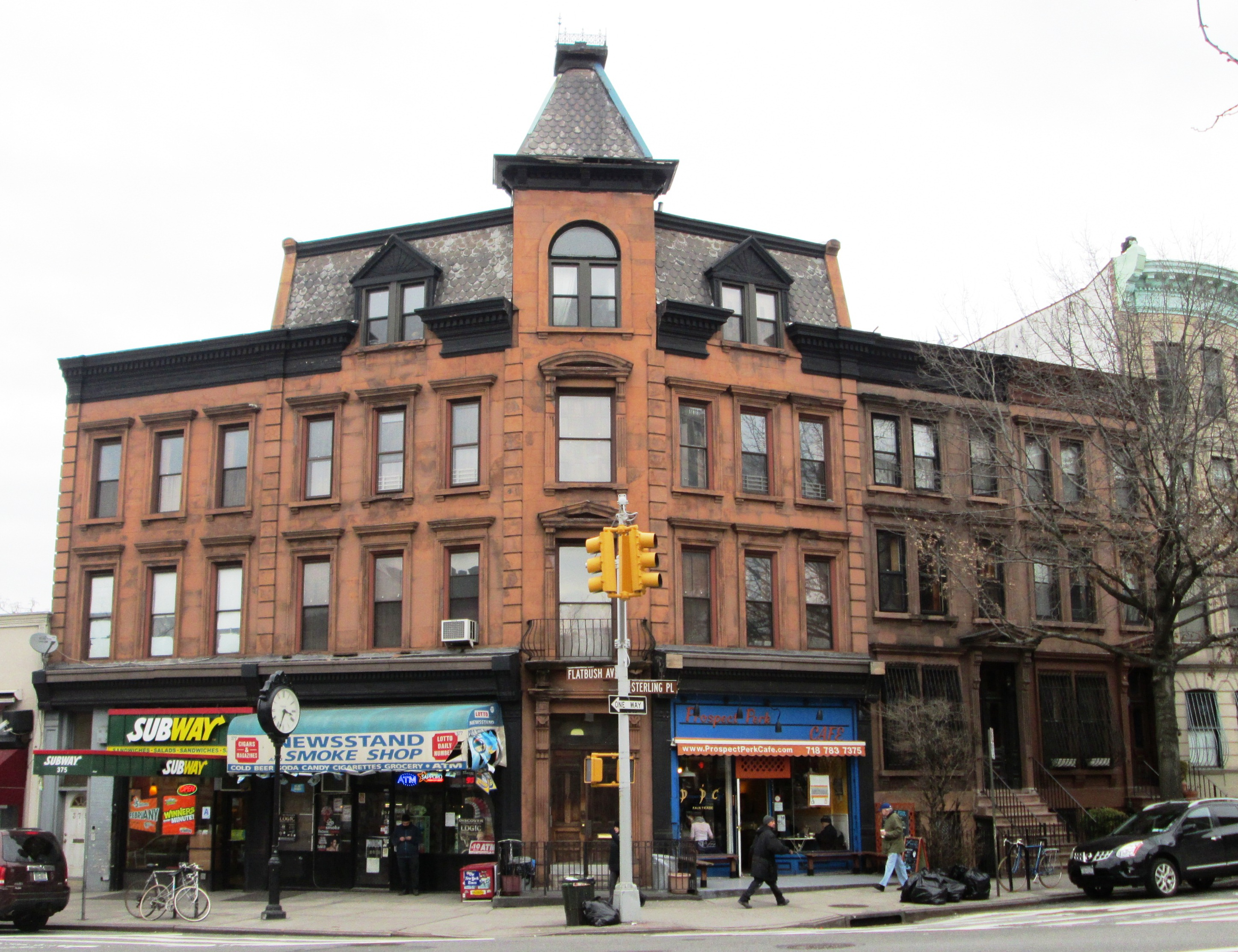
- (2013)

- Location within New York City Location within New York Location within the United States
- Location: 375–379 Flatbush Avenue and 185–187 Sterling Place; Brooklyn, New York City
- Coordinates: 40°40′35.6″N 73°58′18″W
- Built: 1885
- Architect: William M. Cook
- Architectural style: Neo-Grec with Second Empire elements
- NRHP reference No.: 84002440

Significant dates
- Added to NRHP: September 7, 1984
- Designated NYSRHP: June 28, 1984

The buildings at 375–379 Flatbush Avenue and 185–187 Sterling Place are a historic group of four commercial and residential buildings located in the Prospect Heights neighborhood of Brooklyn, New York City. They were built in 1885 and are in the Neo-Grec style with Second Empire elements. The 377–379 Flatbush Avenue building is a 3.5-story masonry structure with a commercial ground floor, apartments above, and a distinctive corner tower with pyramidal roof. It features a mansard roof. The 375 Flatbush Avenue building is a commercial/residential structure identical in form to 377–379 Flatbush Avenue, but without a mansard roof. The 185–187 Sterling Place buildings are two single family row houses built as companions to the other buildings.

The buildings were listed on the National Register of Historic Places in 1984, and are located within the Prospect Heights Historic District, which was created by the New York City Landmarks Preservation Commission in 2009.
