= Substation 401 =

- Substation #401
- U.S. National Register of Historic Places
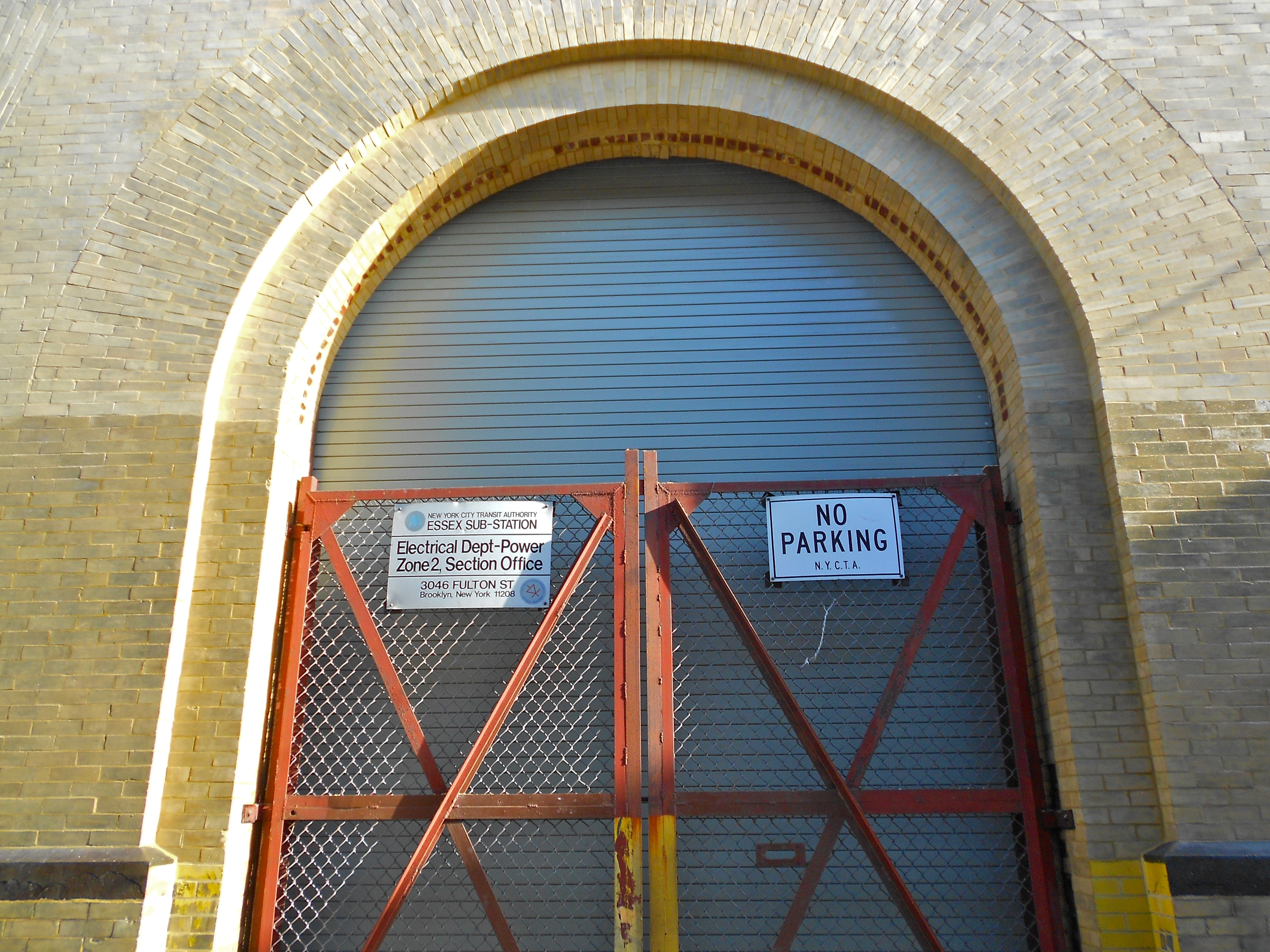
- Main entrance

- Location within New York City
- Location: 3046 Fulton St. bet. Essex St. and Shepherd Ave., Brooklyn, New York
- Coordinates: 40°40′49″N 73°52′57.5″W
- Area: less than one acre
- Built: 1901
- Architect: Murray, Thomas E.
- Architectural style: Beaux Arts
- MPS: New York City Subway System MPS
- NRHP reference No.: 05000680
- Added to NRHP: July 6, 2005

Substation #401, also called the "Essex Sub-station" is a historic New York City Subway electrical substation.

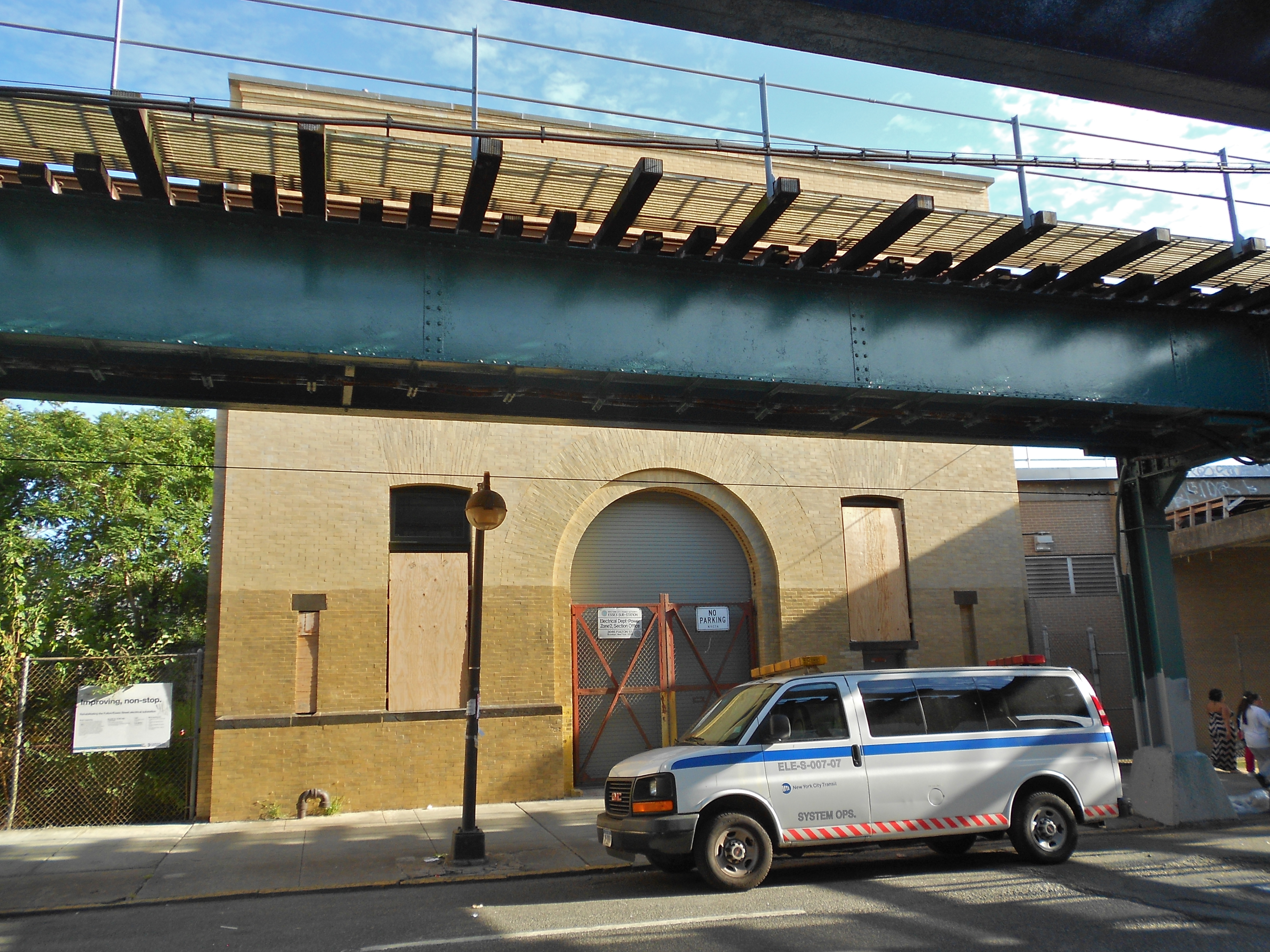
Under the elevated tracks

This facility is located on the south side of Fulton Street, between Essex Street and Shepherd Avenue, in the Cypress Hills neighborhood of the borough of Brooklyn. It sits adjacent to the BMT Jamaica Line between the Cleveland Street and Norwood Avenue stations.

It was built in 1901 by the Brooklyn Rapid Transit Company for the Cypress Hills extension of the BMT Lexington Avenue Line, and is a Beaux Arts style structure. Through a series of acquisitions, it was passed over to the Brooklyn-Manhattan Transit Corporation, then the New York City Board of Transportation, the New York City Transit Authority, and finally the Metropolitan Transportation Authority (MTA), where it remains to this day.

It was listed on the National Register of Historic Places in 2005.
