= Feuchtwanger Stable =

- U.S. National Register of Historic Places
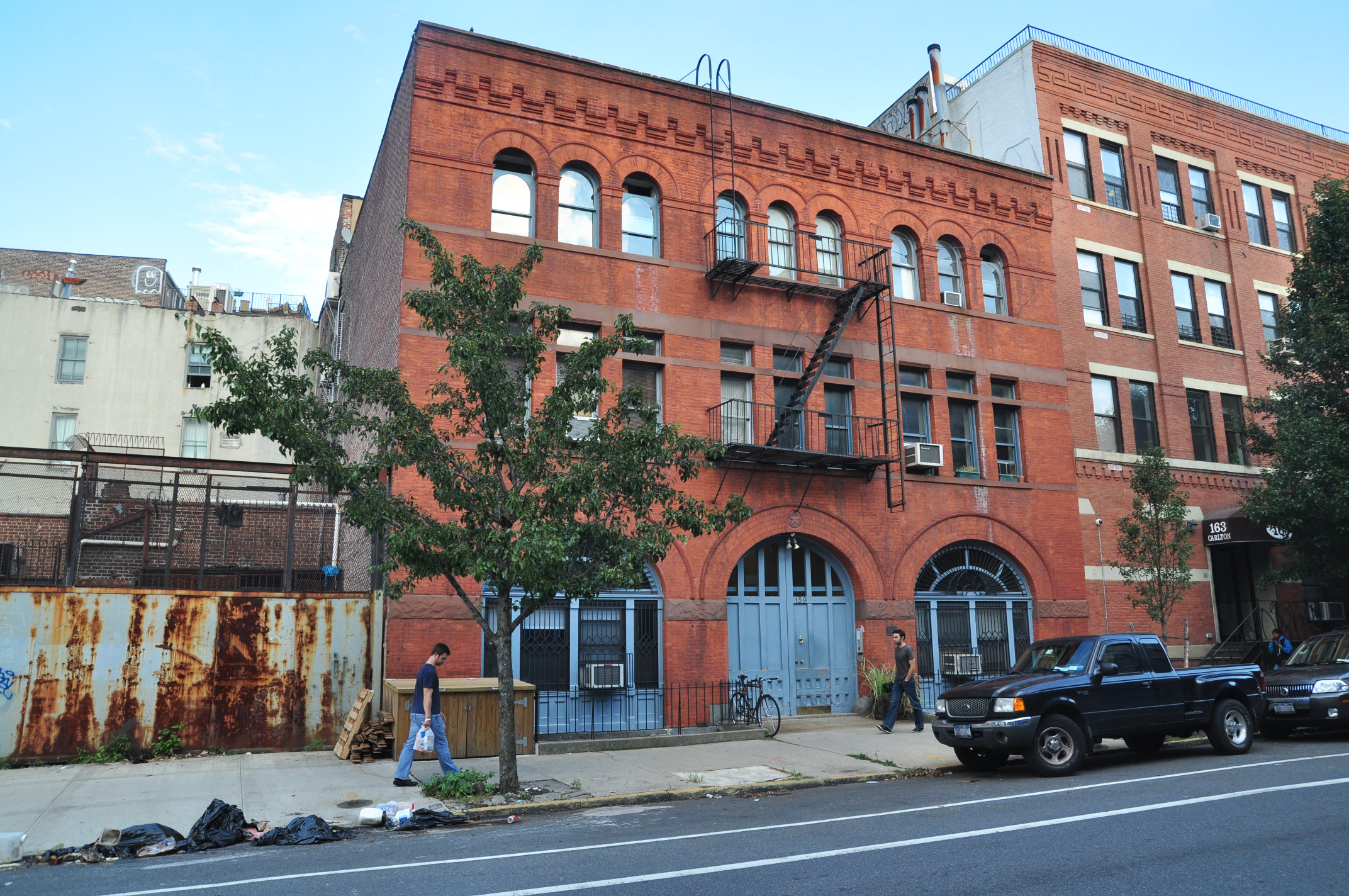
- September 2012

- Location within New York City Location within New York Location within the United States
- Location: 159 Carlton Ave., Brooklyn, New York
- Coordinates: 40°41′34″N 73°58′21″W
- Area: less than one acre
- Built: 1888
- Architect: Morrill, Marshall J.
- Architectural style: Romanesque
- NRHP reference No.: 86000485
- Added to NRHP: March 20, 1986

Feuchtwanger Stable is a historic stable building located in Fort Greene, Brooklyn, New York. It was built in 1888 in the Romanesque Revival style. It is a three-story brick structure trimmed with stone and terra cotta. The first floor features three wide, round arches that once served as entrances for horses. The building has housed a candy factory, a storage warehouse, and an auto repair garage. It was converted into loft condominiums in 1988.

It was listed on the National Register of Historic Places in 1986.
