= Greenwood Baptist Church =

Church in Brooklyn, New York

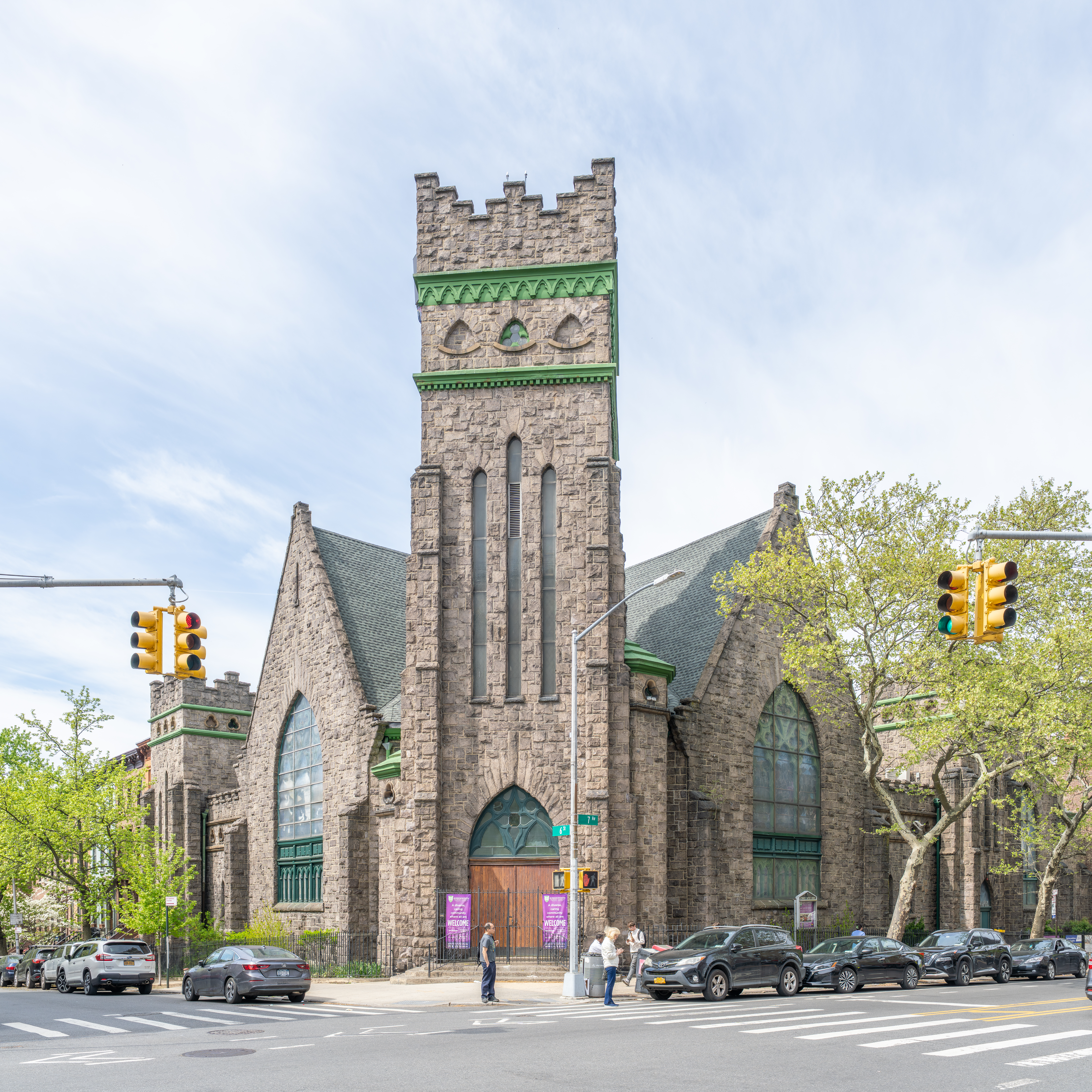
- Greenwood Baptist Church
- Country: United States of America
- Denomination: Baptist
- Website: greenwoodchurch.org

History
- Founded: 28 September 1858
- Founder: Rev. Henry Bromley

Administration
- Division: American Baptist Churches USA

Clergy
- Pastor: Rev. Willa Rose Johnson
- Greenwood Baptist Church
- U.S. National Register of Historic Places
- New York State Register of Historic Places
- Location within New York City Location within New York Location within the United States
- Location: 461 6th Street; Brooklyn, New York 11215
- Coordinates: 40°40′8.45″N 73°58′48.69″W
- Built: 1900
- Architect: Adolph F. Leicht
- Architectural style: Gothic Revival
- NRHP reference No.: 16000017
- NYSRHP No.: 04701.016570

Significant dates
- Added to NRHP: February 16, 2016
- Designated NYSRHP: December 23, 2015

Greenwood Baptist Church (GBC) is an historic Baptist church located in the Park Slope neighborhood of Brooklyn, New York. The congregation was begun as a prayer meeting mission by Reverend Henry Bromley of Strong Place Baptist Church in 1856 and was incorporated as an independent church on September 28, 1858. The current church building was erected in 1900 and is located at 461 6th Street, Brooklyn, NY 11215 at the corner of 7th Avenue. Designed by Adolph Leicht, the Gothic Revival building was listed on the National Register of Historic Places for its architecture in 2016.

== Affiliations ==
Greenwood Baptist Church is affiliated with American Baptist Churches of Metropolitan New York (ABCMNY) and the American Baptist Churches USA (ABCUSA).
