= Willoughby–Suydam Historic District =

Historic district in New York, United States

- U.S. National Register of Historic Places
- U.S. Historic district
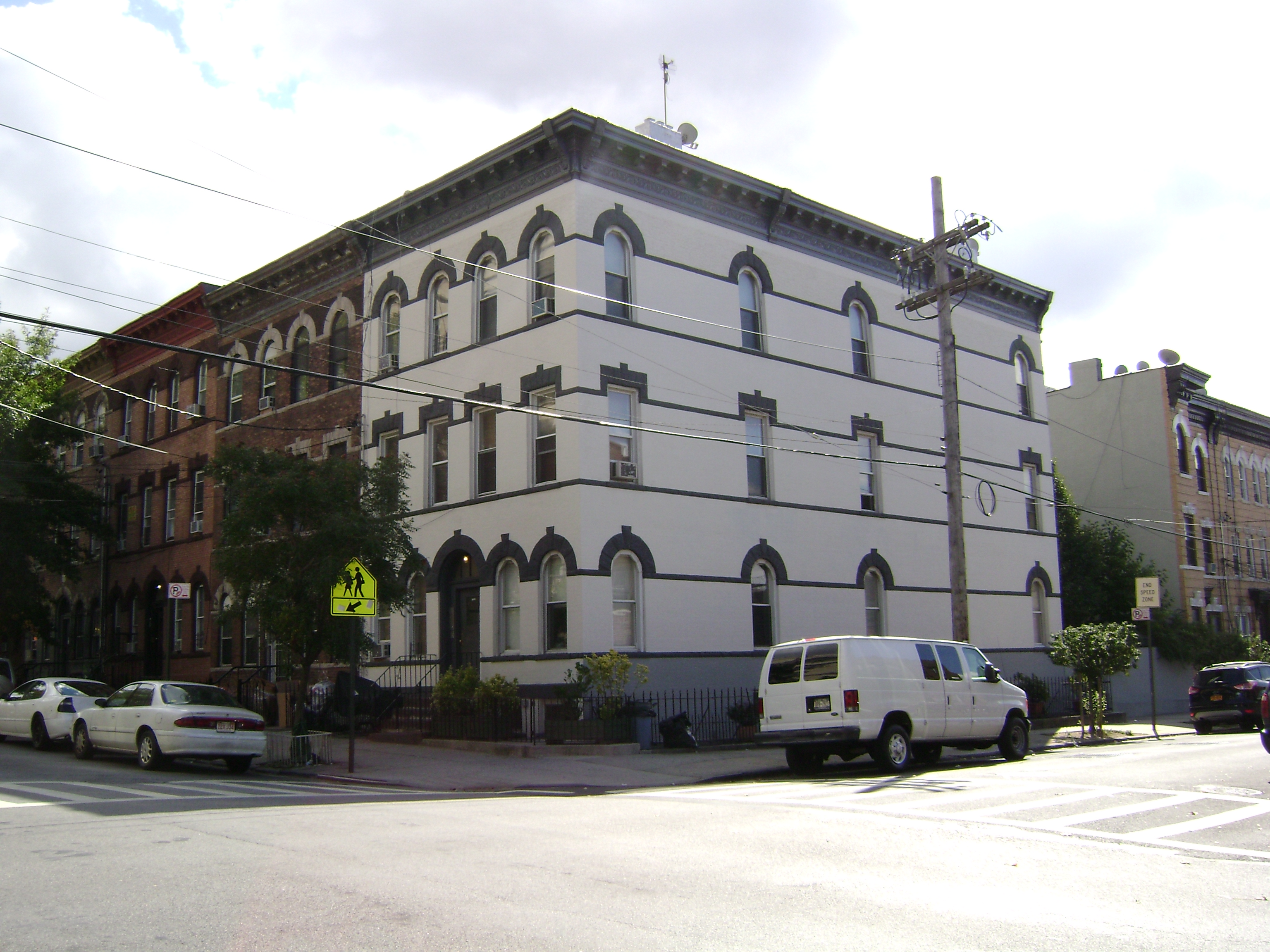

- Location within New York City Location within New York Location within the United States
- Location: Suydam St., Willoughby, St. Nicholas, and Wyckoff Aves., New York, New York
- Coordinates: 40°42′21″N 73°55′14″W
- Area: 4 acres (1.6 ha)
- Built: 1904
- MPS: Ridgewood MRA
- NRHP reference No.: 83001782
- Added to NRHP: September 30, 1983

Willoughby–Suydam Historic District is a national historic district in Brooklyn, New York, New York. It consists of 50 contributing residential buildings built between 1902 and 1904. They are three story brick tenements that have two apartments per floor. Some feature yellow and white terra cotta detailing.

It was listed on the National Register of Historic Places in 1983.
