= James W. Naughton =

American architect

- Born: 1840; Ireland
- Died: 1898 (aged 57–58); Brooklyn, New York
- Occupation: Architect
- Buildings: Girls High School
- Projects: Superintendent of Buildings for the Board of Education of the City of Brooklyn

James W. Naughton (1840–1898) was an American architect, serving as the Superintendent of Buildings for the Board of Education of the City of Brooklyn.

== Biography ==
He was born in Ireland and immigrated to the United States in 1848, at age eight. He worked as an apprentice in the office of J & A Douglas in Milwaukee, Wisconsin. He entered the University of Wisconsin to study architecture in 1859. He returned to Brooklyn, New York in 1861 and continued his studies at the Cooper Union. He served as Superintendent of Buildings for the City of Brooklyn from 1874 to 1876. In 1879, he was appointed Superintendent of Buildings for the Board of Education of the City of Brooklyn, a position he held until his death in 1898. During this period he designed all the school buildings in the city of Brooklyn.

== Selected works ==
- Girls High School (1886), Brooklyn, New York
- Boys High School (1891), Brooklyn, New York
- Public School 108 (1895), Brooklyn, New York
- Public School 9 Annex (1895), Brooklyn, New York
