= Charles Ludington =

Charles Ludington may refer to:

- Charles Cameron Ludington, professor and specialist in the history of the wine industry
- Charles Townsend Ludington (1896–1968), businessman and socialite of Philadelphia
- Charles Henry Ludington (1825–1910), American merchant in the dry goods business
