= Gage and Tollner =

Restaurant in Brooklyn, New York

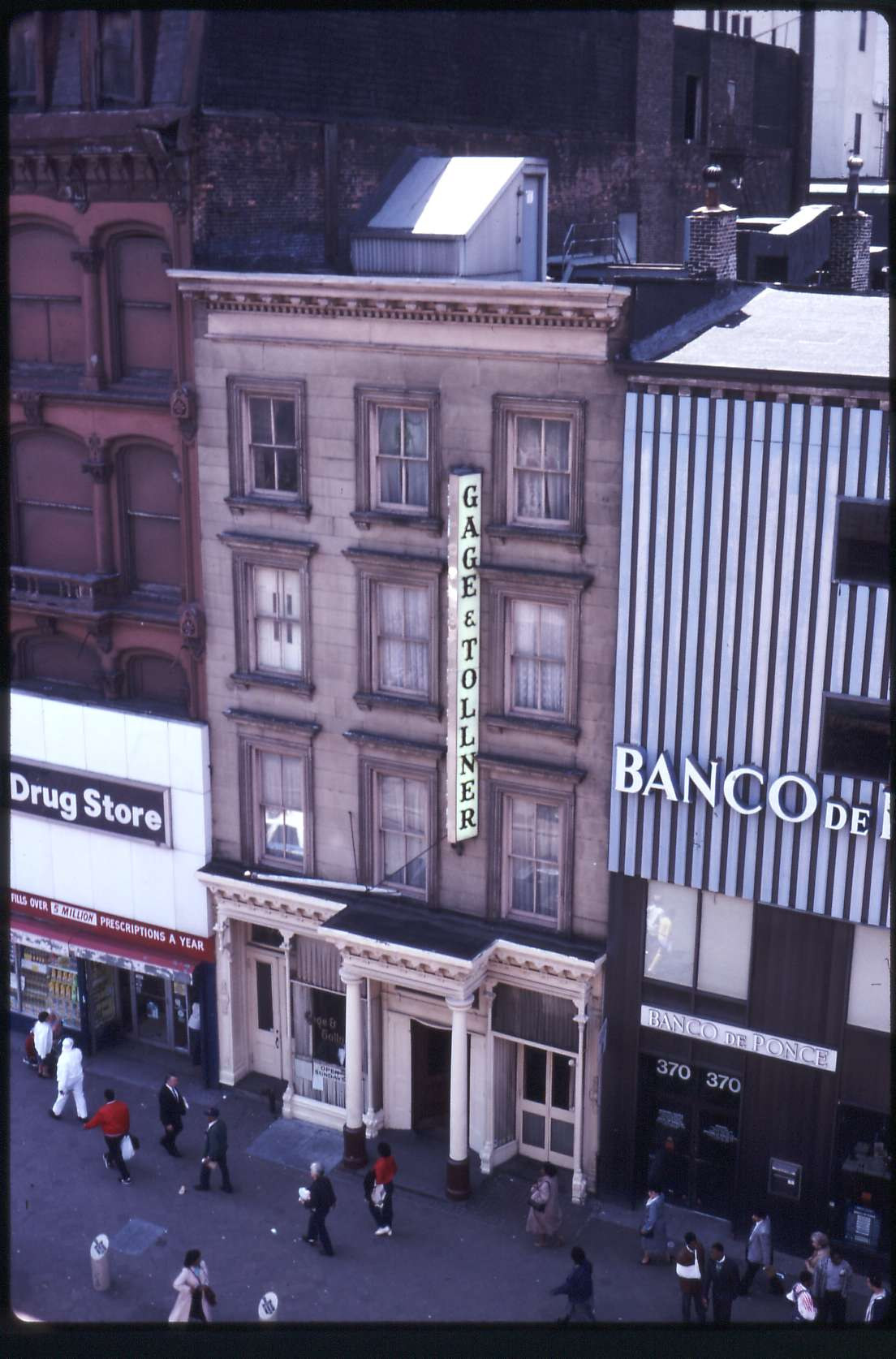
- Gage and Tollner in 1987
- Interactive map of Gage and Tollner

Restaurant information
- Established: 1879 (original); April 15, 2021 (current)
- Closed: February 14, 2004 (original)
- Owners: St. John Frizell, Sohui Kim, Ben Schneider
- Head chef: Sohui Kim
- Food type: American cuisine
- Location: 372 Fulton Street, New York, Kings (Note: Kings County is coextensive with the New York City borough of Brooklyn.), New York, United States
- Coordinates: 40°41′29″N 73°59′16″W
- Seating capacity: 70 (dining room); 40 (bar)
- Website: www.gageandtollner.com
- Gage and Tollner Restaurant
- U.S. National Register of Historic Places
- New York State Register of Historic Places
- New York City Landmark
- Location within New York City Location within New York Location within the United States
- Area: less than one acre
- Built: 1875
- Architectural style: Italianate
- NRHP reference No.: 82003362
- NYSRHP No.: 04701.000172
- NYCL No.: 0836, 0885

Significant dates
- Added to NRHP: June 3, 1982
- Designated NYSRHP: April 9, 1982
- Designated NYCL: November 12, 1974

Gage and Tollner is an American cuisine restaurant on 372–374 Fulton Street in the Downtown Brooklyn neighborhood of New York City, New York, U.S. Named for its initial proprietors, Charles Gage and Eugene Tollner, the restaurant occupies the lowest two stories of a converted four-story brownstone residence. The restaurant building, dating from the mid-1870s, is listed on the National Register of Historic Places, and its facade and interior are New York City designated landmarks. As of 2021, St. John Frizell, Sohui Kim, and Ben Schneider operate the restaurant, with Kim as the head chef.

The restaurant opened in 1879, when Charles Gage opened a restaurant at 302 Fulton Street, and was named Gage & Tollner's in 1882. Gage & Tollner's moved to 372–374 Fulton Street around 1889 and soon became a popular restaurant for judges, politicians, and businessmen. A.H. Cunningham and Alexander Ingalls took over the restaurant's operation in 1911, and the Dewey family operated the restaurant for nearly seven decades starting in 1919. A partnership led by Peter Aschkenasy bought Gage and Tollner in 1988. Joseph Chirico operated the restaurant from 1995 until 2004, when the restaurant closed. The Gage and Tollner space was then occupied by various other stores during the 2000s and 2010s. Following a crowdfunding campaign in 2018, the restaurant reopened in April 2021.

Although the restaurant building's exterior was designed in an Italianate style, the interior retains its original Victorian design, with a main dining room, a waiting room, and a second-floor cocktail lounge. The main dining room measures 90 by 25 feet (27.4 by 7.6 m) across and contains woodwork, arched mirrors, two bars, and a group of chandeliers with gas-powered and electric lights. The restaurant initially specialized in seafood, meat chops, and steaks, and it served a large variety of oyster dishes during the 20th century, pivoting to Southern fare in the 1980s. Gage & Tollner was also known for its waitstaff, who wore insignia on their uniforms to denote the length of their employment, and its clientele, which included Diamond Jim Brady, Truman Capote, Fanny Brice, Jimmy Durante, and Mae West. Over the years, the restaurant has been the subject of much commentary, both for its architecture and for its cuisine and service.

== History ==
=== Early years ===
The structure at 372–374 Fulton Street was built in the mid-1870s, likely in 1875, as a private residence. The Craft family had acquired the site from the Smith family in 1873 and owned the structure, known as the Craft Building, for fifty years. The residence housed a tailor's shop in the 1870s.

Charles Gage opened an "eating house" at 302 Fulton Street in November 1879. The original restaurant served ale and lager, as well as dishes like lobster Newberg which cost $0.75 (equivalent to $26 in 2025). Eugene Tollner joined him in 1880, and the restaurant became known as Gage & Tollner's in 1882. (Note: National Park Service 1982, p. 4 claims that Tollner joined the restaurant in 1884.) Tollner was the son of Charles Tollner, who founded a hardware store that subsequently became Hammacher Schlemmer under the ownership of Eugene Tollner's cousin William Schlemmer. The restaurant moved to 372–374 Fulton Street on February 18, 1889. (Note: Numerous sources give a date of 1889. In a 1925 interview, Tollner gave a conflicting date of 1887.) Tollner recalled that the new location was further away from the then-independent city of Brooklyn's commercial center, which at the time was to the northwest, between Brooklyn City Hall (later Borough Hall) and Fulton Ferry. Gage and Tollner installed a storm door in 1890, and electric lights were installed during that decade to supplement the original gas lights. By then, young men frequently took their fiancées out to dinner at Gage & Tollner before proposing to them.

Gage & Tollner's became popular in its early years, in part because of its location along Fulton Street, one of the primary avenues running through Brooklyn. Tollner recalled that numerous department-store executives, judges, and politicians favored the restaurant. In its early years, Gage & Tollner's was known for its oysters and clam bellies. By 1900, according to the New York Herald Tribune, "ladies were not permitted to smoke, and arrived at the restaurant at 372–4 Fulton St. in horse-drawn carriages escorted by gentlemen in silk hats". At the time, a lobster dinner cost $1.25 (equivalent to $48 in 2025), and a drink cost $0.25 (equivalent to $10 in 2025). Gage & Tollner's also traditionally closed down between June 1 and September 1 of each year, as there were no oysters to serve during the summer. As such, the restaurant's annual reopening was often a major event. Gage and Tollner started allowing men to smoke at their restaurant in 1902, but women were still banned from smoking.

By the early 1910s, Gage and Tollner was one of the few "oyster houses" remaining in Brooklyn; at the time, oyster houses were considered separate from restaurants. Tollner and Gage decided to relinquish management of the restaurant on December 31, 1910, as both men had been operating the restaurant for 30 years. They sold the restaurant to A.H. Cunningham and Alexander Ingalls, with the provision that neither the interior nor the name be changed. Although Gage retired and lived for nine more years, Tollner decided to continue working at his namesake restaurant. In recognition of the partnership, Tollner named his only son after Gage. One of the restaurant's co-owners, Marcus J. Ingalls, died there of a heart attack in February 1911. Charles Gage's brother Edward, the longtime manager of the restaurant, died in 1917 after working there for nearly four decades. Ingalls offered to appoint Tollner as partner, but Tollner refused because he "would rather take orders than be responsible for the running of the restaurant".

=== Dewey ownership ===
In May 1919, wine merchant Hiram Stapleford Dewey bought a controlling stake in Gage & Tollner's and formed a new corporation to take over the restaurant. The Dewey family agreed to retain the restaurant's original name and quality of service. Hiram, who operated a restaurant in Manhattan, placed his son Seth Bradford Dewey in charge of the restaurant. The sale was finalized in July 1919, and the Deweys announced plans to close the restaurant for a month-long renovation. Seth Dewey took over full ownership from his father that December and operated Gage & Tollner's with his business partner Alexander Graham.

==== 1920s to 1940s ====
After taking over the restaurant, Seth Dewey convinced Tollner to remain as the restaurant's general manager, and Eugene Tollner continued to work there until his death in 1935. The restaurant was the only chop house in New York City to remain open during Prohibition in the United States, and its ventilation system was upgraded during the 1921 off-season. Dewey and Graham formed the Dewham Company to buy the restaurant building in March 1923. The next year, Gage & Tollner began allowing dancing and music for the first time in its history, and women were allowed to smoke around the same time. Tollner attributed the restaurant's prosperity to the fact that oyster dishes were prioritized, as well as to his real-estate acumen. One employee claimed in 1929 that the restaurant had shelled 38 million oysters in nearly half a century, which equated to 50,000 oysters per month.

The restaurant celebrated its 50th anniversary in November 1929, at which point many employees had worked there for decades. In 1934, the Times Union reported that the twelve longest-tenured workers had worked there for a combined 183 years. Gage & Tollner's began serving food on Sundays in 1932, following an increase in the number of people who went to dinner on the Sabbath. With the repeal of Prohibition in 1935, oyster dishes began to increase in popularity, since many guests preferred alcoholic beverages with oysters. During the same decade, the restaurant suffered financially due to the Great Depression.

Seth Dewey died in 1938, and his son Edward took over that October. Before his death, Seth had told Ed, "You don't tamper with success", so the latter made few changes to Gage and Tollner after acquiring it. Ed and his wife Trudy lived on the top two floors of the restaurant building. An air-conditioning system was installed in the restaurant in 1940, and the facade and entrance were restored the next year. During World War II, the restaurant remained open; some employees quit to fight in the war, and there were shortages of items such as steak. The restaurant was renovated again in 1947. Some of the restaurant's employees went on strike in 1948, following months of negotiations over whether the restaurant should hire non-union workers.

==== 1950s to 1980s ====
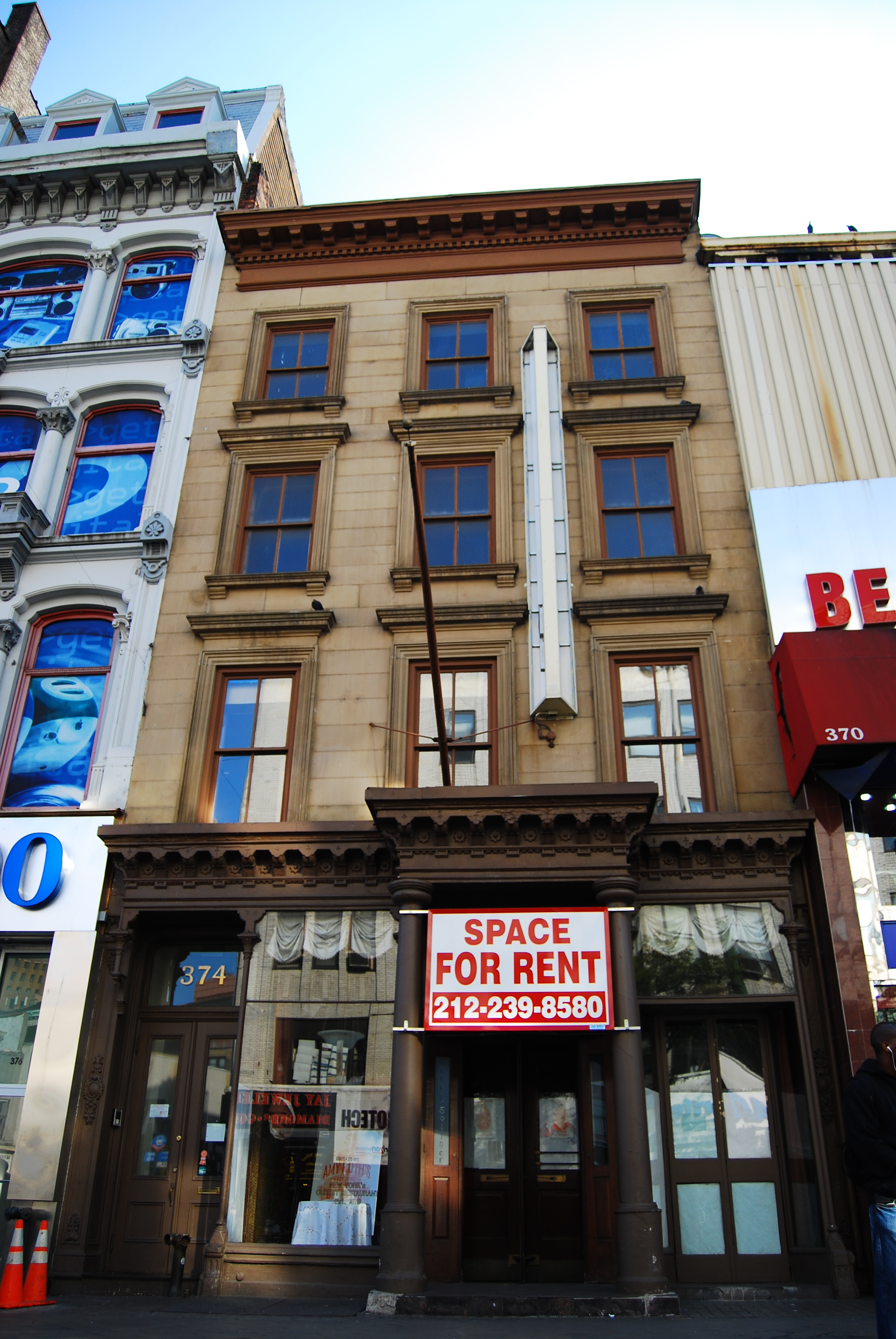
Facade of the restaurant building

During the 1950s, the restaurant referred to the colder weather months as "turtle soup weather", and it would procure live turtles and prepare its own recipe. The restaurant also introduced new dishes, such as a whale steak. Ed Dewey and his brother Tom renovated the restaurant's exterior in 1953, and Gage and Tollner celebrated its 75th anniversary in 1954, turning on its gas lights for a week for the occasion; the gas lights were illuminated on Mondays and Tuesdays during that time. By then, the clientele included city officials, politicians, and lawyers. The restaurant refused to serve black customers until 1960, although all its waiters were black men. The restaurant began hiring white workers and women in the mid-20th century. In addition, people from outside Brooklyn began visiting the restaurant.

John B. Simmons began co-managing the restaurant in 1973. At the time, there were plans to convert the neighboring section of Fulton Street into a pedestrian mall, although Ed Dewey did not think it would negatively impact business. After the pedestrian mall was established in 1976, drivers could no longer drop passengers off in front of the restaurant. The New York City Landmarks Preservation Commission (LPC) designated Gage and Tollner's exterior as a city landmark in November 1974. Although the owners did not plan to alter the restaurant, the designation was part of the LPC's initiative to preserve the city's architectural history. The interior was designated in March 1975, with the LPC citing the interior as having a Gay Nineties atmosphere. The New York City Board of Estimate approved the landmark status that May, making Gage and Tollner the city's third interior landmark, after the New York Public Library Main Branch and Grant's Tomb, and the city's first interior landmark within a commercial building.

Gage and Tollner marked its centennial in 1979. and the restaurant building was listed on the National Register of Historic Places in 1982. Meanwhile, patronage had declined after the Fulton Mall was completed. By the 1980s, the neighborhood was no longer considered safe after dark, and even residents of nearby Brooklyn Heights would not eat there. The restaurant was frequently deserted during peak hours, and it lost more than half of its business from 1981 to 1988, prompting the Deweys to reduce the staff from 50 to 30. Its signature dish, clam bellies, was often sold out. Ed and Trudy Dewey, who wished to retire, put the restaurant for sale in 1987 with an asking price of $1.8 million. Within a year, they had received several offers for the restaurant.

=== Aschkenasy ownership ===
In November 1988, the restaurant was bought by a partnership led by Peter Aschkenasy, who promised to preserve the restaurant's character. In addition to Aschkenasy, the partnership included his wife Marcy Blum and retired city official James F. Capalino. The acquisition was in part a real-estate investment, as Aschkenasy wanted to attract the growing number of office workers in Downtown Brooklyn. He briefly considered moving the interior to Manhattan, but this was not possible because the building was a landmark. Aschkenasy instead renovated the restaurant, saying the landmark status made Gage and Tollner "a more desirable destination".

To attract a wider range of clients, Aschkenasy pushed back the closing time and added common American fare such as lobster and steak. In 1988, he also hired chef Edna Lewis, who expanded the restaurant's menu by adding Southern cuisine such as cornbread, catfish, and she-crab soup. According to The New York Times, Aschkenasy "was widely credited with reviving the restaurant" after hiring Lewis. The Brooklyn Eagle retrospectively wrote that Aschkenasy's decision to hire Lewis, who was black, was "quite the statement for a restaurant where African-Americans once weren't allowed". To obtain ingredients for the restaurant, Aschkenasy traveled to the Fulton Fish Market, while Lewis went to local greenmarkets. Lewis, who had promised to retire when she turned 75, retired in 1992.

Even though total business had increased from the 1980s, the restaurant filed for bankruptcy protection in March 1993, with $1.37 million in liabilities and less than $330,000 in assets. The restaurant remained open throughout the bankruptcy proceedings. The Independent Savings Bank foreclosed on Gage and Tollner in 1995 and spent six months looking for a new owner. At the time, Gage and Tollner was competing with numerous cheaper fast-food restaurants on Fulton Mall; most of the major department stores on the street had closed; and the nearby MetroTech office development had not spurred as much economic activity as Aschkenasy had expected. Gage and Tollner's business was particularly impacted by the closure of the Abraham & Straus department store, whose executives regularly booked four tables at lunchtime. Aschkenasy had spent $10,000 to replace old pipes and claimed that utility bills cost more than $6,000 per month.

=== Chirico ownership ===
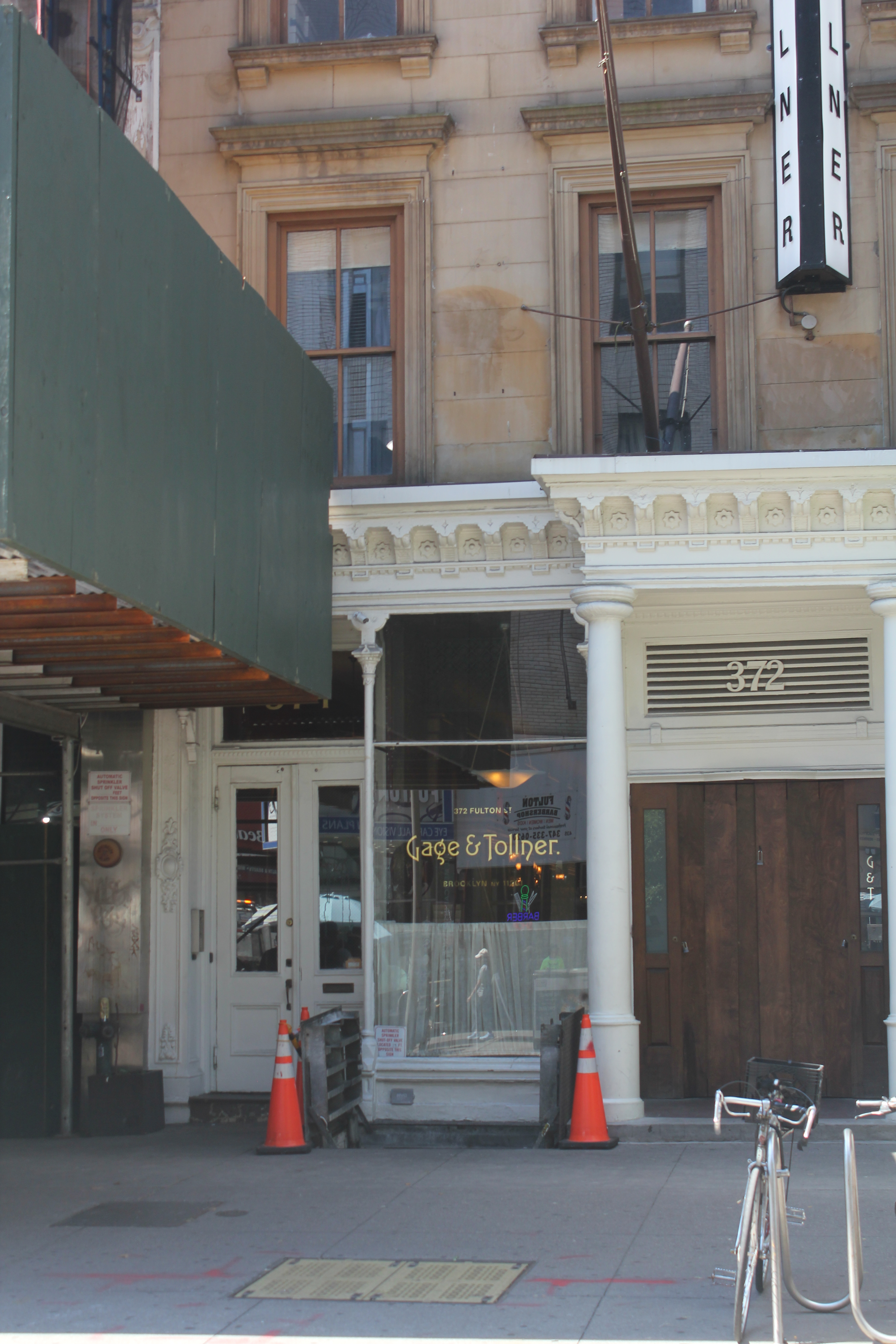
The restaurant's entrance

Joseph Chirico, a restaurateur who was purportedly associated with the Gambino crime family, bought the restaurant in June 1995 and closed it for renovations. Chirico spent $653,000 on the restaurant and another $500,000 on renovations. The restaurant's lenders allowed Chirico to buy the restaurant's mortgage at a discount, and the Brooklyn Union Gas Company restored the restaurant's gas pipes for free. Chirico said he "tried to retain the historic flavor of the restaurant while providing modern amenities". Raymond Caliendo designed the restoration, for which he won an architectural award in 2003. Several dozen seats were replaced with a cocktail bar, a modern air-conditioning system was installed, and the kitchen was replaced. In addition, the woodwork, lights, and mirrors were refurbished, and the ceiling was restored. Chirico expected to reopen the restaurant by September 1995, but he found the space to be in "very bad condition", and Gage and Tollner remained closed at the end of the year.

The restaurant finally opened in May 1996, with Marvin James as the restaurant's new chef. Although he kept much of Lewis's older menu, James said he wanted "to make the food become familiar so that anyone shopping at Macy's or even paying a fine at the courthouse can come right on in". Food consultant Bea Beasley was hired later that year to help update the menu. The revived Gage and Tollner soon became popular among customers who wanted seafood dishes like clam bellies and she-crab soup. Initially, the restaurant attracted Europeans, though a growing proportion New Yorkers were visiting Gage and Tollner by the late 1990s. The Brooklyn Club moved to the upper stories of the restaurant building in the mid-1990s, remaining until 1999, when the club was dissolved. Rad Matmati succeeded James as the chef in October 1997.

In 1998, Gage and Tollner became one of the first members of Landmark Restaurants, a nationwide organization of historically significant restaurants. Gage and Tollner also participated in local festivals such as Brooklyn Eats, Taste of Italy, and a red-wine-and-red-meat festival. In addition to dinners, the restaurant hosted private parties by the 2000s. Nonetheless, the restaurant struggled to attract customers because of the prevalence of fast food outlets on Fulton Mall, and because Gage and Tollner was the only non-fast-food eatery for several blocks. The restaurant introduced valet parking, but that did not bring in enough customers to sustain the business. According to Chirico, "the business was dragging every day" by 2004. As a result, the restaurant closed on February 14, 2004. Chirico promised to reopen the restaurant elsewhere, albeit in a place that was easier to access via car.

=== Use by other businesses ===
In the decade after Gage and Tollner closed, the first floor became what Crain's New York called "a revolving door for tenants", and the second story became a tattoo parlor. Joseph Jemal bought the restaurant building for $2.8 million in early 2004, intending to rent it to an upscale restaurateur. Potential tenants had to preserve the interior of the restaurant because it was a landmark. The building was ultimately rented to a T.G.I. Friday's fast-food franchise, which opened in September 2004 following some modifications to the tables. Despite serving American cuisine and adding jukeboxes and TVs, the T.G.I. Friday's franchise was unable to make a profit, in part because landmark regulations prevented the franchisees from adding large signs. In addition, many local residents opposed the T.G.I. Friday's. The T.G.I. Friday's franchise closed suddenly in early 2007.

Jemal leased the building to Amy Ruth's, a soul food restaurant based in Harlem, in October 2007; the restaurant was to have opened the following February. The opening of the Amy Ruth's restaurant was delayed several times, and the operators failed to obtain a liquor license due to procedural errors. The New York City Marshal's office evicted Amy Ruth's operators in August 2008 due to non-payment of rent, and Chirico began considering reopening Gage and Tollner within the space.

In January 2009, Raymond Chera signed a lease to operate an Arby's sandwich franchise at the building, and he submitted alteration plans to the LPC. The plans were delayed by disputes over such matters as the floor color, counter, and booths, as well as an illuminated menu. The LPC approved the plans in May 2009. The Arby's franchise opened in January 2010 but lasted only until that August. Jemal attributed the difficulty of renting the building's ground floor to the fact that it was small, and that any modification required approvals from the LPC. Although the LPC mandated that the ground floor remain in use as a restaurant, the space was too small for a conventional restaurant. The Wall Street Journal reported in 2012 that "brokers who know Fulton Street say [Jemal] was able to expect $30,000 a month in rent" and that many restaurants, other than fast-food chains, could not afford that rent.

Ladies & Gents Costume Jewelry moved into the building in July 2011 and renovated the interior without receiving the LPC's approval, prompting the agency to threaten to fine the store. The store's operators submitted an alteration application, which the LPC rejected in 2012 because the application was not detailed enough. The LPC voted in January 2013 to reject the changes that had already been made to the restaurant space. Jemal considered leasing the space to an upscale restaurant in mid-2016, citing the revival of business in Downtown Brooklyn, and evicted Ladies & Gents Costume Jewelry that November. By then, Jemal had received proposals from numerous restaurateurs, and workers quickly removed the former jewelry store's displays and decorations. Jemal hosted several survey panels at the former restaurant space in mid-2017.

=== Revival ===
==== Fundraising campaign ====
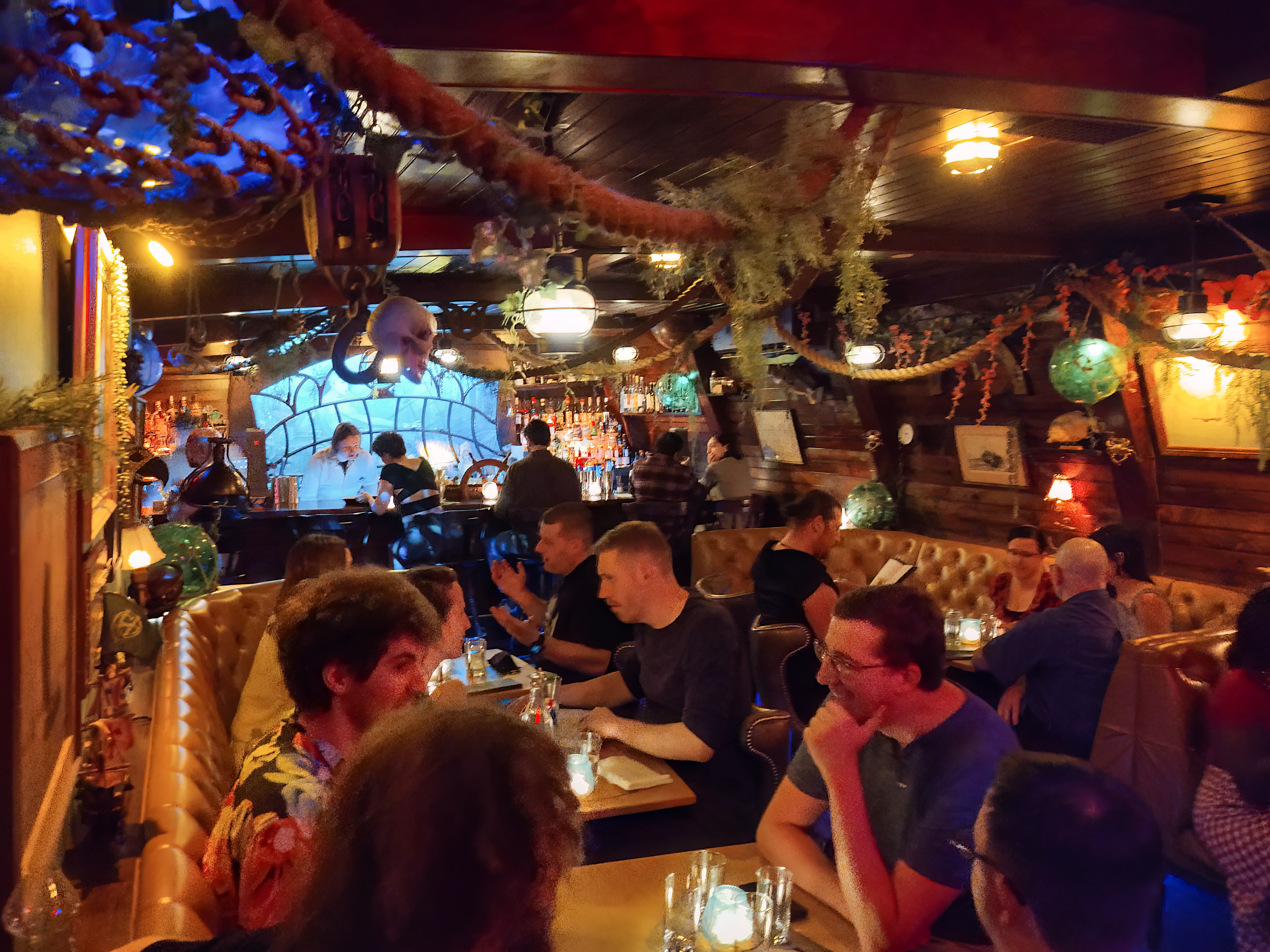
The restaurant's Sunken Harbor Club

In July 2018, restaurateurs St. John Frizell, Sohui Kim, and Ben Schneider started a crowdfunding campaign on Wefunder to revive the restaurant. Frizell, Kim, and Schneider, had intended to open a bar when they learned that the restaurant was up for lease. Frizell recalled being "awe-struck" by the restaurant's history and reputation, and Kim later credited the building's 1974 landmark designation with having influenced their decision to lease the restaurant. The team aimed to raise $600,000 through crowdfunding, out of a total renovation budget of $1.8 million or $2 million. In exchange for their contribution, the investors would receive interest payments from the restaurant once it was operational. The group planned to serve cuisine from Edna Lewis's tenure at the restaurant, as well as "traditional fare, with possible dishes including Welsh rarebit and clams casino".

Although individual investors had to give at least $1,000, the campaign soon received many donations because of media coverage of the effort. The group had raised $400,000 by January 2019. Frizell, Kim and Schneider signed the lease with landlord William Jemal that month, becoming the restaurant's fifth operators. Kim planned to take over as the new restaurant's chef, while Frizell was to become the bartender. By that August, the team had raised $484,091; more than a quarter of donations came from three ZIP Codes surrounding the restaurant.

The LPC and the local community board had to approve plans for the site, and the LPC approved the restaurant's restoration in May 2019. Frizell, Kim, and Schneider, along with 35 equity investors and 200 smaller stakeholders, planned to modify the interior and add an exterior sign. The interior modifications included extending the 1990s-era cocktail bar, refurbishing the original bar into a seafood bar, adding dining booths, and adding a cocktail lounge on the upper level. To preserve the original design, the owners looked through 11 boxes of archive materials at the Brooklyn Historical Society; they discovered another box of memorabilia in the attic during the renovation. A new outdoor "Gage & Tollner" sign was erected in January 2020.

==== Opening ====
The grand reopening was announced for March 15, 2020. With the onset of the COVID-19 pandemic in New York City, the reopening was indefinitely postponed one day before it was to occur, and Frizell had to furlough all staff members because of a ban on indoor dining. The revived Gage and Tollner opened in February 2021 but initially only provided delivery and take-out service. The restaurant officially reopened for dine-in service on April 15, 2021, after restrictions on indoor dining capacity were decreased and COVID-19 vaccinations were available for restaurant workers. The operators initially planned to serve dinner only and to open the cocktail lounge and an upper-level dining room at a later date. Because of extremely high patronage, the second floor was converted into the Sunken Harbor Club, which opened that November.

The New York Landmarks Conservancy gave the restaurant's owners a Lucy G. Moses Preservation Award in 2022. The restaurant started serving lunch on Fridays through Sundays in 2023, and it started selling take-out pastry boxes on weekends in early 2024.

== Architecture ==
Gage and Tollner is housed in a four-story late Italianate style brownstone building at 372–374 Fulton Street in the Downtown Brooklyn neighborhood of New York City, New York, U.S. The interior of the restaurant is designed in the Victorian style. The identities of the original architect(s) are not known. The restaurant is one of the few restaurants in New York City designated as an interior landmark, as well as the only restaurant outside Manhattan designated as an interior landmark as of 2023.

=== Exterior ===
Only the northern elevation of the facade, facing Fulton Street, is visible. The wooden ground-level storefront was likely added when the restaurant moved into the building and is designed in the Neo-Grec style. At the center of the storefront are a pair of Doric columns which support a slightly projecting portico. To the left is a double door and a window, while to the right is another door; they are separated by colonettes, which in turn are topped by capitals with foliate decoration. These support a frieze with alternating eight-pointed stars and decorative brackets. A cornice runs horizontally above the facade.

The three upper stories are clad in brownstone and have molded frames. Corbels support the sills at the bottom of each window, while cornices protrude above each window. There is a cornice with modillions and fascia running horizontally above the fourth story. On the western and eastern sides of the restaurant building are party walls that abut neighboring buildings. The southern, or rear, elevation cannot be seen from the street.

=== Interior ===
The interior retains its original Victorian design. Rather than emphasizing elegant design, the restaurant's original architect(s) wanted to make the space appear comfortable through the quality of the workmanship, such as mirrors and woodwork furnishings. In particular, the main dining room was intended to resemble the interior of a railcar. By the 1990s, the first floor had a total capacity of 110 people, while another 70 people could fit on the second floor. As of 2021, the main dining room seats 70 people, while the bar has 40 seats.

==== Main dining room ====
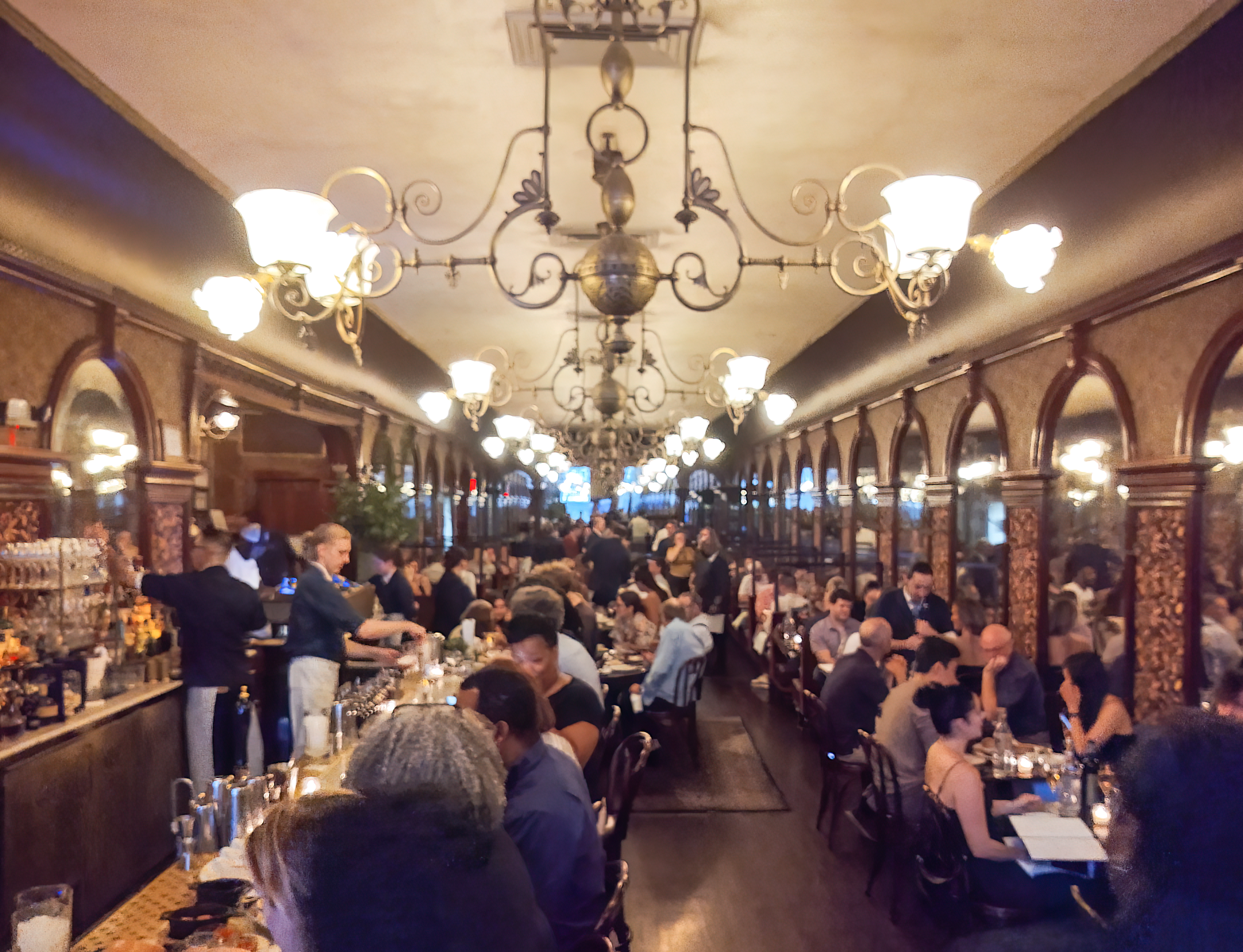
Interior in 2023

The main dining room is a relatively small space of 2,083 square feet (193.5 m^{2}); it measures roughly 90 ft (27 m) deep by 25 ft (7.6 m) across. The wainscoting on the side walls is about as high as the dining tables. Above the wainscoting, the side walls are decorated with arched mirrors, while the rear or southern wall features a large flat arched mirror flanked by smaller recessed mirrors. There are dark-red cherry frames around each mirror and dark red velvet panels between the mirrors. The mirrors were intended to make the space look larger than its actual size. Their presence is credited to Tollner, who, according to the Brooklyn Daily Eagle, said that although customers might become disillusioned with murals, they never got tired of seeing themselves.

The eastern or left wall contains a niche with a mahogany serving bar, salvaged from the original restaurant at 302 Fulton Street, which was extended in the 2020s. A 15-foot-long (4.6 m) mahogany and cherry-wood cocktail bar was installed at the front of the room in the mid-1990s. The rest of the restaurant had mahogany tables, which could seat two to four people each. These tables were converted to cherry-wood booths in the restaurant's 2020s renovation. The spandrels at the tops of the arched mirrors contain embossed gold-colored Lincrusta Walton coverings, which The New York Times described as "the poor man's stamped leather". The cornice at the top of each wall is made of dark red cherry wood, supporting a coved ceiling. The ceiling is covered in gold leaf. The carpet was originally decorated in green-and-blue on a red background.

The interior lighting scheme consists of 36 gas lamps, as well as electric lighting installed in 1888. The light fixtures are attached to nine chandeliers that are placed on the ceiling at regular intervals. At the ends of each chandelier's arms are a pair of gas jets with cut glass diffusers, as well as an incandescent lamp between each jet that pointed downward at a 45-degree angle. Glass bowls were placed around the light bulbs at some point after the restaurant opened. The gas lights were illuminated every night at 6 p.m. or 7 p.m. The electric lights supplemented the gas lights in the 20th century. The gas lights were no longer used after the original Gage and Tollner closed in the 2000s, and the gas lights were deactivated in 2020 to comply with modern fire-safety regulations. In addition, the original carpeted floor was replaced with a stained-wood floor, and there is a non-functional payphone next to the bar.

==== Other spaces ====
Just inside the entrance were originally two seating bays, one on either side of the main doorway, for guests waiting to be seated. These bays occupied the wood-framed storefront windows facing Fulton Street. Their walls were decorated with swirling motifs, while the ceilings had sunburst motifs and embossed Lincrusta Walton coverings. The restaurant did not have a coat room; instead, guests' belongings were placed on spikes affixed to the wall.

On the second floor is the Sunken Harbor Club, a cocktail lounge themed to a tiki bar. It was designed in a Victorian style and contains flags, maps, rattan furniture, and wooden paneling. When the lounge opened in 2021, a friend of the restaurant's owners painted a mural within the bar. In addition, there are glass fishing trawlers and fish mounted onto various surfaces. A dumbwaiter connects the second floor with the ground-level kitchen.

== Cuisine ==
Gage and Tollner's early menu consisted of seafood, meat chops, and steaks; the restaurant originally did not serve roasted or fried dishes. Seafood was prepared in a wide variety of ways and cooked right in front of the guests. To ensure that the restaurant's food was of high quality, hard coal was used to boil dishes; a 1956 news article noted that the restaurant used 12 short tons (11 long tons; 11 t) of anthracite per month. In addition, foods were purchased in small amounts to ensure freshness, and they were cooked to order. Recipes for some of the restaurant's meals were featured in a 1982 cookbook by the Master Chefs Institute. Although the original iteration of Gage & Tollner was generally willing to swap out ingredients if diners had dietary restrictions, some items could not be substituted, such as skim milk in place of whole milk, or margarine in place of butter.

The Los Angeles Times wrote in 2001 that, at the beginning of the 20th century, the restaurant "sold oysters fried three ways, stewed five ways and broiled six ways". Seafood could be served as bisque, fricassee, fritters, or patties. A menu from 1919 listed twenty-four ways that Saddle Rock oysters could be prepared, while menus from the 1940s and 1950s listed dozens of oyster, soft-clam, littleneck clam, and cherrystone clam dishes. The Albany Times Union wrote in 1942 that the menu was six pages long. By the 1960s and 1970s, there were large numbers of meat entrees, salads, potato dishes, and vegetable dishes in addition to the wide variety of seafood servings. Gage and Tollner also had an extensive wine collection in the mid-20th century, but it did not generally stock rare wines. As late as 1981, the restaurant also had only three frozen dishes on its menu. Waiters showed the steak to the diners before broiling it, and meat dishes were accompanied by French fries. When Ed Dewey operated the restaurant, all diners received champagne when they finished eating.

Gage and Tollner was primarily a seafood restaurant in the 1980s; by the end of that decade, it served dishes such as clam bellies; she-crab soup; coleslaw; chicken with mushrooms and vegetables; Smithfield ham; crab cakes; and pan-fried quails. Other courses included egg dishes, fried rock shrimp, BBQ ribs, and brisket. There was a California wine menu with à la carte dishes. The desserts included bitter chocolate souffle with whipped cream, in addition to strawberry preserves and sweet corn pudding. When Marvin James became the restaurant's chef in 1996, he introduced new dishes such as lobster sausage, fricassee of Florida gulf shrimp, and fried chicken, and the restaurant continued to serve seafood and Southern food. Gage and Tollner's menu at the time included chicken dishes, dumplings, oysters, and grilled vegetables. as well as desserts like chocolate truffle cake and dessert sorbet. In the early 2000s, dishes included an appetizer named "Oysters Diamond Jim Brady", as well as entrees like T-bone steak and rack of lamb.

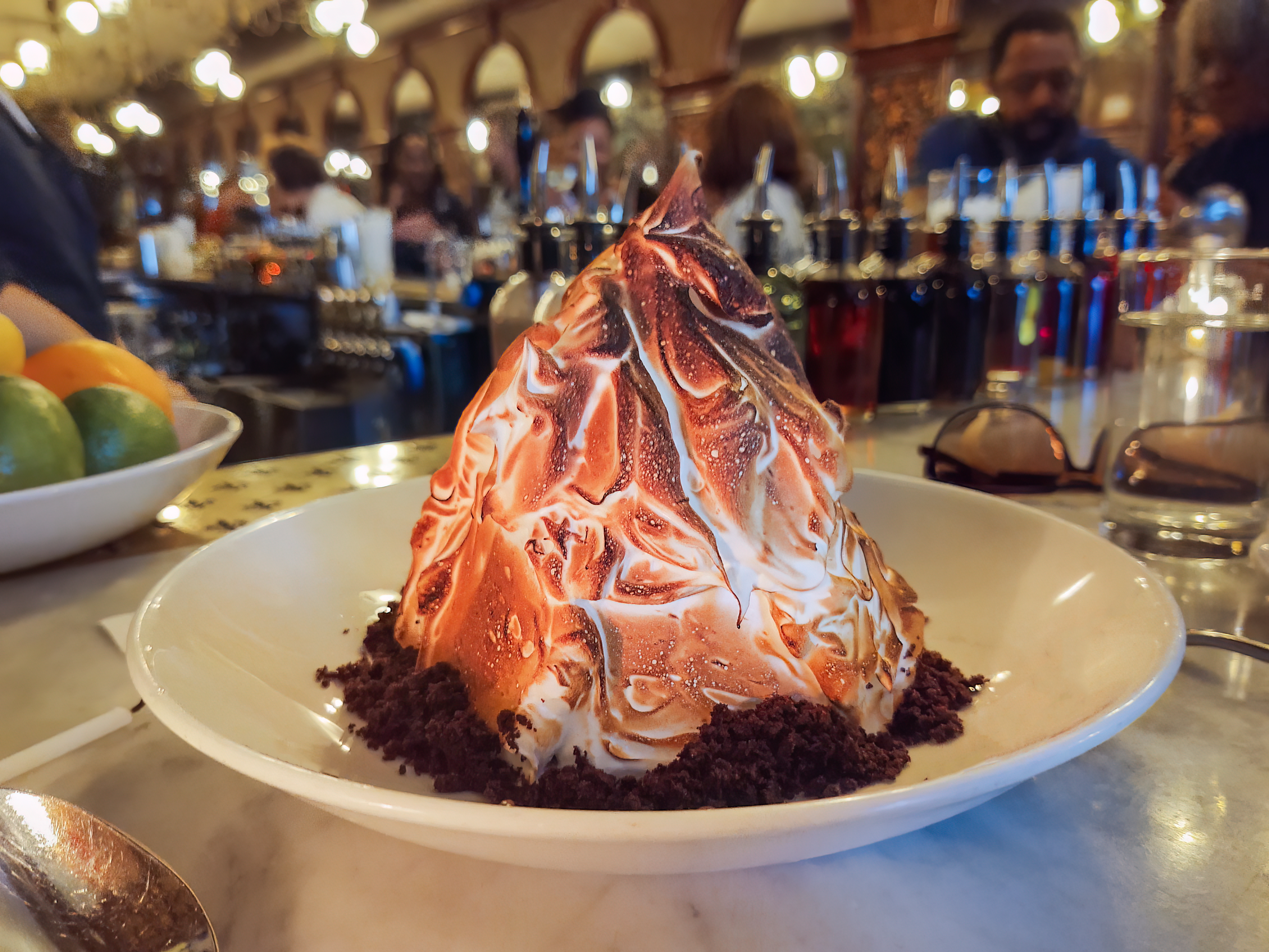
Mint, maraschino cherry, and dark chocolate Baked Alaska in 2023

After the restaurant reopened in 2021, it served seven cocktails and numerous types of seafood, including oysters, caviar, shellfish, clams, and chilled lobsters. The menu included steaks such as ribeye on the bone, as well as several types of salads, crab soup, chicken-liver pâté. Some of the dishes, such as Charlestonian crab soup and fried chicken with hush puppies, were intended as throwbacks to the cuisine served at the restaurant in the late 1980s and early 1990s, under the tenure of Edna Lewis. Other dishes, including clams with bacon and kimchi butter, were inspired by Kim's Korean ancestry. Desserts included baked Alaska, ice cream with cheese, as well as cakes and tarts. The Sunken Harbor Club sold cocktails, bar snacks, and two types of dinner packages.

== Clientele and traditions ==
In the early 20th century, Gage and Tollner attracted customers like businessmen Diamond Jim Brady, C. K. G. Billings, and Alfred Gwynne Vanderbilt; clergyman Henry Ward Beecher; newspaper editor Theodore Tilton; mayors Frederick A. Schroeder and William Jay Gaynor; New York governor Al Smith; author Truman Capote; singer Nora Bayes; and actors Fanny Brice, Jimmy Durante, Mae West, Marie Dressler, and Lillian Russell. Members of the Brooklyn Dodgers baseball team also ate at the restaurant. By the early 1990s, the restaurant attracted guests such as politician Wilson Goode and publisher John F. Kennedy Jr. According to the New York Herald Tribune, politicians who ate at the restaurant tended to separate themselves by political party. Democrats tended to sit on the west or right side of the dining room, while Republicans sat on the east or left side. Although the restaurant had a casual dress code, "short shorts" were banned. Ike Gaskill, a head waiter from 1900 to his death in 1960, memorized the names of over 5,000 customers, including some who had visited only a few times.

Waiters' uniforms consisted of white aprons and black jackets. All waitstaff wore bars, stars, and eagles on their uniforms, which indicated how many years they had been working at the restaurant, a tradition that dated to at least the late 19th century. Each staff member added a bar to their uniform for every year they had worked at Gage and Tollner. The uniforms were also decorated with stars, which represented every 5 years of service, and eagles, which represented every 25 years of service. (Note: Sometimes incorrectly cited as 10 years) Gaskill had a double gold bar indicating his status as headwaiter, as well as two eagles. By the early 2000s, the insignia no longer accurately represented waiters' tenures: the New York Times cited a waiter who had worked at Gage and Tollner for one month but was wearing a jacket that indicated 20 years of service.

Waiters formerly carried plates on their arms, but they used trays by the 1990s. The restaurant originally did not use tablecloths; instead, dishes were placed directly on the mahogany tables, and napkins were provided for guests. The restaurant continued its tradition of giving separate linen napkins to each diner through the 1960s, but the tables were covered with white linen by the 1980s. In addition, during its first century of operation, Gage and Tollner had a pair of cats on its property. Tollner personally fed the cats on Sundays when the restaurant was closed.

== Reception ==
=== Architectural ===
Of the restaurant's architecture, Alice Smith of Women's Wear Daily said in 1971 that the decorations "evoke a genuine, rather than decorator's, vision of the era of Diamond Jim Brady, once a regular customer". Paul Goldberger of the Times wrote in 1979 that other restaurants "come off as showy and false; Gage & Tollner—quiet, graceful, with never a detail exaggerated—is the real thing. ... The landmark facade is an attractive, although not particularly unusual, Italianate building dating from the eighteen-seventies in the style of many of the city's brownstones." Another Times writer called the restaurant "probably the most celebrated" New York City landmark in which to eat, while food critic Mimi Sheraton called it "by far the city's most beautifully intact landmark restaurant".

New York Daily News writer Joan Shepard described the restaurant's atmosphere as "grand but [not] stuffy" in 1976, and another reporter from the same paper called Gage and Tollner "the original theme restaurant" in 1996. In 2000, a writer for The Boston Globe said Gage and Tollner "still looks as it did when Queen Victoria was on the throne, right down to the gaslight chandeliers and the beautifully restored, 100-foot-long mirrored dining room." A Times critic praised the food and decor in 2001, saying Chirico's renovation had "given it real luster that is all the more surprising when you come upon it next to a Wiz store on the seedy Fulton Mall".

=== Cuisine and service ===
==== Original restaurant ====
The Times Union wrote in 1917: "The persistent popularity of Gage and Tollner's, despite its rigid adherence to old-fashioned rules and customs, indicates that there is still among us a great part of the population that likes to eat without the thrills of the cabaret and thrills of the string orchestra, if only the food is of the best quality and the service polite, attentive, and efficient." A critic for the Brooklyn Daily Eagle wrote in 1934, "When we say a visit to this chop and chowder house is an epicurean treat we are putting it mildly", while a critic for local newspaper The Tablet wrote in 1937 that the restaurant's "clams have never been so good, and you may lay to that". In 1952, one magazine dubbed the restaurant "one of the world's best seafood restaurants". Holiday magazine also gave Gage and Tollner a dining distinction award on several consecutive years in the 1950s and 1960s.

Alice Smith wrote in 1971 that "the seafood is deliciously diversified" and that "desserts are Americana at its best", while Joan Shepard wrote in 1976 that the restaurant was "recommended without qualification" despite being "moderately expensive". Mimi Sheraton rated the restaurant as "good" in 1979. Although Sheraton criticized the potatoes, salads, and wine list and found many of the dishes to be lacking flavor, seasoning, or warmth, she praised other dishes such as the broiled fish and thick mutton chop. A 1983 article from the New York Amsterdam News stated: "This is an old-fashioned restaurant where everything is served extra, but it's well worth the cost." The Hartford Courant wrote in 1985 that "the menu is a nostalgic roster of long-forgotten dishes once popular in the luxurious eating establishments of the mid-Atlantic coast, and a writer for the South China Morning Post said the same year: "It is the food that should be declared a historic landmark."

After Lewis was hired as chef in 1988, Bryan Miller wrote: "A recent visit found the menu in transition and still uneven—the traditional menu is supplemented by daily specials that are Mrs. Lewis's contributions." A critic for Newsday wrote in 1989 that the relic menu was "antiquated" and best avoided and that, "except for the broiled clam bellies and some of the broiled fish, this menu is an excellent example of why cooking shouldn't be landmarked". The Times wrote in 1992 that the dining room was "delightfully democratic: No good tables, no bad tables, just long rows of symmetrically arranged white linen, like a college dining hall." In 1994, the restaurant received a Distinguished Restaurants of North America award.

After the restaurant's renovation in 1995, a writer for The Village Voice criticized the menu and said: "Even if the new Gage & Tollner looks a little bit like Eleanor Roosevelt in Speedos, I know my old classic is in there somewhere." Conversely, a Times reporter wrote that "It's not likely to be the best lobster or the best steak you'll ever eat, but at Gage & Tollner it's the history and beauty, not the food, that's really the point." According to Nation's Restaurant News writer Milford Prewitt, Gage and Tollner was one of the "romantic dining environments in the city, contributing to its ranking as one of the top restaurants for marriage proposals". Another writer, L.J. Davis, said: "You go to Gage's (as many regulars call it) for the experience, the way you go to heaven for the climate and to hell for the company."

==== Modern-day restaurant ====
After the 2021 reopening, Times restaurant critic Pete Wells wrote that "everything about this reincarnation glows... the whole restaurant radiates confidence, capability and relevance." A reviewer for Grub Street stated of the reopened restaurant: "thanks to a series of diligent owners, the rituals of the place survived—oysters and clam-belly broil, beefsteaks with all the trimmings, ice cream for dessert—the way they do in an old church as the neighborhood changes around it."

A critic for The New Yorker wrote in 2022: "Now as then, the restaurant is a chophouse..." The Michelin Guide wrote: "Seafood towers, big steaks, crab cakes and a superb platter of fried chicken with cornmeal fritters take their cues from the legendary Edna Lewis ... Dessert is essential and all of them, from the coconut layer cake to the baked Alaska, will make for a fond farewell. In 2023, Wells ranked Gage and Tollner as the city's 43rd best restaurant.

== See also ==
- List of restaurants in New York City
- List of New York City Designated Landmarks in Brooklyn
- National Register of Historic Places listings in Brooklyn
