= List of New York City Designated Landmarks in Brooklyn =

The New York City Landmarks Preservation Commission (LPC), formed in 1965, is the New York City governmental commission that administers the city's Landmarks Preservation Law. Since its founding, it has designated over a thousand landmarks, classified into four categories: individual landmarks, interior landmarks, scenic landmarks, and historic districts.

The New York City borough of Brooklyn contains numerous landmarks designated by the LPC, including four scenic landmarks and several interior landmarks and historic districts. The following is an incomplete list. Some of these are also National Historic Landmark (NHL) sites, and NHL status is noted where known.

source: ;; date listed is date of designation;

== Historic districts ==
| Landmark Name | Date Designated |
|---|---|
| Albemarle-Kenmore Terraces Historic District | July 11, 1978 |
| Alice and Agate Courts Historic District | February 10, 2009 |
| Bay Ridge Parkway-Doctors' Row Historic District | June 25, 2019 |
| Bedford Historic District | December 8, 2015 |
| Boerum Hill Historic District | November 20, 1973 ; extension: June 26, 2018 |
| Borough Hall Skyscraper Historic District | September 13, 2011 |
| Brooklyn Academy of Music Historic District | September 26, 1978 |
| Brooklyn Heights Historic District | November 23, 1965 |
| Carroll Gardens Historic District | September 25, 1973 |
| Central Sunset Park Historic District | June 18, 2019 |
| Chester Court Historic District | December 16, 2014 |
| Clinton Hill Historic District | November 10, 1981 |
| Cobble Hill Historic District | December 20, 1969 ; extension: June 7, 1988 |
| Crown Heights North Historic District | April 24, 2007 ; II: June 28, 2011 |
| Ditmas Park Historic District | August 29, 1981 |
| DUMBO Historic District | December 18, 2007 |
| East 25th Street Historic District | November 17, 2020 |
| Eberhard Faber Pencil Company Historic District | October 30, 2007 |
| Fillmore Place Historic District | May 12, 2009 |
| Fiske Terrace – Midwood Park Historic District | March 18, 2008 |
| Fort Greene Historic District | September 26, 1978 |
| Fulton Ferry Historic District | June 28, 1977 |
| Greenpoint Historic District | May 7, 1991 |
| Melrose Parkside Historic District | December 13, 2022 |
| Ocean on the Park Historic District | October 27, 2009 |
| Park Place Historic District | June 26, 2012 |
| Park Slope Historic District | July 17, 1973 |
| Prospect Lefferts Gardens Historic District | October 9, 1979 |
| Prospect Heights Historic District | June 23, 2009 |
| Prospect Park South Historic District | February 8, 1979 |
| Stuyvesant Heights Historic District | September 14, 1971 |
| Sunset Park 50th Street Historic District | June 18, 2019 |
| Sunset Park North Historic District | June 18, 2019 |
| Sunset Park South Historic District | June 18, 2019 |
| Vinegar Hill Historic District | January 14, 1997 |
| Wallabout Historic District | July 12, 2011 |
| Willoughby–Hart Historic District | June 25, 2024 |

== Individual landmarks ==
=== 1–9 ===
| Landmark Name | Image | Date Designated |
|---|---|---|
| 14th Regiment Armory | | April 14, 1998 |
| Former 18th Police Precinct Station House and Stable | | April 12, 1983 |
| 183-195 Broadway Building 40.71°N 73.962°W | | December 13, 2016 |
| 19th Police Precinct Station House and Stable (Former) | | September 21, 1973 |
| 238 President Street House, Carroll Gardens 40.6820°N 73.9977°W | | September 18, 2018 |
| 23rd Regiment Armory | | March 8, 1977 |
| 271 Ninth Street House (William B. Cronyn House) | | July 11, 1978 |
| 8200 Narrows Avenue House 40°37′41″N 74°2′18″W | | March 8, 1988 |
| 83rd Police Precinct Station House and Stable | | March 8, 1977 |

=== A–M ===
| Landmark Name | Image | Date Designated |
|---|---|---|
| Alhambra Apartments | | March 18, 1986 |
| American Society for the Prevention of Cruelty to Animals (ASPCA) Brooklyn Office, Shelter, and Garage (233 Butler Street) | | October 29, 2019 |
| Antioch (Greene Avenue) Baptist Church and Church House | | November 20, 1990 |
| Astral Apartments | | June 28, 1983 |
| Avenue H Station House | | June 29, 2004 |
| Bennet-Farrell-Feldman House, 119 95th St, Bay Ridge 40°37′1″N 74°2′16″W | | August 3, 1999 |
| F.J. Berlenbach House, 174 Meserole St, Greenpoint 40°42′29″N 73°56′32.7″W | | May 11, 2004 |
| Betsy Head Play Center, Dumont Avenue and Thomas Boyland Street (Hopkinson Avenue), Brownsville 40°39′47″N 73°54′44″W | | September 16, 2008 |
| Boathouse on the Lullwater of the Lake in Prospect Park | | October 14, 1965 |
| Boys High School | | September 23, 1975 |
| Brooklyn Botanic Garden Laboratory Administration Building 40°40′3″N 73°57′44″W | | March 13, 2007 |
| Brooklyn Borough Hall | | April 19, 1966 |
| Brooklyn Bridge | | August 24, 1967 |
| Brooklyn Central Office, Bureau of Fire Communications | | April 19, 1966 |
| Brooklyn City Railroad Company Building, 8 Cadman Plaza West | | February 20, 1973 |
| Brooklyn Clay Retort and Fire Brick Works Storehouse, 76 Van Dyke St, Red Hook 40°40′30″N 74°0′48″W | | December 18, 2001 |
| Brooklyn Edison Company Building | | June 18, 2024 |
| Brooklyn Institute of Arts and Sciences (Brooklyn Museum) | | March 15, 1966 |
| Brooklyn Naval Hospital, in the Brooklyn Navy Yard 40°41′55″N 73°57′53″W | | October 14, 1965 |
| Brooklyn Public Library, Central Building | | June 17, 1997 |
| Brooklyn Public Library, DeKalb Branch, 790 Bushwick Ave 40°41′41″N 73°55′42″W | | May 18, 2004 |
| Brooklyn Public Library, Park Slope Branch | | October 13, 1998 |
| Brooklyn Public Library, Williamsburgh Branch (240 Division Avenue) 40°42′25″N 73°57′27″W | | June 15, 1999 |
| Brooklyn Rapid Transit Company (BRT) Central Power Station Engine House (153 2nd Street) | | October 29, 2019 |
| Brooklyn Trust Company Building (Chemical Bank Building) (177 Montague Street) | | June 25, 1996 |
| Brooklyn Union Gas Company Headquarters (St. Francis College) (180 Remsen Street) | | May 10, 2011 |
| Carroll Street Bridge | | September 29, 1987 |
| Childs Restaurant Building (Coney Island USA, 3014 West 12th Street, Coney Island) 40°34′30.5″N 73°58′47″W | | January 11, 2011 |
| Childs Restaurant Building (Former) (2102 Boardwalk, Coney Island) | | February 4, 2003 |
| Hans S. Christian Memorial Kindergarten (236 President Street, Carroll Gardens) 40.682°N 73.998°W | | September 18, 2018 |
| Church of St. Luke and St. Matthew (Episcopal) (520 Clinton Avenue, Clinton Hill) | | May 12, 1981 |
| Coe House (1128 East 34th Street, East Midwood) 40°37′41″N 73°56′36″W | | November 19, 1969 |
| Coignet Building (360 Third Ave, Gowanus,) 40°40′30.1″N 73°59′17.1″W | | June 13, 2006 |
| Colored School No. 3 (Former) (Public School 69) (270 Union Ave, Williamsburg) 40°42′31″N 73°57′2″W | Colored School 3 Brooklyn | January 13, 1998 |
| Commandant's House, Quarters A | | October 14, 1965 |
| The Cyclone | | June 12, 1988 |
| Dime Savings Bank | | July 19, 1994 |
| Dime Savings Bank of Williamsburgh, 209 Havemeyer Street, Williamsburg | | March 27, 2018 |
| Doering-Bohack House, 1090 Greene Avenue 40°41′32″N 73°55′28.5″W | | September 30, 2014 |
| Dry Dock#1, Brooklyn Navy Yard | | September 23, 1975 |
| Duffield Street Houses (Johnson Street Houses) | | April 24, 2001 |
| East New York Savings Bank (1117 Eastern Parkway) | | March 8, 2016 |
| George B. and Susan Elkins House (1375 Dean St, Crown Heights) 40°40′36″N 73°56′35″W | | October 24, 2006 |
| James W. and Lucy S. Elwell House 70 Lefferts Pl, Clinton Hill, Brooklyn 40°40′52″N 73°57′39″W | | December 12, 2006 |
| Emmanuel Baptist Church | | November 12, 1968 |
| Empire State Dairy Company Building, 2840 Atlantic Avenue 40.6766°N 73.889°W | | December 7, 2012 |
| Engine Company No. 252 (617 Central Avenue) 40°41′18.8″N 73°54′29.3″W | | October 19, 1995 |
| Engine Company No. 253 (2425 86th Street) 40°35′56.3″N 73°59′18.5″W | | September 15, 1998 |
| Erasmus Hall Academy (Erasmus Hall Museum) | | March 15, 1966 |
| Erasmus Hall High School | | June 24, 2003 |
| Federal Building and Post Office | | July 19, 1966 |
| First Free Congregational Church (Polytechnic Institute Building) | | November 24, 1981 |
| Flatbush District No. 1 School (Public School 90) | | November 20, 2007 |
| Flatbush Dutch Reformed Church | | March 15, 1966 ; expansion: January 9, 1979 |
| Flatbush Sears 40°38′42″N 73°57′27″W | | May 15, 2012 |
| Flatbush Town Hall | | October 16, 1973 |
| Flatlands Reformed Church | | July 19, 1966 |
| Fort Hamilton Officers' Club (Casemate Fort) 40°36′32″N 74°1′56″W | | March 8, 1977 |
| Friends Meeting House | | October 27, 1981 |
| Gage and Tollner | | November 12, 1974 |
| Girls High School | | June 28, 1983 |
| Gowanus Canal Flushing Tunnel Pumping Station and Gate House (196 Butler Street) 40.682°N 73.9875°W | | October 29, 2019 |
| Grecian Shelter | | December 10, 1968 |
| Green-Wood Cemetery Gates | | April 19, 1966 |
| Green-Wood Cemetery Fort Hamilton Parkway Entrance and Chapel | | April 12, 2016 |
| Hanson Place Seventh Day Adventist Church | | October 13, 1970 |
| Havemeyers & Elder Filter, Pan & Finishing House (Domino Sugar Refinery) | | September 25, 2007 |
| Hecla Iron Works Building, 100-108 North 11th Street 40°43′15″N 73°57′25″W | | June 8, 2004 |
| Historic Street Lampposts, Bay Ridge | | June 17, 1997 |
| Hubbard House, 2138 McDonald Ave. 40°36′1″N 73°58′23″W | | January 13, 2009 |
| Peter P. and Rosa M. Huberty House, 1019 Bushwick Avenue | | October 24, 2017 |
| Houses on Hunterfly Road, 1698–1708 (even) Bergen Street | | August 18, 1970, , , |
| Imperial Apartments | | March 18, 1986 |
| Kings County Savings Bank | | March 15, 1966 |
| Lefferts Homestead | | June 21, 1966 |
| Lefferts-Laidlaw House, 136 Clinton Avenue, Wallabout | | November 13, 2001 |
| Lesbian Herstory Archives | | November 22, 2022 |
| Dr. Maurice T. Lewis House, 404 55th Street, Sunset Park 40.4435°N 74.0155°W | | March 6, 2018 |
| Lincoln Club (Mechanics Temple), Independent United Order of Mechanics of the Western Hemisphere | | May 12, 1981 |
| Litchfield Villa | | September 17, 2013 |
| Long Island Business College (formerly Public School 166) | | March 15, 1966 |
| Long Island Headquarters of the New York Telephone Company (Former), 375 Bridge Street | | September 21, 2004 |
| Hendrick I. Lott House | | October 3, 1989 |
| F.W.I.L. Lundy Brothers Restaurant Building | | March 3, 1992 |
| Magen David Synagogue | | April 24, 2001 |
| Magnolia grandiflora | | May 12, 1970 |
| McCarren Play Center | | July 24, 2007 |
| Montauk Paint Manufacturing Company Building (170 2nd Avenue) | | October 29, 2019 |

=== N–Z ===
| Landmark Name | Image | Date Designated |
|---|---|---|
| A. I. Namm & Son Department Store (450-458 Fulton Street at Hoyt Street) | | March 15, 2005 |
| National Title Guaranty Company Building (185 Montague Street) | | January 24, 2017 |
| New England Congregational Church (Light of the World (La Luz del Mundo) Church) (179 South 9th Street) | | November 24, 1981 |
| New Lots Reformed Church | | July 19, 1966 |
| New Utrecht Reformed Church and Parish House | | March 15, 1966 ; expansion: January 13, 1998 |
| New Utrecht Reformed Dutch Church Cemetery 40°36′39″N 74°0′21″W | | January 13, 1998 |
| New York and Long Island Coignet Stone Company Building | | June 27, 2006 |
| New York and New Jersey Telephone and Telegraph Building (Former) | | June 29, 2004 |
| Offerman Building | | March 15, 2005 |
| Old Brooklyn Fire Headquarters | | April 19, 1966 |
| Old Gravesend Cemetery (Van Sicklen Family Cemetery) | | March 23, 1976 |
| Parachute Jump | | May 23, 1989 |
| People's Trust Company Building (181 Montague Street) | | January 24, 2017 |
| Pratt Institute Faculty Rowhouses | | December 22, 1981 |
| Pratt Institute Library | | December 22, 1981 |
| Pratt Institute Main Building | | December 22, 1981 |
| Public Bath No. 7 | | September 11, 1984 |
| Public School 108 (200 Linwood Street, Cypress Hills) 40°40′52″N 73°53′3.5″W | | February 3, 1981 |
| Public School 116 (Elizabeth Farrell School) (515 Knickerbocker Avenue, Bushwick) 40.69806°N 73.91655°W | | June 25, 2002 |
| Public School 15 Annex 40.686213°N 73.979624°W | | April 7, 2026 |
| Public School 34 40°43′34″N 73°57′0″W | | April 12, 1983 |
| Public School 39 (417 6th Ave, Park Slope) 40°40′7.5″N 73°58′59″W | | March 8, 1977 |
| Public School 65K (158 Richmond St, Cypress Hills) 40°41′0″N 73°54′37″W | | February 3, 1981 |
| Public School 71K (Beth Jacob School) | | February 3, 1981 |
| Public School 73 (241 Macdougal Street, East NY) 40°40′50″N 73°54′38.5″W | | September 11, 1984 |
| Public School 86 (Irvington School) | | April 23, 1991 |
| Public School 9 (also known as Public School 111, 249 Sterling Place) | | January 10, 1978 |
| Public School 9 Annex (251 Sterling Place) | | January 10, 1978 |
| John Rankin House (440 Clinton Street, Carroll Gardens) | | July 14, 1970 |
| Red Hook Play Center (Sol Goldman Pool) | | November 18, 2008 |
| Reformed Church of South Bushwick | | March 19, 1968 |
| Renaissance Apartments (480 Nostrand Avenue) | | March 18, 1986 |
| Royal Castle Apartments (26 Gates Avenue & Clinton Avenue) | | December 22, 1981 |
| Russian Orthodox Cathedral of the Transfiguration of Our Lord | | November 19, 1969 |
| Elias Hubbard Ryder House (1926 East 28th Street) 40°36′15″N 73°56′41″W | | March 23, 1976 |
| Shore Theater (Coney Island Theater) | | December 14, 2010 |
| Somers Brothers Tinware Factory (later American Can Company, 238-246 3rd Street) 40.6747°N 73.9878°W | | October 29, 2019 |
| St. Barbara's Roman Catholic Church (138 Bleecker Street) | | December 13, 2016 |
| St. Bartholemew's Church (1227 Pacific St & Bedford Avenue) | | March 19, 1974 |
| St. Casimir's Roman Catholic Church (Paul Robeson Theater, 40 Greene Avenue) | | October 25, 2011 |
| St. George's Protestant Episcopal Church | | January 11, 1977 |
| St. Mary's Episcopal Church | | October 27, 1981 |
| St. Paul's Evangelical Lutheran Church, Sunday School and Parsonage (334 South 5th Street) 40°42′30″N 73°57′22″W | | April 12, 2011 |
| Shelter Pavilion and Attached Buildings, Monsignor McGolrick Park | | October 18, 1966 |
| Sidewalk Clock, 735 Manhattan Avenue | | August 25, 1981 |
| Smith, Gray & Company Building (103 Broadway) 40°42′38″N 73°57′53.5″W | | June 7, 2005 |
| Soldiers' and Sailors' Memorial Arch | | October 16, 1973 |
| South Congregational Church, Chapel, Ladies Parlor, and Rectory | | March 23, 1982 |
| State Street Houses (290–324 (even) and 291–299 (odd) State Street) | | November 20, 1973, , , , , , , , , , , , , , , , , , , , , , |
| Steele House (200 Lafayette Avenue) 40°41′15.7″N 73°58′6.6″W | | March 19, 1968 |
| Stoothoff-Baxter-Kouwenhoven House | | March 23, 1976 |
| Studebaker Building | | December 19, 2000 |
| Sunset Park Courthouse (Former) | | June 26, 2001 |
| Sunset Play Center | | July 24, 2007 |
| Surgeon's House, Brooklyn Navy Yard, Flushing Avenue opposite Ryerson Avenue 40°41′58″N 73°57′55″W | | November 9, 1976 |
| Thomson Meter Company Building (New York Eskimo Pie Corporation Building) (100-110 Bridge Street) 40°42′4″N 73°59′6″W | | February 10, 2004 |
| Harriet and Thomas Truesdell House (227 Duffield Street) 40°41′29″N 73°59′03″W | | February 2, 2021 |
| Van Sicklen House (27 Gravesend Neck Road) 40.5955°N 73.9743°W | | April 12, 2016 |
| John and Elizabeth Truslow House (96 Brooklyn Avenue) 40°42′36.3″N 73°56′40″W | | September 16, 1997 |
| Van Nuyse-Magaw House (1041 East 22nd Street) 40°37′36.5″N 73°57′15.5″W | | February 11, 1969 |
| Weir Greenhouse (McGovern-Weir Greenhouse) 40°39′32.8″N 73°59′45.9″W | | April 13, 1982 |
| William Ulmer Brewery | | May 11, 2010 |
| Williamsburg Houses | | June 24, 2003 |
| Williamsburgh Savings Bank Building (175 Broadway) | | May 17, 1966 |
| Williamsburgh Savings Bank Tower | | November 15, 1977 |
| Williamsburgh Trust Company Building (later Fifth District Magistrates' Court / later Holy Trinity Cathedral), 177-185 South 5th Street 40.7107°N 73.961°W | | June 28, 2016 |
| The Wonder Wheel | | May 23, 1989 |
| Pieter Claesen Wyckoff House | | October 14, 1965 |
| Wyckoff-Bennett Homestead | | January 17, 1968 |

== Interior landmarks ==
| Landmark name | Image | Date listed (Note: The number below each date is the number assigned to each location by the Landmarks Preservation Commission. The landmark designation report can be viewed by clicking the number.) (Note: For an interactive map, refer to "Discover New York City Landmarks". New York City Landmarks Preservation Commission – via ArcGIS.) | Location | Neighborhood | Description |
|---|---|---|---|---|---|
| IRT Subway System Underground Interior (Borough Hall station) | IRT Subway System Underground Interior (Borough Hall station) | October 23, 1979 (Note: Twelve subway stations are grouped under the "IRT Subway System Underground Interior" listing (LP-1096). The Borough Hall station is listed on its own.) (#1096) | Fulton Street and Court Street; 40°41′33″N 73°59′28″W | Downtown Brooklyn | Original interiors of a New York City Subway station built in 1908 and served by the 4 and 5 trains; also a National Registered Historic Place. |
| Brooklyn Trust Company (entrance vestibule and banking room interior) | | June 25, 1996 (#1906) | 177–179 Montague Street; 40°38′26″N 73°59′32″W | Brooklyn Heights | Also an exterior landmark and a National Registered Historic Place |
| Dime Savings Bank (entrance vestibule and banking room interior) | Dime Savings Bank (entrance vestibule and banking room interior) | June 25, 1996 (#1908) | 9 DeKalb Avenue; 40°41′25″N 73°58′57″W | Downtown Brooklyn | Also an exterior landmark |
| Gage and Tollner (dining room interior) | Gage and Tollner (dining room interior) | March 25, 1975 (#1908) | 372 Fulton Street; 40°41′29″N 73°59′16″W | Downtown Brooklyn | Also an exterior landmark and a National Registered Historic Place |
| Long Island Historical Society Building | Long Island Historical Society Building | March 23, 1982 (#1131) | 128 Pierrepont Street; 40°41′41″N 73°59′33″W | Brooklyn Heights | Also a National Historic Landmark and part of the Brooklyn Heights Historic District |
| Sunset Play Center Bath House (first floor interior) | Sunset Play Center Bath House (first floor interior) | July 24, 2007 (#2243) | 7th Avenue, between 41st and 44th Streets; 40°38′49″N 74°00′08″W | Sunset Park | Also an exterior landmark |
| Williamsburgh Savings Bank, Broadway (entrance vestibule and banking room interior) | Williamsburgh Savings Bank, Broadway (entrance vestibule and banking room interior) | June 25, 1996 (#1910) | 175 Broadway; 40°42′37″N 73°57′45″W | Williamsburg | Also an exterior landmark and a National Registered Historic Place |
| Williamsburgh Savings Bank, Hanson Place (entrance vestibule, lobby, banking room, mezzanine, and basement lobby interior) | Williamsburgh Savings Bank, Hanson Place (entrance vestibule, lobby, banking room, mezzanine, and basement lobby interior) | June 25, 1996 (#1909) | 1 Hanson Place; 40°41′08″N 73°58′40″W | Fort Greene | Also an exterior landmark and part of the Brooklyn Academy of Music Historic District |

== Scenic landmarks ==
| Landmark Name | Image | Date Designated |
|---|---|---|
| Coney Island (Riegelmann) Boardwalk | | May 15, 2018 |
| Eastern Parkway | | August 22, 1978 |
| Ocean Parkway | | January 28, 1975 |
| Prospect Park | | November 25, 1975 |

== See also ==
- National Register of Historic Places listings in Kings County, New York
- List of New York City Landmarks
