= New Lots Reformed Church and Cemetery =

Church in Brooklyn, New York

- U.S. National Register of Historic Places
- New York City Landmark
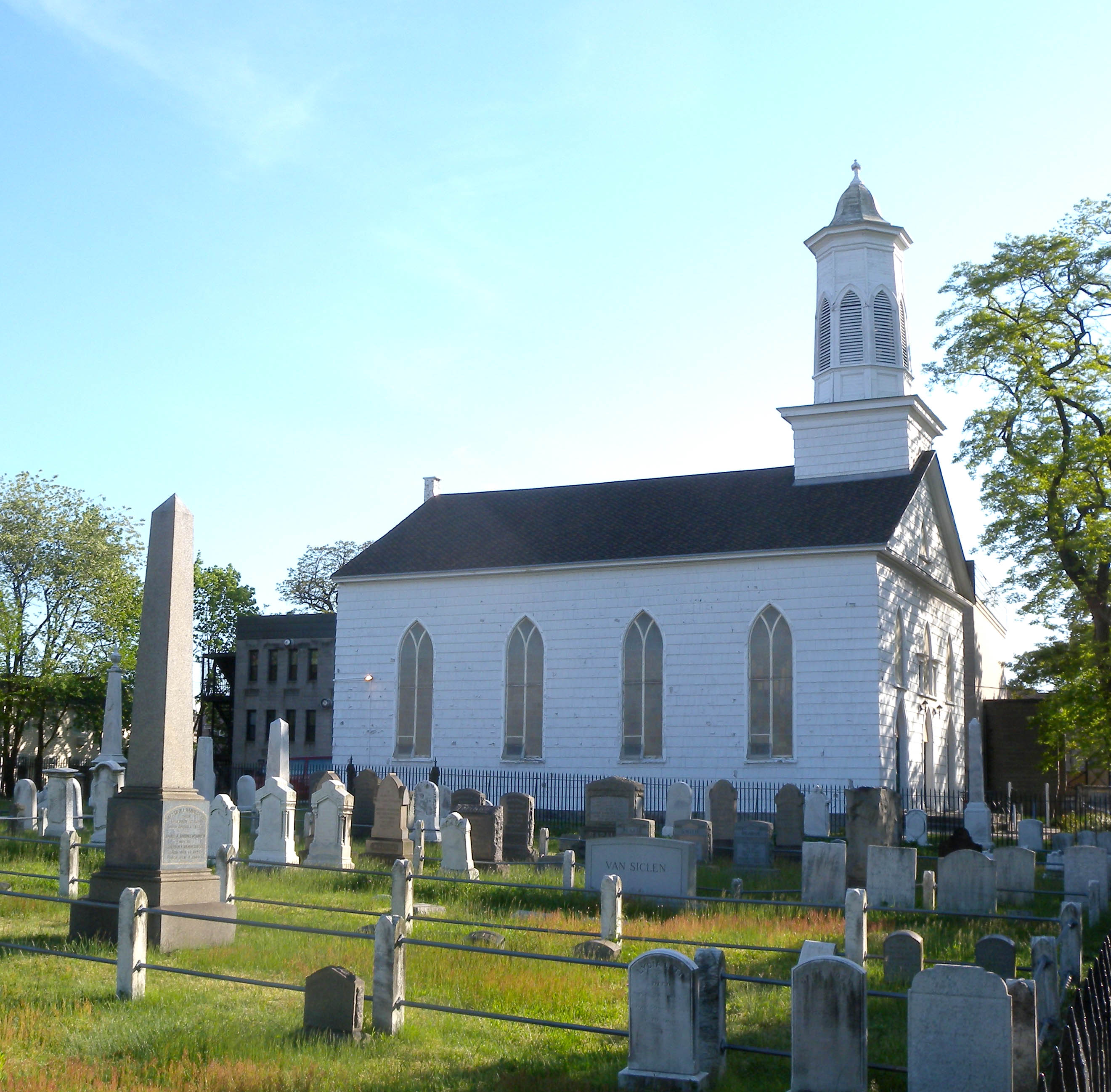

- Location within New York City Location within New York Location within the United States
- Location: 630 New Lots Ave., East New York, Brooklyn, New York City
- Coordinates: 40°39′53″N 73°53′08″W
- Area: 2 acres (0.81 ha)
- Built: 1824
- NRHP reference No.: 83001696
- NYCL No.: 0169

Significant dates
- Added to NRHP: May 19, 1983
- Designated NYCL: July 19, 1966

New Lots Reformed Church and Cemetery is a historic Dutch Reformed church and cemetery at 630 New Lots Avenue in the East New York neighborhood of Brooklyn in New York City. It was built in 1823–1824 and is a small, rectangular wood-frame building sheathed in clapboard. It has a pitched gable roof and sits on a rough stone foundation. Adjacent to the church is the cemetery divided into two sections. The older section dates to the 17th century and includes burials of Revolutionary War soldiers and slaves. The present cemetery was established in 1841.

It was listed on the National Register of Historic Places in 1983.

== See also ==
- List of New York City Designated Landmarks in Brooklyn
- National Register of Historic Places listings in Brooklyn
