= Old Gravesend Cemetery =

Historic cemetery in Brooklyn, New York

- U.S. National Register of Historic Places
- New York State Register of Historic Places
- New York City Landmark
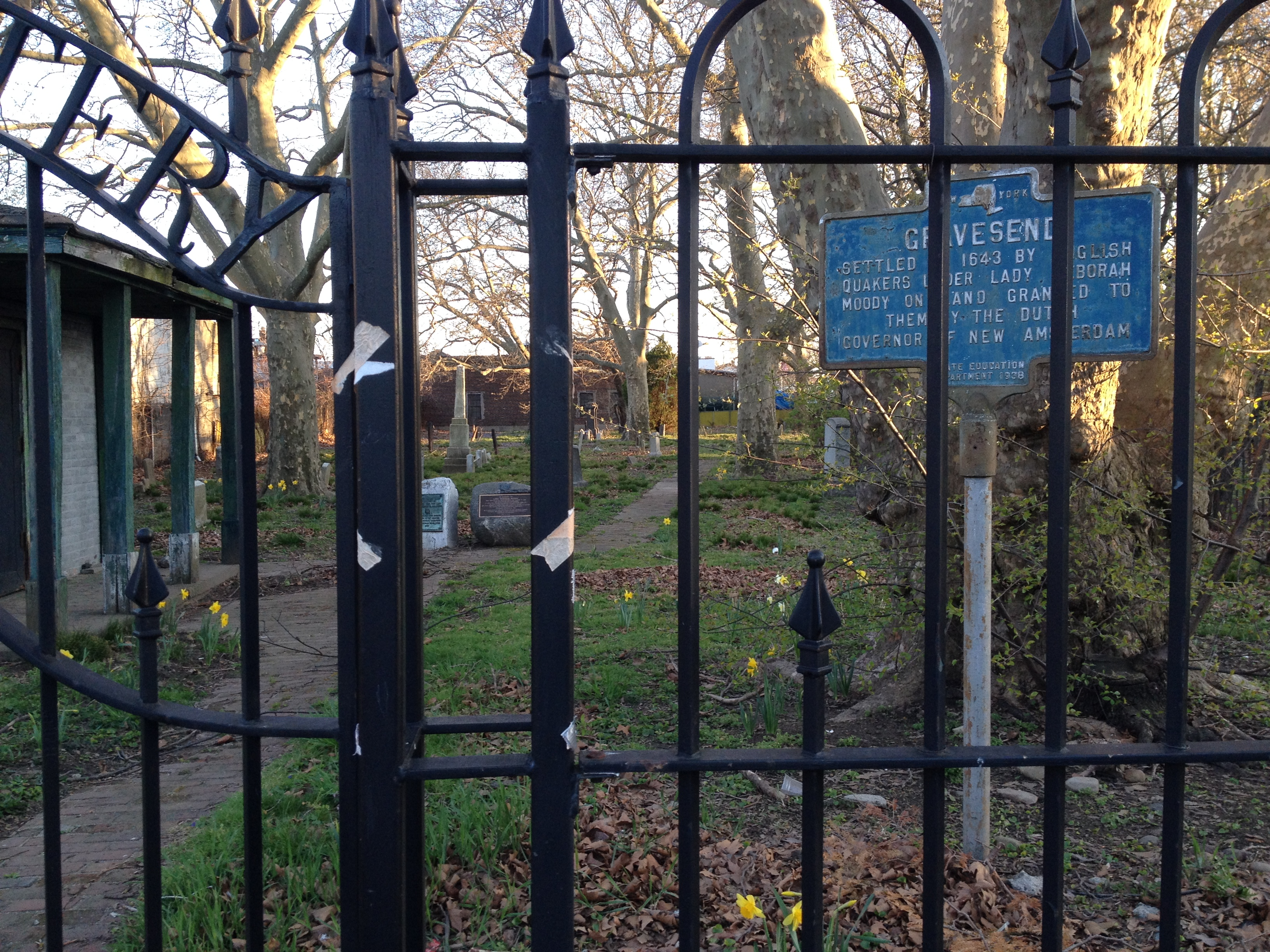

- Location within New York City Location within New York Location within the United States
- Location: Gravesend Neck Rd. and McDonald Ave., New York, New York
- Coordinates: 40°35′40″N 73°58′30″W
- Area: 1.6 acres (0.65 ha)
- Built: 1658
- NRHP reference No.: 80002635
- NYSRHP No.: 04701.000543
- NYCL No.: 0921

Significant dates
- Added to NRHP: September 17, 1980
- Designated NYSRHP: June 23, 1980
- Designated NYCL: March 23, 1976

Old Gravesend Cemetery is a historic cemetery at Gravesend Neck Road and McDonald Avenue in Gravesend, Brooklyn, New York, New York. The cemetery was founded about 1658 and contains the graves of a number of the original patentees and their families. Lady Deborah Moody, founder of Gravesend, is believed to be buried in the cemetery.

It was listed on the National Register of Historic Places in 1980.

== See also ==
- List of New York City Designated Landmarks in Brooklyn
- National Register of Historic Places listings in Brooklyn
