= Stoothoff–Baxter–Kouwenhaven House =

Historic house in Brooklyn, New York

- U.S. National Register of Historic Places
- New York State Register of Historic Places
- New York City Landmark
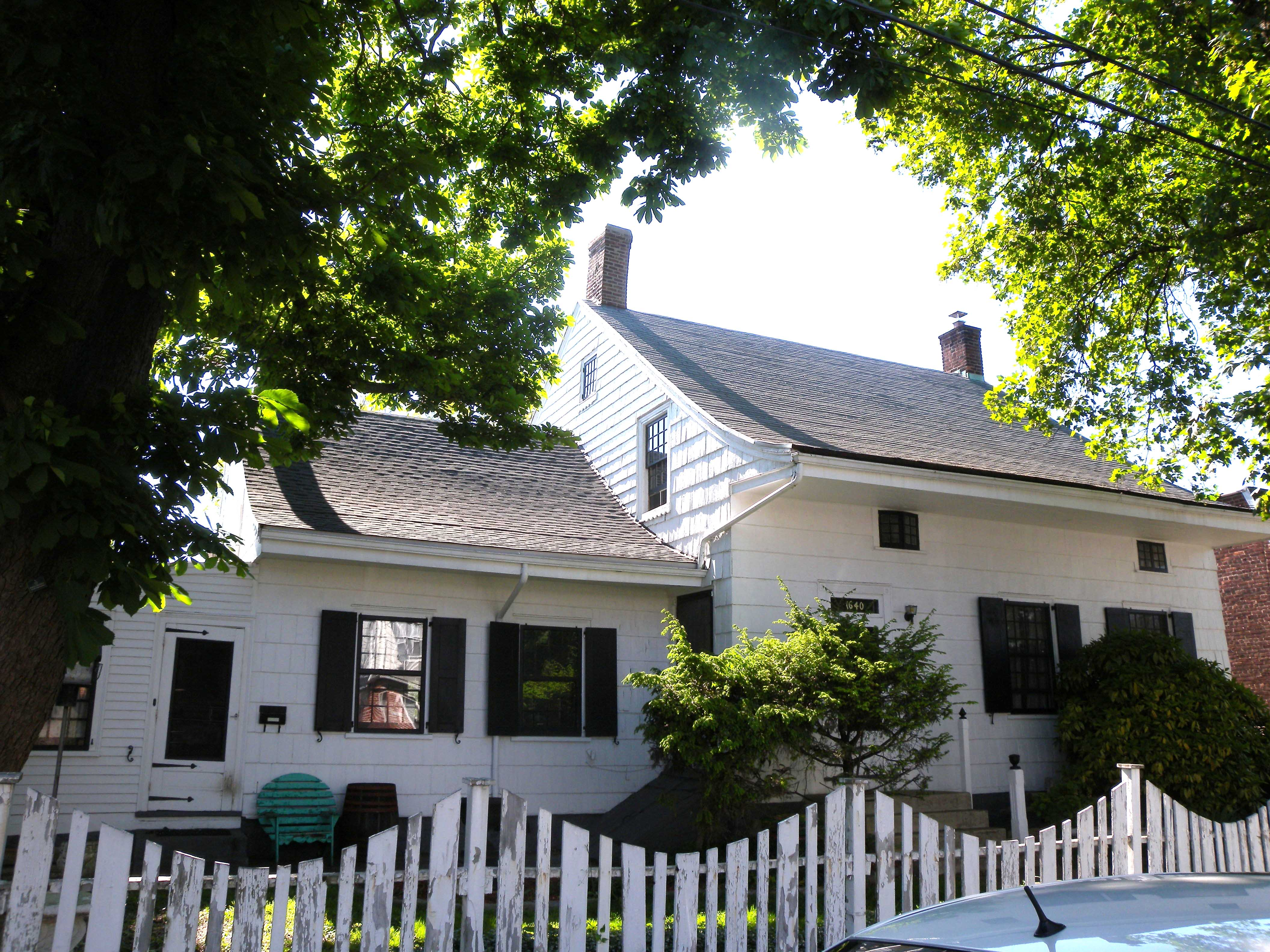
- Stoothoff–Baxter–Kouwenhaven House, May 2009

- Location within New York City Location within New York Location within the United States
- Location: 1640 E. 48th St., Brooklyn, New York
- Coordinates: 40°37′12″N 73°55′44″W
- Area: less than one acre
- Built: 1747
- Architectural style: Colonial
- NRHP reference No.: 82001184
- NYSRHP No.: 04701.002843
- NYCL No.: 0919

Significant dates
- Added to NRHP: November 14, 1982
- Designated NYSRHP: September 29, 1982
- Designated NYCL: March 23, 1976

Stoothoff–Baxter–Kouwenhaven House is a historic home located in Flatlands, Brooklyn, New York City. It is currently located at 1640 East 48th Street in Brooklyn.

== History ==
The original section was built in 1747 and the larger main portion dates to 1811. A kitchen wing was added in 1880. It is one and one half stories with steeply pitched gable roofs, curved projecting eaves, and end chimneys. The main entrance features a Dutch door. It was relocated in approximately 1900 to align with the new street grid.

One source states that the house "has actually been moved twice, probably by horse-drawn wagons. John Baxter describes the 1811 move in his diary".

The house was designated as a New York City Landmark in 1976, and was listed on the National Register of Historic Places in 1982.

== Residents ==
The house is named after a series of families who lived in it, from the time of its construction up until the 1920s. Its initial construction is believed to have been completed by an ancestor of Garret Stoothoff. The addition in 1811 was constructed by John Baxter, who married Garret Stoothoff's daughter and inherited the home in 1796. Baxter's ghost is rumoured to haunt the house. William Kouwenhoven married Abigail Baxter, daughter of John, and the house passed into that family's name.

== See also ==
- List of New York City Designated Landmarks in Brooklyn
- National Register of Historic Places listings in Kings County, New York
