= Iglesia Pentecostal La Luz del Mundo =

Church in Brooklyn, New York

- New England Congregational Church and Rectory
- U.S. National Register of Historic Places
- New York City Landmark
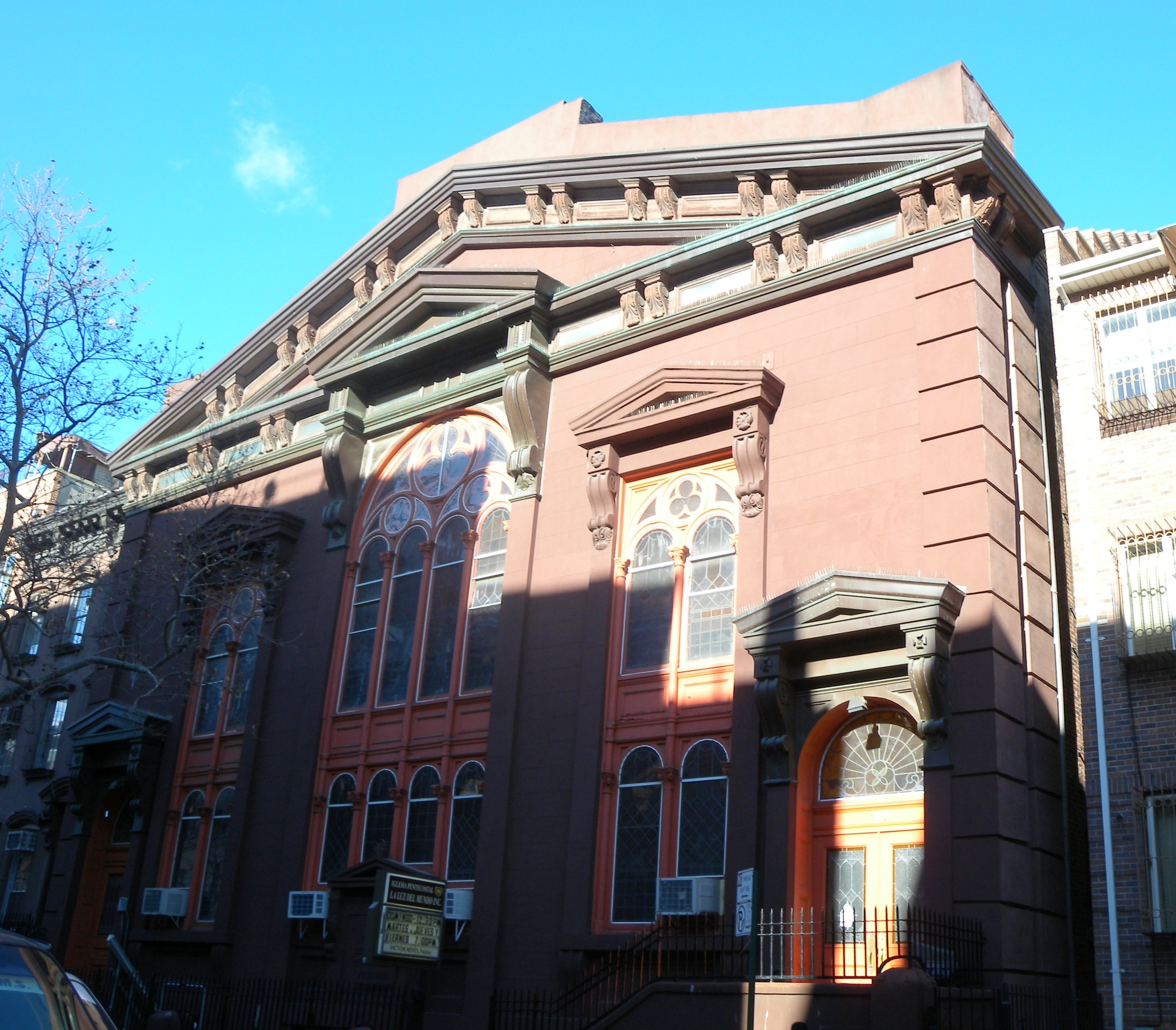

- Location within New York City Location within New York Location within the United States
- Location: 177-179 S. 9th St., Brooklyn, New York
- Coordinates: 40°42′31″N 73°57′42″W
- Area: less than one acre
- Built: 1852
- Architect: Thomas Little
- Architectural style: Italianate
- NRHP reference No.: 83001695
- NYCL No.: 2009

Significant dates
- Added to NRHP: September 15, 1983
- Designated NYCL: November 24, 1981

La Iglesia Pentecostal La Luz del Mundo / Light of the World Church Pentecostal Church is an Assemblies of God Pentecostal church in Williamsburg, Brooklyn, New York City. Since 1955, it has occupied the New England Congregational Church at 179 South 9th Street, a historic 19th-century edifice.

The former New England Congregational Church was a Congregational Church built between 1852 and 1853 in the Italianate-style to designs by Thomas Little. It is a brick building faced in brownstone with wood and metal trim. Henry Ward Beecher gave the keynote address at the cornerstone laying and his younger brother Thomas K. Beecher was the guiding spirit for the young congregation. The adjacent rectory was built in 1868.

At some point, the Congregational congregation sold the church and it was operating as a Lutheran church in the mid 20th century. The Lutherans sold the church in 1955 to Iglesia Pentecostal La Luz del Mundo / Light of the World Church Pentecostal Church (Assemblies of God Pentecostal). It was landmark protected in 1981. It was restored between 1988 and 1993, and as of 2008 was still in use. It was listed on the National Register of Historic Places in 1983.

== See also ==
- List of New York City Designated Landmarks in Brooklyn
- National Register of Historic Places listings in Brooklyn
