= Hubbard House (Brooklyn) =

Historic house in Brooklyn, New York

- U.S. National Register of Historic Places
- New York State Register of Historic Places
- New York City Landmark
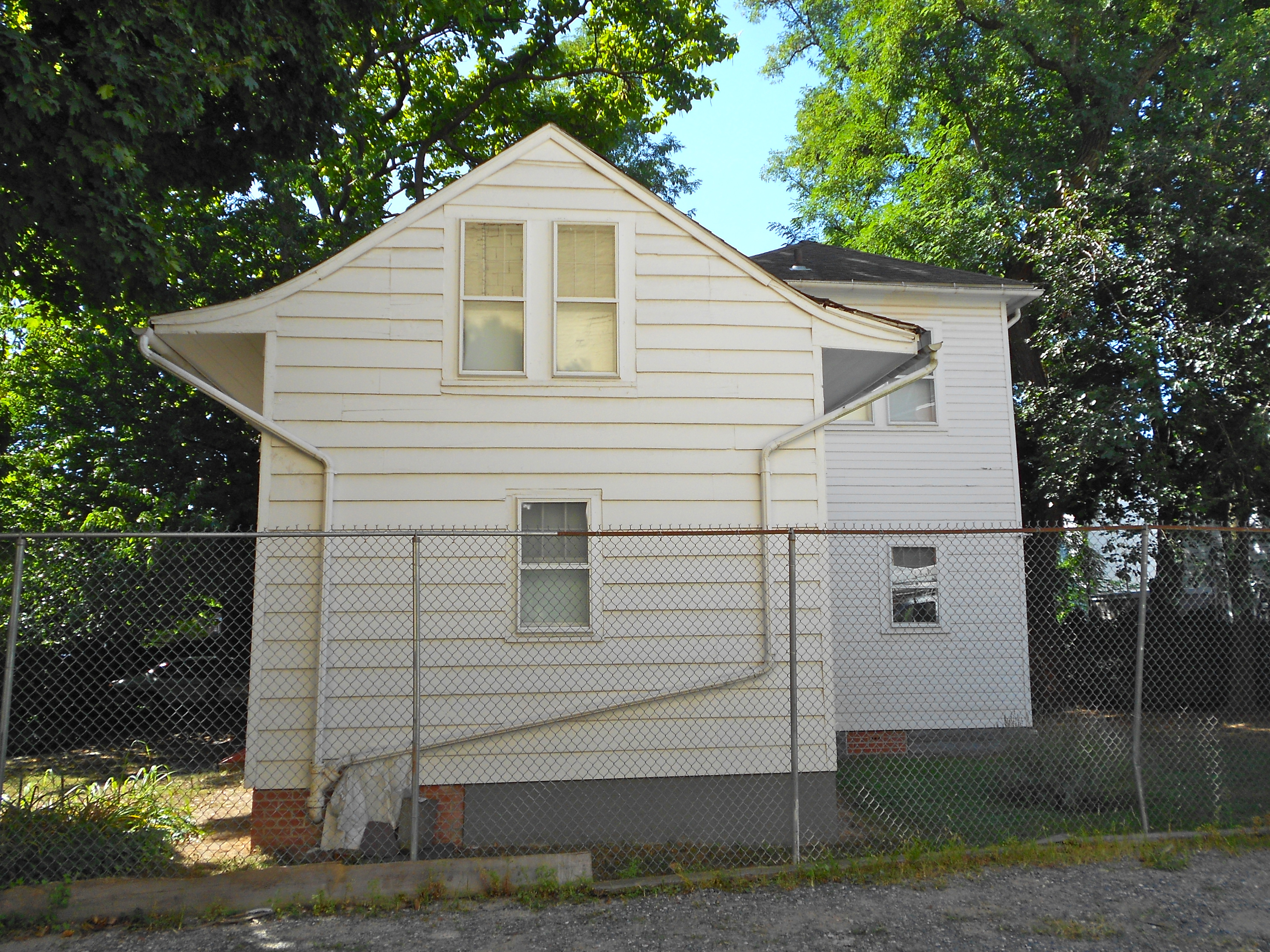
- Side view

- Location within New York City Location within New York Location within the United States
- Location: 2138 McDonald Ave., Brooklyn, New York
- Coordinates: 40°36′0″N 73°58′23″W
- Area: less than one acre
- Architectural style: Dutch Colonial
- NRHP reference No.: 00000575
- NYSRHP No.: 04701.014767
- NYCL No.: 2292

Significant dates
- Added to NRHP: June 2, 2000
- Designated NYSRHP: April 5, 2000
- Designated NYCL: January 13, 2009

Hubbard House, also known as Hubbard-Lucchelli House and Theresa Lucchelli House, is a historic home located in Brooklyn, New York. It is believed to have been built between 1825 and 1838. It was listed on the National Register of Historic Places in 2000 and later designated by the New York City Landmarks Preservation Commission on January 13, 2009.

== Description and history ==
The Hubbard House was constructed by Lawrence Ryder, a Gravesend carpenter-builder, for Nelly Hubbard, the daughter of a farmer of Dutch descent who married a descendant of one of the first English settlers in Gravesend. Beginning in 1850, it was leased to workers and artisans. In 1904, garment worker Vincenzo Lucchelli purchased the house with his wife and five children. In 1924, Salvati & Le Quornik designed a southern two-story hippedroofed wing which incorporated a “sleeping porch” for family members suffering from tuberculosis. Theresa Lucchelli (1902–1997) inherited the house and resided in it from the age of two until her death.

It is a small, white Dutch Colonial–style farmhouse which uses H-bent construction. It consists of two sections: a 1 1/2-story, one-room-deep main section with a 2-story, one-room-wide by two-room-deep wing. It is covered with pine clapboard.

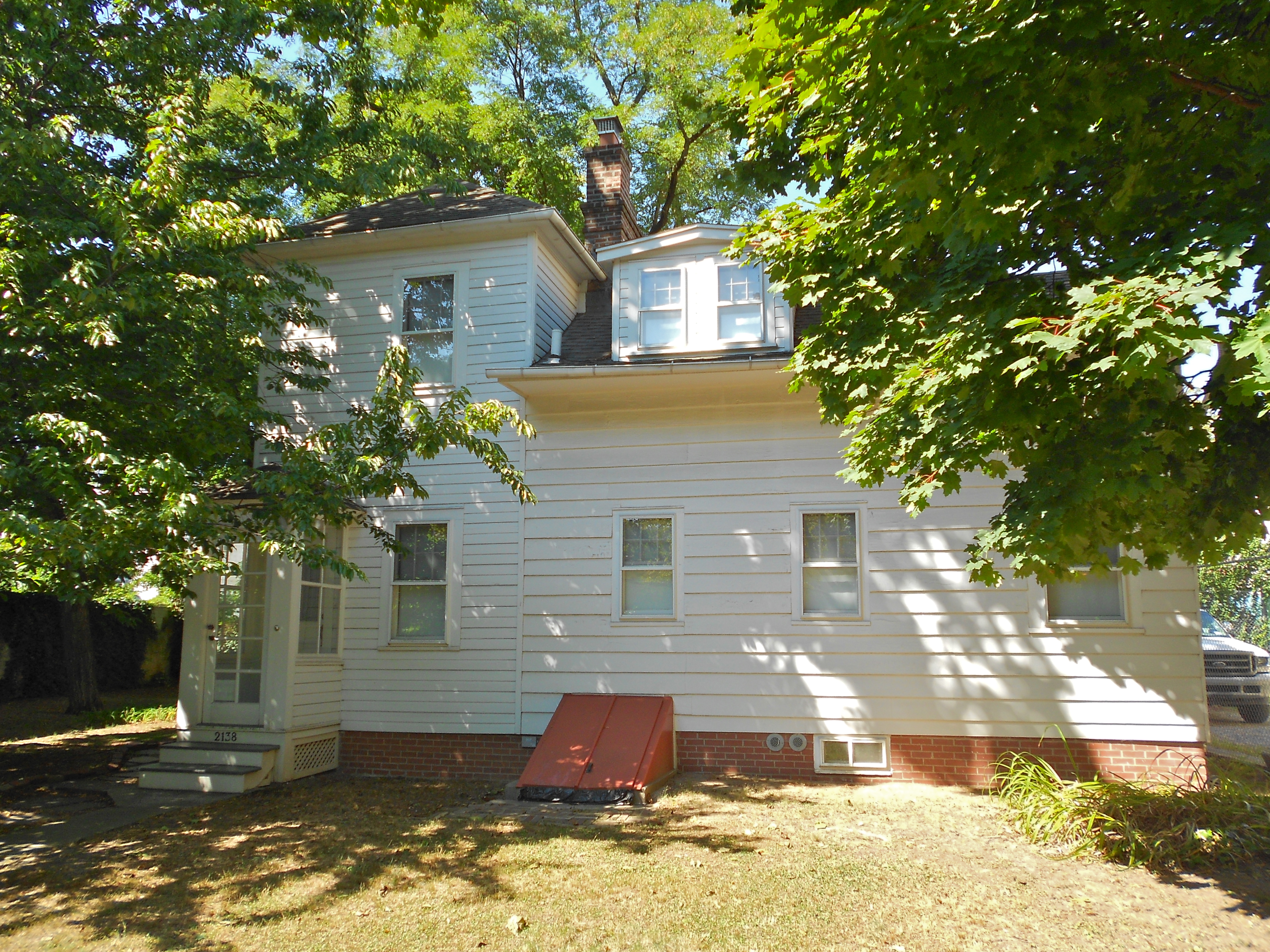
Rear view

== See also ==
- List of New York City Designated Landmarks in Brooklyn
- National Register of Historic Places listings in Brooklyn
