= Charles Henry Ludington =

American merchant

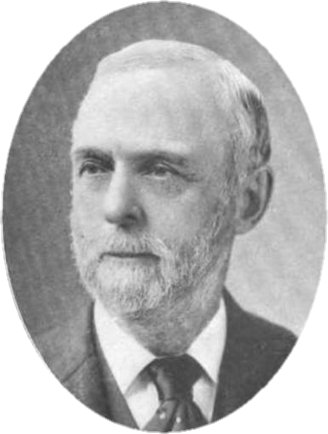
- circa 1899
- Born: February 1, 1825; Carmel, New York
- Died: January 1, 1910 (aged 84); New York City
- Occupation: Merchant
- Parent(s): Lewis Ludington, Polly Townsend

Charles Henry Ludington (February 1, 1825 – January 1, 1910) was a nineteenth-century American merchant in the dry goods business.

== Early life and education ==
Charles Henry Ludington, son of Lewis Ludington and his wife Polly (Townsend) Ludington was born in Carmel, New York on February 1, 1825. He attended the Carmel Academy school as a child and had further education at the Ridgefield, Connecticut School District.

Ludington initially worked in New York as a clerk in a wholesale dry goods firm called Woodward, Otis & Terbell, and later at Johnes, Otis & Company.

== Mid life and business career ==
Ludington in 1849 became a partner in a dry goods firm later named Lathrop, Ludington, and Company. The importing and wholesale business was first located on Cortlandt Street in Manhattan and eight years later moved to a larger store on Park Row in Park Place in Brooklyn, New York. The firm had business in all parts of the United States north of the Mason–Dixon line and had a good reputation in the field.

== Personal life ==
Ludington retired from Lathrop, Ludington, and Company in 1868. He had been on the board of directors for many corporations and public institutions. He had been a director of Washington Life Insurance Company and American Surety Company. Ludington was a member of the Union League social club and the Century Association social club. He was also an active member of three art associations.

== Legacy ==
In Old Lyme, Connecticut, the Phoebe Griffin Noyes Library was built in 1898 as a memorial to Ludington's mother-in-law.

== Sources ==
- Beers, J. H. (1905). Genealogical and Biographical Record of New London County, Connecticut. Madison, Wisconsin: J. H. Beers & Company. OCLC 212371094.
- King, Moses (1899). Notable New Yorkers of 1896-1899. New York City: M. King. OCLC 2400420.
- Weeks, Lyman Horace (1898). Prominent Families of New York. New York City: Historical Company. OCLC 919823829.
