= Prospect Park Boathouse =

- Boathouse on the Lullwater of the Lake in Prospect Park
- U.S. National Register of Historic Places
- New York State Register of Historic Places
- New York City Landmark
- Western side
- Location: Brooklyn, New York
- Coordinates: 40°39′39″N 73°57′55″W
- Built: 1905–1907
- Architect: Helmle & Huberty
- NRHP reference No.: 72000850
- NYSRHP No.: 04701.004573
- NYCL No.: 0004

Significant dates
- Added to NRHP: January 7, 1972
- Designated NYSRHP: June 23, 1980
- Designated NYCL: October 14, 1965

The Prospect Park Boathouse is in the eastern part of Prospect Park in Brooklyn, New York City. It is situated on the northeast shore of the Lullwater, a waterway north of Prospect Park's Lake and southeast of the Ravine.

== Description ==
Map of notable buildings and structures at Prospect Park (note: not all entrances shown). Click on points for more details.

Helmle, Hudswell and Huberty, protégés of McKim, Mead and White, designed the boathouse. It supplanted an older wooden boathouse further north. The classical design contains an arcade facing the Lullwater, with a canopy supported by columns of the Tuscan order. The entablature at the top of the columns contains triglyphs, and a balustrade runs atop the canopy, surrounding it and forming a second-floor terrace. The interior of the Boathouse had double staircases that ascended to a second floor, merging at a landing in the middle. There was a boat-renting office at ground level, between the staircases. The second floor was composed of a dining room with doors opening outward onto the terrace. The terrace received a shed in 1915.

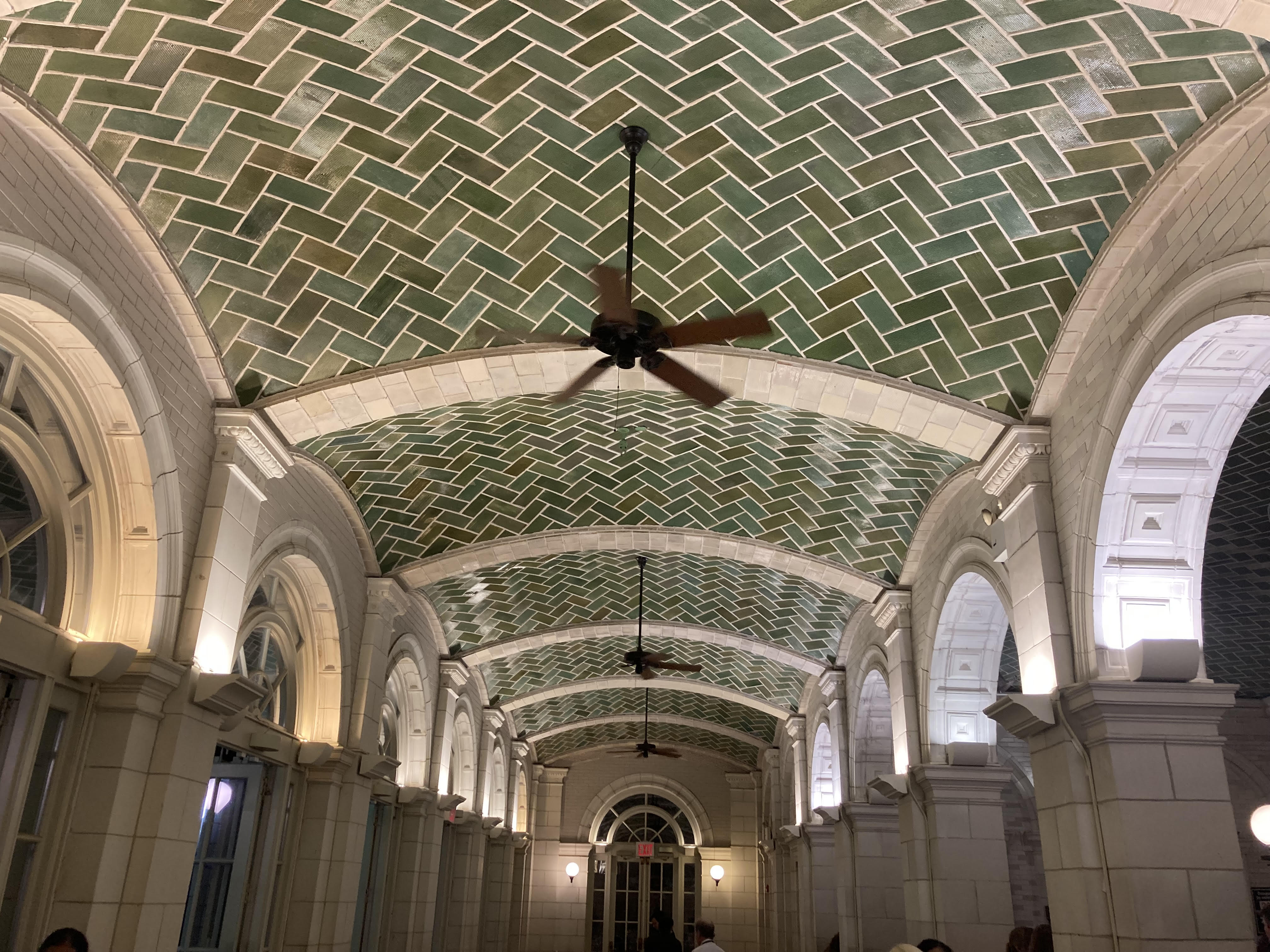
Ceiling of the Prospect Park Boathouse.

== History ==
The Boathouse on the Lullwater was built in 1905–07. By the 1960s, the structure was underutilized. The boat concession only operated on weekends and the Boathouse was visited by fewer than ten people an hour, even on the busiest summer weekends. At one point in September 1964, the Parks Department was within forty-eight hours of demolishing the Boathouse. The resulting historic preservation movement generated public pressure to save the Boathouse, which was listed on the National Register of Historic Places in 1972.

Restorations were deferred for several years. The interior renovations began in 1971, under Commissioner August Heckscher. The Boathouse reopened to the public in 1974, but the exterior terracotta was not renovated until 1979. Further restorations were required in the 1980s under Commissioner Gordon Davis to repair damage from a leaking roof. After twenty years as a visitors center and park ranger headquarters, the Boathouse was restored for a third time in the late 1990s because of deterioration in the terracotta. It now houses the Audubon Center, the Audubon Society's only urban interpretive center in the United States.

In May 2024, Oberon Group agreed to operate a cafe at the boathouse, which opened that July.

== Educational programs ==
Each September since 2019, the Brooklyn Public Library sponsors an Open Air University with free non-accredited courses on the Boathouse grounds, hosting immigrant professors, academics, and teachers who were trained outside of the U.S.

== See also ==
- List of New York City Designated Landmarks in Brooklyn
- National Register of Historic Places listings in Brooklyn
