= Lefferts Historic House =

Museum in Brooklyn, New York

Lefferts Historic House Museum
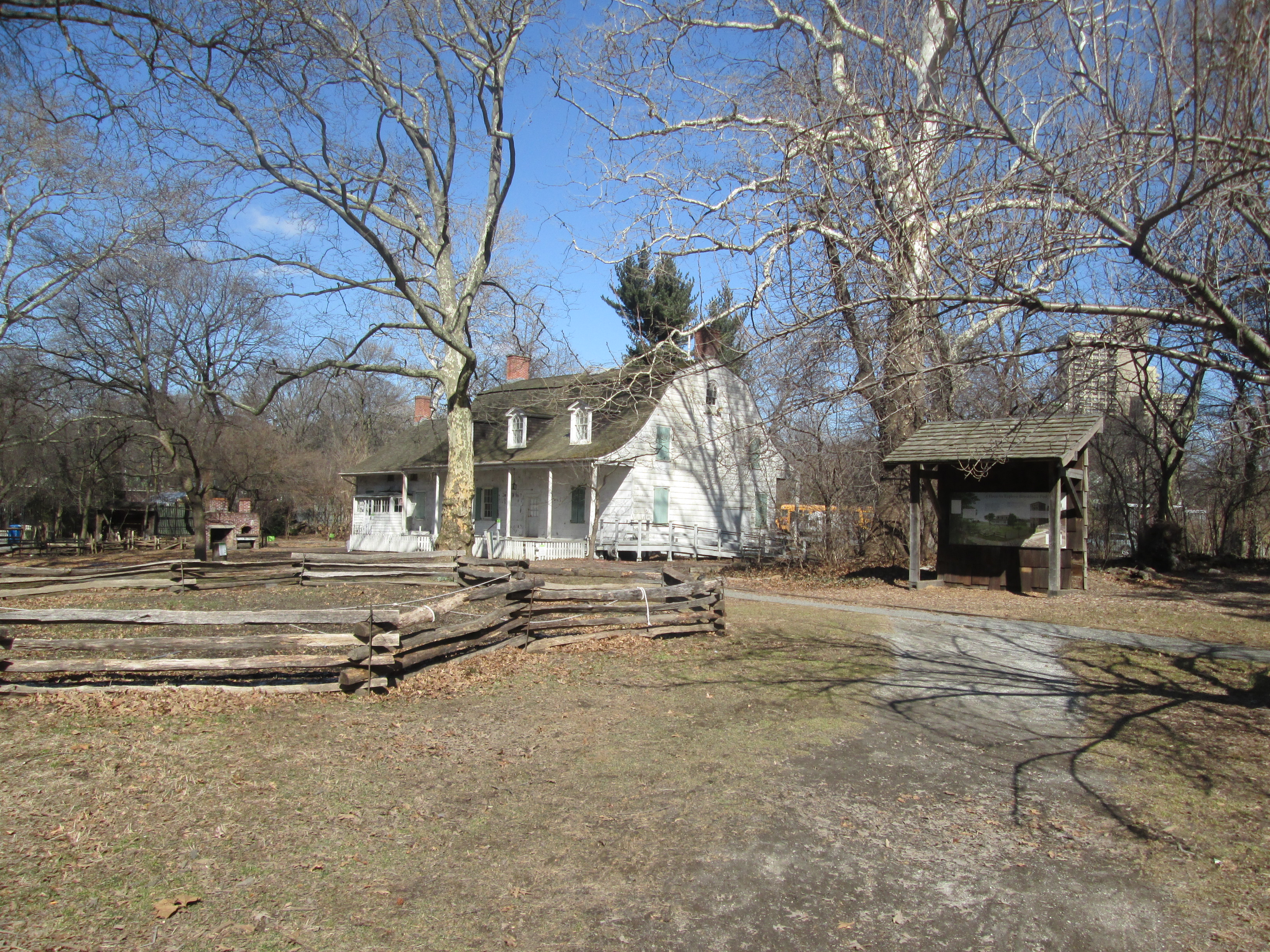
- Established: 1783; 243 years ago
- Location: Prospect Park, Brooklyn, New York, United States
- Coordinates: 40.664323°N 73.963802°W
- Website: www.prospectpark.org/visit-the-park/places-to-go/lefferts-historic-house/

The Lefferts Historic House is located within Prospect Park in Brooklyn, New York City. Built circa 1783, it is the former home of enslaved persons and the family of Continental Army Lieutenant Pieter Lefferts. It currently operates as a museum of the Leffertses' family life in Kings County. The museum is part of the Historic House Trust, owned by the New York City Department of Parks and Recreation and operated by the Prospect Park Alliance. It is a New York City designated landmark.

== History ==
=== Use as residence ===
Map of notable buildings and structures at Prospect Park (note: not all entrances shown). Click on points for more details.

Pieter Lefferts, who served in the Flatbush militia and as a delegate to the New York Constitutional Convention, built the house on the 240-acre Lefferts family estate located on Flatbush Avenue near today's Maple Street. It was moved to its current site in 1918. The structure's Dutch architectural elements paid tribute to the Dutch heritage of the Lefferts family and of Kings County, but as Professor Daniel Bluestone has explained, its "central hallway framed by arches" were distinctly late-eighteenth-century American.

The 1800 census recorded twelve enslaved residents and eight members of the Lefferts family in the household—a testament to the fact that the Lefferts were one of the largest slaveholding families in the county. It was common for enslaved persons to live in the same dwelling with the enslaving families.

After the Revolutionary War "slavery actually strengthened in Kings County", due to its profitability in what was then the breadbasket to nearby New York City. The Center for Brooklyn History refers to Kings County in the post-revolutionary era as a "slaveholding capital". Even as the rest of the state moved toward emancipation in the post-revolutionary period, the Leffertses engaged actively in the "trade, sale, and purchase of enslaved people up until emancipation was enacted in New York in 1827" by the state legislature. Many African-Americans in Brooklyn, by contrast, actively resisted slavery and worked toward emancipation during this period. The stubborn persistence of slavery and slaveholders like the Lefferts in Kings County well into the 1820s was, according to Wellman, the "geographic and social context" for the future community of Weeksville, one of the United States' largest communities of free Black people prior to the American Civil War. The Lefferts family freed the people they enslaved. After 1827, the loss of unpaid labor forced the Lefferts family to change the way they could profit from their land and the types of crops they grew. The Lefferts moved to a system of tenant farming to cultivate the land and sold some portions of the estate. In 1838, James Weeks purchased a part of the Lefferts estate to create Weeksville, which, Wellman writes, "represented a refusal to live ... 'in the shadow of slavery.'" Upon Pieter's death, the house had passed to his son John, who built a large rear addition to the house in the 1850s, and then John's daughter Gertrude Lefferts Vanderbilt, who wrote about her family, her community and the house in her 1881 book, The Social History of Flatbush. The house remained in the Lefferts family for at least four generations.

=== Use as museum ===
Development was threatening Brooklyn's rural setting by the end of the 19th Century and in 1917, John Lefferts' estate offered the family's home to the City of New York with the condition that the house be moved onto city property as a means of protection and historic preservation. The house was moved six blocks to Prospect Park. Preservationists made a decision to remove the 1850s rear wing of the building to emphasize its post-revolutionary-era appearance. This decision, according to Bluestone, "introduced a strain of discontinuity between the Lefferts homestead and its place in Flatbush history". In 1918 and in 1920, the Fort Greene chapter of the Daughters of the American Revolution opened the house as a museum and installed a "revolutionary" cannon from Governor's Island in the front yard.

Local department store Abraham & Straus announced in January 1965 that it would establish a children's farm next to the Lefferts Historic House to celebrate the park's centennial. Abraham & Straus provided up to $100,000 for the project, which was part of a larger $450,000 project to renovate Prospect Park. In response to the announcement, city councilman Paul O'Dwyer sued to prevent the farm's construction, and local residents filed a separate suit claiming that the farm was intended as an advertisement for A&S. The New York City Department of Parks and Recreation approved the children's farm in November 1966. A state judge halted the project the next year, stating that a member of the Municipal Art Commission who had approved the project was also an ex-employee of A&S, but the injunction preventing the farm's construction was lifted in early 1968. The dedication of the children's farm was delayed until August 1971 due to numerous lawsuits.

Lefferts Historic House operates a children's museum highlighting of the Leffertses' family life in Kings County over three centuries including the Dutch and Native Americans who lived in the area before the structure was built. A 2019 report stated that "The house now works as a museum, featuring a working garden, historic artifacts, period rooms, exhibits and activities such as candle making and butter churning". As of March 2021, the museum was closed because the house's roof, exterior, drainage system, and paths were being restored by Prospect Park Alliance. The $2.5 million renovation of the house officially began in June 2021 and was completed in May 2023. Afterward, the Lefferts Historic House Museum began hosting exhibits of the area's native inhabitants and the slaves that formerly worked at the house.

== Additional tours ==
Before the house was closed for a restoration in 2019, there were tours of the upstairs rooms. On Father's Day and on Open House New York weekends, there are additional behind the scenes tours of the attic and basement areas.

== See also ==
- Lefferts-Laidlaw House
