= James F. Capalino =

James Francis Capalino (born July 14, 1950) is an American executive and government relations consultant.

He is known for his service as Commissioner of the Department of General Services (now part of New York City Department of Citywide Administrative Services) in Mayor Ed Koch’s first administration and for founding Capalino+Company, the second largest government and community relations lobbying firm in New York City.

== Early life and education ==
Capalino was born in Hastings, Nebraska, where his father was a businessman who later moved the family to Williamsville, New York. He began his career at the age of 16, helping run a $1.3 million youth employment agency, in neighboring Buffalo, that put 5,000 young people to work cleaning parks and buildings in that city. Capalino went on to become a summer intern to Representative Bella Abzug while attending Colgate University, located in Hamilton, New York.

Capalino graduated cum laude from Colgate University in 1972 with a B.A. in political science and has an M.A. in management and urban affairs from The New School.

== Career ==
=== Public sector ===
In 1973, with his interest in politics growing, he joined the office of then-Congressman Ed Koch eventually rising to the Congressman's Executive Assistant.

In 1977, he successfully managed Koch's campaign for Mayor, defeating Mario Cuomo in the Democratic run-off and again in the general election against Republican Roy Goodman.

Capalino was appointed Director of Transition, where he handled the changeover from Mayor Abraham Beame’s administration to the incoming Koch administration. Capalino went on to run the Mayor’s Community Board Assistance Unit; however, following a scandal at General Services, he was tasked by the Mayor with reviewing the operations of that department.

Upon completion of his scathing report about the department’s operations, Koch promoted him to become the head of the agency. Appointed in February 1979 at the age of 28, Capalino became the youngest Commissioner in New York City history, a milestone that has yet to be broken.

At the time of his departure from the administration, The New York Times wrote, “he is known for his strong management skills, and his department is regularly named when people in municipal government are asked to cite an agency that works well.” He left the post at the end of 1981 going into the private sector.

In 1985 Capalino returned to Koch's camp, managing his successful second reelection campaign winning 75% of the vote, the largest margin in the City's history.

=== Private sector ===
From 1982-1984, Capalino was President and CEO of the Lincoln West Associates, sponsors of one of the country's largest mixed-use development projects on the 76.5 acre former Penn Yards in Manhattan, a project that created much controversy at the time.

From 1984-87, he served as Senior Vice President and Co-Managing Director of the Edward S. Gordon Company's Financial District office, where he initiated more than one million square feet of commercial office leases and assisted developers in launching two major Brooklyn office developments, 1 Pierrepont Plaza and MetroTech Center.

Following his return to managing the Koch reelection campaign, he held several different positions. Capalino founded and served as President of Capalino, LoCicero, Marino & Tan, Inc., a government, public relations and real estate advisory firm working as a lobbyist with a fellow Koch alumni.

From 1993 to 1997 he served as Chief Operating Officer of AJ Contracting, one of the oldest general contracting firms in the city. Under his leadership the firm grew from $125 million to $400 million in revenues ranking it 86th out of the nation's top 400 contractors.

He stayed active in politics, organizing for Senator Gary Hart’s presidential campaign in 1988.

=== Capalino+Company ===
In 2000, he founded government and community relations lobbying firm, Capalino+Company. The firm serves a mix of real estate firms, private corporations and non-profits. Clients include the New York Academy of Medicine (NYAM), Rudin Management Group/St. Vincent's Hospital, the High Line and Time Warner Cable to name a few. The firm also helped guide The Related Companies through the process of acquiring the West Side Yard.

Capalino was a key player in bringing the High Line Park to fruition offering strategic advice, as well as serving as a founding board member until 2011.

== Personal life ==
Capalino has been married since 1976 to Carlin B. Vickery, a plastic surgeon in private practice and an Associate Clinical Professor in the Department of Surgery at Mount Sinai Medical Center in New York City. Together they have three children: Borden, Reid and Julia.

He has served on the board of directors of GMHC, and was a founding board member of Friends of the High Line. He currently sits on the boards of Safe Space, and Friends of the Hudson River Park.
