= Lefferts-Laidlaw House =

Historic house in Brooklyn, New York

- U.S. National Register of Historic Places
- New York City Landmark
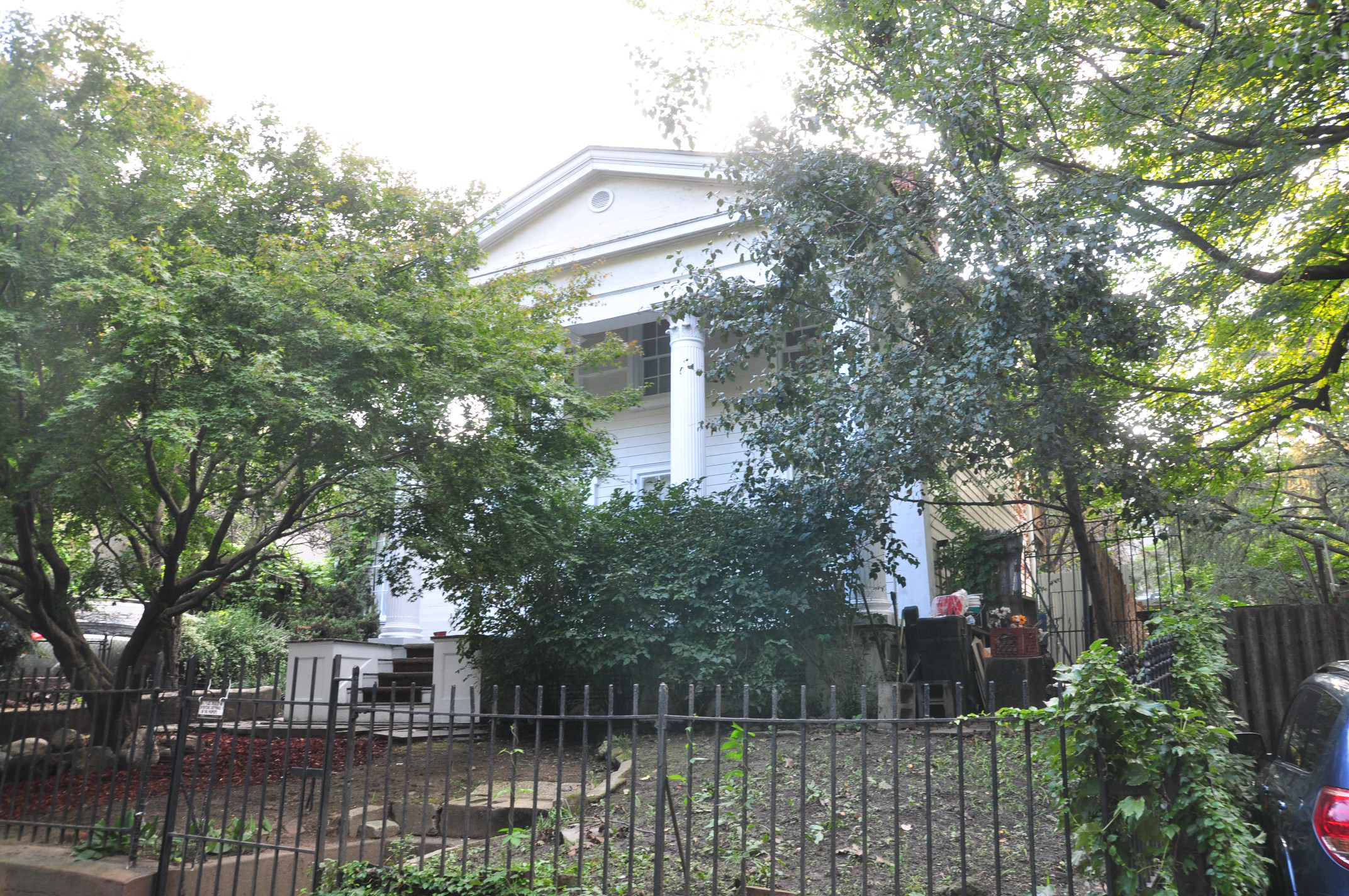
- September 2012
- Location: 136 Clinton Ave., Brooklyn, New York
- Coordinates: 40°41′38″N 73°58′09″W
- Area: less than one acre
- Built: 1840
- Architect: Lefferts, Rem; Laidlaw, John
- Architectural style: Greek Revival
- NRHP reference No.: 85002279
- NYCL No.: 2099

Significant dates
- Added to NRHP: September 12, 1985
- Designated NYCL: November 13, 2001

The Lefferts-Laidlaw House is a historic villa located in the Wallabout neighborhood of Brooklyn in New York City, United States. Built around 1840, the house is a two-story frame building in the temple-fronted Greek Revival style.

== History ==
The house site was originally part of a 100 feet wide by 246 feet deep tract of land purchased in 1834 by Henry Ryer, a Manhattan merchant, from George Washington Pine. Ryer divided the property, located on the west side of Clinton Avenue (named in honor of New York Governor DeWitt Clinton.) into four 25 feet wide lots.

After a few sales and repurchases, the land was bought by Rem Lefferts, a Brooklyn merchant, and his brother-in-law John Laidlaw. The main portion of the house was built about 1840. A two-room wing that was only one story was likely built between 1836 and 1840 between the main portion of the house and the rear kitchen. The first residents were Leffert Lefferts Jr. (1791-1868), Rem's older brother, and Amelia Ann Cozine Lefferts (1782-1878), daughter of Margaret Roosevelt (granddaughter of Johannes Roosevelt) and John Cozine (d. 1796), a New York attorney and judge of the New York State Supreme Court.

In November 1843, Lefferts sold the property to his sister, Sarah Lefferts Millard (1805-1849), and brother-in-law, A. Orville Millard (b. 1809). Millard was a native of Ulster County and moved to New York City in 1830 to study law, opening an office on Nassau Street in Manhattan. In 1849, Sarah Millard died following the birth of her sixth child. Millard owned the home until it was purchased by real estate investor Robert Bage in April 1854.

In September 2016, the house was listed for sale for $4,500,000. The house was unlisted and partially renovated before being privately sold in 2018 to a New York-based fashion designer.

== Architecture ==
The house is a two-story frame building in the temple-fronted Greek Revival style. It consists of a two-story central section with a one-story south elevation and two-story rear extension. The front facade features a gabled portico supported by four Corinthian fluted columns with an Ionic entablature and pediment.

Similar to many Greek Revival mansions of the period, the House originally had an elaborate entrance surround featuring an architrave, palmettes, and rosettes. The design was most likely inspired by Minard Lafever's Modern Builders' Guide (published in 1833) and The Beauties of Modem Architecture (published in 1835). Vintage photographs reveal that the house built by Henry Ryer house next door (since demolished) had a nearly identical entrance and used the same column capitals, which leads historians to suggest that both houses were erected by the same builder or designed by the same architect.

During the 1940s or the 1950s, the period columns were removed and were replaced with square pillars. The building was refaced with asphalt shingles and a synthetic faux-brick siding and the southern end of the lot was transformed into a driveway shared with another home on Clinton Avenue. In the 1970s and 1980s, the home was bought and restored by Allen Handelman and Richard Arnow.

It was listed on the National Register of Historic Places in 1985.

== See also ==
- Lefferts Historic House
- List of New York City Landmarks
- National Register of Historic Places listings in Kings County, New York
