= AIA Guide to New York City =

Book guide to New York City

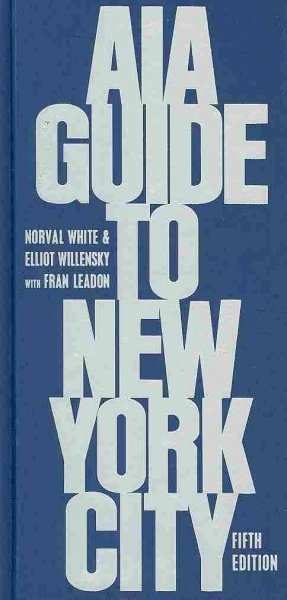
- Hardcover edition
- Author: Norval White; Elliot Willensky; Fran Leadon
- Language: English
- Subject: Architecture of New York City
- Genre: Catalogue
- Publisher: Oxford University Press
- Publication date: June 9, 2010
- Publication place: United States
- Media type: Print
- Pages: 1088
- ISBN: 978-0195383850

The AIA Guide to New York City by Norval White, Elliot Willensky, and Fran Leadon is an extensive catalogue with descriptions, critique and photographs of significant and noteworthy architecture throughout the five boroughs of New York City. Originally published in 1967 and written by Norval White and Elliot Willensky, the fifth edition, with new co-author Fran Leadon (and minus Willensky, who died in 1990), was published in 2010.

The book covers the architecture of nearly 6000 buildings in New York City.

== See also ==
- American Institute of Architects
- Architecture of New York City
