= Norval White =

American architect

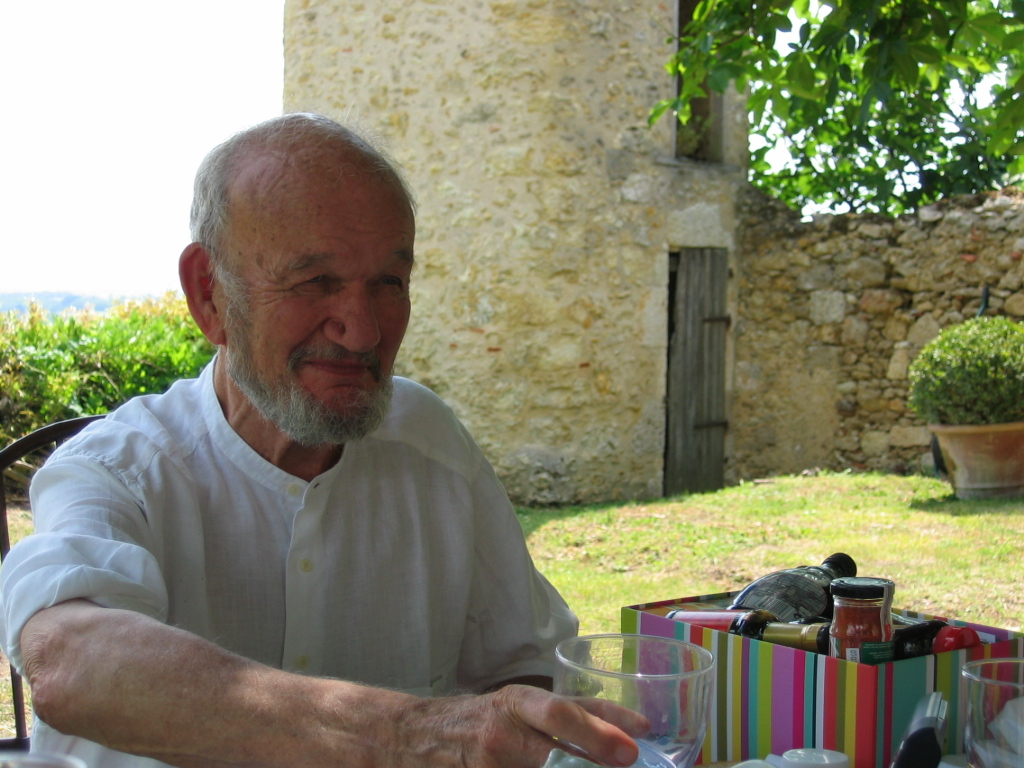
Norval White on June 12, 2006

Norval Crawford White (June 12, 1926 – December 26, 2009) was an American architect, architectural historian and professor. He designed buildings throughout the U.S., but he is best known for his writing, particularly the AIA Guide to New York City (with Elliot Willensky). White was widely considered to be one of the great figures of New York architecture.

== Biography ==
White was born in 1926 to surgeon William Crawford White and social worker Caroline (Taylor) White. He grew up on the Upper East Side and went to the Allen-Stevenson School and Exeter. In 1958, he married Joyce L. Lee, and they had four sons: William, Thomas, Gordon and Alastair.

Following two years on active duty with the United States Naval Reserve during World War II, White received a B.S. from the Massachusetts Institute of Technology in 1949. He attended École des Beaux-Arts (1954) and earned a Master of Fine Arts from Princeton University School of Architecture in 1955.

White resided in the neighborhood of Brooklyn Heights before moving to northwestern Connecticut in the early 1990s. He then retired and lived in the commune of Roques in the French department of le Gers with his second wife, Camilla Crowe White, until his death on December 26, 2009.

== Career ==
In 1962, upon hearing of the imminent demolition of New York City's historic Pennsylvania Station, White and several other architects, including Willensky, founded AGBANY (Action Group for Better Architecture in New York). They picketed the station and handed out fliers in protest.

In 1967, White and Willensky proposed a guide to New York City architecture to the American Institute of Architects (AIA). The AIA Guide to New York City, a 464+ page guidebook featuring over 2,600 buildings in its first edition The fourth edition of this guide was issued in 1999, then without further contributions from Willensky, who had died in 1990.

From 1968 to 1973, White worked as a partner-in-charge with Gruzen and Partners, on the development of the New York City Police Headquarters building.

White was able to finalize the 5th edition of the AIA Guide before his death, which was published in 2010.

As a professor, White taught architectural history and design, first at Cooper Union and then from 1968 at the School of Architecture and Environmental Studies at the City College of New York, where he served as the founding chairman and where he continued to teach until he retired.

== Published works ==
- AIA Guide to New York City with Elliot Willensky.
- The Architecture Book
- New York: A Physical History
- The Guide to the Architecture of Paris (in English)
