= Roques, Gers =

Roques
- Commune
- The church and surroundings in Roques
- Location of Roques
- Location within France Location within Occitanie
- Coordinates: 43°50′55″N 0°17′49″E
- Country: France
- Region: Occitania
- Department: Gers
- Arrondissement: Auch
- Canton: Fezensac
- Intercommunality: Artagnan en Fézensac

Government
  - Mayor (2020–2026): Pierrette Ménal
- Area^{1}: 8.48 km^{2} (3.27 sq mi)
- Elevation: 210 m (690 ft)
- Highest elevation: 195 m (640 ft)
- Lowest elevation: 91 m (299 ft)
- Population (2023): 103
  - Density: 12.1/km^{2} (31.5/sq mi)
- Time zone: UTC+01:00 (CET)
  - Summer (DST): UTC+02:00 (CEST)
- INSEE/Postal code: 32351 /32310
- ^{1} French Land Register data, which excludes lakes, ponds, glaciers > 1 km^{2} (0.386 sq mi or 247 acres) and river estuaries.

Roques (French pronunciation: [ʁɔk]; Occitan: Ròcas) also referred to as Roques-du-Gers is a commune in Gers, a department in southwestern France.

== Geography ==
It sits on a high ridge above the surrounding countryside about 11 km (6.8 mi) south of Condom.

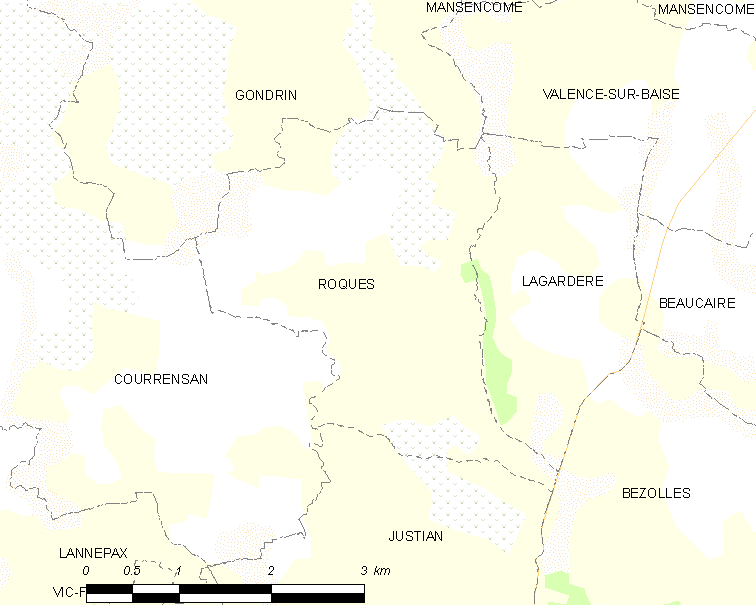
Roques and its surrounding communes

== Population ==
Historical population
Year	Pop.	±% p.a.
1968	143	—
1975	125	−1.90%
1982	135	+1.11%
1990	130	−0.47%
1999	120	−0.89%
2007	120	+0.00%
2012	99	−3.77%
2017	104	+0.99%
2023	103	−0.16%
Source: INSEE

== Notable people ==
It was home to American architectural scholar Norval White.

== See also ==
- Communes of the Gers department
