= Architecture of New York City =

The Midtown Manhattan skyline at night from the Empire State Building in 2023. Shown are clear examples of Art Deco and Modern architecture.

The building form most closely associated with New York City is the skyscraper, which has shifted many commercial and residential districts from low-rise to high-rise. Surrounded mostly by water, the city has amassed one of the largest and most varied collection of skyscrapers in the world.

New York has architecturally significant buildings in a wide range of styles spanning distinct historical and cultural periods. These include the Woolworth Building (1913), an early Gothic revival skyscraper with large-scale gothic architectural detail. The 1916 Zoning Resolution required setback in new buildings, and restricted towers to a percentage of the lot size, to allow sunlight to reach the streets below. The Art Deco design of the Chrysler Building (1930) and Empire State Building (1931), with their tapered tops and steel spires, reflected the zoning requirements. The Chrysler Building is considered by many historians and architects to be one of New York's finest, with its distinctive ornamentation such as V-shaped lighting inserts capped by a steel spire at the tower's crown. Early influential examples of the International Style in the United States are 330 West 42nd Street (1931) and the Seagram Building (1958). The Condé Nast Building (2000) is an important example of green design in American skyscrapers.

The character of New York's large residential districts is often defined by the elegant brownstone rowhouses, townhouses, and tenements that were built during a period of rapid expansion from 1870 to 1930. In contrast, New York City also has neighborhoods that are less densely populated and feature free-standing dwellings. In the outer boroughs, large single-family homes are common in various architectural styles such as Tudor Revival and Victorian. Split two-family homes are also widely available across the outer boroughs, for example in the Flushing area.

Stone and brick became the city's building materials of choice after the construction of wood-frame houses was limited in the aftermath of the Great Fire of 1835. Unlike Paris, which for centuries was built from its own limestone bedrock, New York has always drawn its building stone from a far-flung network of quarries and its stone buildings have a variety of textures and hues. A distinctive feature of many of the city's buildings is the presence of wooden roof-mounted water towers. In the 19th century, the city required their installation on buildings higher than six stories to prevent the need for excessively high water pressures at lower elevations, which could burst municipal water pipes. Garden apartments became popular during the 1920s in outlying areas, including Jackson Heights in Queens, which became more accessible with expansion of the subway.

== Concentrations of buildings ==
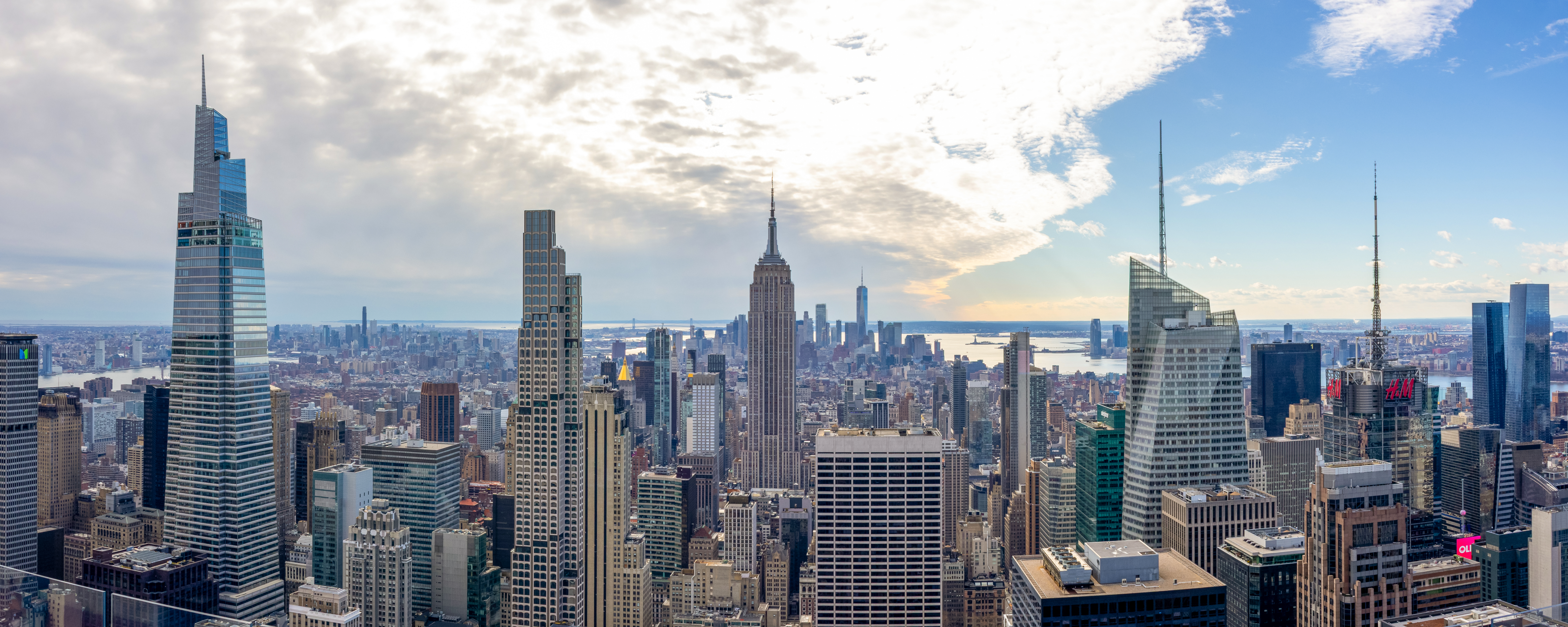
A section of Midtown Manhattan in daytime.

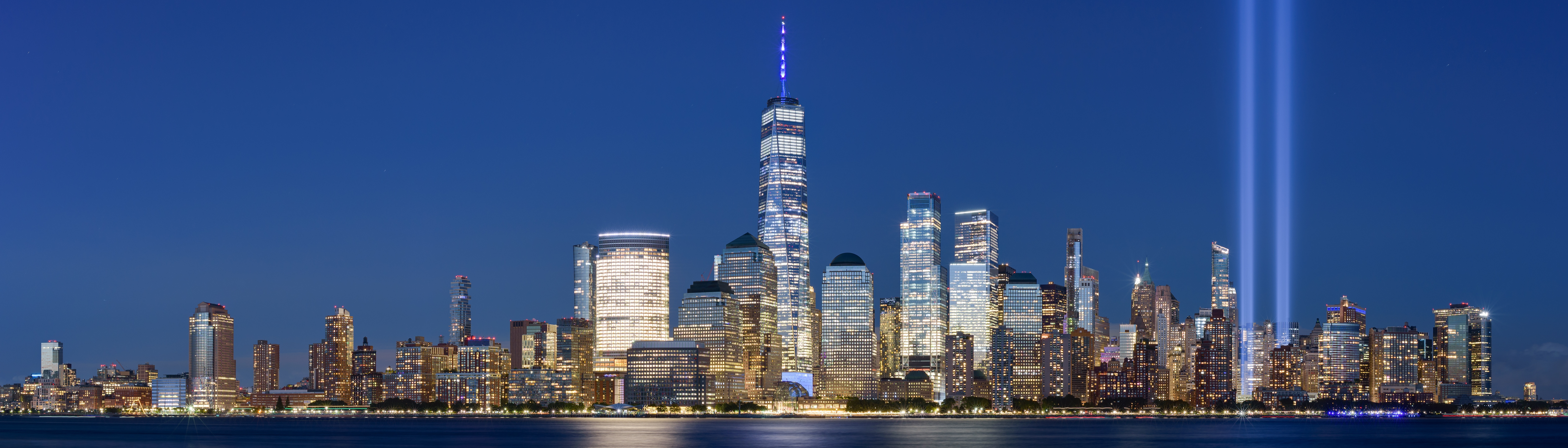
A section of Lower Manhattan at night.

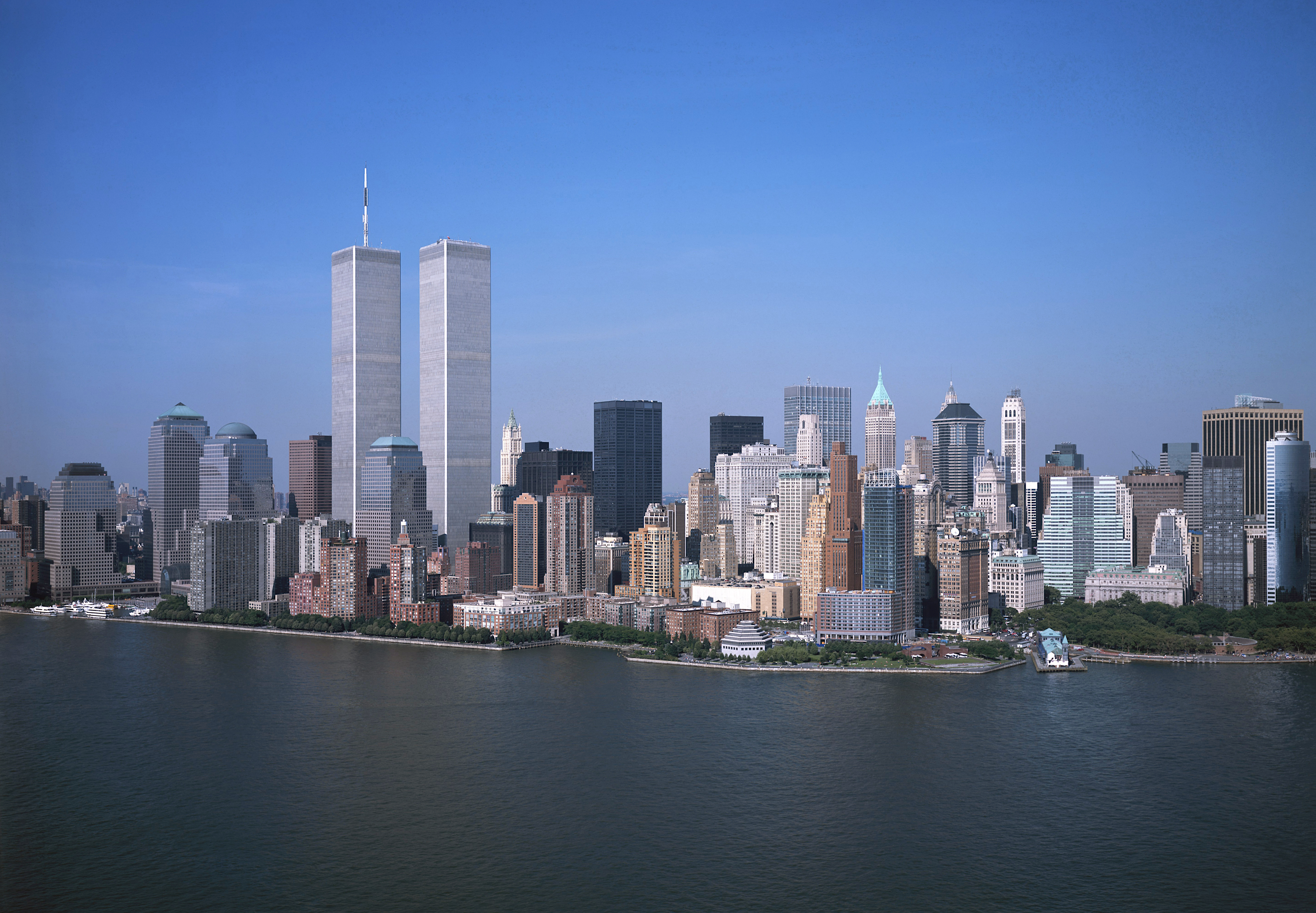
The Lower Manhattan skyline shortly before the September 11 attacks in 2001

New York has two main concentrations of high-rise buildings: Midtown Manhattan and Lower Manhattan, each with its own uniquely recognizable skyline. Midtown Manhattan, the largest central business district in the world, is home to such notable buildings as the Empire State Building, the Chrysler Building, and Citigroup Center, as well as the Rockefeller Center complex. Lower Manhattan comprises the third largest central business district in the United States (after Midtown and the Chicago Loop). Lower Manhattan was characterized by the omnipresence of the Twin Towers of the World Trade Center from its completion in 1973 until its destruction in the September 11 attacks in 2001.

In the first decade of the 21st century, Lower Manhattan saw reconstruction, which included One World Trade Center within the new World Trade Center complex. The Downtown skyline received new designs from such architects as Santiago Calatrava and Frank Gehry. In 2010, a 749-foot (228 m), 43-story tower named 200 West Street was built for Goldman Sachs across the street from the World Trade Center site.

New York City has a long history of tall buildings. It has been home to 10 buildings that have held the world's tallest fully habitable building title at some point in history, although half have since been demolished. The first building to bring the world's tallest title to New York was the New York World Building, in 1890. Later, New York City was home to the world's tallest building for 75 continuous years, starting with the Park Row Building in 1899 and ending with One World Trade Center upon completion of the Sears Tower in 1974. The 1899 Park Row Building, one of the world's earliest skyscrapers, is still standing.

Graph of the 1916 New York City zoning ordinance with an example elevation for an 80-foot street in a 2½-times height district

The high-rise buildings of Brooklyn constitute a third, much smaller skyline. Downtown Brooklyn is also experiencing an extensive building boom, with new high rise luxury residential towers, commercial space and a new arena in the planning stages. The building boom in Brooklyn has had a great deal of opposition from local civic and environmental groups which contend that Brooklyn needs to maintain its human scale. The borough of Queens has also been developing its own skyline in recent years with One Court Square (the tallest building in the city outside Manhattan), and the Queens West development of several residential towers along the East River waterfront.

The 1916 Zoning Resolution required setback in new buildings, and restricted towers to a percentage of the lot size, to allow sunlight to reach the streets below.

== History ==
The skyscraper, which has shaped Manhattan's distinctive skyline, has been closely associated with New York City's identity since the end of the 19th century. From 1890 to 1973, the title of world's tallest building resided continually in Manhattan (except for a gap between 1894 and 1908, when the title was held by Philadelphia City Hall), with eight different buildings holding the title. The New York World Building on Park Row, was the first to take the title in 1890, standing 309 feet (94 m) until 1955, when it was demolished to construct a new ramp to the Brooklyn Bridge. The nearby Park Row Building, with its 29 stories standing 391 feet (119 m) high, became the world's tallest office building when it opened in 1899.

=== Early 20th century ===
The 41-story Singer Building, constructed in 1908 as the headquarters of the eponymous sewing machine manufacturer, stood 612 feet (187 m) high until 1967, when it became the tallest building ever demolished. The Metropolitan Life Insurance Company Tower, standing 700 feet (210 m) at the foot of Madison Avenue, wrested the title of world's tallest building in 1909, with a tower reminiscent of St Mark's Campanile in Venice. The Woolworth Building, and its distinctive Gothic architecture, took the title in 1913, topping off at 792 feet (241 m). Structures such as the Equitable Building of 1915, which rises vertically forty stories from the sidewalk, prompted the passage of the 1916 Zoning Resolution, requiring new buildings to contain setbacks withdrawing progressively at a defined angle from the street as they rose, in order to preserve a view of the sky at street level.

Grand Central Terminal is located in East Midtown close to the Chrysler Building. The railroad terminal, completed in 1913, is the third on its site. It was built in the Beaux-Arts style by the firms Reed and Stem and Warren and Wetmore. It became a National Historic Landmark in 1976.

The Roaring Twenties saw a race to the sky, with three separate buildings pursuing the world's tallest title in the span of a year. As the stock market soared in the days before the Wall Street Crash of 1929, two developers publicly competed for the crown. At 927 feet (283 m), 40 Wall Street, completed in May 1930 in only eleven months as the headquarters of the Bank of Manhattan, seemed to have secured the title. At Lexington Avenue and 42nd Street, auto executive Walter Chrysler and his architect William Van Alen developed plans to build the structure's trademark 185-foot (56 m) spire in secret, pushing the Chrysler Building to 1,046 feet (319 m) and making it the tallest in the world when it was completed in 1929. Completed in 1930, the Chrysler Building is a distinctive symbol of New York. Originally built for the Chrysler Corporation, the building is presently co-owned by Aby Rosen's RFR Holding LLC, in a joint venture with the Austrian SIGNA Group. The Chrysler Building was the first structure in the world to surpass the 1,000 foot threshold.

Both buildings were soon surpassed with the May 1931 completion of the 102-story Empire State Building with its tower reaching 1,250 feet (380 m) at the top of the building. The 203-foot (62 m) high pinnacle was later added bringing the total height of the building to 1,453 ft (443 m). The Empire State Building, a contemporary Art Deco style building in Midtown Manhattan, was designed by Shreve, Lamb and Harmon and takes its name from the nickname of New York State. It was the first building to go beyond the 100-story mark, and has one of the world's most visited observation decks, which sees about 4 million visitors a year. The building was built in just 14 months. 30 Rockefeller Plaza is a slim Art Deco skyscraper and the focal point of Rockefeller Center. It stands 850 ft (259 m) with 70 floors. Built in 1933 and originally called the RCA Building, it was later called the Comcast Building. The frieze above the main entrance was executed by Lee Lawrie and depicts Wisdom, along with a phrase from scripture that reads "Wisdom and Knowledge shall be the stability of thy times", originally found in the Book of Isaiah, 33:6.

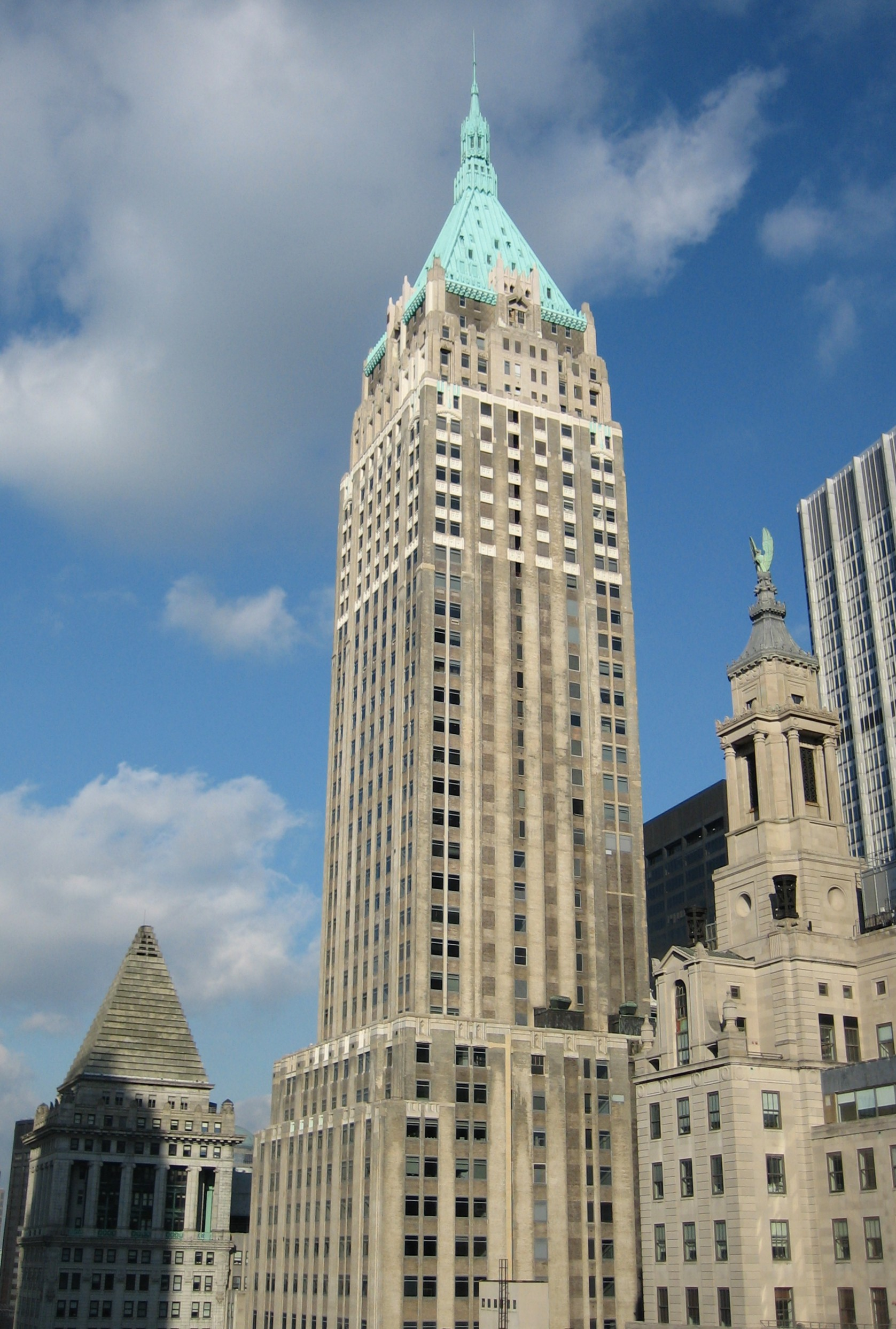
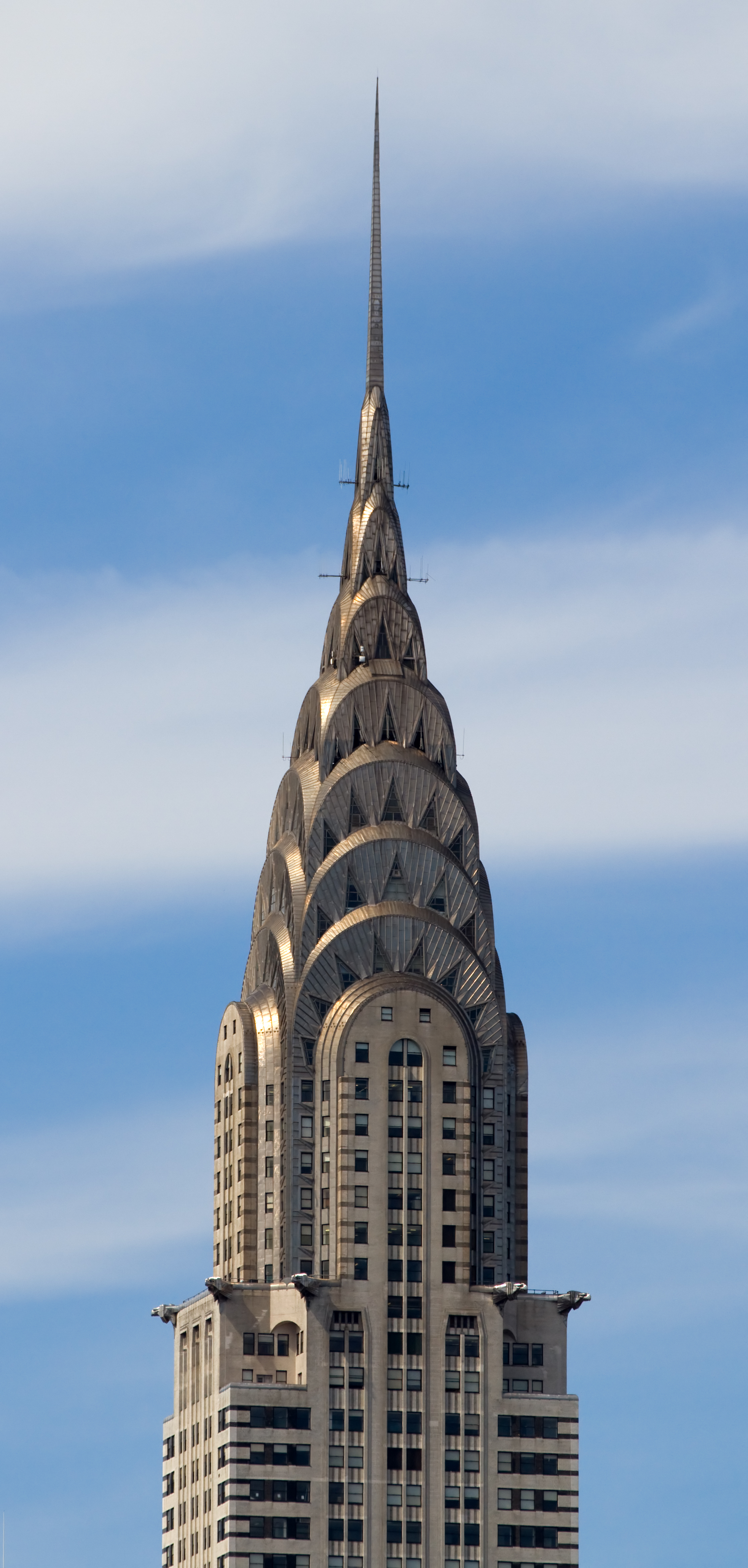
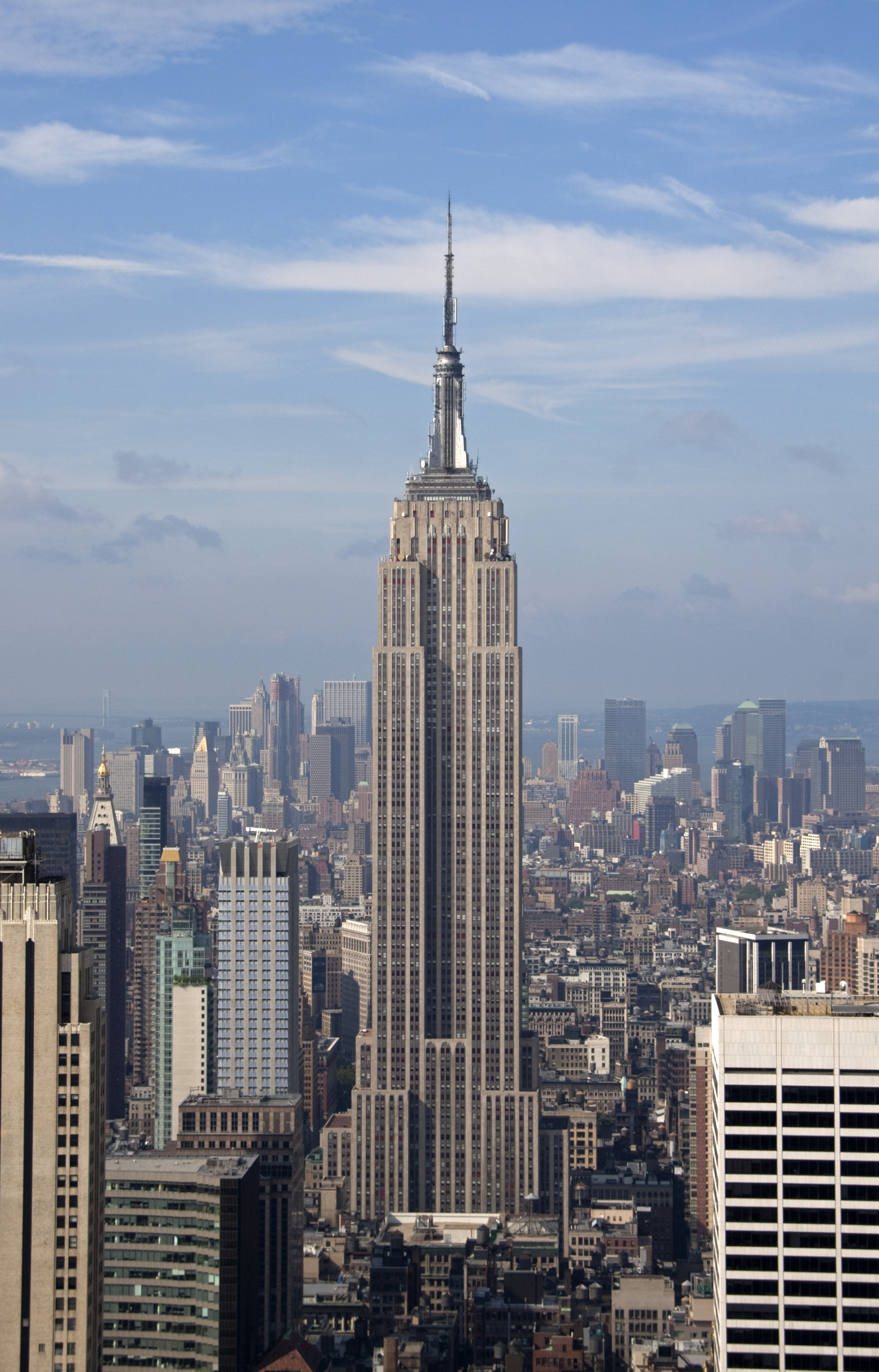
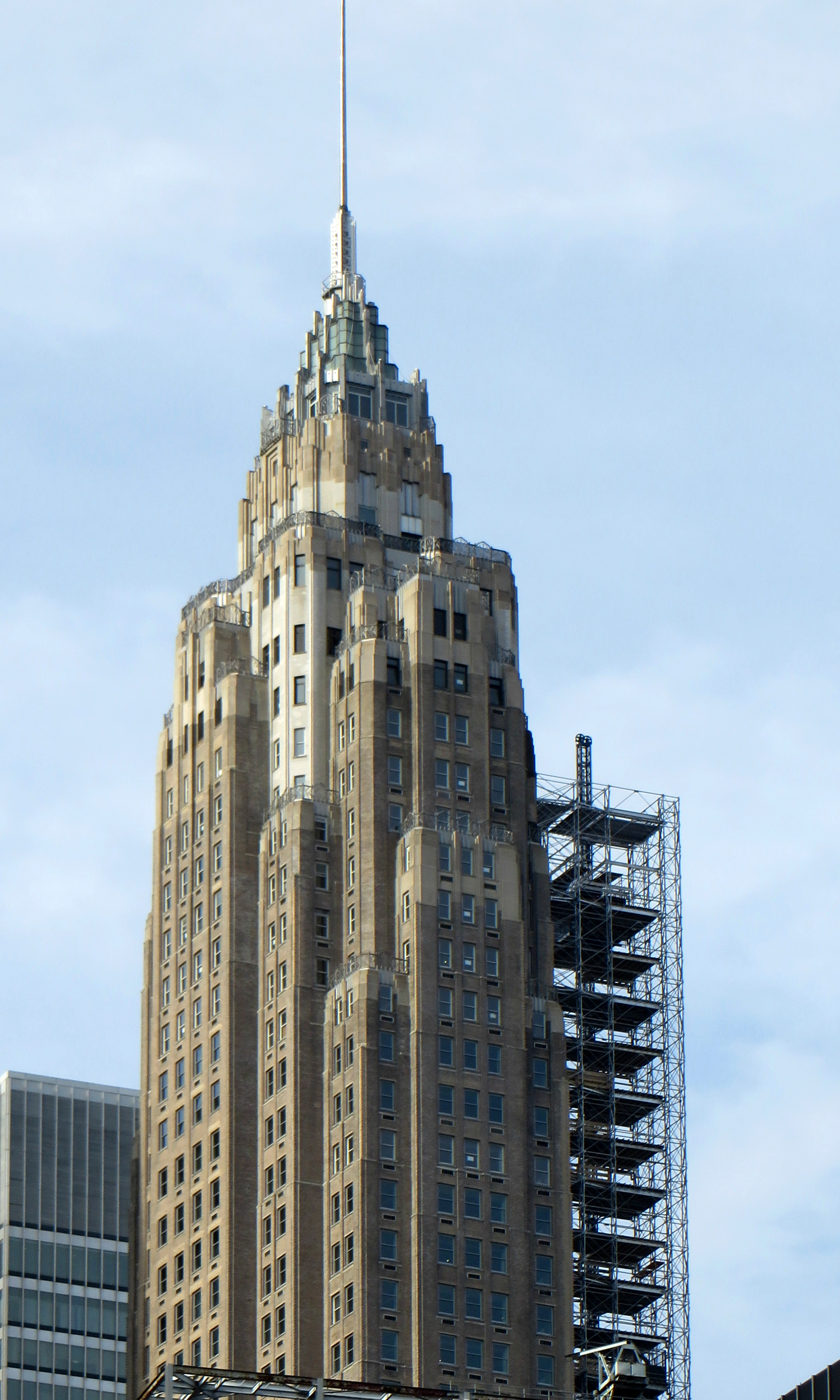
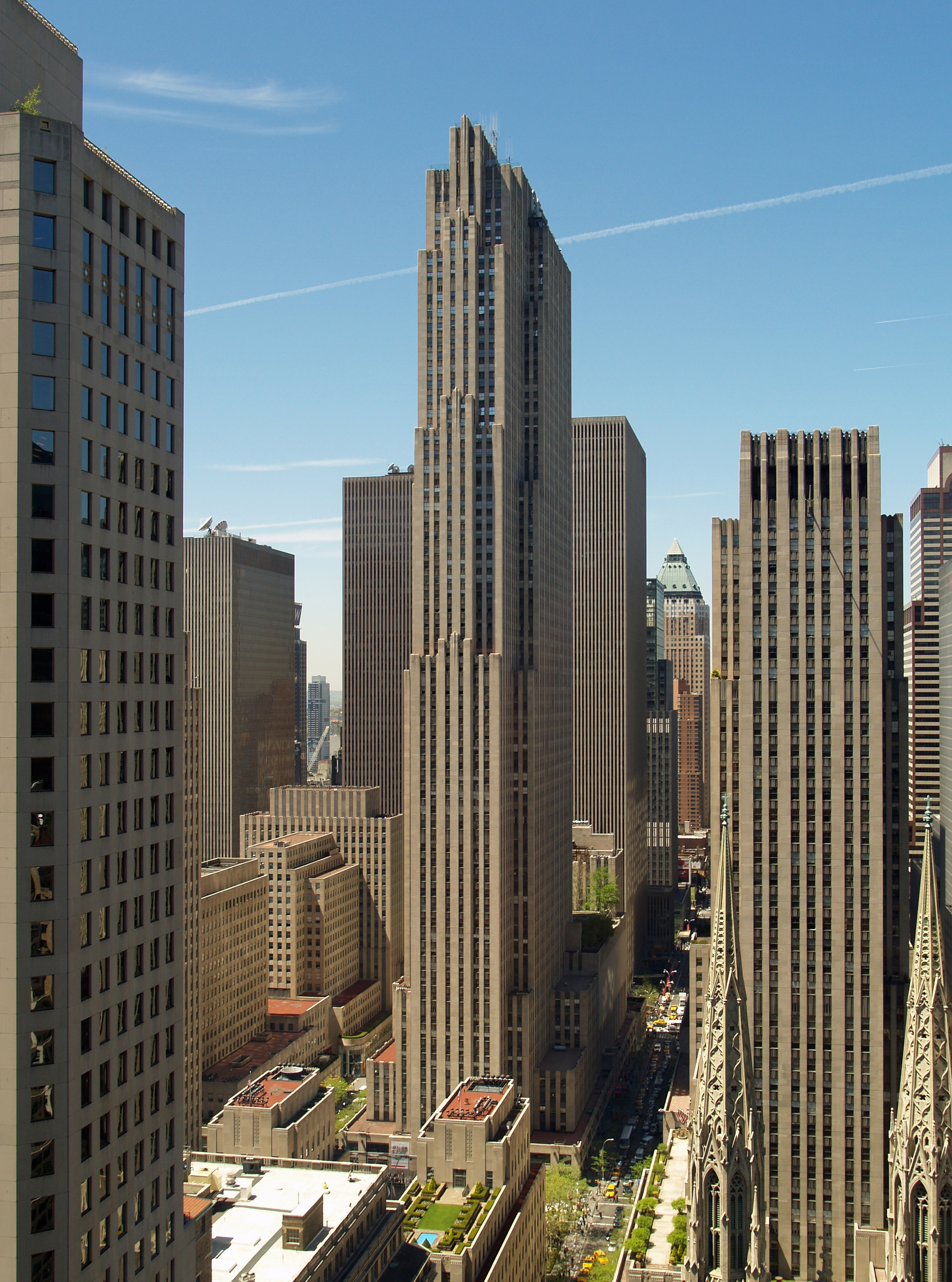
40 Wall Street (1930), Chrysler Building (1930), Empire State Building (1931), American International Building (1932), 30 Rockefeller Plaza (1933)

330 West 42nd Street (1931) was the only skyscraper in New York City displayed in Henry-Russell Hitchcock and Philip Johnson's influential International Style exhibition at the Museum of Modern Art in 1932, and the only other U.S. skyscraper at that exhibition, besides the PSFS Building. Johnson, along with Ludwig Mies van der Rohe, later helped build the Seagram Building (1959) on Park Avenue between 52nd and 53rd Streets, with extruded bronze mullions on the facade. Paul Goldberger wrote in The New York Times in 1976 that the Seagram Building was one of "New York's most copied buildings", its design having been copied in several structures worldwide.

=== Late 20th century ===
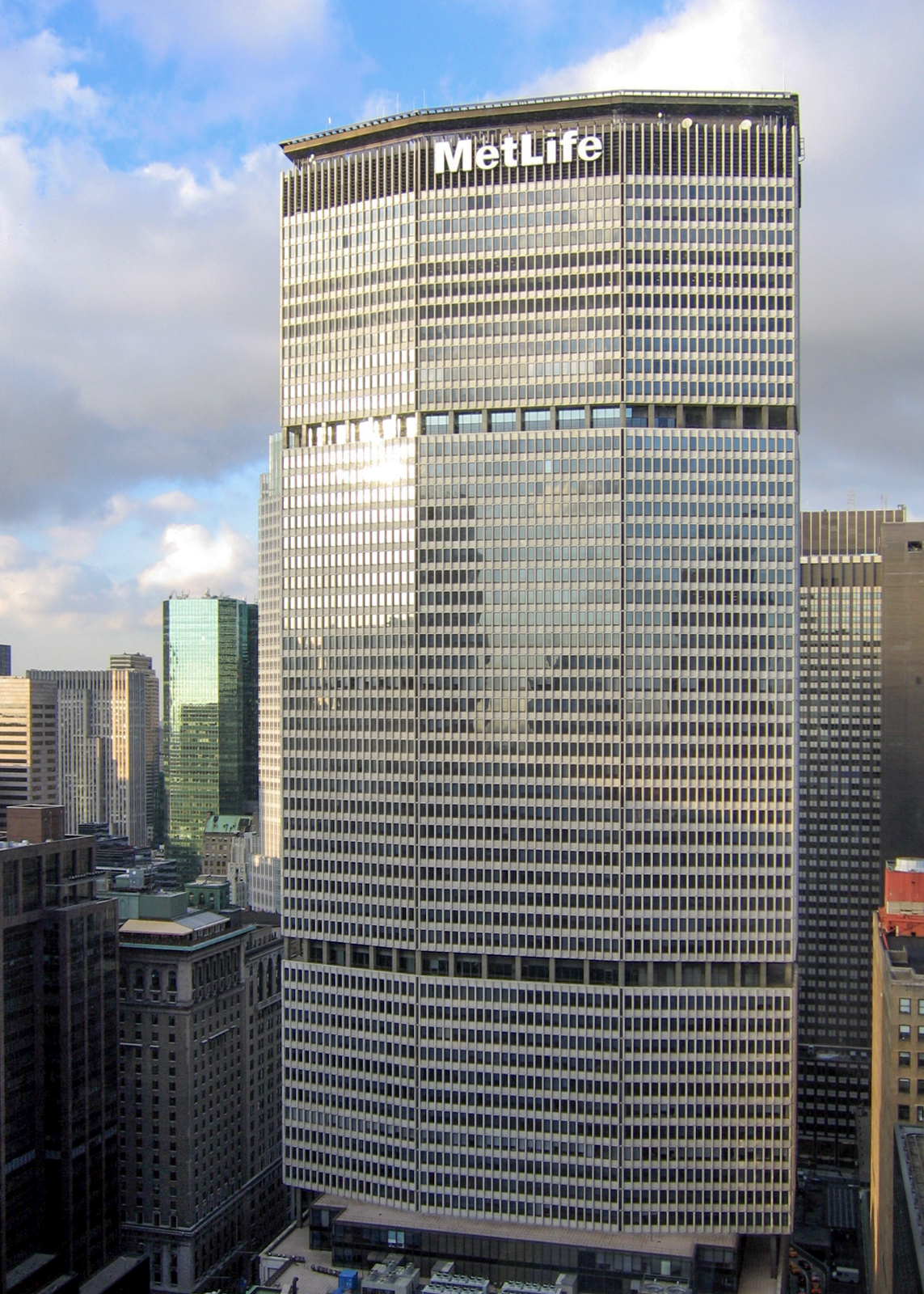
MetLife Building (1963)

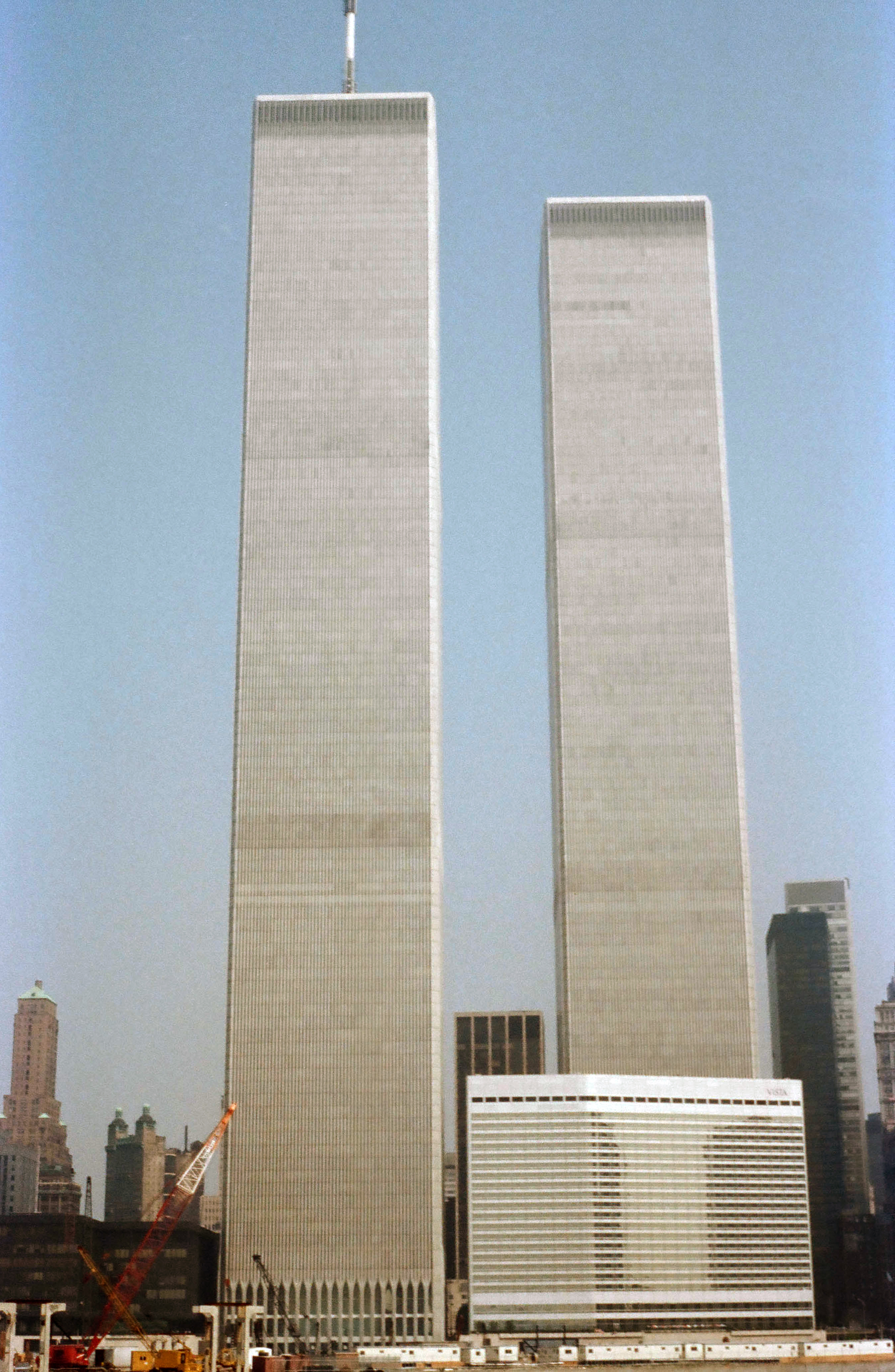
Twin Towers, World Trade Center (1973)

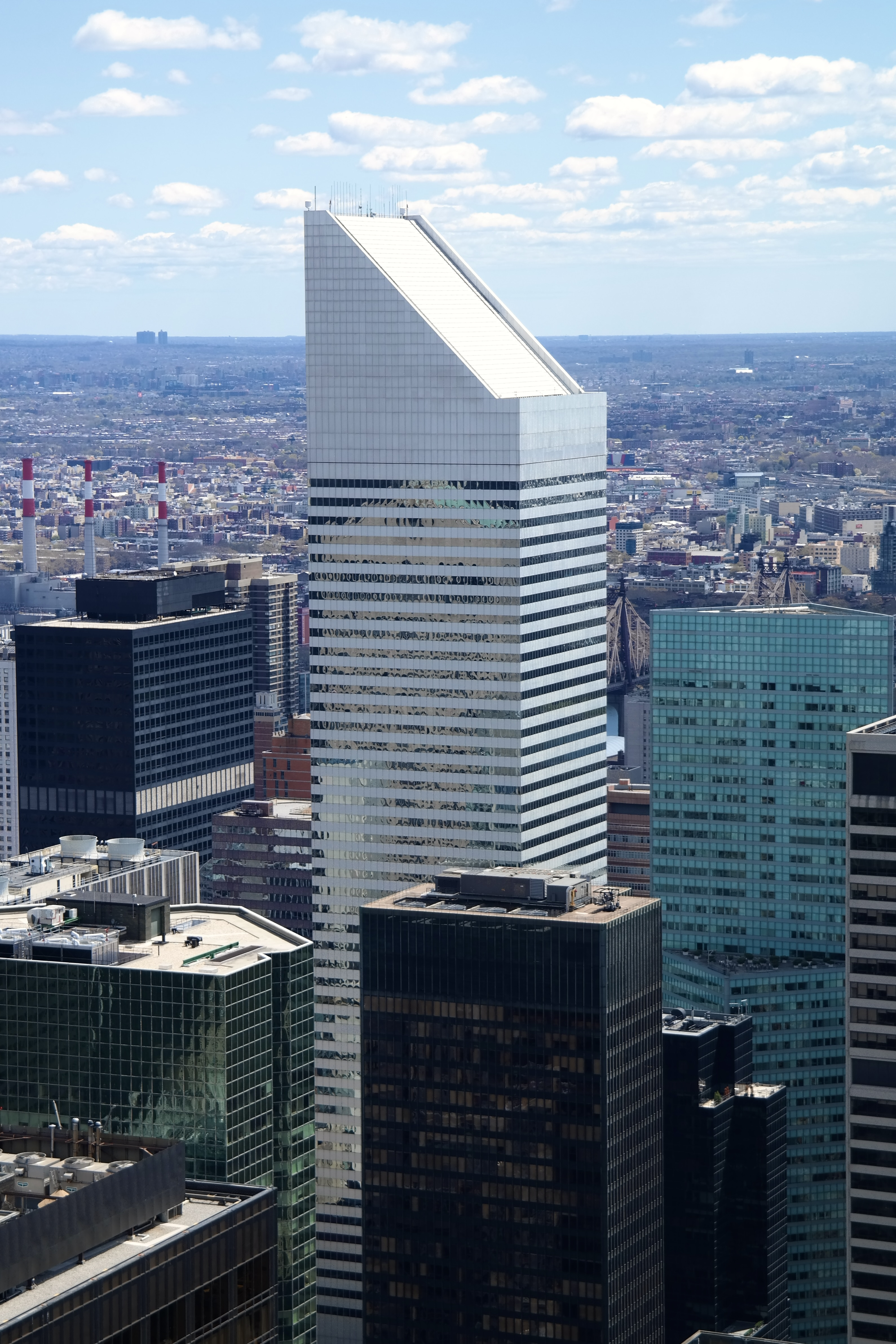
Citigroup Center (1977)

In 1961, the Pennsylvania Railroad unveiled plans to tear down the old Penn Station and replace it with a new Madison Square Garden and office building complex. Organized protests were aimed at preserving the McKim, Mead & White-designed structure completed in 1910, widely considered a masterpiece of the Beaux-Arts style and one of the architectural jewels of New York City. Despite these efforts, demolition of the structure began in October 1963. The loss of Penn Station—called "an act of irresponsible public vandalism" by historian Lewis Mumford—led directly to the enactment in 1965 of a local law establishing the New York City Landmarks Preservation Commission, which is responsible for preserving the "city's historic, aesthetic, and cultural heritage". The historic preservation movement triggered by Penn Station's demise has been credited with the retention of some one million structures nationwide, including over 1,000 in New York City. In 2017, a multibillion-dollar rebuilding plan was unveiled to restore the historic grandeur of Penn Station, in the process of upgrading the landmark's status as a critical transportation hub.

The MetLife Building, formerly the Pan Am Building, was the largest commercial office building in the world when it opened on March 7, 1963. It stands directly north of Grand Central Terminal. The former Twin Towers of the World Trade Center were located in Lower Manhattan. At 1,368 and 1,362 feet (417 and 415 m), the 110-story buildings were the world's tallest from 1972 until they were surpassed by the construction of the Willis Tower in 1974 (formerly known as the Sears Tower, located in Chicago). One World Trade Center, a replacement for the Twin Towers of the World Trade Center, is currently the tallest building in the Western Hemisphere.

Citigroup Center is a 59-story office tower located at 53rd Street and Lexington Avenue in Midtown Manhattan. It is considered one of the most important post-war skyscrapers to be in erected in New York City. The striking design of the steeply slanted roof, the sleek aluminum-clad facade, and its base on four stilts over a church also on the site made the skyscraper an instant architectural icon. The sloping roof houses the building's mechanical and ventilation systems. The designers settled on an aluminum-clad facade to reduce the weight load on the building's foundation and support structures, since its entire weight would be supported by stilts. To prevent swaying, a "tuned mass damper" was later added on the roof.

=== 21st century ===
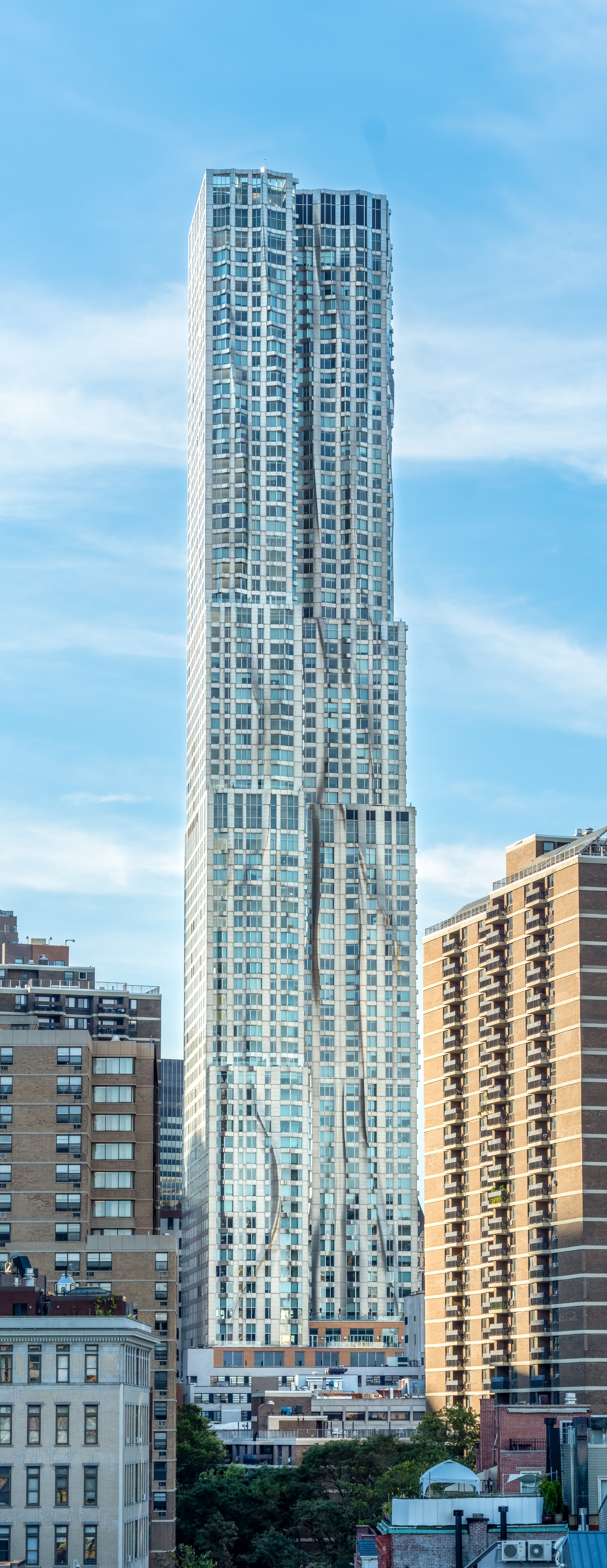
8 Spruce Street (2006)

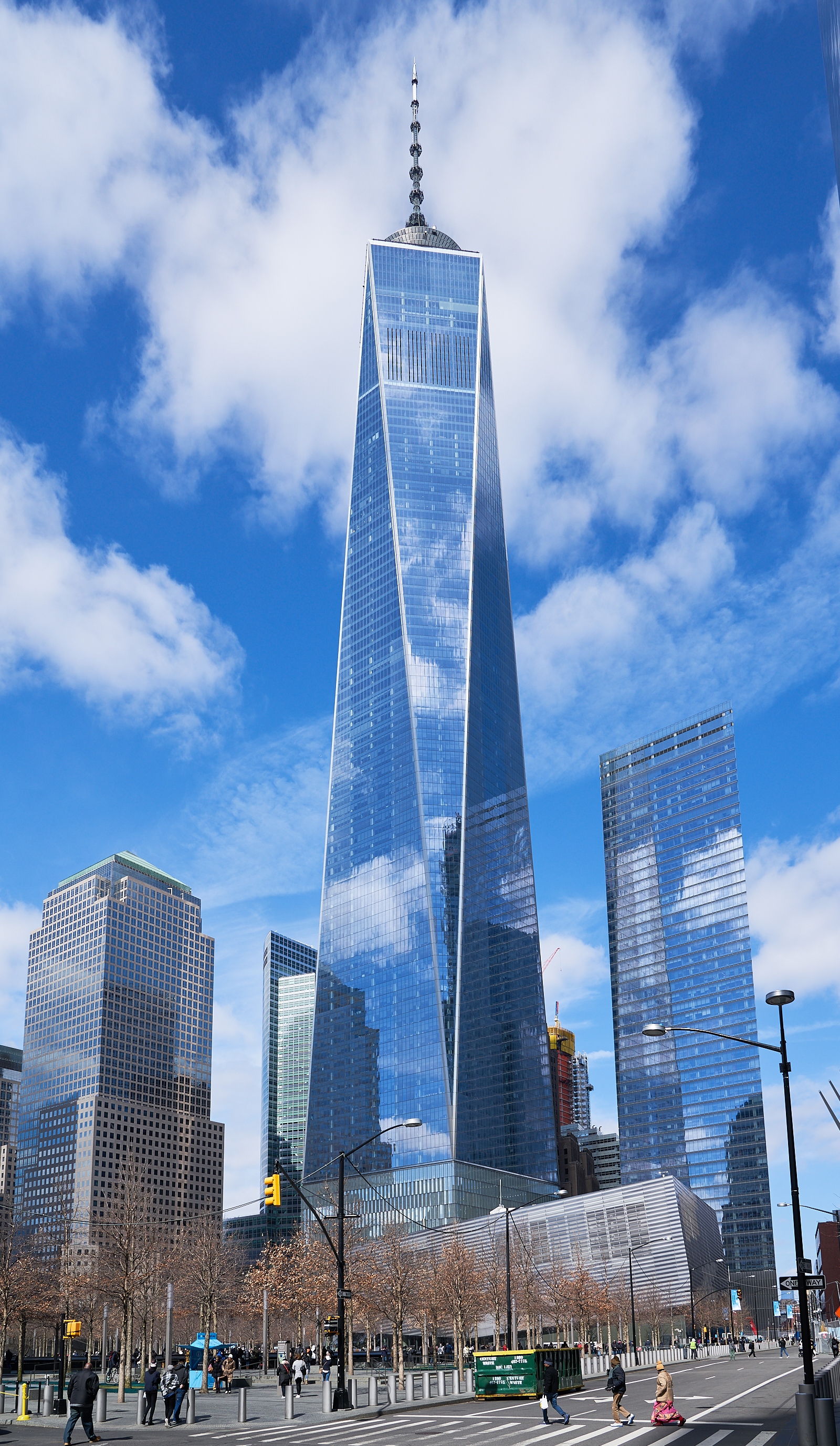
One World Trade Center (2013)

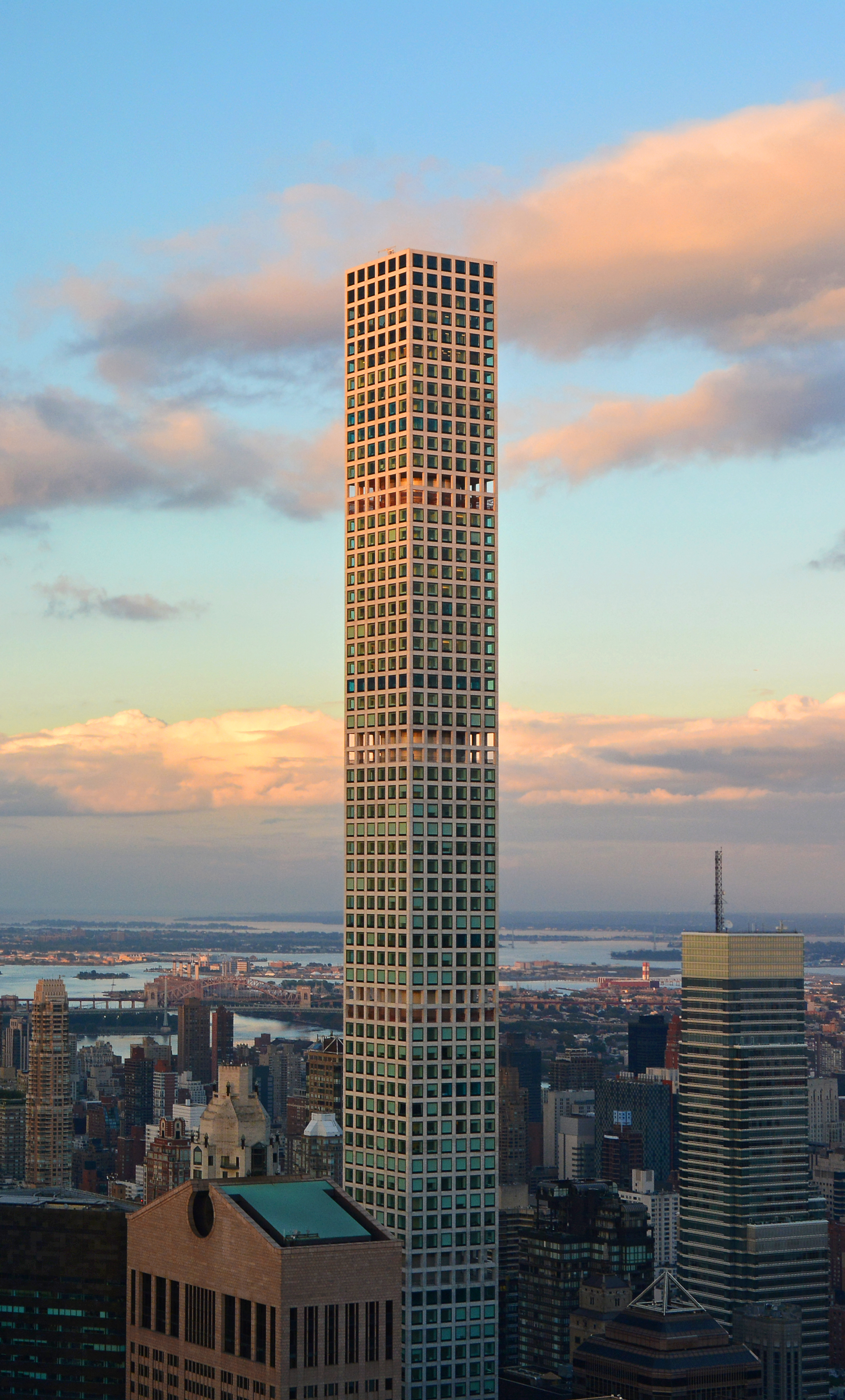
432 Park Avenue (2015)

Time Warner Center is a mixed-use skyscraper at Columbus Circle on Manhattan's Upper West Side. It was the first major building to be completed since the September 11 attacks.

The Condé Nast Building, officially Four Times Square, is a modern skyscraper in Times Square in Midtown Manhattan and one of the most important examples of green design in skyscrapers in the United States. Environmentally friendly gas-fired absorption chillers, along with a high-performing insulating and shading curtain wall, ensure that the building does not need to be heated or cooled for the majority of the year. Office furniture is made with biodegradable and non-toxic materials. The air-delivery system provides 50% more fresh air than is required by New York City Building Code, and a number of recycling chutes serve the entire building. Being the first project of its size to undertake these features in construction, the building has received an award from the American Institute of Architects, as well as AIA New York State.

Hearst Tower, located in Midtown Manhattan at 300 West 57th Street, is another example of the new breed of green design skyscrapers in New York City. Hearst Tower is a glass and steel construction skyscraper which rests on the base of the original 1920s Hearst Corporation Building. Hearst Tower is easily identified by the dramatic interlocking triangular glass panels designed by British architect Lord Norman Foster. Hearst Tower is also the first skyscraper in New York City to be awarded the coveted Gold LEED Certified rating by the United States Green Building Council.

== Tallest buildings ==
The 15 tallest buildings:

Std. rank	Name	Year	Location (Midtown & Lower Manhattan)	Height ft (m)	Floors (Note: Floor counts often vary among sources, this list uses the number most widely reported in reference.)	Notes
1	One World Trade Center	2014	285 Fulton Street	1,776 (541)	94 (Note: The building is 104 standard floors tall and most references supply this figure. However, only 94 actual, physically usable, stories are present; see the skyscraper's main article for more details.)	
2	Central Park Tower	2021	225 West 57th Street	1,550 (472)	99	
3	111 West 57th Street	2022	111 West 57th Street	1,428 (435)	85	
4	One Vanderbilt	2020	1 Vanderbilt Avenue	1,401 (427)	73	
5	432 Park Avenue	2015	432 Park Avenue	1,397 (426)	85	
6	270 Park Avenue	2025	270 Park Avenue	1,388 (423)	60	
7	30 Hudson Yards	2019	500 West 33rd Street	1,270 (387)	73	
8	Empire State Building	1931	350 Fifth Avenue	1,250 (381)	102 (Note: References typically use the 102 floors figure, however some state a value of 103 floors instead due to the presence of an encircling balcony above the 102nd floor. See Empire State Building#Opening and early years and Empire State Building#Above the 102nd floor for a detailed explanation.)	
9	Bank of America Tower	2009	1101 Sixth Avenue	1,200 (366)	55	
10	3 World Trade Center	2018	175 Greenwich Street	1,079 (329)	80	
11	The Brooklyn Tower	2022	9 DeKalb Avenue	1,066 (325)	74	
12	53W53	2019	53 West 53rd Street	1,050 (320)	77	
13	Chrysler Building	1930	405 Lexington Avenue	1,046 (319)	77	
14	The New York Times Building	2007	620 Eighth Avenue	1,046 (319)	52	
15	The Spiral	2022	435 Tenth Avenue	1,031 (314)	66	

== Residential architecture ==
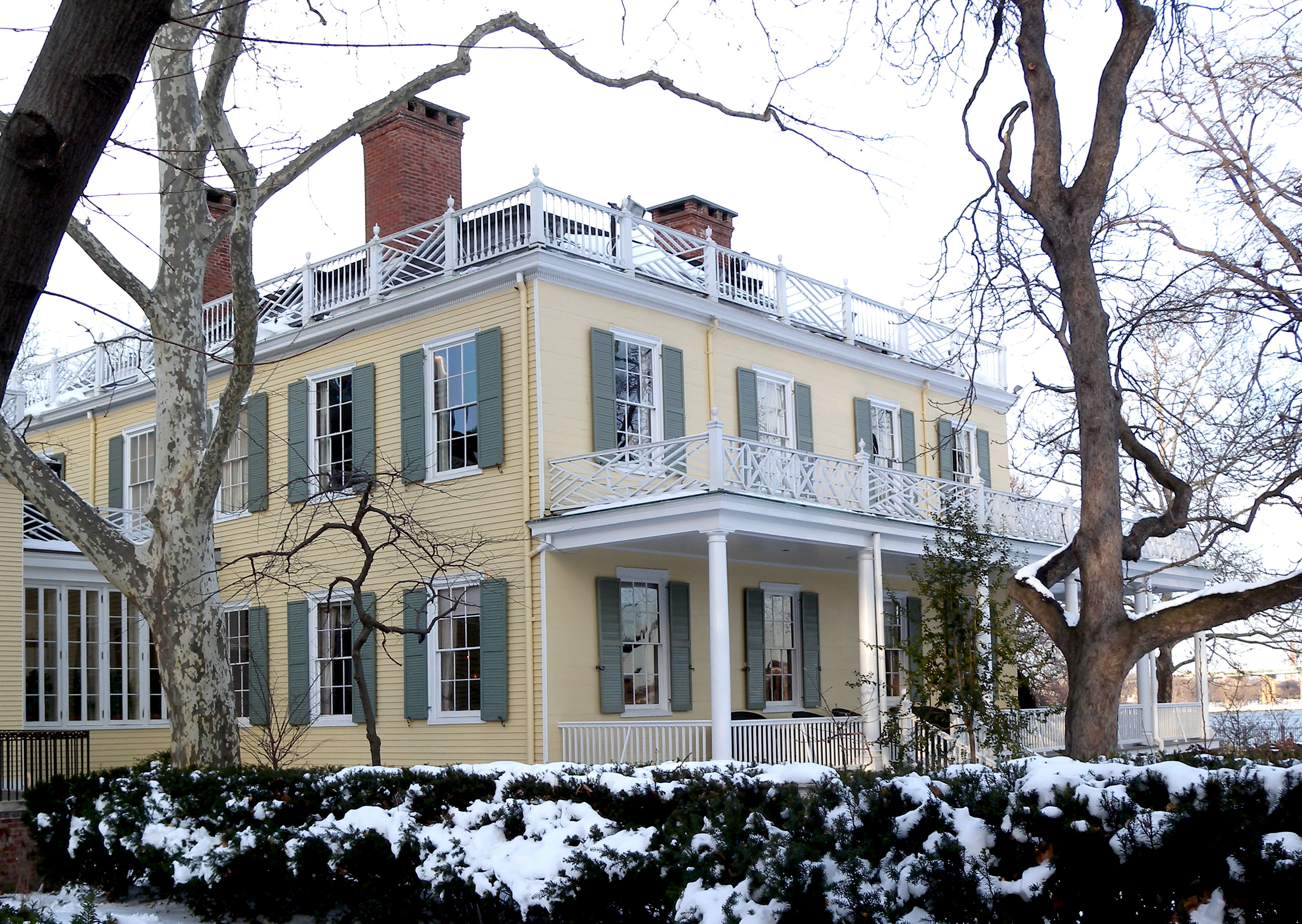
Gracie Mansion, the mayor's official residence.

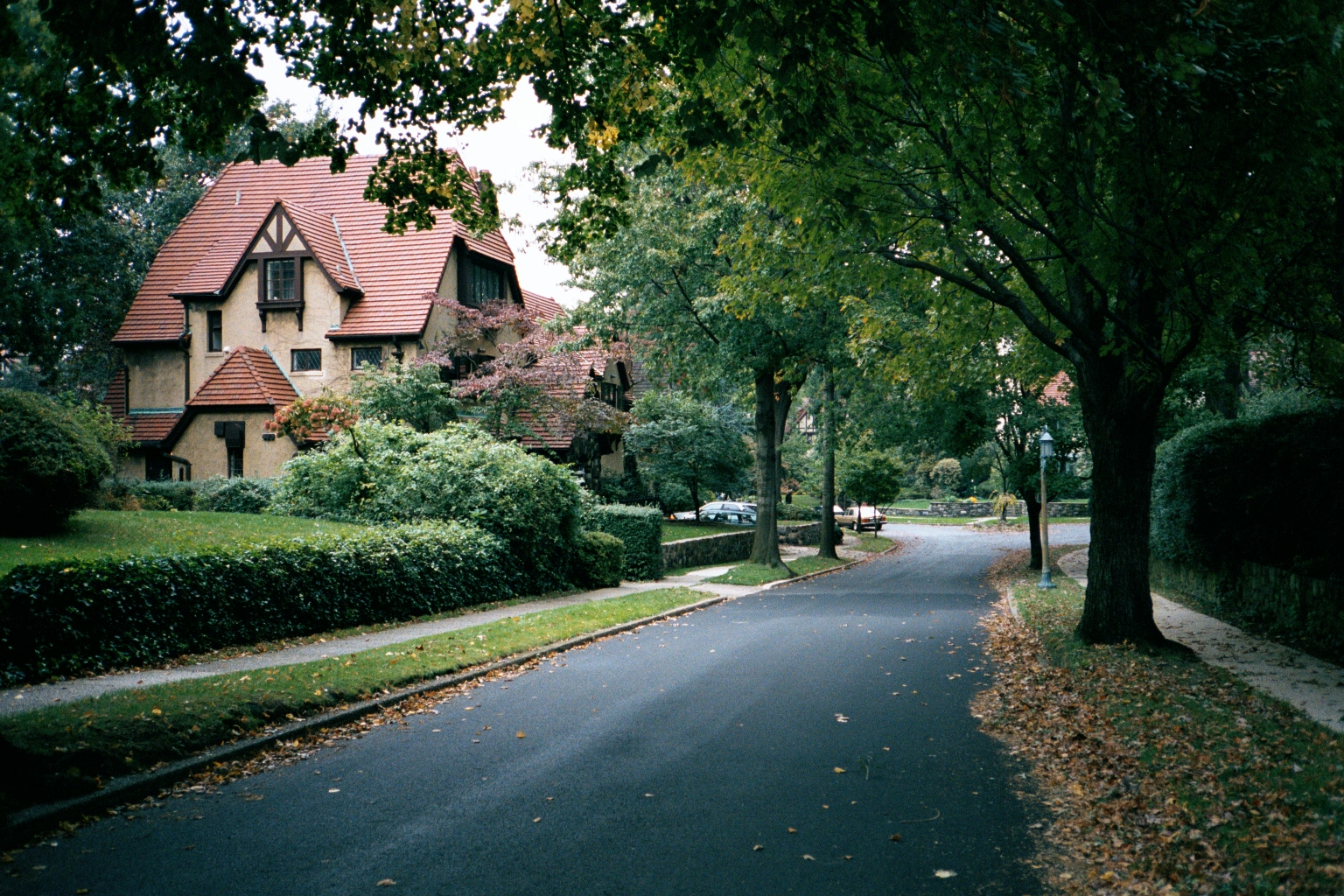
A large single family home in Forest Hills Gardens, Queens.

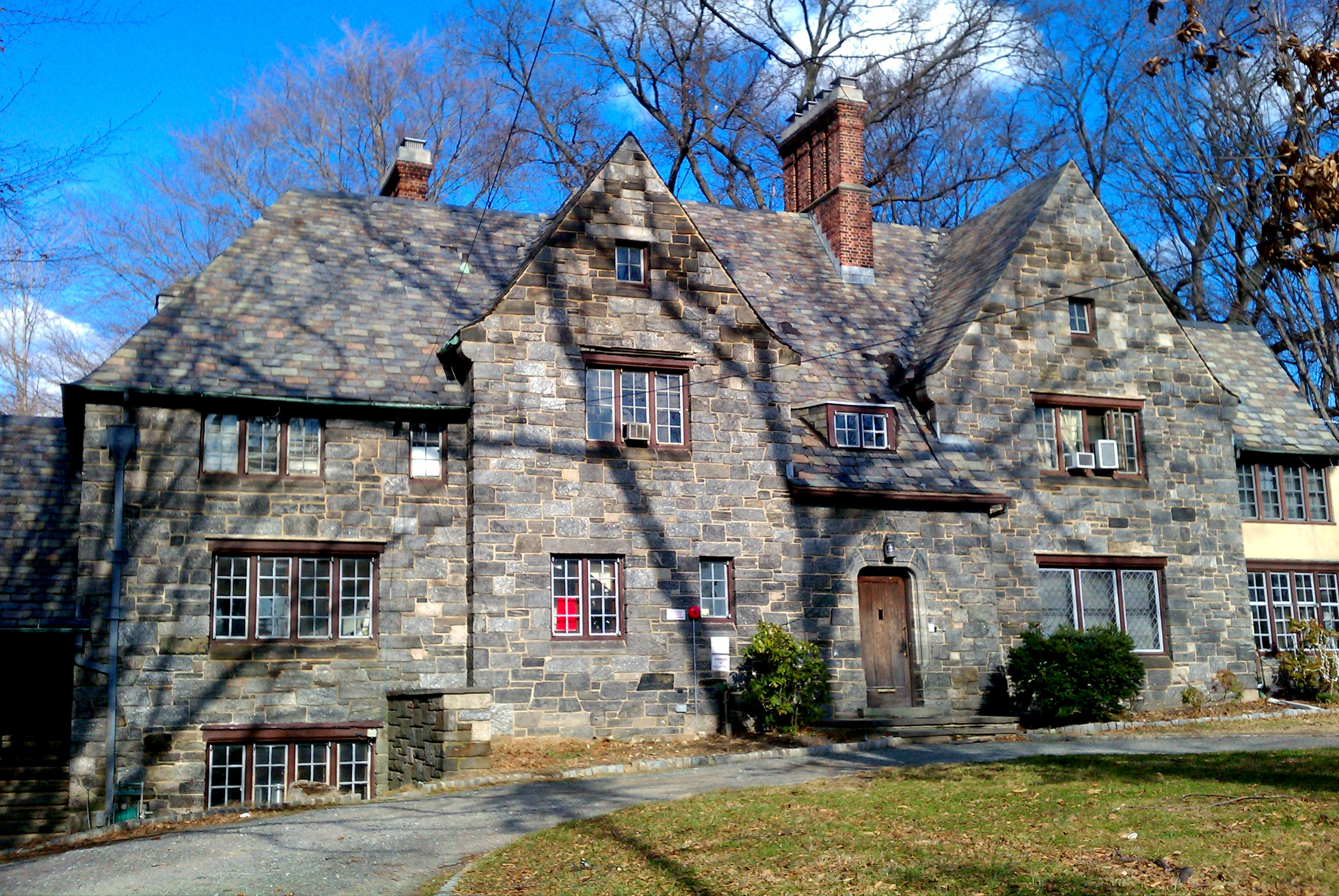
A Tudor Revival style mansion in Flushing, Queens constructed in 1924.

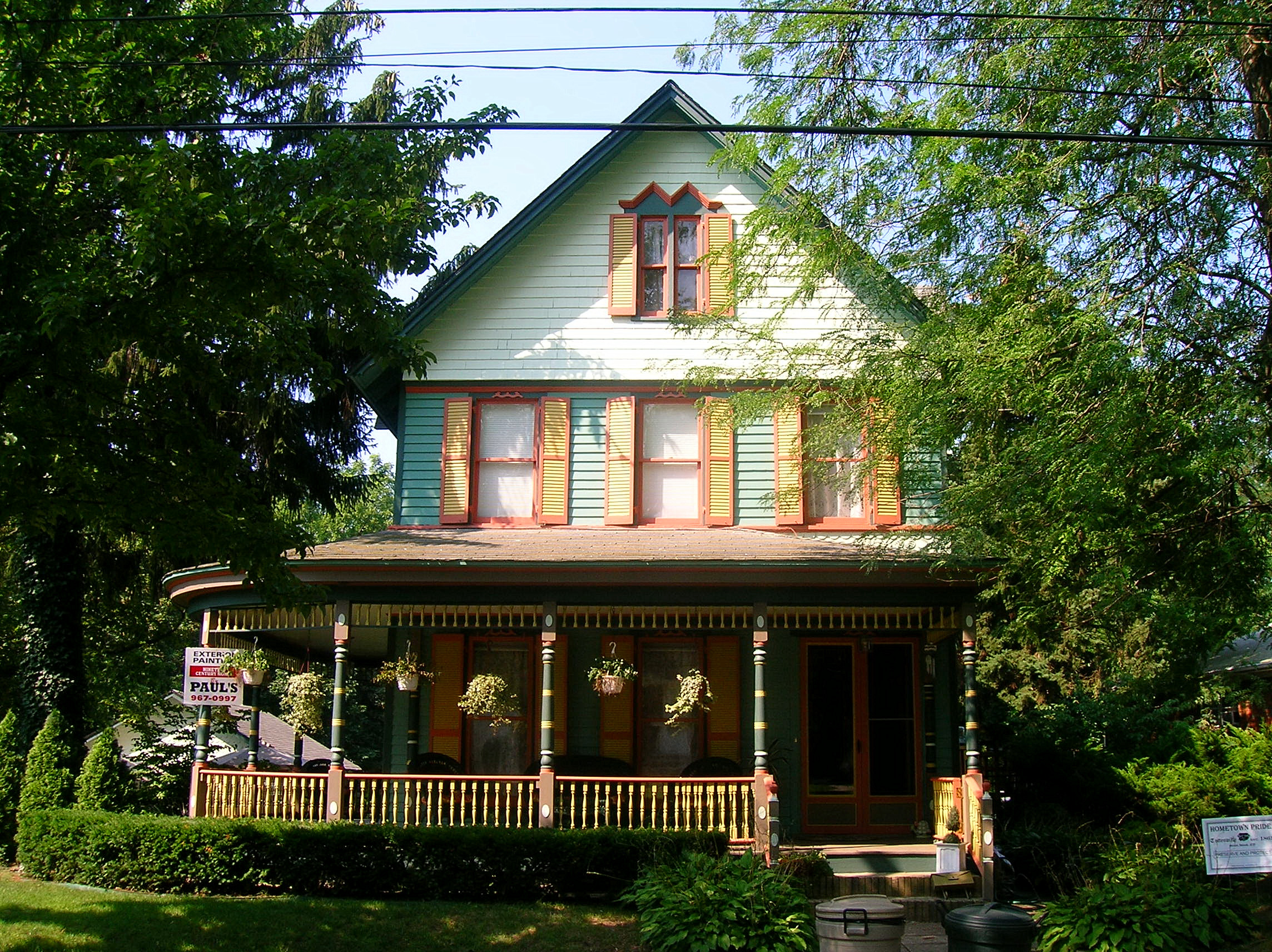
A home in Tottenville, Staten Island.

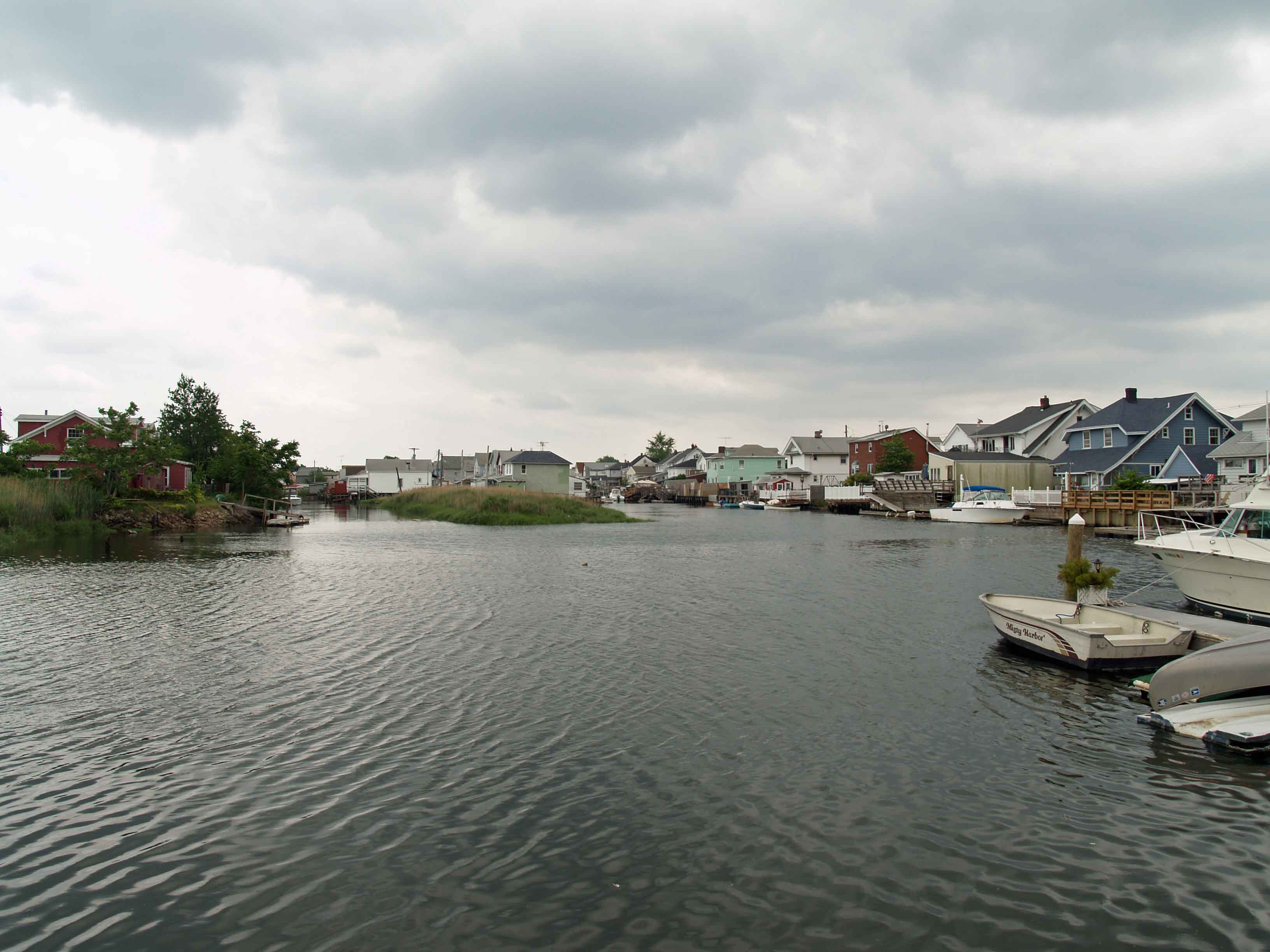
Houses placed on Hawtree Creek in Howard Beach, Queens.

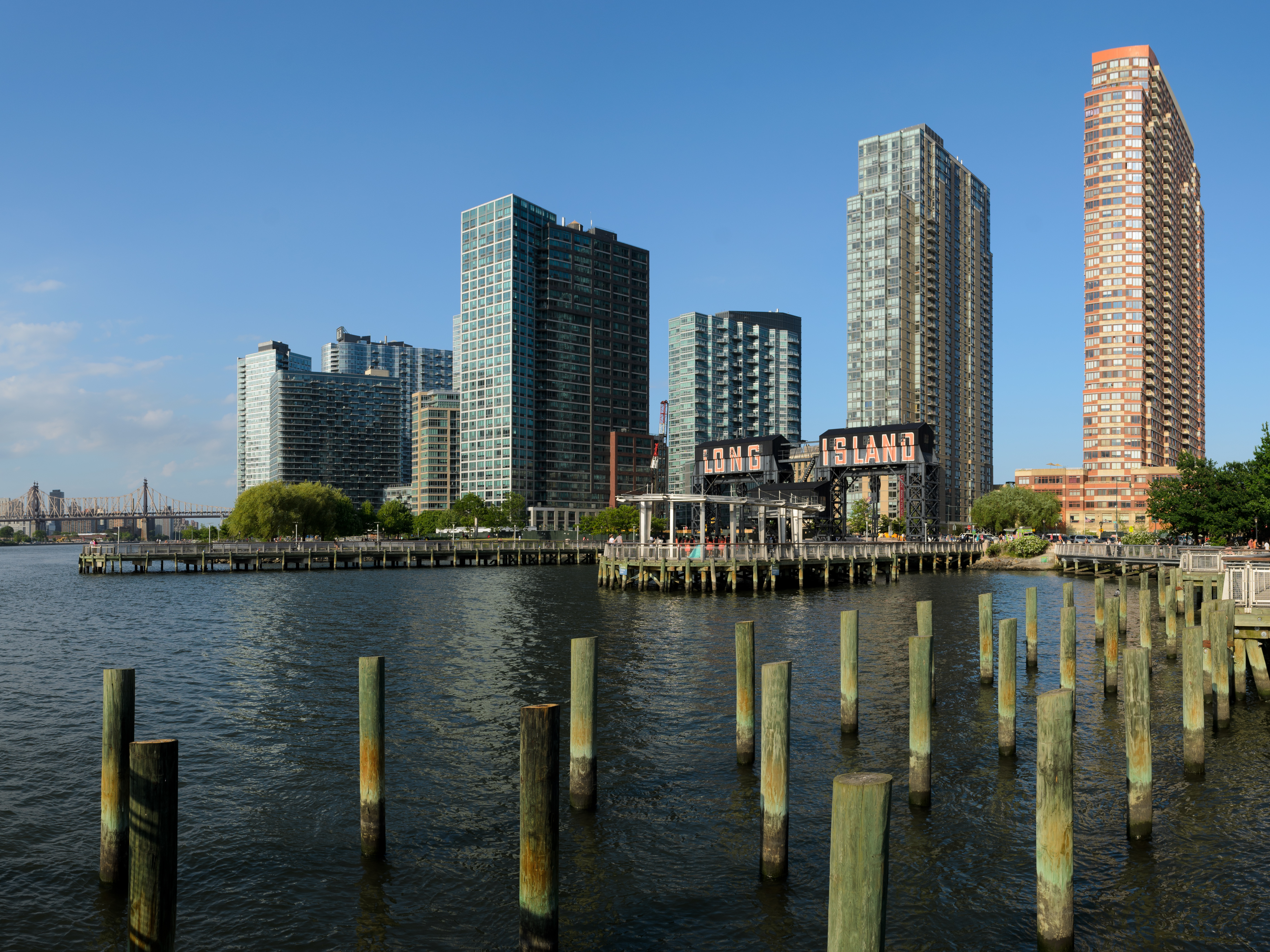
21st century residential towers in Long Island City, Queens

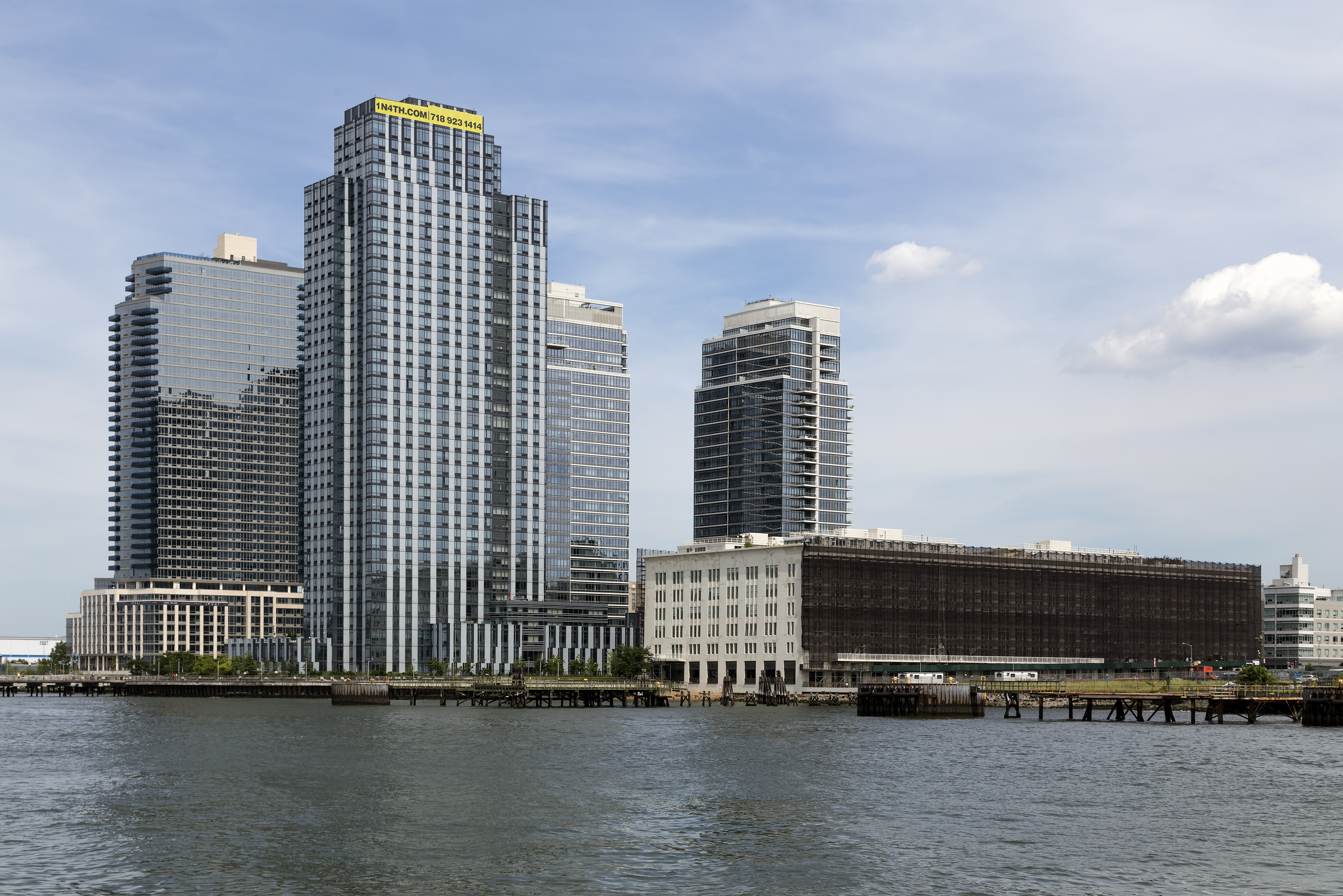
High-rise condominiums on the Williamsburg, Brooklyn waterfront.

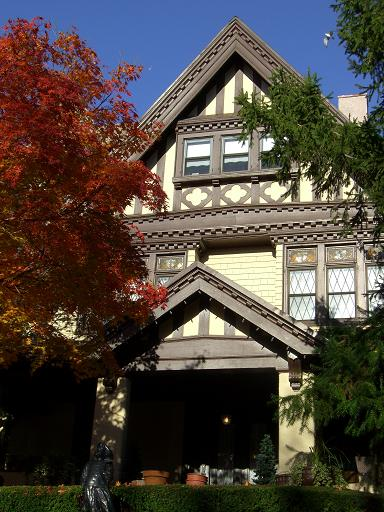
Queen Anne architecture c. 1899 in Dyker Heights, Brooklyn.

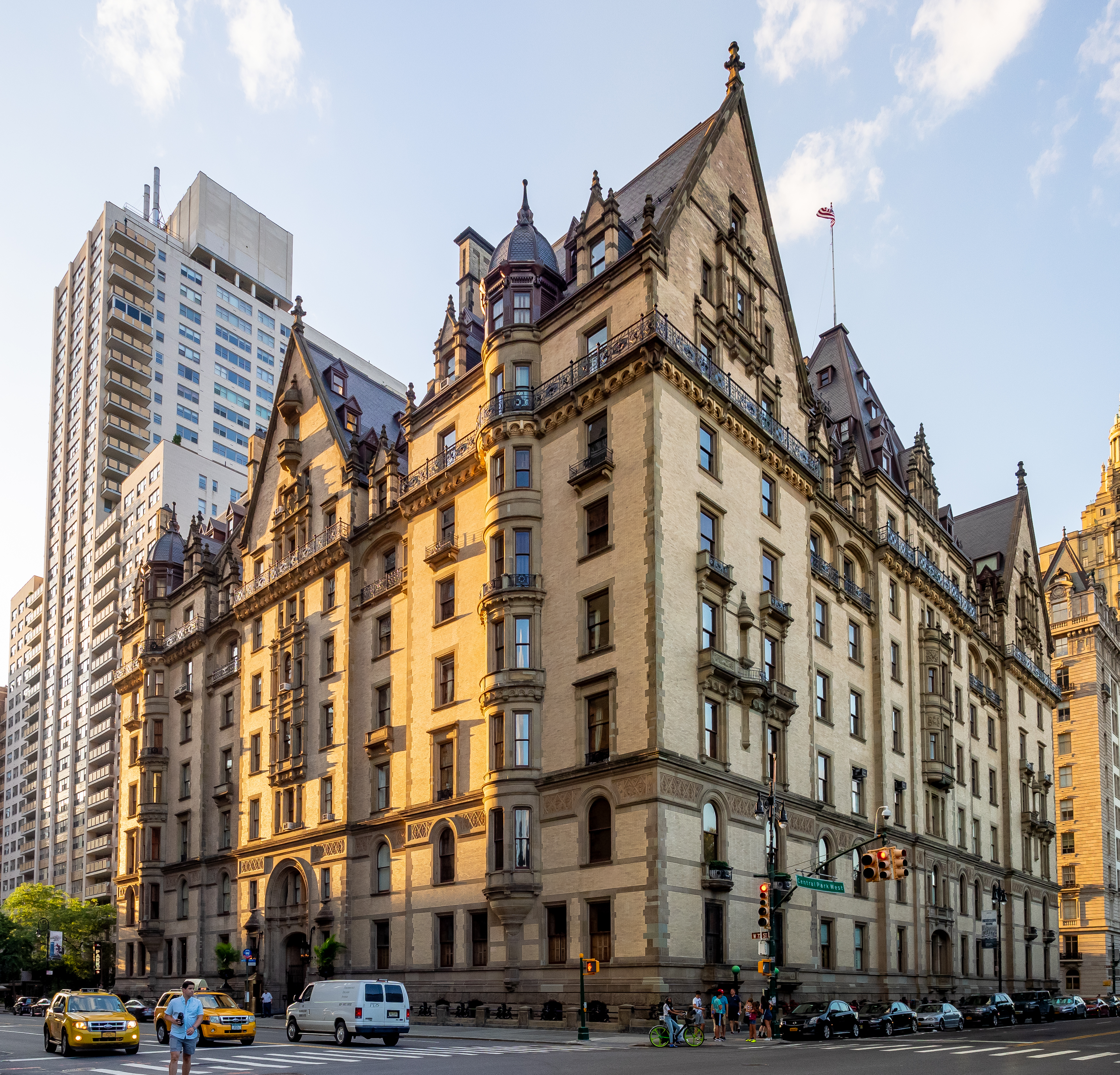
Dakota Building (1881) on the Upper West Side of Manhattan

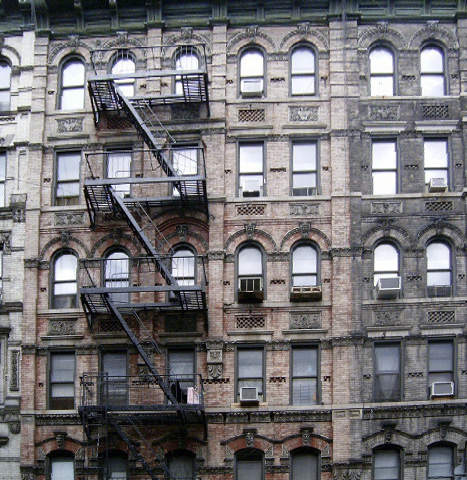
Tenement buildings in the Lower East Side.

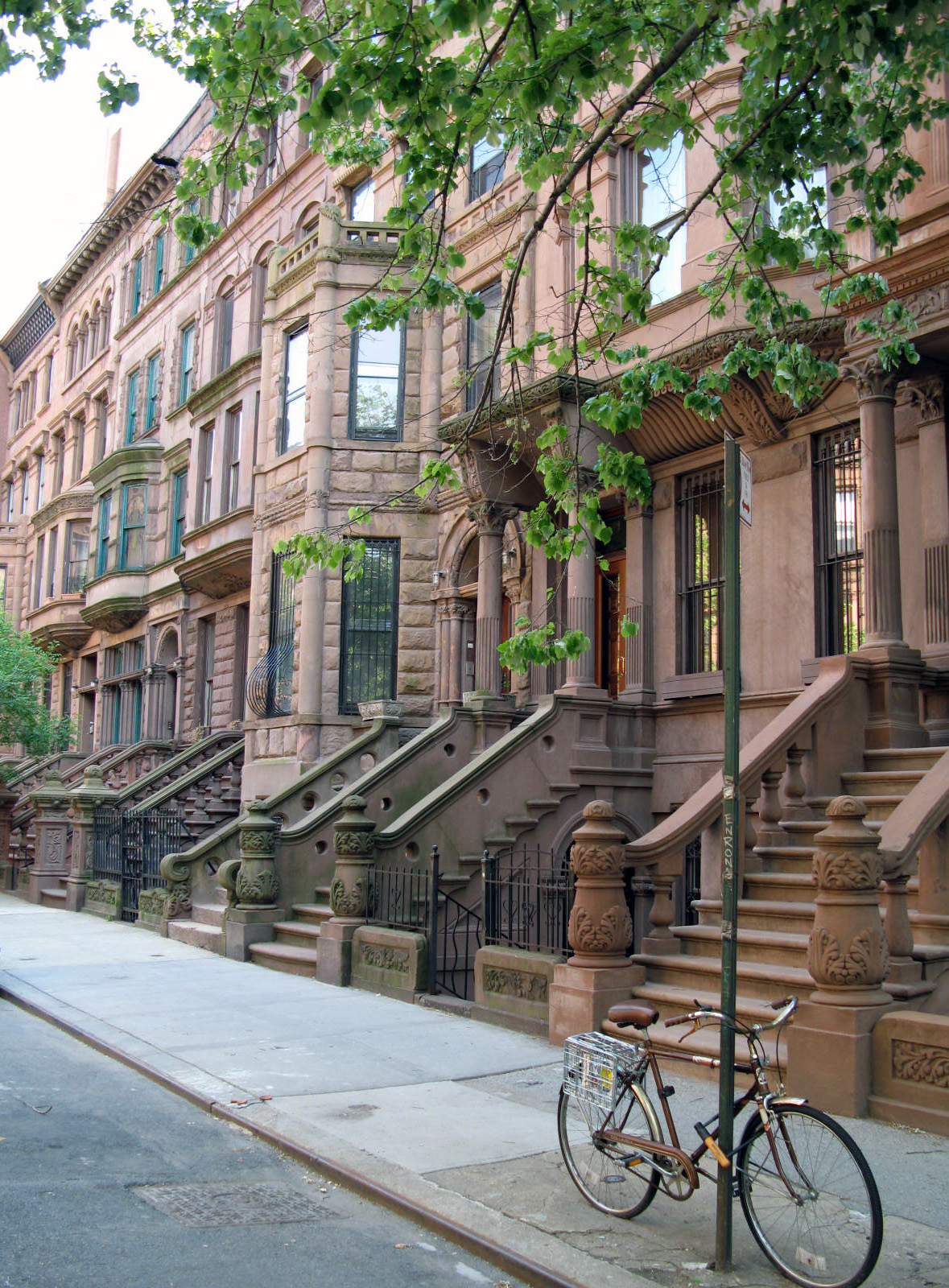
Brownstone townhouses in Harlem.

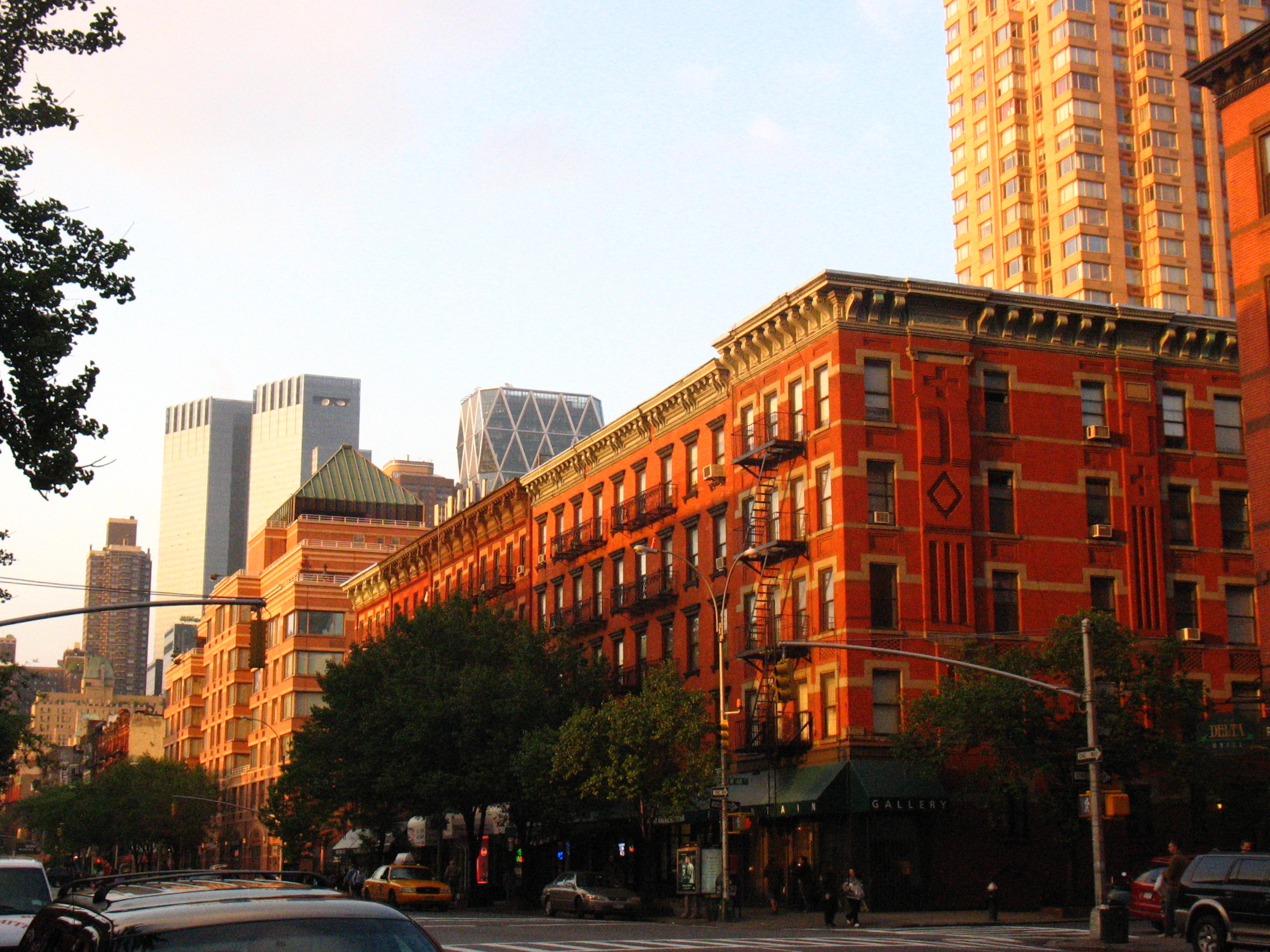
Apartment buildings in Hell's Kitchen.

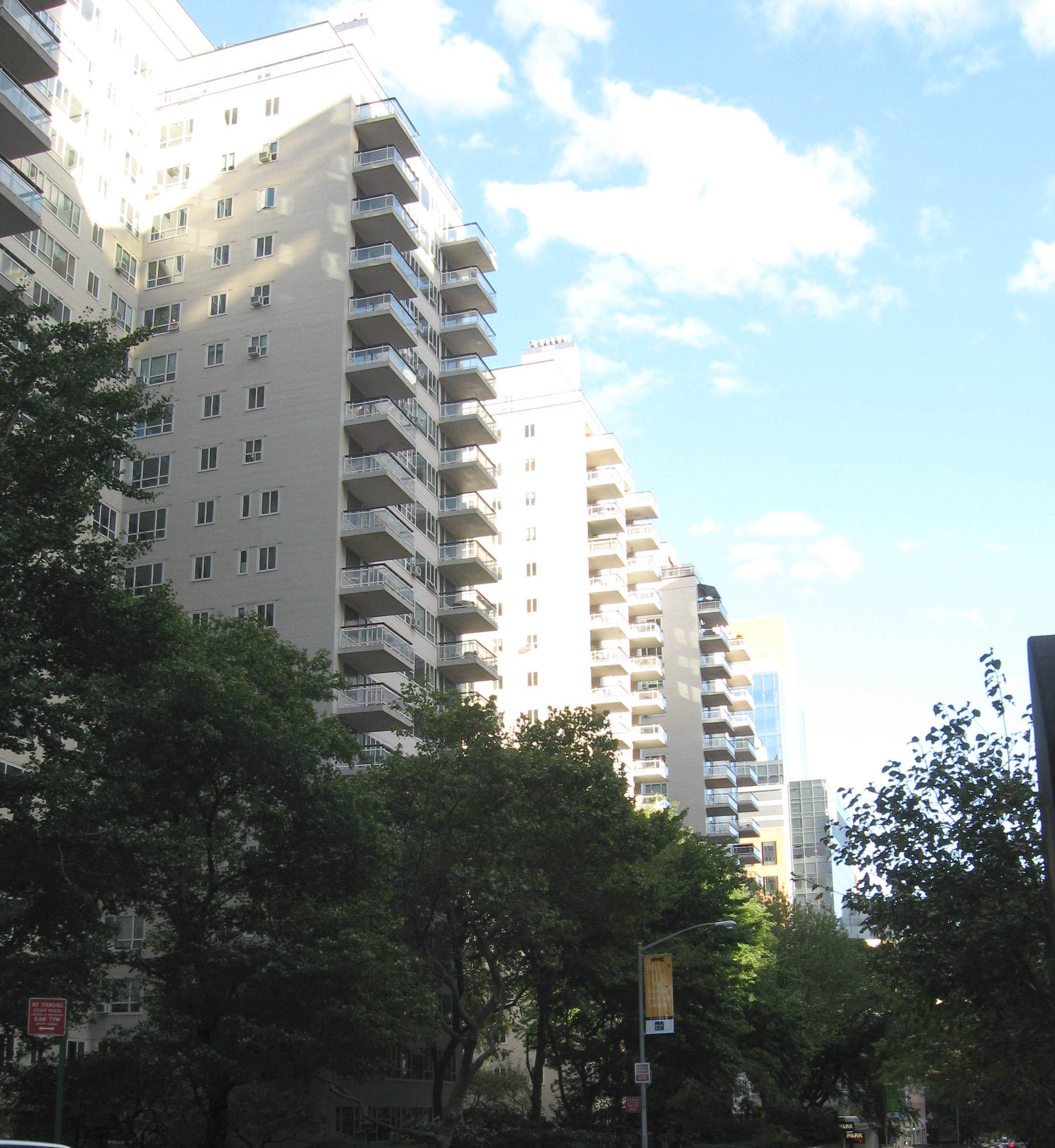
Manhattan House buildings on the Upper East Side.

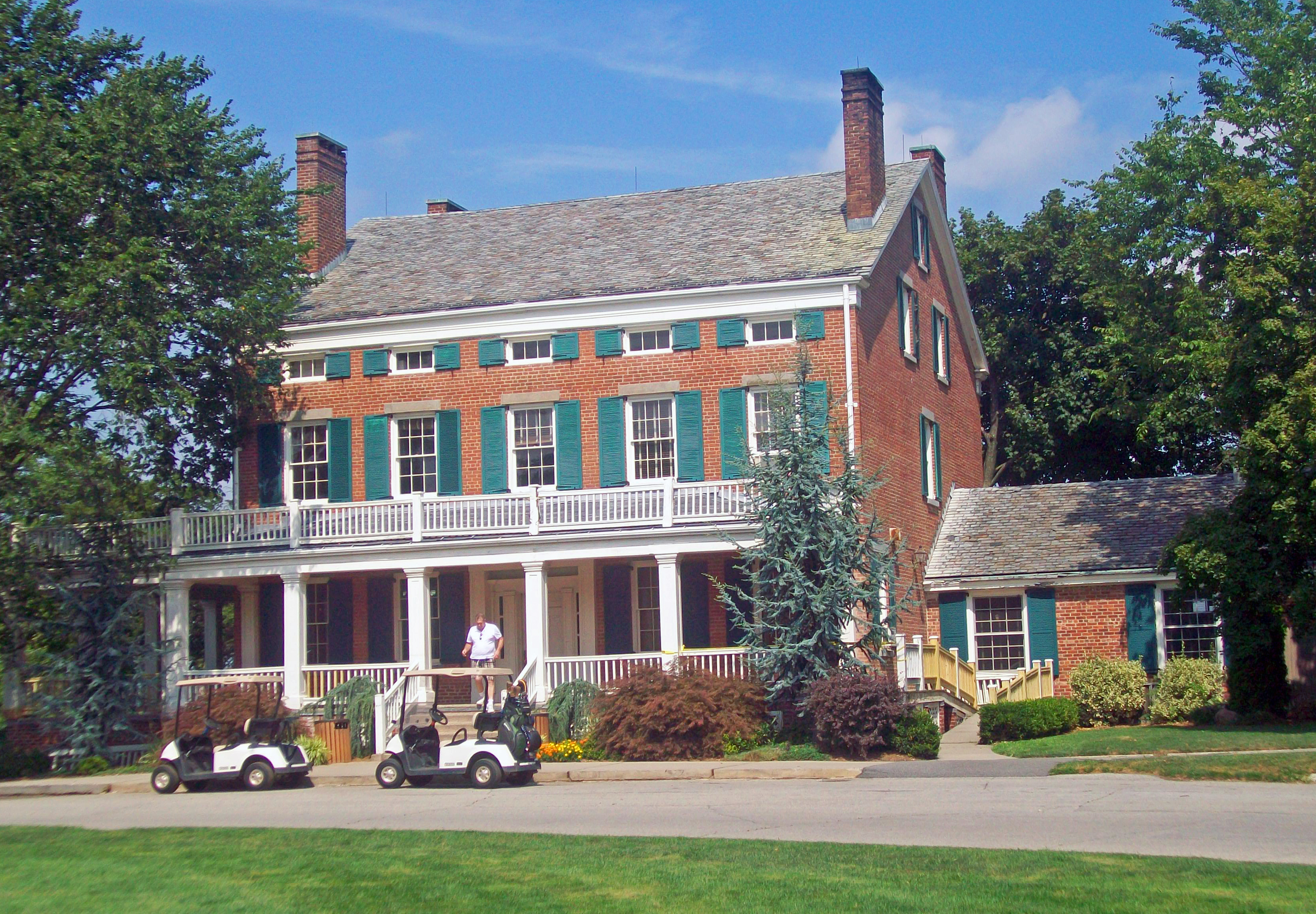
A large home in New Springville, Staten Island.

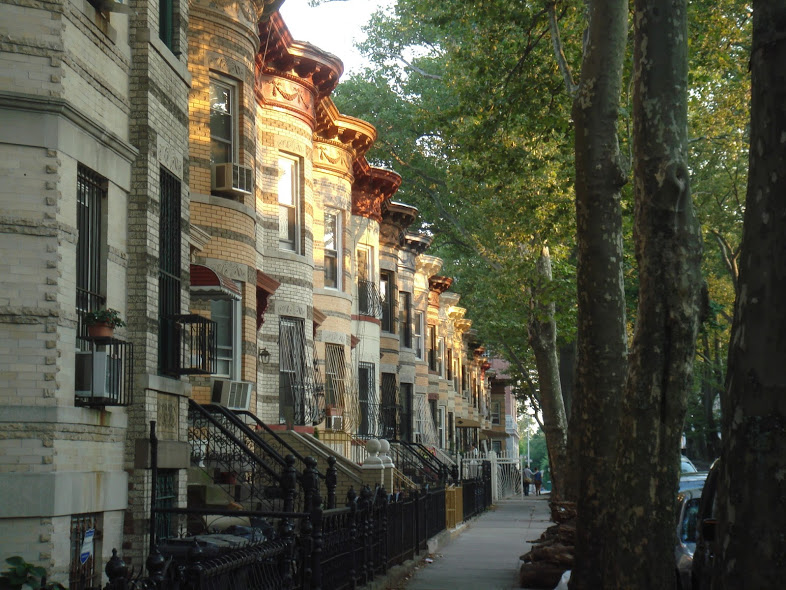
Row houses in Bushwick, Brooklyn.

As New York City grew, it spread outward from where it originally began at the southern tip of Manhattan Island into surrounding areas. In order to house the burgeoning population, farm land and open space in Upper Manhattan, the Bronx, Queens, Brooklyn, and Staten Island were developed into neighborhoods of brownstones, apartment buildings, multi-family and single-family homes. The density of this new construction generally depended on the area's proximity and accessibility to Manhattan.

The development of these areas was often spurred by the opening of bridges and the connection of boroughs via public transportation. For example, the Brooklyn Bridge was completed in 1883 and connects Brooklyn and Manhattan across the East River. Brooklyn Heights, a nabe on the Brooklyn waterfront, is often credited as the United States' first suburb. The bridge allowed an easier commute between Brooklyn and Manhattan and spurred rapid construction, development, and redevelopment. The Verrazano-Narrows Bridge, completed in 1964, opened up many areas of Staten Island to residential and commercial development, especially in the central and southern parts of the borough, which had previously been largely undeveloped. Staten Island's population doubled from about 221,000 in 1960 to about 443,000 in 2000.

By 1870, stone and brick had become firmly established as the building materials of choice, as the construction of wood-frame houses had been greatly limited in the aftermath of the Great Fire of 1835. Unlike Paris, which for centuries was built from its own limestone bedrock, New York has always drawn its building stone from a network of quarries, sometimes quite distant, which is evident in the variety of textures and hues of stone seen in the city's buildings. In the days before rail, stones were floated down the Hudson River or along the Atlantic Seaboard from pits in New England. While trains brought marble from Vermont and granite from Minnesota, it was Connecticut brownstone that was so popular in the construction of New York's row homes in the late 19th century that the term brownstone became synonymous with row house.

Beginning in the 1950s, public housing projects dramatically changed the city's appearance. New, large scale (frequently high-rise) residential complexes replaced older communities, at times removing artifacts and landmarks that would now be considered of historic value. During this period, many of these new projects were built in an effort towards urban renewal championed by the famed urban planner Robert Moses. The resulting housing projects have suffered from inconsistent funding, poor maintenance, and high crime, prompting many to consider these projects a failure.

A distinctive feature of residential (and many commercial) buildings in New York City is the presence of wooden roof-mounted water towers, which were required on all buildings higher than six stories by city ordinance in the 19th century because the municipal water pipes could not withstand the extraordinarily high pressure necessary to deliver water to the top stories of high-rise buildings.

== Bridges and tunnels ==
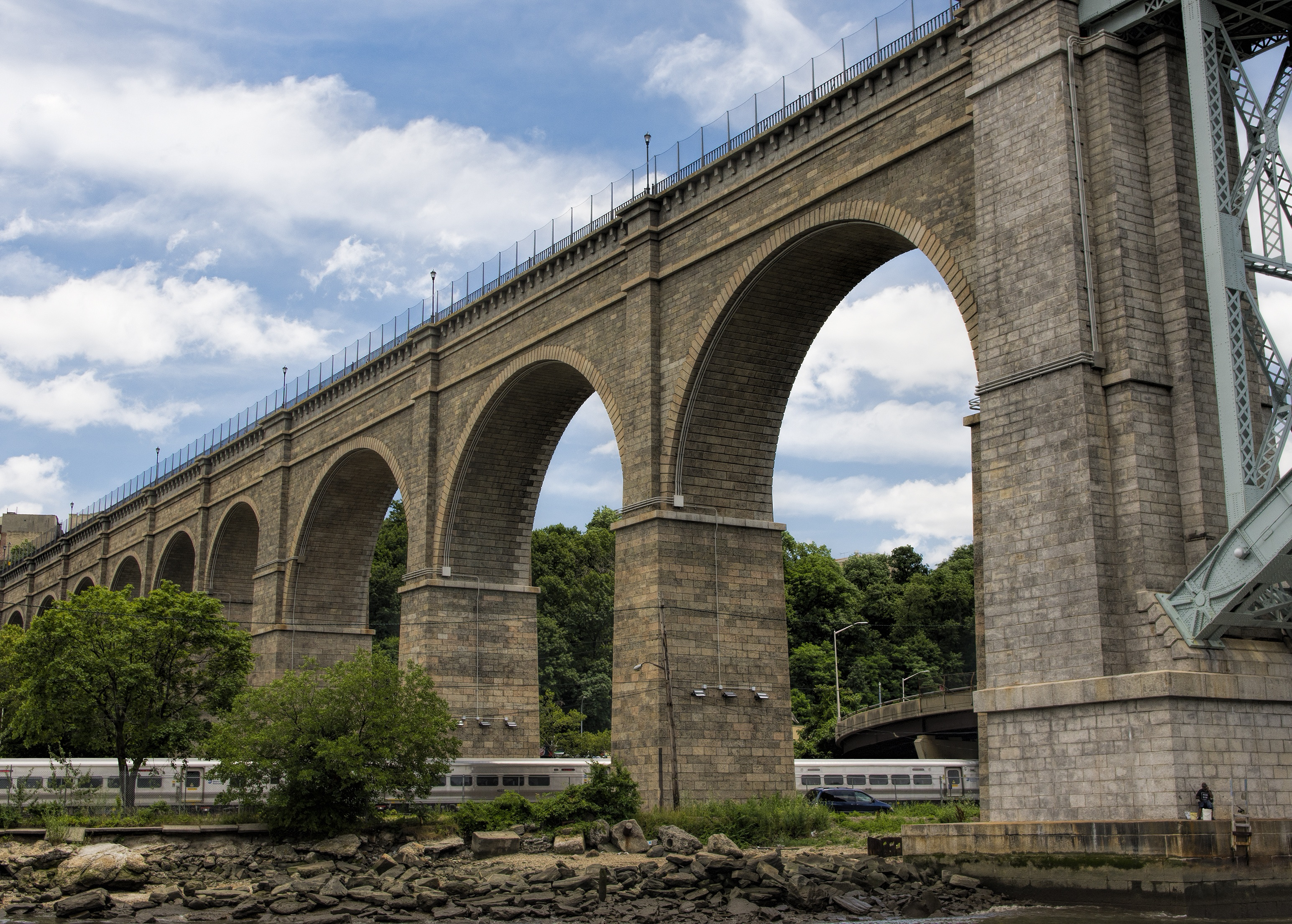
High Bridge (1848)

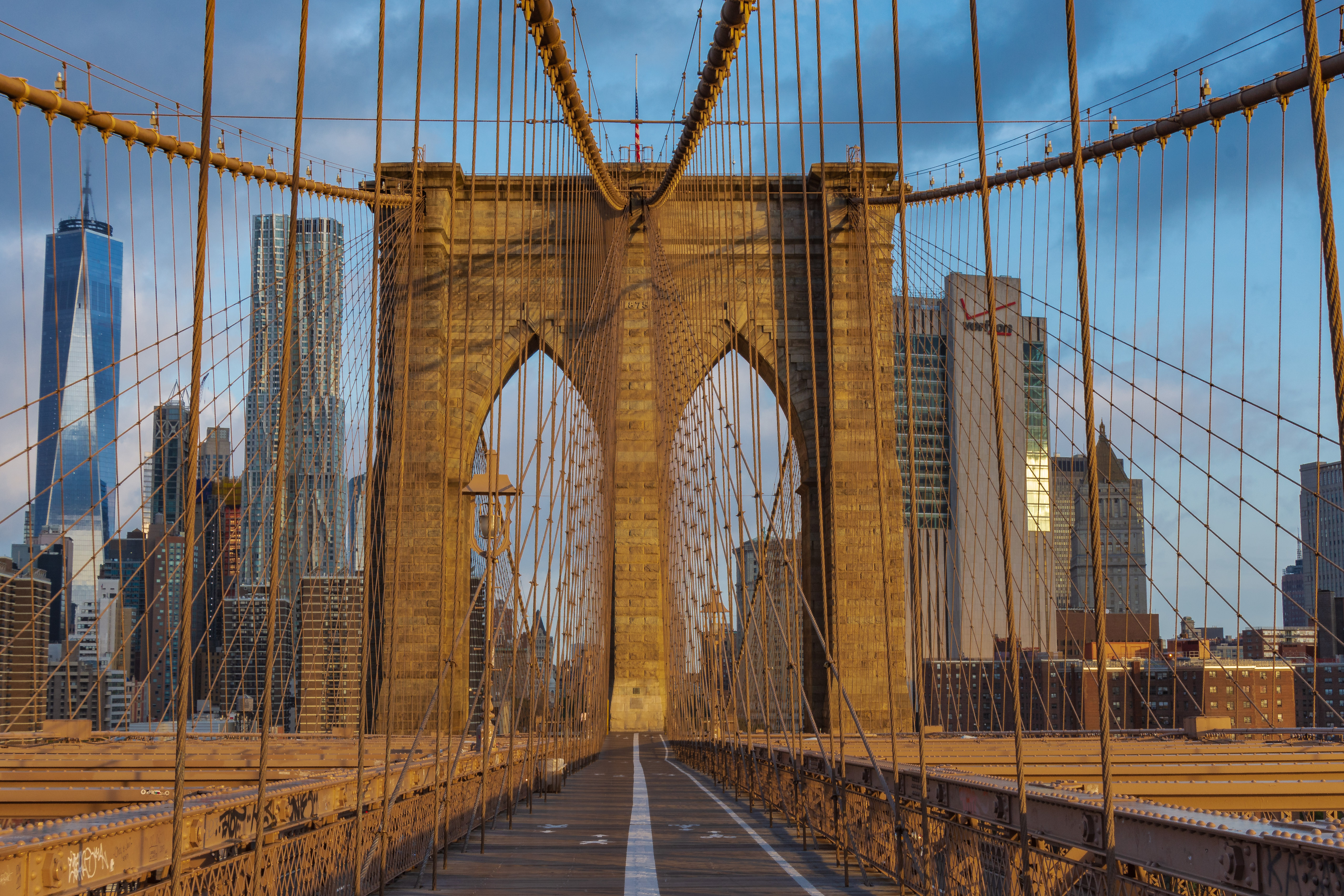
Brooklyn Bridge (1883)

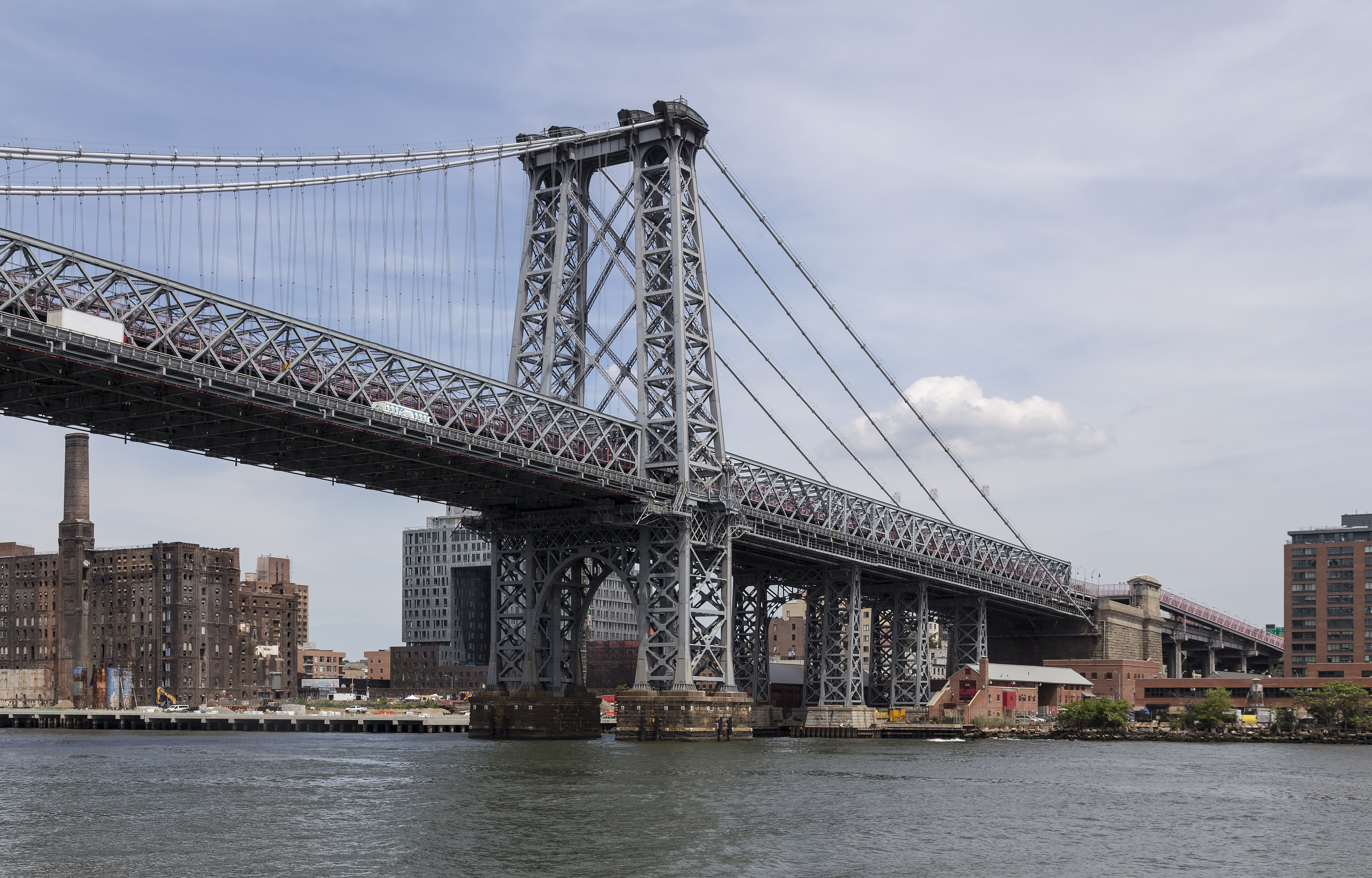
Williamsburg Bridge (1903)

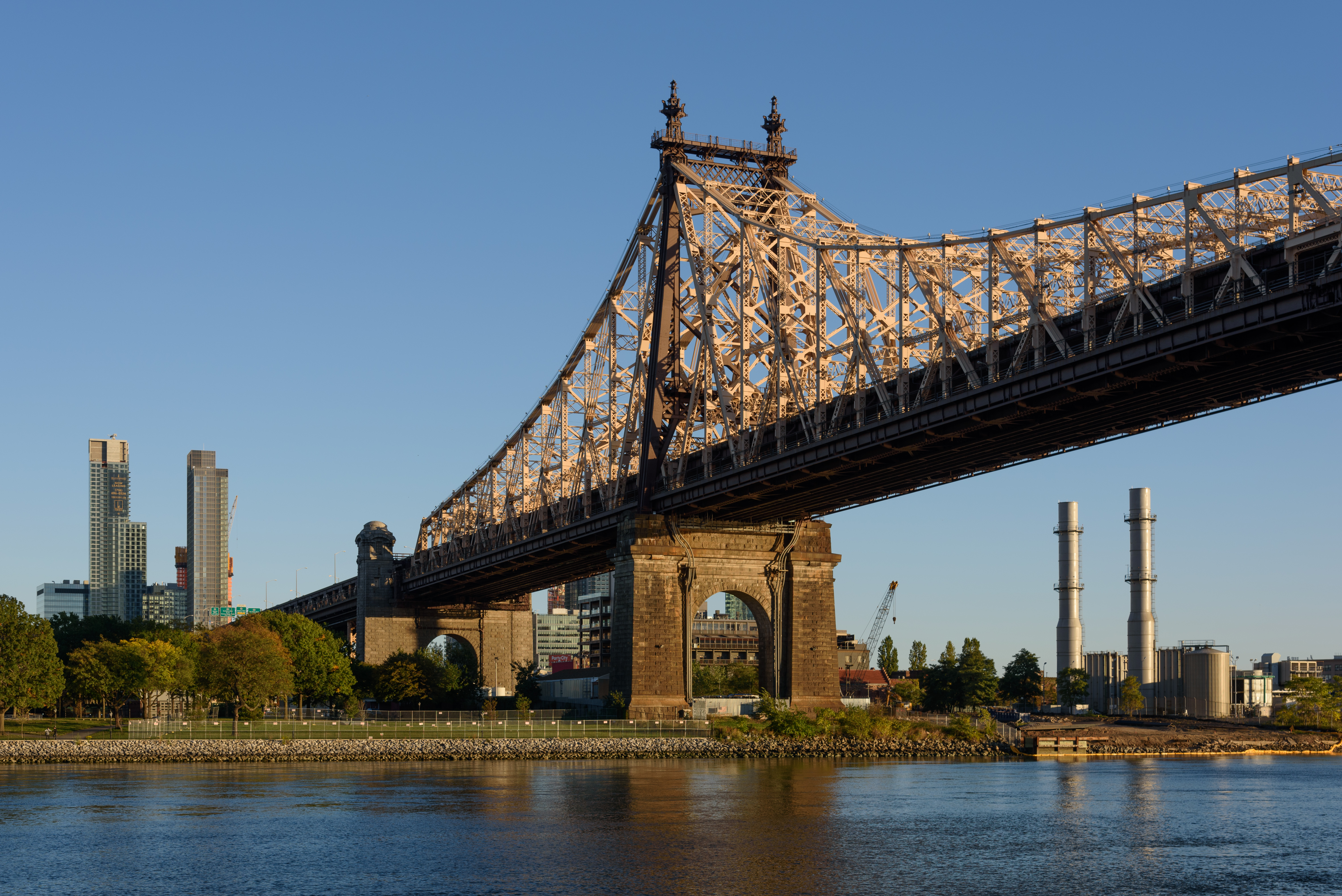
Queensboro Bridge (1909)

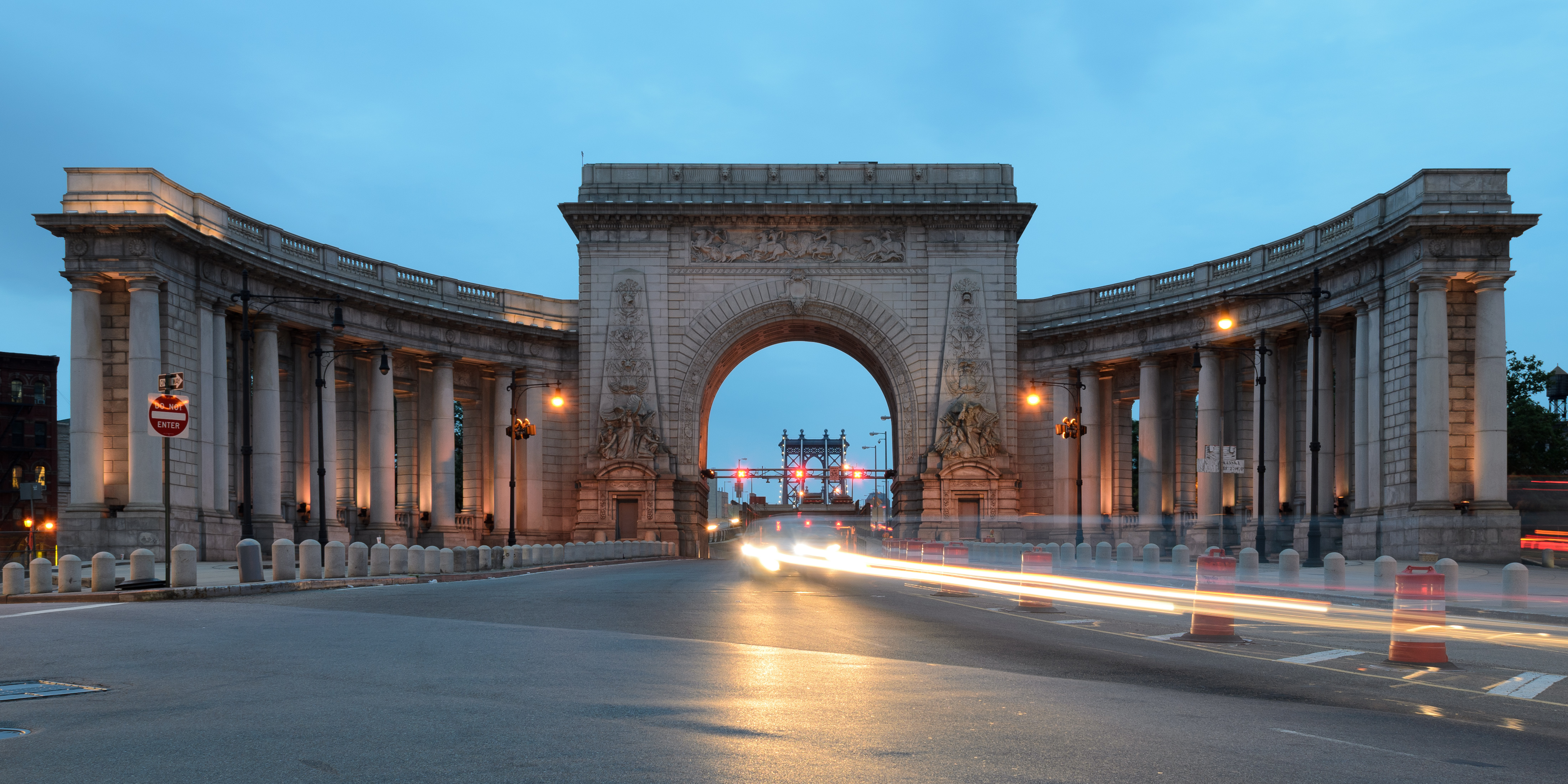
Manhattan Bridge (1909)

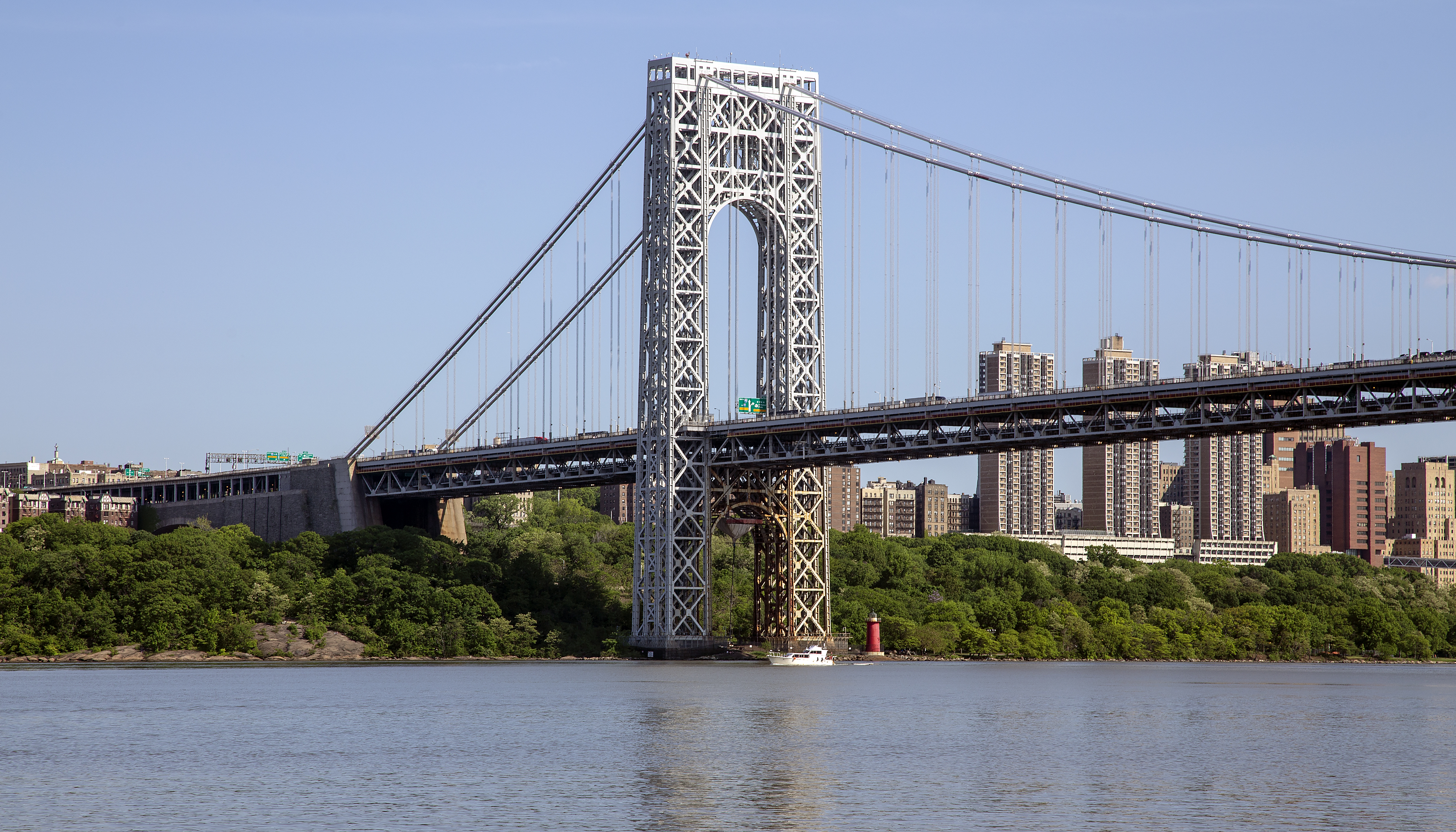
George Washington Bridge (1931)

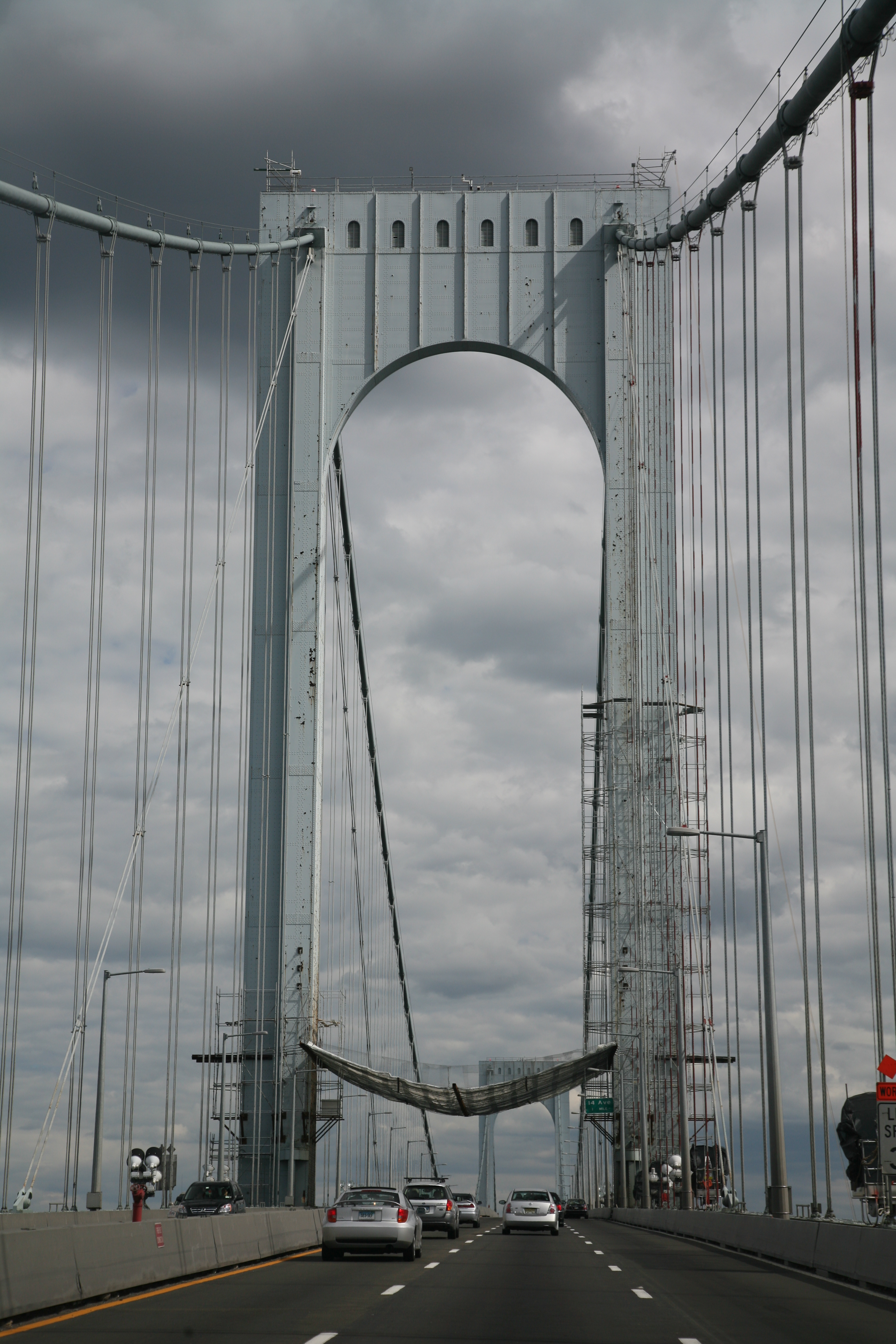
Whitestone Bridge (1939)

New York City is located on one of the world's largest natural harbors. The boroughs of Manhattan and Staten Island are their own islands, while Queens and Brooklyn are located at the west-end of the larger Long Island. This precipitates a need for an extensive infrastructure of bridges and tunnels. Nearly all of the city's major bridges and several of its tunnels, have broken or set records. For example, the Holland Tunnel was the world's first vehicular tunnel when it opened in 1927.

The Queensboro Bridge is an important piece of cantilever architecture. The towers of the Brooklyn Bridge are built of limestone, granite, and Rosendale cement; their architectural style is neo-Gothic, with characteristic pointed arches above the passageways through the stone towers. This bridge was also the longest suspension bridge in the world from its opening until 1903, and the first steel-wire suspension bridge. The Manhattan Bridge, Throgs Neck Bridge, Triborough Bridge, and Verrazzano–Narrows Bridge are all examples of Structural Expressionism.

== Street grid ==
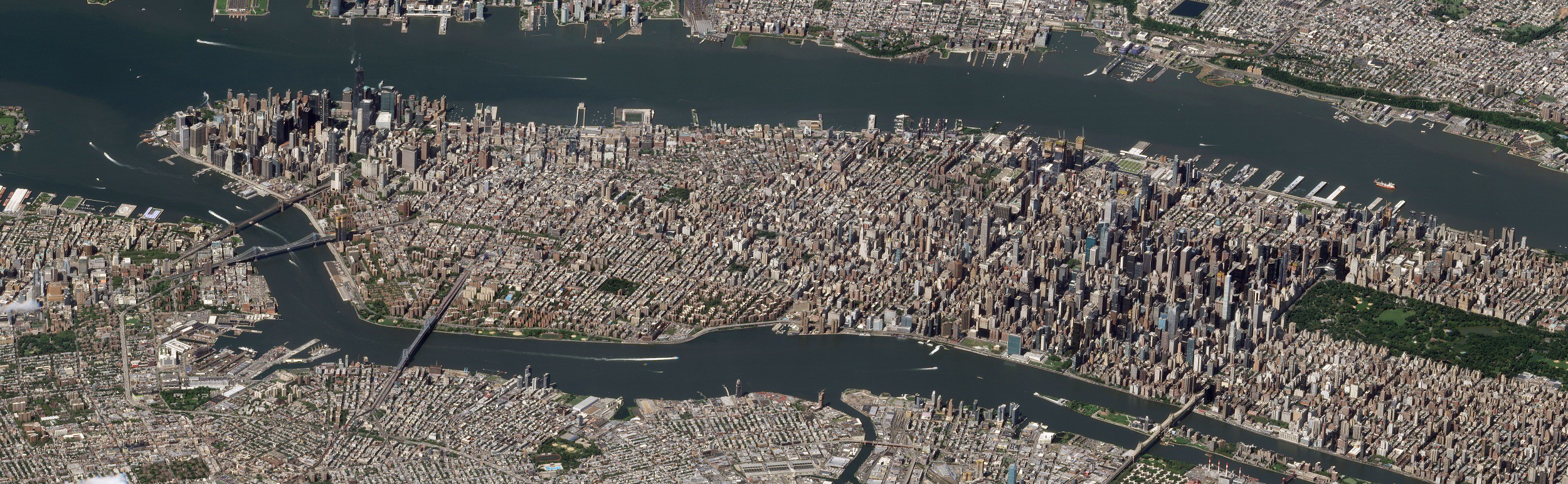
A satellite view of a portion of Manhattan

Formulated in the Commissioners' Plan of 1811, New York adopted a visionary proposal to develop Manhattan north of 14th Street with a regular street grid. The economic logic underlying the plan, which called for twelve numbered avenues running north and south, and 155 orthogonal cross streets, was that the grid's regularity would provide an efficient means to develop new real estate property. Frederick Law Olmsted, the designer of Central Park, disapproved.

== See also ==
- List of buildings
- List of National Historic Landmarks in New York
- List of New York City Designated Landmarks
- List of tallest buildings in New York City
- List of cities with most skyscrapers
- Art Deco architecture of New York City
