= Old Brooklyn Fire Headquarters =

Building in Brooklyn, New York

- The building seen in 2026
- Interactive map of the Old Brooklyn Fire Headquarters area

General information
- Type: Originally a fire station, now residential apartments
- Architectural style: Richardsonian Romanesque
- Location: 365–367 Jay Street; Brooklyn, New York City

Design and construction
- Architect: Frank Freeman

References
- Old Brooklyn Fire Headquarters
- U.S. National Register of Historic Places
- New York State Register of Historic Places
- New York City Landmark
- Coordinates: 40°41′34″N 73°59′13″W
- Built: 1892
- NRHP reference No.: 72000854
- NYSRHP No.: 04701.000106

Significant dates
- Added to NRHP: January 20, 1972
- Designated NYSRHP: June 23, 1980
- Designated NYCL: April 19, 1966

The Old Brooklyn Fire Headquarters is a historic building located at 365–367 Jay Street near Willoughby Street in Downtown Brooklyn, New York City. Designed by Frank Freeman in the Richardsonian Romanesque Revival style and built in 1892 for the Brooklyn Fire Department, it was used as a fire station until the 1970s, after which it was converted into residential apartments. The building, described as "one of New York's best and most striking architectural compositions", was made a New York City landmark in 1966, and listed on the National Register of Historic Places in 1972.

== Architecture ==
The building was designed by Frank Freeman, who frequently designed structures in the Richardsonian Romanesque style. The firehouse consists of a five-story main building with a basement, as well as an adjacent seven-story watchtower that rises 126 feet (38 m). Both structures are rectangular in plan. The entire structure has a 50-foot (15 m) wide frontage on the east side of Jay Street and a depth of 100 feet (30 m). By the 1990s, the Old Brooklyn Fire Headquarters was one of a small number of structures designed by Freeman that remained intact. The building's design is an example of the New York branch of the Chicago architectural school.

=== Facade ===
The street-level facade is largely made of red Jonesboro granite, trimmed with red Lake Superior sandstone. On the ground floor is a recessed 16-foot-tall (4.9 m) arch with a garage door through which the fire engines once drove. The arch was decorated with floral ornament, and a sign with the words "Fire Headquarters" was hung above the arch. The public entrance, to the left of the garage door, was composed of oak doors that opened into the lobby. These doors were flanked by granite columns with granite capitals, which supported a flat-arched lintel. The rest of the ground story is clad in granite and sandstone up to the sills beneath the second-story windows.

On the upper stories, the Jay Street elevation of the facade is divided vertically into three bays and have a buff-brick facade with terracotta trim. The leftmost bay includes the watchtower and contains two narrow windows on each of the second through fifth floors. Each of the windows is a sash window with a horizontal transom, which separates a smaller pane above and a larger pane below. The two bays on the right side comprise the main building and originally included one wide window on each of the second through fourth floors. The rightmost bays are flanked by pilasters, which are made of Pompeian brick and have a trefoil cross-section. In all three bays, the windows have plain sandstone sills. A recessed arch is on the left side of the building, high in the tower; this arch was intended to contain a clock face. The side elevations of the facade are clad in plain brick.

Both the main building and the watchtower contain red-tiled pyramidal roofs trimmed with copper. There is a dormer window in the main building's roof at the sixth story. The main building and watchtower are separated by a slender, semicircular turret with a conical roof which rises the full height of the building. Two similar turrets, one on the outer edge of each wing, complement the central turret. Each of the turrets measures 4.5 feet (1.4 m) in diameter and is topped by a terracotta finial. There are decorative studs above the tower arch and cylindrical holes around the tops of the turrets. The top of the watchtower, rising 40 feet (12 m) above the roof of the main building, was originally topped by a flagpole, above which was a huge gilded eagle with outstretched wings.

=== Interior ===
The basement had a concrete floor and contained various pieces of mechanical equipment, including an elevator room, boilers, and pumps. Telephone lines, telegraph lines, and signal wires entered the building through the basement. At ground level, the watchtower's main entrance led into a tiled vestibule and hallway; it had heavy oak doorways of antique finish. The ground story also had garages with space for motor vehicles and stables for horses. Part of the rear of the ground floor was divided into stalls. The stables and garages had a concrete floor, as well as enameled brick walls.

The second and third floors were devoted to offices, record rooms, and storage rooms. The front of the second floor had three offices, one each for the commissioner, the deputy commissioner, and the department's chief engineer. In the rear were administrative offices and a bathroom, as well as a safekeeping vault measuring 10 by 10 feet (3.0 by 3.0 m). The third floor contained the archives room, supply rooms, and the quarters and offices of the department's Superintendent of Supplies. Behind these rooms was a small court with a trial room and a jury room, which heard cases against firefighters who had violated regulations. The fourth floor was intended for training firefighters. The fifth floor was given over to the telegraph alarm system, battery rooms, storage rooms, and the offices of the telegraph superintendent's team. The front portion of the watchtower contained the telegraph superintendent's office, while the front of the main structure contained the operating room and a linemen's room. The battery room, measuring 36 by 44 feet (11 by 13 m), was in the rear.

All stories, except the ground floor, contained wood finishes, mainly old oak. In addition, the floors and walls of the offices were tiled. Polished-bronze hardware was used throughout the building, except at the main entrance. The building had a quartered-oak staircase, as well as an elevator directly behind it. The original elevator had wrought iron doors and was still in use in the 2010s.

== History ==
=== Fire station ===
==== Development ====
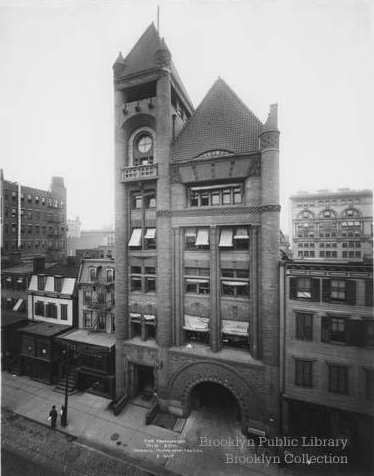
The Brooklyn Fire Headquarters as seen c. 1910

The Brooklyn Fire Department, which served the then-independent city of Brooklyn, New York, during the 19th century, had outgrown its old headquarters in Downtown Brooklyn by the late 1880s. This prompted the department to begin planning a new fire headquarters with a tall lookout tower. At the time, Engine Company 17, a volunteer company of the Brooklyn Fire Department, had a firehouse on Jay Street in Downtown Brooklyn. In November 1890, Brooklyn mayor Alfred C. Chapin agreed to buy a plot of land at 365 Jay Street, adjacent to the quarters of Engine Company 17, from local Democratic Party leader Hugh "Boss" McLaughlin for $15,000. Initially, city works commissioner John P. Adams was only willing to provide $80,000 for the construction of the fire headquarters. The city's Commission on Small Sites passed a resolution in January 1891, authorizing Brooklyn fire commissioner John Ennis to host an architectural design competition for a five-story structure costing up to $100,000.

Ennis invited several local architects in February 1891 to submit designs for the building. Two of the invited architects, George Ingram and J. C. Cody & Co., declined to participate in the competition. The other architects submitted designs in multiple architectural styles, including the Romanesque and 15th-century French Renaissance styles. At this point, a dispute arose as to the choice of architect. Ennis favored a protege of McLaughlin, but Adams preferred another firm. Eventually, Frank Freeman, who had recently completed the Thomas Jefferson Association Building for the Kings County Democrats, was selected. The Commission on Small Sites approved Freeman's plans for a buff brick, stone, and terracotta fire station on March 23, 1891; the same month, the fire department awarded a contract for the replacement for its telegraph apparatus, which was in the old firehouse. The Brooklyn Daily Eagle published a sketch of Freeman's design that June. The fire department temporarily relocated to Lawrence Street while the old firehouse was razed and replaced. By July 1892, the exterior work had been completed, and contractors were installing finishes on the interior.

==== Opening and use ====
The new building was completed in late 1892 at a total cost of $150,000, but it was not occupied for another year. Even before the headquarters officially opened, Brooklyn officials had looked into the high costs of the building's telegraph system as part of a wider investigation of corruption in the Brooklyn Fire Department. The fire department finally began moving into the building on March 15, 1894. Though originally intended as the Brooklyn Fire Department's headquarters, the building only served as such until 1898. After the City of Brooklyn became a borough of the City of Greater New York in 1898, the building became "simply, the most splendid neighborhood firehouse in Greater New York", as Francis Morrone and James Iska described it.

The building was retained as a firehouse by the New York City Fire Department (FDNY) until the 1970s, serving as the home of various units including Ladder 110 and 118, Engine 207, and from 1947 to 1971, Battalion 31. FDNY's Rescue 2 unit, which saved members of other units during severe emergencies, occupied the building from 1929 to 1946. During the 1930s, it also served as the headquarters of Searchlight 2, a unit which utilized a Packard sedan modified to carry searchlights, in an era before fire engines were fitted with their own searchlights. In 1966, the building was designated as a New York City landmark, and in 1972 it was listed on the National Register of Historic Places. The FDNY had moved out of the building by 1972, and it opened a new headquarters nearby in 1981.

=== Sale and Poly Tech use ===
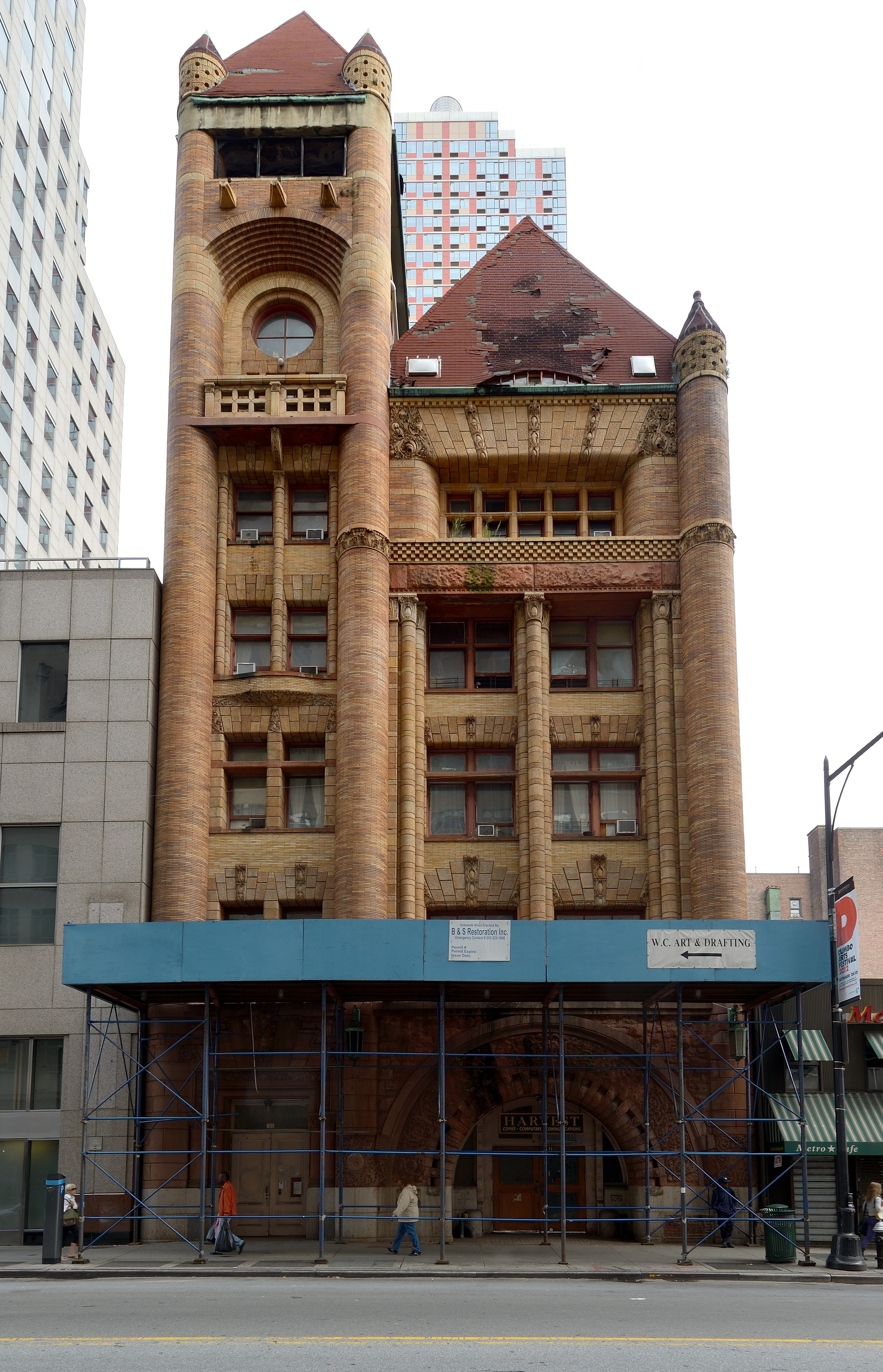
The building in 2012

After the FDNY vacated the premises, the city government held an auction the building in January 1975, in which only nonprofit educational institutions were allowed to bid. City officials had expected to sell the firehouse to Poly Tech, which had bid $15,000. New York state legislator Vito P. Battista ultimately submitted a high bid of $55,000; he planned to relocate his Institute of Design and Construction to the building. The city government, which had wanted to sell the building to Poly Tech, refused to accept any money from Battista other than his $11,000 down payment. The New York City Board of Estimate had planned to nullify the sale but delayed its plans to do so after Battista threatened to sue in April 1975.

By 1976, the city had taken back the building and leased it to Poly Tech for 50 years for a nominal fee. At the time, the building was to be renovated into a fire safety research center for Poly Tech, with laboratories. The building remained empty for several years. Poly Tech announced in January 1980 that it would renovate the building after raising $750,000 for the project. Most of the funds came from grants, which included $50,000 from the New York State Department of Parks, Recreation and Historic Preservation, $245,000 from the Fleischmann Foundation, $450,000 from the United States Department of Housing and Urban Development. Several contractors submitted bids for the project, and the FDNY began reviewing bids in early 1981. Poly Tech had moved out by 1986.

=== Conversion to housing ===
MetroTech Center, a commercial and educational complex, was developed next to the Brooklyn Fire Headquarters in the late 1980s, requiring 150 low-income or elderly residents to relocate. In July 1987, the Board of Estimate approved the complex's construction in July 1987 on the condition that the developers add 46 apartments for low-income and elderly people to MetroTech Center; the city planned to provide 18 apartments in the Brooklyn Fire Headquarters. This would allow some of the displaced residents to live near the former sites of their homes. At the time, the firehouse's facade was extremely dilapidated. Supporters of the conversion project said it would provide funding for the building's restoration while adding much-needed affordable housing units, while opponents said the project would destroy the building's architectural integrity. The Board of Estimate had overruled opponents' concerns by late 1987, mandating that the building be converted to residential uses. The conversion was to be funded by MetroTech's developer, Forest City. Priority for units in the Brooklyn Fire Headquarters was given to residents of a city block that was being razed to make way for the Securities Industry Automation Corporation's headquarters.

The conversion began in 1989, partly on the grounds that continued use would prevent the building from falling into decay. The Black United Fund of New York took over the building from the 1990s until 2005, when ownership returned to the New York City Department of Housing Preservation and Development. Under city ownership, the deterioration continued; in 2006, the New York Times said that the building had a "musty, neglected air" and was in need of maintenance, with parts of its roofing having disintegrated. The facade as a whole had become dirty and deteriorated over the years.

In 2008, nonprofit organization Pratt Area Community Council (PACC) was given $400,000 to renovate the Jay Street firehouse. The project was announced in 2010 but was postponed several times because of objections from the New York City Department of Housing Preservation and Development. Nomad Architecture was hired to renovate the building. PACC bought the building in 2013 for a nominal fee of $1, and work began that August. At the time, twelve of the building's residents had lived there for two decades. The building suffered from rat infestations and had a deteriorated roof, as well as non-functioning elevator and heat service. As part of the project, PACC worked with developer MDG Design + Construction to restore the facade to its original design, as well as to replace the elevator. In addition, a deteriorated vault under the sidewalk, above the New York City Subway's Jay Street–MetroTech station, was fixed. The facade renovation had been completed by November 2014, and the entire project was finished in 2015.

== Reception ==
The Landmarks Preservation Commission's designation report described it as "one of New York's best and most striking architectural compositions" and "one of the finest buildings in Brooklyn." Architecture critic Francis Morrone has characterized it as "simply, the most splendid neighborhood firehouse in Greater New York", while architect Norval White wrote in the AIA Guide to New York City that "this is a building to write home about. A powerful Romanesque Revival brick, granite and tile structure." Paul Goldberger wrote in 1986: "It is too derivative to be called truly original, but it is no less wonderful for that – this noble building seems to reach out and give us a bear hug, reminding us that public architecture can be both monumental and friendly." The design has also been characterized in The New York Times as "exuberant and lusty". According to Christopher Gray of The New York Times, the building was "a heroic masterpiece of the Romanesque Revival". When Gray critiqued the building in 2006, he wrote that it had been overshadowed by an adjacent civic skyscraper that was developed in the 1950s.

Critics also praised specific parts of the design. Goldberger wrote that the building "is strong and sensual; its deep arch and rounded columns suggest that Freeman knew civic power and civic graciousness need not be incompatible." Morrone wrote that the building's entrance was "one of the boldest and most mellifluously carved arches" in Brooklyn. According to the LPC, the overall color scheme was "both subtle and ingenious."

== See also ==
- List of New York City Designated Landmarks in Brooklyn
- National Register of Historic Places listings in Brooklyn
