= Germania Club House =

Coordinates: 40.69030°N 73.99440°W

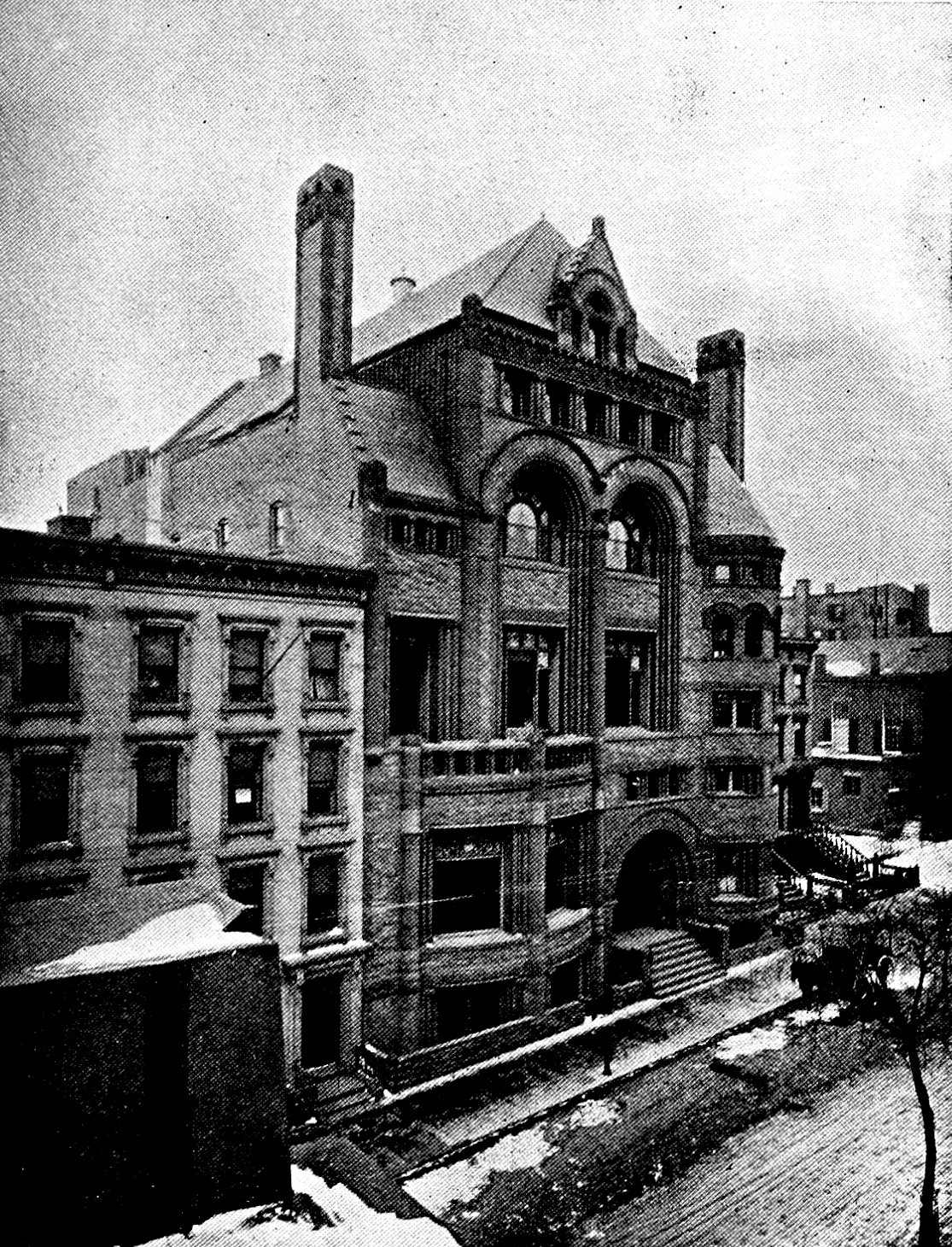
- Interactive map of the Germania Club House area

General information
- Type: Recreational
- Architectural style: Richardsonian Romanesque
- Location: 120 Schermerhorn St., Brooklyn
- Construction started: Early 1890
- Completed: October 1890
- Demolished: 1920s
- Cost: $140,000

Height
- Height: Four stories

Dimensions
- Other dimensions: 60 by 100 feet

Design and construction
- Architect: Frank Freeman

The Germania Club House was a building located in Boerum Hill, Brooklyn, New York. Designed by Frank Freeman and completed in 1890, it was considered one of Brooklyn's finest examples of Romanesque Revival architecture. It was demolished in the 1920s to make way for a subway.

== History ==
The Germania Club of Brooklyn was first organized in 1859. Its original clubhouse was located on the northwest corner of Clinton St. and Atlantic Avenue, Brooklyn. In 1865 the club moved to 164 Atlantic Avenue.

By 1888, the club's prosperity and membership had increased to such an extent that the board decided to raise funds for the construction of an entirely new clubhouse, expressly designed to accommodate the club's diversity of activities. The architect chosen to design the new building was prominent Brooklyn architect Frank Freeman. Freeman may have been favored for the commission due to his design, completed in 1889, of the acclaimed private residence for Herman Behr, the Germania Club's President. The initial cost of the new clubhouse was estimated at $80,000.

Construction of the clubhouse, at 120 Schermerhorn St., between Smith St. and Boerum Place, began in 1890 and was completed in October of the same year. The final cost of the building, including the furnishings, was $140,000. The "spacious and handsome" new clubhouse quickly became a favorite venue for the fashion set, with many society balls and dances held there.

In the 1920s, much of Schermerhorn Street, including the architectural "treasure" of the Germania Club House, was demolished to make way for the New York City Subway's IND Fulton Street Line (now the A and C trains).

== Description ==
In its time, the Germania Club House was described as "unsurpassed ... [a]s a specimen of Romanesque architecture ... by any other structure in Brooklyn". The Eagle and Brooklyn described the building in the following terms:

It is four stories in height, built of light colored brick, terra cotta and brownstone. The front on Schermerhorn street is ninety feet in width. The basement is built of rough hewn brownstone. A flight of stone steps, converging towards the top, leads to a wide arched doorway, supported by four finely carved pillars of red sandstone, with Corinthian foliage and floral designs in terra cotta. To the right of the entrance the building is flanked by a huge circular tower, rising from the basement to a point just above the fourth story, where it terminates in a conical roof. There are four rows of arched and mullioned windows in the tower, with panes of bent glass.

On the opposite side of the building, between the first and second stories, a wide bay window projects outward for some distance, its roof forming a balcony of considerable dimensions, enclosed by rails of dark brownstone. The features of this window are two panes of bent glass, eight by ten feet in size, which are said to be the largest of their kind in the country. Above the arch of the doorway four pilasters, faced with terra cotta flower and basket work, and capped with elaborately carved brownstone copings, extend to the height of the building, terminating at either corner of the gable. At every suitable space on the front of the club house there is an abundance of delicated carvings and moulding, while each of the windows is supported on sheaves of slender columns, crowned with richly foliated capitals.

The entrance led through two "massively panelled" oak doors to a vestibule, thence a hallway leading to "a wide staircase, with newels and balustrades of white oak." To the left of the hallway was the main reception room, 100 by 40 feet, with a vaulted ceiling upheld by two rows of "massive" Corinthian columns. To the right of the hall was a ladies' reception room, reading rooms and library, and servants' apartments. A mezzanine floor between the first and second floors contained "a large reading room, private apartments for dinner parties, hat and cloak rooms and a café."

The second floor was occupied principally by the grand dining hall, decorated with "panelled wainscoting of white oak and a high vaulted ceiling with groined arches." Running the entire length of one side of the building, it was designed to seat up to 600. The remainder of the floor was occupied by employees' apartments. A second mezzanine floor on this level contained the superintendent's office, along with a number of cloakrooms, dressing rooms and bathrooms. The third floor incorporated "ladies' parlors, waiting and toilet rooms" and a large kitchen.

The fourth (top) floor housed a ballroom/theater, with an auditorium 100 by 64 feet in size, and capable of seating up to 1000, including 250 in a horseshoe gallery that ran around all four walls. A stage, 60 feet wide by 28 feet deep, occupied one end of the floor, along with green rooms and dressing rooms.

The basement of the building was installed with bowling alleys, and probably also contained the Club's billiard rooms and other sports facilities.

== Bibliography ==
- Howard, Henry Ward Beecher; Jervis, Arthur N. (1893): The Eagle and Brooklyn: The Record of the Progress of the Brooklyn Daily Eagle, Volume 2, The Brooklyn Daily Eagle.
- Morrone, Francis; Iska, James (2001): An Architectural Guidebook to Brooklyn, Gibbs Smith, ISBN 978-1-58685-047-0.
