= Brooklyn Fire Department =

Former fire department of Brooklyn, New York

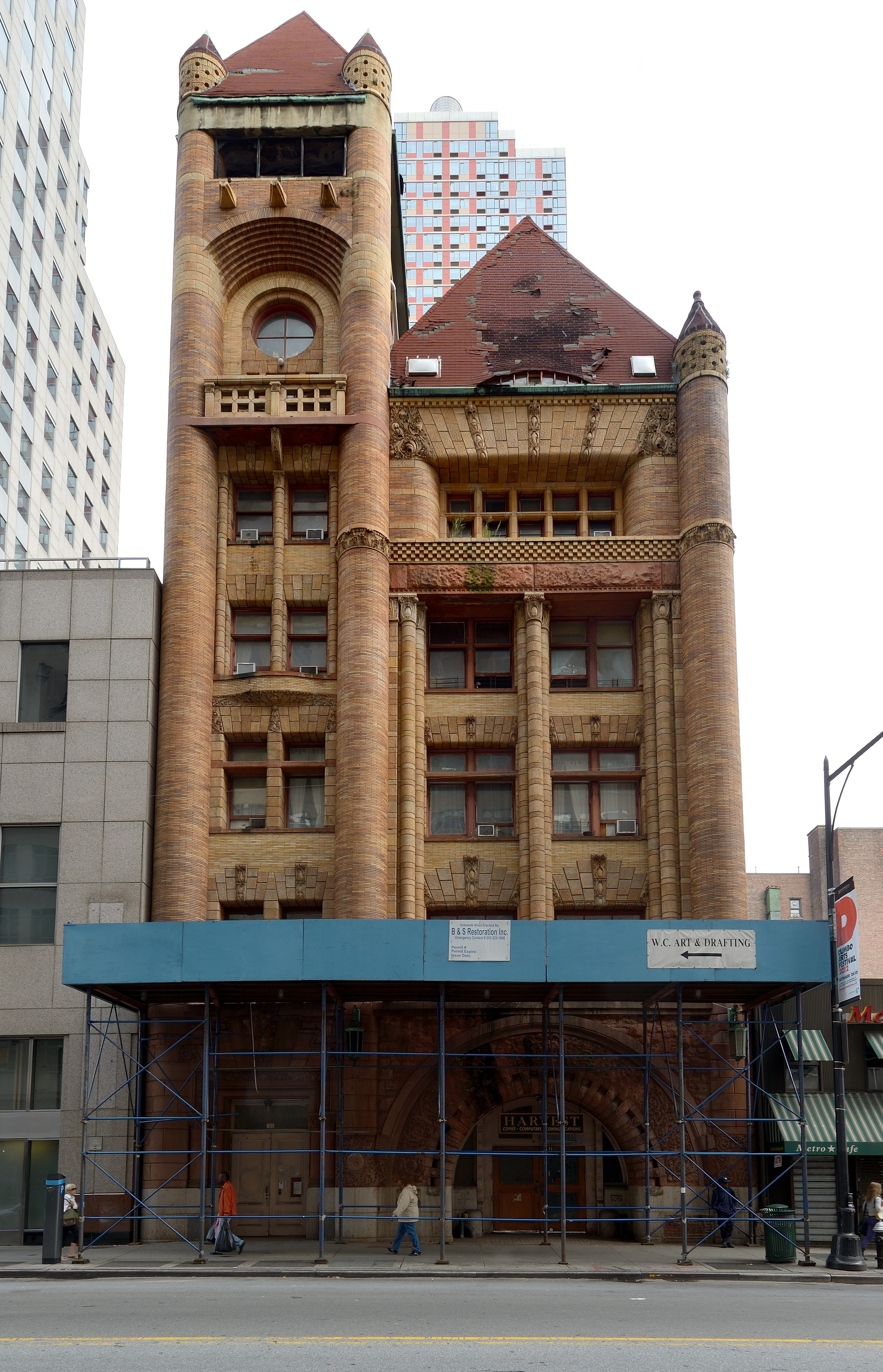
Old Brooklyn Fire Headquarters, headquarters of the Brooklyn Fire Department from 1894 to 1898

The Brooklyn Fire Department (BFD) was a professional fire department that provided fire protection and rescue services to the city of Brooklyn, New York, within modern-day New York City, from 1869 to 1898. The Brooklyn Fire Department, a paid firefighting force, replaced a 3,000-person volunteer fire department that was poorly equipped to serve Brooklyn's growing population.

The Brooklyn Fire Department consisted of 13 engine companies and 6 ladder companies, as well as two fire boats. A headquarters building was built in Downtown Brooklyn in 1894. and several firehouses were built in the mid-1890s when Brooklyn annexed several smaller towns. The Brooklyn Fire Department was subsumed into the New York City Fire Department (FDNY) in 1898, upon Brooklyn's consolidation with New York City.

== History ==
Initially, the city of Brooklyn was covered by several volunteer fire departments, mostly close to the shore of the East River, where there were relatively high land values that consequently warranted more extensive fire protections. The first such company was founded in 1785 in Brooklyn Heights, and consisted of an engineer and five firemen operating from a firehouse near Cadman Plaza. The volunteer force grew to 3,000 by the mid-19th century, and as the number of fires increased, so did the amount of losses. Since other cities in the U.S. would develop professional firefighting forces, several residents and insurance workers started advocating for such a force in the city of Brooklyn. A bill for the establishment of a paid fire department was introduced in the Brooklyn city council in 1858, though the bill was not passed.

In May 1869, another piece of legislation to create a professional, paid firefighting force was passed and signed by New York governor John T. Hoffman. The bill enabled the appointment of several fire commissioners, who in turn hired various staff and procured the BFD's apparatus. The Brooklyn Fire Department, a paid firefighting force, was organized on September 15, 1869, replacing the 3,000-person volunteer force. According to an official BFD history, the volunteer department had been made obsolete due to technological advances that rendered the volunteers unable to respond efficiently to fires.

Upon its organization, the Brooklyn Fire Department consisted of 13 engine companies and 6 ladder companies, though several new engine and ladder companies were added over the following years. By 1870, the cities of Brooklyn and Williamsburg had merged their volunteer fire departments with the BFD. Several other towns were annexed into Brooklyn in the 1880s and 1890s, namely Flatbush, Flatlands, Gravesend, and New Utrecht. As they were annexed, these municipalities merged their volunteer fire departments with the BFD. Under Fire Commissioner Frederick W. Wurster, the Brooklyn Fire Department built several new firehouses in the newly annexed areas in 1894.

After the 1898 consolidation of Brooklyn with the other four boroughs and creation of the modern City of New York, the companies and equipment of the Brooklyn and Long Island City Fire Departments were merged with the New York City Fire Department (FDNY) on January 28, 1898. The companies of the former Queens and Brooklyn fire departments were renumbered in 1913.

== Equipment ==
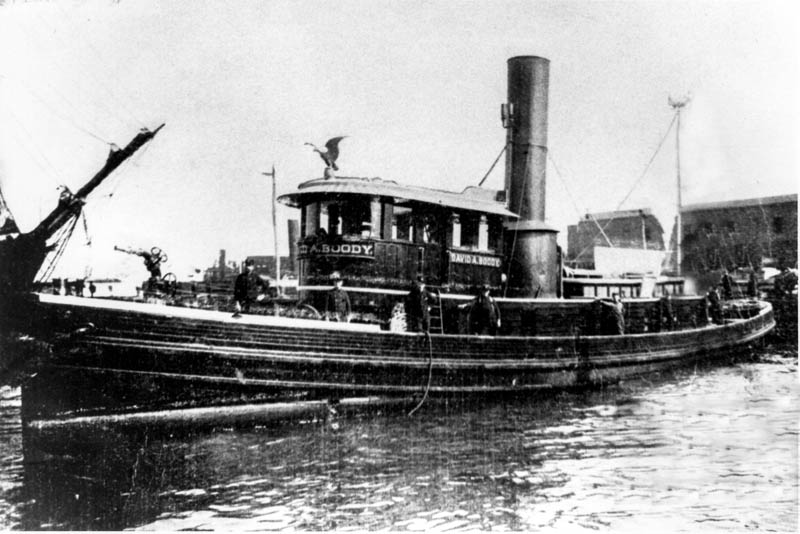
Brooklyn Fire Department fireboat David A. Boody

The department operated two fireboats, the Seth Low and David A. Boody. The Seth Low, named for Brooklyn mayor Seth Low, was a wooden-hull boat used by the BFD and then the FDNY from 1885 to 1917. The David A. Boody was built in 1892 and was used by the BFD and FDNY until her scrapping in 1916.

== Facilities ==
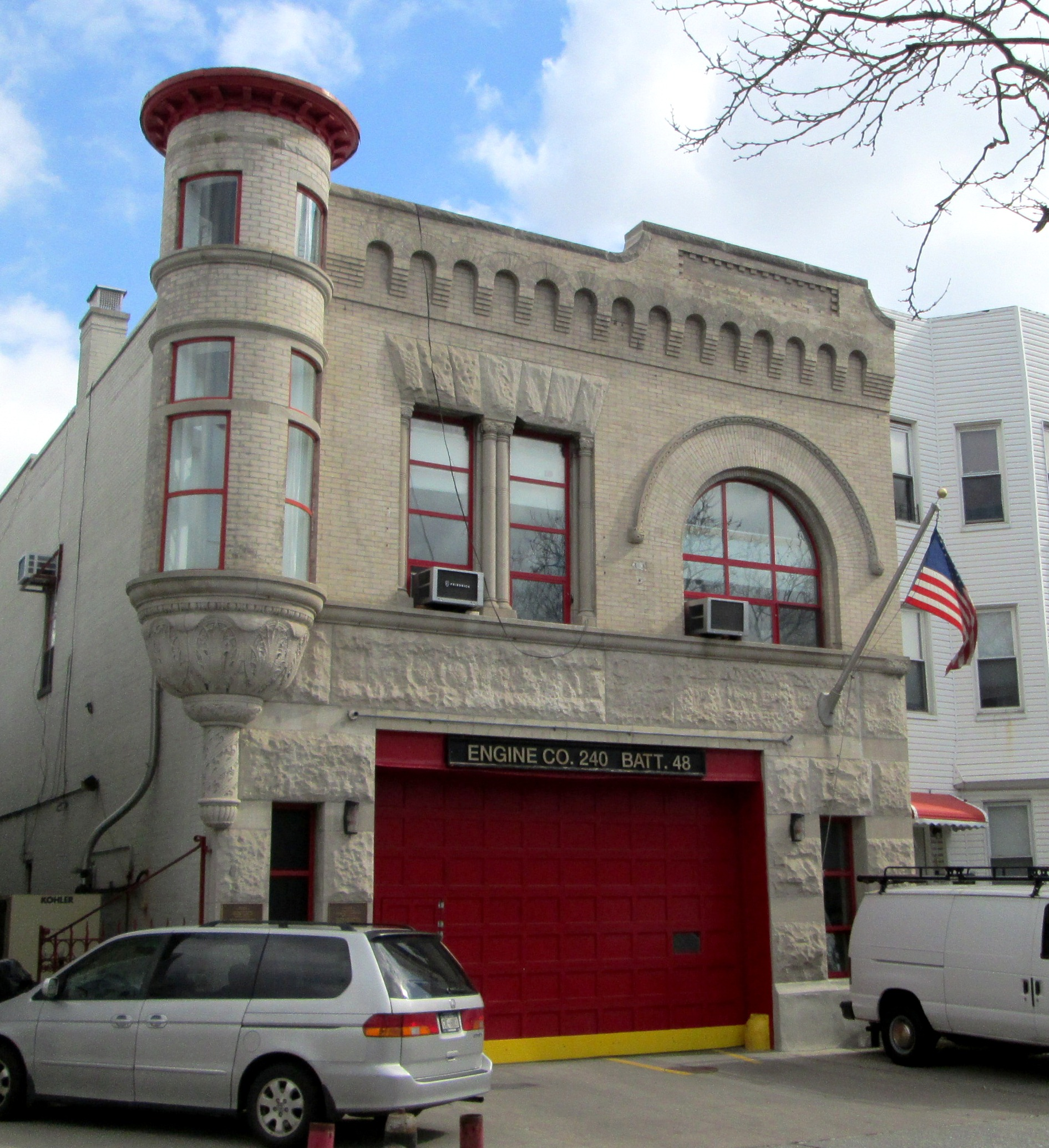
Former Brooklyn Fire Department firehouse, Windsor Terrace, Brooklyn

=== Headquarters ===
Around 1890, the Brooklyn Fire Department began planning for the construction of a new fire headquarters with a tall lookout tower. The BFD commissioned Frank Freeman to design the Brooklyn Fire Headquarters on Jay Street in Downtown Brooklyn. The new building was nearly completed in 1892, although the fire department did not occupy the building until March 1894. Though originally intended as the department's headquarters, it served in this role for only four years until the Brooklyn Fire Department was incorporated into the FDNY. The building was converted to residential use in 2015.

=== Fire houses and bell towers ===
Before the rise of the fire alarm system, the Brooklyn Fire Department had four bell towers from which firefighters could spot fires from afar. These were located at Brooklyn City Hall; the intersection of Hicks and Sackett Streets in Cobble Hill, south Brooklyn; the intersection of North First Street and Bedford Avenue in Williamsburg, north Brooklyn; and the intersection of Ten Eycke and Manhattan Avenue (formerly Ewen Street) in East Williamsburg, east Brooklyn. Only the City Hall tower was initially able to receive messages from the Brooklyn police department, but within a year of its foundation, lines were also run to North 1st Street and Hicks Street. These towers controlled the 14 districts in the city of Brooklyn.

The Brooklyn Fire Department also had a firehouse for each engine company. In 2013, two firehouses, Engine Company 240/Battalion 48 in Windsor Terrace and Engine Company 228 in Sunset Park, were made official city landmarks by the New York City Landmarks Preservation Commission; both of these remain active FDNY firehouses.
