= Saint Ann's School (Brooklyn) =

Independent day school in Brooklyn, New York City

Location
- The Bosworth Building; 129 Pierrepont St. Brooklyn, New York; United States; 40°41′42″N 73°59′32″W

Information
- Type: Independent, nonsectarian day school
- Motto: Latin: Altiora Peto (I seek higher things)
- Established: 1965; 61 years ago
- Founder: Stanley Bosworth
- Head of School: Kenyatte Reid
- Teaching staff: 164.4 (FTE) (2017–18)
- Grades: pre-K–12
- Enrollment: 1,031 (2017–18)
- Student to teacher ratio: 6.3:1 (2017–18)
- Campus type: Urban
- Colors: Blue; White; Gold
- Athletics: Saint Ann's Steamers
- Mascot: Owl on Athenian Coin
- Newspaper: Saint Ann's Ram; Saint Ann's Owl
- Website: www.saintannsny.org
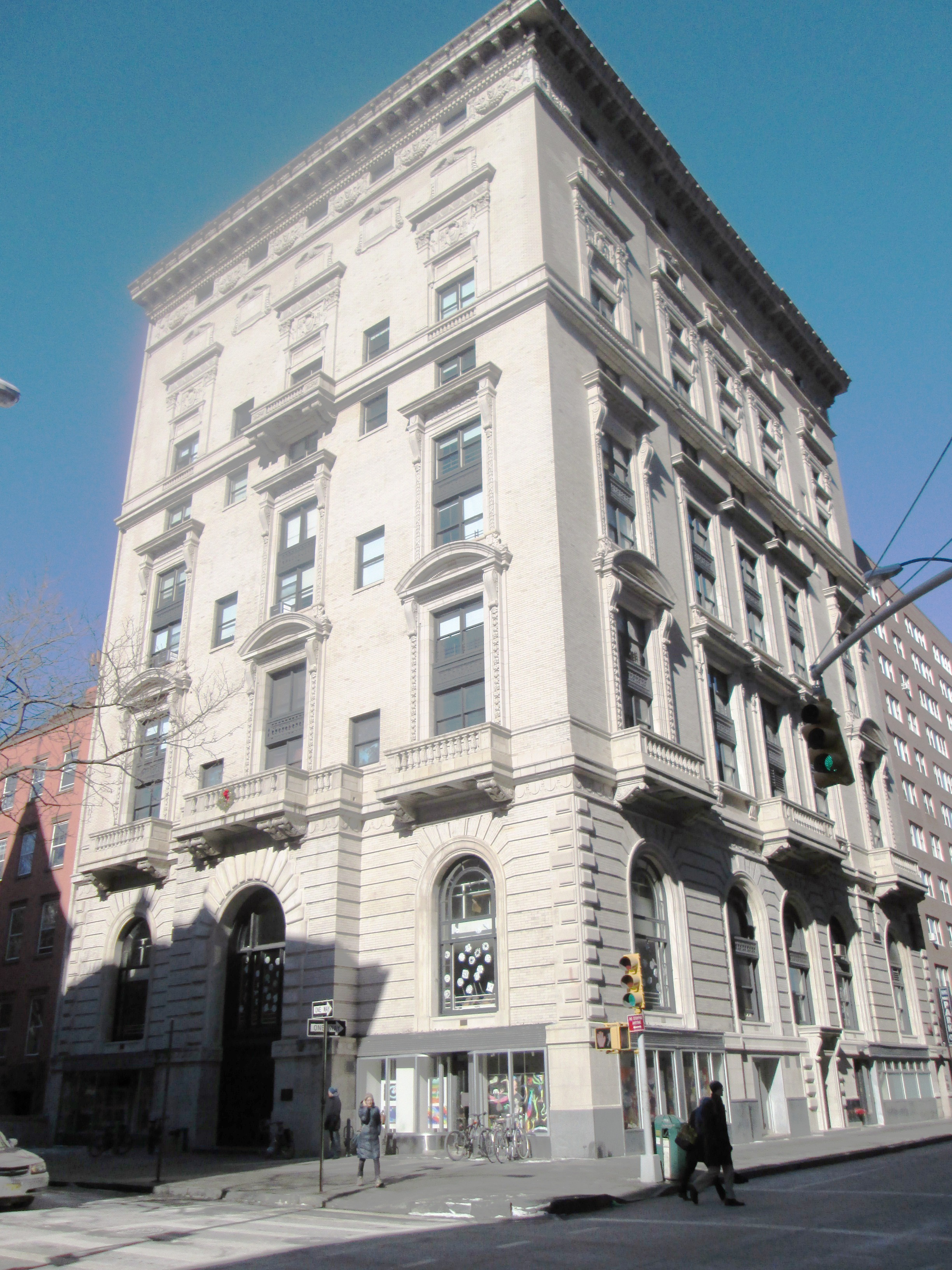
- 2013

Saint Ann's School is a private school in Brooklyn, New York City. The school is a non-sectarian, co-educational pre-K–12 day school with programs in the arts, humanities, and sciences. The students number 1,012 from preschool through 12th grade, as well as 324 faculty, administration, and staff members.

The campus, located in Brooklyn Heights, includes a central 15-story building, two adjoining brownstones, and a preschool and kindergarten located near the main campus. Annual tuition as of 2022 is between $48,000 and $52,000.

== History ==
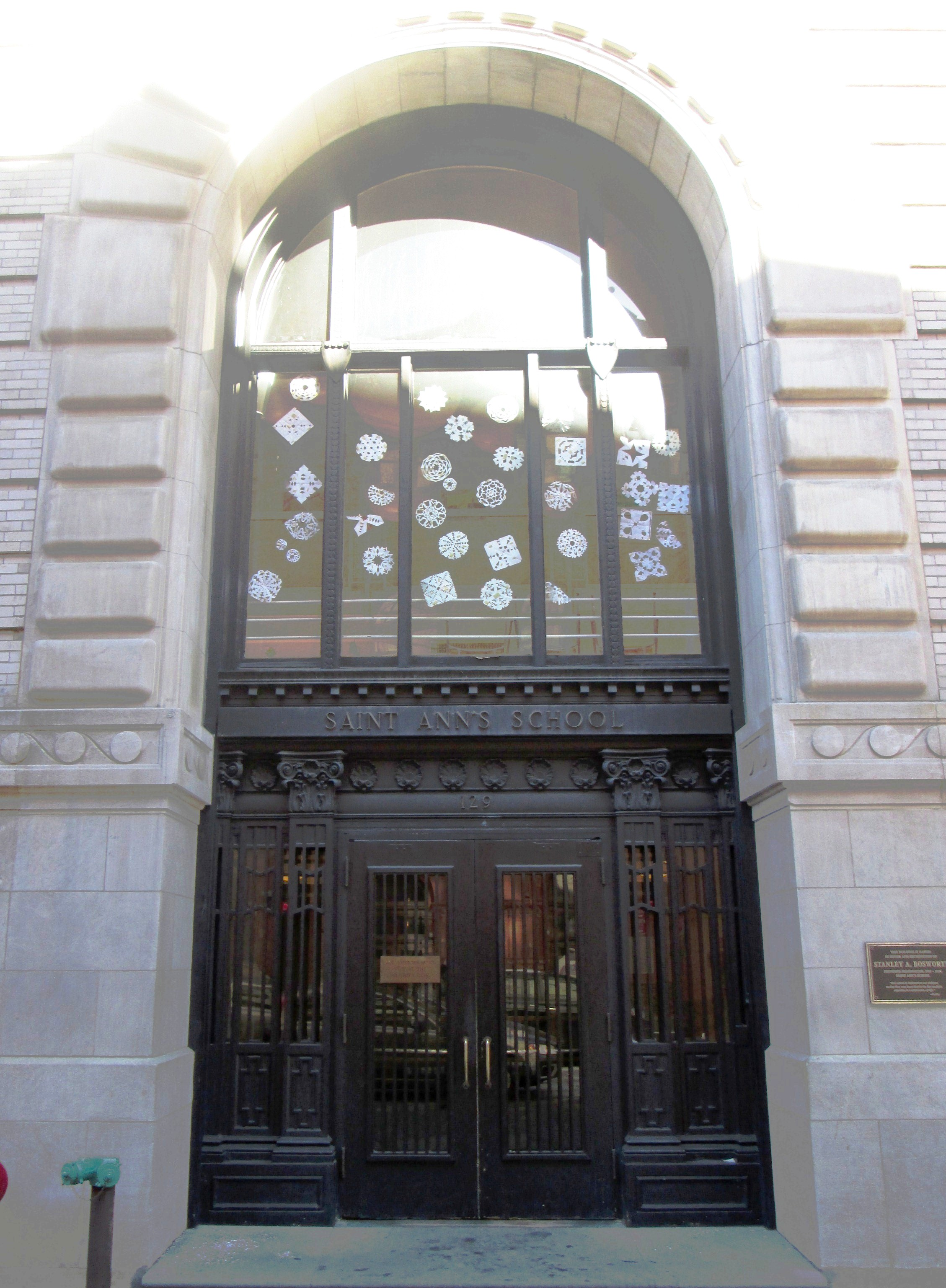
The entrance to the Bosworth Building

Saint Ann's School was founded in 1965 with 63 students and seven teachers in the basement of the St. Ann's Episcopal Church under the aegis of the vestry of the church and several interested parents. In 1966, the church purchased the former Crescent Athletic Club House, a building designed by Frank Freeman, which has since served as the school's main building.

Stanley Bosworth became its first headmaster. In 1982, Saint Ann's School formally disaffiliated from the church, having been granted a charter from the Board of Regents of the State of New York. In 2023, Kenyatte Reid became head of school.

== Academic program ==
The school allows its high school juniors and seniors to design their own curriculum.

In a 2004 survey conducted by The Wall Street Journal, Saint Ann's was rated the number one high school in the country for having the highest percentage of graduating seniors enroll in Ivy League and other highly selective colleges. In late 2007, The Wall Street Journal again listed Saint Ann's as one of the country's top 50 high schools for its success in preparing students to enter top American universities. In 2012, the New York Observer ranked Saint Ann's as the number one high school in New York City.

== Divisions and demographics ==
The school is organized into four divisions: preschool, lower, middle and high school. The vast majority of the students are from Brooklyn and Manhattan, although other boroughs are represented. Approximately 22 percent of the student body receive some level of scholarship aid (8.5 percent receive tuition remission; 13.5 percent receive financial aid). Approximately 33 percent of the student body are nonwhite.

In her memoirs, Claire Dederer wrote that when she was a student at Oberlin College, "all the coolest girls" had attended Saint Ann's: "They had slept with Beastie Boys when the Beastie Boys were still a punk band. They had famous parents. [...] The Saint Ann’s girls didn’t need anyone besides themselves. They ruled the school."

== Controversies ==
=== Allegations of sexual misconduct ===
In 2017, allegations of sexual misconduct by teachers were posted to Facebook. In response, the school commissioned an independent investigation, which announced in 2019 that it had identified nineteen former Saint Ann's teachers or staff who potentially engaged in inappropriate behavior or sexual misconduct with students, going back to the 1970s.

=== Suicide of Ellis Lariviere ===
In February 2021 an eighth grade Saint Ann's student, Ellis Lariviere, committed suicide after being notified that he would not be permitted to continue at the school following the end of the year. Lariviere was noted as a talented artist who struggled with dyslexia. His midyear eighth grade reports noted his problems with writing and organization, but also noted the progress he had made that year, and praised him for creative thinking and contributions to his classes. Lariviere's suicide note specifically requested that the school not hold an assembly about his death, and the school's notification to parents failed to mention that he had been told not to return to the school. Two years later, in April 2023, Lariviere's parents filed suit against the school, its headmaster, and its board of trustees for wrongful death. A commentating law professor, David C. Bloomfield, stated that despite how private schools are not required to retain students, the school did make an ethical commitment not to give up on students.

=== Hiring of Winston Nguyen ===
In July 2024, Saint Ann's math teacher Winston Nguyen was arrested and charged with "use of a child in a sexual performance, promoting a sexual performance by a child and disseminating indecent material to a minor", among other charges. It was revealed that Nguyen had previously been convicted of grand larceny, stealing more than $300,000 from an elderly couple he worked for, and that Saint Ann's had been aware of his criminal past when they hired him. Nguyen pleaded guilty to the charges relating to the July 2024 arrest in March 2025 and was sentenced to seven years in prison on March 19.

== Faculty and alumni ==
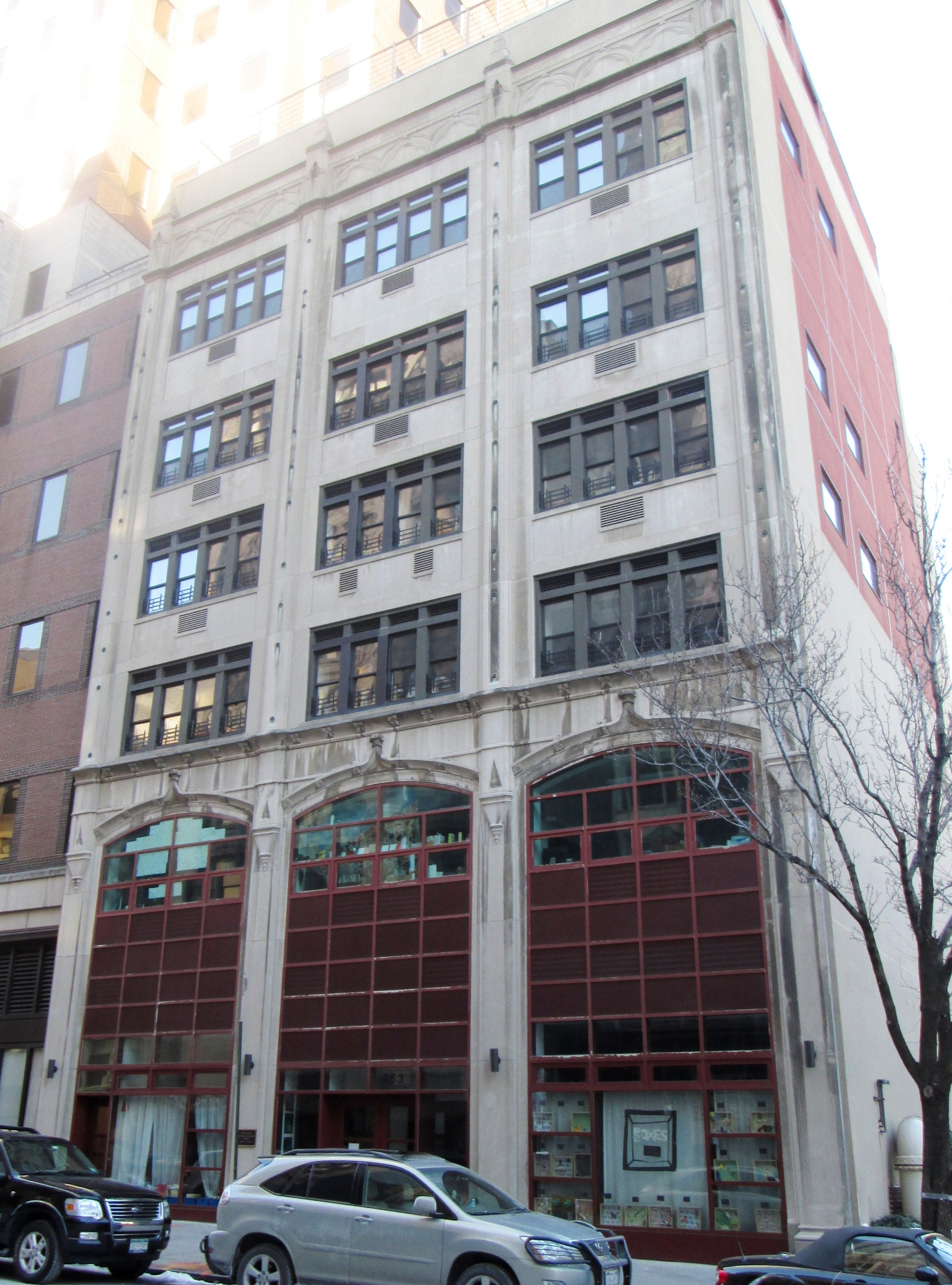
The school's Farber Building at 153 Pierrepont Street

The school maintains a list called The Growing Shelf, which documents all published community members.

=== Notable faculty ===
- Pearl Abraham (novelist)
- Staceyann Chin (poet and LGBT activist)
- Mark Denbeaux (lawyer)
- Jonathan Elliott (composer)
- Oskar Eustis (artistic director of Public Theater)
- William Everdell (historian)
- Melissa James Gibson (playwright)
- Adam Gidwitz (author)
- Laura Gilbert (flutist)
- Jonathan Hafetz (lawyer)
- Cara Hoffman (writer)
- Paul Lockhart (mathematician)
- Willard Midgette (artist)
- Anne Pierson Wiese (poet)
- Leon Reid IV (artist)
- Colette Rossant (author)
- Greg Smith (artist)
- Dave Schramm, (musician)
- Tazewell Thompson (theater director)
- Heather A. Williams (historian)

=== Notable alumni ===
- Actors
  - Jon Abrahams
  - Eva Amurri
  - Jennifer Connelly
  - Paz de la Huerta
  - Caitlin Dulany
  - Cyrus Dunham
  - Lena Dunham
  - Alexis Dziena
  - India Ennenga
  - Michael Esper
  - Josh Hamilton
  - Maya Hawke
  - Fred Hechinger
  - Lucas Hedges
  - Michelle Hurd
  - Monica Keena
  - Jemima Kirke
  - Lola Kirke
  - Stephen Mailer
  - Griffin Newman
  - Mia Sara
  - Eric Stuart
  - Lee Seo-jin
- Filmmakers and screenwriters
  - Akiva Goldsman (screenwriter)
  - Ry Russo-Young (director)
  - Lena Dunham
  - Jonás Cuarón (screenwriter)
  - Dan Goor (screenwriter)
  - Immy Humes (documentary filmmaker)
  - Garret Linn (filmmaker)
  - Sarah-Violet Bliss (filmmaker)
- Musicians and writers
  - Mike D (musician, member of Beastie Boys)
  - Stefan Zeniuk (musician)
  - Barbara Brousal (musician)
  - Vera Sola (musician, singer-songwriter, poet)
  - Dan Coleman (composer)
  - Simone Dinnerstein (pianist)
  - Tomás Doncker (guitarist)
  - Erika Nickrenz (pianist)
  - Jeff Yang (author, journalist)
  - Anna Ziegler (playwright)
  - Meghan O'Rourke (poet)
  - Anne Midgette (journalist)
  - Sasha Frere-Jones (writer/music critic)
  - Jaida Jones (fantasy author)
  - Thomas Beller (author and editor)
  - Rebecca Pronsky (singer-songwriter)
  - Zoë Jenny (writer)
  - Emma Straub (writer)
  - John Pomfret (journalist)
  - Ivy Pochoda (novelist)
  - Joanna Fuhrman (poet)
  - Alissa Quart (poet)
  - Ann Herendeen (writer)
  - Lynn Nottage (playwright)
  - Sam Sifton (journalist)
  - Samantha Gillison (writer)
  - Eliza Callahan (singer)
  - Lucy Wainwright Roche (singer-songwriter)
  - Dan Brenner (musician)
- Other notables
  - Zac Posen (fashion designer)
  - Katherine Healy (figure skater/ballerina)
  - Meredith Rainey (athlete),
  - Adam Bosworth (technology engineer)
  - Willa Shalit (entrepreneur)
  - Vito Schnabel (art curator)
  - Benjamin B. Wagner (attorney)
  - Daniel Weinreb (computer scientist)
  - Christopher Bouton (technologist)
  - Jean-Michel Basquiat (artist)
  - Risa L. Goluboff (law professor)
  - Derrick Niederman (mathematician and author)
  - Tobias Frere-Jones (type designer)
  - Chitra Ganesh (artist)
  - Kate Shepherd (artist)
  - Justine Cassell (professor)
  - Christian Martin (television executive)
  - Bernadette Meyler (Stanford Law School professor)
  - Heather A. Williams (historian)

== See also ==
- Education in New York City
