= Eagle Warehouse & Storage Company =

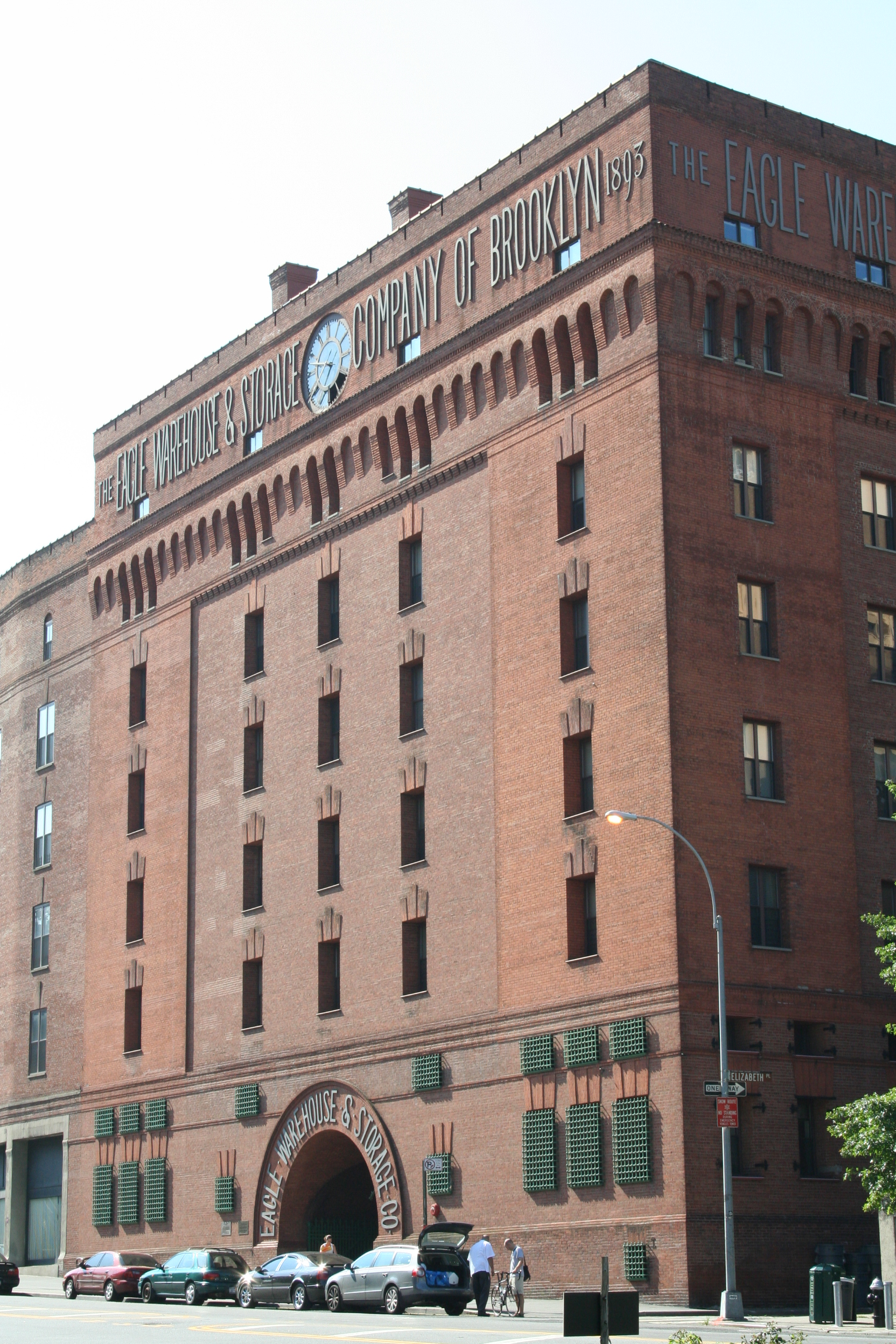
- Eagle Warehouse in 2006
- Interactive map of the Eagle Warehouse & Storage Company area

General information
- Type: Originally a warehouse; converted to apartments, 1980
- Architectural style: Richardsonian Romanesque
- Location: 28 Old Fulton St., Brooklyn, NY 11201
- Coordinates: 40°42′8.54″N 73°59′37.52″W
- Construction started: 1893
- Completed: 1894
- Renovated: 1978-1980
- Cost: $300,000
- Renovation cost: $3,000,000

Height
- Height: 8 stories

Design and construction
- Architect: Frank Freeman
- Structural engineer: P. J. Carlin

Renovating team
- Architect: Bernard Rothzeid
- Renovating firm: Rothzeid Kaiserman & Thomson

The Eagle Warehouse & Storage Company, commonly referred to as the Eagle Warehouse, is a building in the Dumbo and Brooklyn Heights neighborhoods of Brooklyn in New York City. Designed by Brooklyn architect Frank Freeman and completed in 1894, it had a number of uses before being converted into apartments in 1980. Described as a "masterpiece", the building is part of the Fulton Ferry District, which was listed on the National Register of Historic Places in 1974 and became a New York City designated landmark in 1977.

== History ==
The site on which the Eagle Warehouse is located formerly belonged to the Brooklyn Eagle, a well-known local newspaper. From 1846 to 1848, the paper's editor was Walt Whitman.

In the late 19th century the Brooklyn Eagle moved its offices to a different location. The site was subsequently purchased by the Eagle Warehouse & Storage Company, whose name was probably derived from that of the Brooklyn Eagle. Prominent Brooklyn architect Frank Freeman was commissioned to build a new fireproof warehouse on the site. The warehouse, which was constructed around the old Brooklyn Eagle pressroom, was completed in 1894 at a cost of $300,000 including furnishings.

The Eagle Warehouse & Storage Company used the warehouse primarily to store furniture and silverware, the latter kept in giant fireproof vaults in the basement. In 1906, Freeman added a seven-story extension to the east side, which is "entirely in character" with the original building. Between 1904 and 1928, part of the warehouse was used as the headquarters of the Brooklyn Law School.

The warehouse played a minor role in the city's political history when it became one of three Brooklyn locations used to store the ballots, pending a recount, of the contested 1905 Mayoral election between George B. McClellan, Jr. and newspaper magnate William Randolph Hearst, who accused his victorious opponent of fraud. The case was to drag on for years, with Hearst posting guards to protect the ballot boxes, before finally losing his bid to have the election result overturned.

The building was subsequently used for a variety of purposes. In 1977, it became part of the Fulton Ferry Historic District, a city historic district designated by the New York City Landmarks Preservation Commission. In 1980, the building was "expertly" renovated into condominiums by Brooklyn architect Bernard Rothzeid for the sum of $3,000,000, including the $530,000 purchase price. In 2021, one of the building's 85 apartments was sold for $2,500,000.

== Description ==
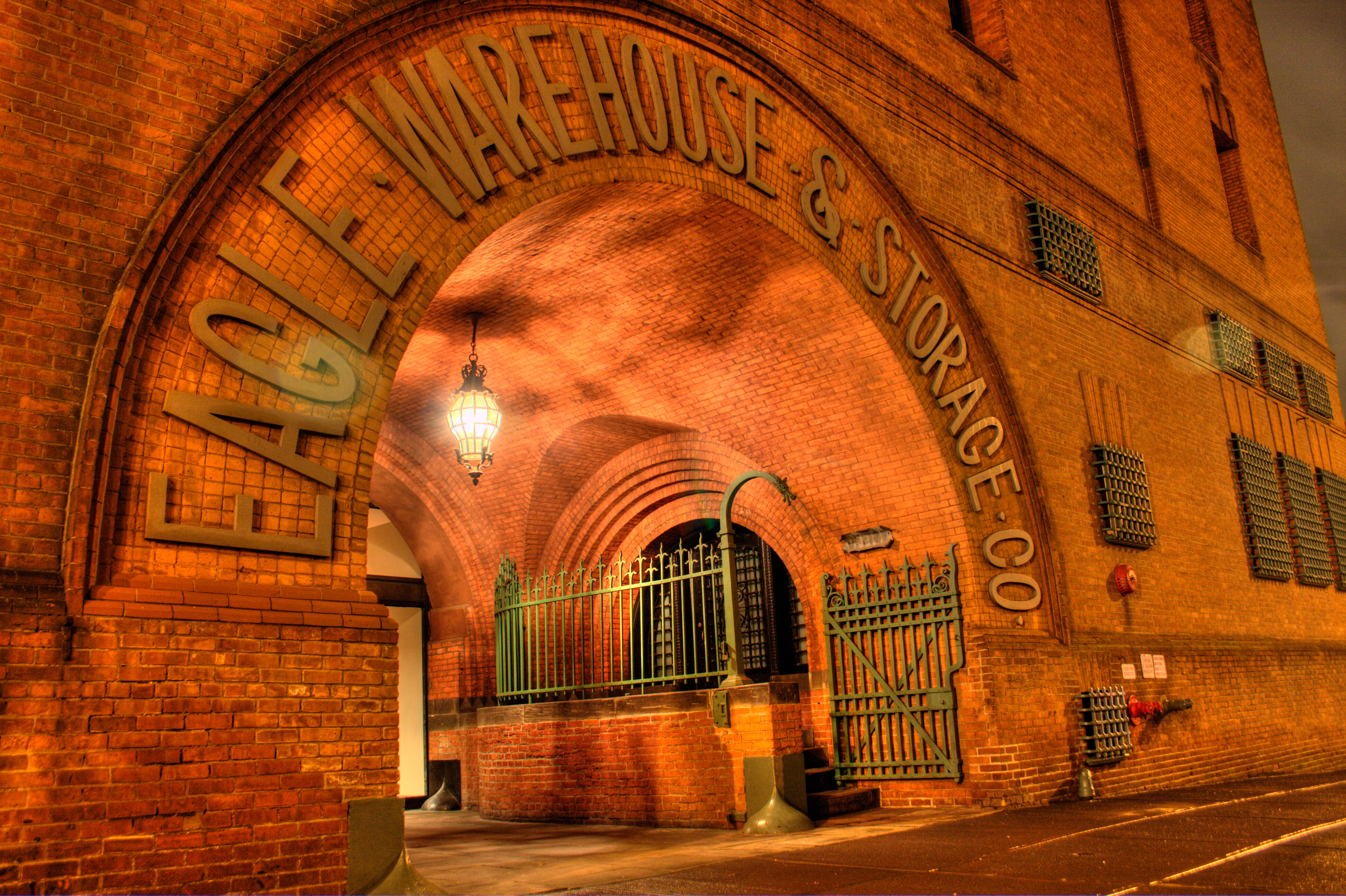
The Eagle Warehouse main entrance at night

The Eagle Warehouse has been described as "an exceptionally handsome brick warehouse" and as a Freeman "masterpiece". New York Times correspondent Christopher Gray characterized it as "a medieval brick fortress [which] recalls the Palazzo Vecchio in Florence", while critic Francis Morrone has remarked that the warehouse, in spite of its relative simplicity, "is in its own way no less interesting" than Freeman's residential or civic buildings.

The building is divided vertically into three sections. The ground floor is dominated by the main entrance, a bold Roman arch emblazoned with the company name in large bronze lettering, which leads into a "magnificent" barrel vault. On either side of the entrance are several small windows "protected by handsome iron grilles." A simple belt course separates the ground floor from the next four floors, which are slightly recessed and divided into four rows of four rectangular windows with crowned arches. The top section of the building consists of a row of small attic windows, spaced between brick corbels supporting a crenellated parapet. Along the face of the parapet the name of the company again appears in bold lettering, with a large clock set in the center.

When the building was converted in 1980, its center was demolished to create an atrium descending to the ground floor, whose primary purpose is to provide light to the apartments. The building's penthouse has the large clock face as a window.
