= Andrew Dolkart =

American architectural historian and academic

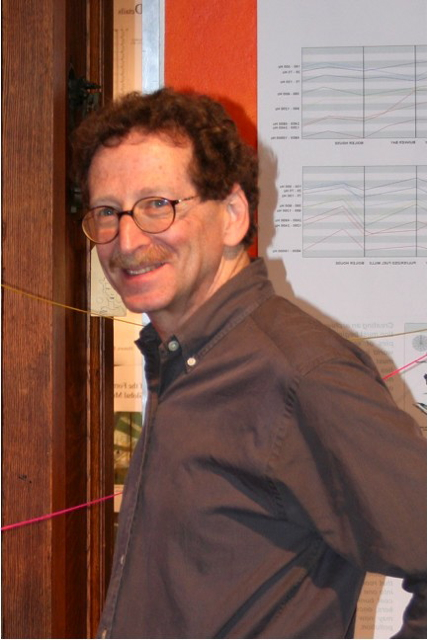
Andrew Dolkart

Andrew Scott Dolkart is a professor of historic preservation at the Columbia University Graduate School of Architecture, Planning and Preservation (GSAPP) and served as the director of the school's Historic Preservation Program from 2008 to 2016.

Dolkart's work focuses on historic preservation and the architecture and development of New York City. Dolkart holds a Bachelor of Arts degree from Colgate University (1973) and a Master of Science degree in historic preservation from Columbia University (1977), and previously worked at the New York City Landmarks Preservation Commission.

== Historic preservation ==
Dolkart first became interested in historic preservation during his graduate studies in art history. He has authored many of the New York City Landmarks Preservation Commission's reports and served as an editor for the first edition of the Guide to New York City Landmarks. He was described as someone who is "without peer among New York's architectural researchers" by architectural critic Francis Morrone. In 2014 he received the Historic District Council's Landmarks Lion award.

Along with Jay Shockley and Ken Lustbader, Dolkart is a founding member of the NYC LGBT Historic Sites Project, begun in 2015, and serves as a Project Director for the group.

In his teaching and writing Dolkart stresses the importance of Vernacular architecture based more on commercial need than strictly stylistic preferences. Much of his work emphasizes the practical and economic aspects of buildings, whether they were constructed to meet the needs of the garment industry, tenement housing, or high-end housing designed primarily to meet the profit objectives of speculative real estate developers.

== Prizes and awards ==
- Historic Districts Council's Landmarks Lion award
- Society of Architectural Historians, Antoinette Forrester Downing Award for "The Row House Reborn," 2012.
- New York City Book Awards, Architectural History Award for "The Row House Reborn," 2010.
- Victorian Society in America, Metropolitan Chapter, Architectural History Award for "The Row House Reborn," 2010.
- New York City Book Awards, Cultural History Award for "Biography of a Tenement House in New York City," 2007.
- Metropolitan Chapter of the Victorian Society in America. Special Citation for "Biography of a Tenement House in New York City," 2007.
- Historic Districts Council, Grass Roots Preservation Award. Awarded for advocacy in the preservation of the Thomson Meter Company Building, Brooklyn. 2004.
- Lower Hudson Conference of Historical Agencies and Museums. Award for Excellence in archival-based scholarship, 2002, for "Central Synagogue in Its Changing Neighborhood."
- Victorian Society in America New York Chapter. Award for contributions to the preservation of New York’s Victorian built environment, 1999.
- Winner, Association of American Publishers's 1998 Award for Excellence in Professional/Scholarly Publishing, Best Book in Architecture and Urban Planning for "Morningside Heights: A History of its Architecture and Development."

== Selected publications ==
- “Fifty Years of Landmarking,” in Donald Albrect and Andrew S. Dolkart, eds., "Saving Place: 50 Years of New York City Landmarks" (Museum of the City of New York and Monacelli Press, 2015).
- “Designing Woodlawn: Architecture and Landscapes,” in "Sylvan Cemetery: Architecture, Art & Landscape at Woodlawn" (Avery Library and Woodlawn Cemetery, 2014).
- The Row House Reborn: Architecture and Neighborhoods in New York City, 1908-1929 (Johns Hopkins University Press, 2009).
- Biography of a Tenement House in New York City: An Architectural History of 97 Orchard Street (University of Virginian Press, 2006).
- Morningside Heights: A History of Its Architecture and Development (Columbia University Press, 1998).
- Guide to New York City Landmarks (1992; expanded and updated, John Wiley, 1998, 2003)

== See also ==
- Architecture of New York City
- LGBT culture in New York City
- List of LGBT people from New York City
- NYC Pride March
