= Bushwick Democratic Club House =

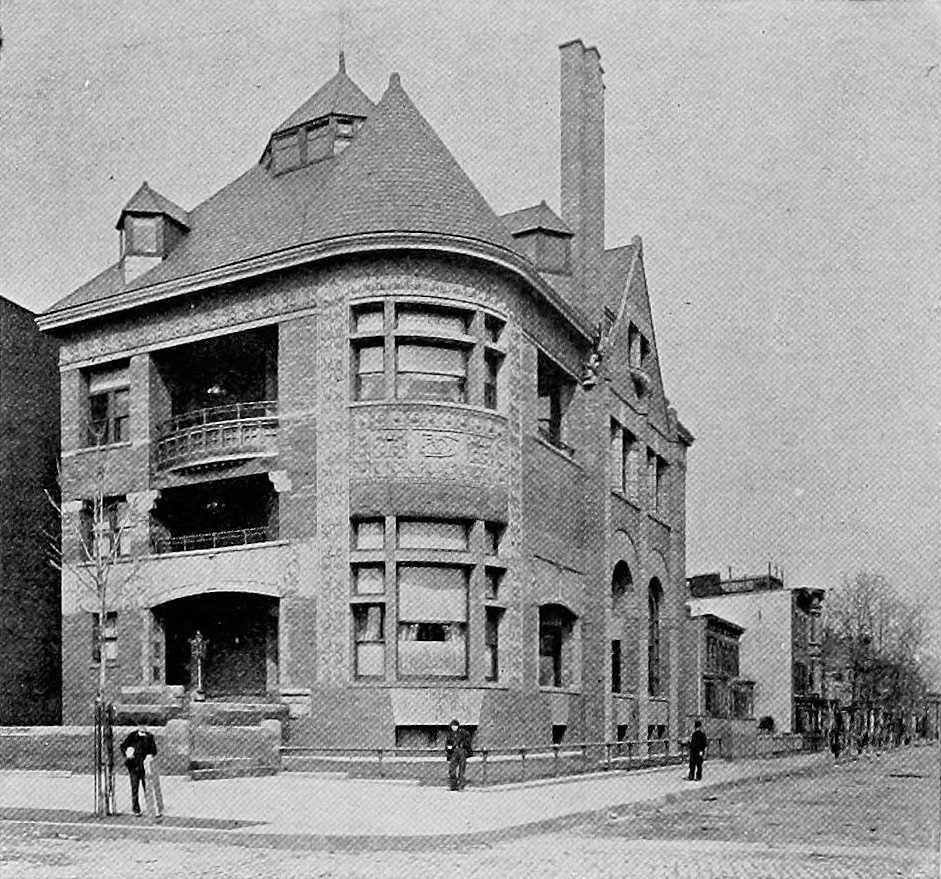
- Interactive map of the Bushwick Democratic Club House area
- Alternative names: Bethesda Pentecostal Church

General information
- Location: Intersection of Bushwick Ave. and Hart St., Brooklyn, 719 Bushwick Av
- Coordinates: 40°41′47.23″N 73°55′49.24″W
- Construction started: June 30, 1891
- Completed: 1892
- Inaugurated: September 23, 1892
- Destroyed: By fire, after 1970
- Cost: About $60,000
- Owner: 1891: Bushwick Democratic Club; 1941: Knights of Columbus; 1966: Pentecostal Church

Height
- Height: 4 stories not including basement and attic

Dimensions
- Other dimensions: 60 by 70 feet

Design and construction
- Architect: Frank Freeman

The Bushwick Democratic Club House was a building located in Bushwick, Brooklyn, New York City. The building, designed by Brooklyn-based architect Frank Freeman in his signature Richardsonian Romanesque style, was completed in 1892, and designated a New York City Landmark in the 1970s. It was later destroyed by fire.

== History ==
The Bushwick Democratic Club, a political club for local members of the Democratic Party, was first organized in October 1890. After the 1890 election, the members decided to construct a new building for the club's activities, for an amount not exceeding $60,000. A block of land was subsequently acquired for the purpose on the corner of Bushwick Avenue and Hart Street, Brooklyn. Frank Freeman, the same architect who had designed the recently completed Thomas Jefferson Association Building for the Kings County Democrats, was commissioned to design the new building.

The foundation stone was laid on June 30, 1891 by Brooklyn Mayor Alfred C. Chapin, with New York Lieutenant Governor Edward F. Jones and a large crowd also in attendance. After the ceremony, a sumptuous banquet for 300 Democratic Party dignitaries was held, at which were read letters from former U.S. President Grover Cleveland and Governor David B. Hill expressing their regrets at being unable to attend. The building was officially opened on September 23 of the following year, with Lieutenant Governor William F. Sheehan and Brooklyn Mayor David A. Boody giving the main speeches.

In 1941, the building was sold to the Knights of Columbus, who retained it for 25 years. Thereafter it became the Bethesda Pentecostal Church. On September 15, 1970, it was designated a New York City landmark. The building was eventually destroyed by fire.

== Description ==
An "astounding, round-edged cube ... wrap[ping] a tight skin of precise decoration around a compact mass", the building was described shortly after its construction in the following terms:

It is a beautiful structure, Romanesque in style, slightly modernized. The exterior trimmings are of light terra cotta and red sandstone which, with the old gold mottled brick of which the walls are composed, produce a fine effect. There is a court yard of twenty-five feet in front of the building, and the main entrance is reached by a series of steps and landings, on which are handsomely wrought bronze lamps with incandescent electric lights. The furniture, including buffet, billiard and pool tables, is of quartered, figured oak, the carpets are of velvet; the draperies are of soft, warm-colored figured silk, and the decorations on the walls and ceilings are in delicate tints, harmonizing perfectly with the other appointments. The basement is occupied by the bowling alleys. The café and billiard room are on the first floor, making practically one apartment with vaulted ceilings twenty-five feet high. On the mezzanine floor are the officers' rooms and the ladies' rooms. On the third floor are the banquet hall and card rooms, and on the top floor is the gymnasium. The stewards apartments and the club kitchen are above the main building at the rear.

The 1970 report by the Landmarks Preservation Commission emphasized the building's "superb Roman brick masonry, particularly in its use of rowlock arches and lintels above the openings." Another feature deemed of particular interest was "the use of recessed balconies, created by setting the walls and windows behind them, instead of projecting them out from the wall in the usual manner." The report concluded that "It is features such as these, which, in addition to the masterful use of materials, signalize the unusual work of Frank Freeman."

== See also ==
- Thomas Jefferson Association Building: another Democratic building in Brooklyn

== Bibliography ==
- Howard, Henry Ward Beecher; Jervis, Arthur N. (1893): The Eagle and Brooklyn: The Record of the Progress of the Brooklyn Daily Eagle, Volume 1, The Brooklyn Daily Eagle.
