= Christian Martin (television executive) =

American television executive

- Born: 1967 (age 58–59); New York City, New York, U.S.
- Occupation: Television executive
- Known for: Vice president of broadband strategy and development at A+E Networks

Christian Martin (born 1967) is an American television executive. He is currently President of Marquee Media, a division of Marquee Brands, overseeing the Martha Stewart and Emeril Lagasse media efforts. He was the general manager of SiriusXM video 2017 to 2019 as well as vice president of broadband strategy and development at A+E Networks from 2008 to 2016.

He is married to Elizabeth Catherine Cole, the executive producer of Dateline NBC.

== Early life ==
Christian was born in New York City in 1967. His mother, Nancy Fales Garrett is a playwright and school teacher. His father, Jared Martin, was an actor, photographer and past creative director of the Big Picture Alliance. His paternal grandfather was Charles E. Martin, The New Yorker cartoonist and cover artist. His maternal grandfather is the attorney Haliburton Fales II, former President of The Morgan Library in New York.

=== Education ===
He attended Saint Ann's School in Brooklyn, New York. He went to college at University of Michigan where he received a BA in 1989 and then to New York University where he received an MA in 1993.

== Career ==
Martin is currently the president of Marquee Media overseeing streaming, podcasts, books, social media and distribution for Martha Stewart and Emeril Lagasse. In 2021 he signed a three-year, 234-episode deal to produce 78 shows a year for Stewart and Lagasse as part of the Roku Channel's Roku Originals series. Martin is credited as an executive producer on the shows which were nominated for five daytime Emmys in 2022. Martin oversees Stewart's podcast on iHeart, runs her TikTok account and oversees all publishing for her deals with Penguin Random House as well as HarperCollins.

Martin was vice president and general manager of video for SiriusXM for two years overseeing video for The Howard Stern Show.

Martin held the post of Vice President Broadband Strategy and Development for A+E Networks also known as Lifetime Networks from June 2008 till 2016. At A+E, Christian is responsible for all broadband, loosely described as video, where he and his team created all of the Project Runway video extras including the Tim Gunn's Workroom and the Project Runway Buzz Room, an aggregation of all the internet chatter around Project Runway.

He worked for NBC News, mostly for Dateline NBC, from 1993 till 2006. He has also covered the 2000, 2002, 2004 and 2006 Olympics for NBC Sports. He won Sports Emmys for his coverage of the 2000, 2002 and 2004 Olympics.

From 2003 to 2006 he was primarily Ann Curry's producer for NBC. Together they covered earthquakes in Pakistan, the tsunami in Sri Lanka, interviewed First Lady Laura Bush, Brad Pitt and Angelina Jolie, and the American hostage Thomas Hamill.

In August, 2006 he moved to iVillage.com where he was vice president and the executive producer of content, Programming and Integration. He held that post through May 2008.

He was featured in "Covering Catastrophy: Broadcast Journalists Report September 11." Martin covering the event for NBC News bought a camera from a tourist on the street and recorded the collapse of the south tower while standing near its base . He was thrown by the blast, briefly losing consciousness and then made it uptown to the Today Show studios where he appeared with Tom Brokaw, Matt Lauer and Katie Couric. He also appeared on Dateline NBC. The video tape he shot appeared frequently in the weeks and months after the collapse. Film director Oliver Stone licensed a snippet of that footage for his 2006 movie, World Trade Center.

Martin was a panelist at New York University's The Journalism of 9-11 – A Decade Later.

Martin was an eyewitness to Flight 1549—the US airplane that landed in the Hudson River. He appeared on the NBC Nightly News and Dateline that evening.

Martin published a short story called Abandoned Car for the on-line publication Mr. Beller's Neighborhood in August 2021. (web citation: https://mrbellersneighborhood.com/author/christianmartin)

== Awards ==
- 2015 Cynopsis Model D award – Best Web Series
- 2000 & 2002 & 2004 Sports Emmy
- 2004 Genesis Award
- 2001 Sigma Delta Chi Award
- 2001 Edward R. Murrow Award
- 1999 Clarion Award
- 1998 CINE
- 1997 First Place International Television – Robert F. Kennedy Journalism Award
- 1996 – Gold Medal Investigative Reporters and Editors, Inc.
- 1993 Sid Gross Investigative Journalism Award (NYU)
- nine News Emmy nominations 2004, 2003, 2002, 2001, 2000 and 1994
