= Rebecca Pronsky =

American singer-songwriter

Rebecca Pronsky (born September 4, 1980) is a singer-songwriter from Brooklyn, New York. Her musical style combines folk, jazz, alternative, and country elements. She has been described as having "a voice that's full of character, sensitive and rich", and as writing songs that are "short and sharp... stimulating and catchy".

== Early life ==
Pronsky was born in Brooklyn, New York City and began professional vocal training at the age of eight. In 1996 she met Lucy Wainwright Roche, then a fellow high school student at Saint Ann's School. Wainwright Roche introduced her to folk music and Pronsky began to study guitar. Pronsky attended Brown University and graduated in 2002 with a degree in Ethnomusicology. However, it wasn't until she left college that she considered music to be a serious career option.

== Musical career ==
Pronsky recorded several songs she had written while in college upon graduating and released this collection as her first demo Milestone in 2002. She moved back to Brooklyn soon after and began working with other musicians to explore her sound more fully. She met Rich Bennett (Friendly Bears, Monocle, Rich Bennett, Roman Angelos) in 2003 and the two began a musical collaboration.

In 2005, Pronsky created the Brooklyn Songwriters Exchange, a music series presenting strong local songwriters in the New York City area.

Nine Mile Records released Departures & Arrivals (2007), folllowed by Viewfinder (2011), and Only Daughter (2013) which were mixed by Scott Solter and produced by Bennett. Track 1 "Hard Times" from "Viewfinder" was featured on Song of the Day on NPR Music, on April 18, 2011, due to its topical relevance. Only Daughter is lyrically abstract and deals with the themes of political corruption and personal struggle.

Pronsky has toured extensively in the US, UK and Europe. She has been the supporting act on shows featuring Shawn Colvin, Steve Forbert, Peter Case, Catie Curtis, Sarah Bettens, Josh Ritter, Loudon Wainwright III, Patty Larkin, and Caroline Herring among others.

In 2017, Pronsky shifted her focus to production and musical theatre writing, working on various projects, most recently, the musical "Einstein's Begonia" about a houseplant that belonged to Albert Einstein. Einstein's Begonia is a collaboration with playwright Alexis Roblan.

== Discography ==
2020 Candidate Jams (2020; US; Acme Hall Studios)

Witness: Hillary's Song Cycle (2017; US: self-released)

Known Objects (2016; US; Acme Hall Recordings)

Only Daughter (2013; US; Nine Mile Records)

Viewfinder (2011; US; Nine Mile Records)

The Best Game in Town (2009; limited edition EP: US; Nine Mile Records)

Departures & Arrivals (2007; US; Nine Mile Records)

The Early Hours (2004; EP, US; self-released)

== Personal life ==
Pronsky is married to her musical partner Rich Bennett.
