= Crescent Athletic Club House =

Building in Brooklyn, New York

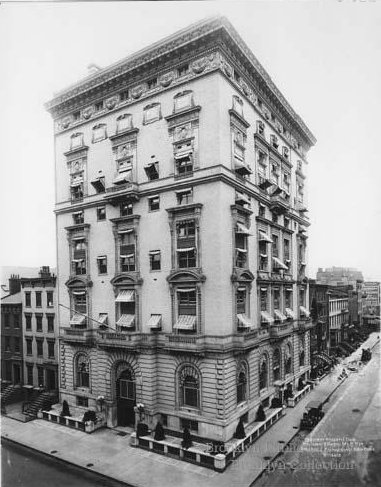
- (c.1910)

General information
- Architectural style: Classical revival
- Location: 129 Pierrepont Street, Brooklyn, New York, United States
- Coordinates: 40°41′42″N 73°59′32″W
- Completed: 1906
- Client: Crescent Athletic Club

Design and construction
- Architect: Frank Freeman

The Crescent Athletic Club House is a building at 129 Pierrepont Street at the corner of Clinton Street in Brooklyn Heights, Brooklyn, New York City. Designed by prominent Brooklyn-based architect Frank Freeman for the Crescent Athletic Club and completed in 1906, the building is known today as the Bosworth Building of Saint Ann's School.

== History ==
The Crescent Athletic Club was one of the most successful New York sporting clubs of the late 19th/early 20th centuries. Organized in 1884, the club rapidly grew to 1,500 members by 1902, at which time it was decided to build a new clubhouse. Brooklyn architect Frank Freeman was commissioned to design the building, which was completed in 1906.

By the 1920s, membership of such clubs was in decline, and in 1939 the Crescent Athletic Club filed for bankruptcy, vacating its Brooklyn clubhouse the following year. Through the 1940s and 1950s the building was used for office space and stores, while a bowling alley operated out of the basement.

In 1966 the building was purchased for use as a school by the nearby St. Ann's Episcopal Church for the sum of $365,000. By 1982, the school had become a separate entity from the Church. In 2000, the School paid $1 million to have the building's facade renovated. The building is referred to by the school as the Bosworth Building, after the school's first headmaster.

== Description ==
Though sometimes disparaged in comparison with Freeman's earlier Richardsonian Romanesque works, this Classical Revival building rooted in north Italian 16th-century palazzo styles nevertheless incorporates some interesting design features. Chief among these is the fact that the building appears to be only four or five stories in height, when in fact it is twelve. The optical illusion is achieved primarily by the use of double-height windows which each span two floors.

The base of the building is constructed of channelled, rusticated limestone, while the stories above are of a light-colored brick, with terra cotta ornaments. The rusticated ground floor is capped with a prominent cornice which forms a continuous line with a series of balustraded balconies below the pedimented windows. Arising directly from the segmental arches of these window pediments is the third level of windows, an unusual arrangement which serves to enhance the overall illusion of decreased height. Above this level is a second cornice with more balustraded balconies, from which the final level of double-height windows arises. At the top of the building is a row of smaller attic windows, "set within a magnificent terra cotta frieze", and a final, heavy cornice.

The interior of the clubhouse originally featured "a fantastic variety of spaces", including a swimming pool, rifle range and bowling alley in the basement, squash and handball courts, a gymnasium on the top floor, a billiard room, a double-height, oak-panelled dining room on the third floor, a grand hall, sleeping quarters and a library. Much of the original interior has since been altered, but the building retains some of its original rooms. The decorated marble floor in the main hall is now covered with linoleum, while the classical-style murals in the hall and library have also survived, albeit in indifferent condition.
