= Long Island City Fire Department =

Former fire department of Long Island City, New York

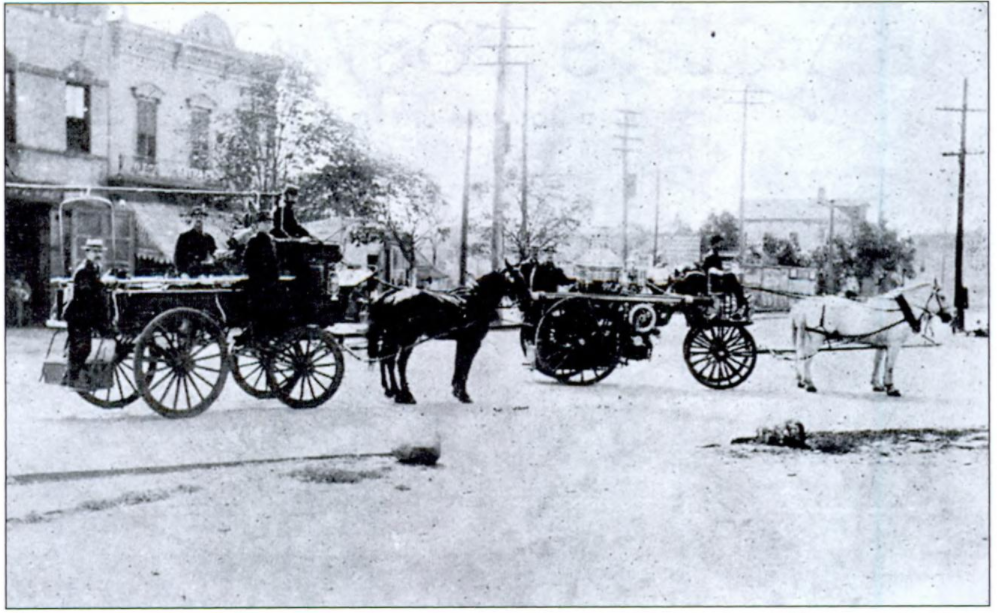
the Long Island City Fire Department existed until 1898, when it was amalgamated into the FDNY.

The Long Island City Fire Department was run by the independent municipality of Long Island City, in what is now Queens, New York City.

The LICFD was a volunteer fire department until 1891, when the Department made the transition to all paid firefighters. At that time, it consisted of 8 engine companies, 3 hose companies, and 1 hook and ladder company.

Rather than operating a fireboat of its own, the Department made use of a vessel owned by the Newtown Creek Towing Company, named Protector, on as-needed basis.

After the 1898 consolidation of Queens with the other four boroughs and creation of the modern City of New York, the companies and equipment of the Brooklyn and Long Island City Fire Departments were merged with the New York City Fire Department (FDNY) on January 28, 1898. Unlike some other smaller cities, Long Island City's firefighters were full-time employees, not volunteers, so they were all transferred to the FDNY. The companies of the former Queens and Brooklyn fire departments were renumbered in 1913.
