= Hotel Margaret =

Hotel in Brooklyn, New York

Coordinates: 40°41′59″N 73°59′43.5″W

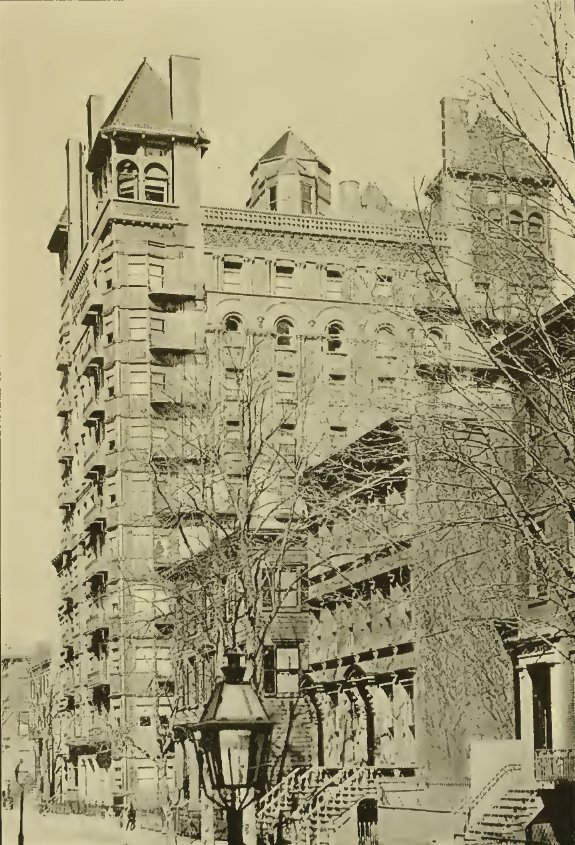
- The hotel as it appeared in the 1890s
- Interactive map of the Hotel Margaret area

General information
- Type: Hotel
- Architectural style: Richardsonian Romanesque
- Location: Intersection of Columbia Hts. and Orange St., Brooklyn, 97 Columbia Heights
- Completed: 1889
- Renovated: 1980
- Destroyed: By fire, 1980
- Client: John Arbuckle

Height
- Height: 10 stories

Design and construction
- Architect: Frank Freeman

The Hotel Margaret was a building in Brooklyn Heights, Brooklyn, New York. Designed by Frank Freeman and completed in 1889, the hotel was the locality's first skyscraper and for many years remained its tallest building. It was destroyed by a 1980 fire that started when a person who was using taping compound left a heater on and forgot to turn it off during renovations.

== History ==
The hotel was built for John Arbuckle, a Brooklyn coffee and sugar importer, and named after his sister Margaret. Prominent Brooklyn-based architect Frank Freeman was commissioned to design the building, which was completed in 1889.

For many years, the hotel remained the tallest building in the locality, becoming a "familiar and appreciated" sight to the locals. It was home to several prominent artists, including etcher Joseph Pennell, Nobel Prize-winning novelist Sigrid Undset, and Betty Smith, author of A Tree Grows in Brooklyn.

The building was remodelled in 1958, and at this time given a coat of "neutral-toned" paint which caused it to lose some of its polychromatic appeal. In 1980, work began on converting the hotel into condominiums, but the building caught fire during the renovation and burned down.

In 1986, architect Stanton Eckstut was hired to design a new residence on the site, which incorporates architectural elements that pay tribute to the former hotel's copper patina details, terracotta façade, and corner bay windows. While the new building was under construction, the property was sold to the Jehovah's Witnesses and has been used to accommodate members of their headquarters staff.

== Description ==
Completed in architect Frank Freeman's signature Richardsonian Romanesque style, the building has been described as "a rangy, Victorian apartment house in brick, terra cotta and pressed metal with vivid and witty ornament" and as "the outstanding building of the Post Civil War period" in the locality. A contemporary source described the building as:

... a huge and imposing apartment house, designed by Frank Freeman in a free adaptation of Romanesque. From its upper story there is a superb river view, from the street or the East River Bridge an impressive sky line. It is quaintly balconied and recessed, and the deep brown red of its brick harmonizes admirably with its iron work.

The building was topped by large, pyramidal-roofed rectangular towers, which offered excellent views of the cityscape. Primary building materials utilized in its appearance were stone, brick, terra cotta and copper.
