= Thomas Jefferson Association Building =

Former building in Brooklyn, New York

Coordinates: 40.693702°N 73.990383°W

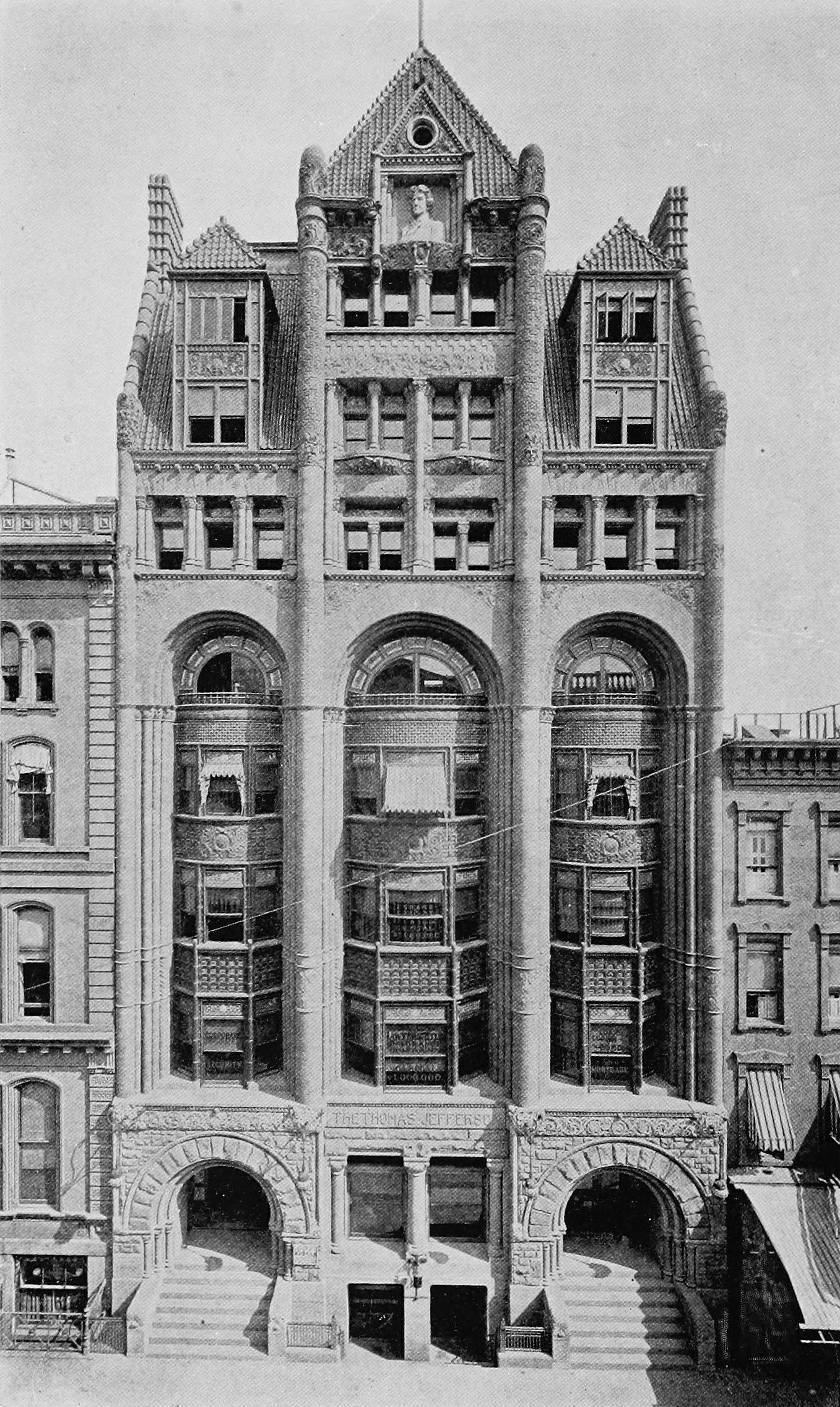
- The building not long after construction, c. 1893
- Interactive map of the Thomas Jefferson Association Building area

General information
- Type: Commercial
- Architectural style: Richardsonian Romanesque
- Location: 4-5 Court Square, Brooklyn
- Construction started: November 13, 1889
- Completed: 1890
- Inaugurated: September 23, 1890
- Demolished: 1960
- Cost: $150,000

Height
- Height: 8 stories

Dimensions
- Other dimensions: Frontage 55 ft Depth 110 ft

Design and construction
- Architect: Frank Freeman

The Thomas Jefferson Association Building was a building located in Brooklyn Heights, Brooklyn, New York. Designed by Brooklyn-based architect Frank Freeman and completed in 1890, it was considered a fine example of the Richardsonian Romanesque style. The building was demolished to make way for a new thoroughfare in 1960.

== History ==
The building was constructed as the result of an 1888 decision by the Kings County branch of the Democratic Party to secure a permanent headquarters for its operations, with the development of the political club model. A new organization, known as the Thomas Jefferson Association, was formed for the purpose, with a paid-up capital of $150,000, half of which was contributed by leading members of the Party and the other half by members of the ward association. The plan was to construct a seven-story building, with the first two floors reserved for Party activities and the remaining five floors rented out as office space, income from which would be returned to the Jefferson Association's members as dividends.

A property near the corner of Boerum Place and Fulton Street was acquired for the project, and architect Frank Freeman commissioned to design the building. The foundation stone was laid on November 13, 1889 by former U.S. President Grover Cleveland, with torrential rains failing to dampen the enthusiasm of a large crowd gathered to witness the occasion. The building was formally opened less than a year later on September 23, 1890, with many Democratic Party dignitaries in attendance, including the Governor of New York, David B. Hill and Brooklyn Mayor Alfred C. Chapin. The cost of the building was in excess of $100,000.

The building remained the headquarters of the Kings County Democrats until 1951, when increasing maintenance costs persuaded the owners to sell it. In 1960, it was demolished along with fourteen other buildings to make way for Adams Street, an arterial link between the Brooklyn Bridge and Atlantic Avenue.

== Description ==
The "highly creative", "extremely ornamented" building was completed in Freeman's signature Richardsonian Romanesque style. A correspondent for The New York Times described the building as:

... one of the most peculiar-looking structures in the city. The architecture is of the Romanesque order, the building being eight stories in height, with huge brick and terra cotta pillars up front. The windows are broad and very high, the effect being to cause the building to have a very light and yet, from its height, a decidedly top-heavy appearance ... The hall has seats for about nine hundred people, and is very cozy in its appearance. The woodwork is polished oak, and the walls and high-vaulted ceiling have been finished in buff paint, with dark fresco work as a relief. Electric lights are used entirely.

The ground floor, which was built of rusticated sandstone from Gatelawbridge, Scotland, featured two large, recessed Roman archways, one on each wing, which served as the main entrances. The upper stories of the facade were constructed of moulded brick and terra cotta. At the top of the building was an "enormous" bust of Thomas Jefferson, set in an alcove.

Inside, the first floor was taken up almost entirely by the Democratic Party hall, which included a stage, along with offices for the Party's General Committee. The second floor included the permanent offices of the Party Secretary and assistants. A restaurant occupied the basement, with the rest of the building given over to office space.

== See also ==
- Bushwick Democratic Club House: another Democratic building in Brooklyn

== Bibliography ==
- Dutton, Richard L. (2004): Brooklyn: The Brooklyn Daily Eagle Postcards, 1905–1907, Arcadia Publishing, ISBN 978-0-7385-3531-9.
- Howard, Henry W. B.; Jervis, Arthur N. (1893): The Eagle and Brooklyn: The Record of the Progress of the Brooklyn Daily Eagle, Volume 1, The Brooklyn Daily Eagle.
- Morrone, Francis; Iska, James (2001): An Architectural Guidebook to Brooklyn, Gibbs Smith, ISBN 978-1-58685-047-0.
