= Brooklyn Savings Bank =

Coordinates: 40.69938°N 73.99215°W

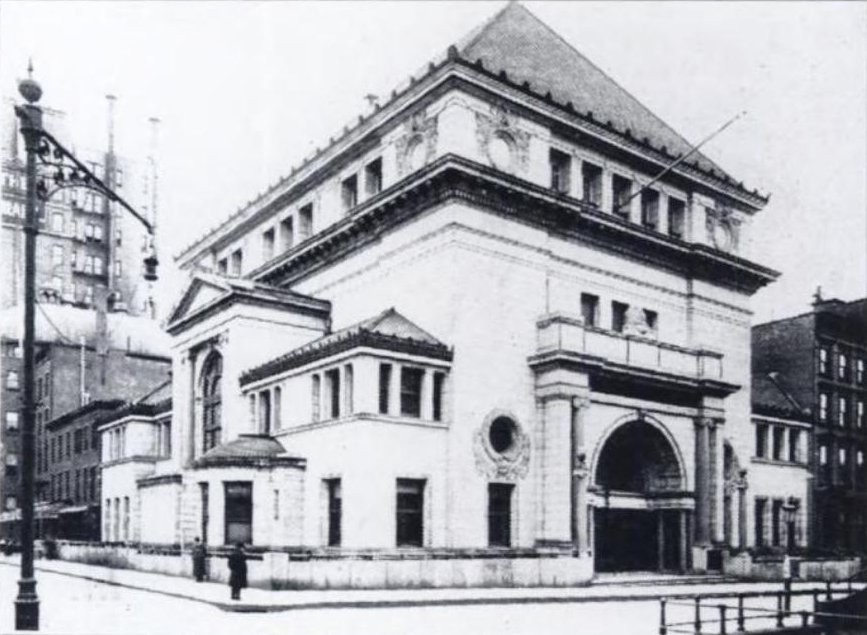
- (c. 1905-07)
- Interactive map of the Brooklyn Savings Bank area

General information
- Type: Bank
- Architectural style: Neoclassical/Italian Renaissance
- Location: Intersection of Clinton and Pierrepont Sts., Brooklyn, New York
- Construction started: 1892
- Completed: 1894
- Demolished: February 1964
- Cost: $300,000

Height
- Height: 80 ft (24 m)

Dimensions
- Other dimensions: 95 × 115 ft

Design and construction
- Architect: Frank Freeman

The Brooklyn Savings Bank was a bank in Brooklyn Heights, Brooklyn, New York. Founded in 1827, the bank relocated several times before it moved to a building designed by prominent Brooklyn architect Frank Freeman in 1894. The bank building was considered one of Freeman's finest works, but in spite of its widely recognized architectural significance, the building was demolished in 1964, shortly before the designation of the neighborhood as a historic district.

== History ==
The Brooklyn Savings Bank was established as an institution in 1827. It originally operated from the basement of the Apprentices' Library Building at the corner of Cranberry and Henry Streets in Brooklyn. In 1847, the Bank moved to new premises at the juncture of Fulton, Concord and Liberty Streets. After the opening of the Brooklyn Bridge in 1883, city planners decided to build a "grand avenue" leading to the approach of the bridge, and as the resulting plans entailed demolition of part of the Brooklyn Savings Bank in Liberty Street, the Bank's directors resolved to move to a new location.

The location chosen by the directors as the most appropriate for their new premises was the northeast corner of Clinton and Pierrepont Streets in Brooklyn, then occupied by the First Baptist Church. Though initially reluctant to move, the parishioners were eventually persuaded by an offer of $200,000, and the church was subsequently demolished to make way for the new bank. Noted Brooklyn architect Frank Freeman was commissioned to design the $300,000 building. Construction began in 1892 and was completed in 1894.

The building was to remain the Brooklyn Savings Bank's headquarters for almost 70 years. In 1961, the bank's management decided to build a new headquarters at the corner of Montague and Fulton Streets in Brooklyn, and in 1963 the old bank building was sold to the Franklin National Bank, after which it lay idle for some months. In late 1963, Franklin National announced plans to sell the property to developers for commercial redevelopment. In spite of last-ditch attempts by the community to save the historic building, it went under the wrecker's hammer in early 1964.

Loss of the bank, along with several other historic buildings around this time, prompted the city government to move to protect other buildings in the locality, and in November 1965, the area was formally designated as the Brooklyn Heights Historic District. Today the site of the bank is occupied by 1 Pierrepont Plaza, an office building built in 1987.

The Brooklyn Savings Bank moved in 1962 to a new modernist at 211 Montague Street and continued to do business until it went bankrupt in 1990.

== Description ==
At the time Freeman designed the bank, he had already acquired a reputation as a leading exponent of the Richardsonian Romanesque style. In 1893 however, the World's Columbian Exposition in Chicago was held, which showcased the neoclassical style. Like many other American architects of the day, Freeman was quick to adapt, and the Brooklyn Savings Bank would become one of his first neoclassical designs. In spite of his relative inexperience with the style, the bank has been cited as perhaps Freeman's finest work.

The building was constructed mainly of granite, from Hallowell, Maine. The main entrance, on the Clinton St. side, featured a "grand recessed porch", 20 by 25 feet in size, containing a bold Roman arch flanked by red granite columns. On the entablature above the arch was emblazoned the name of the bank, while on the cornice at each side was carved the date of the bank's incorporation (1827), and the date construction was begun on the building (1892). The porch itself was flanked by two large circular windows, and surmounted by a shallow balcony onto which opened three more rectangular windows. There was also an entrance at 300 Fulton Street (now Cadman Plaza West).

The Pierrepont St. side featured a tall, central loggia, topped by a triangular pediment supported by columns, and flanked by a pair of transepts with stained glass windows, in which the private offices of the bank were located. Above the loggia, running around the walls about two thirds of the way up on each side of the building, was a large cornice moulding of dark stone, above which ran a row of rectangular windows, highlighted at each end by a circular window with a decorative border. The roof was gabled and tiled, and sloped away from the walls on every side. The exterior as a whole is described as having had a "mausoleum-like magnificence".

The interior of the bank is said to have been equally impressive. The main banking room featured a lofty, 75-foot high ceiling—a recent innovation in bank architecture that traded efficient use of space for visual impact. The ceiling itself featured a large rectangular dome and clerestory, supported by eight Ionic columns of Numidian marble. The bank's walls were panelled with onyx to a height of 22 feet, and the counters finished in onyx and bronze. A mezzanine floor was used to house the bank's records, below which was situated "an immense fire and burglar-proof vault".

The Brooklyn Savings Bank is said to have been "the first and foremost example of neoclassic architecture in Brooklyn Heights". Its demolition has accordingly been lamented as "among the great landmark losses in New York history".

== Bibliography ==
- Lancaster, Clay; Gillon, Edmund V. Jr. (1980): Old Brooklyn Heights: New York's First Suburb, Dover Publications, 5th Edition, ISBN 978-0-486-23872-2.
- Morrone, Francis; Iska, James (2001): An Architectural Guidebook to Brooklyn, Gibbs Smith, ISBN 978-1-58685-047-0.
