= Brooklyn Waterworks =

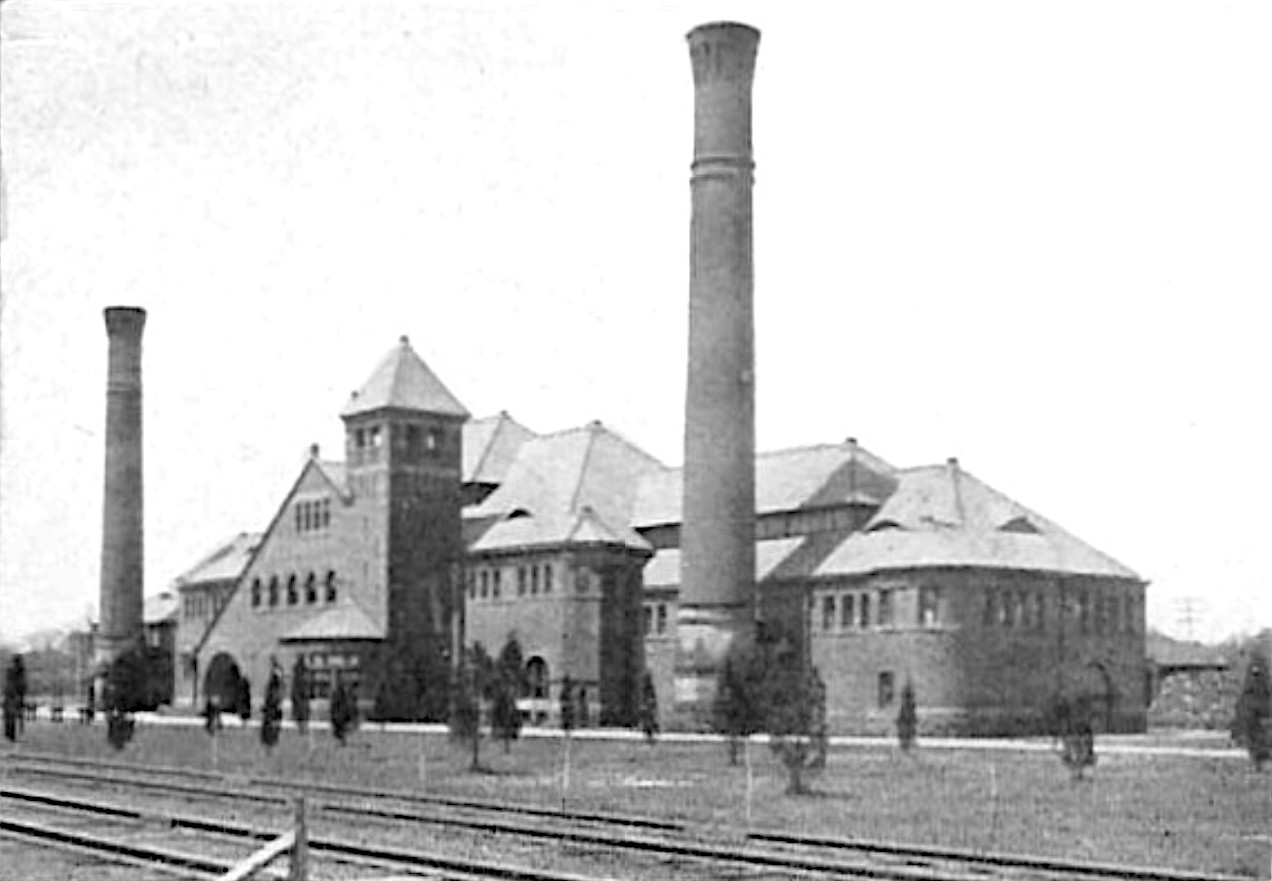
- Brooklyn Waterworks, ca. 1912
- Interactive map of the Brooklyn Waterworks area
- Alternative names: Milburn Pumping Station

General information
- Type: Industrial
- Architectural style: Richardsonian Romanesque
- Location: Freeport, Long Island
- Coordinates: 40.6571°N 73.602°W
- Completed: 1891
- Renovated: Partially, 1989
- Destroyed: By fire, 1990s, remnant facade and elements demolished 2010
- Owner: Gary Melius

Height
- Height: 3 stories

Design and construction
- Architect: Frank Freeman

The Brooklyn Waterworks, also known as the Milburn Pumping Station, was a historic building in Freeport, Long Island. Designed by noted Brooklyn architect Frank Freeman and completed in 1890, it was described as "Long Island's most ambitious Romanesque Revival design."

After the Waterworks was decommissioned in the 1970s, it was purchased in 1989 by a property developer who planned to convert it into apartments. During the renovation however, the building was severely damaged by fire. Attempts to redevelop what remains of the structure have since met with failure due to legal disputes.

== History ==
In the 1880s, the then City of Brooklyn acquired Milburn Pond in Freeport to feed the Ridgewood Reservoir to serve Brooklyn's growing water needs. The pond was subsequently enlarged, and architect Frank Freeman engaged to design a new, larger pumping station. The new station, completed in 1891, housed five large steam pumps capable of delivering up to 54 million US gallons (200,000 m^{3}) a day.

In 1898, Brooklyn was absorbed into New York City, allowing the former access to the Croton Aqueduct system, and reducing demand for the Milburn supply. By 1929, the Milburn Pumping Station was downgraded to a standby supply, for operation only in emergencies, at which time the building's two large smokestacks were dismantled. The pumping station was retained as a standby supply until 1977, when the property was sold to Nassau County and the machinery removed. The property was thereafter allowed to fall into decay.

In 1989, the property was purchased at auction by a developer, Gary Mileus, for the sum of $1.4 million. Mileus set to work converting the building into 48 condominiums, a project set for completion in 1990. However, a housing market collapse put the project on hold, and the building was later severely damaged by a fire. Mileus then came up with a new proposal to convert what remained of the building into a nursing home, but this plan was eventually blocked by local government. In 2009, Mileus won a $3.5 million lawsuit relating to ownership of the property from the Village of Freeport, with further lawsuits pending. Mileus estimates that prior to the 2009 lawsuit, he had lost $12 million on the property.

As of August 2010, most of what was standing had been demolished, and as of 2019, nothing remains of the structure. It is now renatured land as part of the Brookside Preserve.

== Description ==
The Brooklyn Waterworks has been described as "unquestionably Long Island's most ambitious Romanesque Revival design." The "monumental" building was constructed of "deep red" brick, and included towers, large arched windows, eyebrow dormers and a bold Roman arch for the main entrance. The walls featured a "lavish" level of carved brick and terra cotta ornamentation.

The interior of the building included a main room finished in two shades of orange brick. The roof was supported by a spacious pin truss, while an "elaborate" iron walkway ran around the walls, encircling the five giant steam pumps.

== Reservoirs in the system ==
Brooklyn has had many water reservoirs; they can be seen on an 1864 map of the Brooklyn Waterworks. They are listed below, from east to west:

1. Hempstead Reservoir
2. Smith's Pond
3. Rockville Reservoir
4. Valley Stream Pond
5. Watts Pond
6. Clear Stream Reservoir
7. Brookfield Reservoir
8. Conselyea Pond
9. P. Cornells Pond
10. Springfield Pond
11. One Mile Pond
12. Jamaica Reservoir
13. Ridgewood Reservoir
14. Mount Prospect Reservoir

== Bibliography ==
- American Institute of Architects (1992): AIA Architectural Guide to Nassau and Suffolk Counties, Long Island, Dover Publications, ISBN 978-0-486-26946-7.
