= Frank Freeman (architect) =

Canadian-American architect

- Born: 1861; Hamilton, Canada West
- Died: October 13, 1949 (aged 88); Montclair, New Jersey
- Occupation: Architect
- Buildings: See § List of works

Frank Freeman (1861 – 13 October 1949) was a Canadian-American architect based in Brooklyn, New York. A leading exponent of the Richardsonian Romanesque architectural style who later adopted Neoclassicism, Freeman has been called "Brooklyn's greatest architect". Many details of his life and work are however still unknown, and Freeman himself has received little recognition outside academia. Many of his works have been demolished or otherwise destroyed, but most of those that remain have received New York City landmark status, either independently or as part of larger historic districts.

== Life and career ==
Freeman was born in Hamilton, Canada West, in 1861. In the early 1880s, he arrived in New York, where he obtained a minor position in an architect's office while studying architecture. By 1885 he was a qualified architect, and in 1887 he established his own practice. Almost immediately he began attracting major commissions, one of the first being for the Hotel Margaret in 1888.

Freeman maintained offices in both Brooklyn and New York City, the latter in the Sun Building at 280 Broadway. While he designed buildings for clients in both Manhattan and Long Island and occasionally further afield, the great majority of his works were constructed in Brooklyn.

Freeman's early work was completed in the Richardsonian Romanesque style, at which he is considered a master. After the Chicago World's Fair in 1893 however, Romanesque went out of fashion and Freeman quickly adapted to the new Neoclassical trend, completing a major commission in the genre, the Brooklyn Savings Bank, even before the World's Fair had ended. Freeman also sometimes incorporated elements of other styles into his works, such as Italian Renaissance, Beaux Arts and Colonial Revival, in an eclectic manner.

Freeman once headed the Clubhouse Committee of the Crescent Athletic Club (whose headquarters he designed in 1906), and he was a parishioner of Holy Trinity Episcopal Church in Brooklyn Heights. He died in 1949 in a convalescent home in Montclair, New Jersey at the age of 88, after a long illness. He was survived by two daughters, Miss Katharine C. Freeman and Mrs Dorothea F. Sellew.

Freeman's family discarded his papers and records just days before architectural historian Alan Burnham arrived to request them. Historians have thus been obliged to try to piece together details of his career from municipal records, a task that was still ongoing as late as 1995.

== Critical appraisal ==
Freeman's work has received high praise from architecture critics, most notably from Norval White who called him "Brooklyn's greatest architect"—an accolade frequently repeated, and that other critics have judged as not unreasonable. His work in the Richardsonian Romanesque style in particular has been singled out for attention. The 19th century critic Montgomery Schuyler credited him with "the most artistic examples of the Richardsonian Romanesque in our domestic architecture", while a 1979 report by the New York City Landmarks Preservation Commission described his works in this style to be "among the finest built anywhere in New York City." He has been praised for his "fecund imagination" and "infinite versatility"—an example of the latter being his Brooklyn Savings Bank, a neoclassical design, considered by critic Francis Morrone to have been perhaps Freeman's finest work.

More generally, Freeman's "marvellously clear and direct" buildings "seem to speak to people, he gave them a sense of immediacy", according to historian Andrew Dolkart. Dolkart asserts that had Freeman practiced in Manhattan, "he'd be famous; but just because he worked in Brooklyn, no one's ever heard of him." Though Freeman was known to have been a prolific architect, many of his buildings have been demolished or destroyed, which further contributed to his lack of recognition. Furthermore, Dolkart told The New York Times in 1996 that it was difficult to find documentation for Freeman's buildings, due to the fragmented nature of Brooklyn building records. Many of Freeman's surviving works are now protected by landmark status.

== List of works ==
The following tables list buildings known to have been designed by Frank Freeman. The first table is a list of extant works; the second a list of works that have been demolished or otherwise largely or wholly destroyed. Both lists are incomplete.

=== Buildings that still exist ===
Image	Name	Address	Built	Style	Notes
	Herman Behr Mansion	82 Pierrepont St., Brooklyn	1889	RR	"the city's finest Romanesque Revival house"
	Brooklyn Fire Headquarters	365-367 Jay St., Brooklyn	1892	RR	"the most splendid neighborhood firehouse in Greater New York."
	Eagle Warehouse	28 Fulton St., Brooklyn	1894	RR	"...a medieval brick fortress [that] recalls the Palazzo Vecchio in Florence,"
	Nelson P. Lewis Residence	1511 Albemarle Rd., Brooklyn	1899	CR	Part of the Prospect Park South Historic District.
	Crescent Athletic Club House	129 Pierrepont St., Brooklyn	1906	N	"at first seems simple enough but is in fact quite complex."
	Brooklyn Union Gas Company Headquarters	180 Remsen St., Brooklyn	1914	N	"a fine, stately office building demonstrating Freeman's infinite versatility."
	Harriet Judson YWCA	50 Nevins St., Brooklyn	1914	CR	
	Villa Maria	615 Montauk Hwy, Water Mill	1919 (R)	E	"perhaps Water Mill's best-known landmark."

Legend: Name=name of building; Address=address of building; Built=year building was completed (or remodelled, denoted by an "R" after the year); Style=architectural style. Styles include: RR=Richardsonian Romanesque; N=Neoclassical; E=eclectic; CR=Colonial Revival.

=== Buildings that no longer exist ===
Image	Name	Address	Built	Style	Notes
	Hotel Margaret	97 Columbia Heights, Brooklyn	1889	RR	"the outstanding building of the Post-Civil War period" in Brooklyn Heights. Destroyed by fire during renovations, 1980.
	Germania Club House	120 Schermerhorn St., Brooklyn	1890	RR	"As a specimen of Romanesque architecture, it is unsurpassed by any other structure in Brooklyn". Demolished 1920s to make way for a subway.
	Thomas Jefferson Association Building	Boerum Place, Brooklyn	1890	RR	"one of the most peculiar-looking structures in the city." Demolished to make way for an arterial link, 1960.
	Brooklyn Waterworks	Freeport, Long Island	1890	RR	"unquestionably Long Island's most ambitious Romanesque Revival design." Burned down during renovations, 1990s. The remaining facades and walls were torn down in September 2010.
	Bushwick Democratic Club House	719 Bushwick Ave., Brooklyn	1892	RR	An "astounding, round-edged cube ... wrap[ping] a tight skin of precise decoration around a compact mass", Destroyed by fire, after 1970.
	Edward Mandell House Mansion	1704 West Avenue, Austin, Texas	1892		Built for Edward Mandell House. Demolished 1967.
	Brooklyn Savings Bank		1894	N	"may have been Freeman's finest work." Demolished 1964.
	Frederick Burrell Residence	1401 Albemarle Rd., Brooklyn	1900	n/a	"one of the finest of the modern dwellings in the ... exclusive section south of Prospect Park". Demolished 1938.

Legend: Name=name of building; Address=address of building; Built=year building was completed (or remodelled, denoted by an "R" after the year); Style=architectural style. Styles include: RR=Richardsonian Romanesque; N=Neoclassical; E=eclectic; CR=Colonial Revival.

== Bibliography ==
- American Institute of Architects (1992): AIA Architectural Guide to Nassau and Suffolk Counties, Long Island, Dover Publications, ISBN 978-0-486-26946-7.
- Howard, Henry W. B.; Jervis, Arthur N. (1893): The Eagle and Brooklyn: The Record of the Progress of the Brooklyn Daily Eagle, Volume 2, The Brooklyn Daily Eagle.
- Lancaster, Clay; Gillon, Edmund V. Jr. (1980): Old Brooklyn Heights: New York's First Suburb, 5th Edition, Dover Publications, ISBN 978-0-486-23872-2.
- Morrone, Francis; Iska, James (2001): An Architectural Guidebook to Brooklyn, Gibbs Smith, ISBN 978-1-58685-047-0.
