= Herman Behr Mansion =

Residence in Brooklyn, New York

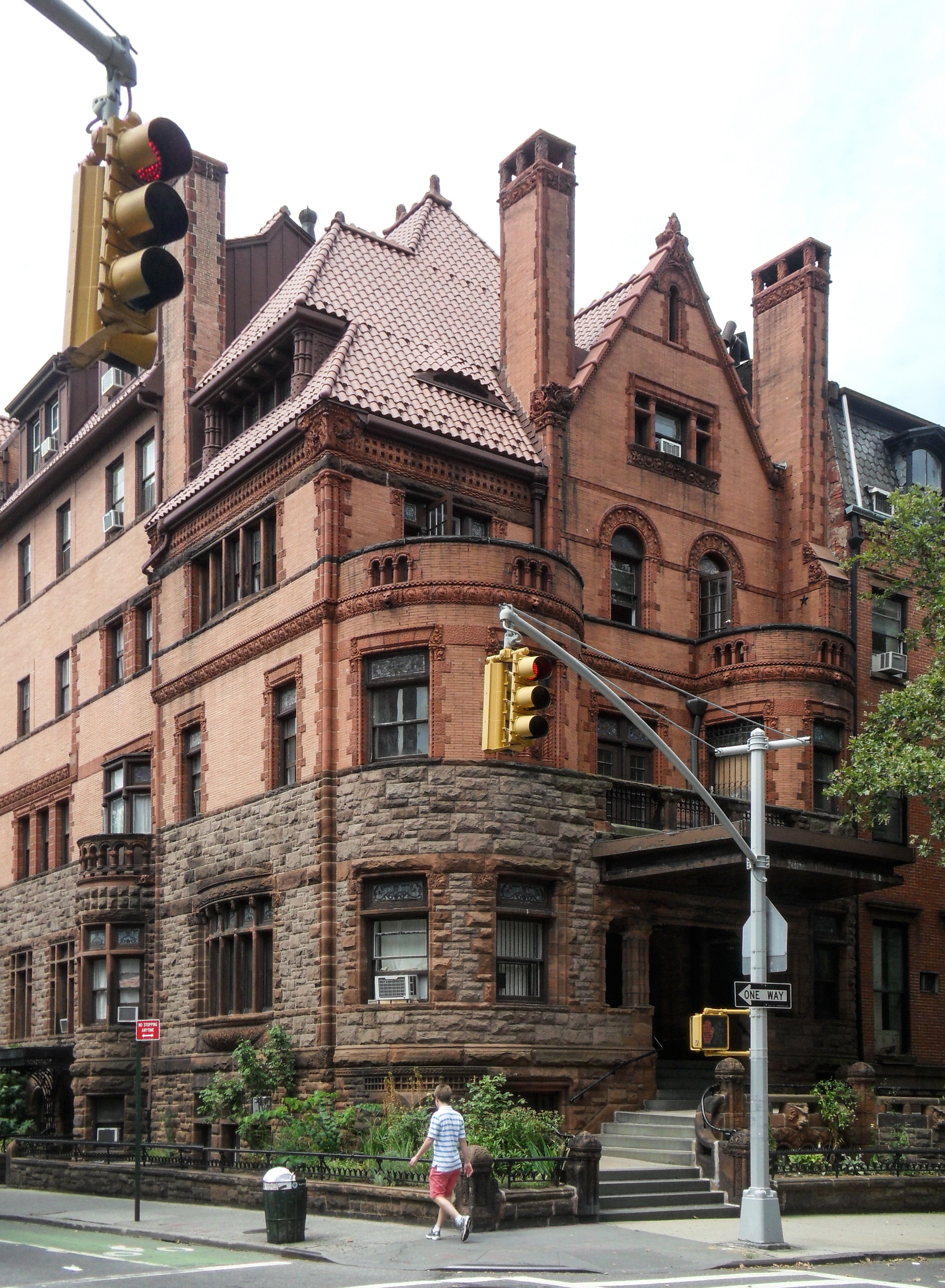
- Front (Pierrepont St.) view of the mansion. The rectangular canopy over the entrance is a modern addition.
- Interactive map of the Herman Behr Mansion area
- Former names: Hotel Palm

General information
- Architectural style: Richardsonian Romanesque
- Location: 82 Pierrepont Street; Brooklyn, New York City
- Coordinates: 40°41′43.3″N 73°59′39″W
- Construction started: 1888
- Completed: 1889
- Renovated: 1919, 1977
- Cost: $80,000

Height
- Height: 6 stories (originally 4)

Dimensions
- Other dimensions: 32 x 60 feet (original)

Design and construction
- Architect: Frank Freeman

The Herman Behr Mansion is a building at 82 Pierrepont Street, at the corner of Henry Street, in the Brooklyn Heights neighborhood of Brooklyn in New York City. Constructed in 1888–89 to a design by architect Frank Freeman, it has been described as "the city's finest Romanesque Revival house".

== History ==
The mansion was designed by leading Brooklyn architect Frank Freeman for industrialist Herman Behr, an abrasives manufacturer and the father of tennis player Karl Behr and golfer Max Behr. The Behr family eventually moved upstate, and in 1919 the Behr mansion was substantially expanded and became the Palm Hotel. The family's fortune was wiped out in the course of the Great Depression of 1929 and they lost the house, which became a brothel in its declining years.

The house became a residence of the Franciscan Brothers of Brooklyn in 1961, in conjunction with their operation of St. Francis College. It was sold and converted into rental apartments in 1977. In 2008, the building exchanged hands for $10,980,000.

The story that Xaviera Hollander's brothel was in the Behr House is an urban legend. It was in an apartment building at 73rd Street and York Avenue, according to her book, The Happy Hooker.

== Description ==
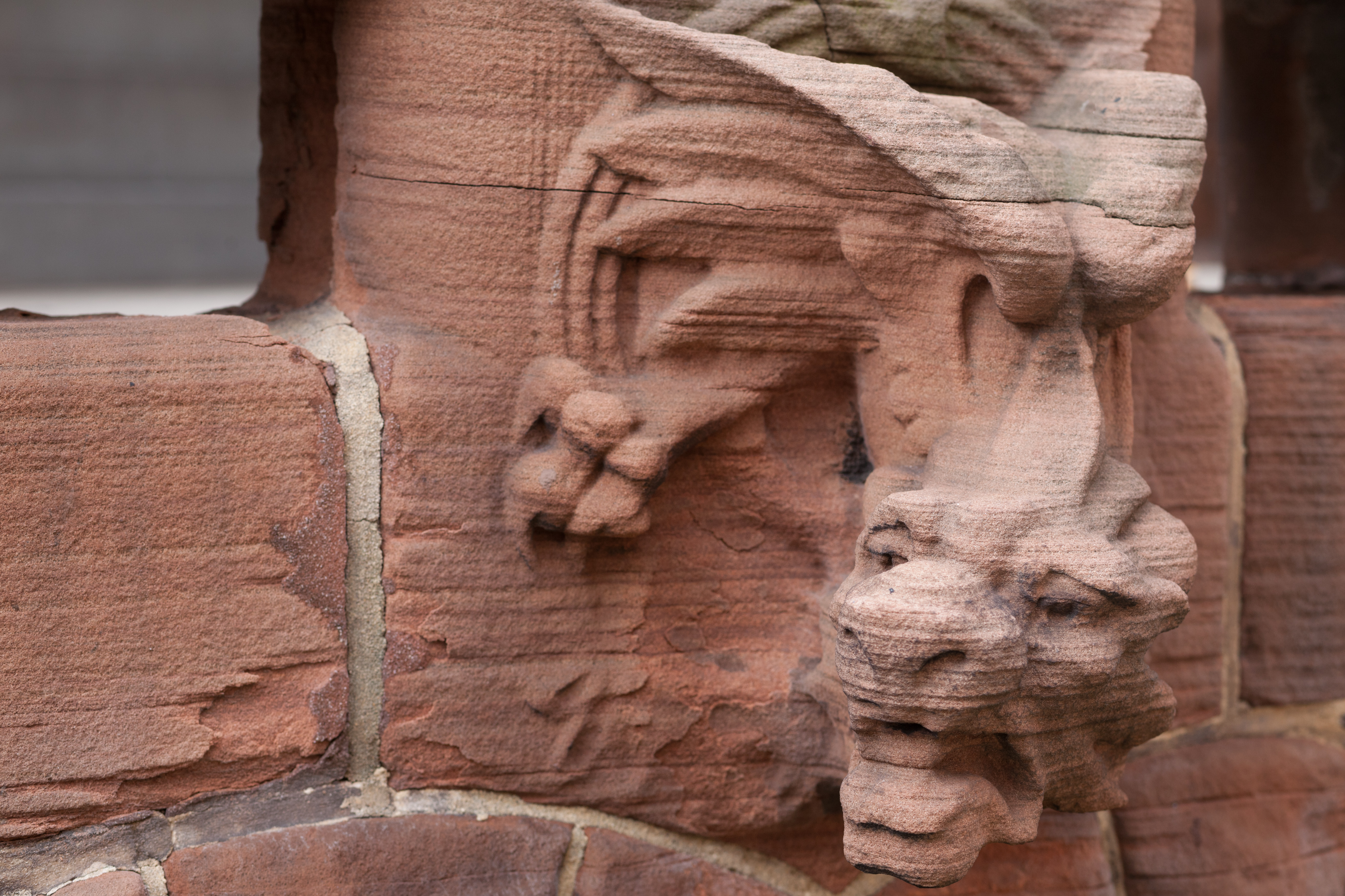
One of the sandstone dragons at street level on the Herman Behr Mansion

Architectural critics have hailed the Herman Behr Mansion as "the city's finest Romanesque Revival house" and "one of the great masterpieces of Romanesque Revival design in New York City." It has been described as "one of the real treats of Brooklyn Heights, a Romanesque color-fantasy of salmon brick, terra cotta and rockfaced sandstone with crazy animal ornament reminiscent of modern, violent comic books -- grimacing lizards, lions and dragons."

The house was originally three stories high, not including the basement and attic. A six-story extension, not much higher than the original building, was added to the rear of the property in 1919 when it became the Palm Hotel.

The first floor of the mansion is finished in undressed sandstone, with the exception of the 1919 extension. The rest of the exterior is constructed of Belleville brownstone with a brick terra cotta facing. The entrance is accessed by a broad stone staircase, flanked by two semicircular towers or bays which rise to the height of the third floor where they each form a separate balcony. A third balcony on the second floor runs between the two. Each of the bays features three large bay windows per floor. Above and between the bays, on the third floor, are two semicircular windows, surmounted by a single rectangular window in a gable, which in turn is flanked by two tall chimneys. The roof itself is steeply sloped, gabled and tiled. The bays at the front of the building are echoed by a third, smaller ground floor bay in the center of the building in Henry Street.

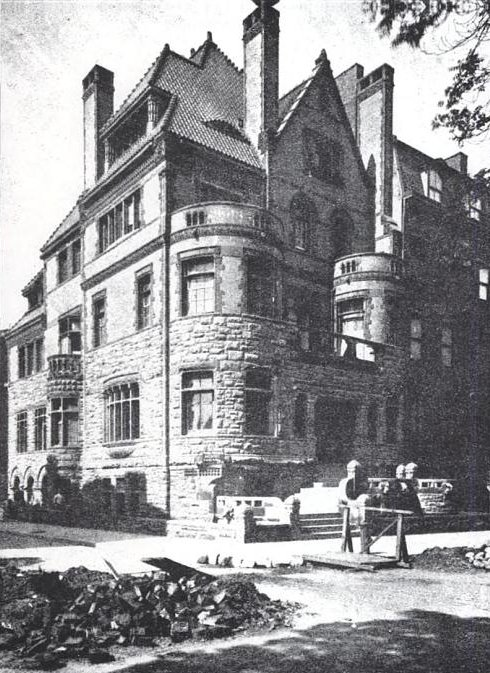
The mansion shortly after completion, c.1889

The entranceway opens upon a lobby finished in mahogany and containing a small library and a fireplace of Scotch sandstone with an "intricately carved" mantelpiece. In the building's original layout, to the right of the lobby lay a large drawing room, two thirds of the building deep, finished in polished mahogany, with a panelled ceiling of white and gold. To the rear of the drawing room, separated by sliding doors, was the dining room, finished in oak and with a red Numidian marble fireplace with a carved oak mantelpiece. The library, which directly faced the building's entrance, was finished in cherrywood, with a domed roof of white and gold, the latter color predominating.

To the left of the entrance, running the length of the building on the Henry St. side, was the parlor, culminating at the rear in the servants' dressing room, pantries, and a staircase leading to the kitchen in the basement. The basement level also included a billiard room, butler's room, servants' sittingroom and laundry. The second floor contained bedrooms, a dressing room and bathroom. The woodwork in the bedrooms was finished in enamelled ivory, and the mantels in onyx. The third floor contained a chamber hall and several smaller rooms. In the attic was a studio, storage space and servants' quarters.
