= Political club =

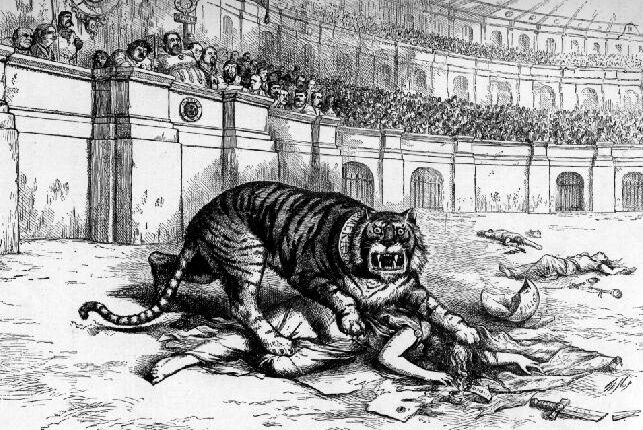
Thomas Nast illustrated Tammany Hall as a ferocious tiger killing democracy

The political club is a membership based organization. Membership of a political club is an outward show of political allegiance.

== Victorian England ==
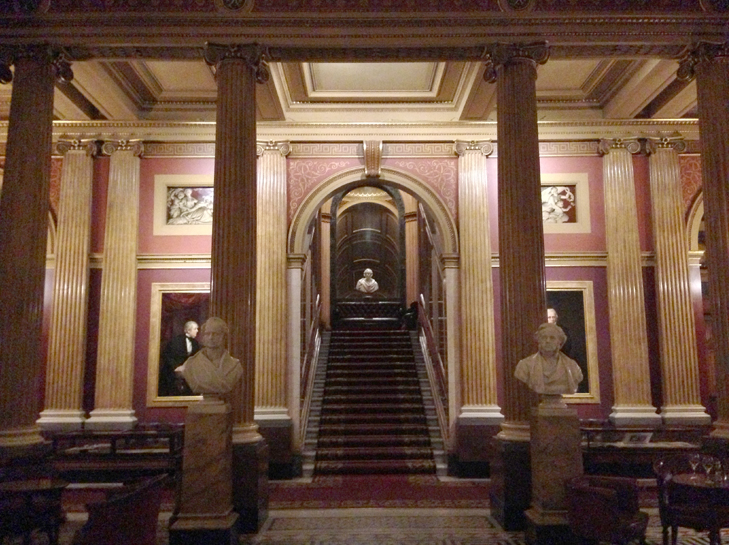
The Reform Club's italianate Saloon (stairs leading to the Gallery)

In the Victorian era the political club was synonymous with a political party. Parliamentarians therefore had to publicly say whether they are acting as a member of a political club or as a member of a political party. Notable political clubs that existed already back then include the Brooks's, and the Reform Club.

== Urban politics in the United States ==
The political club is a feature of urban politics in the United States usually representing a particular party in a neighbourhood. They were most prominent in the later 19th and early 20th centuries, most famously in Tammany Hall of New York City, which adopted them during the golden age of fraternalism in reaction to a strong challenge from the United Labor Party in 1886. Political clubs were associated with political machines and political boss culture, but also often saw a split between "regular" and "reform" political factions. They formerly often had a prominent local meeting house, but have declined since politics became less neighborhood-based.
