= Historic Districts Council =

American nonprofit organization

Historic Districts Council (HDC)
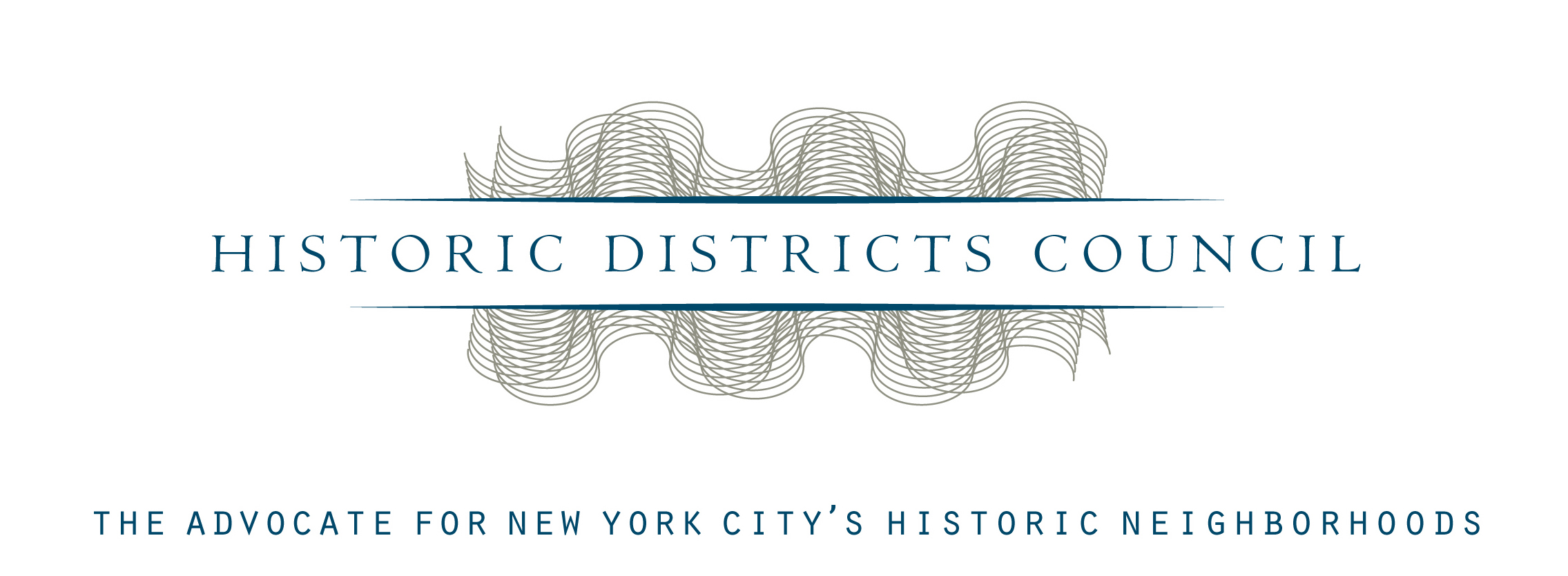
- Established: 1970; 56 years ago
- Location(s): 232 East 11th Street, New York, New York, U.S.
- Services: Historic Preservation
- Website: www.hdc.org

The Historic Districts Council (HDC) is a New York City-based 501(c)(3) nonprofit organization that serves as the advocate for New York City's historic buildings, neighborhoods, and public spaces. HDC's YouTube channel provides a large catalog of free walking tour videos, Preservation School classes, conference panels, and other educational programming.

== History ==
HDC was founded in 1970 as a committee of the Municipal Art Society consisting of a coalition of community groups from the designated historic districts of New York City (of which there were then only 14), to serve as their representative, and to advocate for more support for the newly created Landmarks Preservation Commission. In the late 1970s, its focus shifted as it began to advocate for the designation of additional historic districts.

In 1985, HDC became an independent, incorporated organization with its own officers. HDC hired its first full-time executive director in 1992.

HDC's offices are located in the former rectory of St. Mark's Church in-the-Bowery, at 232 East 11th Street, in the East Village neighborhood of Manhattan in New York City. The organization shares space with the Greenwich Village Society for Historic Preservation.

Frampton Tolbert is the executive director.

== Advocacy ==
In New York City, HDC is the only advocate for designated historic districts and for neighborhoods meriting preservation in all five boroughs. HDC organizes neighborhood residents in their efforts to gain protection for their communities, assists property owners through the Landmarks Preservation Commission's processes, and monitors preserved properties. HDC also helps promote historic districts and holds annual conferences on topics related to preservation.

HDC is an independent, private organization, although it works with the city government, other preservation organizations, and individual neighborhood groups. As an advocate for New York's over 150 designated historic districts, HDC advises community groups about preservation issues and consults with building owners about what Landmarks Preservation Commission regulations mean. HDC is the only organization in the city that covers all applications.

As an advocate for neighborhoods not designated but meriting protection, HDC advises community groups that come to it because they are seeking historic designation. An HDC staff member meets with them in their neighborhoods to talk about what designation means and advises them on how to proceed. They then make concrete suggestions and then counsel groups on how to apply for designation, on what kind of research is necessary and how to get it done. HDC always stresses the importance of community support and helps local groups obtain it. Sometimes HDC initiates the designation process itself, usually in nonresidential areas that do not have local community leaders. In those cases, HDC sponsors the work that would otherwise be done by a community group. HDC also sponsors applications to New York State and National Registers of Historic Places. Listing on these Registers often helps move the designation process forward at the Landmarks Preservation Commission.

To preserve the integrity of the Landmarks Law, HDC monitors the behavior of city government and the LPC, taking issue with actions and policies when as they see needed. HDC testifies before the City Planning Commission, the Art Commission, the Board of Standards and Appeals and the City Council, usually on the effect a proposal would have on historic neighborhoods. Sometimes, the HDC holds public assemblies to gauge the effect of political elections.

== Landmarks Lion Award ==
Since 1990, the Historic Districts Council has bestowed the Landmarks Lion Award upon those who have shown unusual devotion and aggressiveness in protecting New York City's historic buildings and neighborhoods.

The Landmarks Lions include:

- Michael Hiller – 2024
- Michael Devonshire – 2023
- Frank E. Sanchis III – 2022
- Darren Walker and the Ford Foundation – 2021
- 50 Years of HDC – 2020
- Anne Van Ingen – 2019
- Boston Valley Terra Cotta, Friends of Terra Cotta, and Gladding, McBean – 2018
- Jeffrey Greene and EverGreene Architectural Arts – 2017
- Nancy Pearsall and Francis Morrone – 2016
- Pride of Lions – 2015
- Andrew Scott Dolkart – 2014
- Hugh & Tiziana Hardy – 2013
- Roberta Brandes Gratz – 2012
- Barbaralee Diamonstein–Spielvogel – 2011
- Robert A. M. Stern – 2010
- Rev. Dr. Thomas F. Pike – 2009
- Walter Melvin – 2008
- Lisa Ackerman – 2007
- Robert Silman – 2006
- Barry Lewis – 2005
- Beyer Blinder Belle Architects & Planners – 2004
- Kitty Carlisle Hart – 2003
- Kenneth K. Fisher – 2002
- Dorothy Miner – 2001
- Joyce Matz – 2000
- Anthony C. Wood – 1999
- Dr. James Marston Fitch – 1998
- Kent Barwick – 1997
- Edward S. Kirkland – 1996
- Joan K. Davidson – 1995
- Arlene Simon – 1994
- Otis Pratt Pearsall – 1994
- Margot Gayle – 1993
- Jack Taylor – 1992
- Halina Rosenthal – 1991
- Christabel Gough – 1990

== Funding ==
HDC's financing comes from grants by government entities such as the New York State Council on the Arts and the New York City Council; from private foundations, funds and corporations; from fund-raising events; and from individual donations. More than 700 Friends of HDC contribute on a regular basis and participate in its public activities.
