= Francis Morrone =

American architectural historian (born 1958)

Francis Morrone (born May 12, 1958) is an American architectural historian of Irish and Italian ancestry, originally from Chicago, known for his work on the built history of New York City.

Morrone's essays on architecture have appeared in The Wall Street Journal, City Journal, American Arts Quarterly, the New Criterion, Humanities, and The New York Times. He was a columnist for the New York Sun for six and a half years (2002-2008). In April 2011, Travel + Leisure named him as one of the 13 best tour guides in the world. Morrone was a 2012 recipient of the Arthur Ross Award from the Institute of Classical Architecture and Art, and a 2016 recipient of the Landmarks Lion Award from the Historic Districts Council. He teaches at New York University and is an authority on Edith Wharton. He is married to Patricia Rainsford and lives in Park Slope, Brooklyn.

== Books ==
- Guide to New York City Urban Landscapes
- An Architectural Guidebook to Brooklyn
- The Architectural Guidebook to New York City
- An Architectural Guidebook to Philadelphia
- Brooklyn: A Journey through the City of Dreams
- The Municipal Art Society of New York: 10 Architectural Walks in Manhattan
- New York: Memories of Times Past
- The New York Public Library: The Architecture and Decoration of the Stephen A. Schwarzman Building
- The Park Slope Neighborhood and Architectural History Guide
- The Fort Greene/Clinton Hill Neighborhood and Architectural History Guide
- New York City Landmarks
