= Chapin =

Chapin may refer to:

== Places ==
=== United States ===
- Chapin, Idaho, an unincorporated community
- Chapin, Illinois, a village
- Chapin, Iowa, an unincorporated community
- Chapin Township, Michigan
- Chapin, Missouri, an unincorporated community
- Chapin, New York
- Chapin, South Carolina, a town
- Edinburg, Texas or Chapin
- Chapin, Wisconsin, an unincorporated community

=== Elsewhere ===
- Chapni or Chapin, Armenia
- Chapin Peak, Wilkes Land, Antarctica

== People ==
- Chapin (surname)
- Chapin (given name)
- Chapin, regional demonym for people from Guatemala

== Schools ==
- Chapin School, a school in New York
- Chapin School (New Jersey)
- Chapin High School, a public high school in South Carolina
- Captain John L. Chapin High School, a public high school in Texas

== Other uses ==
- Chapin Block, Southbridge, Massachusetts, on the US National Register of Historic Places
- Chapin National Bank Building, Springfield, Massachusetts, on the US National Register of Historic Places
- Chapin Memorial Church, Oneonta, New York, on the US National Register of Historic Places
- Mount Chapin, a summit in Colorado

== See also ==
- Chapin Sisters, a US female singing group
