= Unity Temple =

Church in Oak Park, Illinois, US

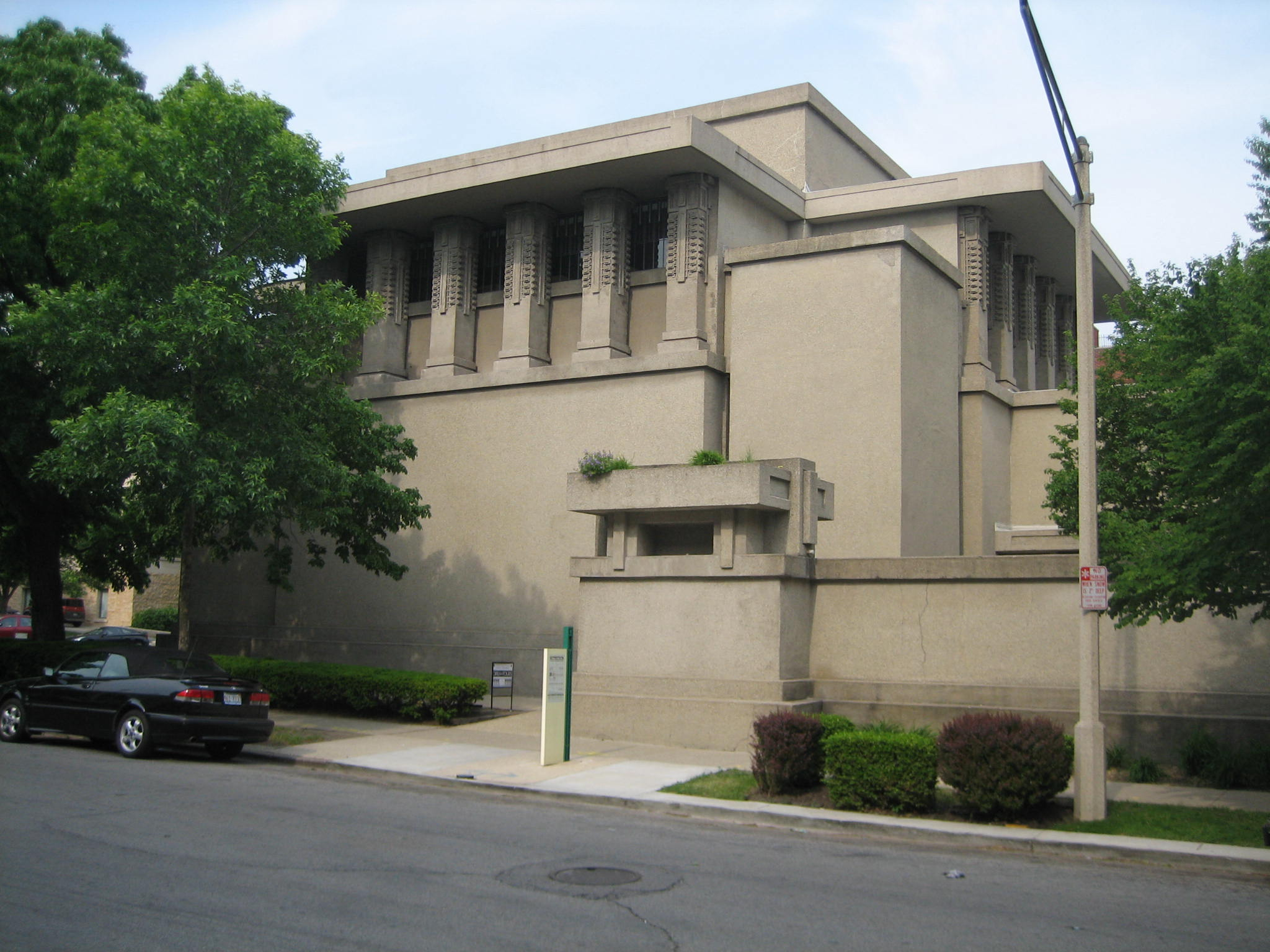

- Location within Chicago metropolitan area Location within Illinois Location within the United States
- 41°53′17″N 87°47′49″W
- Location: 875 Lake Street; Oak Park, Illinois

History
- Built: 1905–1908

Site notes
- Area: 0.5 acres (0.20 ha)
- Architect: Frank Lloyd Wright
- Architectural styles: Prairie style; Modern
- Governing body: Private

UNESCO World Heritage Site
- Criteria: Cultural: (ii)
- Designated: 2019 (43rd session)
- Part of: The 20th-Century Architecture of Frank Lloyd Wright
- Reference no.: 1496-001
- Region: North America

U.S. National Register of Historic Places
- Designated: April 17, 1970
- Reference no.: 70000240

U.S. National Historic Landmark
- Designated: December 30, 1970

U.S. Historic district – Contributing property
- Designated: December 8, 1983
- Part of: Ridgeland–Oak Park Historic District
- Reference no.: 83003564

Unity Temple is a Unitarian Universalist church building that houses the Unity Temple Unitarian Universalist Congregation at 875 Lake Street in Oak Park, Illinois, United States. The structure, designed by the architect Frank Lloyd Wright in the Prairie style, is cited as an early example of modern architecture. The building consists of an auditorium to the north and a church house called Unity House to the south. The two sections, and an entrance pavilion between them, are made of reinforced concrete.

The congregation was formed as the Unity Church of Oak Park in 1871. It originally occupied a Gothic Revival building and went through several pastors in its first two decades. Rodney Johonnot, who became the senior pastor in 1892, began planning a replacement structure in the early 1900s. After the original church burned down in 1905, the board of trustees selected a site on Lake Street and hired Wright to design a new building, Unity Temple. Wright's plans were approved in 1906 after much debate, and construction began on May 15 of that year. After various delays, Unity House opened in September 1907, and the auditorium was finished in October 1908; the church was dedicated on September 26, 1909. Over the years, the temple attracted visitors from around the U.S. and the world. The church was restored in the 1960s, and it gradually underwent further upgrades from the 1970s to the 2000s. Unity Temple was completely refurbished from 2015 to 2017.

The temple is decorated with abstract motifs instead of overtly religious imagery. The facade is made of Portland cement, which has been washed away to expose the gravel underneath; there are recessed clerestory windows near the top. Unlike contemporary churches, Unity Temple was designed without a spire; instead, the roof consists of multiple flat, overhanging concrete slabs. The auditorium is shaped like a Greek cross, with stair towers at each corner. It has two levels of seating surrounding a central pulpit, in addition to clerestories and skylights. Unity House has skylights and two balconies.

Unity Temple has received extensive architectural commentary over the years, and it has been the subject of many media works, including books and museum exhibits. Its design is credited with having helped inspire multiple architects. Unity Temple is designated as a National Historic Landmark and is part of The 20th-Century Architecture of Frank Lloyd Wright, a World Heritage Site.

== Early history ==
Eleven members of the Union Church—a liberal Protestant congregation in Oak Park, a village in the suburbs of Chicago, Illinois—met on January 25, 1871, to discuss the formation of a new congregation. E. W. Hoard hosted a meeting to raise money for a church building, collecting more than $5,000. (Note: Equivalent to $116,000 in 2024 (Note: Johnston, Louis; Williamson, Samuel H. (2023). "What Was the U.S. GDP Then?". MeasuringWorth. United States Gross Domestic Product deflator figures follow the MeasuringWorth series.)) Unity Church of Oak Park, a non-denominational church, was formed that March. The congregation acquired land at the southwest corner of Wisconsin Avenue (later Pleasant Street) and Marion Street, south of the Union Pacific West railroad line, from Milton C. Niles. The treasurer, Edwin O. Gale, provided $5,600, or nearly half of the $13,689 cost. (Note: The total cost is equivalent to $319,000, of which Gale provided $130,000.) It is unknown who designed the original church, which was built in the Gothic Revival style. The original church was a 40-by-80-foot (12 by 24 m) rectangle topped by a 125-foot (38 m) spire. Inside was a ground-level parish hall with an auditorium above it; a Chicago Tribune article from 1872 described the church as having a stone foundation and wood frame. Within the auditorium was a raised pulpit and rows of seats bisected by a central aisle.

Work on the new church began in early 1871, and the basement was finished later that year. A consecration ceremony was held on August 11, 1872. In its early years, the congregation was composed of Universalists and Unitarians. As such, the church went through several pastors in its first decade. In 1882, some of the congregation's Universalist members formed a sub-congregation affiliated with the Universalist Church of America; the congregation at large remained unaffiliated with any denomination. After going through six pastors in fifteen years, the church selected Augusta Jane Chapin as its pastor in 1886. During Chapin's tenure, Anna Jones Wright, the mother of the architect Frank Lloyd Wright, joined the congregation.

Chapin left the congregation in December 1891, and Rodney Johonnot became the senior pastor the next year. During Johonnot's first four years, the congregation grew to 225 members. A church organ was installed in 1897. The congregation had decided to build a new structure by March 1901, when members voted to establish a fund for the construction of a new temple. Johonnot felt that the existing building could not accommodate all of the congregation's activities. The congregation hired H. P. Harned to design a new structure on the existing site, south of the railroad tracks. By then, numerous churches were being built in Oak Park, and many of the newer churches were being built on Lake Street, north of the tracks. In December 1904, the board of trustees again asked the congregation for donations for a new temple. Following a meeting in May 1905, a committee was appointed to discuss plans for the new building.

== Temple development ==
The original Unity Church was destroyed on June 4, 1905, when a lightning strike started a blaze; firefighters were unable to extinguish the flames because of low water pressure. The fire caused about $20,000 in damage (Note: Equivalent to $540,000 in 2024) and destroyed everything except for the piano, chairs, paintings, dishes, and utensils. Within one week, the congregation had appointed four committees to oversee fundraising, site selection, design, and construction. In the meantime, the congregation temporarily met at Nakama Hall. The nearby First Baptist Church also hosted some of the congregation's events.

=== Selection of site and architect ===
Initially, it was estimated that the new building would cost $50,000. (Note: Equivalent to $1,349,000 in 2024) The fundraising committee requested donations from various sources, while the site selection committee recommended that the new temple be built "in some place more central". At the time, two-thirds of the congregation lived south of Lake Street, and congregants favored a site near that street; only one person preferred to keep the existing site. The committee considered several locations throughout the village. Two of these sites were located at the intersection of Lake Street and Kenilworth Avenue: a private house on the southwestern corner, and a vacant lot owned by Gale on the southeastern corner. In early August 1905, the congregation paid Gale $10,000 or $11,000. (Note: Equivalent to between $270,000 and $297,000 in 2024) The tract measured 150 feet (46 m) along Kenilworth Avenue and either 100 feet (30 m) or 105 feet (32 m) along Lake Street. The site complemented the nearby First Presbyterian and Grace Episcopal churches slightly to the west.

When the site was selected, the congregation had raised $30,000 toward the new building, (Note: Equivalent to $810,000 in 2024) and they began searching for an architect shortly afterward. On August 30, the planning committee met with nine architects, selecting four finalists: Frank Lloyd Wright, Dwight H. Perkins, William Augustus Otis, and Normand Smith Patton. At their September meeting, Unity Church's board of trustees voted to allow the planning committee to select an architect. This person was to draw up plans for an edifice costing no more than $30,000. (Note: Equivalent to $810,000 in 2024)

Wright had been selected by mid-September. The engineer Charles E. Roberts, who led the church's building committee, had influenced the church's decision to select Wright. According to Wright, the board had considered hosting an architectural design competition (which he would have refused to join), but the historian Joseph Siry writes that there is no evidence that the board ever considered such a competition. Construction News reported that the temple would cost $35,000 and would be a one-story, brick-and-stone edifice. (Note: Equivalent to $944,000 in 2024) Though Wright may have considered using brick, this was never recorded in his plans. Wright instead proposed using concrete to save money, since, at the time, the church had only $45,000 on hand. (Note: Equivalent to $1,214,000 in 2024) The temple was the first public building that Wright designed by himself.

=== Design ===
==== Original plans ====
The trustees mandated that the new house of worship include a sanctuary for worship, a meeting room for secular events, and a classroom for the Sunday school. Furthermore, as Lake Street was a major street, Wright had to design a monumental building that would also fit the church's budget. Many of the original drawings have been lost or destroyed, but Wright extensively documented his thought process in his autobiography. Wright wrote that Johonnot had wanted a Mission-style building, and he avoided traditional church architecture, instead proposing to the planning committee a "temple to man ... in which to study man himself for his God's sake". In the early plans, the temple's northern wall was aligned with the house to the east (which was set back 40 feet (12 m) from Lake Street), and the north–south axis was aligned with the house to the south. Wright created physical drawings only after extensively refining the plans mentally. He also produced a plaster model of the temple, which he presented to the planning committee.

The entrance to the main sanctuary, known as the auditorium, was intentionally positioned away from the streetcar lines on Lake Street. Wright did not want to put the meeting room and Sunday school in the auditorium, as he felt that it would "spoil the simplicity of the room". Accordingly, these rooms were instead placed in a separate church house called Unity House, which was linked to the auditorium by a central entrance hall. Having decided upon the site layout, Wright next designed the cube-shaped auditorium. Some preliminary drawings for the auditorium still exist. These include Scheme A, which called for 388 seats facing a pulpit on the south wall, and the rejected Scheme B, which called for 478 seats facing the north wall.

==== Design changes ====
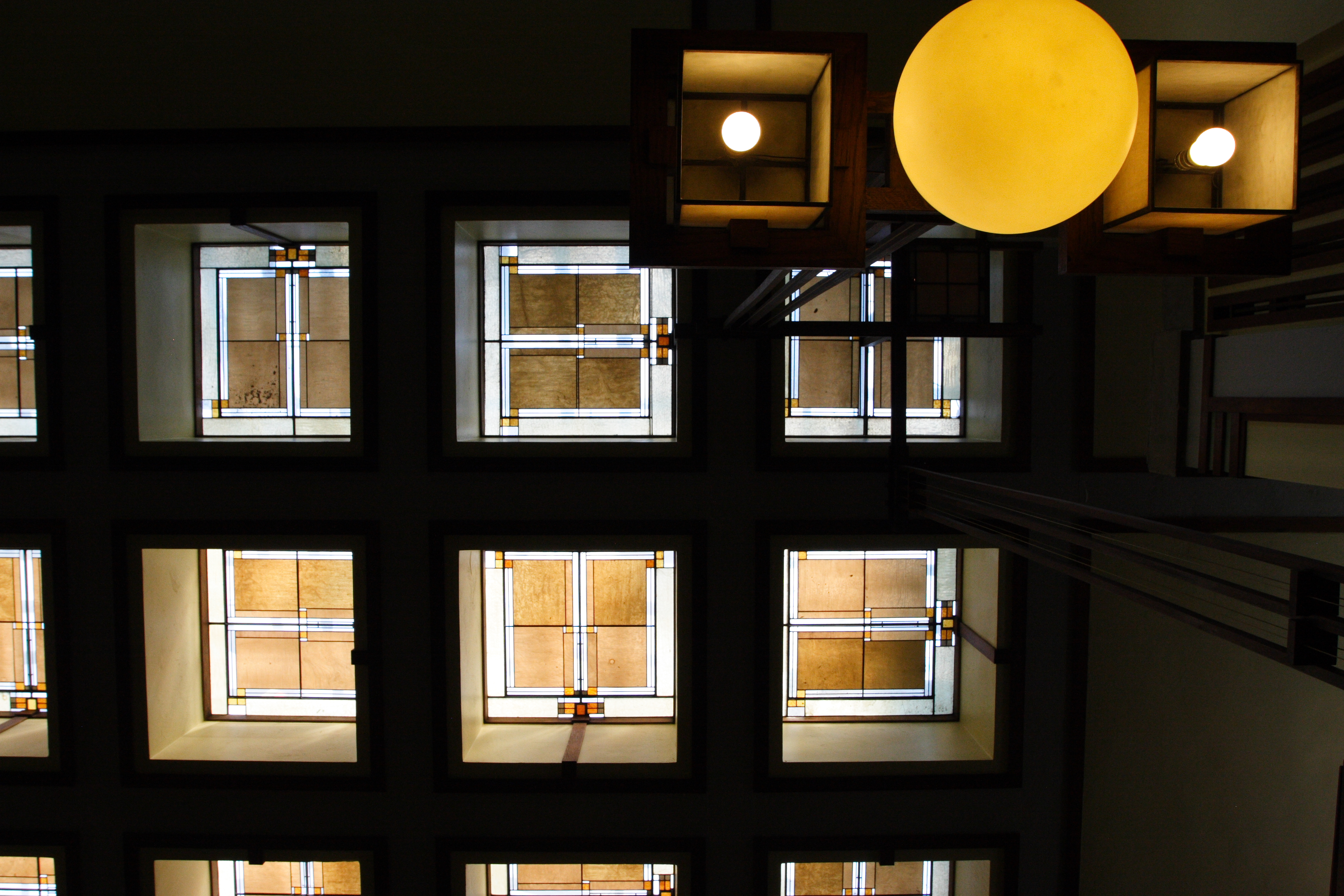
The auditorium's skylights

In December 1905, the planning committee received Wright's plans and recommended that the board of trustees approve them. The same month, Gale gave the congregation a 20-foot-wide (6.1 m) strip of land on Kenilworth Avenue. By the beginning of 1906, the site of the original building had been sold for $6,500. (Note: Equivalent to $175,000 in 2024) The congregation decided to proceed with construction, even though it had received only one bid for the general contract, which exceeded the church's budget by $8–10 thousand. (Note: Equivalent to $216–270 thousand in 2024) Thomas Skillin, who led the board of trustees, reported that the temple was to cost $40,000 but that there was only $31,000 available. (Note: The cost was equivalent to $1,079,000, while the money on hand was equivalent to $837,000 in 2024) The trustees considered modifying the plans, splitting work into two phases, or borrowing money. Wright offered to reduce the cost to $35,000 (Note: Equivalent to $944,000 in 2024) by revising the plans and deferring installation of the furnishings.

Skillin objected that the auditorium was too small and dark. At its meeting on January 18, 1906, the board asked Skillin and Johonnot to discuss possible modifications with Wright. Subsequently, Wright revised the auditorium's design, and he invited 75 members of the congregation to see the drawings and models for Unity Temple at his studio. The board approved Wright's revisions on February 7, on the condition that no more than $36,200 be spent. (Note: Equivalent to $977,000 in 2024) Details of the design were reported in the local media on February 24, and a brochure describing the final plan was published on March 4. Wright's assistant Charles E. White Jr. said the planning process had been marked by "endless fighting". Wright continued refining the design details even after the final plans were accepted and (in some cases) partially completed. Despite initial objections to Wright's design, Oak Park residents eventually came to like it.

=== Construction ===
==== Early construction ====
It took weeks to find a general contractor. Most of the bids that church officials did receive were significantly over budget, probably because of the unconventional nature of the concrete design, which drove many contractors away. Contractors found it difficult to decipher Wright's plans, which did not resemble standard blueprints. Paul Mueller, who had previously built Wright's E-Z Polish Factory and Larkin Administration Building, was ultimately selected as the contractor. Wright and Mueller began discussing the temple in January 1906, and Mueller was hired that April, having submitted a low bid of $32,221. (Note: Equivalent to $840,559.476 in 2024) The trustees agreed to pay Mueller $32,661 as long as Mueller paid a $15,000 bond, which would be refunded if the temple was completed on time. (Note: Mueller's payment is equivalent to $852,000, and his bond is equivalent to $391,000, in 2024) The board also approved a $1,243.23 builder's fee for Wright. (Note: Equivalent to $32,000 in 2024) A groundbreaking ceremony took place on May 15, 1906. One of Wright's draftsmen, Isabel Roberts, acted as a liaison to church officials, while Arthur Tobin coordinated the construction schedules.

The first part of the temple to be constructed was Unity House. Work on the foundation progressed slowly, and the building committee had to allocate another $645.60 for the foundations due to cost overruns. (Note: Equivalent to $17,000 in 2024) Mueller was also busy with other projects across the United States, which further delayed the temple's construction. The contractors acquired large amounts of wood to create the formwork, into which the temple's concrete slabs were to be poured. The wooden forms were constructed to uniform dimensions of 12 by 3.5 feet (3.7 m × 1.1 m), allowing them to be reused; each timber form was made of several 2-by-4 boards. Rectangular blocks of wood were used to cast the facade's 12-foot-tall (3.7 m) concrete columns, which had to be cast in multiple pieces because they were too large. The various pieces of each column were bound together using grout.

Wright contemplated embedding red granite or another material into the outer walls. Twenty samples of concrete, embedded with red granite or gravel, were presented to the board of trustees for review. Church officials decided not to use red granite due to the expense involved; instead, they agreed to apply an acidic solution to roughen the facade. The concrete walls were poured at a rate of no more than 18 inches (460 mm) every 24 hours. The walls were constructed one by one, and the wooden forms had to be disassembled and rebuilt after each wall was completed, which caused further delays. In addition, concrete could not be poured during the wintertime. Foster & Glidden Co. were hired in September 1906 to install the electrical, plumbing, and heating and ventilation systems. Although Mueller's contract mandated that the temple be completed by November 1906, the exterior was not nearly finished at that time. This prompted Edwin Ehrman, the building committee's leader, to complain to Mueller. Furthermore, Wright frequently modified the plans while construction was underway, then tried to force the trustees to pay for the increased costs, to which they refused. Mueller, who did not reject Wright's changes, lost money as a result and eventually went bankrupt.

==== Delays and completion ====
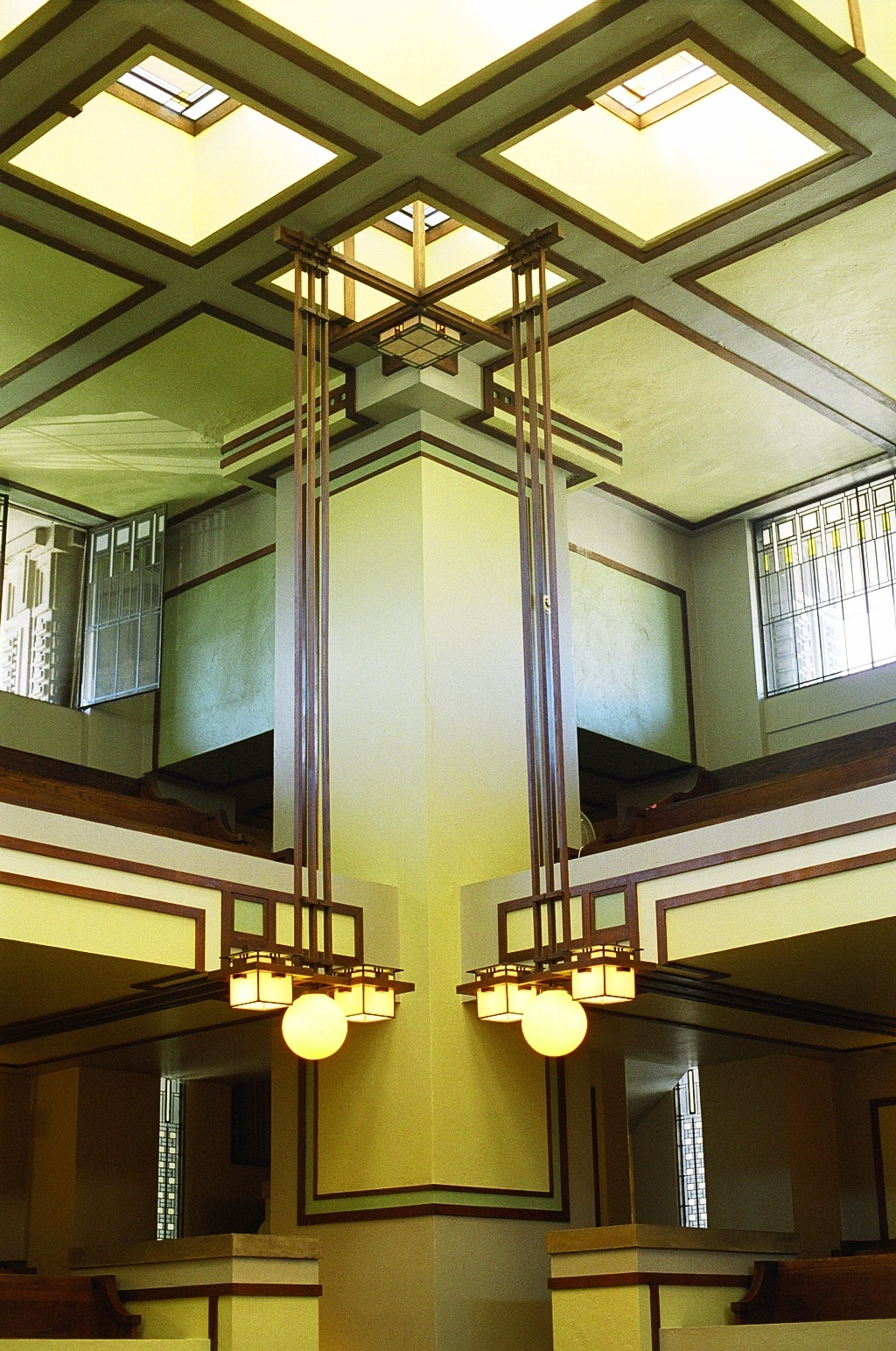
One of the piers in Unity Temple's auditorium

The heating system was installed in February 1907. Amid increasing expenses and decreasing revenue, the congregation's general fund had dwindled to $11.31 by March, (Note: Equivalent to $391 in 2025 (Note: 1634–1699: McCusker, J. J. (1997). How Much Is That in Real Money? A Historical Price Index for Use as a Deflator of Money Values in the Economy of the United States: Addenda et Corrigenda (PDF). American Antiquarian Society. 1700–1799: McCusker, J. J. (1992). How Much Is That in Real Money? A Historical Price Index for Use as a Deflator of Money Values in the Economy of the United States (PDF). American Antiquarian Society. 1800–present: Federal Reserve Bank of Minneapolis. "Consumer Price Index (estimate) 1800–".)) and many former members had departed. Oak Leaves wrote that "the finances were in good condition", despite a shortfall in the construction fund. By then, Wright wrote that Unity House would be finished in May and the auditorium in September. The eastern wall and parts of the auditorium's stair towers had been completed by May, but the roofs had not been constructed. Church officials had resorted to borrowing money, despite a concerted attempt to obtain donations and other fees from the congregation. Unity House began hosting services on September 15, 1907, and the church's Ladies Social Union purchased some furniture the same week. The auditorium's roof had been completed, but the terraces and entrance pavilion were still under construction, and landscaping work was still ongoing. Congregants had to enter Unity House through the back door.

Wright and the contractors continued to fine-tune the building's heating system, and the contractors submitted invoices for their work, which the congregation could not afford to pay. The project was paused in late 1907, and Ehrman requested that Wright provide a timetable for Unity Temple's completion, which the architect did in January 1908. That February, Wright invited artists and musicians to attend a "Symposium of Art" at Unity House. Wright wrote to the congregation the next month, requesting that Mueller be paid $11,000. (Note: Equivalent to $270,000 in 2024) Congregants pledged $5,771 for the building's completion at their annual meeting the same month, (Note: Equivalent to $142,000 in 2024) which allowed the trustees to finally reimburse Mueller. The plasterwork was completed in July 1908, after the board of trustees had threatened to fire Mueller over his failure to finish the plastering. The temple's mechanical contractor Foster & Glidden were completing the building's electrical systems by August, and the pews were under construction by that September. All of the art glass had also been installed by then.

The auditorium's opening, scheduled for October 11, 1908, was postponed due to delays in manufacturing the pews. The auditorium hosted its first service on October 25, 1908, though Wright did not attend. The building could not be formally dedicated because the organ had not been installed; church officials had received bids from a dozen organ manufacturers, many of whom were discouraged by Wright's abstruse drawings. The church did not hire a manufacturer until September 1908, when officials paid Coburn & Taylor $3,500 to install an organ in two months. (Note: Equivalent to $86,000 in 2024) The heating system was also ineffective, and the boiler burst shortly after the auditorium opened, forcing the congregation to vacate the auditorium until February 1909.

Construction issues notwithstanding, congregants quickly came to like the new temple. By 1909, the congregation's membership consisted of more than 140 families. During that year, church officials largely resolved their remaining disputes with contractors, and the decorations inside were finished. Johonnot resigned that June, expressing frustration that he had received little encouragement from the congregation during his tenure. Church members refused to accept his resignation, as he was still popular among members of the congregation. Johonnot ultimately agreed to remain Unity Church's pastor for one more year. The temple was officially dedicated on September 26, 1909, and the congregation published a brochure for the occasion. The temple had cost $60,344.55, and the congregation borrowed some $14,500 to pay for the cost overruns. (Note: The final cost is equivalent to $1,502,000 in 2024. The congregation borrowed the equivalent of $361,000.) Members pledged two-thirds, or nearly $32,200, of the remaining cost, (Note: Equivalent to $802,000 in 2024) though it took them several years to raise funds for construction.

== Temple usage ==
=== Early and mid-20th century ===
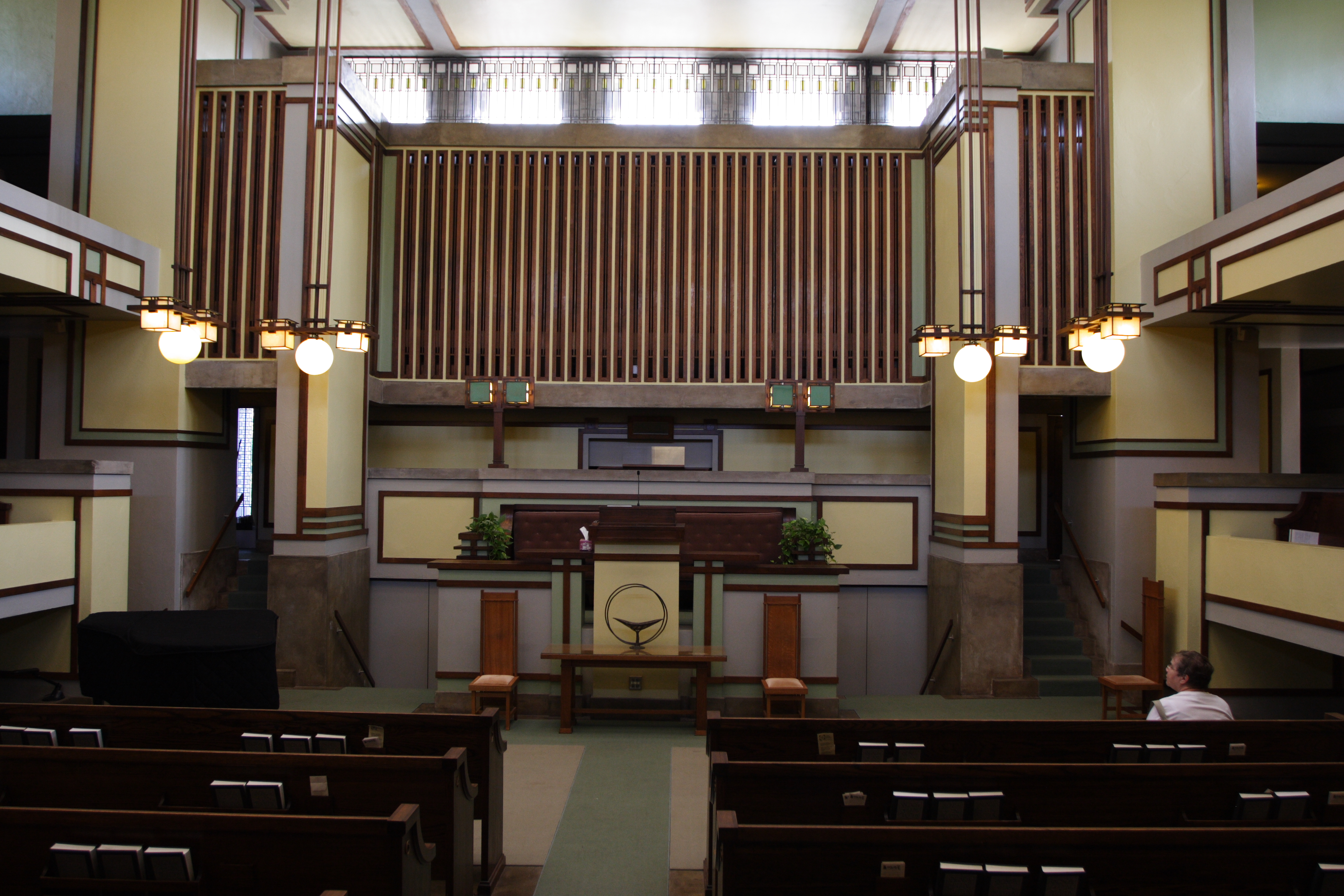
View of the auditorium's pulpit from the north

After Unity Temple opened, the building's architecture attracted visitors from across the U.S. Johonnot ultimately resigned at the end of June 1910. The next pastor, S. G. Dunham, served until early 1913. William J. Taylor became Unity Temple's pastor in November 1913 and began giving sermons there the next month. During Taylor's tenure, the congregation paid back its remaining debt of $6,000, (Note: Equivalent to $146,000 in 2024) and Gale donated a parsonage. Taylor resigned in 1919 to become the pastor of First Universalist Church in Wausau, Wisconsin, and he was succeeded by James W. Vallentyne. The congregation celebrated the 50th anniversary of its founding with a weeklong party in early 1921. Vallentyne resigned as Unity Church's pastor in 1924, though he remained in Oak Park for several months. D. T. Denman, who had served various congregations in Oak Park for two decades, merged the congregation of his Community Center with that of Unity Church in 1925, becoming the combined congregation's pastor.

Denman served until 1932 and was replaced that year with Frank D. Adams. In 1935, the congregation of the Church of the Redeemer in Chicago also merged with Unity Church's congregation. The congregation had 200 members by the mid-1940s, who met every Sunday from September to June; by then, the church was called the Unity Universalist Church. John Q. Parkhurst was elected as the church's pastor in early 1945, just after Adams resigned. The next year, Unity House was lent to a local youth club, and its interior was redecorated to resemble a ship's lounge; the club operated there for three months. At the time, the congregation's membership included many of Oak Park's longtime families, in addition to congregants from neighboring towns and villages. Forest Leaves reported that the building was depicted in a wide range of architectural publications and that it attracted visitors from around the world, though local residents largely ignored it.

Parkhurst left the congregation in 1952, and Robert M. Rice became the church's new minister. By then, the congregation had 325 members who met every Sunday except in August, and the church's youth fellowship met every other Sunday. The church was known simply as the Universalist Church by the late 1950s. The temple also hosted visiting architects, including Wright himself, as well as several groups of students each year. Rice left the building largely intact during his tenure, converting Unity House's two balconies to classrooms and adding a chapel for children. In addition, in 1959, workers filled in cracks and covered up exposed rods, and they applied a stucco-like paste to the exterior.

=== Late 20th century ===
==== 1960s ====
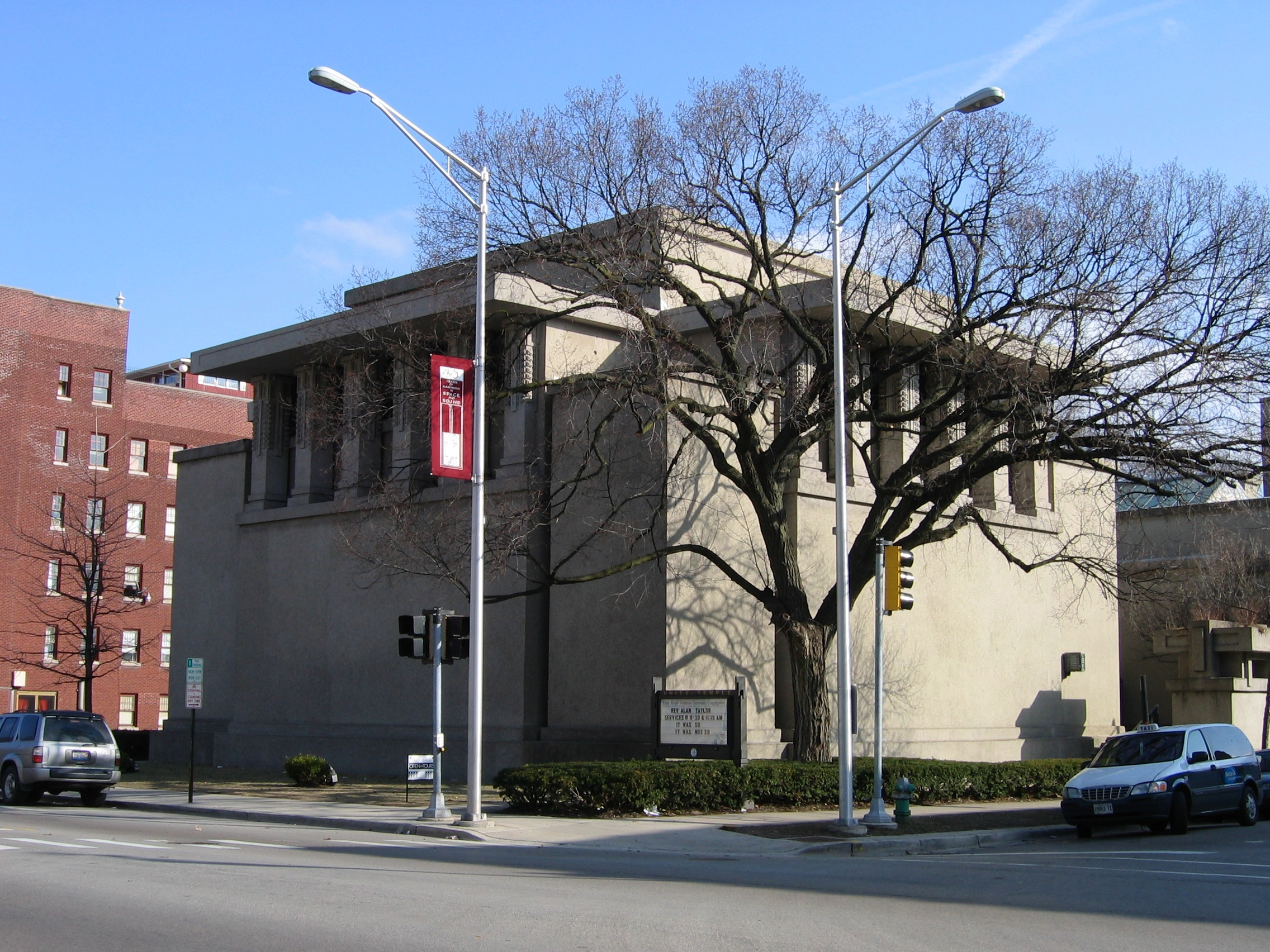
The temple as seen from Lake Street and Kenilworth Avenue

By the 1960s, the concrete had begun to spall and leak; the congregation ruled out the idea of using stucco to patch the facade, and there were discussions about potentially demolishing the temple. Instead, Wright's son-in-law William Wesley Peters, a principal in Taliesin Associated Architects, oversaw a restoration of the building, which was completed in 1961 for $22,000. (Note: Equivalent to $176,000 in 2024) Workers patched the cracks by sandblasting the concrete, placing a cement aggregate into the cracks, and applying another mixture to wear away the facade's topmost layer. A sealant was then applied onto the facade, and the building was repainted in its original color scheme. The temple was rededicated in 1962. By then, the congregation had a religious school and a youth club, in addition to its typical Sunday services. The building still attracted international visitors, while the congregation had become known as the Unitarian Universalist Church.

John Michiels renovated the temple's lower level in 1966 for $20,000, (Note: Equivalent to $137,000 in 2024) though these modifications did not follow Wright's original design. The work involved refurbishing a bathroom and three classrooms. Church officials formed a committee in 1967 to raise funds for a further renovation of Unity Temple. That May, the congregation decided to open the temple for public tours five days a week to raise money for the renovations. It cost $1,000 to launch the tour program, (Note: Equivalent to $7,158 in 2024) which did not make a net profit until its second year. The skylights were subsequently replaced in 1968; since the tours had not raised sufficient funds, the women's auxiliary at Unity Temple helped fund part of the project. The next year, the Edgar J. Kaufmann Foundation pledged $75,000 in matching funds toward the temple's renovation (Note: Equivalent to $537,000 in 2024) after Edgar Kaufmann Jr., a former Wright acolyte, heard about the initiative. Bill Fyfe and Michiels jointly designed a restoration plan. According to Michiels, the wiring, doors, stairs, windows, and sidewalks needed repairs the most urgently.

==== 1970s ====
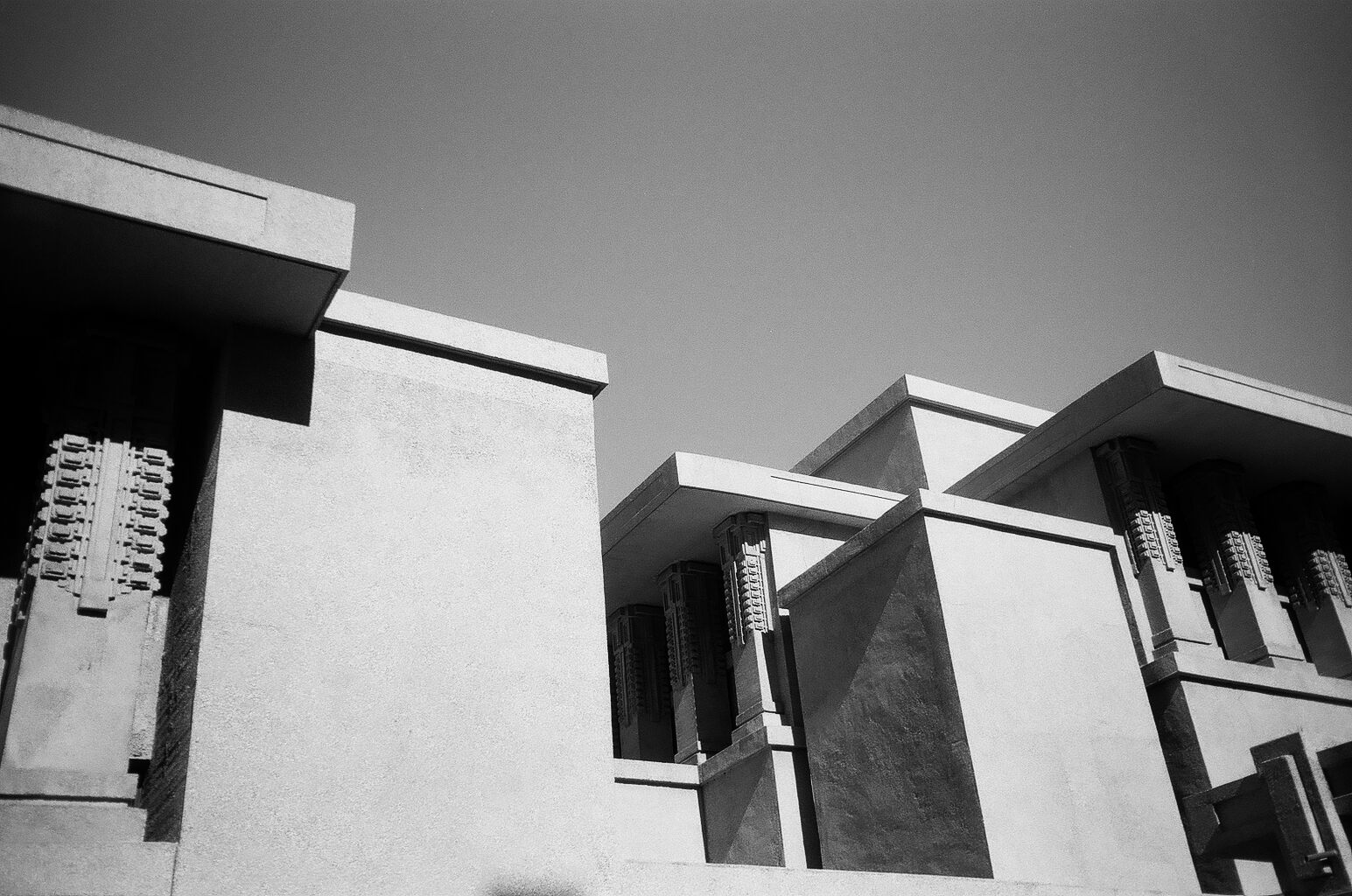
Detail of the Kenilworth Avenue facade

By 1970, the church had raised $25,000 from tours, subscriptions, and donations. (Note: Equivalent to $155,000 in 2024) The restoration also received funds from the congregation itself, the National Park Service, four anonymous donors, and Alden B. Dow, in addition to tour revenue and insurance payments. After Rice retired in 1970, he was replaced by Gerald Krick the following March. In addition, a committee was formed to oversee the restoration, which was prioritized after a fire had damaged Unity House in January 1971. A local firm, Sturr-Young Associates, was hired to repaint the auditorium in its original colors, restore the skylights, and redecorate the interior, while Frank's son Lloyd Wright was retained as a consultant. The congregation was unable to raise the funds for the temple's upkeep by itself. As such, congregants directed the board of trustees to establish a foundation to oversee the temple's restoration in December 1972. The Unity Temple Restoration Corporation was formed the next year as a secular entity, separate from the congregation. The restoration group raised $500 per month from small donors and tour revenue, (Note: Equivalent to $4,145 in 2025) and it received additional funding from large donors, the federal and local governments, and the congregation.

A restoration of the facade commenced in 1973 and ultimately cost $200,000. (Note: Equivalent to $1,075,000 in 2024) Workers removed the cladding that had been added in the 1960s, and they sprayed shotcrete, a type of concrete, onto the facade. The interior was also repainted and partially rewired. That year, the Kaufmann Foundation increased their grant to $250,000, (Note: Equivalent to $1,344,000 in 2024) at which point the church had raised $230,000. (Note: Equivalent to $1,237,000 in 2024) The temple could also receive federal restoration funds because it was on the National Register of Historic Places, so the Illinois Department of Conservation requested $114,850 for interior restoration in late 1973. (Note: Equivalent to $617,000 in 2024) The temple began hosting concerts later that year, and it launched a concert series that helped raise money for the renovation. To raise further money, the church sponsored field trips to Taliesin, Wright's studio in Wisconsin. By 1975, church officials had spent more than $250,000 over the preceding eight years, but the project needed at least another $250,000. (Note: Both figures are equivalent to $1,128,000 in 2024) In addition, the Restoration Foundation had gone into debt.

The Restoration Foundation had nearly matched the Kaufmann grant by 1976, and it wanted to create a $500,000 financial endowment for Unity Temple's continued upkeep. The Kaufmann Foundation offered a grant to establish the restoration fund in April 1978, provided that the Restoration Foundation raised $50,000 in eight weeks. The next year, the Kaufmann Foundation offered another $50,000 matching grant. (Note: Both matching grants are equivalent to $941,000 in 2024) Work on the foyer's renovation began in May 1979 and was nearly completed by the end of the year. The foyer was restored to its original appearance, and later modifications, such as ceiling tiles and shelves, were removed. The Restoration Foundation also planned to repair the leaky roof, a project that ultimately cost $85,000. (Note: Equivalent to $295,000 in 2024) A company from Washington, D.C., was hired to determine the original paint colors.

==== 1980s and 1990s ====
Seen at dusk

Charles Scot Giles became Unity Temple's pastor in 1981 following a year-long search. The next year, the Restoration Foundation established a subcommittee to organize events at the temple. By then, the temple received 10,000 to 15,000 annual visitors, and the Restoration Foundation was planning to spend $500,000 on the interior. (Note: Equivalent to $2,139,000 in 2024) The auditorium was subsequently repainted gray, green-gray, yellow, and ivory, and magnesite carpets were added. This work was completed in 1984, coinciding with the 75th anniversary of the temple's dedication. The temple received a $20,000 matching grant from Domino's cofounder Thomas Monaghan in 1987, (Note: Equivalent to $47,000 in 2024) which was to be used to restore the temple's skylights. By then, the predicted cost of the renovation had increased to $750,000. (Note: Equivalent to $1,771,000 in 2024) In addition, the Landmarks Preservation Council of Illinois and the congregation signed an agreement to preserve the temple in January 1988. The council received a preservation easement that limited changes to the temple. The auditorium's skylights were repaired that year, and a firm from Wisconsin restored the panels and replaced 40% of the glass.

Despite large donations from Kaufmann, Domino's, and Steelcase, officials at the Restoration Foundation reported decreasing revenue in the 1980s. Foundation officials commissioned a report in 1989, which found that the roof was in very poor condition; foundation officials estimated that the roof would cost $280,000 to repair. (Note: Equivalent to $615,000 in 2024) Though the foundation wanted to dismantle part of the roof for inspection, congregation members disputed the report's findings and considered severing their relationship with the foundation. Ultimately, the congregation decided to continue working with the foundation, and it ordered additional inspections of the roof. During the 1990s, the temple continued to host tours for a fee, along with services every Sunday. Shirley Ann Ranck was named as Unity Temple's interim minister in 1991, becoming the first woman to lead the congregation in a century. F. Jay Deacon became the permanent minister of the congregation in 1993, and the clerestory windows were repaired that year.

The congregation merged with the Beacon Unitarian Church in 1994, becoming the Unity Temple Unitarian Universalist Congregation. That year, the Restoration Foundation established a volunteer program to raise further money; it sought to raise $600,000 over seven years. (Note: Equivalent to $1,125,000 in 2024) The temple started hosting avant-garde music concerts in 1996 to raise more money. The Oak Park village government allocated $32,500 in 1999 for a study of the temple's exterior. (Note: Equivalent to $57,000 in 2024) By then, $1.5 million had been spent on restoration. Simultaneously, the Restoration Foundation was raising $1.5 million in advance of the temple's centennial. (Note: Both amounts are equivalent to $2,648,000 in 2024) Unlike other state governments, Illinois did not provide historic-preservation loans at the time, although it subsequently began distributing such loans. State representative Angelo Saviano negotiated to secure state funding for Unity Temple after seeing the poor condition of the exterior.

=== 21st century ===
==== 2000s ====
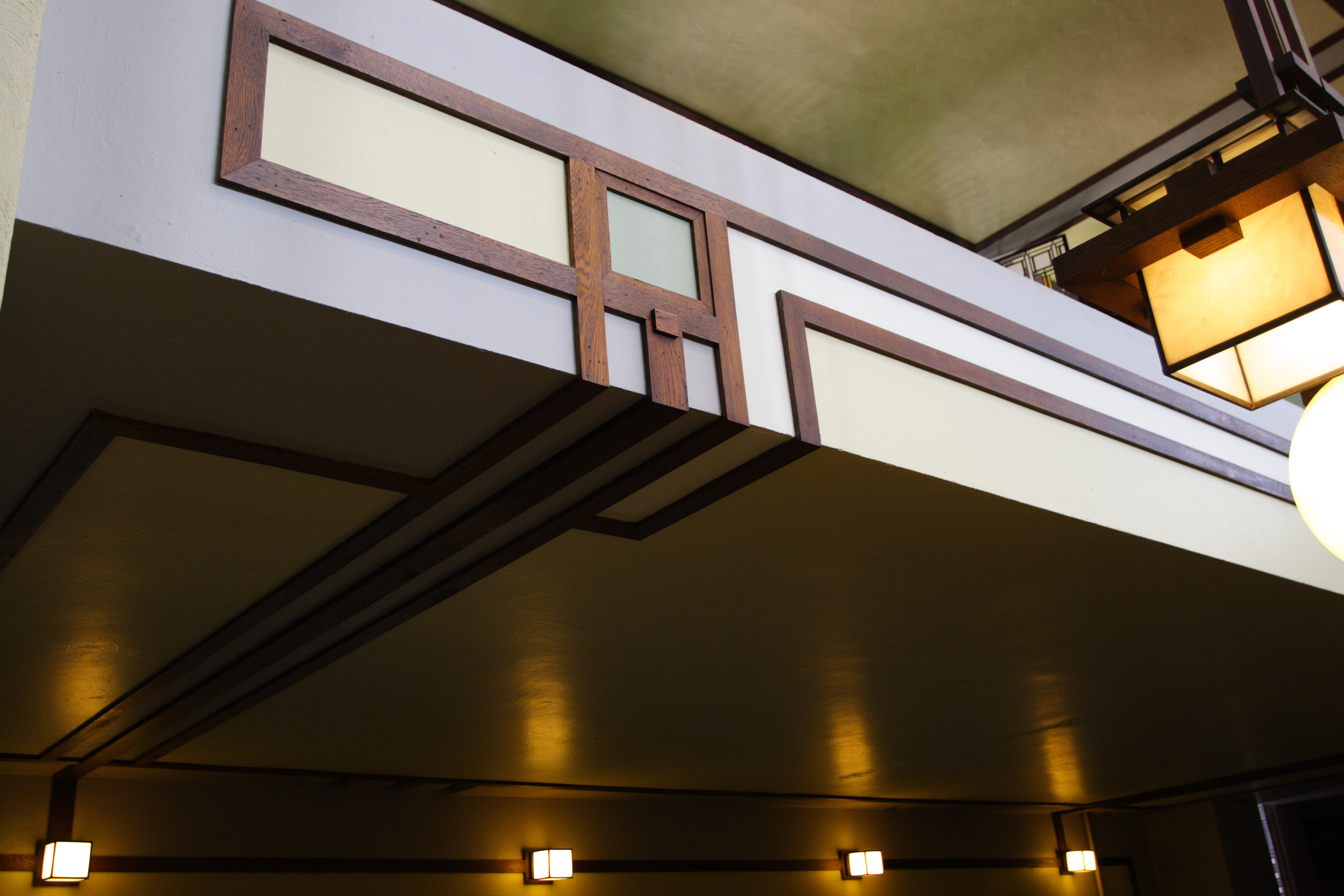
Detail of the balcony railing in the auditorium

Unity Temple still had serious mechanical and structural issues in the 21st century. The building had no air-conditioning system, leading to significant temperature fluctuations; the temperature sometimes reached 125 °F (52 °C) during the summer. The temple's roof sagged significantly, while the interiors were damaged by carbon-dioxide buildups and humidity. The art glass, which had cracked due to repeated freezing and thawing over the years, needed to be repaired. The concrete facade had become cracked and spalled, and condensation had built up within the walls, causing it to rain inside. There were also leaks from the drains inside the building. Workers began removing concrete samples from the facade in January 2000 in preparation for a wider-ranging renovation. After the Landmarks Preservation Council of Illinois labeled the building among Illinois's most endangered structures that March, the state government gave Unity Temple $1 million for restoration.

By late 2000, workers were about to restore the concrete. This work was part of a larger, three-phase project which would cost up to $5 million. Holes were cut into the facade, and the underlying rebar was replaced. Fern C. Stanley was appointed as interim pastor in August 2002. After her death in May 2003, Alan Taylor became Unity Temple's pastor the same year. At that point, there were 359 congregants, though Taylor helped double the congregation's size during his 18-year tenure. The Landmarks Preservation Council provided $100,000 for a geothermal heating upgrade in 2004, which was part of the first phase of a $12–15 million renovation. The Restoration Foundation planned to patch the concrete and add a heating, ventilation, and air conditioning system. The third and final phase would entail restoration of the interior. Gunny Harboe, a restoration architect based in nearby Chicago, was hired to design a restoration of the temple. A test well for the heating system was installed in late 2005. The congregation continued to host tours, and it sold off furniture and furnishings to raise money.

By the mid-2000s, the temple attracted 25–30 thousand annual visitors, many of them from outside the U.S. Because parts of the temple were still being used as offices and classrooms, they could not be renovated until the congregation obtained additional space. Part of the ceiling collapsed around 2008; the water damage was attributed to the lack of expansion joints and a flat roof. A huge piece of the left wall had cracked open, and there were cracks in the facade and leaks throughout the building. Unity Temple received a $200,000 matching funds grant in December 2008 through the Save America's Treasures program, contingent on the congregation raising an equivalent amount for the temple's restoration. The next year, the National Trust for Historic Preservation added Unity Temple to its America's Most Endangered Places list, and the temple received more than $82,000 for visitor services such as tours and brochures. By then, the renovation was scheduled to cost $20–25 million, and the Restoration Foundation hoped to raise more money for restoration if the building were designated as a World Heritage Site.

==== 2010s to present ====
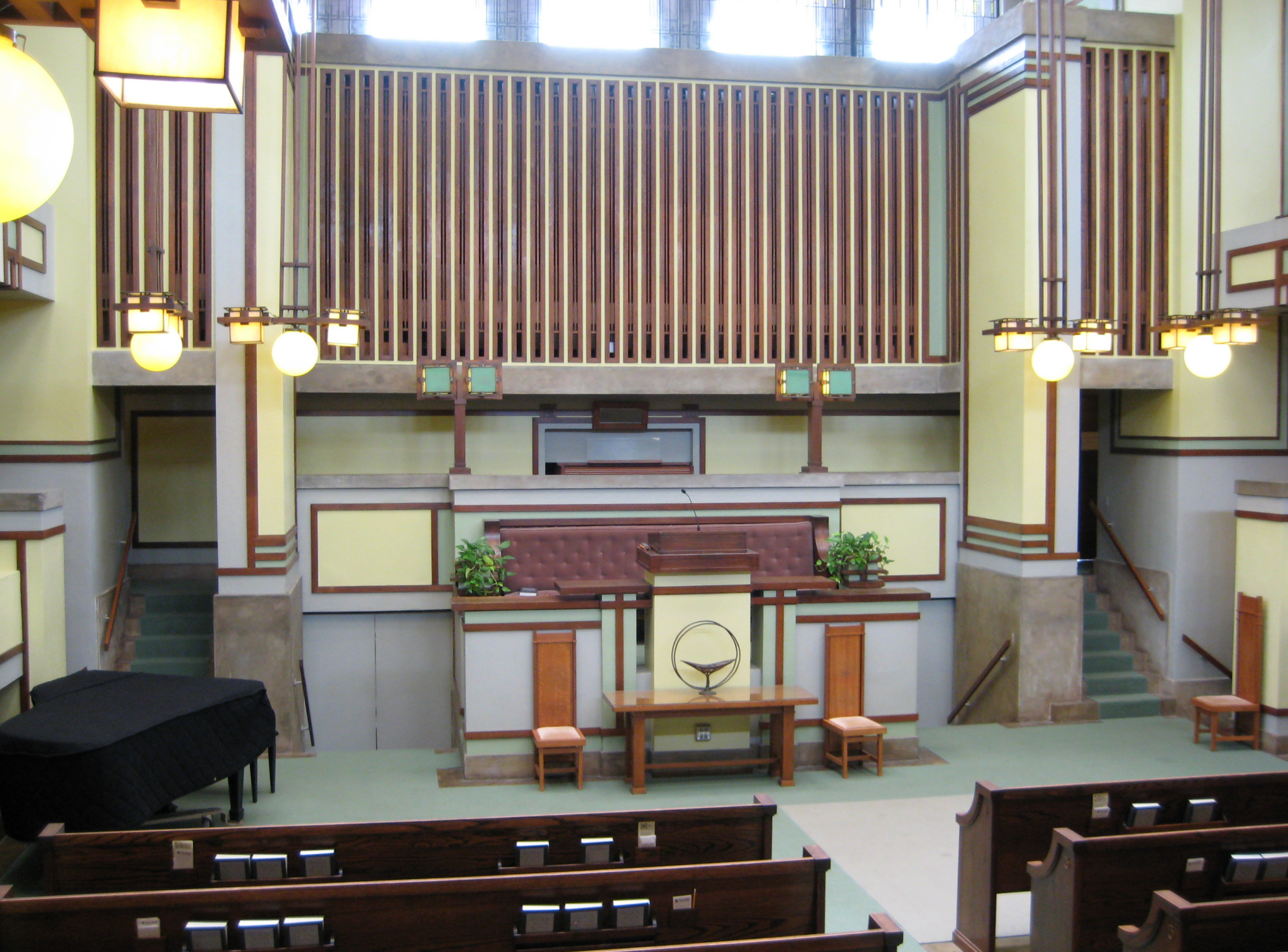
Interior of the auditorium, facing the pulpit

Most of the letters from the sign above Unity Temple's main entrance were stolen in 2010, shortly after the roof was replaced for $500,000. After the congregation raised $3,000 to replace the letters, a local preservation firm installed a new sign above the entrance. The Alphawood Foundation pledged $10 million toward the temple's restoration in 2013. The congregation also considered transferring ownership of the temple to Alphawood so that organization could help maintain the building. By early 2015, the Restoration Foundation had about $11.5 million or $12.5 million on hand. Restorers drew up detailed plans to repaint the building, restore the original architectural features, and repair mechanical systems; the plans needed approval from three agencies before renovations could start.

A full restoration began in 2015, at which point the project was to cost $23 million or $25 million. The congregation relocated that June; services were hosted in the nearby United Lutheran Church, while church officials also used an administrative office on South Boulevard and another office nearby. The first phase of the project involved replacing the skylights, roof, and shotcrete facade. A second phase included the geothermal and HVAC system, new art glass, and new light fixtures. The windows were restored in California, and new electric wiring, glass, and wood finishes were added. The project was supposed to be completed in late 2016 but was postponed by several months because of restorers' focus on architectural details. The congregation bought the nearby Oak Park Billiards building on South Boulevard in 2016, which was also renovated.

Following a preview event in May 2017 to mark the renovation's completion, the temple formally reopened on June 17, 2017, and tours resumed that July. About half of the construction cost had been raised at the time. After a developer proposed a 28-story tower nearby in 2018, the church's board of trustees expressed concerns that the tower would cast shadows on the temple; the tower was eventually canceled. Alan Taylor resigned as Unity Temple's senior minister in 2021. Roger Bertschausen became the senior minister in 2023, and the Unity Temple Restoration Foundation was dissolved that year.

== Building ==
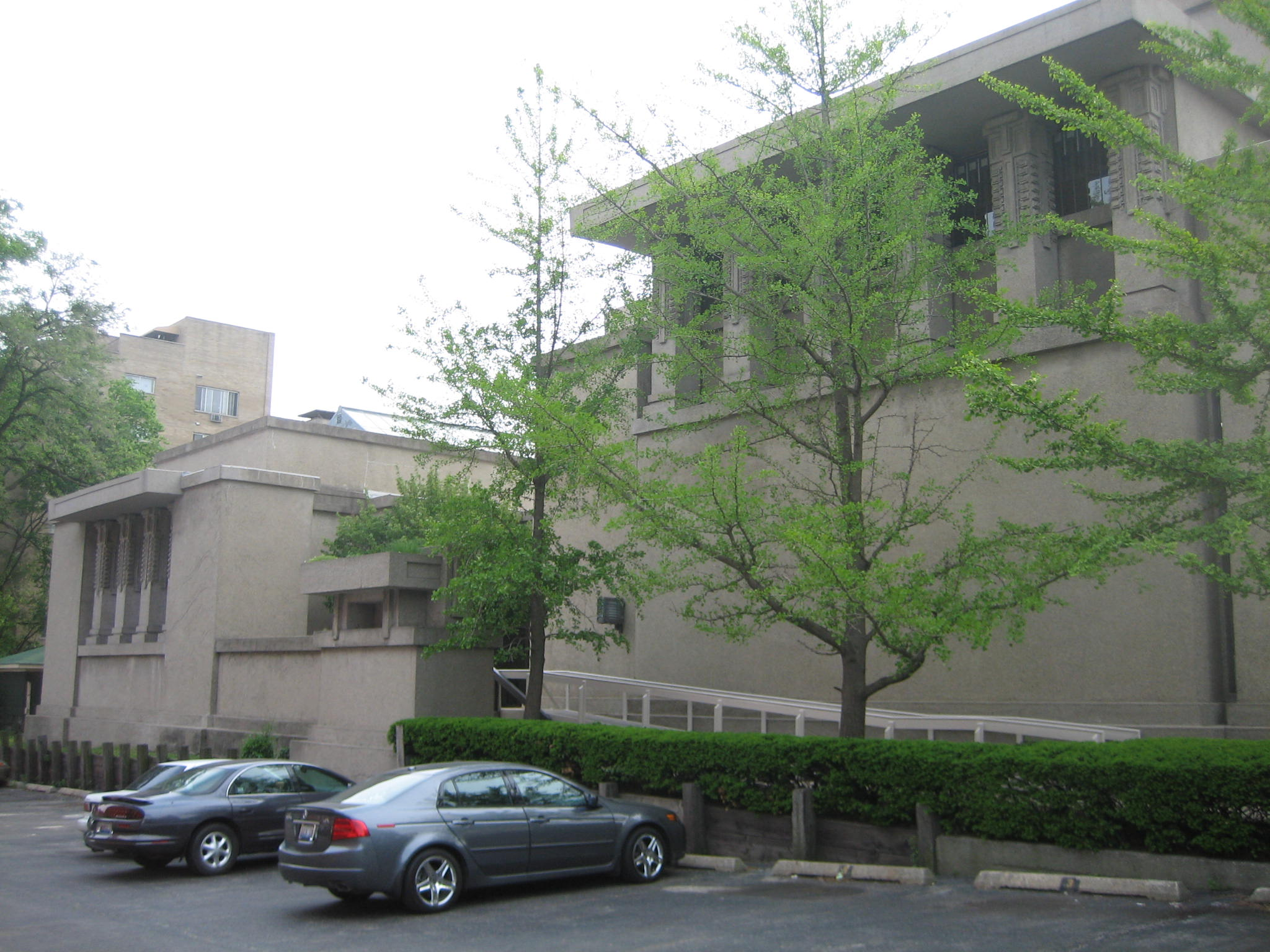
The temple as seen from a parking lot to the east

Unity Temple is located at 875 Lake Street in Oak Park, Illinois, United States. Designed by Frank Lloyd Wright in the Prairie style, the structure is T-shaped in plan, measuring 142 feet (43 m) or 144 feet (44 m) long from north to south. On the same city block to the east is Scoville Square. The Calvary Memorial Church is nearby to the west, across Kenilworth Avenue, while the Oak Park Public Library and Scoville Park are directly to the north, across Lake Street. In addition, the Oak Park station of the Chicago "L"'s Green Line is two blocks to the southeast.

Unity Temple is one of 24 or 25 buildings that Wright designed in Oak Park, as well as Wright's only significant remaining Prairie-style structure that was designed as a public building. Wright used abstract motifs instead of overtly religious imagery, and he described the building as a "temple" because its simple motifs resembled those of old temples. Unity Temple is arranged around a grid of cubic "units" measuring 6 5/6 feet (2.1 m) on each side. The building is made of four types of concrete, which were poured in place and used because of the material's low cost. Concrete and crushed limestone are used in the 3-foot-thick (0.91 m) foundation walls at the perimeter of the building, as well as underneath the columns. Interior and exterior walls are made of a concrete-and-gravel aggregate with embedded steel rods. The Temple Art Glass Company manufactured Unity Temple's multicolored art glass panes, which are bound together by strips of zinc.

Several elements of the design are shared with the now-demolished Larkin Building, which was completed shortly before Unity Temple was. For example, both structures included two rectangular spaces linked by an entrance pavilion, a layout also used in Wright's Oak Park studio. The Larkin Building and Unity Temple were both centered on a large communal room; in both structures, visitors had to make several turns to access the room, and there were balconies around the space itself. Other decorative elements, such as contrasting vertical and horizontal lines, were also visible in both structures. However, the two buildings also differed in key respects, such as their functions and shapes. Unity Temple also bears similarities to the Prairie style houses that Wright designed in Chicagoland; for instance, both Unity Temple and Wright's Prairie-style houses have windows with geometric patterns.

=== Exterior ===
The temple is composed of two main structures—the auditorium to the north and Unity House to the south—connected by a low, central entrance hall. The arrangement allowed religious and secular activities to be kept separate. The exterior of the auditorium section is a square measuring 64 feet (20 m) across and 47 feet (14 m) high, while Unity House measures about 90 by 50 feet (27 by 15 m) across. (Note: Oak Leaves April 27, 1907, p. 102, cites a significantly different dimension of 90 by 40 feet (27 by 12 m) for Unity House.) The two-story entrance building measures 30 by 24 feet (9.1 by 7.3 m) across. The facade is recessed 3 feet (0.91 m) from the southern edge of the site, 18 feet (5.5 m) from the western and eastern edges, and 23 feet (7.0 m) from the northern edge.

==== Facade ====
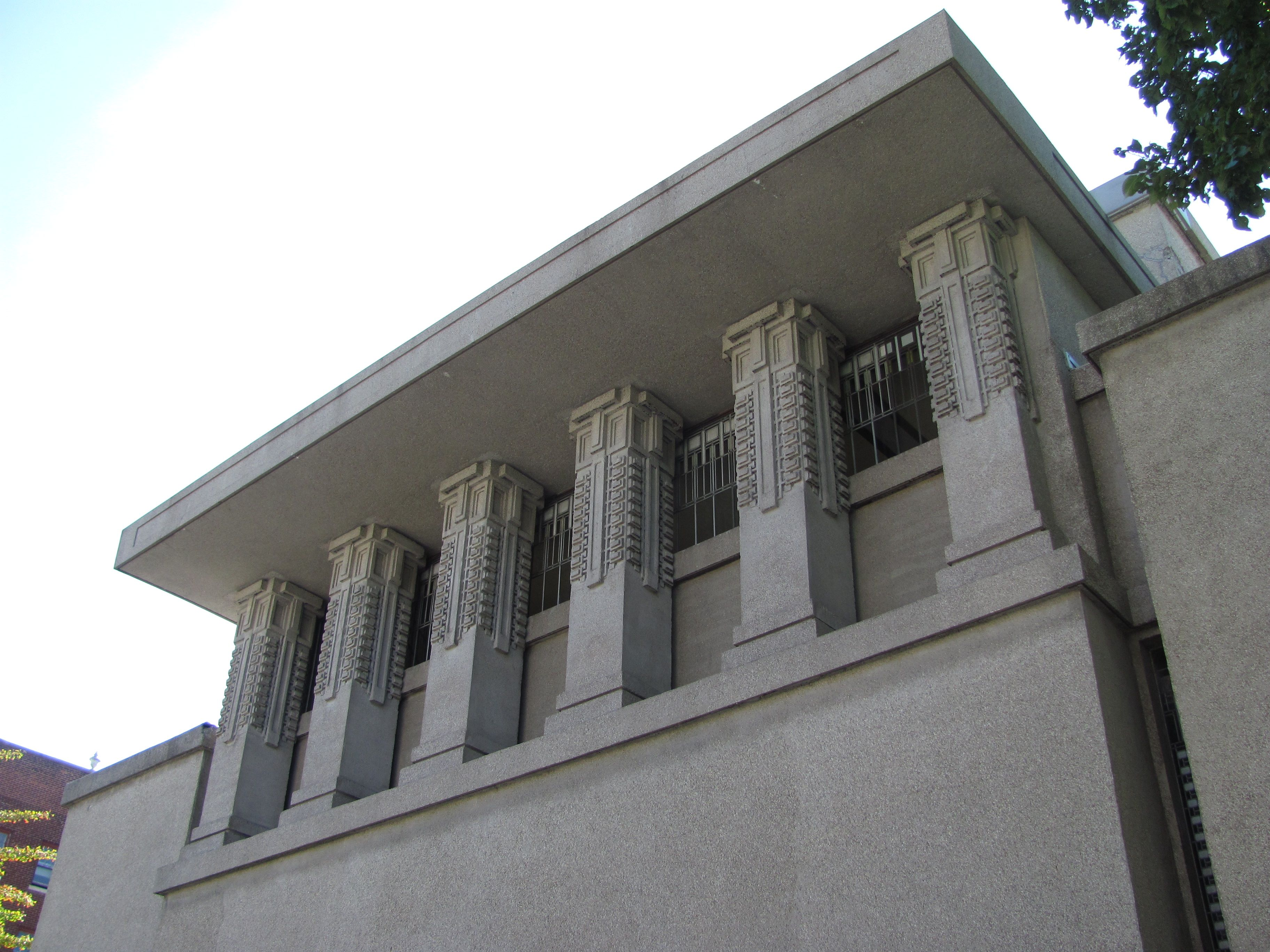
Clerestory windows at the top of the facade

The facade uses Portland cement. To give the facade some texture, the top layer of cement was washed away, exposing bits of gravel underneath. The wooden formwork created markings, which remained in place after the concrete had been poured. Joseph Siry described Unity Temple's exterior as a predecessor to the béton brut ("raw concrete") facades that became popular in the 1960s. There are stair towers at each corner of the auditorium building, which measure 24.5 feet (7.5 m) high and 11 2/3 by 11 2/3 feet (3.6 by 3.6 m) across. On each elevation of the facade, narrow slit windows separate the central portions of the facade from the staircase towers.

The base of the facade, directly above the foundation walls, is thicker than the rest of the facade and is decorated with square and rectangular moldings. Above the base, the facade takes two small steps inward. On each elevation of the facade, the central portions ascend without interruption to a protruding window sill, situated 22 feet (6.7 m) above ground. There is no entrance on Lake Street; instead, there is a low wall on Kenilworth Avenue, behind which a set of stairs ascends to the entrance pavilion. The words "For the worship of God / and the service of man" are inscribed in bronze letters above the entrance pavilion's doors. There are Japanese-inspired square lanterns on the exterior, next to the entrance. Next to the Kenilworth Avenue facade, there is a pier with colonnades and rectangular flower boxes.

The centers of all four elevations of the auditorium are decorated with clerestory windows, which are recessed and measure 38 by 63 inches (970 by 1,600 mm) across. The clerestory windows have geometric patterns and are largely made of plain glass, except for white and green panes at the tops of the windows. Each set of clerestory windows is flanked by six exterior columns. Additionally, Unity House has four columns on two of its elevations. All of the columns were designed by Richard Bock and measure 12 feet (3.7 m) tall. The columns are spaced 7 feet (2.1 m) apart, aligning with the interior grid. The tops of the columns are decorated with hollyhock motifs. The lowest 7 feet of each column is unornamented and was cast in one piece, while the ornate 5-foot-tall (1.5 m) upper sections were cast in four pieces. The bases of the columns are stepped inward, while the capitals are stepped outward, supporting the cantilevered roofs above. The juxtaposition of the columns, and the roofs above them, may have been an allusion to older classical-style and religious buildings with pillars. The facade is topped by square and rectangular copings. In the 2010s, lighting was installed on the ground outside the building.

==== Roofs ====
Unlike contemporary churches, Unity Temple was designed without a spire, nor did it include typical church features such as a tower or an arched roof. At the time of construction, church spires were increasingly outdated and were vulnerable to lightning strikes. The temple is instead topped by 14, 16, or 17 flat roofs. These are made of cinder concrete, topped with lightweight cinder-concrete tiles. Each roof is composed of slabs measuring 40 2/3 feet (12.4 m) wide. The auditorium roof's eaves extend 5 feet (1.5 m) outward from the facade's columns, overhanging the adjacent lawns and paths. The writer Neil Levine wrote that the cantilevered roofs created the impression that the interiors were being directed outward. The edges of each roof are twice as thick as the rest of the roof, creating a low parapet wall, while the eaves contrast with the facade's thick base.

=== Interior ===
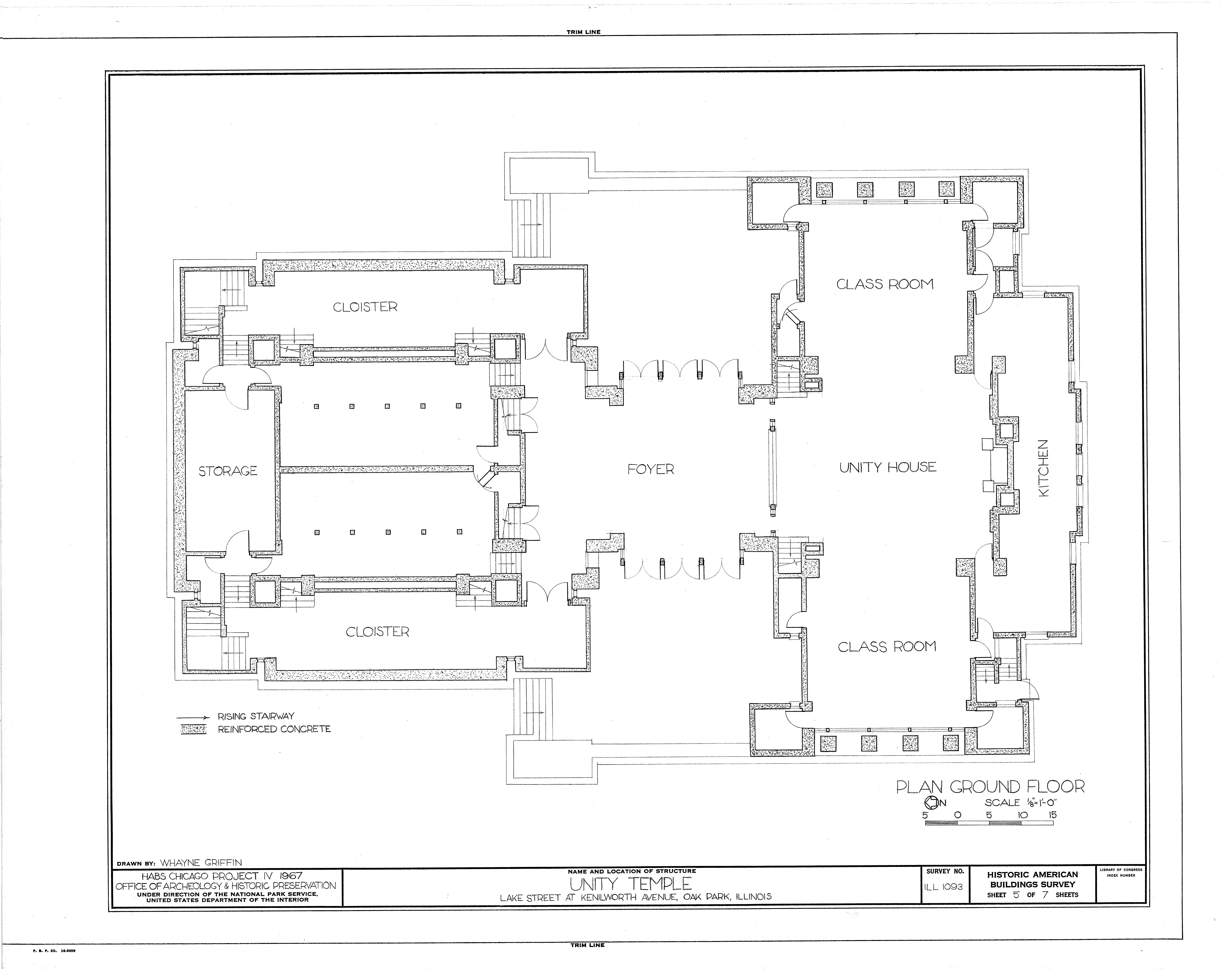
Ground floor plan, showing the foyer and Unity House's lower level

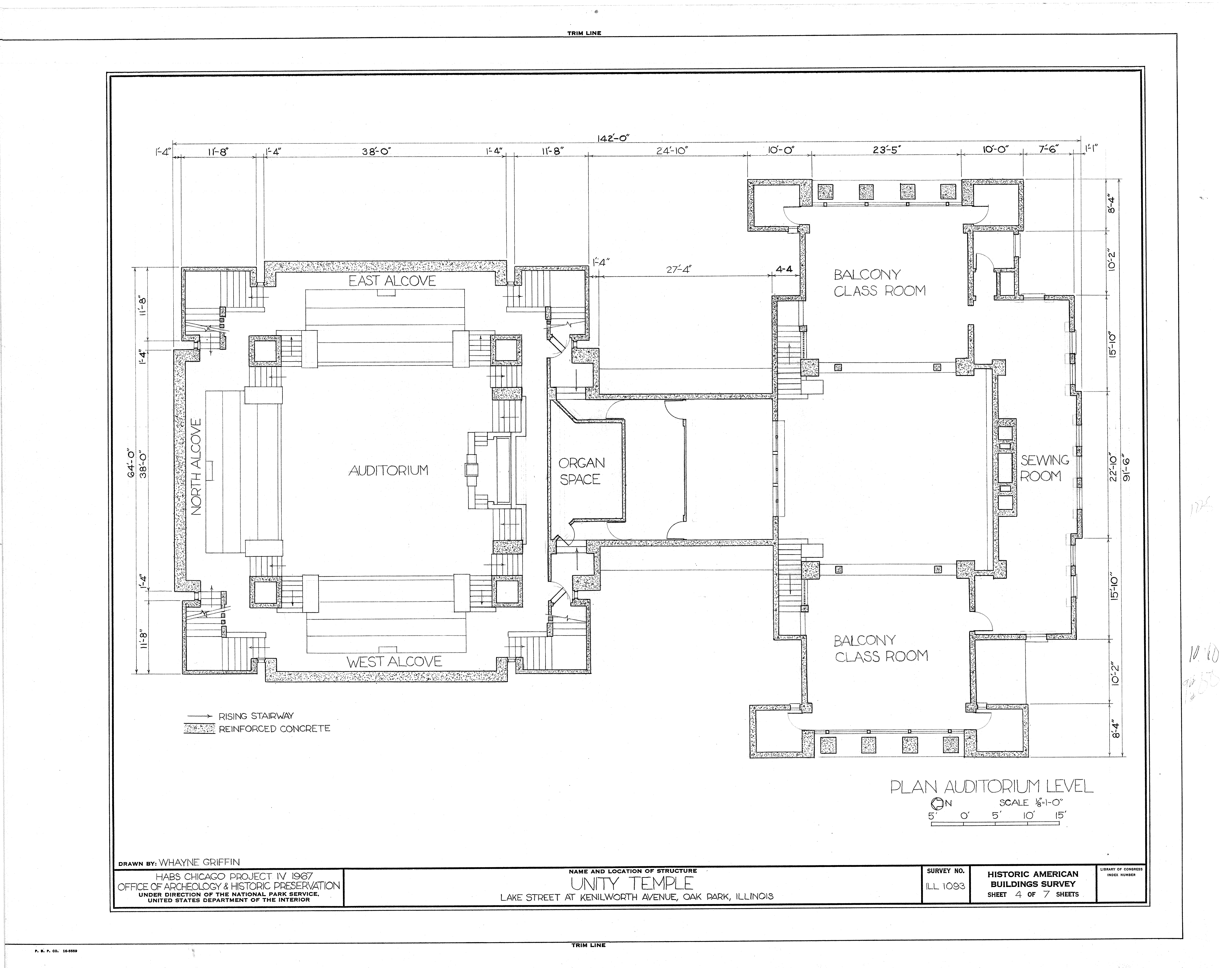
Auditorium-level floor plan, showing the auditorium's lower seating level and Unity House's upper level

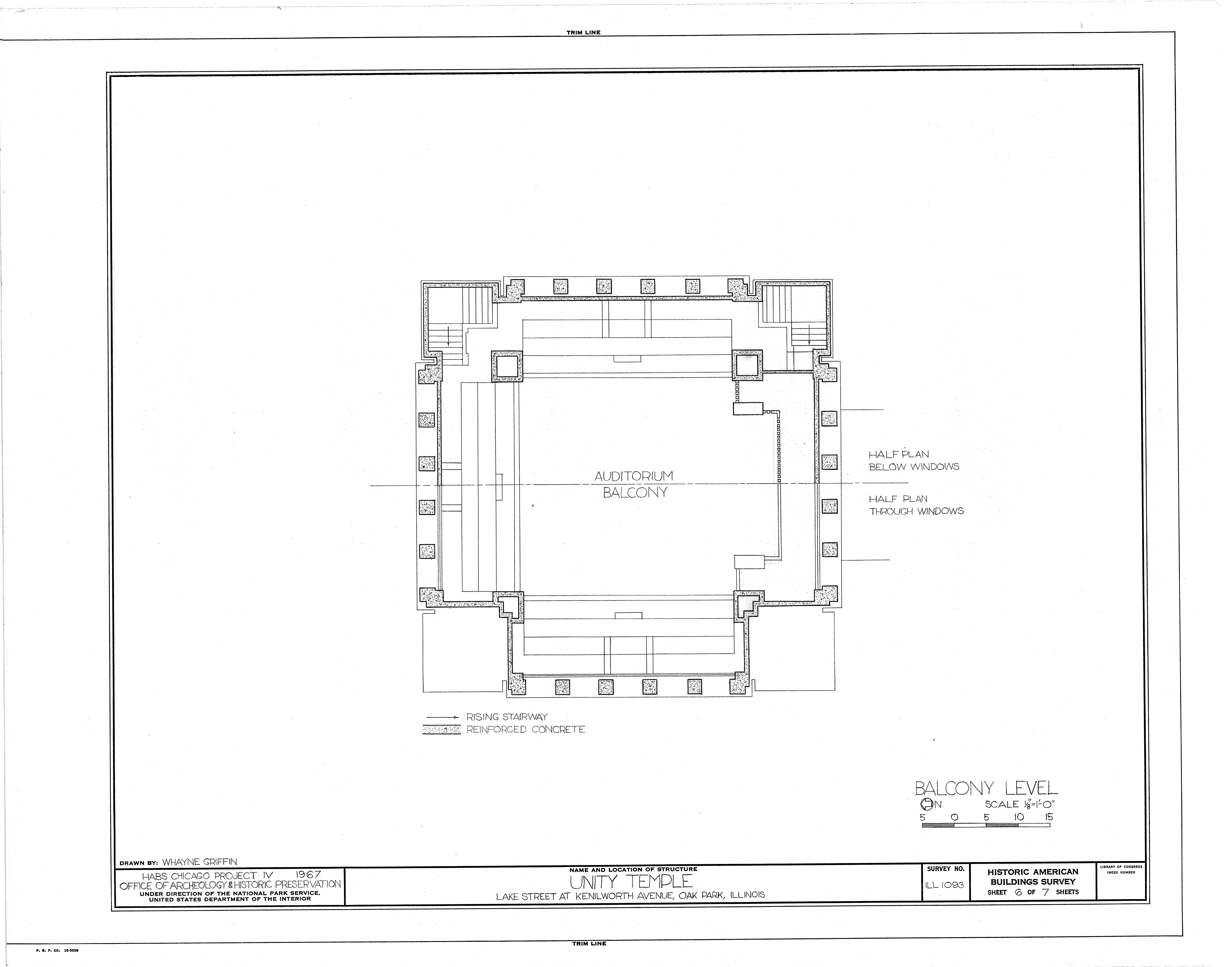
Balcony-level floor plan

Wright described Unity Temple's interior as reflecting "the reality of the building—the space in which we live and not the walls and the roof". The foundations and columns are made of conventional concrete; the floor slabs are made of cinder concrete, in which coal cinders are embedded into the cement. The superstructure also uses steel beams, which are entirely covered with concrete. The interior was more colorful than the gray exterior, in part because of the windows. The walls are made of plaster, which is covered with an aggregate of sand, cement, and putty; a sealant was added to this aggregate, and the sealant was painted. The interiors are also decorated with wooden boards, which not only articulate (or stylize) the interiors, but also conceal electrical wires. Joseph Siry described the decorations as "a poetic invention that sprang from Wright's own imagination", while Neil Levine wrote that the decorations highlighted "space and depth, rather than mass and volume". Wright also included high ceilings "for the contemplation for the soul", as Oak Leaves described it.

==== Entrance pavilion ====
An entrance pavilion, measuring 24 by 32 feet (7.3 by 9.8 m) across, connects the auditorium and Unity House. On the first floor, there is a foyer with a low ceiling, an example of the compression-and-release principle that Wright espoused. The foyer measures about 27 feet (8.2 m) wide and adjoins a cloak room and a bathroom. To the north, visitors make two 90-degree turns before reaching the auditorium's perimeter, as Wright wanted visitors to go on a "path of discovery" to reach the auditorium. The north wall of the foyer is decorated with wooden slats and was initially designed as a hidden exit from the auditorium, without any doorknobs or visible hinges.

The foyer's west and east walls each contain a bank of six doors measuring 20 feet (6.1 m) wide, with art-glass panes; the west doors form the main entrance. The south wall has a glass partition, behind which Unity House's fireplace can be seen. A pastor's study is located within the second floor of the pavilion and is directly connected to both the auditorium and Unity House.

==== Auditorium ====
===== Layout =====
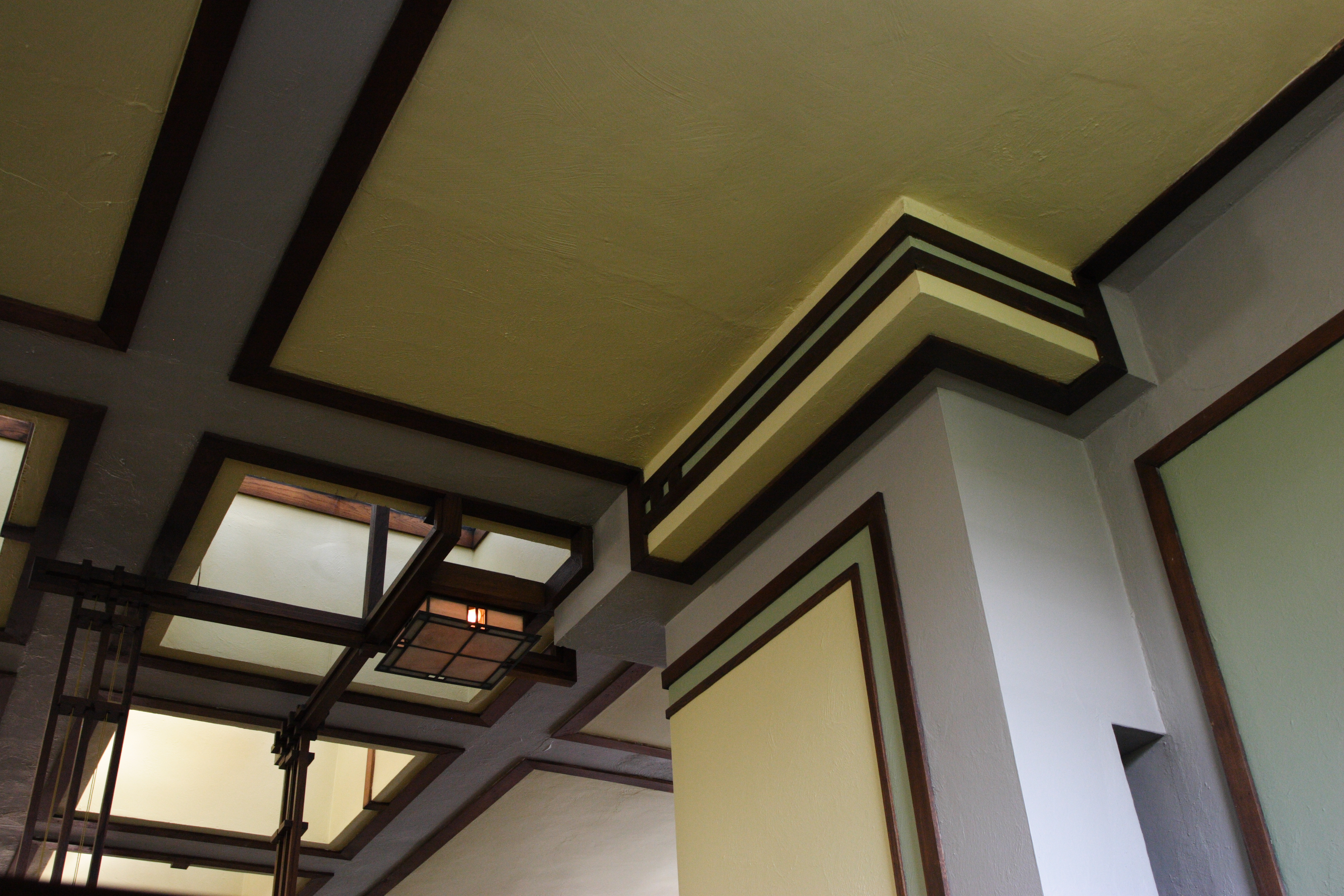
Detail of one of the piers, with wooden strips that meet at right angles

Wright wrote that he had "let the room inside be the architecture outside" by designing the rest of the temple around the auditorium. The auditorium at the north end of the temple has either 380 or 400 seats. It is shaped like a Greek cross, with a freestanding pier at each corner. This contrasted with other churches in Oak Park, which had naves that were significantly longer than their width. Wright wanted congregants to circulate around the auditorium's perimeter, rather than entering it from a central aisle, and he wanted the piers to draw visitors' attention inward. The piers are connected by "cloisters", hallways 4 feet (1.2 m) beneath the auditorium's main floor. According to Wright, this preserved the auditorium's "quiet and dignity" by allowing people to circulate around the room unnoticed. The bases of the piers contain small anterooms, and staircases ascend to the main floor and balcony level. The piers also include pipes and ducts for heating and ventilation. The piers are decorated with wooden strips that meet at right angles.

At the center of the cross is a square measuring 33 feet (10 m) on each side, with a pulpit at the center. The pulpit is arranged so it is no farther than 45 feet (14 m) or 75 feet (23 m) from any seat. In front of the pulpit is a railing with wooden boards across its surface and a wooden coping at its top. The center of the railing, in front of the pulpit's lectern, is slightly raised. There is a bench behind the railing, as well as lamps to either side. The southern wall contains a choir loft directly above the auditorium's entrance, which extends to the balcony level. The choir screen consists of a series of vertical slits and interlocking geometric planes. The screen protrudes from the south wall, providing space for the organ pipes behind it. There is a door to the pastor's study behind the choir screen.

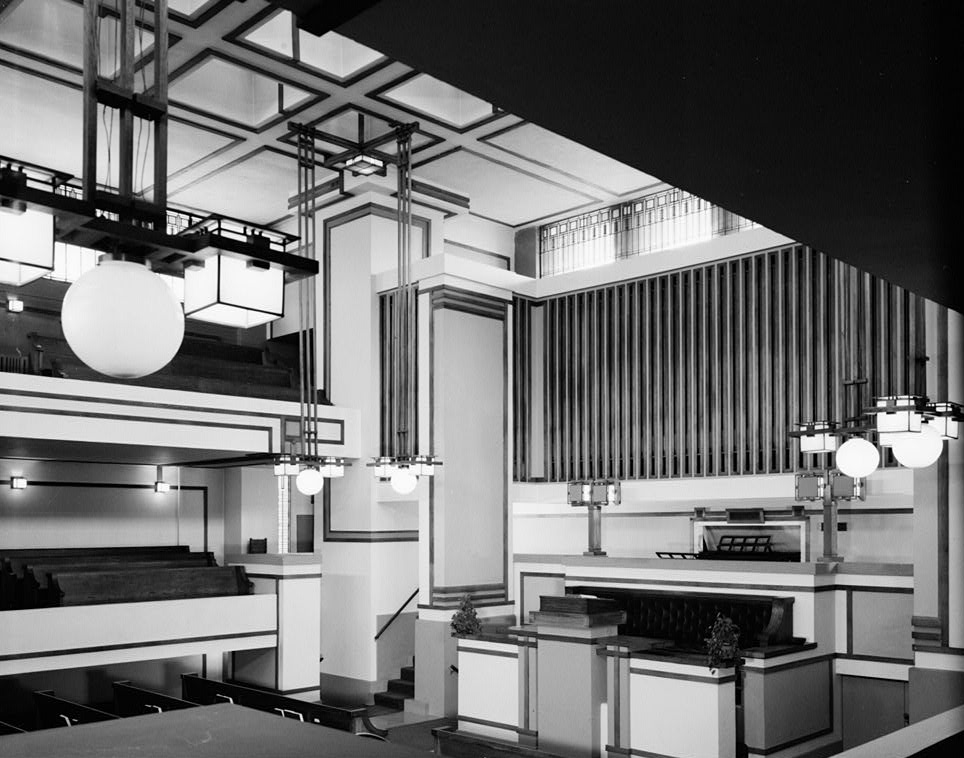
Historic American Buildings Survey photograph of the pulpit

The pews in the auditorium are variants of a mass-produced model of pews manufactured by the American Seating Company. On three sides of the main floor are raised pews, which seat 54 people each; they are raked, sloping down toward the pulpit. The layout also allows audience members to face each other. Exits from either side of the pulpit lead directly to the entrance pavilion. This eliminated the need for congregants to turn away from the pulpit to leave, as was customary in older churches, and it allowed congregants to mingle with the pastor or other speakers at the pulpit. According to architectural critic Blair Kamin, the layout makes it so that "one enters as an individual and leaves as a member of a community". The exit doors are normally closed during services. Since 2017, there has been a video screen behind the pulpit.

The balcony is about 13.5 feet (4.1 m) or two units above the ground and also surrounds the auditorium on three sides. The balcony has 153 seats in total, which are more steeply raked than those on the main level. The balcony is illuminated by spherical lamps, and there are wooden bands on the balcony's railings and on the soffit along the balcony's underside. The architectural historian Robert Twombly wrote that the balconies gave the auditorium an intimate feel while allowing visitors to feel like they were part of a larger "majestic whole".

===== Decorations =====
The decorations in the auditorium, such as the windows and chandeliers, are generally designed with cruciform motifs, recalling its overall shape. Generally, the lower part of the room is painted in darker shades of yellow and green, while the upper part is painted in lighter shades. The baseboards and the piers' pedestals were left unpainted, since Wright anticipated that this would give the room a more somber ambiance. Natural light is provided through ceiling skylights and clerestories, as well as the narrow slit windows. According to Wright, the windows were intended "to get a sense of a happy cloudless day into the room". Other than the slit windows and the door to the foyer, the lower part of the auditorium has no openings. Wright had designed planters or urns for the auditorium, but church officials refused to accept them. The auditorium also has several hardwood chairs, built in 2003 to replace the original Wright–designed chairs.

The auditorium's ceiling is 27 feet (8.2 m) high. The center of the ceiling is topped by amber skylights, which are surrounded by bands of wood. The roof is supported by solid concrete beams oriented east–west, while the north–south beams are of hollow concrete. Inset within this grid of beams are 25 square skylight panels. Each panel measures 4 5/6 feet (1.5 m) across, with 83 pieces of glass, and is decorated with a fork-shaped motif pointing in one of the four cardinal directions. A New York Times article likened the skylights' designs to Piet Mondrian's artwork. The space is also illuminated by overhanging spherical chandeliers flanked by cubic lamps, and the perimeter of the ceiling is made of oak boards.

==== Unity House ====
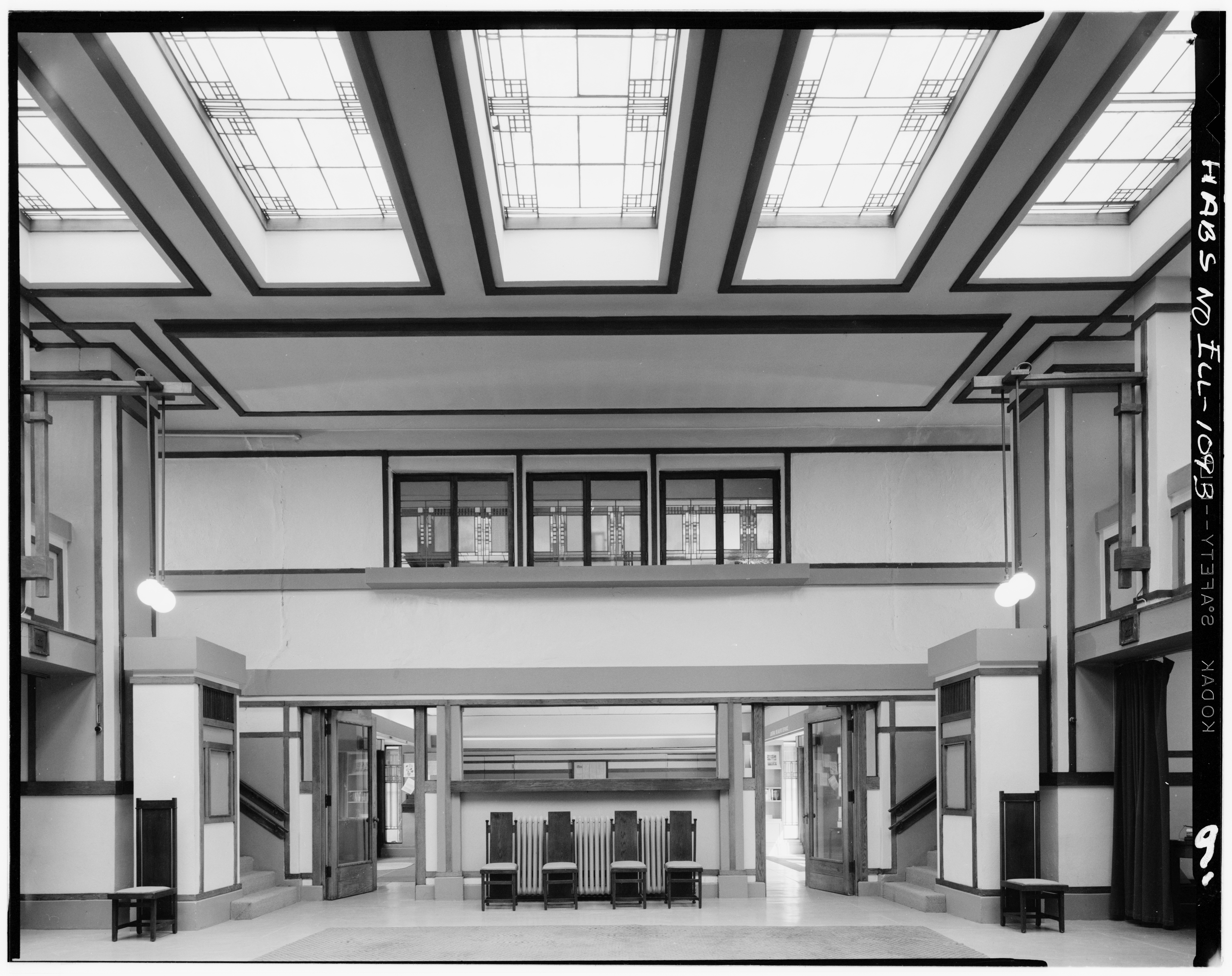
Interior of Unity House, looking north toward the temple

The interior of Unity House is painted in various shades of green, yellow, and brown. Unity House's primary interior space measures about 82 5/6 by 27 1/6 feet (25.2 by 8.3 m) across, corresponding to approximately 12 by 4 units. There is a square hall at the center, measuring about 30 feet (9.1 m) or 33 5/6 feet (10.3 m) on each side. There are balconies to the west and east of the central hall, on the same story as the auditorium's lower seating level. The balconies are supported by I-beams and contain small columns with wooden sconces, in addition to railings with wood strips. The columns have vertical wood strips along their shafts and horizontal wood strips at their capitals. The spaces under each balcony are illuminated by spherical lamps. The balconies and the spaces beneath them were originally used as classrooms.

There are square closets at each corner of Unity House's main room, measuring about 1 unit wide. On the southern wall of the central hall is a recess with a fireplace measuring about 13 1/6 feet (4.0 m) wide; this feature recalled many of Wright's residential designs, which also had central fireplaces. On the northern wall, there are three casement windows facing the pastor's study.

Unity House primarily receives natural light from skylights in the ceiling. The roof trusses are supported by eight columns arranged in a 2×4 grid. The ceiling is divided into rectangular coffers measuring 15 by 4.5 feet (4.6 by 1.4 m) across. Each coffer has a skylight with four glass panes, which are either opaque or tinted in various shades of yellow, green, and brown. There are seven skylights in total, all of which are surrounded by wood strips. Rectangular and square motifs, reminiscent of the floor plans, are used in the skylights.

=== Mechanical features ===
Unity Temple originally had a coal-fired steam boiler, in addition to concrete ducts that were supposed to distribute heat. The ducts proved ineffective at carrying air, and as such, steam radiators were installed shortly after the temple was finished. A hot-water system was also installed within half a year of the temple's completion; it remained in use through the 21st century. The coal-fired boiler was replaced with an oil-fired boiler in the early 20th century, and a gas generator was added later in the century. Since the 2010s, the church has been heated by a geothermal heating system, which consists of nine 500-foot-deep (150 m) wells on the lawn just north of the church. This system includes ice-storage space and a set of geothermal wells.

== Clergy, services, and programs ==
=== Clergy ===
As of 2025, Roger Bertschausen is the senior minister at Unity Temple, having joined as a "developmental minister" in 2023. The associate minister is Emily Gage, who joined as the minister of faith development in 2008. The church hosts services every Sunday at 9:00 a.m. and 10:45 a.m. In addition, it has hosted an annual meeting every May. Senior pastors and senior ministers over the years have included:

Senior pastor/minister	Start year	End year	Refs.
A. H. Sweetser	1871	1872	
J. O. M. Hewitt	1872	1875	
John W. Hinds	1875	1878	
LeGrand Powers	1878	1879	
N. S. Sage (Note: There was no official pastor from 1879 to 1881, though Sage appeared the most frequently.)	1879	1881	
H. D. L. Webster	1882	1883	
Augusta Jane Chapin	1886	1891	
Rodney F. Johonnot	1892	1910	
S. G. Dunham	c. 1910	1913	
William J. Taylor	1913	1919	
James W. Vallentyne	1919	1924	
Daniel T. Denman	1925	1932	
Frank D. Adams	1932	1945	
John Q. Parkhurst	1945	1952	
Robert M. Rice	1952	1970	
Gerald Krick	1971	c. 1980	
Charles Scot Giles	1981	1990	
Shirley Ann Ranck	1991	c. 1992	
F. Jay Deacon	1993	c. 2002	
Fern C. Stanley	2002	2003	
Alan Taylor	2003	2021	
Roger Bertschausen	2023	present	

=== Events and tours ===
Over the years, Unity Temple has been included in tours of Wright's Oak Park buildings, such as tours provided by the Frank Lloyd Wright Home and Studio Foundation (later the Frank Lloyd Wright Trust). Unity Temple is also part of the annual "Wright Plus" walking tour, which includes visits to several buildings designed by Wright. By 2017, the Frank Lloyd Wright Trust hosted tours of Unity Temple six days a week, in addition to more detailed tours once a week. During the COVID-19 pandemic, virtual tours of the temple were also hosted. Since 2018, Unity Temple has been part of the Frank Lloyd Wright Trail, a collection of 13 buildings designed by Wright in Illinois.

The church began hosting concerts in late 1973. Musicians frequently requested permission to perform there, prompting the church to launch a regular concert series in 1974. The series, which included music from a variety of genres, raised over $50,000 for the temple in its first quarter-century. The temple also hosted theatrical, ballet, and opera performances. In addition, in 1996, the church started hosting avant-garde music performances as part of its Creative and Improvised Music program, which was hosted there for two years.

Over the years, Unity Temple has hosted meetings for the local community, such as meetings for other Universalist congregations, conventions of the National Young People's Christian Union, and dinners. The church hosted a program called "Ways of Mankind" during 1954, in which members of the public were invited to listen to, and discuss, radio broadcasts about selected topics. The church has also invited guest speakers, such as in 1964 when four liberal pastors gave speeches there. Other programs at the church have included "Constructive Kids", an architectural program for primary-school children. Over the years, Unity Temple has hosted public exhibits, such as a 1963 exhibit about Wright's architecture and a 1978 exhibit of Wright's architectural drawings.

== Impact ==
When Unity Temple was completed, it differed significantly from other local churches' designs. Wright considered Unity Temple to be his first completed concrete-building design, and it was among the first major reinforced-concrete buildings constructed in the U.S. The temple is also an early example of a building with an exposed-concrete facade, contrasting with earlier concrete structures in Europe, whose surfaces were typically concealed behind cladding. Paul Gapp of the Chicago Tribune wrote retrospectively that Wright's use of concrete was "a daring risk at the time".

Unity Temple has been cited as an early example of modern architecture, with Wright citing it as his first modern-style building. The Oak Park Wednesday Journal wrote in 2017 that Unity Temple was "considered by many to be the world's first 'modern' building". According to Wright's wife Olgivanna, after the temple was finished, foreign architects copied elements of its design. Unity Temple's design has been credited with having helped inspire the European architects Le Corbusier, Walter Gropius, Ludwig Mies van der Rohe, and Peter Behrens. In addition, Unity Temple has inspired the design of structures such as the Maisonneuve Fire Station in Montreal, the Emerson Unitarian Church in Houston, and the Kunstmuseum Den Haag building in The Hague. The emphasis on materials and light in Unity Temple's design helped inspire later buildings such as Notre-Dame du Haut and the First Unitarian Church of Rochester.

=== Reception ===
==== Commentary ====
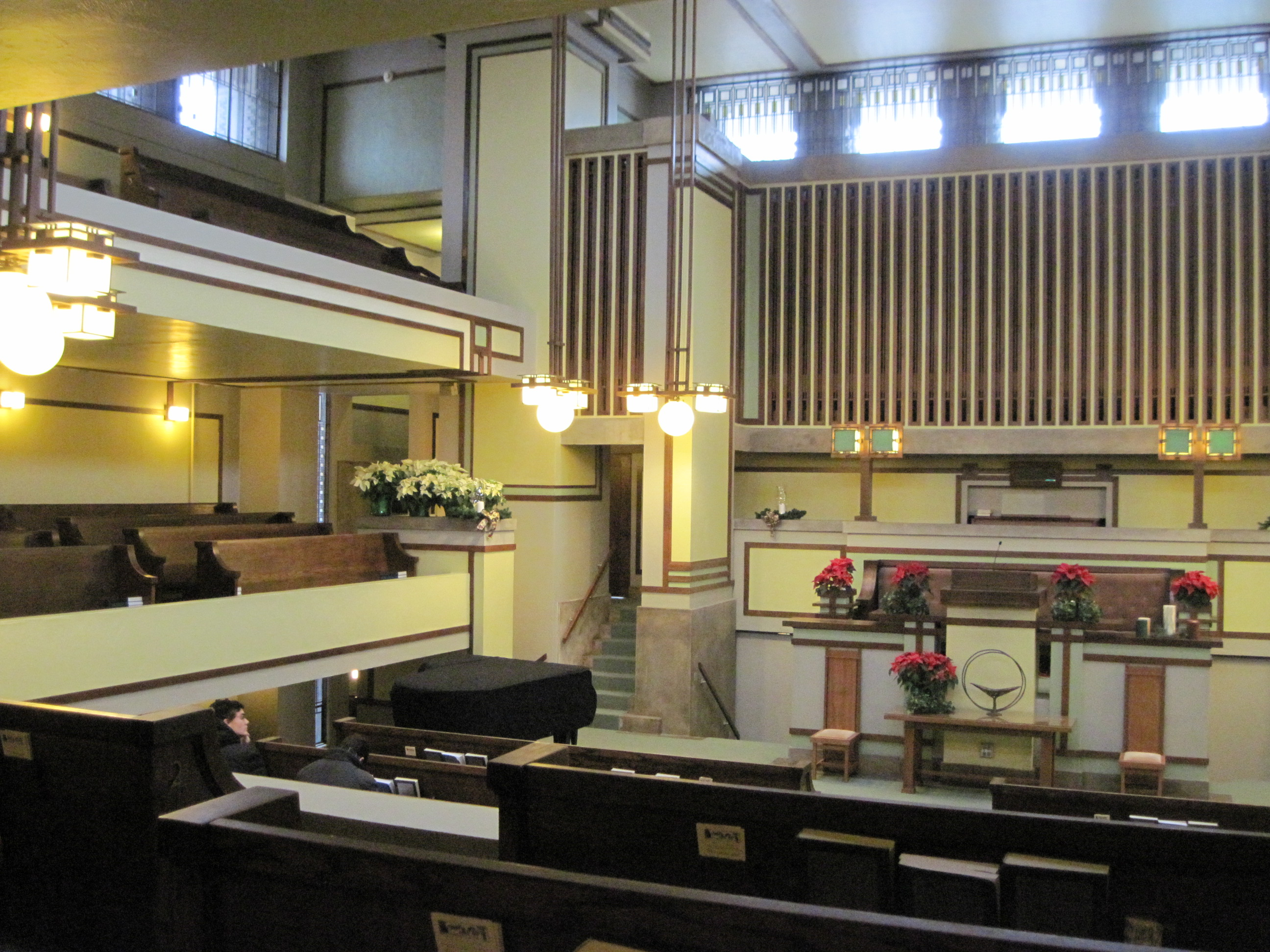
View of the auditorium from the lower seating level

Upon the temple's completion, images of the auditorium were published in Inland Architect and News Record magazine. Local newspaper Oak Leaves called it "the most radical departure in traditional church architecture ever attempted", and the same newspaper said the "severe simplicity of the exterior of the building [...] gives one little hint of the beauty of the interior". Ada May Krecker wrote for the Chicago Daily Tribune that Unity Temple's modern design represented "the present, the twentieth century, the modern spirit, thought, faith, the modern freedom, the modern ideal". Architectural Record praised the acoustics as "not sonorous and [...] only slightly reverberant". Conversely, Winthrop Kendall regarded the building as unattractive, "without a vine or a tree to relieve its massive monotony", and disappointed congregants likened the temple to a Mayan handball court.

In 1928, a writer for The Baltimore Sun described Unity Temple as one of a few buildings that expressed Wright's "idea of the thing—made to sing to heaven", while the Wausau Daily Herald said the design "gave rise to the cubical monolith". A writer for the Manchester Guardian, in 1939, described Unity Temple as one of Wright's "pedigree buildings". A St. Louis Post-Dispatch article in 1961 said Unity Temple still "looks quite fresh and contemporary today", and The Buffalo News likened the building to a "visiting spaceship" in 1981. The architectural historian Vincent Scully called it "small, yet large" and one of the nation's most beautiful buildings. After the auditorium's interior restoration was completed in the 1980s, a Boston Globe editor said the auditorium was "almost as shocking as the restoration of the Sistine Chapel". The architectural critic Paul Goldberger perceived Unity Temple as representing "a kind of symbolic gathering and communal presence, monumental dignity in a public place", calling it one of "the greatest religious structures" of the 20th century. A writer for The Chronicle of Higher Education in 1996 contrasted Unity Temple's "blocky" massing with the low-roofed design of Robie House on Chicago's South Side.

David M. Sokol, in his 2008 book The Noble Room, wrote that the temple's "majesty and importance" was partially derived from the fact that it was not arranged as typical church buildings had been. A writer for The Washington Post wrote that the building may have been one of Wright's favorite designs because it was "imposing yet elegant". After the temple's renovation was finished in 2017, a Curbed writer said the building's imposing concrete facade "belies what's inside", while a Chicago Tribune writer called the auditorium "magnificent sanctuary noted for its high skylights of amber-tinted leaded glass". Blair Kamin wrote for The Wall Street Journal in 2025 that the temple's exterior was "monolithic, not monotonous" because of its use of textured concrete and geometric motifs, while "the sanctuary is as serene as architecture gets". The next year, Chicago Tribune writer Edward Keegan wrote that Unity Temple's sanctuary "remains one of the most stunning rooms in the world".

==== Rankings and awards ====
Unity Temple has also received architectural accolades. In 1959, the American Institute of Architects (AIA) deemed Unity Temple as one of 17 buildings designed by Wright that merited the highest levels of architectural preservation. A 1991 poll in Architectural Record magazine ranked Unity Temple as one of the 10 most significant buildings in the United States from the previous century. The temple's 2017 restoration received several awards, including the AIA's Crombie Taylor Award, the World Monuments Fund's Modernism Prize, the Urban Land Institute's Vision Award, and the Richard H. Driehaus Foundation's Preservation Award.

=== Media ===
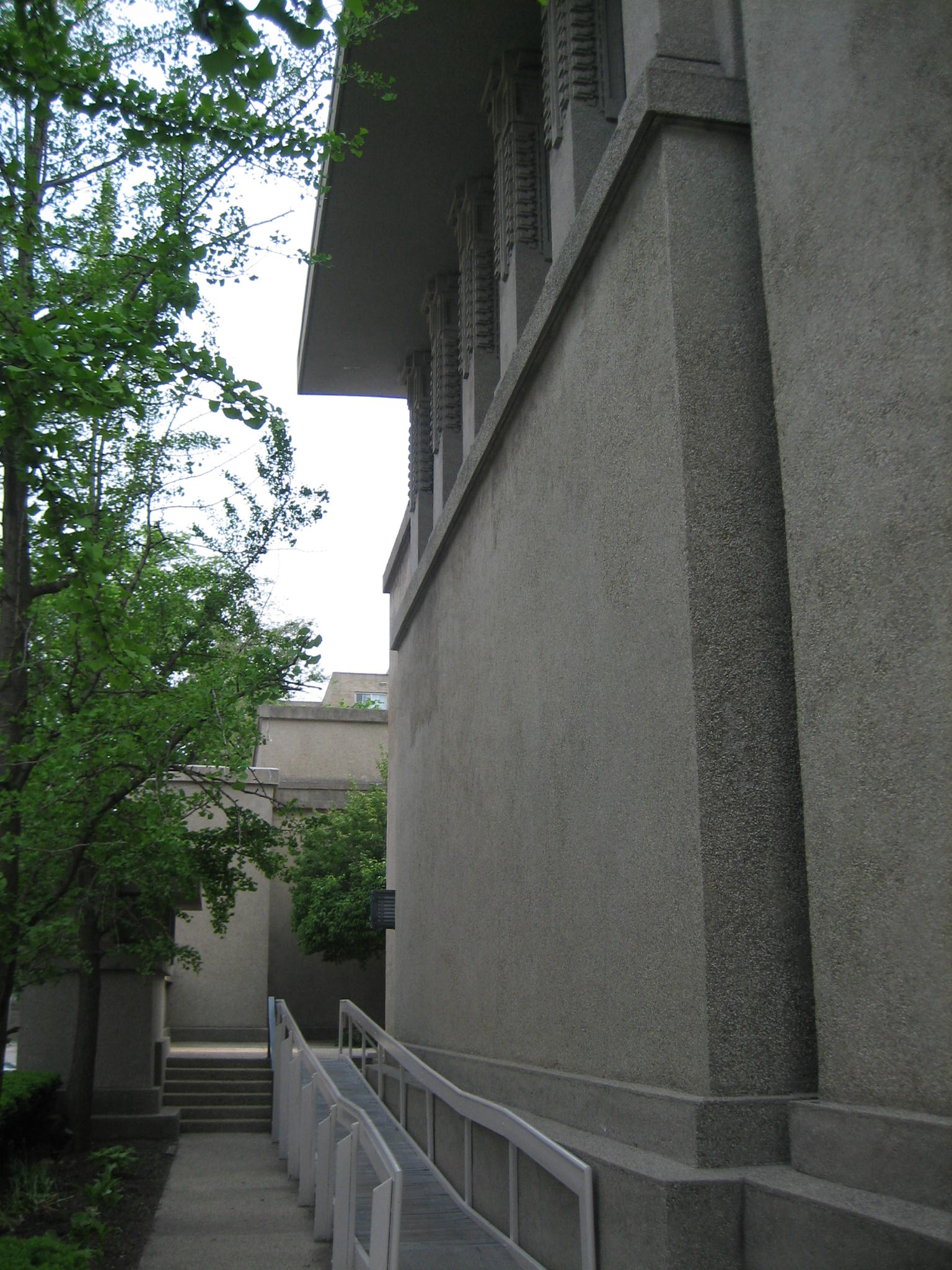
Side view of Unity Temple's facade

Wright's building has been the subject of several books. Unity Temple was detailed in Ernst Wasmuth's 1910 Wasmuth Portfolio. The historian Joseph Siry wrote a book about the church's architecture in 1996, while Robert McCarter published another book the following year with photographs of the temple. Patrick F. Cannon published a book about the temple through the Unity Temple Restoration Foundation in 2009, which received an accolade from the Independent Publisher Book Awards in 2023.

The Library of Congress acquired photographs and documents about Unity Temple in 1967. Additionally, the Museum of Modern Art (MoMA) in New York displayed images of the temple in 1965 and 1988. Local photographer Redd Griffin created a slideshow with images of Unity Temple in the 1970s, and drawings of the temple have also been displayed at the Phoenix Art Museum in Arizona and at the Oak Park Library. The temple was detailed in the Scottish filmmaker Murray Grigor's 1982 documentary about Wright's Oak Park buildings. In addition, the 2020 documentary Unity Temple: Frank Lloyd Wright's Modern Masterpiece, produced by Lauren Levine and narrated by Brad Pitt, details the temple's renovation.

=== Landmark designations ===
Unity Temple was added to the National Register of Historic Places (NRHP) in April 1970; such a designation allowed properties to receive federal funds for restoration. The building was designated a National Historic Landmark on December 30, 1970, and was re-added to the NRHP at that time. A plaque commemorating the National Historic Landmark designation was installed in June 1971. Oak Park officials considered including Unity Temple as part of a municipal historic district in 1971. When the district was created the next year, however, it excluded the temple. The temple was included in the Ridgeland–Oak Park Historic District, a NRHP district designated in 1983.

The United States Department of the Interior nominated Unity Temple and nine other Wright–designed buildings to the World Heritage List in 2015; the buildings had previously been nominated in 2008. UNESCO added eight properties, including Unity Temple, to the World Heritage List in July 2019 under the title "The 20th-Century Architecture of Frank Lloyd Wright".

== See also ==
- List of Frank Lloyd Wright works
- List of National Historic Landmarks in Illinois
- List of World Heritage Sites in the United States
- National Register of Historic Places listings in Cook County, Illinois
- Unitarian Meeting House, Shorewood Hills, Wisconsin
- Unitarian Universalist Association
