= Chapin (surname) =

Chapin is a surname. Notable people with the surname include:

- Aaron Lucius Chapin (1817–1892), US minister and college president
- Alaric B. Chapin (1848–1924), Union hero in American Civil War
- Alfred C. Chapin (1848–1936), US politician
- Alice Chapin, (1857–1934), militant suffragette and silent film actress
- Amzi Chapin (1768–1835), US cabinetmaker, singing-school teacher and shapenote composer
- Andy Chapin (1951–1985), US musician
- Anna Alice Chapin (1880–1920), US author
- Arthur Chapin (1868–1943), US politician
- Augusta Jane Chapin (1836–1905), US religious figure and women's rights activist
- Billy Chapin (1943–2016), US actor
- Charles Chapin (1858–1930), US newspaper editor, convicted murderer ("The Rose Man")
- Charles V. Chapin (1856–1941), US physician and activist in public health
- Chester W. Chapin (1798–1883), US politician
- Clifford Chapin (born 1988), US voice actor working for Funimation
- Cornelia Van Auken Chapin (1893–1972), US sculptor
- Darrin Chapin (born 1966), US baseball player
- Dwight Chapin (born 1940), US politician
- Edward Payson Chapin (1831–1863), Union Officer in the American Civil War
- Edwin Hubbell Chapin (1814–1880), US preacher and religious writer
- Edwin N. Chapin (1823–1896), US postmaster and newspaper publisher
- Ela Chapin, American politician from Vermont
- Eliphalet Chapin (1741–1807), US cabinetmaker
- Esther Maria Lewis Chapin (1871–1959), US society figure
- F. Stuart Chapin III (born 1944), US educator
- Francis Chapin (1899–1965), US artist
- F. Stuart Chapin (1888–1974), US educator and sociologist
- Frederic L. Chapin (1929–1987), US diplomat
- Frederick H. Chapin (1852–1900), US businessman, mountaineer, photographer, amateur geologist
- Graham H. Chapin (1799–1843), US politician
- Harold Chapin (1886–1915), British playwright
- Harry Chapin (1942–1981), US musician
- Helen Burwell Chapin (1892–1950), US scholar of East Asian art
- Henry Chapin (1811–1878), US politician and judge
- Herman M. Chapin (1823–1879), US politician
- James Ormsbee Chapin (1887–1975), US artist
- James Chapin (1889–1964), US ornithologist
- Jen Chapin (f. 2000s), US musician
- Jim Chapin (1919–2009), US musician
- John Putnam Chapin (1810–1864), US politician
- John R. Chapin (f. 1800s), US artist and illustrator
- Lauren Chapin (1945–2026), US actress
- Linda Chapin (f. 2000s), US politician
- Mary W. Chapin (1820–1899), US educator and college president
- Miles Chapin (born 1954), US actor
- Nettie Sanford Chapin (1830–1901), US teacher, historian, author, newspaper publisher, suffragist
- Ralph Chapin (1915–2000), US businessman
- Roger Chapin (born 1933), US businessman and activist
- Roy D. Chapin (1880–1936), US industrialist
- Roy D. Chapin Jr. (1915–2001), US industrialist
- Samuel Chapin (1598–1675), US founder of Springfield, Massachusetts
- Sandra Chapin (born 1932), US personality, wife of Harry Chapin
- Schuyler Chapin (1923–2009), US opera director
- Selden Chapin (1899–1963), US diplomat
- Steve Chapin, (born c. 1944), US musician
- Thomas Chapin (1957–1998), US musician
- Tom Chapin (born 1945), US musician
