= Elmina Springer =

American suffragist

- Springer, from a 1904 newspaper
- Born: Esther Elmina Skiff; November 8, 1831; Nelson Township, Ohio, U.S.
- Died: December 13, 1912 (aged 81); Chicago, Illinois, U.S.
- Other name: Elmira Springer
- Occupations: Educator, philanthropist, clubwoman, suffragist
- Relatives: Nettie Sanford Chapin (sister); Edwin N. Chapin (brother-in-law)

Esther Elmina Skiff Springer (November 8, 1831 – December 13, 1912), also known as Elmira Springer, was an American educator, suffragist, and philanthropist, based in Chicago. She was called "probably the ablest exponent of the right of women to vote in this country" in a 1900 newspaper.

== Early life ==
Skiff was born in Nelson Township, Ohio, the daughter of Stephen Skiff and Lucy Jane Bierce Skiff. "I have been a woman suffragist all my life. I go back a thousand years," she declared in 1900. "I did a great many things the little good girls of my time didn't do. I guess people thought I was strange." Her sister Nettie Sanford Chapin was a noted writer, newspaper publisher, and suffragist.

== Career ==
As a young woman, Springer was a school teacher, an abolitionist, and a friend of Susan B. Anthony. She lived in Iowa and Pennsylvania before moving to Chicago in 1885. She was active in the Woman's Relief Corps of Illinois, raising and donating funds for cemetery plots and "an elegant monument" in Elmwood, for 225 impoverished Union Army widows. She was chair of the Cook County Woman's Republican Committee.

The Woman's Relief Corps nominated Springer for a seat on the University of Illinois Board of Trustees in 1904, with Frances Dickinson and Ida Wells Barnett speaking in favor of her nomination. "She is a broad-minded, well educated, cultured woman, devoting herself to current affairs of the day," explained a 1904 newspaper article. Her bid for a trustee seat was "spirited" but ultimately unsuccessful.

In 1900 Springer attended the convention of the National American Woman Suffrage Association. She was a member of the Board of Lady Managers for the Pan-American Exposition in Buffalo in 1901. In 1906 Springer announced a $1000 donation to fund prizes for suffrage orators at the college level. She was honorary vice-president of Chicago's North Side Suffrage Association in 1908, on an executive board with Ada May Krecker and Ellen Martin Henrotin, and second vice-president of the Illinois Equal Suffrage Associations.

== Personal life ==
Skiff married inventor Theodore G. Springer in 1858. They had a daughter, Sylvia. Her husband died in 1896, her daughter died in 1902, and she died in 1912, at the age of 81, in Chicago.
