= Edwin Chapin =

Edwin Chapin may refer to:

- Edwin Hubbell Chapin (1814–1880), American preacher and editor of the Christian Leader
- Edwin N. Chapin (1823–1896), American postmaster and newspaper publisher
