= Chapin (given name) =

Chapin is the given name of:

- Chapin Hall (1816–1879), Republican US Representative from Pennsylvania
- Chapin A. Harris (1806–1860), American physician and dentist
- Chapin Rose (born 1973), Republican member of the Illinois Senate

== See also ==
- C. Chapin Cutler (1914–2002), American electrical engineer
