= Chapin Block =

Historic building in Massachusetts, US

- U.S. National Register of Historic Places
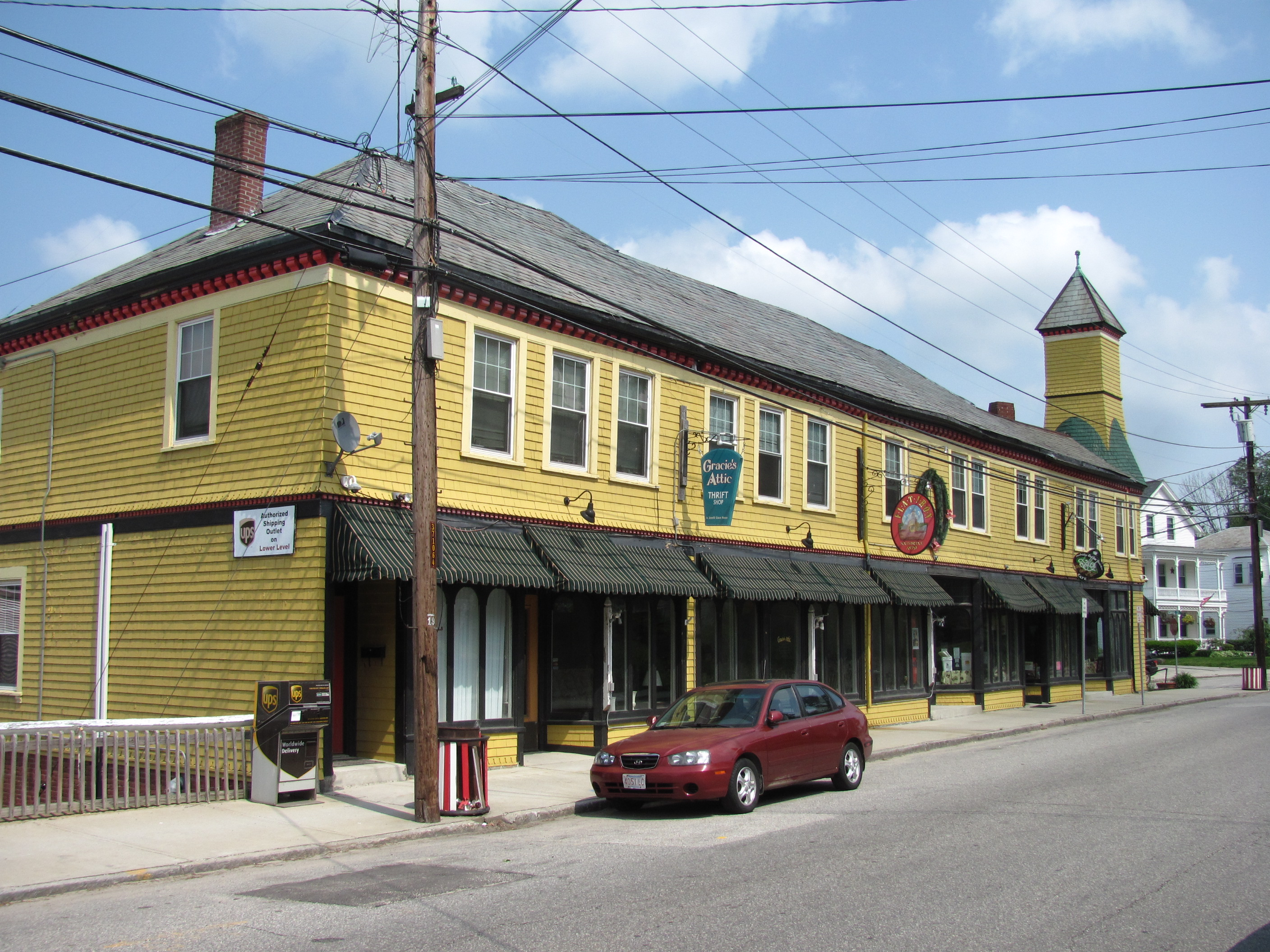
- Chapin Block

- Location within Massachusetts Location within the United States
- Location: 208-222 Hamilton, Southbridge, Massachusetts
- Coordinates: 42°4′48″N 72°2′8″W
- Built: 1888
- Architectural style: Shingle Style
- MPS: Southbridge MRA
- NRHP reference No.: 89000558
- Added to NRHP: June 22, 1989

The Chapin Block is a historic commercial building at 208-222 Hamilton Street in Southbridge, Massachusetts. Built in 1888, it is the only Shingle style commercial building in Southbridge. It was listed on the National Register of Historic Places in 1989.

== Description and history ==
The Chapin Block is located in Globe Village, a predominantly residential area just north of Southbridge's downtown, occupying a narrow plot of land at the junction of Hamilton and Crane Streets. The building is set to advantage on the oddly-shaped narrow triangular lot, giving the building a flatiron appearance with a rounded point. It is a two-story wood-frame structure, with a small tower (that once held a clock) at the point were Hamilton and Crane Streets meet. It is finished in wooden shingles, and has a modillioned cornice. There are four storefronts on the front of the building (facing Hamilton Street), each with plate glass windows flanking recessed entries. This layout dates to the early 20th century. On the Crane Street side, the building's brick basement is exposed, providing a series of building entrances at that level. The first floor on that side is largely plain, while the second floor has a projecting balcony.

The block was built in 1888 by Francis Chapin, a local bank officer and real estate developer, and provided local shops for the area residential neighborhood, and a meeting hall on the second floor. Early occupants of the retail spaces included a candy store, barber, tobacconist, and clothing store. It was sold by Chapin shortly after its construction to J. J. Delahanty, owner of a local furniture store; it remained in his family until 1972.

== See also ==
- National Register of Historic Places listings in Southbridge, Massachusetts
- National Register of Historic Places listings in Worcester County, Massachusetts
