= Nettie Sanford Chapin =

American historian (1830–1901)

- Born: Henrietta Maria Skiff; March 28, 1830; Portage County, Ohio, U.S.
- Died: August 20, 1901 (aged 71); Marshalltown, Iowa, U.S.
- Resting place: Riverside Cemetery, Marshalltown, Iowa
- Other name: Nettie
- Occupations: teacher; historian; author; newspaper publisher; suffragist; activist
- Spouses: Daniel Sanford (m. 1863; died 1873); Edwin N. Chapin (m. 1886–1896)
- Relatives: Elmina Springer (sister)
- Writing career
- Pen name: E. N. Chapin
- Language: English

Nettie Sanford Chapin (née, Skiff; after first marriage, Sanford; after second marriage, Chapin; pseudonym, E. N. Chapin; March 28, 1830 – August 20, 1901) was a 19th-century American teacher, historian, author, newspaper publisher, suffragist, and activist. Chapin wrote mostly prose. She also wrote on Iowa history, and published several small books herself. While residing at Washington, D.C., for several winters, she wrote concerning society and fashionable Washington circles. In 1875, she began the publication of The Ladies Bureau, the first newspaper published west of Chicago by a woman. Chapin served as chair of the National Committee of the National Equal Rights Party.

== Early life and education ==
Henrietta Maria (nickname, "Nettie") Skiff was born in Portage County, Ohio, March 28, 1830. Her parents were Stephen Skiff and Lucy Bierce Skiff. Stephen's parents were Jeremiah Skiff (b. 1770) and Esther Ayres Skiff (1770–1841). Chapin's siblings included Esther, Dimmis, Henry, Orin, and Nancy. Chapin came to Iowa with her father's family in August 1856, and settled in Malaka Township, Jasper County, Iowa, the township being named by Chapin and her father.

== Career ==
=== Iowa ===
She taught school in Newton, Iowa in the fall of 1856 and the winter following, on going to the village to be examined for teaching, she got lost on the prairie in a snowstorm. Her horse, after wandering around for about four hours, with a little sled, finally came along to a fence along a farm. When she presented herself to the county examiner, he remarked, "I guess you will do; pretty plucky girl anyhow," and she received her certificate.

She helped organize the first society for the purpose of sending sanitary supplies to the Union soldiers in the field during the Civil War. In Newton, she was the first secretary of the local organization of the United States Sanitary Commission as early as the spring of 1862.

She married Daniel Sanford of Edenville, later Rhodes, September 24, 1863. Daniel was a returned Californian. He lived at Des Moines, Iowa six months, and then moved to Marshalltown, December 1, 1864. They had two children, Philip Hathaway Sanford (1866-1867) and May Adalaide (b. 1868).

Chapin served as president of the Marshall County Orphans' Home Society in 1865, when the county raised US$1,100 for the Orphans' Home state fair, held on the grounds of the high school. In the same year, she also lectured on women's suffrage.

In December 1867, Chapin made her first literary venture by publishing a history of Marshall County, Iowa. It was a small book and she paid US$750 for it. It had some errors and was written under trying circumstances, but a generous public forgave and it sold fairly well.

In the fall of 1870, there was a good deal of discussion on woman's suffrage. A state convention was held at Mt. Pleasant, Iowa and Austin Perry Lowery of Des Moines represented Marshall County. He secured her election as one of the vice president of the state organization. She lectured some on the question and was severely ridiculed by the newspapers. Several women, friends of the movement, Mrs. Lot Thomas, Mrs. Ehwalan, Mrs. Rachel Brown, Mrs. Delos Arnold, and Mrs. Mary Holmes, called a meeting at Rice's Hall, which was then used for public purposes, over the Whitton & Whithead store. She was made president of the society.

In January 1873, Mr. Sanford died after an extended illness.

In 1874, Chapin published a pamphlet entitled the "History of Jasper County" and in the city library of Des Moines, another pamphlet of 20 pages, "The History of Polk County". In October 1875, she began the publication of the first newspaper published west of Chicago by a woman. She called it The Ladies Bureau, and was afterwards changed in name to The Woman's Kingdom.

=== California and Washington, D.C. ===
In the fall of 1877, Chapin went to California on account of her daughter's health, and in 1878, at Los Angeles, began the publication of the San Gabriel Valley News. After conducting that property at a loss for a time, she returned to Marshalltown, with barely US$20. For years, she had been acting as special correspondent and during the years 1871 10 1872, she had written up nine towns and villages in Iowa for outside newspapers. In August and September 1878, she was engaged as the private secretary of Matilda Fletcher, in Chicago, and acted as correspondent for Iowa newspapers.

In December 1879, Chapin went to Washington, D.C., and obtained a position in the fourth auditor's office, United States Department of the Treasury. During her stay in Washington, she corresponded to the Davenport Gazette, The Des Moines Register, Sioux City Journal, and Marshalltown Times. She also wrote for The Annals of Iowa. In 1882, at the James A. Garfield memorial fair in Washington, D.C., she was vice-president for Iowa at the place assigned for the state. In May 1886, she resigned her position in the Treasury Department and returned to Iowa.

=== Return to Iowa ===
On June 17, 1886, she married Hon. Edwin N. Chapin (1823–1896), editor and publisher of the Marshall County Times. The wedding took place at the Malaka farm, Jasper County, the home of her aged mother. He was widely known as an Iowa pioneer journalist.

On May 16, 1887, in Des Moines, Iowa, Chapin was the Chair of the National Committee of the National Equal Rights Party, which nominated for President of the United States, Belva Ann Lockwood, of Washington, D.C., and for Vice-president, Alfred H. Love, of Philadelphia. The convention adopted a platform favoring woman suffrage, pensions for all needy soldiers and sailors, protective tariff, with free sugar and lumber, and repeal of tax on whisky and tobacco, and against unrestricted emigration. In the same year, she published a book entitled, Life at the National Capital; and she was elected as a national delegate by the Woman's Relief Corps (W.R.C.) to the convention in St. Louis, Missouri.

In 1888, the women of the Woman's National Press Association made her a vice-president for Iowa. She had been its treasurer and a charter member from its organization, in 1883, at Washington. In 1890, she wrote The Iowa Cranks, but on the advice of Rev. F. E. Judd, then rector of St. Paul's Episcopal church, she published it under her husband's name. It was anti-prohibition and considered an unpopular theme, but sold well, however.

In 1891, at the state convention held in Grinnell, Iowa, she was elected national delegate to the convention of the ladies of the Grand Army of the Republic (G.A.R.) held in Detroit, Michigan. At the state convention held in Ottumwa, Iowa, May 12, 1892, she was elected state department president for Iowa, Ladies of the G.A.R.. At the Woman's Congress at Washington, D.C., in February 1891, she was a state delegate for Iowa, and in 1892, she was elected president of the Marshall County World's Fair Association, whose efforts were a failure. She also served, at about that time, in various capacities in local organizations. In 1893, she was engaged in the publication of The Pioneer, a monthly paper devoted to Marshall County history, and that was her last publishing venture, aside from outside newspaper correspondence.

Chapin represented Iowa at the National American Woman Suffrage Association convention of 1893. For many years, she was also affiliated with the Iowa branch of the Woman's Christian Temperance Union.

== Later life and death ==
She lived quietly during her later years, since her health began to fail. Chapin died at Marshalltown, Iowa, August 20, 1901, due to valvular heart disease, and was buried at Riverside Cemetery in that city. Her obituary in the Evening Times Republican stated: "Probably no other Marshalltown woman attained such prominence as did she in her prime and some of her literary ventures, particularly those of a historical nature and referring to pioneer days in Iowa, will live forever."

== Selected works ==
=== Books ===
- Central Iowa farms and herds, by Nettie Sanford, 1873, Newton, Iowa)
- Pioneer Life in Iowa: Early Sketches of Polk County, from 1842 to 1860 by Mrs. Nettie Sanford, 1874, Newton, Iowa, Charles A. Clark.
- American Court Gossip: Or, Life at the National Capitol, by Mrs. E. N. Chapin, 1887)
- Iowa Cranks; or, The beauties of prohibition, a political novel, by E. N. Chapin (using her husband's name as a pseudonym), 1890

=== Pamphlets ===
- "History of Jasper County", 1874
- "The History of Polk County"
