= Chapin, Idaho =

Unincorporated community in the United States

Coordinates: 43°38′36″N 111°06′39″W

Chapin is an unincorporated community in Teton County, in the U.S. state of Idaho.

== History ==
A post office called Chapin was established in 1896, and remained in operation until 1912. According to tradition, the community was named after one Mr. Chapin, a pioneer citizen.

Chapin's population was 125 in 1909.
