= Construction News (American publication) =

- Categories: Construction
- Frequency: Weekly
- Publisher: The Construction News Company
- Founded: 1900
- Country: United States
- Based in: Chicago, Illinois
- Language: English

Construction News was an American weekly journal published in Chicago, Illinois. It was established in the late 19th century and published by The Construction News Company.

== History ==
In 1914, its editor was Harry W. Culbertson, while its news editor was R. B. Rice.

The publication was renamed American Contractor.
