= Ada May Krecker =

American writer

- Krecker, from a 1908 newspaper
- Born: 1872; Lebanon, Pennsylvania, U.S.
- Died: September 11, 1932 (age 60); East Orange, New Jersey, U.S.
- Other names: Ada du Rosaire, Audrey Marie Krecker
- Occupations: Writer, suffragist, countess

Ada May Krecker du Rosaire (1872 – September 11, 1932) was an American writer, journalist, and suffragist, based in Chicago. Later in life she married a French count.

== Early life and education ==
Krecker was born in Lebanon, Pennsylvania, and raised in Japan, the daughter of American missionaries Frederick William Krecker and Elizabeth Landis Overholser Krecker. Her father was a medical doctor and ordained minister who served in the Union Army during the American Civil War; he died in Tokyo in 1883. Her brother Frederick H. Krecker became a zoology and botany professor at Ohio University, and her brother Preston S. Krecker became a financial reporter. She graduated from Wellesley College in 1895.

== Career ==
Krecker's had her first published poem in 1882, when she was ten years old. She wrote for the Chicago Tribune from 1904 to 1911. She was a member of the Illinois Woman's Press Association. and spoke to the a 1907 meeting of the Chicago Press League. She was a temperance supporter, and president of the North Side Suffrage Association.

Krecker's interests lay in workers' well-being, and speculations on the large-scale issues of human life. She wrote a series of future-facing essays for the Chicago Tribune, with titles including "When the Coal is Gone Wind and Wave Will Turn Wheels of World", "Will the World Ever Run Down Like a Clock? Some Say It May" and "Shall We Fly to Other Worlds?" She wrote for Emma Goldman's anarchist magazine Mother Earth.

== Publications ==
=== Chicago Tribune ===
- "Why People Like to Work; Only True Pleasure in Life" (1907)
- "Seven Great Wonders of Science and Industry Perfected in 1907" (1907)
- "When the Coal is Gone Wind and Wave Will Turn Wheels of World" (1908)
- "World's Best Work Done by Old Men Whose Accomplishments Make an Age Limit Absurd" (1908)
- "Will the World Ever Run Down Like a Clock? Some Say It May" (1908)
- "Beauty is a Need of Life" (1908)
- "Music and Poetry Make Toil Easier and Cheer the Wearied Worker's Heart" (1908)
- "How the Poorest Families Fight to Keep the Wolf from the Door" (1908)
- "Do the Vegetarians Live Longer, Work Harder and Have Better Brains than the Meat Eaters?" (1909)
- "Helpfulness Has Utilitarian Virtues" (1909)
- "Modern Ideal is to Unite Humanity" (1909)
- "Present the Age of Young Men; Will Future Be of the Old?" (1910)
- "Shall We Fly to Other Worlds?" (1911)

=== Elsewhere ===
- "The Canterbury Tales", "Waking Time" and "Winter Night" (1892, 1893, poems)
- "The Wedding Day" (1900, short story)
- "Old Lefaire as Othello" (1902, short story)
- Fuzzy Four Footed Folks (1902)
- The Beautiful Life of Mrs. Elizabeth Krecker (1905)
- "Report of the Press Committee" (1906)
- "Industry Kills and Maims a Hundred Times More Men than Fall in Battle" (1908)
- "Facts the Same However Expressed" (1910)
- "People Dwelling Together as One Nation" (1911)
- "The Passing of the Family" (1912)

== Personal life ==
In 1921, Krecker married Louis Henri Polaise du Rosaire, and became a countess. She died in 1932, at the age of 60, at her sister's home in East Orange, New Jersey.
