= Augusta Jane Chapin =

American Universalist minister (1836–1905)

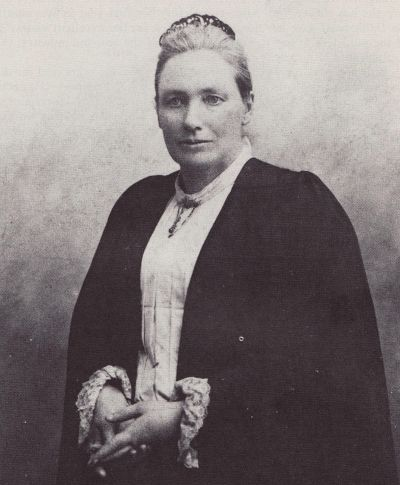
Augusta Jane Chapin

Augusta Jane Chapin (July 16, 1836 – June 30, 1905) was an American Universalist minister, educator and activist for women's rights. She was born in Lakeville, New York, the eldest of eleven children, to Almon Morris Chapin and Jane Pease. She was one of only a few women's speakers at the Parliament of the World's Religions that took place at the Columbian Exposition in Chicago in 1893. She had a long preaching and teaching career around the Midwestern U.S., as well as Pennsylvania, New York, Oregon, and California.

== Education ==
In 1852, at the age of 16, she began to attend the Olivet College. On December 7, 1864, in Lansing, Michigan, she became one of the first women to be ordained as a minister. Not accepted in her previous years when she applied, at age 50, Chapin was finally able to enroll at the University of Michigan, and was awarded a Master of Arts degree in June 1884.

In 1893 Chapin was conferred an honorary Doctor of Divinity degree by Lombard University; the first ever awarded to a woman in America. In 1893, she chaired the Woman's Committee of the Parliament of the World's Religions as part of the World's Columbian Exposition that took place in Chicago from May 1, 1893 – Oct 30, 1893. She was a charter member of the American Woman Suffrage Association.

== Career ==
Chapin served many congregations during her ministerial career: itinerancy in Michigan, 1859–63; Bennington, Michigan, 1864–67; Mount Pleasant, Iowa, 1868; Milwaukee, Wisconsin, 1869; Iowa City, Iowa, 1870–73; Allston, Massachusetts, 1874; San Francisco, California and Oregon, 1874; Lansing, Michigan, 1875; Pittsburgh, Pennsylvania, 1875–76; Blue Island, Illinois, 1876–77; Chicago, Illinois, 1878; Aurora, Illinois, 1878–79; itinerancy in Michigan, 1880–83; Hillsdale, Michigan, 1884–85; Oak Park, Illinois, 1886–92; Omaha, Nebraska, 1894–95; and Mount Vernon, New York, 1897–1901.
