= Edwin N. Chapin =

American politician

Edwin N. Chapin (June 5, 1823 – July 29, 1896) was an American postmaster and newspaper publisher. An outspoken and fearless advocate, he was often in controversy, and on account of his aggressive and combative disposition, came to be called "Old Grizzly". Chapin was a strong character, prominent as a pioneer, alert in business, a vigorous, out-spoken, independent editor, welcoming and standing by whatever promised to benefit his state, county or city.

Chapin lived in Massachusetts twenty-seven years before he went to California in 1849. He was there for five years and returned to Massachusetts in 1854. He then removed to Iowa, and arrived in Marshall County, Iowa in June, 1855. He went to Rock Island, Illinois after a load of groceries, and also carted flour from Rock Island, which was the nearest flour-mill. In 1856, he commenced publishing the Iowa Central Journal, which he sold out to his partner, Mr. Barnhart. They started the Marshall County Times. He held the office of supervisor of Marshall County. He was appointed postmaster under President Abraham Lincoln, and was the first government officer removed by Andrew Andrew Johnson for political reasons. He was again appointed postmaster by President Ulysses S. Grant in March, 1876.

== Early life ==
Edwin N. Chapin was born in Monterey, Massachusetts, June 5, 1823. (Note: According to the Western Historical Company (1878), Chapin was born in Tyringham, Berkshire Co., Massachusetts, June 5, 1822.) After receiving a common school education, he attended an academy for a short time. O. B. Chapin, who represented Hardin County, Iowa in the Legislature, in 1874-75, was his brother.

== Career ==
For several years, he taught school. He engaged in charcoal burning for a while, disposing of the product at the blast furnaces.

In December, 1849, aware of the California Gold Rush, he started for California by way of the Isthmus of Panama, and on account of difficulties with the officers of the ship on the Pacific Ocean side, helped to take possession of it, and after several months of voyaging, arrived at San Francisco. For some four years, he was engaged in mining and other pursuits in California, returning by way of Nicaragua, shipping for New York City at Greytown, in 1854.

The following year he removed to Iowa. In 1855, he bought The Iowa Central Journal, then located at Lafayette, (later Albion), Marshall County, of Messrs. Wilson, Dunn and Tripp. Associated with him in the conduct of the paper was Mr. R. H. Barnhart. The paper was a champion of Marietta, and as Chapin had declared that he would not take the paper to the new county seat, in case of removal, he sold out his interest to his partner, who removed the paper to the new county seat. During the year 1857, Chapin settled in Marshalltown, Iowa and started The Marshall County News, which was subsequently destroyed by fire. During several years following this loss, he bought and sold The Times many times. In 1881, he was connected with The Reflector.

He held several offices of trust and responsibility during his residence in Iowa. He was a member of the board of supervisors, and postmaster of Marshalltown under President Lincoln. In 1864, he was sent to Mississippi to take the vote of the Iowa soldiers, under appointment of Governor William M. Stone. Chapin was removed from the office of postmaster in 1865 by President Johnson, for alleged "offensive partisanship", Chapin having the honor to be the first official removed by President Johnson for political reasons. Chapin was re-appointed postmaster by President Grant, in 1876.

In the development of the railroad system of Iowa, he bore a leading part, and when improvements were under consideration in Marshalltown, or in the county, he took the progressive side.

== Personal life ==
He was married in 1857 to Elizabeth Moore Moon (1821–1885), of Washington, Pennsylvania; and again in 1886 to Nettie Sanford Chapin. He died at his residence in Marshalltown, July 29, 1896.
