= Poughkeepsie Savings Bank =

Historic commercial building in New York, United States

- U.S. National Register of Historic Places
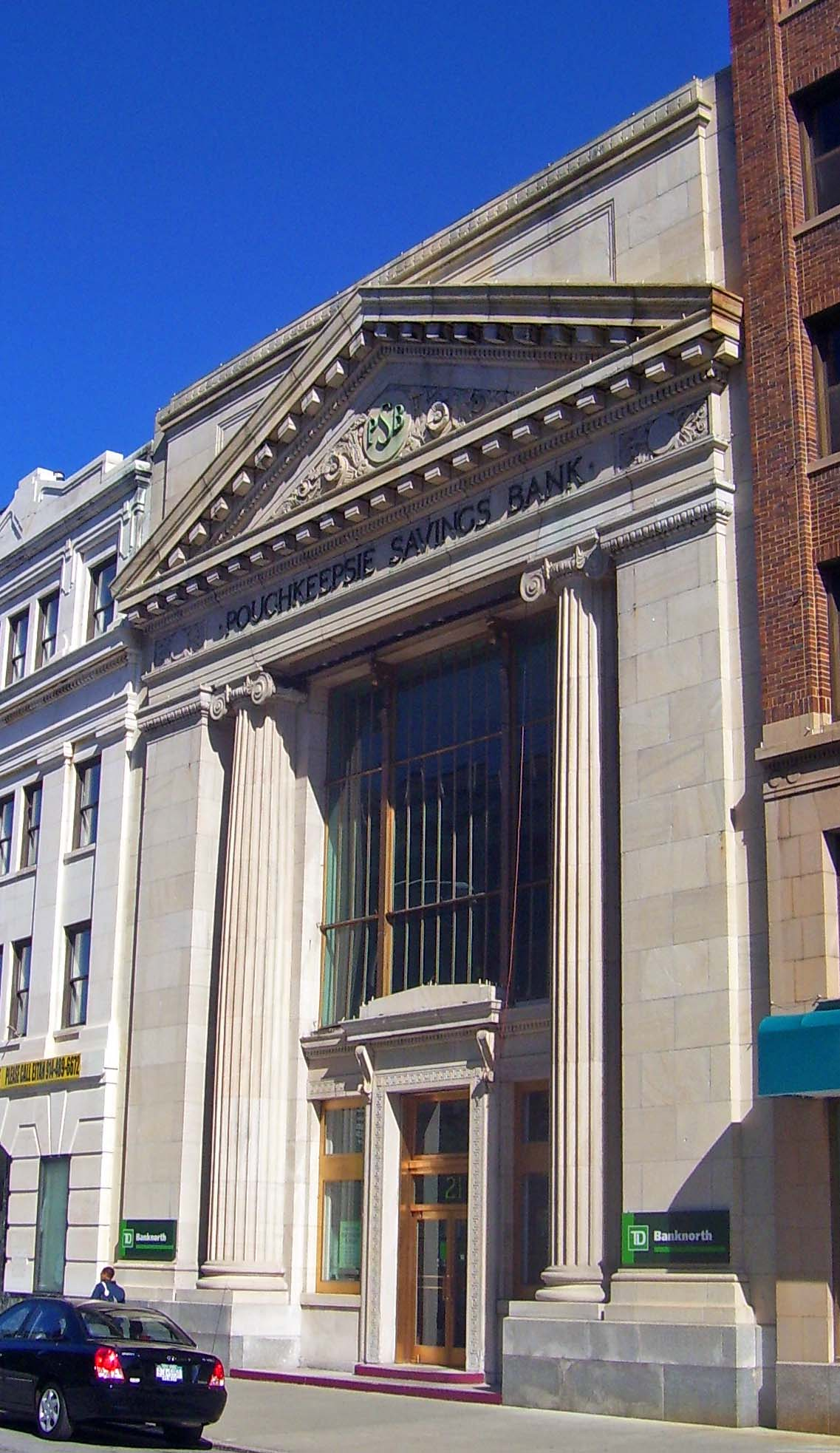
- Bank building in 2007, still in use by TD Banknorth
- Location: Poughkeepsie, NY
- Coordinates: 41°42′11″N 73°55′45″W
- Built: 1912
- Architect: Mowbray and Uffinger
- Architectural style: Classical Revival
- MPS: Poughkeepsie Multiple Resource
- NRHP reference No.: 98001445
- Added to NRHP: 1998

The Poughkeepsie Savings Bank building is located at 21-23 Market Street in the city of that name in the U.S. state of New York.

== History ==
It was the third home of that bank, the first in the city, chartered in 1831 by William Davies, on that site. After 20 years on nearby Main Street, the bank bought one of its current lots and built. In 1870 the adjacent lot was purchased and the building expanded yet again, reopening anew two years later. In 1911 the bank's success led it to commission a completely new building from the firm of Mowbray and Uffinger, who had designed many bank buildings across the Eastern states.

They delivered a Classical Revival building, with slightly trapezoidal walls reflecting the constraints of the site. Its front facade, made of Pennsylvania marble on a granite base, uses two Ionic order columns flanked by Doric pilasters. The deeply recessed entryway and vestibule is done in cast bronze and ornamental glass.

Originally the tellers' counter was a U-shaped extension from the south wall, to allow customer interaction on all three sides. In 1931, Uffinger, Foster & Bookwalter, successor firm to the original architects, was retained to modernize the floor plan, and extended the counter to enclose the building's northeast corner, but otherwise made no significant alterations. The south wall was opened in 1948 to allow the use of the adjoining building as office space. Nine years later the interior underwent renovations that blocked the skylight and obscured the stained glass. Interior lighting thereafter came from chandeliers, which were themselves replaced after two decades.

At that time, the building was meant to be included in Poughkeepsie's first Multiple Property Submission (MPS) to the National Register of Historic Places, but the bank objected. Later, after it had changed its name to Bank of the Hudson and moved its headquarters elsewhere while retaining the building as a branch, it dropped the objection and the building was added in 1998 as part of a later MPS. The bank itself has since been acquired by TD Banknorth, which used it as a branch office until the early 2010s.

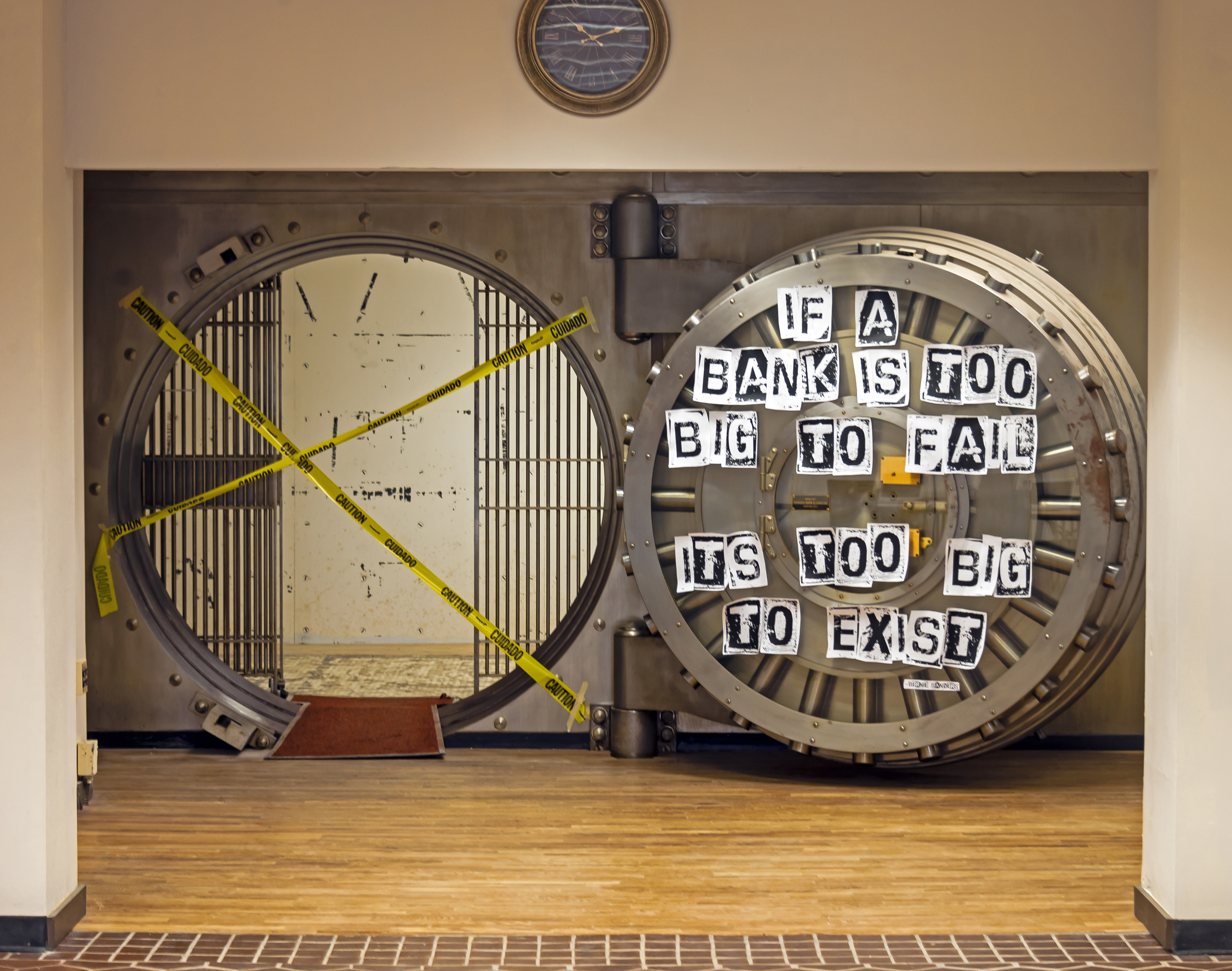
Vault during building's use by the Sanders campaign

In 2016 it was the local headquarters for the Bernie Sanders presidential campaign during the weeks before the New York primary. Volunteers decorated the vault with crime scene tape, and pasted on it a quotation from the candidate: "If a bank is too big to fail, it is too big to exist."

== Measurements ==
Inside, the main banking room is a 40 by 40 foot (12 m by 12 m) with 60-foot (18 m) ceilings, with Ionic pilasters and a continuous entablature rising from a white marble floor (currently carpeted) and red marble wainscot. At the time it opened, it also had a skylight and 19 by 17½-foot (6 by 5 m) stained glass window by Philadelphia's D'Ascenzo Studios commemorating the Half Moon on Henry Hudson's journey up the river named for him and Robert Fulton's pioneering steamboat journey up the river on the Clermont. The overall effect was to cast the building as a temple of commerce.

== See also ==
- National Register of Historic Places listings in Poughkeepsie, New York
