= 181 Montague Street =

Commercial building in Brooklyn, New York

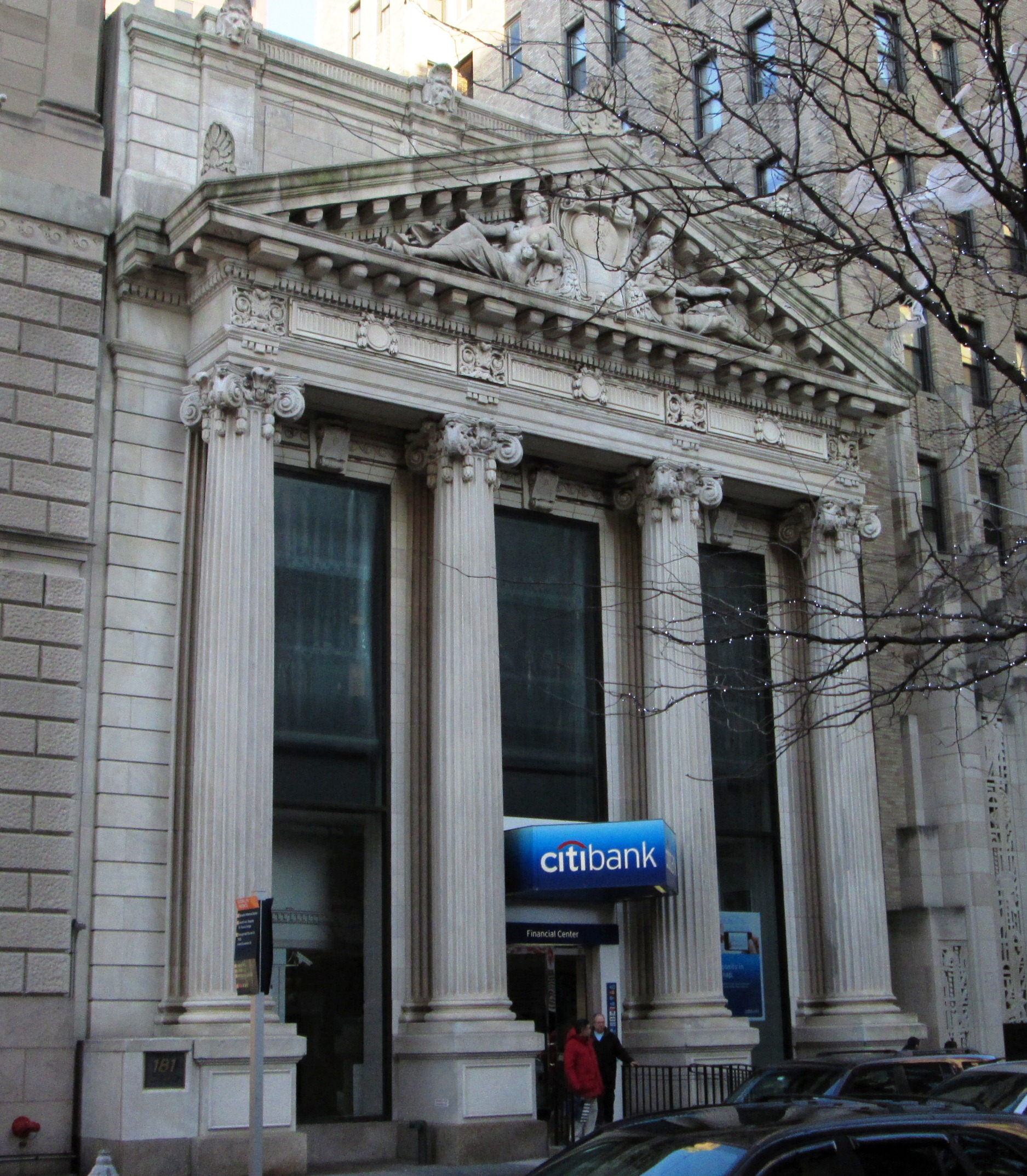
- The Montague Street facade of the People's Trust Company Building
- Interactive map of the 181 Montague Street area
- Former names: People's Trust Company Building

General information
- Architectural style: Neoclassical (original building)
- Location: 181–183 Montague Street, Brooklyn, New York, United States
- Coordinates: 40°41′40″N 73°59′31″W
- Construction started: 1904 (original building); 1929 (annex)
- Completed: March 31, 1906 (original building); April 1930 (annex)

Technical details
- Floor count: 2 (original building); 6 (annex)

Design and construction
- Architects: Mowbray & Uffinger (original building); Walker & Gillette (annex)

New York City Landmark
- Designated: January 24, 2017
- Reference no.: 2586
- Designated entity: Exterior

181 Montague Street, also known as the People's Trust Company Building, is a commercial building in the Brooklyn Heights neighborhood of Brooklyn in New York City, New York. The original two-story building on Montague Street was designed by architectural firm Mowbray & Uffinger, while Walker & Gillette designed a six-story annex at the rear, on Pierrepont Street. The structure was built as part of "Bank Row", a series of bank buildings on Montague Street within Brooklyn Heights.

The original building's facade is made of white marble quarried from Dover, New York, as well as polished pink granite quarried from Milford, Massachusetts. The primary element of the Montague Street facade is a tetrastyle portico with four fluted columns supporting a triangular pediment with carved cartouches. Walker and Gillette designed the Pierrepont Street annex with a granite entryway surrounded by bands. Originally, the offices were spread across two levels.

The People's Trust Company had been founded in 1889 and initially was located in two other buildings on Montague Street. In May 1901, the president of the People's Trust Company purchased two land lots at 181 and 183 Montague Street. Workers began clearing the site in 1904, and the new People's Trust Company Building was completed in March 1906. By the late 1920s, the branch at 181 Montague Street could no longer accommodate all of National City Bank's business, so the annex was built during 1929. The bank branch continued to be operated by Citibank through the early 21st century, and Citibank placed the building for sale in 2012. The developer Jonathan Rose acquired 181 Montague Street in March 2015, and the building became a New York City designated landmark in 2017.

== Site ==
The People's Trust Company Building is located at 181–183 Montague Street in the Brooklyn Heights neighborhood of Brooklyn in New York City. It occupies a narrow land lot near the western end of the block bounded by Court Street to the east, Montague Street to the south, Clinton Street to the west, and Pierrepont Street to the north. The site covers an area of 9,349 square feet (868.6 m^{2}) and combines two roughly rectangular lots. It has frontage of 50 feet (15 m) on Montague and Pierrepont Streets and a depth of 200 feet (61 m), although the portion of the site on Pierrepont Street is aligned slightly further east from the portion on Montague Street. The building adjoins the Brooklyn Trust Company Building to the west and 185 Montague Street to the east, although the bank buildings have different architectural styles. Other nearby buildings include the Montague–Court Building at the eastern end of the block; the Center for Brooklyn History building and the St. Ann & the Holy Trinity Church, just across Clinton Street to the west; and the Crescent Athletic Club House of Saint Ann's School, to the northwest across Clinton and Pierrepont Streets. An entrance to the New York City Subway's Borough Hall/Court Street station is across Clinton Street to the west.

The site was historically owned by Hezekiah Pierrepont, one of Brooklyn Heights' developers; Pierrepont Street was named for him, while Montague Street was named for his relative Lady Mary Wortley Montagu. During the 1860s and early 1870s, the Brooklyn Academy of Music, Brooklyn Mercantile Library, and Brooklyn Art Association all had developed buildings on the adjoining block of Montague Street, which ran between Clinton and Court Streets. An increasing number of businesses were moving to the area by the 1890s, and the adjacent block of Montague Street was nicknamed "Bank Row" after several bank buildings were built there in the 1900s. Among the banks in the area were the Brooklyn Trust Company, which moved to the corner of Montague and Clinton Street in 1873, as well as the People's Trust Company and the National Title Guaranty Company.

== Architecture ==
The original building on Montague Street was designed by architectural firm Mowbray & Uffinger, composed of Louis Montayne Mowbray and Justin Maximo Uffinger, in a neoclassical style and completed in 1906. The United States Department of Housing and Urban Development wrote in 1985 that the building "reflects the popularity of Roman Classical forms for late 19th and 20th century banks." Walker & Gillette designed the rear addition on Pierrepont Street, which was completed in 1929. The design of the rear annex has been incorrectly attributed to Shreve, Lamb & Harmon, who designed the Empire State Building.

=== Facade ===
==== Original building ====
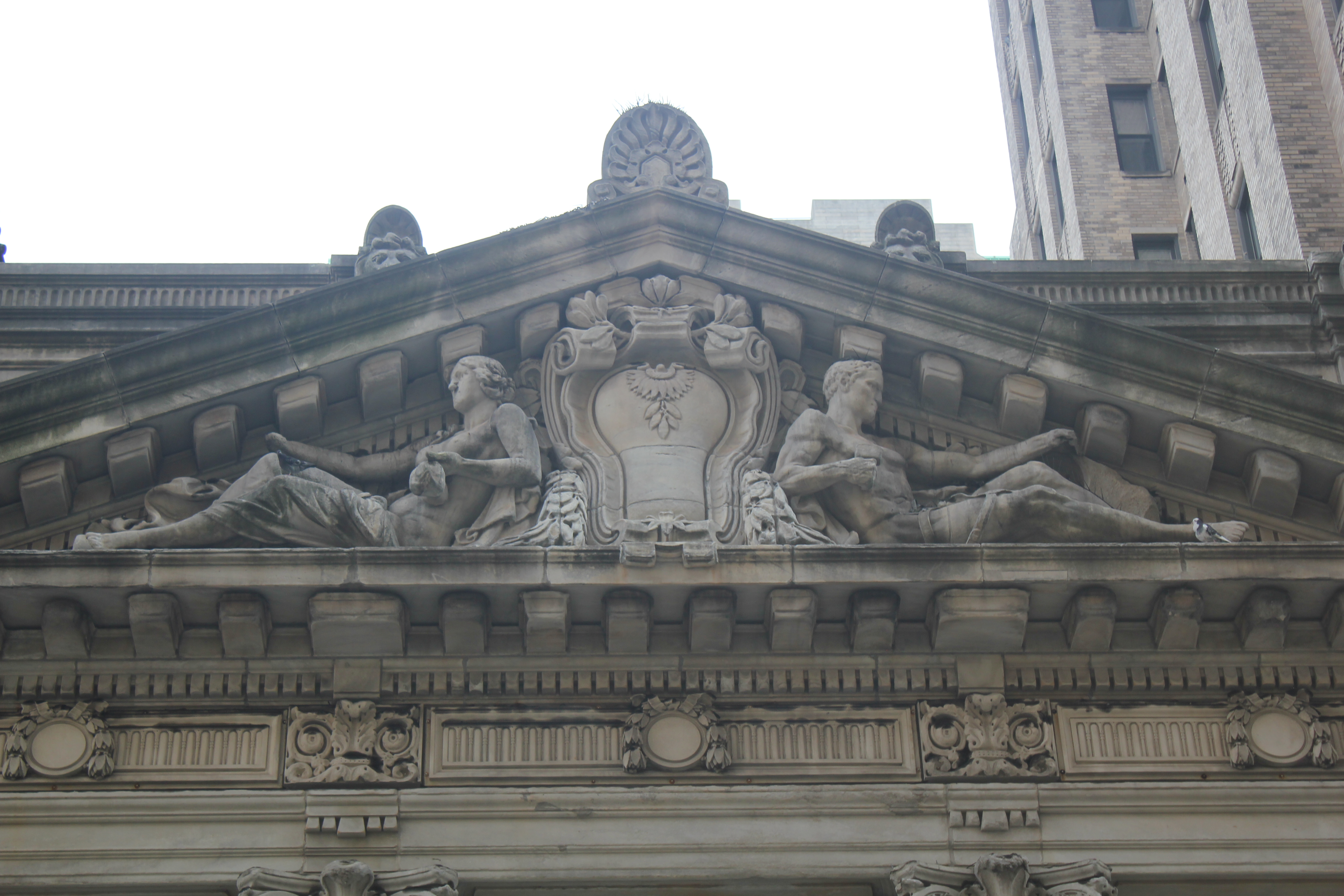
Detail of the pediment

The original building's facade, by Mowbray & Uffinger, is made of white marble quarried from Dover, New York, as well as polished pink granite quarried from Milford, Massachusetts. Granite is used on the water table, while marble is used on the rest of the facade. The primary element of the Montague Street facade is a tetrastyle portico with four fluted columns supporting a triangular pediment. Each column measures 27 ft (8.2 m) tall and measures 3.83 by 3.83 feet (1.17 by 1.17 m) across. The columns have variously been cited as weighing 20 short tons (18 long tons; 18 t), 24 short tons (21 long tons; 22 t), 28 short tons (25 long tons; 25 t), or 40 short tons (36 long tons; 36 t). At the time of the bank building's construction, they were among the largest columns used in a building in the New York City area. Each of the columns is placed on a large pedestal and is topped by Scamozzi-style capitals of the Corinthian order.

Just behind each column are fluted pilasters topped by astragal and echinus moldings. The pilasters divide the exterior wall vertically into three bays, each of which has a double-height window topped by a lintel with a keystone and molded scrolls. Between the columns and pilasters was originally a recessed areaway with a railing, but the areaway was removed at some point. A ramp was installed in front of the main entrance, which is in the center bay. The outermost sections of the facade contain piers made of rusticated stone. A cornerstone with the name People's Trust Company and the year 1904 is placed behind one of the columns.

The columns on Montague Street support an architrave, which contains gutta, regula, and taenia decorations above each of the columns' capitals. Above the architrave is a frieze with acanthus motifs corresponding to the tops of each column. The frieze originally had the inscription "The People's Trust Company" in capital letters, flanked by acanthus motifs. When this inscription was covered in the 1970s, panels with cartouche-and-bellflower motifs were placed in each bay, while acanthus motifs were placed between the bays. Just below the pediment is a cornice with modillions, as well as rosettes on the cornice's soffit. The pediment itself contains a cartouche with reclining sculpted figures on either side; one depicts a man with a mallet, while the other depicts a woman with a purse. The corners and the top of the pediment have acroteria. There is a flat roof recessed from the pediment. The wall just below the roof is divided by rusticated pilasters that have palmettes and lions' heads at their capitals; the bays between each set of pilasters contain rusticated panels. Along the roofline is an architrave with fascia and a cornice with fluting.

==== Pierrepont Street annex ====
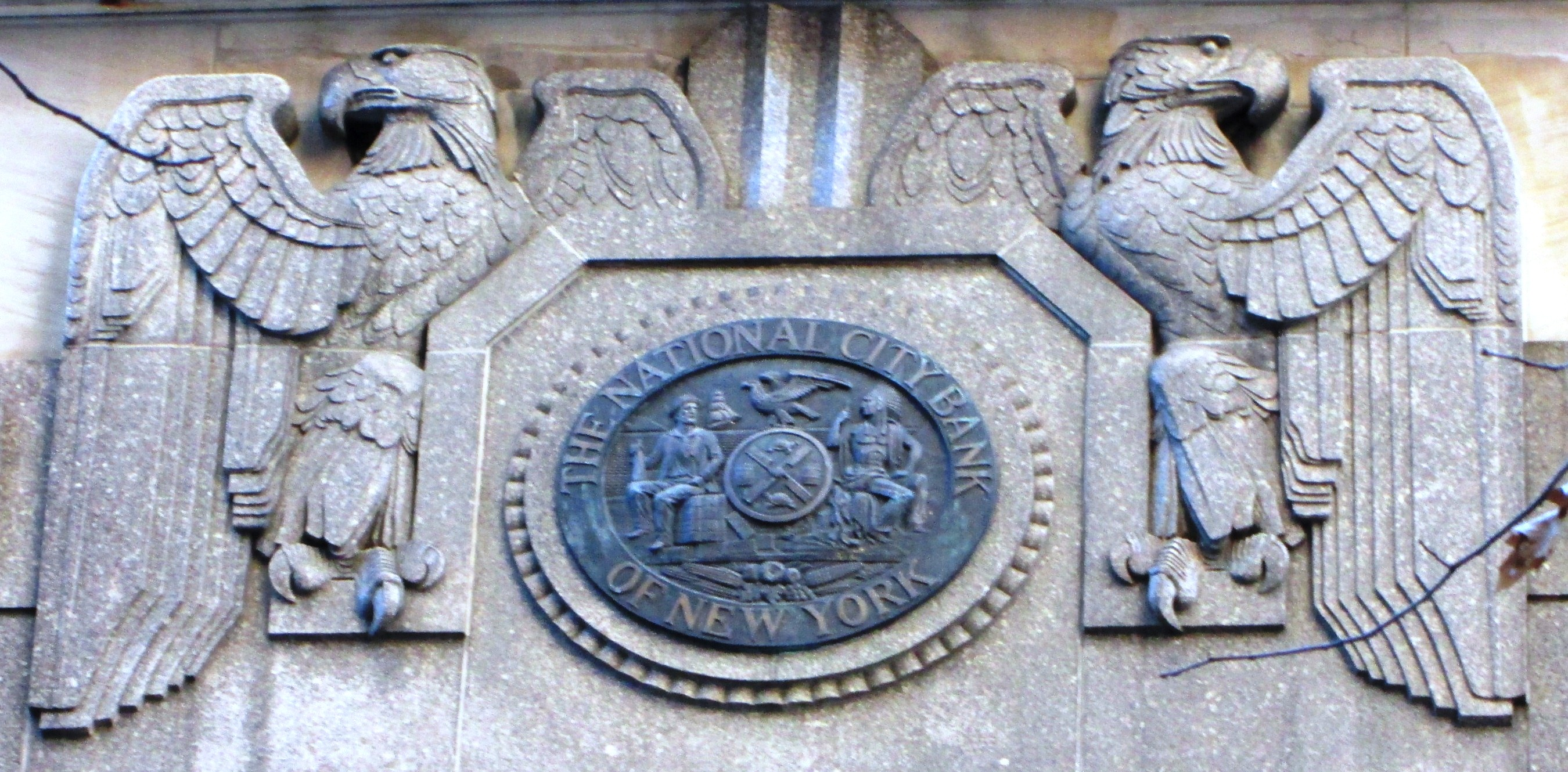
Crest on the Pierrepont Street annex

Walker and Gillette designed the Pierrepont Street annex in a similar style to other banks constructed for the National City Bank during the late 1920s. Walker & Gillette had designed 15 National City Bank branches in New York City, Paris, Puerto Rico, and Latin America. The facade contains a granite entryway surrounded by quilted bands. The top of the entryway is decorated with eagles. This motif was used in at least five other banks in New York City that Walker and Gillette designed for National City Bank.

=== Interior ===
The interior of the building was decorated with Numidian marble and San Domingo mahogany. The floors were covered in gray marble, and the bank also had American bronzework decorations. The building itself has a steel structural frame with hardened brick walls.

Offices were spread across two levels. On the main level, tellers' cages lined a central corridor that stretched the depth of the building. There was also a bank officers' room near the front of the main floor. The secretary's office was to the left of the main entrance, while the president's office was to the right of the main entrance. The president's office had green and mahogany decorations and was also used by the bank's board of trustees. Behind the secretary's office was a banking office with a vault for depositors, as well as a separate book and cash vault for the company's own operations. The vaults were structurally separate from the rest of the building and were accessed by a circular door measuring 7 feet (2.1 m) in diameter and weighing 14 short tons (13 long tons; 13 t). The two vaults combined had 1,400 boxes, of which the depositors' vault had about 1,000 safe-deposit boxes. Behind the president's office was the bank's trust department, which had a waiting room.

The mezzanine level only covered about one-third or one-quarter of the original building's total footprint. The front portion of the mezzanine level had a bookkeepers' department. The bookkeepers' department had several long desks and had a telautograph system that allowed them to communicate with the clerks. Above the rest of the main level was a high coved ceiling. The basement contained another vault, which was used to store large materials. In addition, the basement had a banking room where municipal employees could cash their checks. At the time of the building's opening, the People's Trust Company had many depositors who were employed by the government of New York City; these employees cashed their checks on the first of every month, causing the bank to become crowded. There was also a boiler room at the front of the basement, which had two boilers, in addition to storage space for 50 tons of coal.

== History ==
The People's Trust Company had been founded in 1889. From the outset, the bank had its headquarters on Montague Street. It first rented an office at 201 Montague Street until April 1890, upon which it moved to 172 Montague Street for the next 16 years. Over the next two decades, the bank invested heavily in numerous rapid-transit companies in Brooklyn. The bank gradually acquired several smaller banks through merger.

=== Development and early years ===
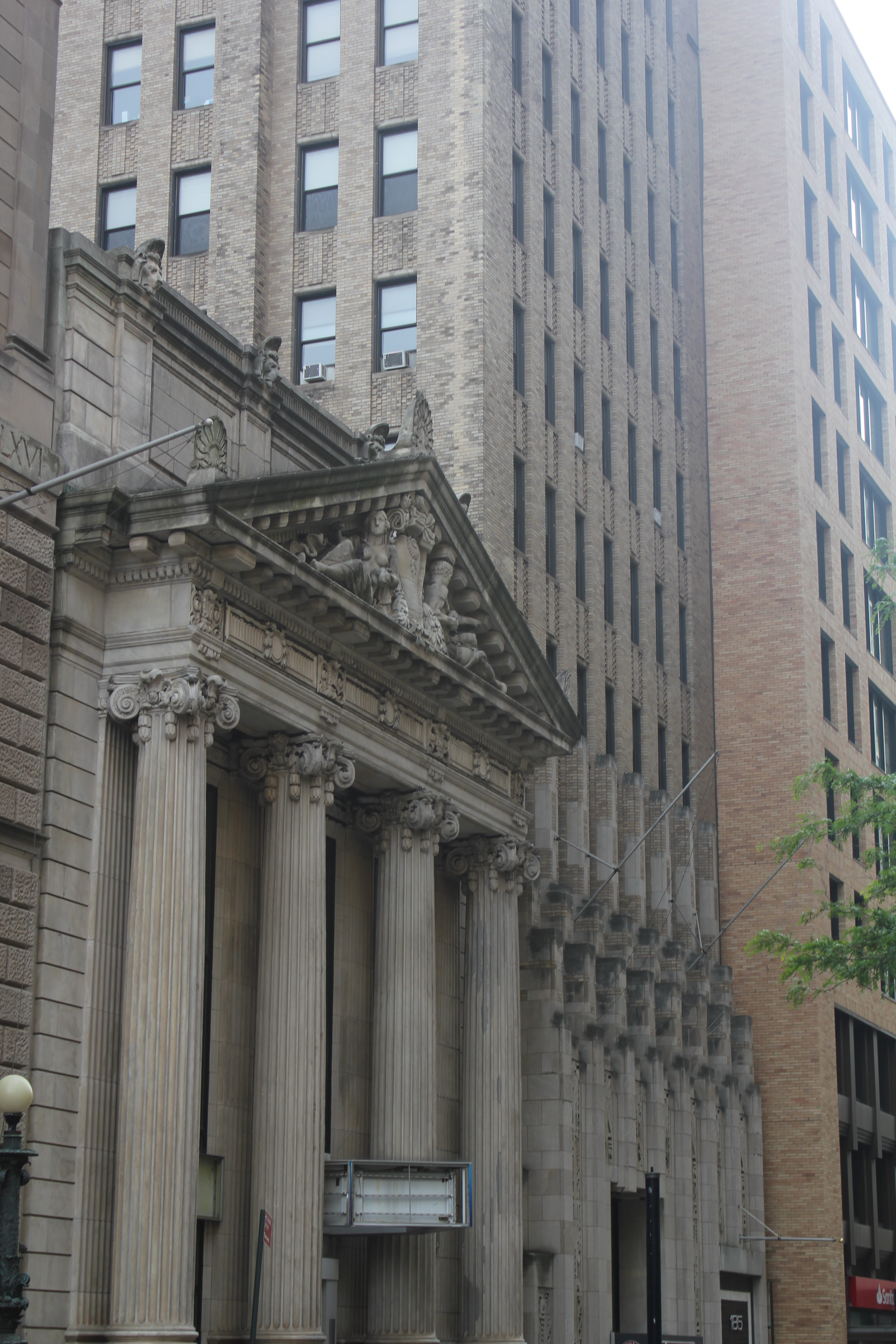
The main facade as seen from further west along Montague Street

In May 1901, People's Trust Company president Felix Campbell purchased two land lots at 181 and 183 Montague Street. The New-York Tribune reported rumors that the bank was to build a new headquarters on the site, although the newspaper dismissed the rumors as "not likely" because of the abundance of bank buildings already in Brooklyn. Brooklyn Life reported in May 1904 that the bank would be erecting a new headquarters across from its office at 172 Montague Street, which would be "an office building devoted exclusively to [People's Trust's] own banking business".

Mowbray and Uffinger were hired as the building's architects, creating a design for a one-story structure with a portico. They submitted plans for a building at 181–183 Montague Street in mid-May 1904. Scrap-materials dealer Thomas Krekeler Co. was hired by the next month to demolish the existing buildings at 181–183 Montague Street for the People's Trust Company. The columns in the building's portico were so heavy that workers erected a special derrick just to install the columns, even though the bank building was only two stories high. The bank employed a team of fourteen horses to pull each of the building's columns to the construction site. By September 1905, the building was scheduled to be opened at the end of that year. The People's Trust Company Building was completed in March 1906. Workers started moving into the building on March 25, and it officially opened on March 31.

In the years after the People's Trust Company moved to 181 Montague Street, the bank's holdings and presence grew significantly. The bank was Brooklyn's largest trust company by 1909, with three branch locations, as well as deposits of $18 million, capital of $1 million, and surpluses of $1.6 million. The People's Trust Company continued to expand, with eight branches in 1922, although the Montague Street building remained the bank's headquarters. The bank acquired the adjacent site at 185 Montague Street in September 1922 and retained it for seven years. The People's Trust Company was acquired in March 1926 by the National City Bank of New York. At the time of the merger, the People's Trust Company had 11 branches and $76 million in assets, while National City Bank had seven branches and $1.291 billion in assets. When the merger was finalized in June 1926, the building at 181 Montague Street became a National City Bank branch, serving as the bank's Brooklyn headquarters. The adjacent structure at 185 Montague Street housed the bank's securities division, the National City Company.

=== Mid- to late 20th century ===
By the late 1920s, the branch at 181 Montague Street could no longer accommodate all of National City Bank's business. As such, the bank indicated in early 1929 that it would build an annex along Pierrepont Street, behind its existing building. As part of the project, the original offices were to be remodeled extensively. The bank temporarily relocated to 151 Montague Street in February 1929 to allow work on the annex to proceed. Walker & Gillette filed plans the next month for $150,000 worth of alterations to the building. By that April, the bank was excavating a site for the annex. The annex contained offices for the National City Company and was originally supposed to be completed in December 1929. A certificate of occupancy for the annex was granted in April 1930. The work cost about $600,000 in total and doubled the floor area of the bank.

=== 21st century ===
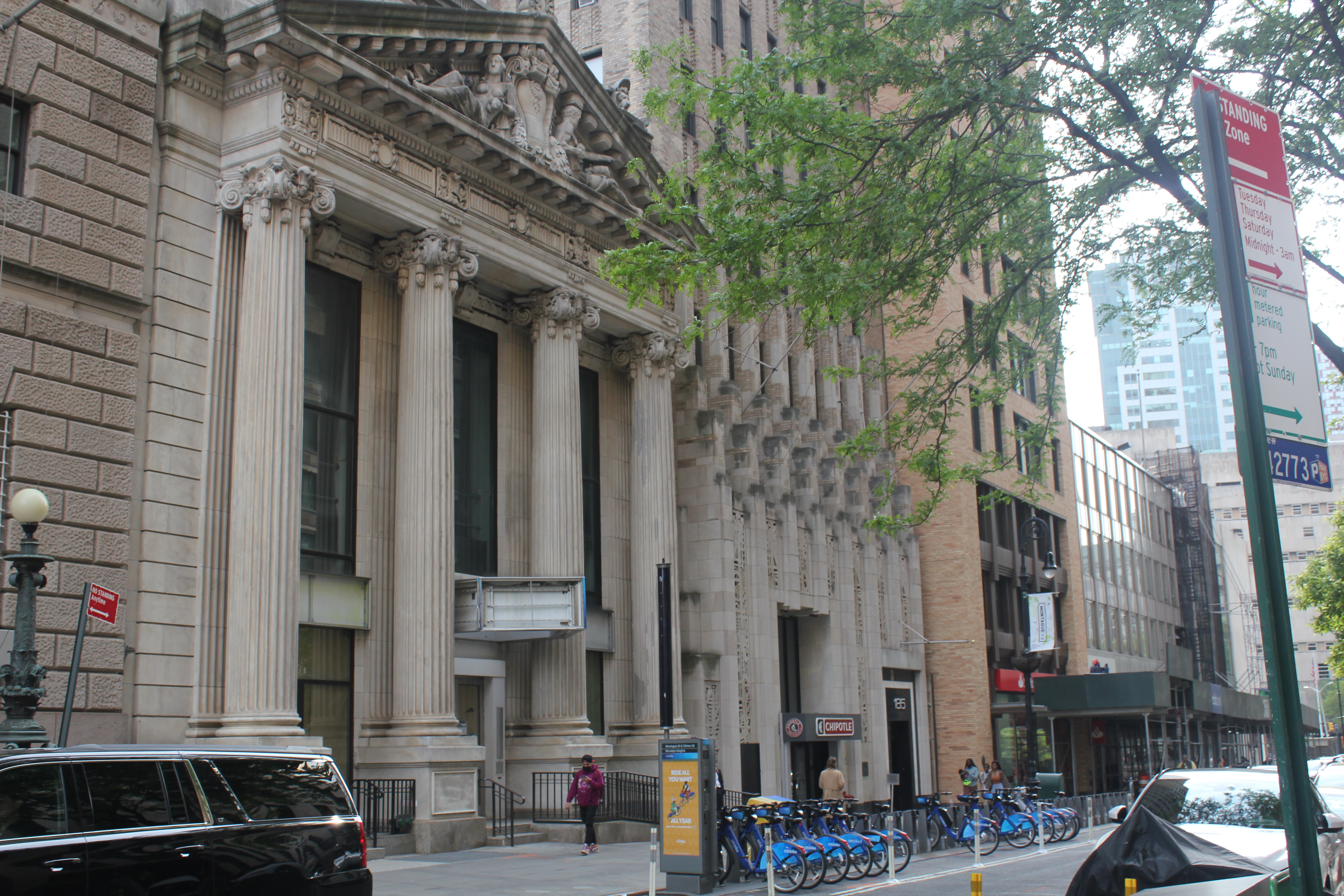
Ground level, seen in May 2023

The bank branch continued to be operated by National City Bank and its successor Citibank through the early 21st century. Citibank installed "talking ATMs" for blind and sight-impaired customers at 181 Montague Street in 2001. The People's Trust Company Building, along with the adjacent National Guaranty Trust Company Building at 185 Montague Street, were nominated for city-landmark protection as part of the Borough Hall Skyscraper Historic District in 2011, but the New York City Landmarks Preservation Commission (LPC) did not include the buildings in the district. Local civic group Brooklyn Heights Association then proposed that both 181 and 185 Montague Street be designated as New York City individual landmarks.

Citibank placed 181 Montague Street and six of its other New York City bank branches for sale in September 2012. Prudential Financial and Madison Capital bought 181 Montague Street in 2012 for $18.3 million. The partners planned to retain the banking space on Montague Street while redeveloping the Pierrepont Street side. The developer Jonathan Rose acquired 181 Montague Street for $36.5 million in March 2015. This prompted concerns that Rose would demolish or significantly modify the building because Rose had just razed an adjacent structure to make way for condominiums, and because a limited-liability company named Montague Pierrepont Apartments LLC was recorded as the buyer. By then, Citibank occupied 9,350 square feet (869 m^{2}) in the building, and the other 21,700 square feet (2,020 m^{2}) was used as offices.

The LPC began considering preserving 181 and 185 Montague Street as individual landmarks in August 2016, and Rose expressed support for the designation of his building. The LPC hosted public hearings for the designations of the buildings at 181 and 185 Montague Street that November. Although the LPC designated both structures as landmarks on January 27, 2017, the designation did not include the six-story annex on Pierrepont Street. In May 2024, TD Bank announced plans to open a branch at 181 Montague Street that August.

== Critical reception ==
When the building was under construction, the Brooklyn Daily Eagle wrote in 1905: "From a purely architectural point of view it will be the most attractive business building on the street." After the People's Trust Company Building opened, the Eagle called the building one of Brooklyn's most elaborate structures, while Bankers' Magazine called the building "a handsome addition to Brooklyn's financial district". The Architects' and Builder's Magazine wrote, "The rich Ionic of the facade herewith illustrated has solidity and strength. Its endurance and its beauty seem to go hand in hand." Francis Morrone later wrote, "If this is not quite so fully realized a vision of the Classical bank, it is nonetheless a fine thing", and that it complemented the Renaissance-style Brooklyn Trust Company Building to its west. The Department of Housing and Urban Development wrote in 1985 that the annex was a "refined Art Deco structure".

== See also ==
- List of New York City Designated Landmarks in Brooklyn
