= First National Bank of Rochester–Old Monroe County Savings Bank Building =

Historic commercial building in New York, United States

- First National Bank of Rochester-Old Monroe County Savings Bank Building
- U.S. National Register of Historic Places
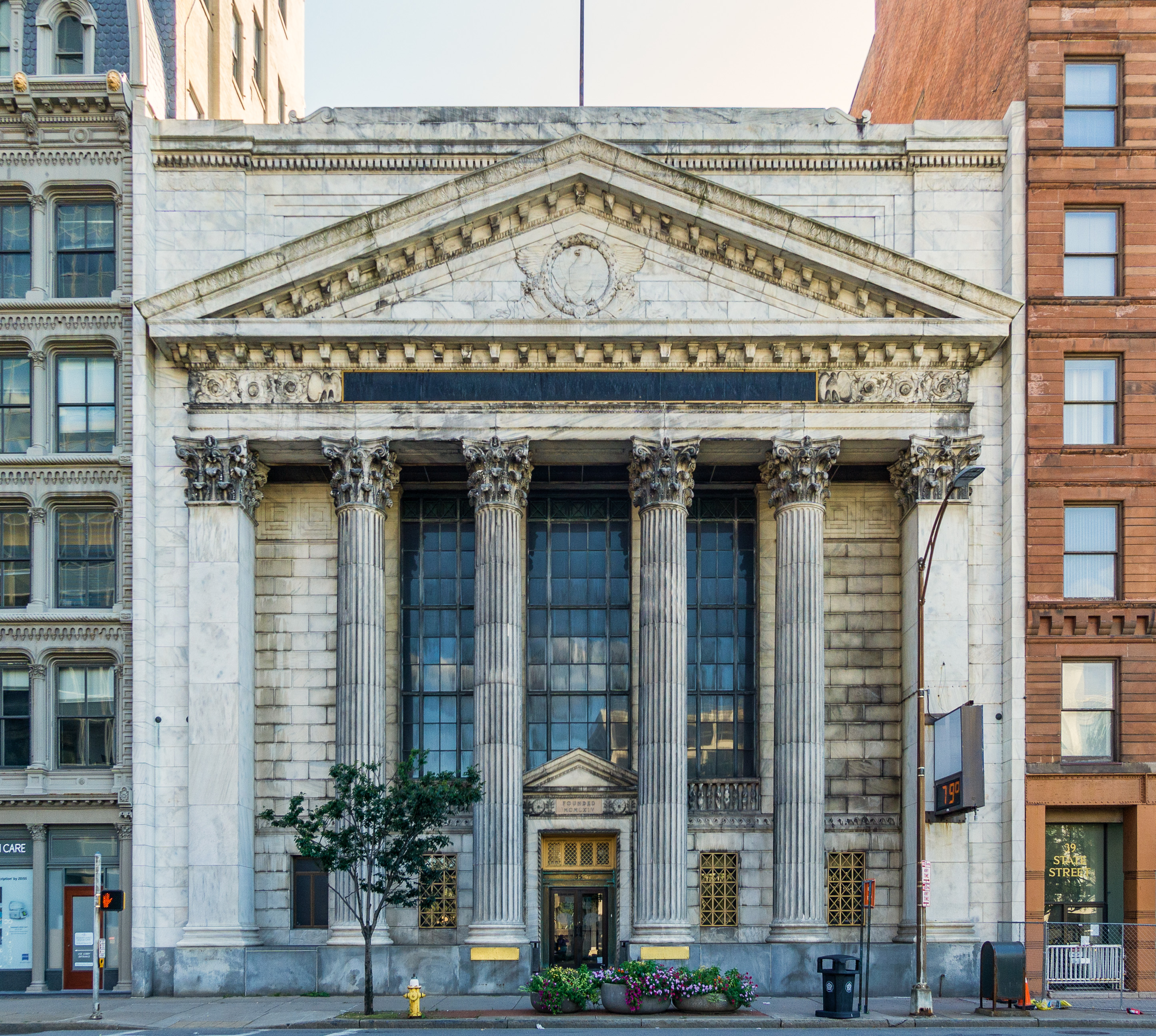

- Location within New York Location within the United States
- Location: 35 State St., Rochester, New York
- Coordinates: 43°9′22″N 77°36′49″W
- Area: less than one acre
- Built: 1924
- Architect: Mowbray and Uffinger; Frederich, A.,& Sons
- Architectural style: Classical Revival
- MPS: Inner Loop MRA
- NRHP reference No.: 85002861
- Added to NRHP: October 04, 1985

First National Bank of Rochester–Old Monroe County Savings Bank Building is a historic bank building located at Rochester in Monroe County, New York. It is currently home to Lifetime Financial Group, LLC. It was built in 1924 for the Monroe County Savings Bank in the Classical Revival style. The State Street facade is built of dressed marble and is composed of a Corinthian order hexastyle portico in antis, supporting an entablature with pediment and an elevated attic story. The interior of the bank consists of a large central banking room with a 52-foot-high cove ceiling with a rectangular skylight and Corinthian order details.

It was listed on the National Register of Historic Places in 1985.
