= Mowbray & Uffinger =

American architectural partnership

Mowbray & Uffinger (later Uffinger, Foster and Bookwalter) comprised an architectural partnership in New York City formed in 1895. Known for bank buildings and as vault engineers the firm designed more than 400 banks in the pre-World War II era throughout the country. The principals were Louis Montayne Mowbray (1867–1921) and Justin Maximo Uffinger Sr. (1871–1948).

Louis Montayne Mowbray was born 1867 in New York. A September 27, 1883, article in The New York Times stated that he had been admitted to the US Naval Academy. Mowbray married Anna Scott. He died in New York in June 1921.

Justin Maximo Uffinger Sr. was born May 7, 1871, in New York City to German immigrants. He was born Justus Maximo Ueffinger but changed his name about the time of his marriage in 1905 to Marion I. Hoag. He began studies at the City College of New York at age 13 and completed his studies in engineering and architecture at Cooper Union in 1891. He articled for renowned architect Richard Morris Hunt while at Cooper Union and until 1895 when he formed a partnership with Mowbray. By 1910 the family was living in Summit, New Jersey. He had two sons, Justin M. Uffinger Jr. and Donald Hoag Uffinger.

For some years the business was conducted by Justin M. Uffinger, C. Manning Foster and Joseph S. Bookwalter. In November 1927 it was reorganized as Uffinger, Foster and Bookwalter.

Justin Uffinger retired in 1930 but continued to work as a consultant as late as 1940. He died in Summit, New Jersey on November 24, 1948.

== Notable commissions ==
All are extant unless otherwise specified. In chronological order:

- Buildings in the Riverside–West 105th Street Historic District (1899–1902), Manhattan, New York
- Butler County National Bank (1903), 302 South Main Street, Butler, Pennsylvania. Now known as Historic Lafayette Apartments, this six-story building was designed in a French Renaissance Revival style, quite different than the firm’s usual neoclassical approach. Listed on the National Register of Historic Places, this is one of two buildings the firm designed for this small community; also see Butler Savings and Trust.
- Altoona Trust Company (1903), 1128-1130 12th Avenue, Altoona, Pennsylvania. Also known as Mid-State Bank and M & T Bank.
- People’s Trust Bank (1903), 183 Montague Street, Brooklyn, New York. Later known as Citibank. Rear addition by Shreve, Lamb, and Harmon (1929).
- First National Bank (1903), 125-129 West Crawford Avenue, Connellsville, Pennsylvania. The six-story building, demolished in 1997, had also housed Wright-Metzler Department Store (1903–1925), succeeded by Troutman’s Department Store (1925–1985).
- Mowbray Residence (1904), 874 Carroll Street, Brooklyn, New York. This townhouse was designed for the senior partner, Louis Mowbray, in a neo-Georgian style.
- Greenwich Town Hall (1905), 299 Greenwich Avenue, Greenwich, Connecticut. Listed on the National Register of Historic Places and now serves as the Greenwich Senior Center.
- Somerset Trust Company (1906), 131 Center Avenue (at West Union Street), Somerset, Pennsylvania. This Beaux-Arts building is noteworthy for its copper and glass dome.
- Newark City Hall (1906), with John H. & Wilson C. Ely
- Dime Savings Bank (1908), 9 DeKalb Avenue and 86 Albee Square, Brooklyn, New York. Addition by Halsey, McCormack, and Helmer (1931). This is often considered to be the firm’s greatest work, and has been designated a New York City Landmark.
- First National Bank Building (1908), 213 Palafox Street, Pensacola, Florida. Now known as the Matt Langley Bell III Building, part of the Escambia County Government Center.
- 121 Atlantic Place, formerly the Atlantic National Bank Building (1908–1909), 121 West Forsyth Street, Jacksonville, Florida. It was constructed amid a race to build Jacksonville's first skyscraper; it lost the race but was Florida's tallest building from 1909 to 1912.
- Mills Bee Lane House (1910), 26 East Gaston Street, Savannah, Georgia. A two-story red brick Georgian Revival house.
- Savannah Bank and Trust (1911), 2-6 East Bryan Street, Savannah, Georgia. This is a 14-story neoclassical office building.
- Poughkeepsie Savings Bank (1912), 21-23 Market Street, Poughkeepsie, New York. Listed on the National Register of Historic Places and now known as TD Banknorth.
- John Hand Building (1912), 17 20th Street North, Birmingham, Alabama. Originally known as First National Bank, this 20-story office building has been renovated for use as residential condominiums and offices. It is listed on the National Register of Historic Places.
- Hibernia Bank (1912), 101 East Bay Street, Savannah, Georgia.
- Kunkel Building (1914), 301 Market Street, Harrisburg, Pennsylvania. Listed on the National Register of Historic Places and now known as Susquehanna Art Museum. Nine stories.
- Former First National Bank, current Manufacturers Hanover Building (c. 1915), Olean, New York, located in the Union and State Streets Historic District.
- West Branch National Bank (1917), 102 West 4th Street Williamsport, Pennsylvania. Now M & T Bank.
- Chapin National Bank (1917), 1675-1677 Main Street, Springfield, Massachusetts. Listed on the National Register of Historic Places.
- First National Bank (1922), 101 East First Street, Sanford, Florida. Six stories.
- Schuylkill Trust Company (1923), 101 North Centre Street, Pottsville, Pennsylvania.
- First National Bank of Rochester (1924), 35 State Street, Rochester, New York. Originally known as the Old Monroe County Savings Bank, and now listed on the National Register of Historic Places.
- Hazleton National Bank (1924), 101 West Broad Street, Hazleton, Pennsylvania. Nine stories.
- Butler Savings and Trust (1925), 106 South Main Street, Butler, Pennsylvania. Also known as National City Bank and Integra Bank. This eight-story structure is one of two buildings the firm designed for this small community; also see Butler County National Bank (Historic Lafayette Apartments).
- Barnett National Bank (1926), 112 West Adams Street, Jacksonville, Florida. 18 stories.
- First National Bank and Trust Building (1927), 101 W. Washington Street, Marquette, Michigan.
- Kaufman Building (1927), 103 W. Washington Street, Marquette, Michigan.

== Gallery ==
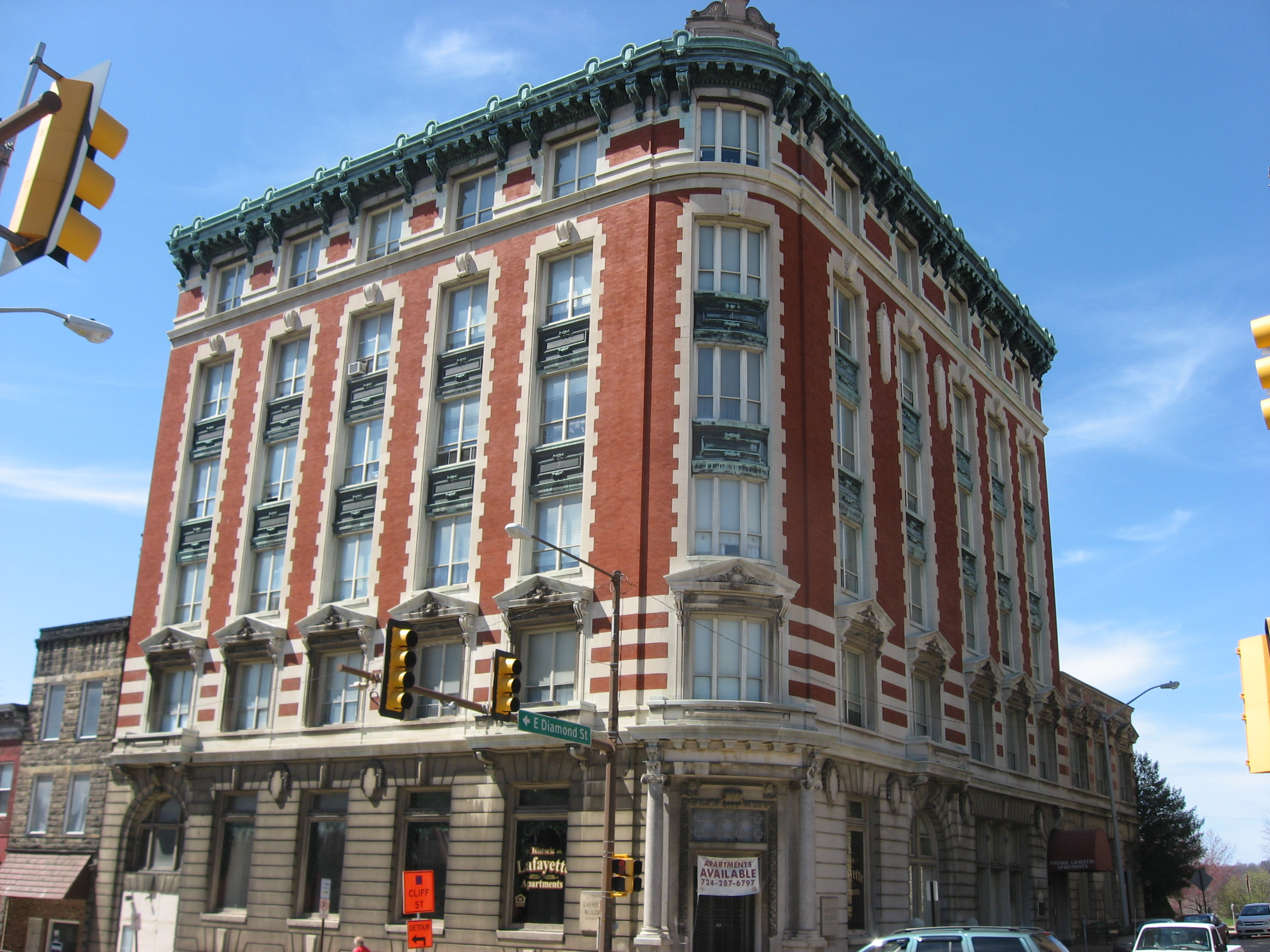
Butler County National Bank (1902)
Butler, Pennsylvania

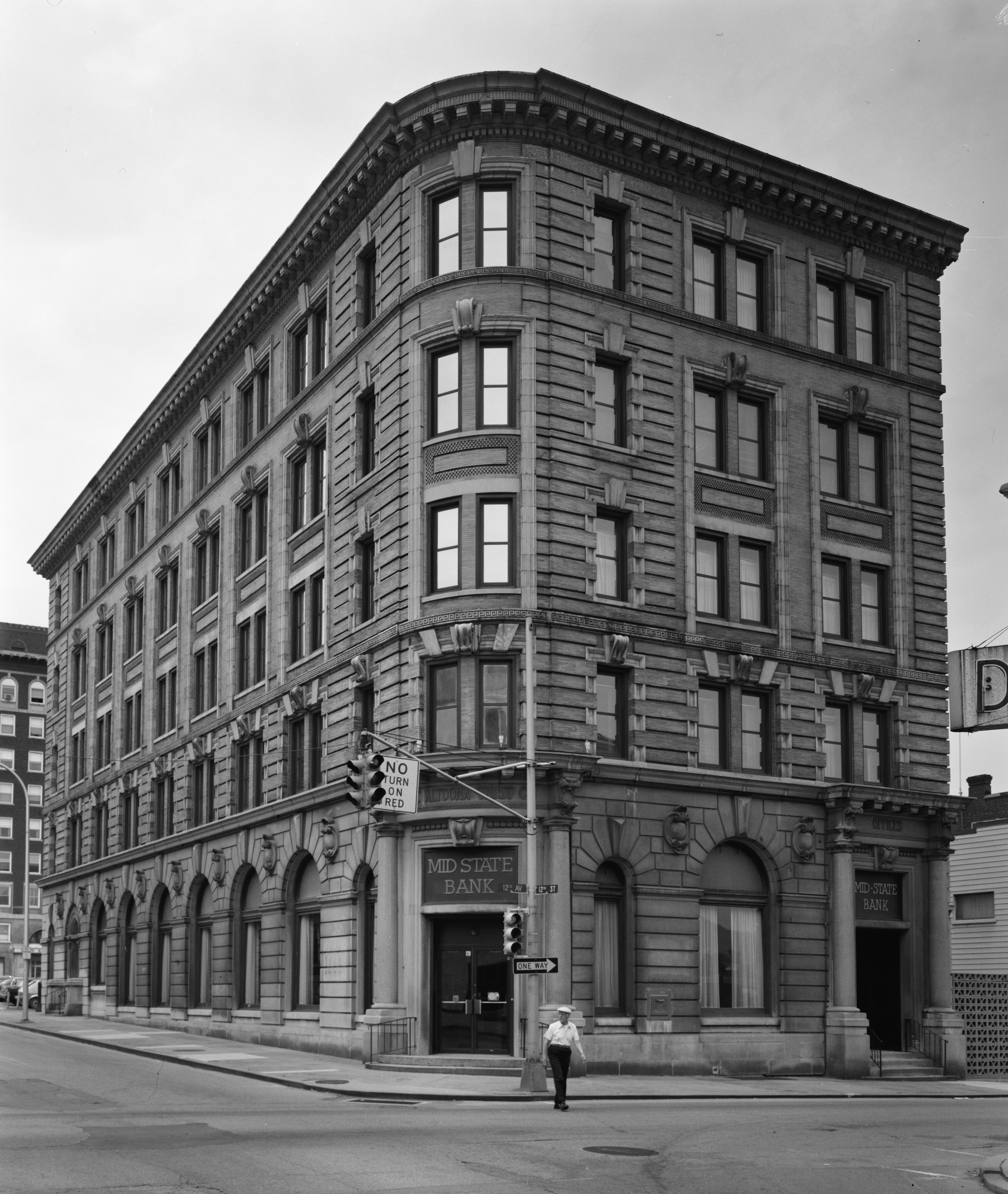
Altoona Trust (1903)
Altoona, Pennsylvania

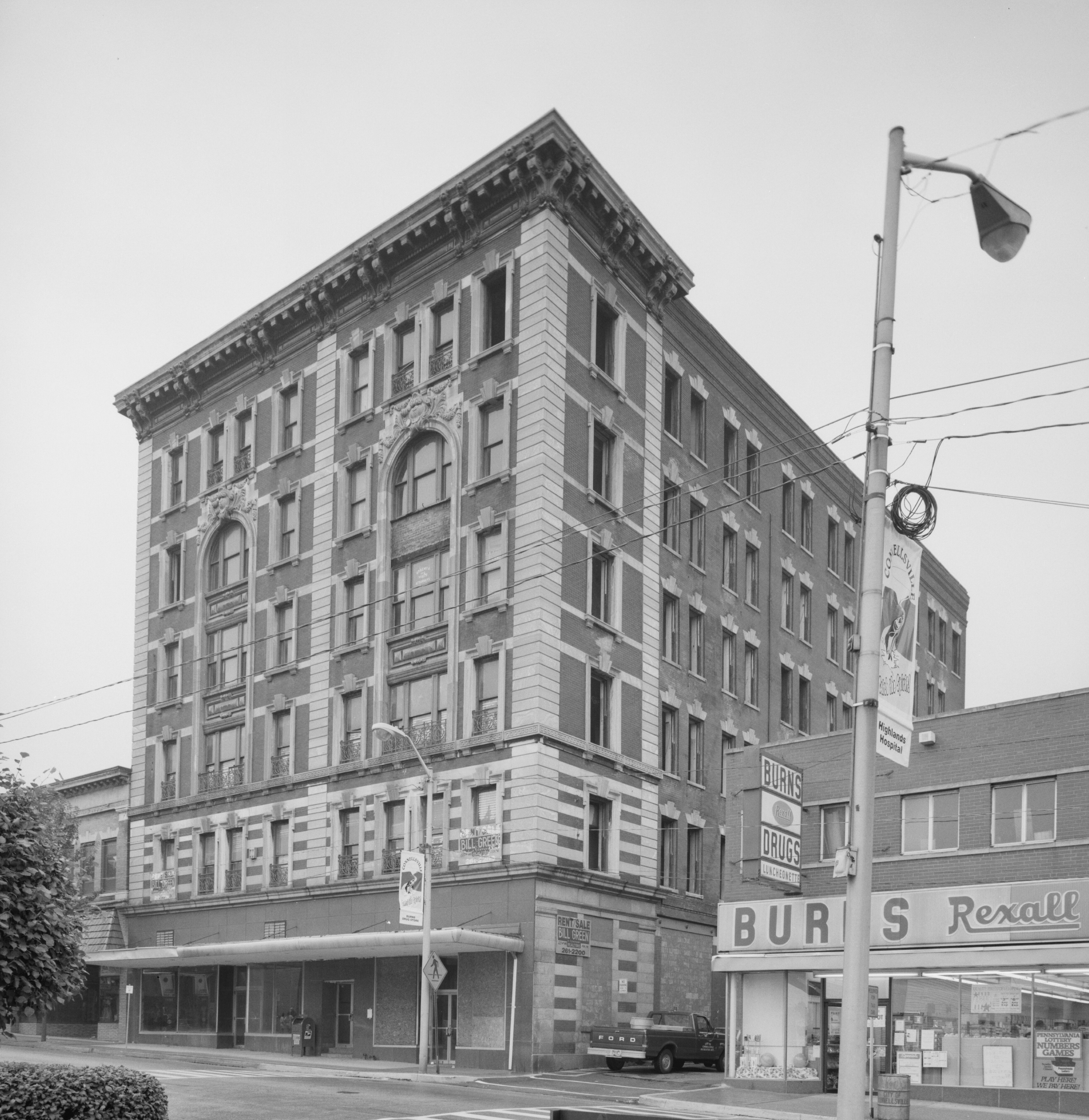
First National Bank (1903)
Connellsville, Pennsylvania

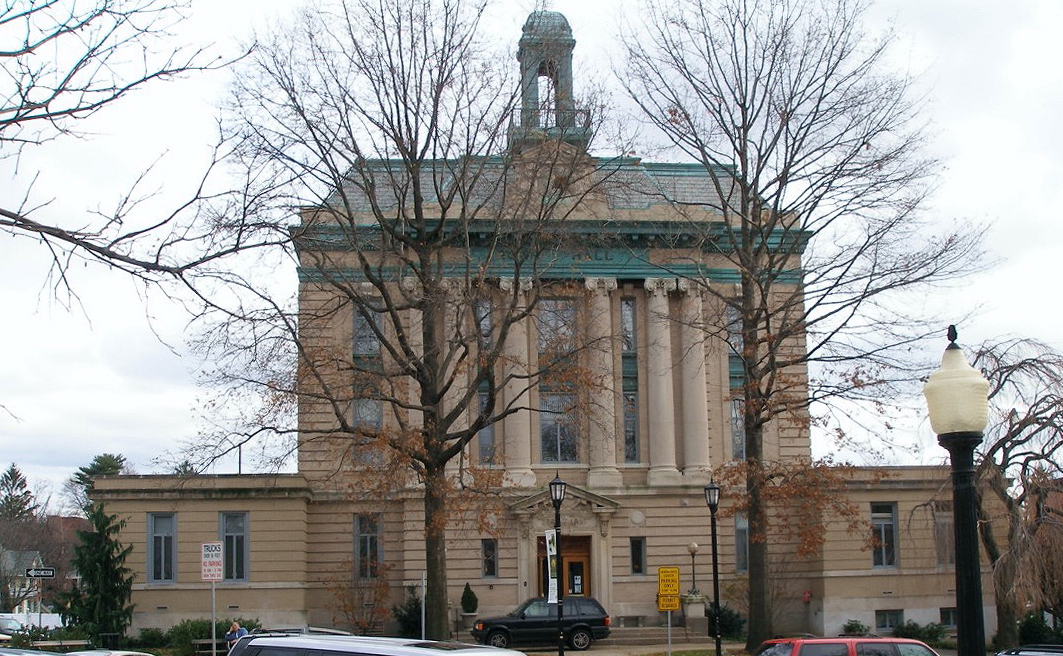
Greenwich Town Hall (1905)
Greenwich, Connecticut

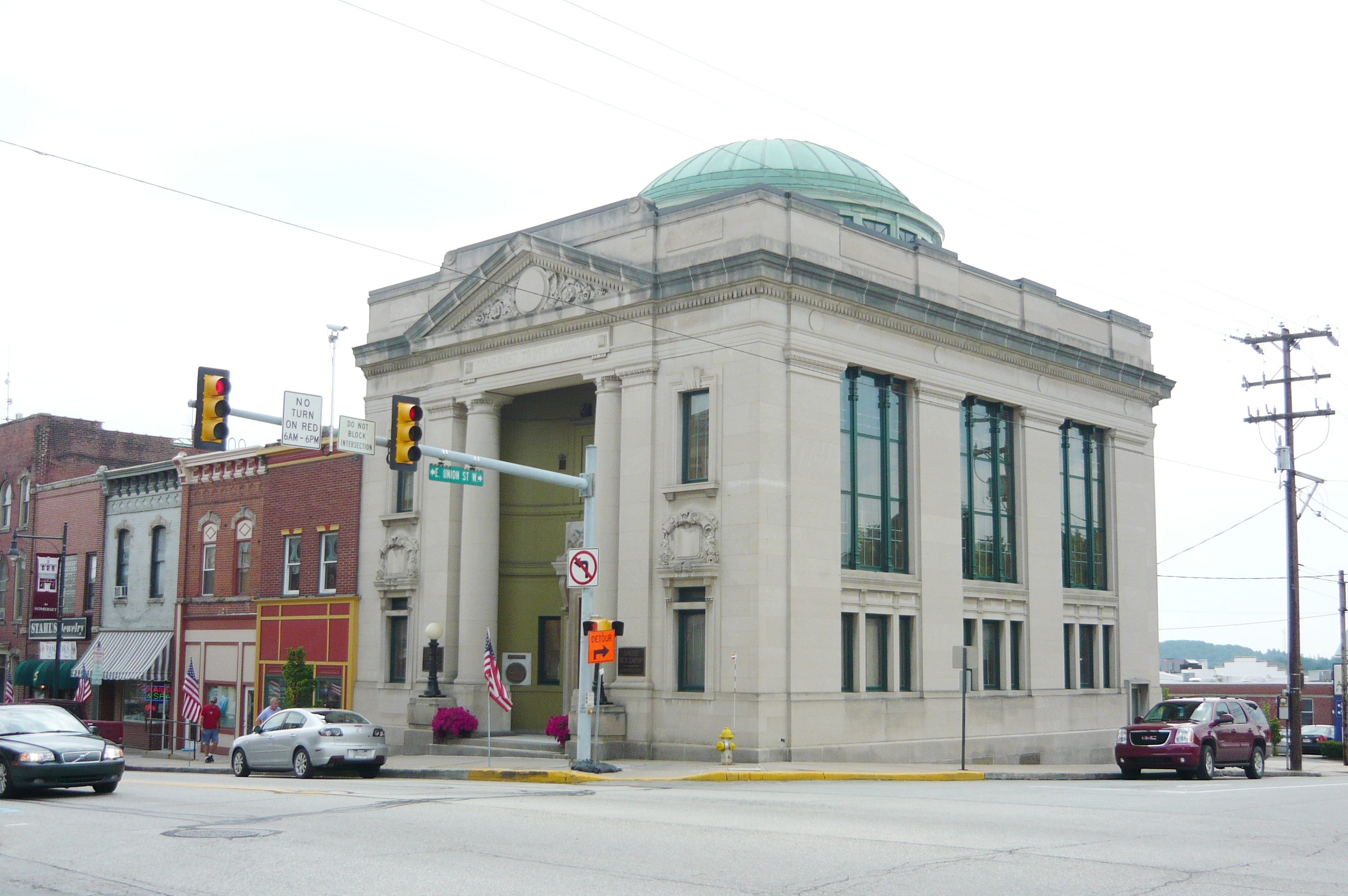
Somerset Trust Company (1906)
Somerset, Pennsylvania

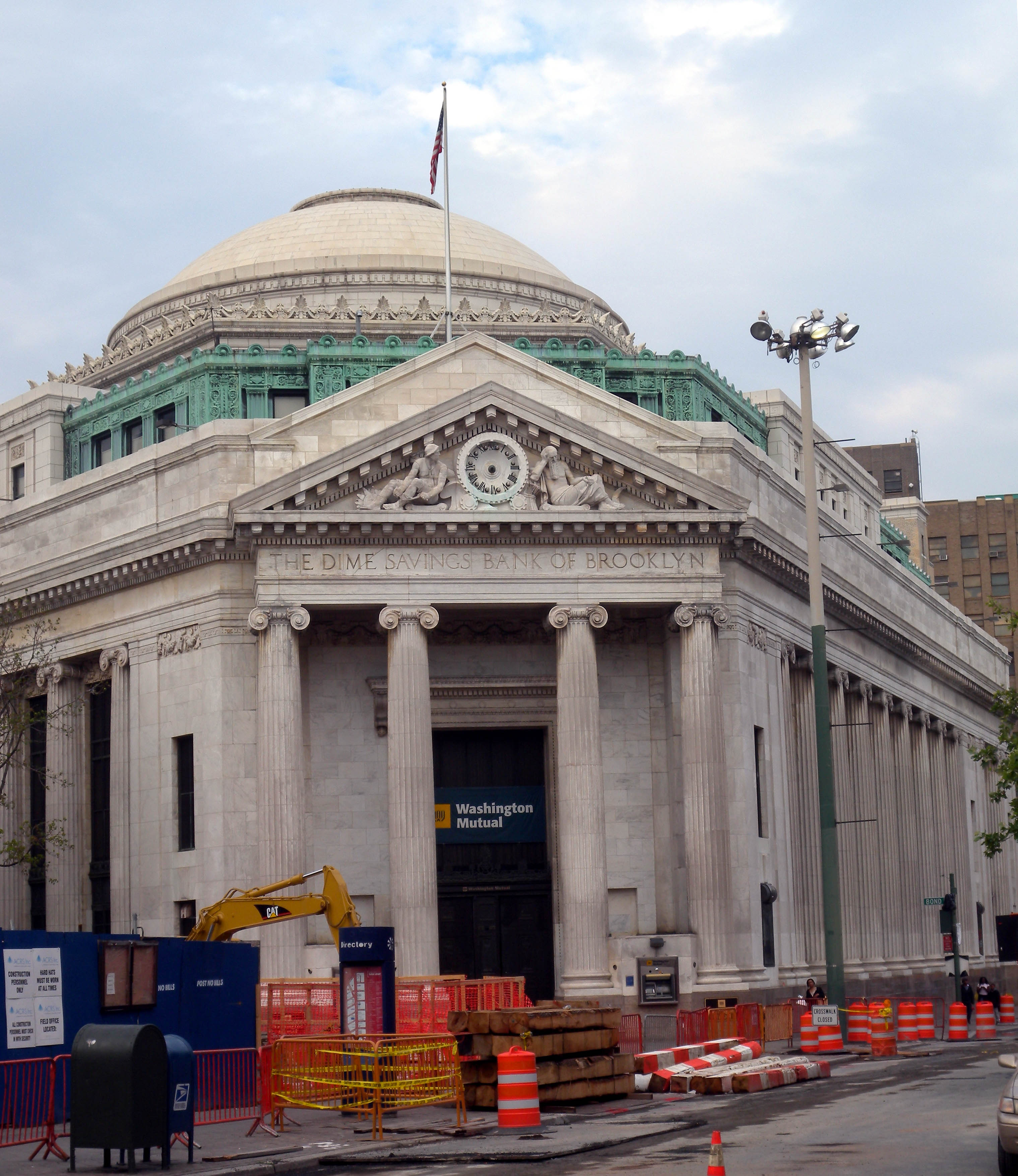
Dime Savings Bank (1908)
Brooklyn, New York

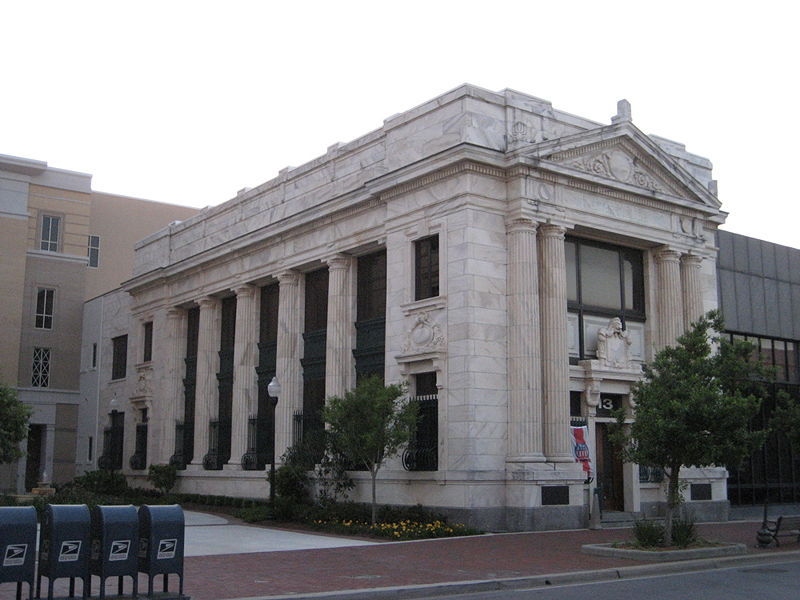
First National Bank (1908)
Pensacola, Florida

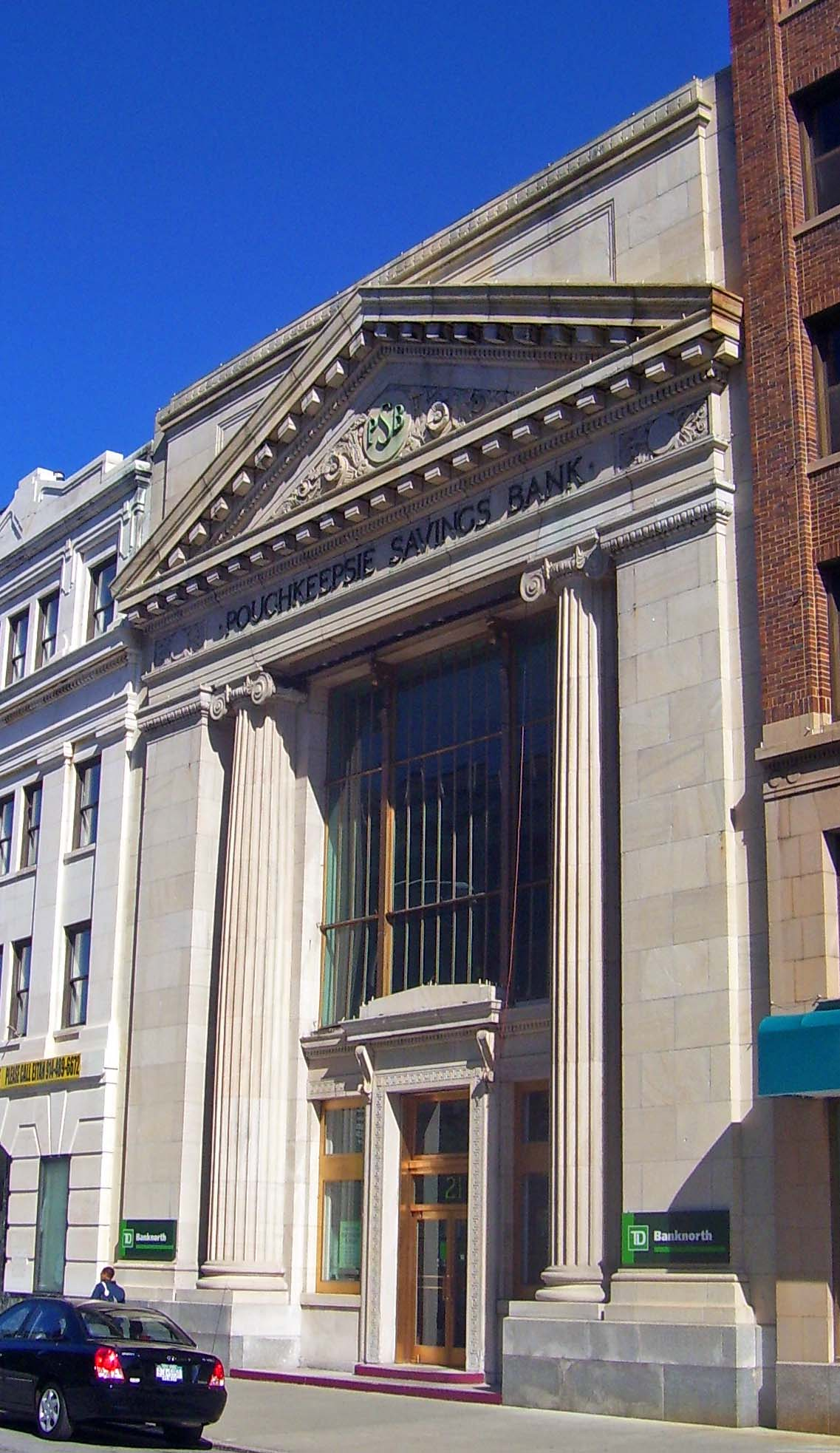
Poughkeepsie Savings Bank (1912)
Poughkeepsie, New York

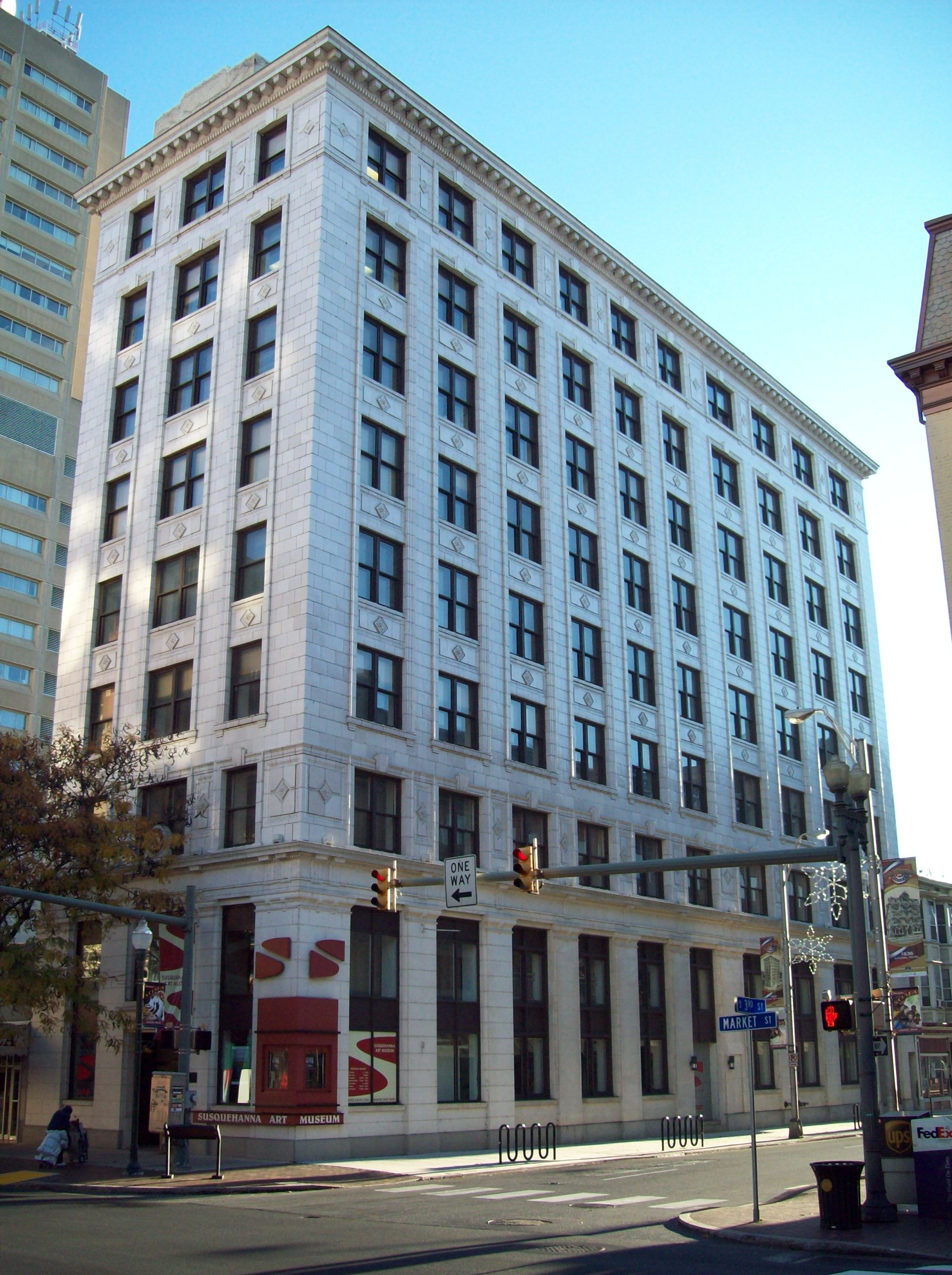
Kunkel Building (1914)
Harrisburg, Pennsylvania

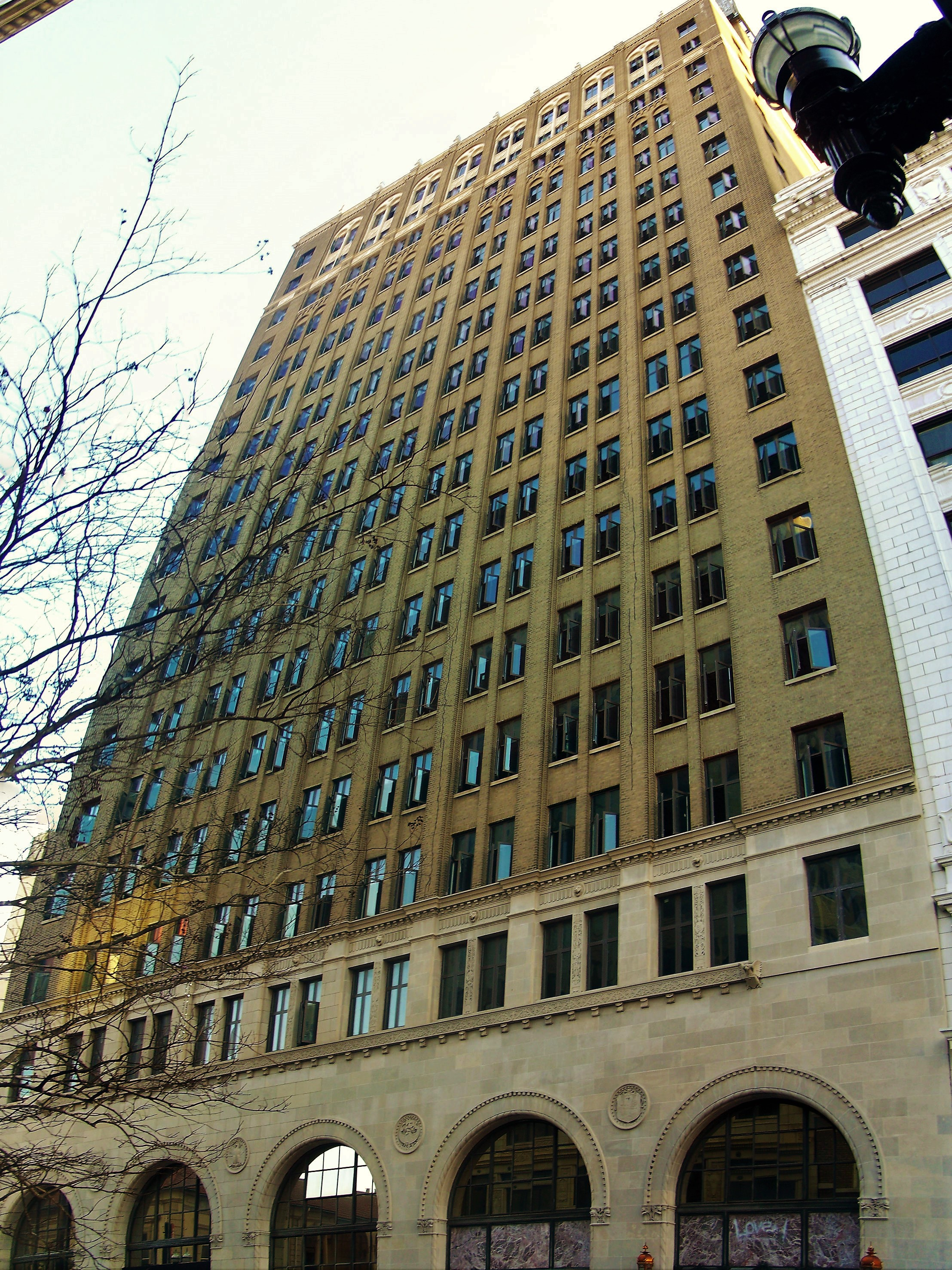
Barnett National Bank Building (1926)
Jacksonville, Florida

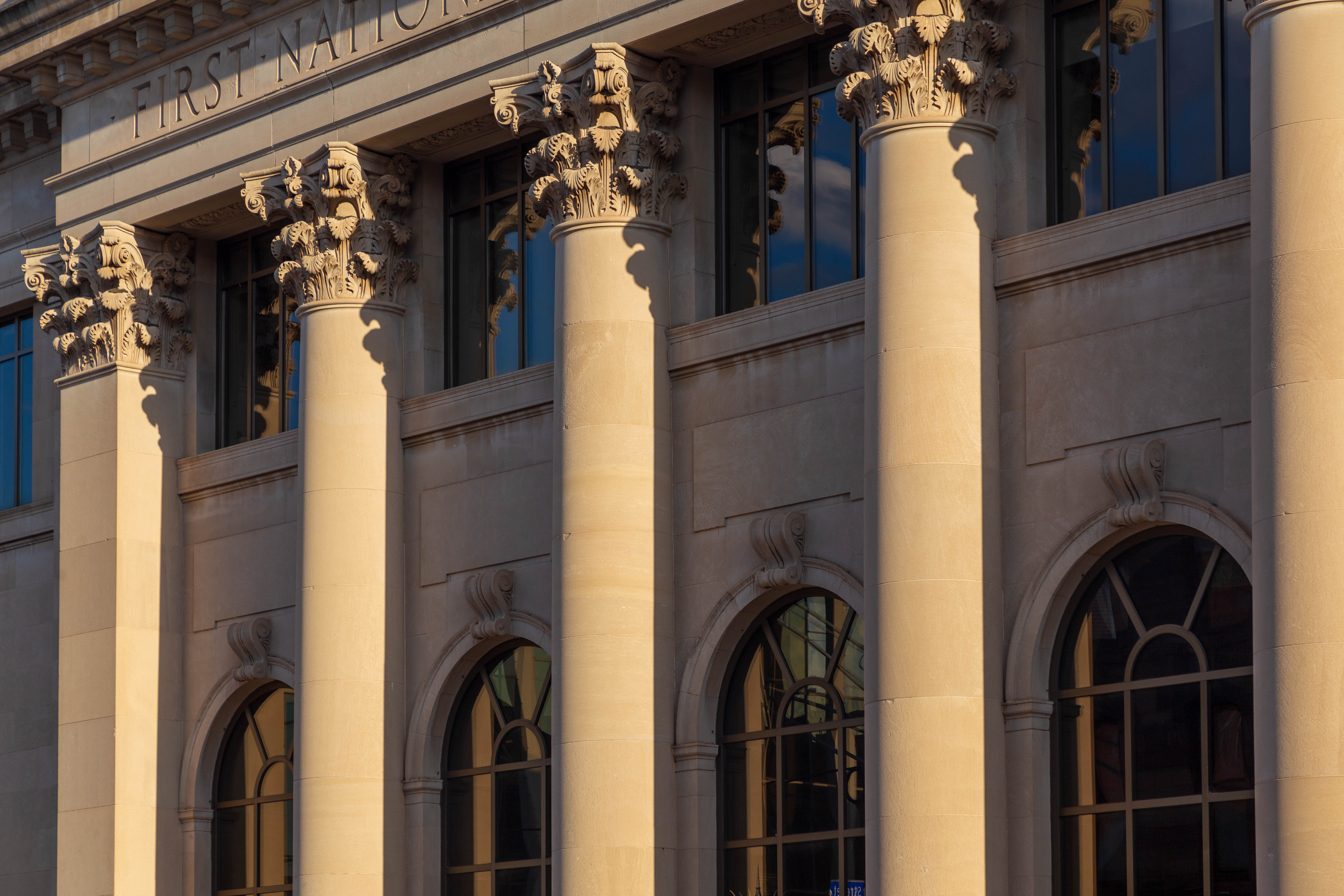
First National Bank and Trust Building (1927)
Marquette, Michigan

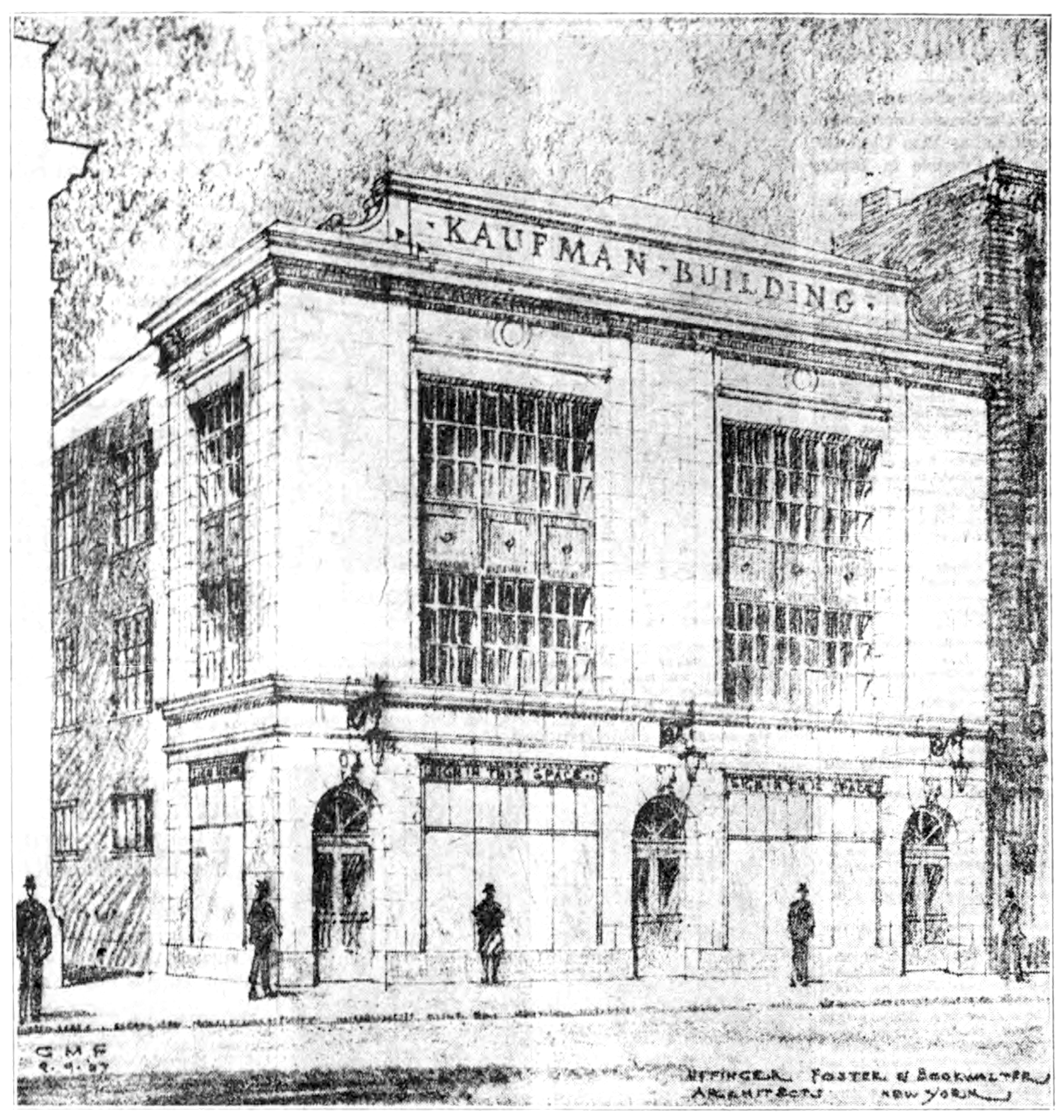
Kaufman Building (1927)
Marquette, Michigan
