= 185 Montague Street =

Commercial building in Brooklyn, New York

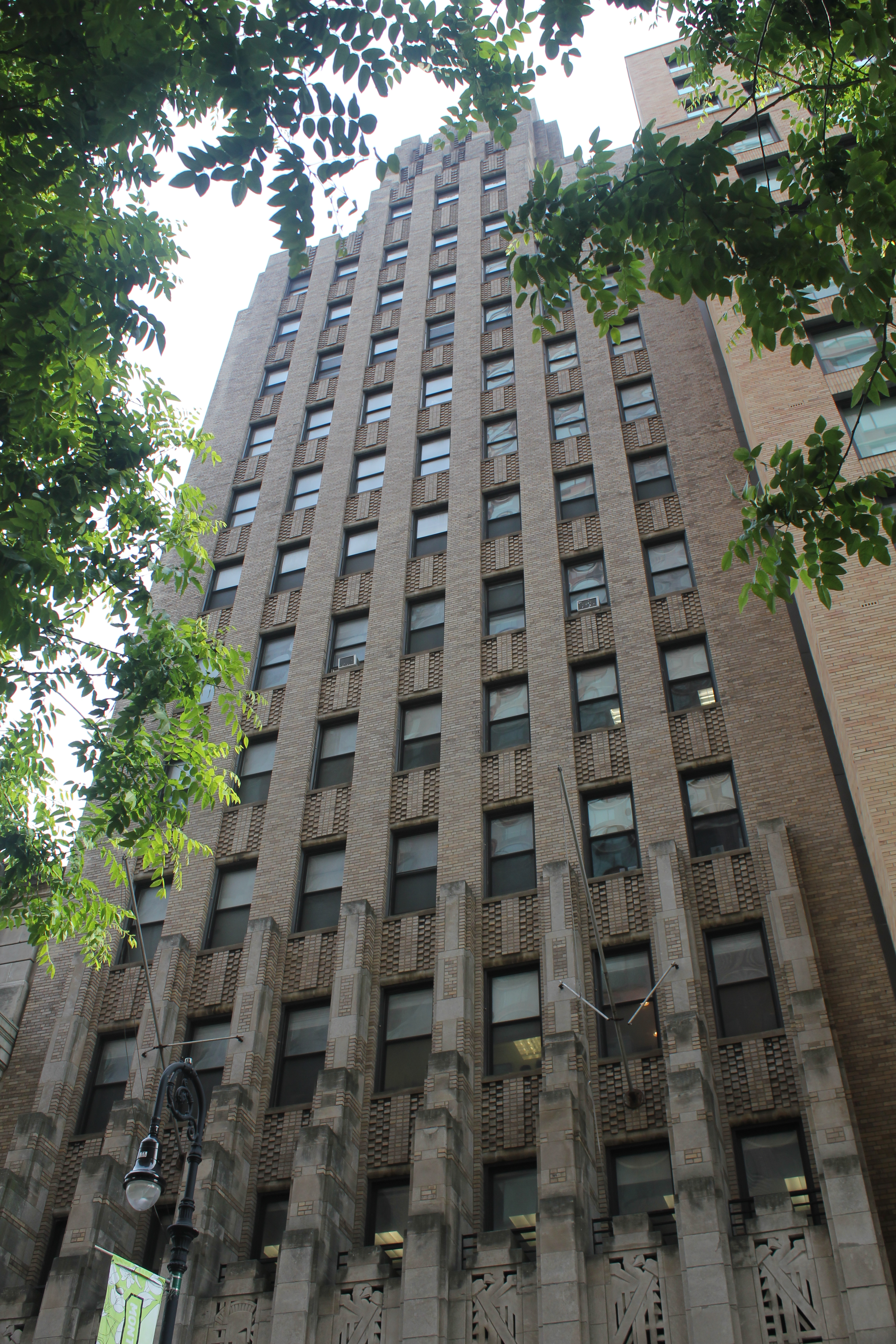
- Front of the building (2023)
- Interactive map of the 185 Montague Street area
- Former names: National Title Guaranty Company Building

General information
- Architectural style: Art Deco
- Location: 185–187 Montague Street, Brooklyn, New York, United States
- Coordinates: 40°41′40″N 73°59′31″W
- Construction started: 1929
- Completed: April 3, 1930

Technical details
- Floor count: 16

Design and construction
- Architects: Harvey Wiley Corbett and Wallace Harrison
- Main contractor: William Kennedy Construction Company

New York City Landmark
- Designated: January 24, 2017
- Reference no.: 2587
- Designated entity: Exterior

185 Montague Street, also known as the National Title Guaranty Company Building, is a commercial building in the Brooklyn Heights neighborhood of Brooklyn in New York City, New York. Constructed for the National Title Guaranty Company between 1929 and 1930, the 16-story building was designed by Harvey Wiley Corbett and Wallace Harrison in the Art Deco style. 185 Montague Street was built by the William Kennedy Construction Company as part of "Bank Row", a series of bank buildings on Montague Street within Brooklyn Heights.

The building's facade is made of brick and limestone. The first two stories are decorated with a limestone screen with panels designed by Rene Paul Chambellan, as well as a pair of asymmetrical openings. The upper stories contain brick piers, which divide the facade vertically, and ornamental brick spandrel panels, which separate the windows on different stories. with setbacks above the 12th story to comply with the 1916 Zoning Resolution. The ground story and basement originally contained a modern-style bank branch with decorations such as terrazzo floors and a colorful ceiling. The National Title Guaranty Company and its subsidiaries occupied the lowest five stories and the basement, while the upper stories were rented out.

The National Title Guaranty Company was established at 172–174 Montague Street in 1924 and expanded significantly over the next three years, with offices across Long Island. To accommodate its growing size, National Title Guaranty bought the sites at 185 and 187 Montague Street in early 1929. National Title Guaranty had moved its offices to the building by November 1929, and 185 Montague Street officially opened on April 3, 1930. Although the building was fully occupied from its opening, the National Title Guaranty Company was liquidated in 1935. The bank branch on the lower stories was subsequently occupied by several other banks, and the building's owners unsuccessfully proposed demolishing the upper stories in the 1940s. The banking space had become a Chipotle Mexican Grill restaurant by the 21st century, and the building became a New York City designated landmark in 2017.

== Site ==
The National Title Guaranty Company Building is located at 185 Montague Street in the Brooklyn Heights neighborhood of Brooklyn in New York City, New York. It occupies a narrow land lot near the western end of the block bounded by Court Street to the east, Montague Street to the south, Clinton Street to the west, and Pierrepont Street to the north. The rectangular site covers an area of 5,000 square feet (460 m^{2}), with a frontage of 50 feet (15 m) and a depth of 200 feet (61 m). The building adjoins the Brooklyn Trust Company Building and the People's Trust Company Building to the west, which have different architectural styles. Other nearby buildings include the Montague–Court Building at the eastern end of the block; the Center for Brooklyn History building and the St. Ann & the Holy Trinity Church, just across Clinton Street to the west; and the Crescent Athletic Club House of Saint Ann's School, to the northwest across Clinton and Pierrepont Streets. An entrance to the New York City Subway's Borough Hall/Court Street station is across Clinton Street to the west.

The site was historically owned by Hezekiah Pierrepont, one of Brooklyn Heights' developers; Pierrepont Street was named for him, while Montague Street was named for his relative Lady Mary Wortley Montagu. During the 1860s and early 1870s, the Brooklyn Academy of Music, Brooklyn Mercantile Library, and Brooklyn Art Association all had developed buildings on the adjoining block of Montague Street, which ran between Clinton and Court Streets. An increasing number of businesses were moving to the area by the 1890s, and the adjacent block of Montague Street was nicknamed "Bank Row" after several bank buildings were built there in the 1900s. Among the banks in the area were the Brooklyn Trust Company, which moved to the corner of Montague and Clinton Street in 1873, as well as the People's Trust Company and the National Title Guaranty Company.

After World War I, developers began constructing skyscrapers, rather than low-rise buildings, in Downtown Brooklyn. Just prior to the construction of the National Guaranty Trust Building, the site at 185 Montague Street was occupied by the National City Bank of New York, which also occupied the neighboring People's Trust Company Building. The site at 187 Montague Street contained the Chauncey Real Estate Building, which was acquired by Brooklyn Chamber of Commerce president Ralph Jonas in early 1926. The latter site, occupied by the Chauncey Real Estate Company until February 1929, was originally supposed to be part of a large office building for the Brooklyn Chamber of Commerce.

== Architecture ==
The National Title Guaranty Building was designed by Harvey Wiley Corbett and Wallace Harrison in the Art Deco style and completed in 1930. Corbett and Harrison have variously been cited as working for the firm Helmle, Corbett & Harrison, or Corbett, Harrison & MacMurray. The lower stories contain stonework panels designed by Rene Chambellan. The building is 16 stories tall and contains numerous setbacks to comply with the 1916 Zoning Resolution. The setbacks on the facade, starting above the 12th story, taper to a temple-like "tower" and were originally illuminated at night.

=== Facade ===
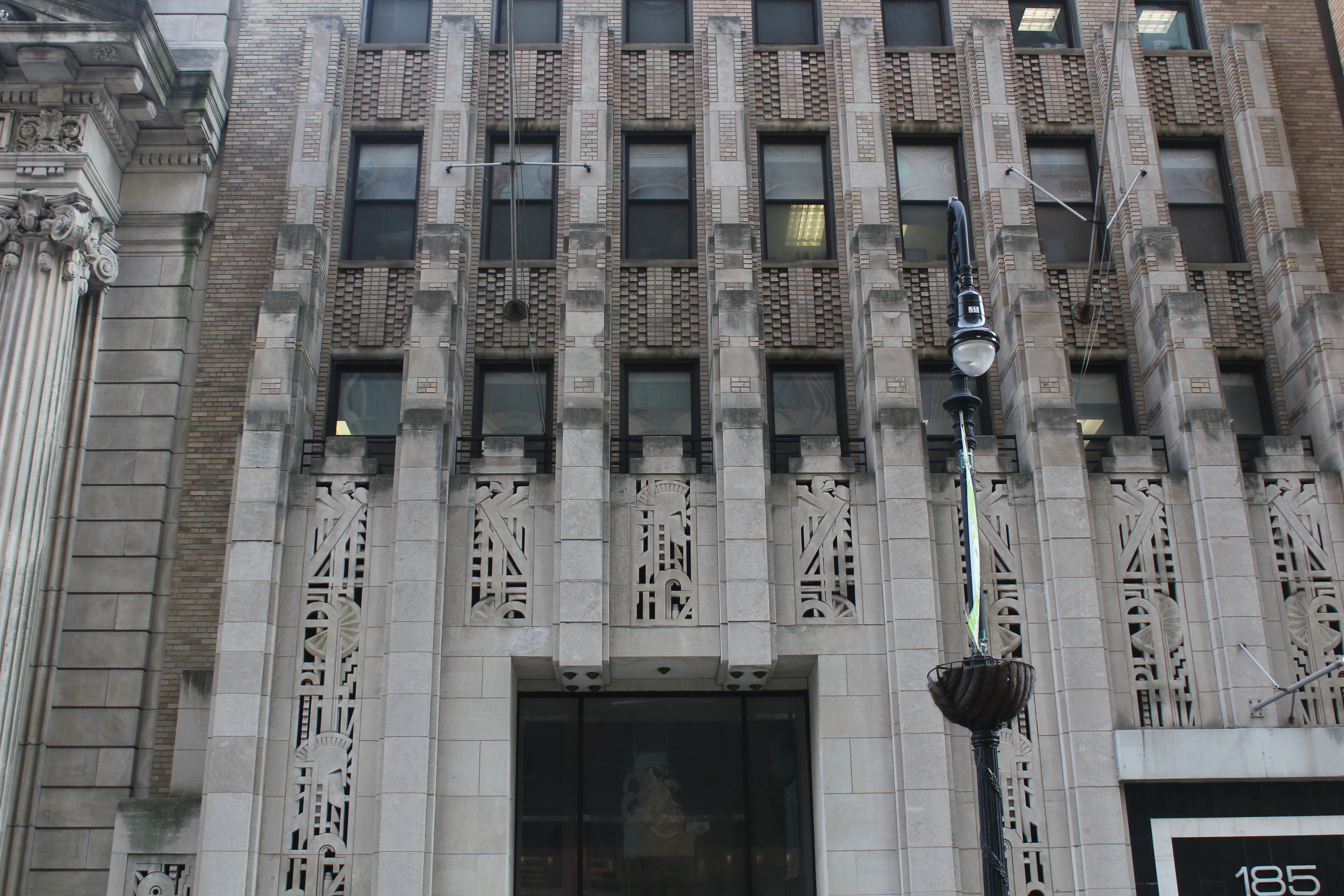
The limestone screen on the lower stories as seen in 2023

The main elevation of the facade on Montague Street is divided vertically into seven bays by brick piers. The first two stories are decorated with a limestone screen, separated by limestone buttresses from which the brick piers rise. The limestone screen contains seven panels (one in each bay), each of which has various motifs such as rosettes, hammers, warriors, eagles, and octagrams. There is a stepped block above each panel, which initially held a floodlight when the building opened. At ground level is a pair of recessed openings; the opening to the left is a storefront with a marquee and is larger than that to the right. The main building's entrance is in the easternmost two bays and was initially topped by a spandrel panel with the name "National Title Guaranty Company". The main entrance originally contained a set of wrought iron doors and was flanked by a pair of nondescript stone doors. The entrance was redesigned with a marble frame before the 1970s, and a flagpole was placed atop the frame. At ground level, there are also panels at the far western and eastern ends of the facade. There was formerly a pair of 14-foot-tall (4.3 m) torchères made of bronze and black granite, which were placed behind the screen.

Above the base, the Montague Street elevation is clad with buff brick. The windows were originally three-over-three sash windows, most of which have since been replaced with simpler one-over-one windows. Within each bay, there are brick spandrel panels between the windows on different floors. The bricks in each spandrel panel are arranged in a checkerboard pattern, with alternating bricks protruding and recessed from the facade; the center of each spandrel contains a "stack bond", a vertical strip of protruding bricks. On the lower floors of the base, the bays are separated by stepped buttresses. The spandrel panels rise above the parapets at each of the setbacks, which give the appearance of crenellation.

Above the base, the north, west, and east elevations contain piers, windows, and spandrel panels in a similar style as the Montague Street elevation, as well as railings at the setbacks. Many original three-over-three windows have been replaced, and the brick has been patched up at certain points, although the "tower" on the top stories largely retains its original design elements. The west elevation is asymmetrical and "U"-shaped, with a light court dividing it into two sections; the spandrels on the southern section of the west elevation also have raised brick bands. There is a rooftop bulkhead and some vents on the west elevation as well. The north elevation has few windows, except at the "tower" where there are windows with decorative spandrels. There is also a metal chimney, ventilation louvers, and some pipes on the roof of the north elevation. The northeastern and southeastern corners of the building also contain some setbacks. The southern section of the east elevation is divided into two bays; the northern section of that elevation has one bay; and the center section has no windows.

=== Interior ===
When 185 Montague Street opened, the National Title Guaranty Company and its subsidiaries occupied the lowest five stories and the basement. The building's main entrance originally led to a vestibule decorated with nickel and Belgian black marble. The vestibule's black marble ceiling, which the architects claimed was the first of its kind in the United States, was intended to make the vestibule appear taller.

On the ground floor and basement was a branch for the National Exchange Bank and Trust Company, which was designed in the modern style. The floor of the bank branch was made of terrazzo tiles laid in geometric patterns, while the ceiling contained colorful motifs representing industry and commerce. Officers' desks were arranged around the front and sides of the bank branch. The bank tellers' counters, at the rear of the ground story, had marble counters instead of bank tellers' grilles. Above the tellers' counters, a marble stairway led up to a mezzanine level, which had bank executives' offices. In the basement was a bank vault.

== History ==
Manasseh Miller established the National Title Guaranty Company in February 1924, with himself as president and Michael Furst as vice president; it was the first insurance company founded in Brooklyn since 1906. The company opened its first office on April 29, 1924, at 174 Montague Street, the former home of the Brooklyn Institute of Arts and Sciences. Initially, the company had a capitalization of $500,000. National Title Guaranty planned to occupy 174 Montague Street for a short time, as it wished to erect a larger building, although the company only acquired its headquarters in May 1925 for $250,000. Within three years, the company had opened a branch in Jamaica, Queens, and was doing business in Queens and in Suffolk County, New York. National Title Guaranty's capitalization had been increased to $2.5 million by the time it opened a permanent ten-story branch in Jamaica in mid-1928.

=== Development and opening ===
With the growth of the National Title Guaranty Company, its old headquarters at 172–174 Montague Street was no longer sufficient to house all of the company's departments. The company was also reluctant to relocate from Montague Street, as the location, with its many banks, was good for its business. National Title Guaranty sold 172–174 Montague Street to Ralph Jonas in January 1929 for approximately $850,000. At the time, Jonas was planning a large office building immediately to the south but had trouble acquiring National Title Guaranty's old building. Early the next month, National Title Guaranty bought the sites at 185 and 187 Montague Street from National City Bank and Jonas, respectively. The insurance company was also planning a new headquarters at 185–187 Montague Street, variously cited as ten or twelve stories.

Helmle, Corbett & Harrison submitted plans for the building on February 8, 1929, at which point the structure was supposed to cost $350,000. The William Kennedy Construction Company was hired as the building's general contractor; in addition, Cox, Nostrand & Gunnison installed the lighting, and William H. Jackson & Co. executed the ironwork. The planned building had been revised to 16 stories by March 1929. The building was to have a brick and limestone facade. Its first two stories and mezzanine would be occupied by National Title Guaranty, while the other floors would be rented out. Work was underway by that April. During the building's construction, National Title Guaranty continued to expand, acquiring the Guaranteed Mortgage Company of New York in March 1929 and organizing the National Exchange Bank and Trust Company that July.

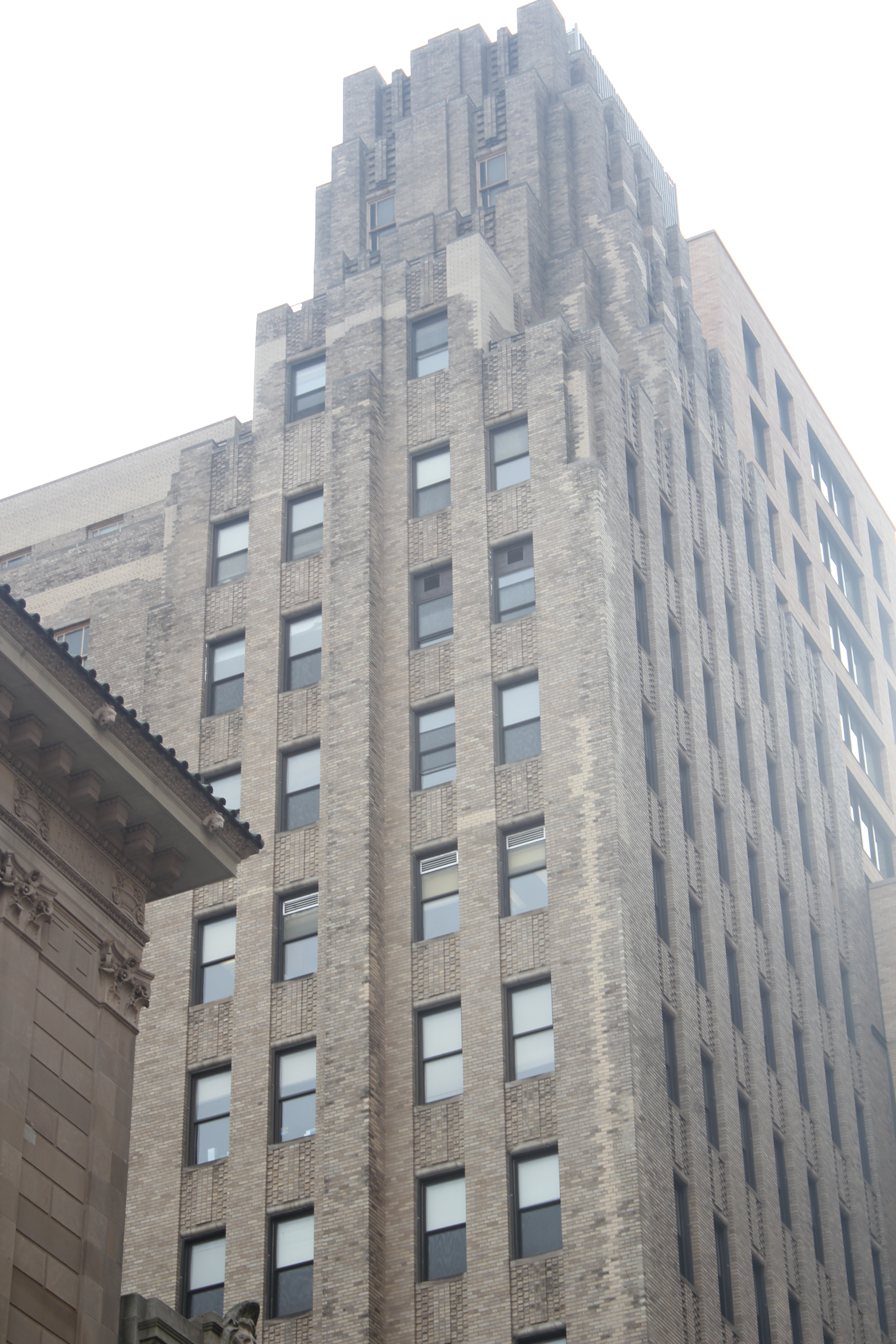
The upper stories of the building as seen from the west

National Title Guaranty had moved its offices to the building by November 1929, relocating some functions from 174 Madison Avenue in Manhattan. The opening of the building's National Exchange Bank and Trust branch was delayed because the bank needed regulatory approval for the branch. 185 Montague Street officially opened on April 3, 1930, and the National Exchange Bank and Trust's branch there also opened that day. At the time of the building's opening, rental agents Riker & Co. had leased out all except approximately 1,500 square feet (140 m^{2}) of space, despite high vacancy rates in the surrounding neighborhood. The National Exchange Bank and Trust branch occupied the basement and ground story, and National Title Guaranty occupied the second through fifth stories. The Mutual Life Insurance Company also had two stories, and the Commercial Casualty Insurance Company, American Surety Company, and lawyer Meier Steinbrink each had one story. The New York Times reported in 1931 that the structure had been fully occupied ever since its opening.

=== 20th century ===
The building had opened amid the Great Depression, but the National Title Guaranty initially appeared to be profitable. The National Exchange Bank had decided to shutter its banking operations by November 1933, and the state's insurance commissioner had taken over National Title Guaranty's operations the same year. The liquidation of National Title Guaranty's business began in January 1935, and a grand jury subsequently indicted and convicted several of the company's officers on fraud charges. One of National Title Guaranty's final assets to be liquidated was the lease that it held on the bank branch at 185 Montague Street. A state judge ruled in April 1936 that the lease could be transferred to the Lawyers Trust Company, which moved to the building at the beginning of that June. The County Savings Deposit Company, which operated a branch bank at 185 Montague Street, requested permission from state officials in 1942 to close that branch.

The Bowery Savings Bank acquired the building around April 1944 after foreclosing on a $500,000 mortgage loan that had been placed on the structure. Development firm Webb and Knapp bought the building in October 1944 and leased the first three stories to the Bank of the Manhattan Company, with the intention of demolishing the upper stories after the existing leases expired. The building's tenants, whose leases collectively expired in mid-1946, objected to the plans. At the time, the building's largest tenants included law firm Delatour & Miller and the American Surety Company. Hunter L. Delatour of Delatour & Miller, along with 44 other tenants, filed a lawsuit against the building's owners 39 Corporation in March 1946, saying the plans violated an emergency statute because 39 Corporation was not replacing the building with a new structure. The lawsuit followed a similar legal action that the occupants of the Ziegler Building in Manhattan had filed to prevent the construction of what became the Manufacturers Trust Company Building.

Ultimately, the building mostly retained its original design, except for the ground floor, which was renovated before the 1970s. The Manhattan Company bank branch opened in April 1947. The building served as the Manhattan Company's Brooklyn headquarters; the bank had eight additional branches across Brooklyn in the late 1940s. Chase Manhattan Bank moved to the building in 1955, closing its neighboring branch at 189 Montague Street, after Chase Manhattan merged with the Bank of the Manhattan Company. By the 1970s, the building's tenants included Brooklyn Community Board 2, as well as the Brooklyn office of the New York City Department of City Planning.

=== 21st century ===
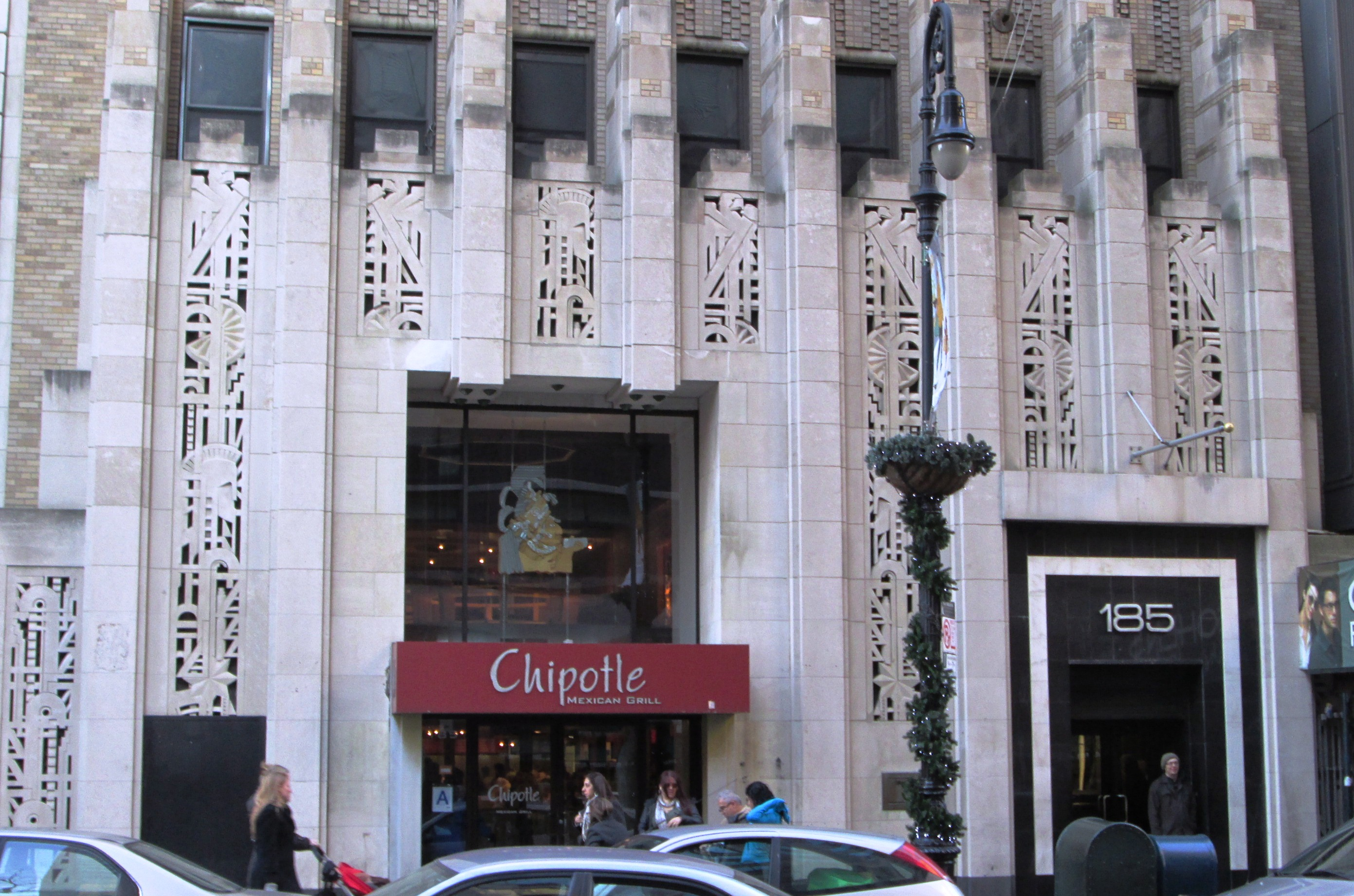
A Chipotle restaurant occupies the ground floor, pictured here in 2013

By the early 21st century, the ground story of 185 Montague Street was occupied by a Chipotle Mexican Grill fast-food franchise. The National Title Guaranty Company Building, along with the adjacent People's Trust Company Building at 181 Montague Street, were nominated for city-landmark protection as part of the Borough Hall Skyscraper Historic District in 2011, but the New York City Landmarks Preservation Commission (LPC) did not include the buildings in the district. Local civic group Brooklyn Heights Association then proposed that both 181 and 185 Montague Street be designated as New York City individual landmarks. The LPC began considering preserving the structures as individual landmarks in August 2016, though the building's owner opposed the designation of 185 Montague Street. The LPC hosted public hearings for the designations of the buildings at 181 and 185 Montague Street that November; the LPC designated both structures as landmarks on January 27, 2017.

== Critical reception ==
When the building was almost completed in November 1929, the Brooklyn Daily Eagle wrote that the building had "many unique features which give it distinction and prominence", such as the concealed doors beside the main entrance and the "severe straight lines" of the upper stories. The New York Herald Tribune said in March 1930: "The treatment of both the exterior and interior of the building is modern, but not modernistic", while The New York Times called the structure "in its bold modern treatment, [...] a real architectural addition to the area of Brooklyn Heights". According to the Herald Tribune and the Times, the building's lighting scheme was to be an "integral part" of the design. The Brooklyn Citizen wrote that the National Exchange bank's interior "represents a new style in simple treatment", with its use of marble and metalwork. Francis Morrone wrote: "This is one of the jazziest little Art Deco skyscrapers in town, its play of projecting piers and receding planes reminiscent of the punching horns of Count Basie's orchestra."

== See also ==
- List of New York City Designated Landmarks in Brooklyn
