= Chapin National Bank Building =

Historic building in Massachusetts, US

- U.S. National Register of Historic Places
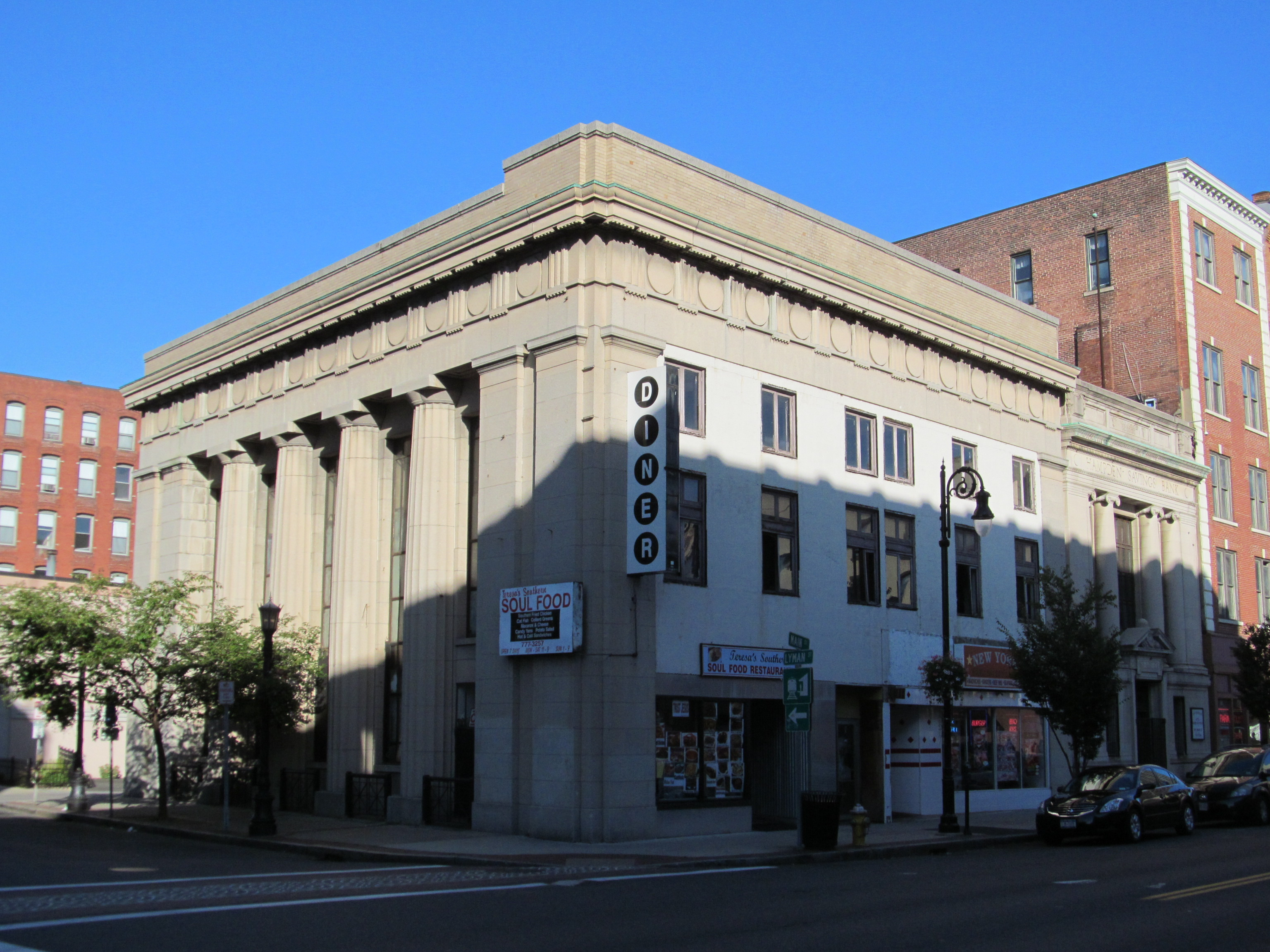
- Chapin National Bank Building

- Location within Massachusetts Location within the United States
- Location: Springfield, Massachusetts
- Coordinates: 42°6′16″N 72°35′42″W
- Area: less than one acre
- Built: 1917
- Architect: Mowbray and Uffinger
- Architectural style: Classical Revival
- MPS: Downtown Springfield MRA
- NRHP reference No.: 83000742
- Added to NRHP: February 24, 1983

The Chapin National Bank Building is a historic bank building at 1675-1677 Main Street in Springfield, Massachusetts. Built in 1917 for a bank founded in 1872 by Chester Chapin, it is a notable local example of Classical Revival architecture. The building was listed on the National Register of Historic Places in 1983. It now houses other commercial businesses.

== Description and history ==
The Chapin National Bank Building is located in downtown Springfield, at the northeast corner of Main and Lyman Streets. It is a two-story masonry structure, built out of cast stone. The Lyman Street facade has a classical Doric frieze, with four monumental fluted columns set in antis. The Main Street facade originally had a similar appearance, except for the main building entrance, but this has been obscured or replaced by modern paneling, leaving only the frieze below the roofline.

Chester Chapin, a native of nearby Ludlow, made a fortune first in stagecoach operations, and then in railroads and other businesses. He founded a bank in 1872, which was formally chartered as Chapin National Bank in 1878. Chapin was a city selectman and served a single term in the United States Congress (1875-77). This building was built in 1917, on the site of a previous building of the same bank. It was designed by Mowbray and Uffinger, architects from New York City, and remains a distinctive example of Classical Revival architecture in the city despite its facade alterations.

== See also ==
- National Register of Historic Places listings in Springfield, Massachusetts
- National Register of Historic Places listings in Hampden County, Massachusetts
