= Spelling bee (disambiguation) =

A spelling bee is a competition in which contestants are asked to spell words.

Spelling bee may refer to:

== Specific spelling bees ==
- Scripps National Spelling Bee, a highly competitive U.S. spelling bee held in Washington, D.C.
- Postmedia Canspell National Spelling Bee, a former Canadian spelling bee with representation at the Scripps competition
- Spelling Bee of Canada, a charitable spelling bee organization in the Greater Toronto Area
- MaRRS Spelling Bee, an Asian Spelling Bee with word usage rounds

== Other ==
- Spelling Bee (card trick), a magic trick in which certain playing cards are made to appear on cue
- Spelling Bee (pricing game), a pricing game on the game show The Price is Right
- Spellingg Bee, an episode of the TV show Psych
- Spelling Bee (game show), a 1938 UK TV show that was the first television game show
- The New York Times Spelling Bee, a word game distributed in print and electronic format by The New York Times
- The 25th Annual Putnam County Spelling Bee, a Broadway musical about a spelling bee
