= Alexa Avilés =

American politician

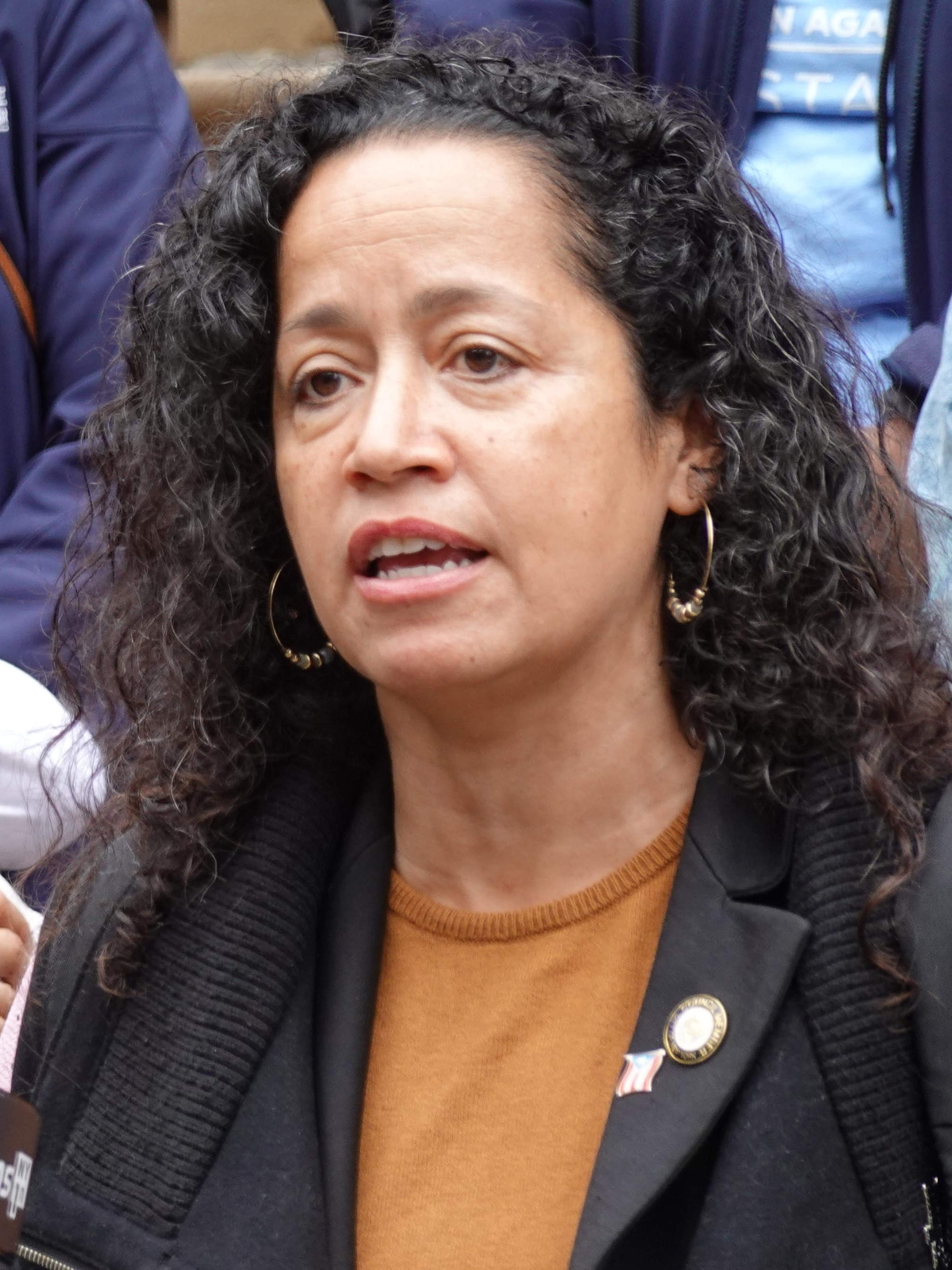

Member of the New York City Council from the 38th district
- Incumbent
- Assumed office January 1, 2022
- Preceded by: Carlos Menchaca
- Parliamentary group: New York City Socialists in Office

Personal details
- Born: January 15, 1973 (age 53) Bayamón, Puerto Rico, U.S.
- Party: Democratic
- Other political affiliations: Democratic Socialists of America
- Spouse: Frankie Correa
- Children: 2
- Education: Columbia University (BA); Baruch College (MPA)
- Website: Official website Campaign website

Alexa Avilés (born January 15, 1973) is an American politician, community activist, and non-profit manager from New York City. She is a member of the New York City Council for the 38th district, which covers Sunset Park along Brooklyn's western shoreline, also covering Red Hook, Greenwood Heights, and small parts of Windsor Terrace, Dyker Heights, and Borough Park neighborhoods in western Brooklyn.

Prior to taking office, Avilés worked in the non-profit sector, served as president of a parent-teacher association and a member of Brooklyn Community Board 7.

== Early life and education ==
Avilés was born in Bayamón, Puerto Rico, and raised in East New York. She was the youngest of seven children born to a substance abuse counselor mother, and the first in her family to attend college. She graduated from Columbia College, Columbia University in 1995, and received a master's degree from CUNY's Baruch College School of Public and International Affairs. She is a National Urban Fellow and an alumna of A Better Chance.

== Career ==
Her first job began as internship in college and then continued after graduation, at a philanthropy that provided environmental grants in under-served communities in Mississippi, and from there she branched out to work in reproductive rights and justice drives for native communities. She later worked for the Justice, Equality, Human dignity and Tolerance Foundation (JEHT), focused on mass incarceration issues as a program manager, focusing on juvenile decarceration. She also worked at the Fund of the Four Directions.

Avilés was a program officer and then program director at the Scherman Foundation from 2011 to 2021, working on advocacy for human rights, reproductive rights, and strengthening programs for the arts.

=== Elected office ===
In 2021, Avilés defeated five other candidates to win the Democratic nomination, prevailing over her closest opponent Yu Lin 65%–35% in the fifth round of ranked choice voting. She received endorsements from U.S. Senator Bernie Sanders, Congressmembers Nydia Velázquez and Alexandria Ocasio-Cortez, State Senators Julia Salazar and Jabari Brisport, Assemblymember Marcela Mitaynes, the Working Families Party, United Federation of Teachers, District Council 37, and other local groups and elected officials. No Republican challenged her in the November 2021 general election, and Avilés won with over 80% of the vote. She took office in January 2022.

In 2025, Avilés again won the Democratic nomination, defeating her primary opponent Ling Ye 71.5%–28%. Ye criticized her for not supporting building more housing, saying, "Avilés often doesn’t want anything built unless it’s truly affordable". Avilés' team pointed out her work on securing funding for affordable housing, homeownership programs, and rent-stabilized housing. Avilés defeated her Republican challenger, Luis Quero, in the 2025 general election, 73.1%–26.9%.

== Personal life ==
She lives with her husband, Frankie, and her two daughters in Sunset Park, where she has lived since 2000.

Avilés is a board member of the Management Assistance Group, and serves on the Racial Justice Advisory Council of the Brooklyn Community Foundation. She was a member of Brooklyn Community Board 7 and served as the president of the PS 172 parent-teacher association.

She is a member of the New York City chapter of Democratic Socialists of America.

== Electoral history ==
=== 2025 ===
2025 New York City Council Democratic primary, District 38
Party	Candidate	Votes	%
Democratic	Alexa Avilés (incumbent)	10,236	71.5
Democratic	Ling Ye	4,006	28.0
Write-in		80	0.6
Total votes		14,322	100.0

2025 New York City Council election, District 38
Party	Candidate	Votes	%
Democratic	Alexa Avilés	15,588	54.8
Working Families	Alexa Avilés	5,260	18.5
Total	Alexa Avilés (incumbent)	20,848	73.3
Republican	Luis E. Quero	6,666	23.4
Conservative	Luis E. Quero	841	3.0
Total	Luis E. Quero	7,507	26.4
Write-in		99	0.3
Total votes		28,454	100.0
Democratic hold			

=== 2023 ===
2023 New York City Council election, District 38
Party	Candidate	Votes	%
Democratic	Alexa Avilés	4,363	48.9
Working Families	Alexa Avilés	1,548	17.4
Total	Alexa Avilés (incumbent)	5,911	66.3
Republican	Paul A. Rodriguez	2,558	28.7
Conservative	Paul A. Rodriguez	381	4.3
Total	Paul A. Rodriguez	2,939	33.0
Write-in		69	0.8
Total votes		8,919	100.0
Democratic hold			

=== 2021 ===
2021 New York City Council Democratic primary, District 38
Party	Candidate	Maximum round	Maximum votes	Share in maximum round	Maximum votes First round votes Transfer votes
Democratic	Alexa Avilés	5	6,857	65.1%	
Democratic	Yu Lin	5	3,683	34.9%	
Democratic	Rodrigo G. Camarena	4	1,619	14.0%	
Democratic	Jacqui Painter	4	1,462	12.6%	
Democratic	César Zuñiga	3	1,154	9.7%	
Democratic	Victor Swinton	2	491	4.1%	
Write-In		1	33	0.3%	

2021 New York City Council election, District 38
Party	Candidate	Votes	%
Democratic	Alexa Avilés	9,228	80.4
Conservative	Erik S. Frankel	1,943	16.9
Libertarian	Erik S. Frankel	266	2.3
Total	Erik S. Frankel	2,209	19.2
Write-in		46	0.4
Total votes		11,483	100.0
Democratic hold			
