= Al-Noor School =

- Brooklyn Cultural Center of New York
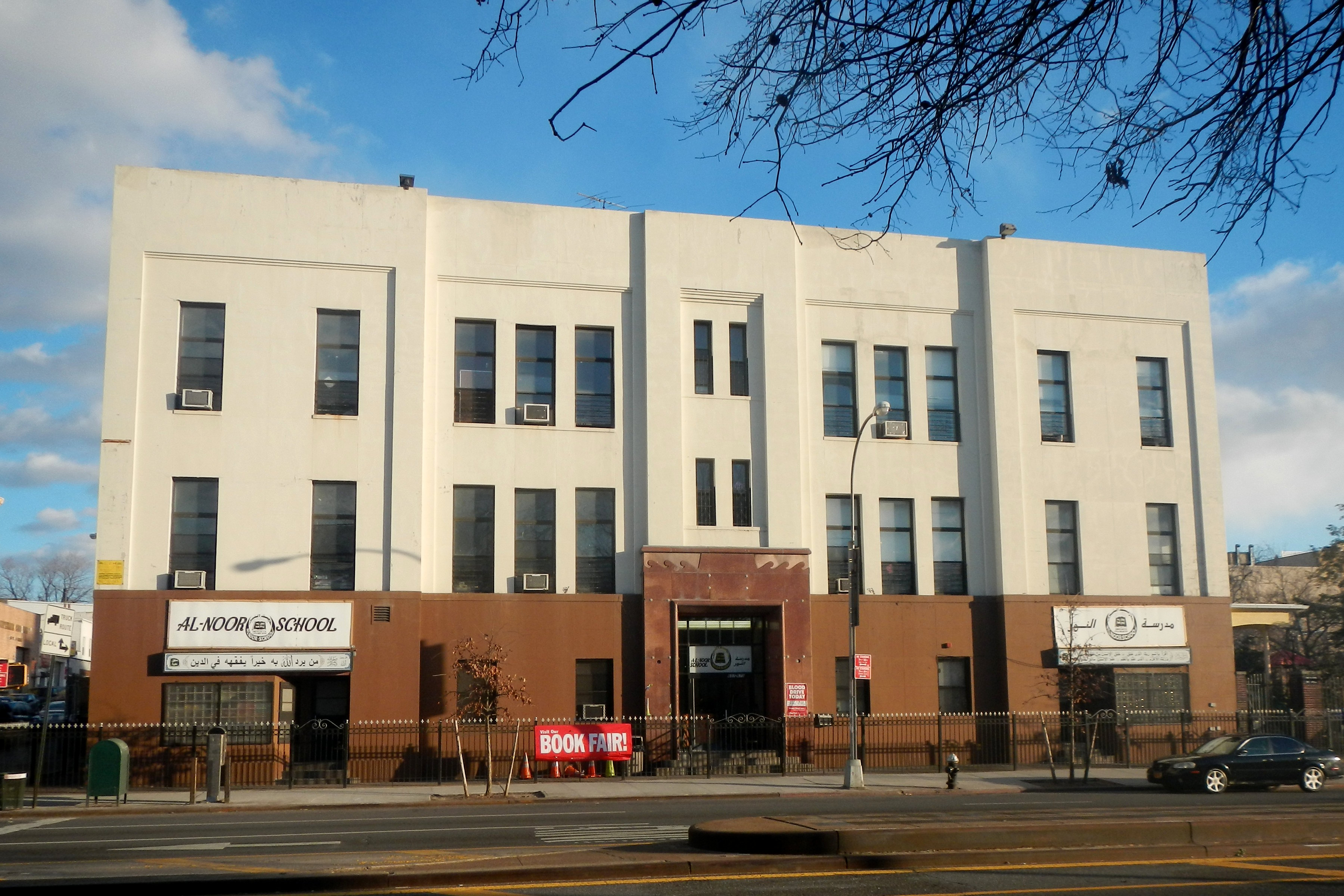
- Front view of Al-Noor school looking South east along 4th Ave.

Location
- 675 4th Avenue; Brooklyn, New York 11232; United States

Information
- School type: Private Coeducational
- Religious affiliation: Islam
- Established: 1 March 1995
- Status: Open
- Principal: Abdulhakeem Alhasel
- Faculty: 50 (2015)
- Grades: Pre-kindergarten – 12
- Enrollment: 650 (2015)
- Student to teacher ratio: 13:1
- Language: English, Arabic
- Annual tuition: PK-7 = $4,800, 8-12 = $5,500
- Website: www.alnoornyc.org

Al-Noor School, Arabic: مدرسة النور, is a co-ed gender segregated private school located in the Greenwood Heights neighborhood of Brooklyn, NY. It is a school dedicated to the teaching of Islamic culture and religion, with its curriculum including Arabic, Islamic Studies, and the Quran, alongside general studies such as Math, Science, Social Studies, and English. Admission to Al Noor is based on an entrance exam, personal interview and previous school records.

The school was founded in 1995 and today serves over 650 students. The school runs from Pre-K to the 12th grade, offering Regent High School diplomas. The first graduating class was in 2002.

== School ==
In addition to the aforementioned subjects, Al Noor's curriculum includes Human Geography, Calculus, Chemistry, World History, Psychology, Physics, and Computer Science. The school offers a program catered towards high school juniors and seniors entering engineering, design, and architecture studies.

The school participates in the annual MIST, Islamic School Quran Memorization, and Islamic School Spelling bee competitions in the Brooklyn area. The school also has a debate team, competitive urban design squad, math club, drama club, Girls Who Code team, and Model UN.

== Community involvement ==
The Park Slope Flea Market launched in 2009 is located in the rear of the Al-Noor School 25,000-square-foot parking lot, bringing more than 60 vendors each Saturday and Sunday to the block between Fourth and Fifth avenues. Merchandise ranging from clothing, jewelry, antiques to middle eastern food and clothing takes place starting in May through the fall.
