= New York City's 38th City Council district =

- Boundaries following the 2020 census

Government
  - Councilmember: . Alexa Avilés. D–Sunset Park

Population (2010)
  - Total: 157,282

Demographics
  - Hispanic: 44%
  - Asian: 33%
  - White: 17%
  - Black: 5%
  - Other: 2%

Registration
  - Democratic: 64.0%
  - Republican: 8.1%
  - No party preference: 25.3%
- Registered voters (2021) 82,999

New York City's 38th City Council district is one of 51 districts in the New York City Council. It is currently represented by Democrat Alexa Avilés, who assumed office in 2022.

== Geography ==
=== 2020s ===
District 38 is based largely in Sunset Park along Brooklyn's western shoreline, also covering Red Hook, Greenwood Heights, and portions of Gowanus, Park Slope, Bay Ridge, Bensonhurst, and Bath Beach. Green-Wood Cemetery and Sunset Park proper are also located within the district.

The district overlaps with Brooklyn Community Boards 6, 7, 10, 11, and 12, and with New York's 10th and 11th congressional districts. It also overlaps with the 17th, 22nd, and 26th districts of the New York State Senate, and with the 44th, 46th, 47th, 49th, 51st, and 52nd districts of the New York State Assembly.

=== 2010s ===
District 38 is based largely in Sunset Park along Brooklyn's western shoreline, also covering Red Hook, Greenwood Heights, and small parts of Windsor Terrace, Dyker Heights, and Borough Park. Green-Wood Cemetery and Sunset Park proper are also located within the district.

The district overlaps with Brooklyn Community Boards 6, 7, 10, 11, and 12, and with New York's 7th, 9th, and 10th congressional districts. It also overlaps with the 17th, 20th, 21st, 22nd, 23rd, and 25th districts of the New York State Senate, and with the 44th, 48th, 49th, 51st, and 52nd districts of the New York State Assembly.

== Members representing the district ==
Members	Party	Years served	Electoral history
District established January 1, 1992
Joan G. McCabe (Park Slope)	Democratic	January 1, 1992 – December 31, 1997	Elected in 1991. Re-elected in 1993. Retired.
Angel Rodriguez (Sunset Park)	Democratic	January 1, 1998 – August 28, 2002	Elected in 1997. Re-elected in 2001. Resigned due to corruption charges.
Vacant		August 28, 2002 – November 6, 2002	
Sara M. Gonzalez (Sunset Park)	Democratic	November 6, 2002 – December 31, 2013	Elected to finish Rodriguez's term. Re-elected in 2003. Re-elected in 2005. Re-elected in 2009. Lost renomination.
Carlos Menchaca (Red Hook)	Democratic	January 1, 2014 – December 31, 2021	Elected in 2013. Re-elected in 2017. Retired to run for Mayor of New York.
Alexa Avilés (Sunset Park)	Democratic	January 1, 2022 –	Elected in 2021. Re-elected in 2023. Re-elected in 2025.

== Recent election results ==
=== 2025 ===
2025 New York City Council election, District 38
Primary election
Party	Candidate	Votes	%
Democratic	Alexa Avilés (incumbent)	10,236	71.5
Democratic	Ling Ye	4,006	28.0
Write-in		80	0.6
Total votes		14,322	100
General election
Democratic	Alexa Avilés	15,588	
Working Families	Alexa Avilés	5,260	
Total	Alexa Avilés (incumbent)	20,848	73.5
Republican	Luis Quero	6,666	
Conservative	Luis Quero	841	
Total	Luis Quero	7,507	26.5
Write-in		17	0.0
Total votes		28,372	100.0
Democratic hold			

=== 2023 (redistricting) ===
Due to redistricting and the 2020 changes to the New York City Charter, councilmembers elected during the 2021 and 2023 City Council elections will serve two-year terms, with full four-year terms resuming after the 2025 New York City Council elections.

2023 New York City Council election, District 38
Party	Candidate	Votes	%
Democratic	Alexa Avilés	4,363	
Working Families	Alexa Avilés	1,548	
Total	Alexa Avilés (incumbent)	5,911	66.3
Republican	Paul Rodriguez	2,558	
Conservative	Paul Rodriguez	381	
Total	Paul Rodriguez	2,939	33.0
Write-in		69	0.7
Total votes		8,919	100.0
Democratic hold			

=== 2021 ===
In 2019, voters in New York City approved Ballot Question 1, which implemented ranked-choice voting in all local elections. Under the new system, voters have the option to rank up to five candidates for every local office. Voters whose first-choice candidates fare poorly will have their votes redistributed to other candidates in their ranking until one candidate surpasses the 50 percent threshold. If one candidate surpasses 50 percent in first-choice votes, then ranked-choice tabulations will not occur.

2021 New York City Council election, District 38 Democratic primary
Party	Candidate	Maximum round	Maximum votes	Share in maximum round	Maximum votes First round votes Transfer votes
Democratic	Alexa Avilés	5	6,857	65.1%	
Democratic	Yu Lin	5	3,683	34.9%	
Democratic	Rodrigo Camarena	4	1,619	14.0%	
Democratic	Jacqui Painter	4	1,462	12.6%	
Democratic	César Zuñiga	3	1,154	9.7%	
Democratic	Victor Swinton	2	491	4.1%	
Write-in		1	33	0.3%	

An interactive map of District 38

2021 New York City Council election, District 38 general election
Party	Candidate	Votes	%
Democratic	Alexa Avilés	9,228	80.4
Conservative	Erik Frankel	1,943	
Libertarian	Erik Frankel	266	
Total	Erik Frankel	2,209	19.2
Write-in		45	0.4
Total votes		11,482	100
Democratic hold			

=== 2017 ===
2017 New York City Council election, District 38
Primary election
Party	Candidate	Votes	%
Democratic	Carlos Menchaca (incumbent)	4,176	48.5
Democratic	Félix Ortiz	2,828	32.8
Democratic	Chris Miao	775	9.0
Democratic	Sara Gonzalez	524	6.1
Democratic	Delvis Valdes	292	3.4
Write-in		20	0.2
Total votes		8,615	100
General election
Democratic	Carlos Menchaca	8,541	
Working Families	Carlos Menchaca	1,294	
Total	Carlos Menchaca (incumbent)	9,835	82.3
Conservative	Allan Romaguera	839	7.0
Green	Carmen Hulbert	782	6.5
Reform	Delvis Valdes	460	3.8
Write-in		39	0.4
Total votes		11,955	100
Democratic hold			

=== 2013 ===
2013 New York City Council election, District 38
Primary election
Party	Candidate	Votes	%
Democratic	Carlos Menchaca	4,306	58.8
Democratic	Sara Gonzalez (incumbent)	3,017	41.2
Write-in		3	0.0
Total votes		7,326	100
General election
Democratic	Carlos Menchaca	8,265	
Working Families	Carlos Menchaca	1,121	
Total	Carlos Menchaca	9,386	90.2
Conservative	Henry Lallave	1,002	9.6
Write-in		18	0.2
Total votes		10,406	100
Democratic hold			
