= New York's 51st State Assembly district =

American legislative district

Assemblymember
Marcela Mitaynes; D–Sunset Park

New York's 51st State Assembly district is one of the 150 districts in the New York State Assembly. It has been represented by Marcela Mitaynes since 2021, defeating 26-year incumbent Félix Ortiz.

== Geography ==
=== 2020s ===
District 51 is in Brooklyn. The district includes Red Hook, Greenwood Heights, Sunset Park, and northern Bay Ridge. It also encompasses portions of Carroll Gardens and South Slope. Green-Wood Cemetery and Sunset Park proper are also located within the district.

The district is entirely with New York's 10th congressional district. It also overlaps the 17th, 20th, 22nd and 26th districts of the New York State Senate and the 38th, 39th and 47th districts of the New York City Council.

=== 2010s ===
District 51 is in Brooklyn. The district includes Red Hook, Sunset Park, and northern Bay Ridge.

== Recent election results ==
=== 2026 ===
2026 New York State Assembly election, District 51
Party	Candidate	Votes	%
Democratic	Marcela Mitaynes		
Working Families	Marcela Mitaynes		
Total	Marcela Mitaynes (incumbent)		
Republican	Carla Danielson		
Conservative	Carla Danielson		
Total	Carla Danielson		
Write-in			
Total votes			100.0

=== 2024 ===
2024 New York State Assembly election, District 51
Party	Candidate	Votes	%
Democratic	Marcela Mitaynes	17,669	
Working Families	Marcela Mitaynes	4,338	
Total	Marcela Mitaynes (incumbent)	22,007	76.8
Republican	Erik Frankel	5,749	
Conservative	Erik Frankel	805	
Total	Erik Frankel	6,554	22.9
Write-in		91	0.3
Total votes		28,652	100.0
Democratic hold			

=== 2022 ===
2022 New York State Assembly election, District 51
Primary election
Party	Candidate	Votes	%
Democratic	Marcela Mitaynes (incumbent)	4,573	81.5
Democratic	Erik Frankel	1,011	18.0
Write-in		25	0.4
Total votes		5,609	100.0
General election
Democratic	Marcela Mitaynes	11,545	
Working Families	Marcela Mitaynes	3,764	
Total	Marcela Mitaynes (incumbent)	15,174	78.5
Republican	Timothy Peterson	3,764	
Conservative	Timothy Peterson	350	
Total	Timothy Peterson	4,114	21.3
Write-in		45	0.2
Total votes		19,333	100.0
Democratic hold			

=== 2020 ===
2020 New York State Assembly election, District 51
Primary election
Party	Candidate	Votes	%
Democratic	Marcela Mitaynes	3,607	34.9
Democratic	Félix Ortiz (incumbent)	3,327	32.2
Democratic	Katherine Walsh	2,446	23.7
Democratic	Genesis Aquino	935	9.0
Write-in		22	0.2
Total votes		10,337	100.0
General election
Democratic	Marcela Mitaynes	21,296	
Working Families	Marcela Mitaynes	6,658	
Total	Marcela Mitaynes	27,954	99.0
Write-in		284	1.0
Total votes		28,238	100.0
Democratic hold			

=== 2018 ===
2018 New York State Assembly election, District 51
Party	Candidate	Votes	%
Democratic	Félix Ortiz (incumbent)	20,738	99.1
Write-in		182	0.9
Total votes		20,970	100.0
Democratic hold			

=== 2016 ===
2016 New York State Assembly election, District 51
Party	Candidate	Votes	%
Democratic	Félix Ortiz (incumbent)	24,181	87.9
Republican	Henry Lallave	2,755	
Conservative	Henry Lallave	533	
Total	Henry Lallave	3,288	11.9
Write-in		49	0.2
Total votes		27,518	100.0
Democratic hold			

=== 2014 ===
2014 New York State Assembly election, District 51
Primary election
Party	Candidate	Votes	%
Democratic	Félix Ortiz (incumbent)	2,648	71.3
Democratic	Cesar Zuniga	1,041	28.0
Write-in		24	0.7
Total votes		3,713	100.0
General election
Democratic	Félix Ortiz (incumbent)	7,887	87.8
Conservative	Sandra Palacios-Serrano	1,073	11.9
Write-in		25	0.3
Total votes		8,985	100.0
Democratic hold			

=== 2012 ===
2012 New York State Assembly election, District 51
Party	Candidate	Votes	%
Democratic	Félix Ortiz (incumbent)	18,918	87.6
Republican	Henry Lallave	2,143	
Conservative	Henry Lallave	492	
Total	Henry Lallave	2,635	12.2
Write-in		35	0.2
Total votes		21,588	100.0
Democratic hold			

=== 2010 ===
2010 New York State Assembly election, District 51
Party	Candidate	Votes	%
Democratic	Félix Ortiz	7,448	
Working Families	Félix Ortiz	1,051	
Total	Félix Ortiz (incumbent)	8,499	83.7
Republican	Henry Lallave	1,346	
Conservative	Henry Lallave	309	
Total	Henry Lallave	1,655	16.3
Write-in		2	0.0
Total votes		10,156	100.0
Democratic hold			

=== 2008 ===
2008 New York State Assembly election, District 51
Party	Candidate	Votes	%
Democratic	Félix Ortiz	15,317	
Working Families	Félix Ortiz	985	
Total	Félix Ortiz (incumbent)	16,302	86.9
Republican	Luis Garcia	2,161	11.5
Conservative	Grace Coen	290	1.6
Write-in		0	0.0
Total votes		18,753	100.0
Democratic hold			

=== 2006 ===
2006 New York State Assembly election, District 51
Party	Candidate	Votes	%
Democratic	Félix Ortiz (incumbent)	7,431	86.3
Republican	Washington Artus	986	
Conservative	Washington Artus	198	
Total	Washington Artus	1,184	13.7
Write-in		0	0.0
Total votes		8,615	100.0
Democratic hold			

=== 2004 ===
2004 New York State Assembly election, District 51
Party	Candidate	Votes	%
Democratic	Félix Ortiz (incumbent)	14,442	84.2
Republican	Allan Romaguera	2,420	
Conservative	Allan Romaguera	290	
Total	Allan Romaguera	2,710	15.8
Write-in		0	0.0
Total votes		17,152	100.0
Democratic hold			

=== 2002 ===
2002 New York State Assembly election, District 51
Party	Candidate	Votes	%
Democratic	Félix Ortiz	5,838	
Working Families	Félix Ortiz	498	
Independence	Félix Ortiz	307	
Liberal	Félix Ortiz	186	
Total	Félix Ortiz (incumbent)	6,829	81.5
Republican	Washington Artus	1,348	
Conservative	Washington Artus	204	
Total	Washington Artus	1,552	18.5
Write-in		2	0.0
Total votes		8,383	100.0
Democratic win (new boundaries)			

=== 2000 ===
2000 New York State Assembly election, District 51
Party	Candidate	Votes	%
Democratic	Félix Ortiz	16,761	
Working Families	Félix Ortiz	1,316	
Liberal	Félix Ortiz	379	
Independence	Félix Ortiz	227	
Total	Félix Ortiz (incumbent)	18,683	90.9
Republican	Hilario Laboy	1,673	
Conservative	Hilario Laboy	193	
Total	Hilario Laboy	1,866	9.1
Write-in		0	0.0
Total votes		20,549	100.0
Democratic hold			

=== Federal results in Assembly District 51 ===
Year	Office	Results
2024	President	Harris 71.2 - 25.9%
2024	Senate	Gillibrand 76.4 - 22.1%
2022	Senate	Schumer 79.6 - 19.5%
2020	President	Biden 79.5 - 19.1%
2018	Senate	Gillibrand 88.6 - 11.2%
2016	President	Clinton 82.5 - 13.9%
2016	Senate	Schumer 85.6 - 10.0%
2012	President	Obama 85.6 - 12.9%
2012	Senate	Gillibrand 88.2 - 10.1%
