= Carlos Menchaca =

American politician

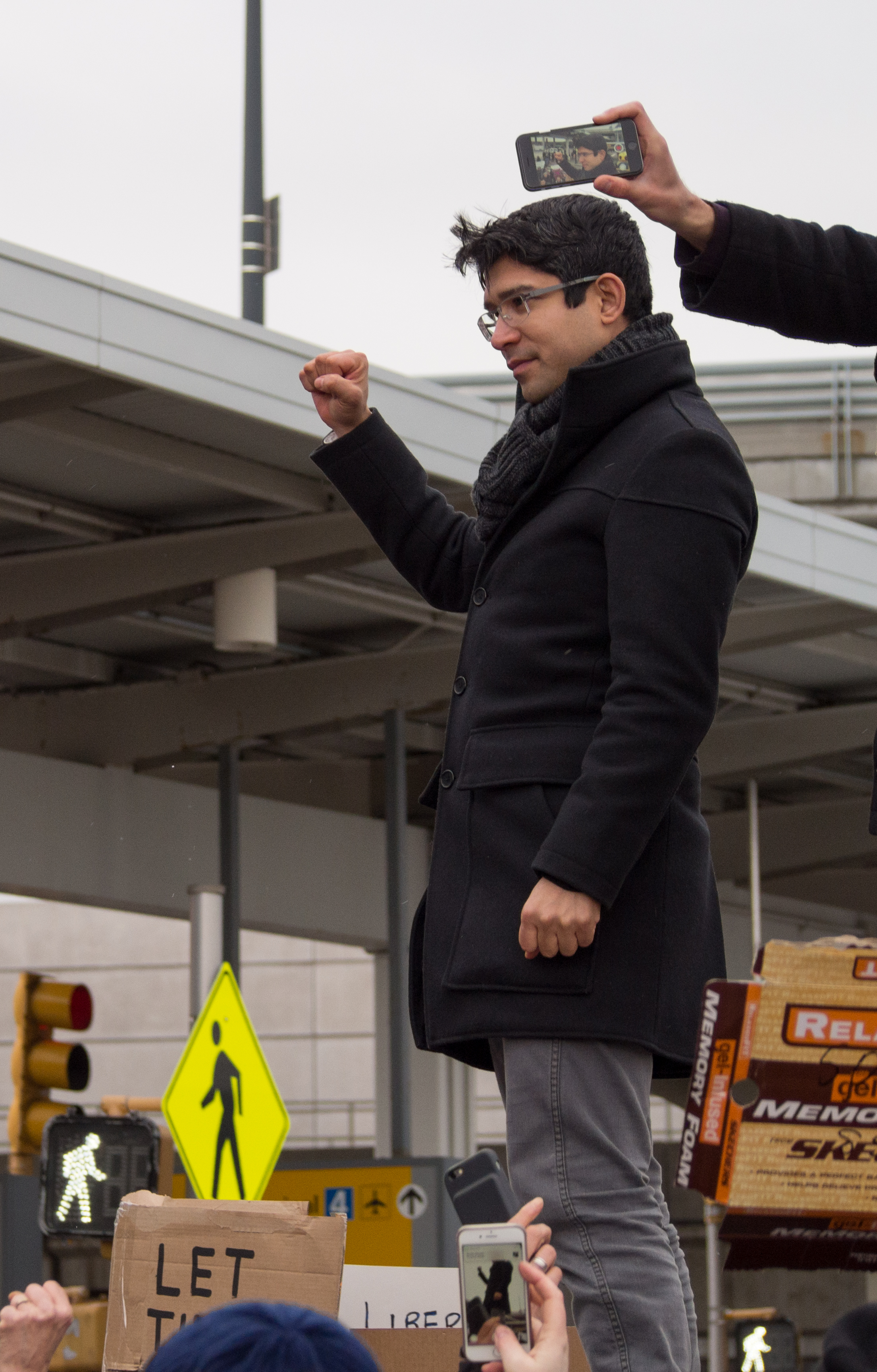

Member of the New York City Council from the 38th District
- In office January 1, 2014 – December 31, 2021
- Preceded by: Sara M. Gonzalez
- Succeeded by: Alexa Avilés

Personal details
- Born: September 11, 1980 (age 46) El Paso, Texas, U.S.
- Party: Democratic
- Education: University of San Francisco (BA)
- Website: Official website

Carlos Menchaca (born September 11, 1980) is an American politician who served as a member of the New York City Council for the 38th district. He is a Democrat. His district included the Brooklyn neighborhoods of Sunset Park, Red Hook, Greenwood Heights, and portions of Borough Park, Dyker Heights, and Windsor Terrace. In October 2020, Menchaca declared his candidacy in the 2021 New York City Democratic mayoral primary, but he suspended his campaign in March 2021, three months before the primary.

== Early life and education ==
Menchaca was born and raised in El Paso, Texas. The first in his family to attend college, he earned a Bachelor of Arts degree from the University of San Francisco, where he studied performing arts and social justice.

== Career ==
Prior to assuming office, Menchaca worked in the Brooklyn Borough President's Office, as Marty Markowitz’s Capital Budget and Policy Coordinator from 2005 to 2011. From 2011 to 2013, Menchaca served as a liaison to the LGBT and HIV/AIDS community for the Office of the Speaker in the New York City Council.

Menchaca, along with Councilman Brad Lander, was arrested in January 2015 at a rally for carwash workers.

=== New York City Council ===
In the 2013 election, Menchaca defeated incumbent Sara M. Gonzalez in the Democratic primary for District 38 in the New York City Council, which includes a portion of Brooklyn. He won the seat in the general election on November 5, 2013. Upon his election, Menchaca became the first Mexican-American elected to public office in New York City, and the first openly gay New York City Council member from Brooklyn.

Menchaca has been criticized for derailing redevelopment of the South Brooklyn Marine Terminal. In July 2020, Menchaca said he "strongly opposes" plans to rezone and redevelop Industry City. Due to City Council customs, Menchaca had the power to effectively end the project.

Menchaca chaired the immigration committee in the city council and serves on the following committees: Recovery & Resiliency, Small Business, Standards & Ethics, General Welfare, and Transportation. He formerly served as the chairman of the Brooklyn Council delegation.

== 2021 mayoral campaign ==
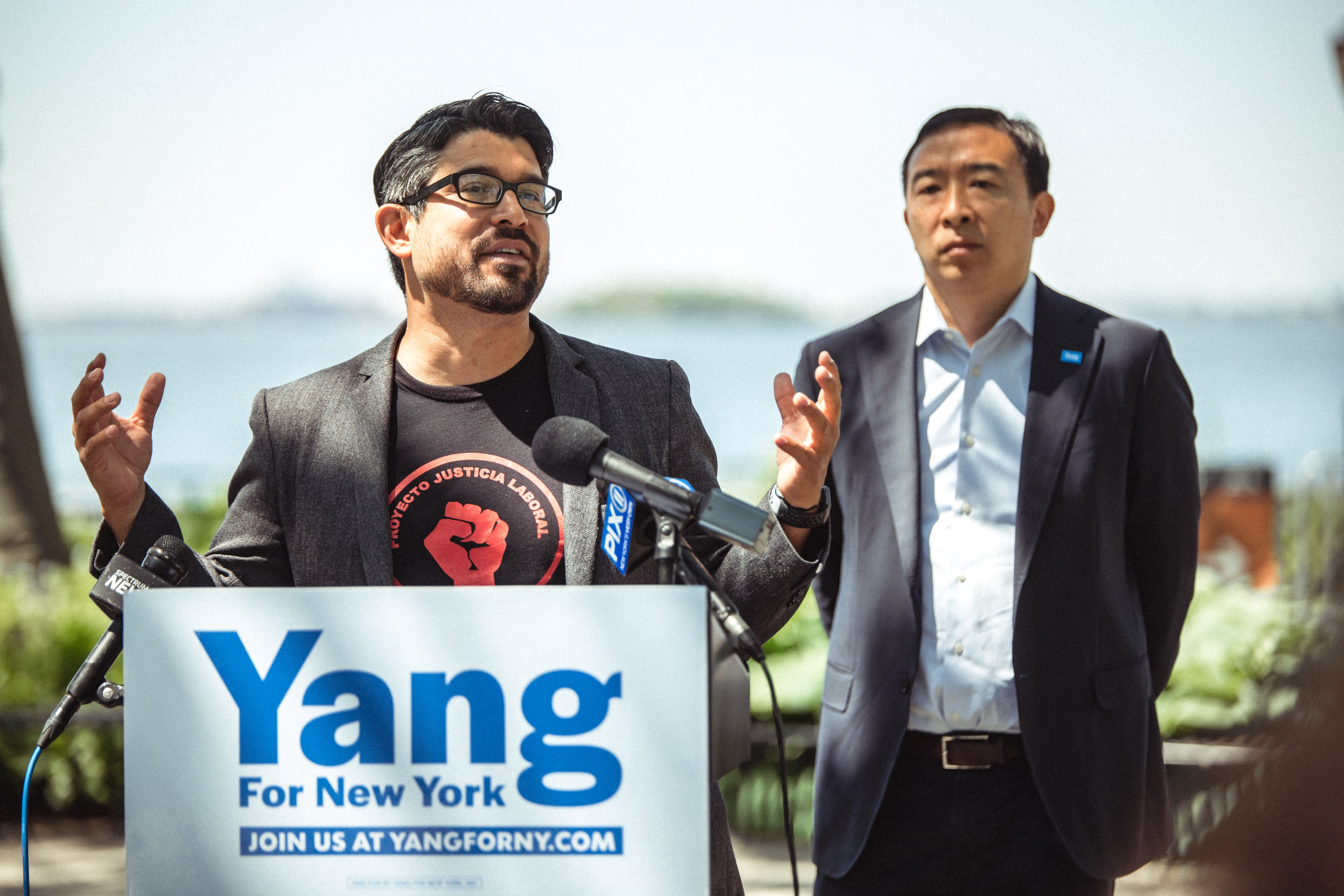
Menchaca speaks to reporters at a press event with Andrew Yang on May 18th, 2021 at Battery Park in New York City.

On October 9, 2020, Menchaca registered a campaign with the New York City Campaign Finance Board and released a statement on social media about a potential run for mayor in the 2021 New York City Democratic mayoral primary. On October 22, he posted a video on his Twitter account officially announcing his candidacy for mayor. As of mid-January 2021, Menchaca had raised approximately $62,000 from donors, spent $48,000 on his campaign, and had about $14,500 left. Menchaca ended his campaign on March 24, 2021 and later endorsed Andrew Yang for mayor.

== Election results ==
Election history
Location	Year	Election	Results
NYC Council District 38	2013	Democratic primary	√ Carlos Menchaca 58.80% Sara M. Gonzalez 41.20%
NYC Council District 38	2013	General	√ Carlos Menchaca 90.20% Henry Lallave (Conservative) 9.63%
NYC Council District 38	2017	Democratic primary	√ Carlos Menchaca 48.47% Felix W. Ortiz 32.83% Chris Maio 9.00% Sara Gonzalez 6.08% Delvis Valdes 3.39%
NYC Council District 38	2017	General	√ Carlos Menchaca 82.27% Allan Romaguera (Conservative) 7.02% Carmen Hulbert (Green) 6.54% Delvis Valdes (Reform) 3.85%

== See also ==
- LGBT culture in New York City
- List of LGBT people from New York City
- NYC Pride March

Political offices
Preceded by Sara M. Gonzalez	New York City Council, 38th district 2014–21	Succeeded by Alexa Avilés
