= Asia Spelling Cup =

Annual spelling bee in Asia

- Genre: Spelling bee
- Frequency: Annual (late October or November)
- Location: Asia
- Inaugurated: 2013
- Patron: Qooco
- Website: www.asiaspell.com

The Asia Spelling Cup is the largest annual spelling bee in Southeast Asia, and is organised by Qooco, a mobile language learning company. The first Asia Spelling Cup took place in Singapore in 2013, the next event took place in Bali, Indonesia in 2014, and the next in Bangkok, Thailand in 2015. The 2016 Asia Spelling Cup took place in Bangkok, Thailand, at the Conrad Hotel on November 12, 2016, and the 2017 event took place in Kuala Lumpur, Malaysia on November 12, 2017.

The Asia Spelling Cup draws on primary and secondary school students in various countries in Asia, including Malaysia, Thailand, China and Indonesia. The 2013 event included Singaporean students.

== Pre-selection process ==
The pre-selection process is done online and via mobile, using testing software developed and provided by Qooco.

After completing the online tests, students are ranked by score, with the top students chosen for the finals. Pre-selection rounds regularly exceed 100,000 applicants.

== Finals ==
The finals are usually held in a major city in Southeast Asia, in a hotel conference room or resort.

The Finals are split into two parts, the first part is the Primary school level competition, and the second part is the Secondary school level competition.

== Asia Spelling Cup timeline ==
Year	Location	Venue	Participating Nations
2013	Singapore	Holiday Inn Orchard City Center	China, Japan, Hong Kong, Malaysia, Cambodia, Thailand, Indonesia, Vietnam, Singapore
2014	Bali, Indonesia	Grand Nikko Hotel	China, Malaysia, Indonesia
2015	Bangkok, Thailand	Grand Hyatt Erawan Bangkok Hotel	China, Malaysia, Indonesia, Thailand
2016	Bangkok, Thailand	Conrad Bangkok Hotel	China, Malaysia, Indonesia, Thailand
2017	Kuala Lumpur, Malaysia	Intercontinental Hotel Kuala Lumpur	China, Malaysia, Indonesia, Thailand

== List of Champions ==
Year	Level	Winner	Nationality
2013	Primary School	Elizabeth Yong Shi En	Singapore
2013	Secondary School	Kenneth Wu Min Jin	Malaysia
2014	Primary School	Hu Zi Yue	China
2014	Secondary School	Samuel Tang	Indonesia
2015	Primary School	Felicia Danielle	Indonesia
2015	Secondary School	Samuel Tang	Indonesia
2016	Primary School	Anna Ng	Malaysia
2016	Secondary School	Ng Wan Wei	Malaysia
2017	Primary School	Jaratpat Akkanimanee	Thailand
2017	Secondary School	Zhu Weizheng	China
