= Robert Carroll (American politician) =

American politician

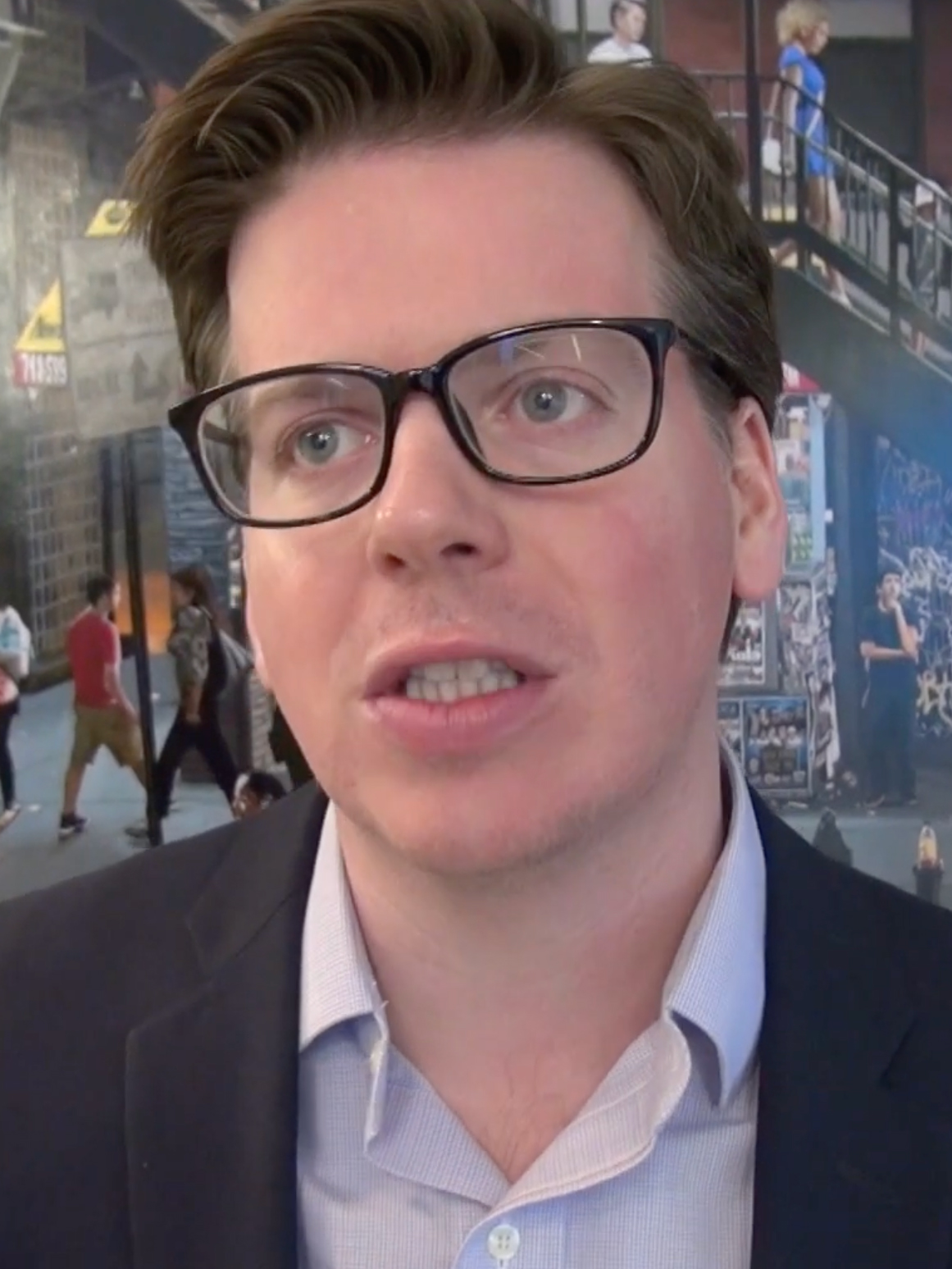
- Carroll in 2019

Member of the New York State Assembly from the 44th district
- Incumbent
- Assumed office January 1, 2017
- Preceded by: James F. Brennan

Personal details
- Born: October 26, 1986 (age 40) Brooklyn, New York, U.S.
- Party: Democratic
- Education: Binghamton University (BS); New York Law School (JD)
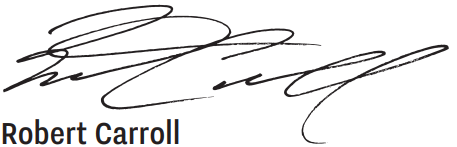
- Signature
- Website: State Assembly website

Robert C. Carroll (born October 26, 1986) is an American politician and attorney. He is a Democratic member of the New York State Assembly, representing the 44th District. The district includes portions of the neighborhoods of Park Slope, Windsor Terrace, Kensington, Borough Park, Victorian Flatbush, Ditmas Park, Prospect Heights and Midwood, as well as the entirety of Prospect Park.

== Early life and education ==
Carroll is a lifelong resident of Brooklyn and was raised in the Windsor Terrace and Kensington neighborhoods. He attended P.S. 230 and Xaverian High School before graduating from Binghamton University and receiving his J.D. from New York Law School.

He currently resides in Park Slope with his wife and children.

== Career ==
Carroll was a practicing attorney at a firm in Manhattan and the Development Director of a non-profit theatrical organization.

Carroll became the youngest president of the Central Brooklyn Independent Democrats. He also served as a member of Brooklyn Community Board 7.

== New York State Assembly ==
Retiring Assemblyman James F. Brennan stepped down in 2016, creating the first vacancy in 32 years.

Carroll easily secured the Democratic nomination. He also won the nomination of the Working Families Party.

Carroll is the Chair of the Subcommittee on Museums and Cultural Institutions as well as the Commission on Government Administration.

Carroll has written and co-sponsored several bills designed to help children with dyslexia. In 2020, Carroll wrote a bill that would enforce tests in schools that would help to screen young students for dyslexia. The Yale Center for Dyslexia and Creativity praised Carroll and the bill, calling the bill "groundbreaking news for all who care about [d]yslexia and the future of children who are [d]yslexic."

In 2019 Carroll worked with the Brooklyn Irish LGBTQ+ Organization (BILO) and the Irish American Parade Committee to allow for BILO to walk in the Brooklyn St. Patrick's Day Parade. This marked the first time an openly LGBTQ+ organization marched in the parade. Carroll's grandfather co-founded the parade in 1976. On the committee's decision, Carroll stated, "I am so glad that everyone was able to come together to honor Irish heritage and culture and make this the first fully inclusive St. Patrick's Day parade in Brooklyn."

Carroll has spoken in favor of building more affordable housing, but has opposed increases in housing supply in his own district. In 2024, he opposed a plan to build two 13-story residential buildings on the lot of a vacant factory building on Prospect Ave. The proposed buildings would provide 244 units (of which 20-30% were set aside for affordable housing) for more than 1,000 residents. Carroll has argued that more housing would lead to gentrification and displacement.

== Election results ==
Election results
Date	Election	Party	Votes for Carroll	%	Opponent	Party	Votes	%
September 2016	Primary election	✓ Democratic	6,031	90.03%	R.M. Curry-Smithson	Democratic	369	5.51%
November 2016	General election	✓ Democratic	34,779	85.45%	Glenn Nocera	Republican	5,921	14.55%
November 2018	General election	✓ Democratic	29,972	85.8%	Yevgeny Goldberg	Republican	4,890	14%
November 2020	General election	✓ Democratic	37,457	79.13%	Salvatore Barrera	Republican	9,804	20.7%
November 2022	General election	✓ Democratic	35,672	86.01%	Brenda Horton	Republican	5,546	13.37%
November 2024	General election	✓ Democratic	47,081	84.9%	John L. Bennett	Republican	8,087	14.6%
November 2026	General election	✓ Democratic	41,913	89.6%	Glenn Nocera	Republican	4,774	10.1%
