= Yoswein =

Yoswein is a surname. Notable people with the surname include:

- Joni Yoswein (born 1955), American politician
- Leonard Yoswein (1920–2011), American politician, uncle of the above
