= 1908 National Education Association Spelling Bee =

American spelling competition

1908 NEA Spelling Bee
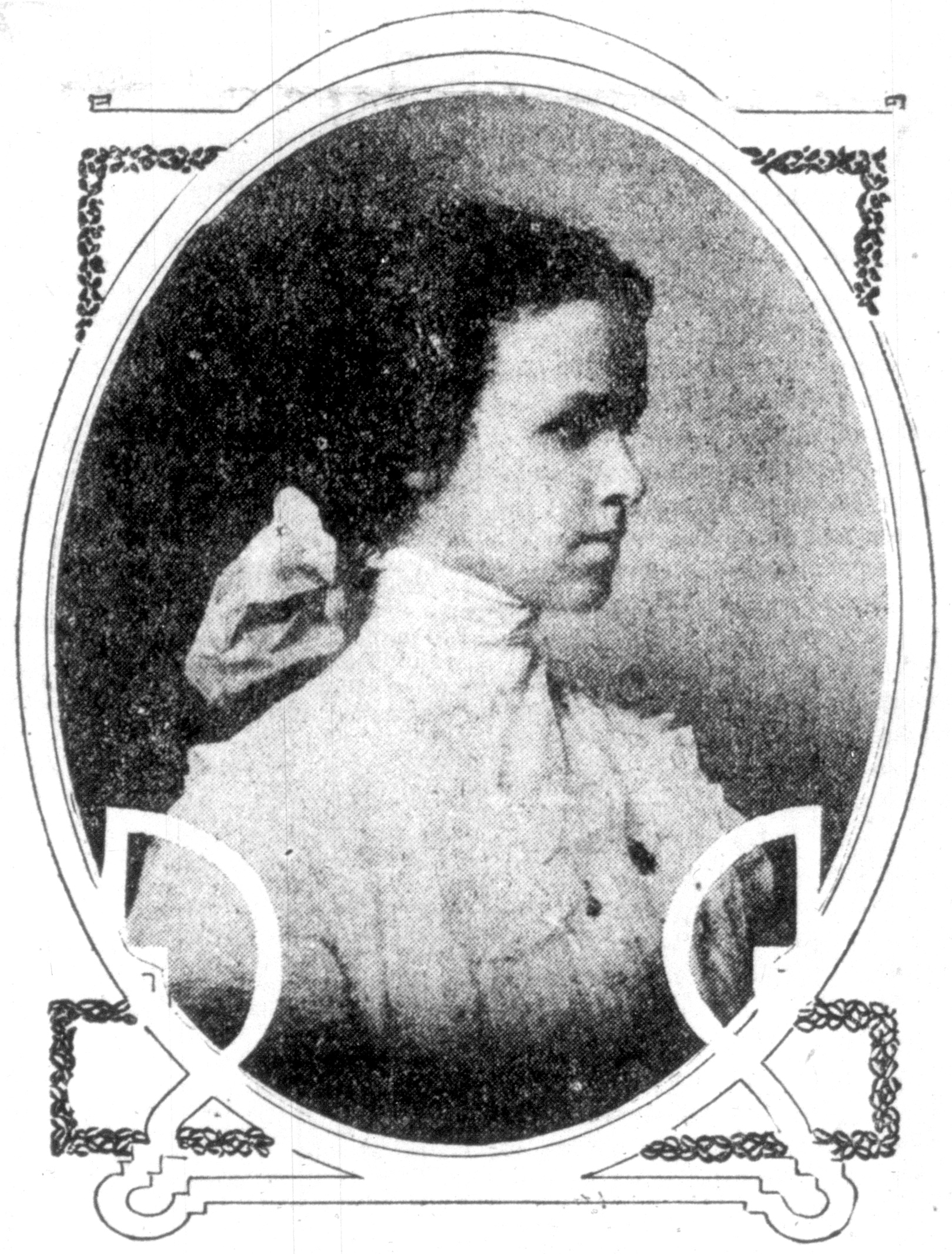
- Individual champion Marie Bolden
- Date: June 29, 1908
- Location: Hippodrome Theater, Cleveland, Ohio
- Winner: Cleveland (team); Marie C. Bolden (individual)
- Sponsor: National Education Association
- No. of contestants: 60
- Pronouncer: Solomon Henry Clark

The 1908 National Education Association Spelling Bee was a team-based, inter-city spelling bee held on June 29, 1908, at the Hippodrome Theater in Cleveland, Ohio. Predating the 1st Scripps National Spelling Bee in 1925 by seventeen years, this 1908 competition was the first national spelling bee in the United States. Cleveland won the team competition, and Marie C. Bolden was the individual champion.

== Competition ==
The spelling bee was part of the forty-sixth annual convention of the National Education Association (NEA), which was held in Cleveland. The NEA invited teams to compete from across the United States and promoted the competition as the first national spelling bee. Six thousand people, including convention speaker Booker T. Washington, attended the event at the Hippodrome.

Unlike the later Scripps National Spelling Bee competitions, the 1908 NEA Spelling Bee was an inter-city contest, with teams of fifteen eighth-graders each participating from Cleveland; Erie, Pennsylvania; Pittsburgh; and New Orleans. For the competition, each student took a written spelling test of one hundred words, and then spelled four words aloud on stage. The total number of spelling mistakes in both the written and verbal competitions determined the winning team.

The Cleveland team won the competition with the fewest errors, followed by Pittsburgh in second place, New Orleans in third place, and Erie, Pennsylvania in fourth. Marie C. Bolden, a thirteen-year-old black girl whose father was a mail carrier, was the only Cleveland speller with no errors, so she was named the individual champion and received a gold medal.

== Controversy ==
Even before the competition, some members of the all-white New Orleans team "...balked at the idea of spelling against a negro girl..." in a racially integrated team such as Cleveland's. After Marie Bolden and the Cleveland team won the competition, New Orleans school superintendent Warren Easton apologized to the people of New Orleans, promised that New Orleans students would not participate in any other contests in Northern states, and was censured by the New Orleans school board for allowing white students to compete against a black speller.

Also in New Orleans, after Marie Bolden's victory, the local black YMCA organized a spelling bee to be held in her honor. However, under pressure from mayor Martin Behrman due to high tensions "over race questions", the event was canceled.

In the written portion of the competition, pronouncer Solomon Henry Clark gave an incorrect example for the word "capitol", causing many spellers to write it as "capital". After the second-place Pittsburgh team and others raised concerns, the spelling bee organizers re-scored the written tests. After re-scoring, the teams kept their overall rankings, but Marie Bolden no longer had a perfect score, and two other girls on the Cleveland team did. Marie Bolden was still allowed to keep her gold medal and title as champion.
