= Sara M. Gonzalez =

American politician

Member of the New York City Council from the 38th district
- In office November 2002 – December 31, 2013
- Preceded by: Angel Rodriguez
- Succeeded by: Carlos Menchaca

Personal details
- Party: Democratic
- Education: Staten Island College; Columbia Business School
- Website: Official website

Sara M. Gonzalez is a former member of the New York City Council, representing District 38 which comprises Sunset Park, Boerum Hill, Red Hook, Windsor Terrace, among other neighborhoods within the borough of Brooklyn. In 2013, Gonzalez was defeated for re-election in the Democratic primary by Carlos Menchaca; she left office on December 31, 2013.

In November 2002, Gonzalez was chosen in a special election to fill a seat vacated by former City Councilman Angel Rodriguez, who was forced to resign after pleading guilty to charges of bribery and extortion.

While in office, she was the chairwoman of the Juvenile Justice Committee on the Council. Gonzalez was formerly the chairwoman of Brooklyn Community Board 7 in Sunset Park, in addition to being the executive director of Hispanic Young People's Alternatives, which was a non-profit organization that offered after-school and tutorial programs to Hispanic youths.

Gonzalez is an alumna of College of Staten Island, and has attended Columbia School of Business Management.

Political offices
Preceded by Angel Rodriguez	New York City Council, 38th district 2002–2014	Succeeded by Carlos Menchaca
