= Edmonton Journal =

Canadian daily newspaper

- Type: Daily newspaper
- Format: Broadsheet
- Owner: Postmedia Network
- Editor-in-chief: Dave Breakenridge
- Founded: 1903
- Language: English
- Headquarters: 10006 101 Street; Edmonton, Alberta; T5J 0S1
- Circulation: 91,776 weekdays 96,372 Saturdays (as of 2015)
- Sister newspapers: Calgary Herald
- ISSN: 0839-296X
- Website: edmontonjournal.com

The Edmonton Journal is a newspaper published in Edmonton, Alberta, Canada. It is part of the Postmedia Network. It comes out Monday to Saturday, with a print edition printed Tuesday to Saturday.

== History ==
Three Edmonton businessmen - John Macpherson, Arthur Moore and J.W. Cunningham - founded The Journal in 1903 as a rival to Alberta's first newspaper, the 23-year-old Liberal-Party-friendly Edmonton Bulletin. Within a week, the Journal took over another newspaper, The Edmonton Post, and established an editorial policy supporting the Conservative Party against the Bulletin's stance for the Liberal Party. In 1912, the Journal was sold to the Southam family. It remained under Southam ownership until 1996, when it was acquired by Hollinger International. The Journal was subsequently sold to Canwest in 2000, and finally came under its current ownership, Postmedia Network Inc., in 2010.

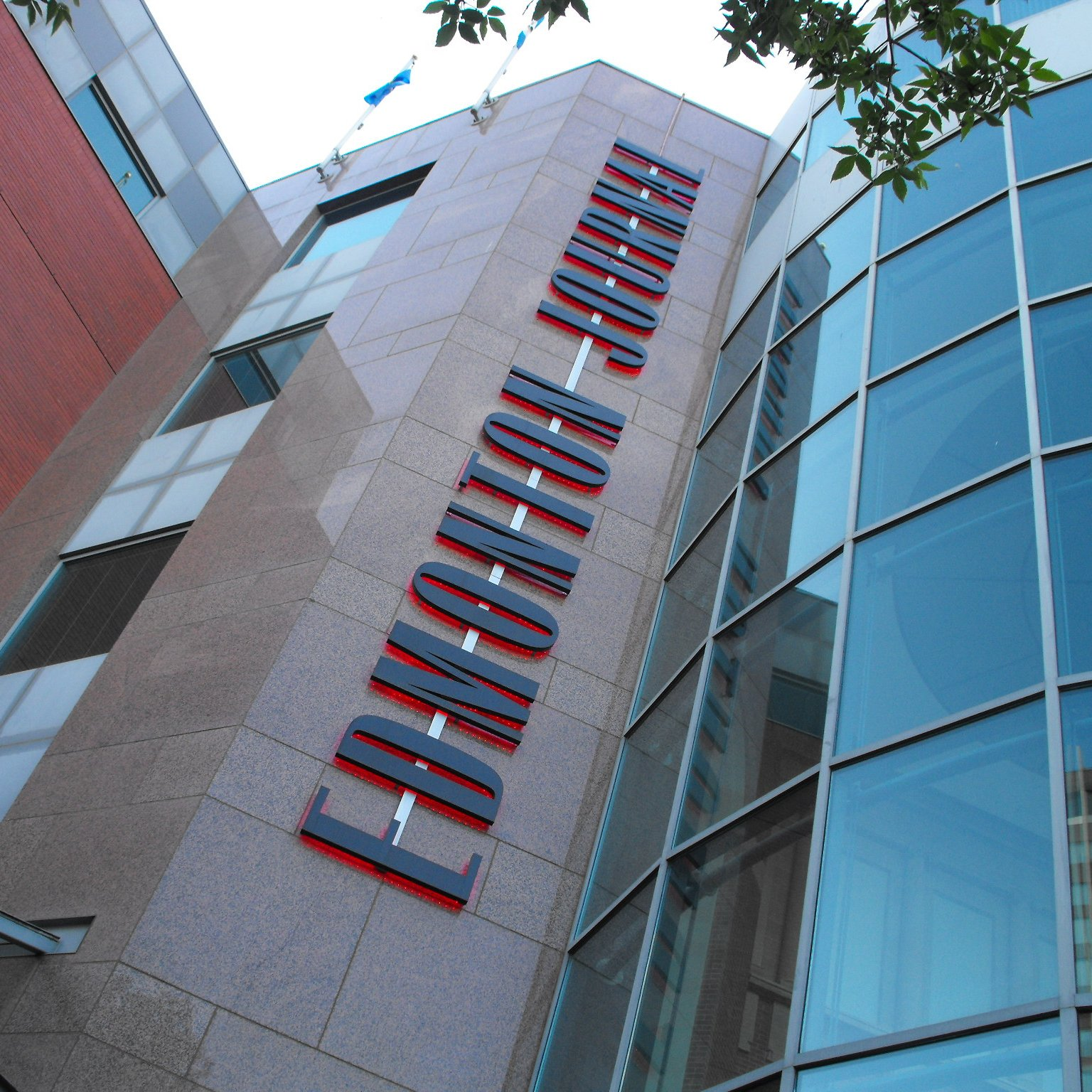
Edmonton Journal building

In 1905, The Journal began operating from a building on the corner of 102nd Avenue and 101st Street. Its present location at 101st Street and 100th Avenue was established in 1921, and Alberta's first radio station, CJCA, began broadcasting from the building a year later.

In 1937, the Journal engaged in constant criticism of the government of William Aberhart and it opposed the government's passage of the Accurate News and Information Act, which, if made into law, would have required newspapers to print government rebuttals to stories the provincial cabinet deemed "inaccurate". After successfully fighting the law, the Journal became the first non-American newspaper to be honoured by the Pulitzer Prize committee, receiving a special bronze plaque in 1938 for defending the freedom of the press.

For 19 months, from May 1946 and early 1948, the Edmonton Journal and The Bulletin were published as one newspaper due to a printers' strike.

On January 2, 1948, The Journal resumed a separate existence, and it never did settle with the striking members of the International Typographical Union.

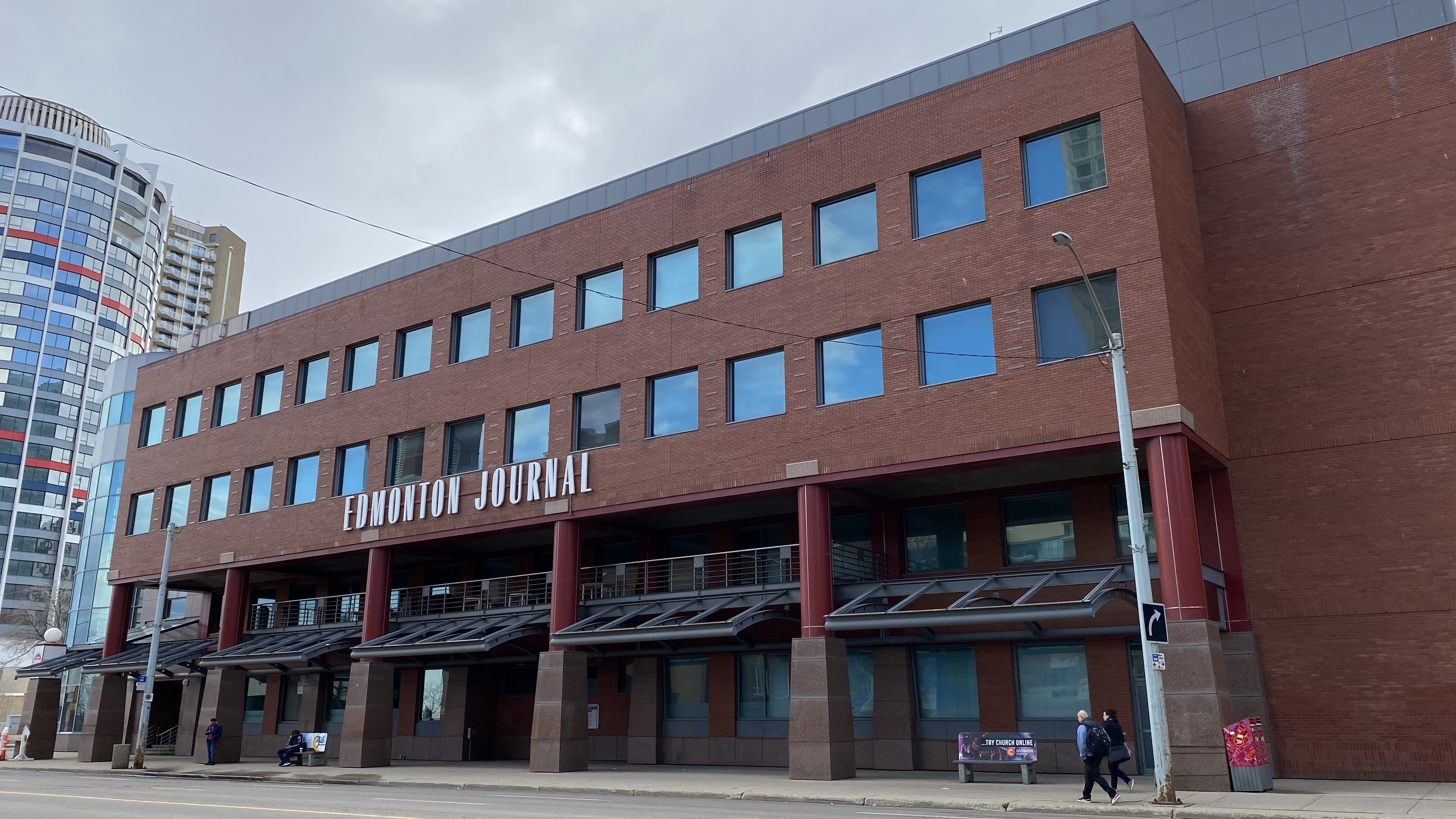
Edmonton Journal Building (2023)

After the Bulletin folded in 1951, the Journal was for a time Edmonton's only daily newspaper. The monopoly ended when the Edmonton Sun began publishing in 1978. Around 2020, the Journal ceased being a daily newspaper when it stopped publishing Sunday issues.

In 1982, government officials under the Combines Investigation Act entered and searched the paper's offices under the suspicion that Southam Newspapers was violating federal legislation by engaging in unfair trading and anti-competitive business practices. The Alberta Court of Appeal ruled the search to be inconsistent with the Charter of Rights and Freedoms, a decision the Supreme Court of Canada upheld in Hunter v Southam Inc.

== Present day ==
Today, the Journal publishes six days a week (the Monday edition being an e-version). Regular sections include News (city, Canada, and world), Sports, Opinion, A&E, Life, and Business. The newspaper participated in the Critics and Awards Program for High School Students (Cappies), now called the Alberta Youth Theatre Collective, and has partnerships with a number of arts organizations in Edmonton, including the Edmonton Symphony Orchestra and the Alberta Ballet Company. It also supports community events such as the Canspell National Spelling Bee.

The Journal also operates under a commitment to digital media in addition to traditional print.

In 2014, Postmedia Network, the owner of the Edmonton Journal, purchased several newspapers and websites from Quebecor. This made it that both the Edmonton Journal and its competitor, the Edmonton Sun were both owned by Postmedia. In 2016 it was announced that the Journal and Sun's newsrooms and operations would be merged while both newspapers would continue to be published. This also led to the cuts of many staff between the two papers.

== Circulation ==
The Edmonton Journal has suffered a decline in circulation, like most Canadian daily newspapers. Its total circulation dropped by 22 percent to 92,542 copies daily from 2009 to 2015.

Daily average

== See also ==
- List of newspapers in Canada
