= RHB-The Straits Times National Spelling Championship =

Spelling bee in Singapore

The RHB-The Straits Times Spelling Championship, informally known as the Big Spell, is a spelling bee held annually in Singapore open to Primary 4, 5 and 6 students. It is organized by The Straits Times and RHB Bank, in partnership with the Ministry of Education. In different years, it has also been supported by various organisations, companies, and institutions such as the National Library Board, HP, and ITE College Central. Its highest turnout was of approximately 1800 students in 2016's preliminary round. It was first held in 2012 and last held in 2017.

== Championships ==
=== Big Spell 2013 ===
The 2013 competition was held from March 9, 2013 to April 27, 2013 at the Raffles City Convention Centre. Round one of the Big Spell was held on March 9, 2013. An estimated 1,400 children from 120 schools in Singapore were registered for the first round of the Big Spell. The contestants took a vocabulary test, in which their answers were to be written on answer scripts. The duration of the test was an hour, and participants were given fifty words to complete. Out of the 1,400 children, some eighty of them were short listed for the zonal round, where the final thirty would be selected through the results. The Grand Finals of the Big Spell commenced on April 27, 2013. There were thirty finalists in total. In all, ten rounds were played that day. Ashvin Sivakumar of Anglo-Chinese School (Primary), the eventual winner, was described as a "standout at the microphone", with his looming height and inquisitiveness. As the victor, Sivakumar received $5,000 in cash and a school trophy. The runners-up, Kua Le Yi and Loi So Xian, were awarded $3,000 and $1,000 respectively. Footage of the elimination rounds and Grand Finals were broadcast on RazorTV.

== List of winners ==
Year	Winner	Winning word	School
2012	Jordan Foo Bao Luo	Jodhpurs	Anglo-Chinese School (Primary)
2013	Ashvin Sivakumar	Pulchritudinous	Anglo-Chinese School (Primary)
2014	Nicole Lim	Glockenspiel	Singapore Chinese Girls' School (Primary)
2015	Justinian Guan	Zeitgeist	Rosyth School
2016	Sophi Tan Xuan	Intelligentsia	Raffles Girls' Primary School
2017	Eashaa Pillai	Braggadocio	Raffles Girls' Primary School
