= Angel Rodriguez (politician) =

American politician convicted of corruption

Angel Rodriguez (born circa 1967) was a Democratic New York City Councilman representing District 38 in Brooklyn (which includes Sunset Park, Red Hook, and South Park Slope).

In 2002, he was arrested on corruption charges. He was sentenced in June 2003 to 52 months in prison and to pay $18,000 in restitution and fined $25,000. He had pled guilty in 2002 to federal bribery charges.

Rodriguez lives in Sunset Park with his wife and children. A graduate of the College of Staten Island, he was an accountant. He is unable to return to accounting as he has lost his license.

He was born and raised in Brooklyn but his mother is from Lares, Puerto Rico.

Political offices
Preceded by Joan Griffin McCabe	New York City Council, 38th district 1998–2002	Succeeded by Sara M. Gonzalez
