= Canspell National Spelling Bee =

Annual spelling bee in Canada (2005–2012)

The Canwest Canspell National Spelling Bee, later called the Postmedia Canspell National Spelling Bee, was a spelling bee held annually in Canada from 2005 to 2012. The bee was affiliated with the United States-based Scripps National Spelling Bee and used similar rules and word lists, adapted to suit Canadian usage and spelling. It was organized by Canwest Global Communications, parent company of nine of the regional sponsors, from 2005 to 2010 and by the Postmedia Network from 2010 to 2012 after Canwest's bankruptcy. The spelling bee ended in 2012.

== Competition ==
As of 2011, regional finals are held in 21 Canadian cities from Victoria to St. John's.

The winner in each of the regional finals participated in the national final in Ottawa each April from 2005 to 2010. From 2005 to 2009, the regional winners also qualified for the Scripps National Spelling Bee in Washington, D.C., whether they won the nationals or not. In 2010, because of the economic downturn and Canwest's bankruptcy, only the winner of the nationals participated in the SNSB. From 2011 onwards, the top three spellers, including the national champion, will compete in the SNSB.

The name of the competition was changed subtly in 2009 from "CanWest CanSpell" to "Canwest Canspell", in line with Canwest's elimination of camel case spelling from its corporate brand.

In late 2010, the competition was renamed the Postmedia Canspell Spelling Bee as a result of Canwest's bankruptcy in October 2009, where Canwest's assets were sold to Shaw Communications and the Postmedia Network.

== Media and the Bee ==
When Canwest sponsored the bee, it enjoyed significant coverage from Canwest-owned media outlets. A documentary on the event was produced in 2005, a live broadcast was aired in 2007, and edited versions of the finals were broadcast in 2006 and 2008. These broadcasts were all aired on the Global Television Network. Live webcasts are also featured each year. In 2011, CBC became the new broadcast partner and created a special one-hour primetime feature on the Canadian final called "Spelling Night in Canada". It usually takes place in the last week of March.

All Postmedia daily newspapers participate in the spelling bee, with the exception of The Province in Vancouver, as the company also owns the sponsoring Vancouver Sun. Postmedia's National Post, based in the Toronto area, serves as sponsor for that market. Uniquely, the Hamilton competition was co-sponsored by the National Post and a Canwest-owned TV station, CHCH-TV, and not a local paper such as The Hamilton Spectator. Hamilton does not have a local sponsor beyond 2009, after which CHCH was sold from Canwest to Channel Zero Inc. Hamilton spellers compete at the Toronto National Post spelling bee.

Other newspaper sponsors include the Winnipeg Free Press, The Telegram in St. John's, The Chronicle Herald in Halifax, The Chronicle-Journal in Thunder Bay, and The Guardian in Charlottetown and The Daily News in Kamloops, British Columbia.

The Saturn brand of General Motors was the presenting sponsor for 2005 and 2006. Saturn withdrew in 2007 and was replaced by Canada Post. Other national sponsors have included Air Canada, AIC Limited, Oxford University Press, the Canadian Museum of Civilization, the Lord Elgin Hotel, the Egg Farmers of Canada, and the Canadian Broadcasting Corporation (CBC).

== Competition statistics ==
=== National champions ===
Year	Champion	Scripps Placement	Notes
2005	Finola Hackett	11th place (tied)	Canada makes its first appearance in the SNSB
2006	Finola Hackett	2nd place	Hackett was the first Canadian to reach the "spell-off" final rounds and was tripped up by 'weltschmerz'.
2007	Soohyun Park	16th place (tied)	All 41 national finalists were invited to the SNSB.; Park advanced to the semis, but misspelled 'croquette.'; The three Canadian spellers remaining, Cody Wang, Anqi Dong and Nate Gartke, advanced to the final round.; Gartke finished as the runner-up after misspelling 'coryza.'
2008	Emma Brownlie	46th place (tied)	Did not advance to round 4
2009	Laura Newcombe	17th place (tied)	Newcombe advanced to the semis and was eliminated in round 5
2010	Laura Newcombe	5th place (tied)	Due to the recession, only the winner of the CNSB would represent Canada at the SNSB.; Newcombe advanced to the final round, but was eliminated at the beginning of round 7 by misspelling 'confiserie.'
2011	Laura Newcombe	2nd place	The top three finalists of the CNSB would represent Canada at the SNSB.; Newcombe, in her third and final year at the SNSB, became the third Canadian to finish as the runner-up by misspelling 'sorites.'; Veronica Penny also made the finals, tying for 6th place, by misspelling 'rougeot.'
2012	Jennifer Mong	10th place (tied)	Same as last year, the top three finalists of the CNSB would represent Canada at the SNSB.; Mong advanced to the semis, but was eliminated in round 6 by misspelling 'vellon.'; Mignon Tsai also made the semis and was eliminated in round 5 by misspelling 'macropodid', finishing in a tie for 22nd place.

=== Runners-up ===
Year	Person
2005	Edwin Ho
2006	Jennifer Hurd
2007	Amrit Sampalli
2008	Cody Wang
2009	Anna Lawrence
2010	Scott Xiao
2011	Veronica Penny
2012	Mignon Tsai

=== Winning words and word runner-up misspelled ===
Year	Winning Word	Runner-up Misspelled Word
2005	otiosity	brucellosis
2006	dghaisa	sacaton
2007	hypobulia	moiety
2008	hamadryad	Croesus
2009	heresimach	rechabite
2010	lidar	nomancy
2011	mycetophagous	hordeolum
2012	vindaloo	zanzibari

== Staff ==
Jacques Bailly, the long-time pronouncer for the American Scripps National Spelling Bee, also was the pronouncer for the Canadian Canspell Bee.
