= Veronica Penny =

Canadian Spelling Bee Regional Champion

Veronica Penny is a Canadian Spelling Bee Regional Champion who has competed in spelling bees on the Regional level, the Provincial Level, the National Level, and in the Scripps National Spelling Bee. In 2009, at age 10, Penny placed 25th, and in 2010, she placed 17th. In 2011, she reached the Finals, placing 6th in the Scripps National Spelling Bee. Penny has a record of 10 Regional Spelling Bee titles. From 2008 to 2010, Veronica won 5 Hamilton Regional bees. In 2011 and 2012, Veronica won 5 Regional Championships in Ottawa. Veronica became Ontario Provincial Champion in 2010, representing Hamilton, Ontario. She won the Provincial Championship the next year in 2011, representing Ottawa in the Spelling Bee of Canada. Penny was the Spelling Bee of Canada Intermediate champion for 2013.

Penny was a media darling at the 2008 and 2009 Scripps National Spelling Bees for her unique style when spelling her words. During the live broadcasts of the spelling bee, Penny became known for covering her face to think just before spelling a word. Images of Penny appeared on the Internet and were published in major newspapers from New York to the West Coast. In 2008, at 10 years old, Veronica reached the semifinals at the Scripps National Spelling Bee and placed 4th at Canspell, misspelling ophiomorphic. In 2009, at age 11, she placed 17th in the Scripps National Spelling Bee. Penny is known for putting a penny in her shoe for good luck and sleeping with a dictionary under her pillow. In 2011, Veronica was runner up in the Canwest Canspell spelling bee.

Veronica Penny was recognized at the Ontario Parliament during session by Member of Parliament Ontario Liberal Party Grant Crack. She has appeared in a spell-off on CTV Morning Live with hosts Lianne Laing, Kurt Stoodley, and Jeff Hopper.
