= James F. Brennan =

American politician

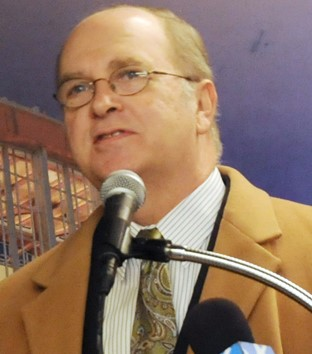

Member of the New York State Assembly from the 44th district
- In office January 1, 1985 – December 31, 2016
- Preceded by: Joseph Ferris
- Succeeded by: Robert Carroll

Personal details
- Born: April 17, 1952 (age 74) Brooklyn, New York, U.S.
- Party: Democratic

James F. Brennan (born April 17, 1952) is an American politician. He is a former Democratic member of the New York State Assembly, representing the 44th Assembly District (Brooklyn).

== Biography ==
Brennan was elected to the Assembly in 1984, from the 51st Assembly District, which included the neighborhoods of Park Slope and Sunset Park. In 1992, due to redistricting, Brennan's district radically changed. He subsequently ran and defeated fellow incumbent Joni Yoswein in the new 44th Assembly District, which includes the neighborhoods of Flatbush, Kensington, Park Slope and Windsor Terrace.

He chaired four committees during his career: six years as Chair of the Assembly Standing Committee on Mental Health and Developmental Disabilities, one year as Chair of the Assembly Committee on Oversight, Analysis, and Investigation, and Chair of the Assembly Committee on Cities. He most recently was the Chair of the Committee on Corporations, Authorities and Commissions.

Brennan has won three national awards as a State legislator. The first, in 1996, was given by the National Alliance for the Mentally Ill for Brennan's leadership in the fight for parity in mental and physical health benefits. The second was given by the National Conference of State Legislators in 2007, for an investigative report directed by Brennan as Chair of the Committee on Investigation. The report concerned how the Pataki administration undermined services for the severely disabled as a result of the closure of a Medicaid office serving those clients in the fall of 2004.

In 1998 and 1999, Brennan helped win funding for 5,000 new units of housing for the mentally ill in New York State. As Chair of the Cities Committee, Brennan authored two new laws in 2007, to improve public health and safety in construction and development in New York City—one cracking down on the filing of fraudulent building plans to the New York City Department of Buildings, and the other compelling the acquisition of insurance for excavations that might damage adjacent properties.

Brennan also helped create the Restore New York program, a statewide effort to help distressed areas in cities by having the State pay to clear abandoned or vacant residential or commercial property with $300 million in funding.

Brennan also authored the Expansion of the Real Property Partial Tax Exemption to low and moderate-income senior citizens in co-ops and condos.

He is an attorney, a graduate of Yale University and Brooklyn Law School.

New York State Assembly
Preceded by Joseph Ferris	New York State Assembly; 51st District; 1985–1992	Succeeded by Javier A. Nieves
Preceded by Joni A. Yoswein	New York State Assembly; 44th District; 1993–2016	Succeeded by Robert Carroll
