= Joan McCabe =

American politician

Member of New York City Council for District 38
- In office January 1, 1992 – December 31, 1997
- Preceded by: district established
- Succeeded by: Angel Rodriguez

Personal details
- Political party: Democratic Party

Joan Griffin McCabe was a Democratic Party member of New York City Council. She represented District 38 in Brooklyn from 1992 to 1997.
