= Chinese Characters Dictation Competition =

Spelling bee-like TV show in China

- 中国汉字听写大会; Zhōngguó hànzì tīngxiě dàhuì
- Directed by: Zheng Wen Guan (关正文)
- Country of origin: China
- Original language: Chinese
- No. of seasons: 2
- No. of episodes: 30 (incl. unaired)

Production
- Production company: China Central Television

Original release
- Network: CCTV-1
- Release: 2 August 2013 – present

Chinese Characters Dictation Competition (Chinese: 中国汉字听写大会; pinyin: Zhōngguó hànzì tīngxiě dàhuì) is a weekly television program where contestants write Chinese characters after hearing the words. The show now broadcasts on CCTV-1.

The show was inspired by spelling bees in the United States.

== List of champions ==
Year	Competition-ending word	Winner	Notes
2013	婉娈 (wǎnluán, a classical word which means "graceful")	Lu Jialei (陆佳蕾)	
2014	皤腹 (pófù, a classical word which means "big belly")	Chen Keyu (陈柯羽)	
2015	累茵 (lèiyīn, a classical word which means "multi-layered mattress")	Xu Weiqi (徐玮琦)	
