= Spelling Bee of Canada =

- Genre: Spelling bee
- Frequency: Annual
- Country: Canada
- Years active: 1987–present
- Website: https://www.spellingbeeofcanada.ca/

Spelling Bee of Canada is a charitable, educational spelling bee organization founded by Julie Spence in the Greater Toronto Area in 1987. As of 2022, over 70,000 children have participated in the competition.

The SBOC holds an annual spelling competition for children 6–14 years of age. Participants are divided into three age categories: primary, 6–8; junior, 9–11; and intermediate, 12–14. 15+ students will become mentors to participants in their region.

Though SBOC operates primarily in Ontario, contestants from other provinces are allowed to register and have competed in the past.

Julie Spence founded SBOC in order to engage parents and children. Spelling bees were popular in Jamaica where she grew up, and she recalls realizing during the competitions "how much [it] brought people together". She is happy with the growth of SBOC but disappointed by the extremely low number of black participants, and she has encountered many black parents who do not want their children to compete. Veronica Taylor, a Barbadian-born mental health counsellor and the president of SBOC's Hamilton chapter, is also concerned about the lack of black participation, saying that black parents are not encouraging their children but letting them decide if they want to compete. Laurel Broten, Ontario's Minister of Education, praised the SBOC for helping children in the primary, junior and intermediate age ranges improve their vocabulary and public speaking.

== Competitions ==
The 2014 SBOC finals took place on 11 May 2014 at the Eaton Chelsea in Toronto. The regional competition in April 2014 had 3,000 participants, 84 of whom went on to the finals. The championship title comes with over $10,000 in cash prizes. This year's competition also marks the opening of three new regional chapters; the Aga Khan Education Board, Khalsa School of British Columbia, and the Toronto Community Housing chapter.

Rogers TV Spelling Bee of Canada 28th Championship had its finals on Sunday May 3, 2015 at The Ismaili Centre - Social Hall, 49 Wynford Dr., Toronto. 91 contestants competed in the finals. New additions to this year's regional competitions include; Toronto Bayview and Sheppard's YMCA, British Columbia's IWE Learning Centre and the Cultural Youth Initiative in Edmonton.

Rogers TV Spelling Bee of Canada 29th Championship finals were held on Sunday May 15, 2016 at the Ismaili Centre again. 93 participants from the 31 regional competitions competed in this year's finals. New additions to this year's regional competitions include a First Nation's chapter from Saskatchewan, and a new chapter from British Columbia – showing the increasing interest in the spelling bee.

For the first time, due to the Covid-19 Pandemic in 2020, the regional finals, as well as the National Championships, were held in virtual Zoom meetings, and the National Finals were on a livestream on November 29, 2020. This stream was livestreamed on CBC Sports, as well as a feature on CBC Gem, and is available on Spelling Bee of Canada's YouTube channel as of December 2020. This same procedure was taken for the 2021 Bee livestream.

Since 2020, the Chapter Spelling Bees have been transitioned to Regional/District Spelling Bees virtually. The first-place winner from the Regional Spelling Bee Competitions competes at the National Championships.

The 35th Annual Championships will be returning back in person for the first time since 2019 before the pandemic. The national spelling bee will be live-streamed on CBC Sports and hosted at the Beeton Hall at the Toronto Reference Library on Sunday, June 12, 2022.

== List of Winners ==
Year	Category	1st place	2nd place	3rd place	Ref(s).
2004	Junior	Varjitt Jeeva	Keerthana Ravigulan	Samuel Heersink	
2004	Senior	Dhivian Premakumar	Jeffrey Baer	Kiruthiha Vimalakanthan	
2005	Junior	Gazal Grewal	Charlie Gray	Katie Martin	
2005	Senior	Jeffrey Baer	Kiruthiha Vimalakanthan	David Sheps	
2006	Junior	Katie Martin	Jill O'Craven	Kim Tran Nguyen	
2006	Senior	Leslie Newcombe	Angus Benderavage	Sarah Bowers	
2007	Primary	David Chan	Laura Newcombe	Veronica Penny	
2007	Junior	Katie Martin	Zuhaer Anzum	Maleika Jeewanjee	
2007	Intermediate	Umayangga Yogalingam	Donald Bowins	Merany Ganesan	
2008	Junior	Lisa Jefferies	Lauren Park	unknown	
2008	Intermediate	Caitlin McLaren	Alexander Newcombe	Jessica Zung	
2009	Primary	Zakhar Husak	Zhongtian (Niuniu) Wang	Neharika Nair	
2009	Junior	Daniela Kistemaker	Janahan Selvanayagam	Veronica Penny	
2009	Intermediate	Jessica Zung	Alexander Newcombe	Ibrahim Tahir	
2010	Primary	Zachary Betts	Ruthanne Parkes	unknown	"Local Bee Champs". The Hamilton Spectator. June 16, 2010. p. 61.
2010	Junior	Veronica Penny	Anna Lawrence	Laura Newcombe	
2010	Intermediate	Ibrahim Tahir	Alexander Newcombe	Maya Amoah	
2011	Primary	Maya Sen Chawla	Purva Vyas	Daniel Del Rosso	
2011	Junior	Umaiyahl Nageswaran	unknown	unknown	
2011	Intermediate	Veronica Penny	Emma McLaren	Laura Newcombe	
2012	Primary	unknown	unknown	unknown	
2012	Junior	Victor Rong	Linnea Moras	Oswin Chang	
2012	Intermediate	David Chan	unknown	unknown	
2013	Primary	unknown	unknown	unknown	
2013	Junior	Nivetha	Alex Chan	Maya Sen Chawla	
2013	Intermediate	Veronica Penny	Umaiyahl Nageswaran	Kayley Ting	
2014	Primary	Evangeline Bodhuri	unknown	unknown	
2014	Junior	Akshay Thambipillai	Huzafa Hyde	unknown	
2014	Intermediate	Umaiyahl Nageswaran	Justin Borromeo	unknown	
2015	Primary	Prabhgun Suri	Stevon Anton	Sueventha Ketharan	
2015	Junior	Mehar Kaur Sahota	Areez Bhanji	Yousra Lakhani	
2015	Intermediate	Ganathyshan Chelliahpillai	Shulli Jones	Prableen Kaur Sandhu	
2016	Primary	Anushka Yoganathan	Victor Sarca	Kashyap Prasannaa	
2016	Junior	Prabhgun Suri	Mehar Kaur Sahota	Areez Bhanji	
2016	Intermediate	Daniel Song	Maya Sen Chawla	Huzafa Hyde	
2017	Primary	Karyssa Barrios-Giantses	Caylee Lee	McKenna Fineblanket	
2017	Junior	Raymond Ha	Sonia Rusin-Franke	Enya Hubers	
2017	Intermediate	Huzafa Hyde	Jake Lance	Praneet Sing Arora	
2018	Primary	Abinaya Rameshkumar	Bilal Kamram	Aryan Arnold	
2018	Junior	Akshayan Victor-Camilus	Julius Aarup Kulla	Thilaxy Jeyabavan	
2018	Intermediate	Praneet Arora	Rishi Damarla	Asmitha Rajah	
2019	Primary	Parnavdeep S. Kundi	Raya Mistry-Lad	Marco Joannou	
2019	Junior	Aiden Kwon	Erin Chaters	Muskan Jiwa	
2019	Intermediate	Rishi Damarla	Praneet Arora	Asmitha Rajah	
2020	Primary	Mark Raspopov	Atharv Awasthi	Keyan Fernando	
2020	Junior	Muskan Jiwa	Alice Fehr	Olive Reilly	
2020	Intermediate	Leena Jalees	Krishiv Shah	Serene Dydyna	
2021	Primary	Sarah Fehr	Riddhi Jha	Miriam Lagrandeur	
2021	Junior	Mark Raspopov	Ayo Adenlolu	Alice Fehr	
2021	Intermediate	Amshanaa Raviraj	Kavya Kariamal	Sofia Varma-Vitug	
2022	Primary	Anhad Singh	Natasha Thomas	Tanvi Kanekar	
2022	Junior	Kavya Senthil	Sophia Mathew	Austin He	
2022	Intermediate	Ryaan Khan	Rebha Badhan	Ali Usman	
2023	Primary	Ayaan Ahmad	Advi Rishi	William Gao	
2023	Junior	Alston Li	Eve Sandomierski	Temisan Johnson	
2023	Intermediate	Parnavdeep Singh Kundi	Olive Reilly	Ethan Lin	
