= New York's 44th State Assembly district =

American legislative district

Assemblymember
Robert Carroll; D–Park Slope

The 44th Assembly district of New York is one of the 150 districts in the New York State Assembly. It has been represented by Democrat Robert Carroll. Carroll was elected in 2016.

== Geography ==
=== 2020s ===
District 44 is in Brooklyn. It is made up by most of the neighborhoods of Windsor Terrace and South Slope, and portions of Park Slope, Prospect Heights, Kensington, Borough Park, Victorian Flatbush and Ditmas Park. Most of Prospect Park, including the Brooklyn Botanic Garden, is included in this district.

The district overlaps (partially) with New York's 7th, 9th and 10th congressional districts, the 17th, 20th, 21st, 22nd, 25th and 26th districts of the New York State Senate, and the 35th, 38th, 40th, 44th and 45th districts of the New York City Council.

=== 2010s ===
District 44 is in Brooklyn. It is made up by the neighborhoods of Park Slope, Windsor Terrace, Kensington, Borough Park, Victorian Flatbush, Ditmas Park and Midwood. Most of Prospect Park is included in this district.

== Recent election results ==
=== 2026 ===
2026 New York State Assembly election, District 44
Party	Candidate	Votes	%
Democratic	Robert Carroll		
Working Families	Robert Carroll		
Total	Robert Carroll (incumbent)		
Republican	Glenn Nocera		
Conservative	Glenn Nocera		
Total	Glenn Nocera		
Write-in			
Total votes			100.0

=== 2024 ===
2024 New York State Assembly election, District 44
Party	Candidate	Votes	%
Democratic	Robert Carroll	37,408	
Working Families	Robert Carroll	9,673	
Total	Robert Carroll (incumbent)	47,601	84.9
Republican	John Bennett	6,920	
Conservative	John Bennett	1,167	
Total	John Bennett	8,087	14.6
Write-in		284	0.5
Total votes		55,452	100.0
Democratic hold			

=== 2022 ===
2022 New York State Assembly election, District 44
Party	Candidate	Votes	%
Democratic	Robert Carroll	26,592	
Working Families	Robert Carroll	10,745	
Total	Robert Carroll (incumbent)	37,337	85.9
Republican	Brenda Horton	5,150	
Conservative	Brenda Horton	616	
Total	Brenda Horton	5,766	13.3
Medical Freedom	Arkadiusz Tomaszewski	269	0.6
Write-in		73	0.2
Total votes		43,445	100.0
Democratic hold			

=== 2020 ===
2020 New York State Assembly election, District 44
Party	Candidate	Votes	%
Democratic	Robert Carroll	27,790	
Working Families	Robert Carroll	9,667	
Total	Robert Carroll (incumbent)	37,457	79.1
Republican	Salvatore Berrera	8,674	
Conservative	Salvatore Berrera	1,130	
Total	Salvatore Berrera	9,804	20.7
Write-in		75	0.2
Total votes		47,336	100.0
Democratic hold			

=== 2018 ===
2018 New York State Assembly election, District 44
Party	Candidate	Votes	%
Democratic	Robert Carroll	24,980	
Working Families	Robert Carroll	4,922	
Total	Robert Carroll (incumbent)	29,902	85.8
Republican	Yevgeny Goldberg	4,155	
Conservative	Yevgeny Goldberg	665	
Reform	Yevgeny Goldberg	70	
Total	Yevgeny Goldberg	4,890	14.0
Write-in		50	0.2
Total votes		34,842	100.0
Democratic hold			

=== 2016 ===
2016 New York State Assembly election, District 44
Primary election
Party	Candidate	Votes	%
Democratic	Robert Carroll	6,031	89.3
Democratic	Rob Curry-Smithson	369	5.4
Democratic	Troy Odendhal	299	4.4
Write-in		75	0.9
Total votes		6,752	100.0
General election
Democratic	Robert Carroll	30,082	
Working Families	Robert Carroll	4,697	
Total	Robert Carroll	34,779	85.3
Republican	Glenn Nocera	4,736	
Conservative	Glenn Nocera	1,185	
Total	Glenn Nocera	5,921	14.5
Write-in		63	0.2
Total votes		40,763	100.0
Democratic hold			

=== 2014 ===
2014 New York State Assembly election, District 44
Party	Candidate	Votes	%
Democratic	James F. Brennan	10,704	
Working Families	James F. Brennan	4,473	
Total	James F. Brennan (incumbent)	15,177	84.5
Republican	Mike Yusupov	1,672	
Conservative	Mike Yusupov	956	
Total	Mike Yusupov	2,628	14.6
Write-in		155	0.9
Total votes		17,960	100.0
Democratic hold			

=== 2012 ===
2012 New York State Assembly election, District 44
Party	Candidate	Votes	%
Democratic	James F. Brennan	24,934	
Working Families	James F. Brennan	3,410	
Total	James F. Brennan (incumbent)	28,344	84.0
Republican	Catherine Fox	4,357	
Conservative	Catherine Fox	1,032	
Total	Catherine Fox	5,389	16.0
Write-in		26	0.0
Total votes		33,759	100.0
Democratic hold			

=== 2010 ===
2010 New York State Assembly election, District 44
Party	Candidate	Votes	%
Democratic	James F. Brennan (incumbent)	16,423	79.8
Republican	Alfred Caccamo	3,475	
Conservative	Alfred Caccamo	649	
Total	Alfred Caccamo	4,124	20.0
Write-in		32	0.2
Total votes		20,579	100.0
Democratic hold			

=== Federal results in Assembly District 44 ===
Year	Office	Results
2024	President	Harris 79.7 - 16.8%
2024	Senate	Gillibrand 83.7 - 14.8%
2022	Senate	Schumer 86.6 - 12.7%
2020	President	Biden 76.0 - 22.8%
2018	Senate	Gillibrand 85.3 - 14.5%
2016	President	Clinton 77.6 - 18.5%
2016	Senate	Schumer 84.4 - 11.6%
2012	President	Obama 75.8 - 22.3%
2012	Senate	Gillibrand 82.8 - 14.9%
