= Muslim Interscholastic Tournament =

The Muslim Interscholastic Tournament (MIST) is an annual three-day competition that takes place in multiple regions across the United States and Canada. Founded in 2002 in Houston, Texas, MIST brings together Muslim high school students to participate in a variety of academic, artistic, and athletic competitions. The event aims to promote personal development, foster community engagement, and encourage a deeper understanding of Islamic values among youth.

== Overview ==
MIST operates on two levels: regional tournaments and a national tournament. Regional competitions serve as qualifiers and are typically held over a single weekend or spread across two weekends, involving preliminary rounds and an awards ceremony. Top performers from regional events advance to the national tournament, which occurs over three consecutive days during the summer.

== History ==
Founded in 2002 by Shazia Siddiqi in Houston, Texas, MIST began as a local initiative to provide Muslim high school students with opportunities for intellectual and spiritual growth through competition and collaboration. Since its inception, the tournament has expanded significantly, now encompassing over 20 regions in North America. The organization is entirely volunteer-run and continues to grow in participation and scope each year.

== Competitions ==
MIST features a wide array of competitions categorized into knowledge, arts, writing and oratory, brackets, group projects, and sports. The competitions are designed to cater to diverse talents and interests, encouraging students to showcase their abilities in various fields.

Category I: Knowledge and Quran

- Knowledge Tests
- Quran Memorization

Category II: Arts

- 2D Art
- 3D Art
- Fashion Design
- Graphic Design
- Photography

Category III: Writing and Oratory

- Extemporaneous Essay
- Extemporaneous Speaking
- Original Oratory
- Poetry
- Prepared Essay
- Short Fiction
- Spoken Word

Category IV: Brackets

- Debate
- Math Olympics
- MIST Quiz Bowl
- Improv

Category V: Group Projects

- Business Venture
- Nasheed
- Humanitarian Service (formerly Community Service)
- Science Fair
- Short Film
- Social Media

Category VI: Sports

- Basketball

== Participation ==
=== Regions ===
Below is a list of regions that host their own regional tournaments and participate in the national tournament, listed alphabetically.

1. Atlanta
2. Chicago
3. Dallas
4. Detroit
5. Houston
6. Nashville
7. New Jersey
8. New York
9. Philadelphia
10. St. Louis
11. SoCal (Southern California)
12. Toronto
13. Washington D.C.

=== Notable participants ===
One of MIST's notable alumni is Noor Tagouri, a Libyan American journalist known for her work on documentaries such as "The Trouble They've Seen: The Forest Haven Story" and "Sold in America". Tagouri participated in MIST as a high school student and has since served as a keynote speaker at multiple MIST events, including MIST Chicago in 2016.

=== Demographics ===
As of 2007, MIST participants were predominantly of South Asian descent (60%), followed by Arab (20%), Black (17%), and other ethnicities (3%). In terms of religious affiliation, approximately 82% identified as Sunni Muslim, 15% as Shia Muslim, and 3% were non-Muslim.

== National Tournament ==
The top 5 competitors in a competition at a regional tournament qualifies for the National Tournament. National Tournaments take place in a different city each year.

- 2011: Atlanta
- 2012: Toronto
- 2013: Detroit
- 2014: Washington DC
- 2015: Houston
- 2016: Toronto
- 2017: Detroit
- 2018: New York
- 2019: Baltimore
- The 2020 National Tournament was slated to take place in Chicago; it was canceled due to the coronavirus pandemic.
- The 2021 National Tournament was conducted online.
- 2022: New Jersey
- 2023: North Carolina
- 2024: Atlanta
- 2025: Detroit
- 2026: St. Louis

== Preparation and Organization ==
Preparation for MIST begins in November when regional organizers plan events, secure venues, and recruit volunteers. High school students register in the winter and begin preparing for their selected competitions. Regional tournaments typically occur in late March or early April, while the national tournament takes place between July and August.
