= The Kamloops Daily News =

Former Canadian daily newspaper

- Type: Daily newspaper
- Format: Broadsheet
- Owner: Glacier Media
- Publisher: Tim Shoults
- Editor: Mel Rothenburger
- Founded: 1931, as Kamloops Shopper
- Ceased publication: January 11, 2014
- Language: English
- Headquarters: 393 Seymour Street, Kamloops, British Columbia, Canada
- Circulation: 12,000 daily

The Kamloops Daily News, also known as simply The Daily News was an award-winning local daily newspaper in Kamloops, British Columbia, Canada. It was owned by Glacier Media.

The paper was founded in 1931 as the Kamloops Shopper by George Duncan Brown. George Dawson and Watt Francis took the paper over in 1937 and called it the Kamloops Advertiser. In 1963 news items were included with paper's content. The paper's name was changed in 1965 to the North Kamloops News Advertiser. A year later it was changed to Kamloops News Advertiser. By 1968 the paper was published twice a week and three times a week two months later. The word "Advertiser" was dropped from the title in 1973. The paper was bought by Southam, Inc., in 1981 and began publishing Monday to Friday in 1982. By 1986 the paper was published six days a week and the name changed to The Kamloops Daily News. On Sept. 16, 1995, the paper went from being delivered in the afternoons to morning delivery.

Southam sold the paper to Hollinger Inc. in 1996. Along with several other small British Columbia dailies, The Kamloops Daily News was one of the last Canadian properties to be held by Hollinger Inc., the media conglomerate owned by Conrad Black. Hollinger sold its remaining Canadian holdings to Vancouver-based Glacier Ventures International, later called Glacier Media, in 2006.

Over the years, the Kamloops Daily News won numerous Canadian journalism awards, including Ma Murray Awards, Jack Webster Awards and Canadian Community Newspaper Awards.

On January 6, 2014, the Daily News announced its closure within 60 days, citing economic reasons.

== See also ==
- List of newspapers in Canada
