= Joni A. Yoswein =

American politician (born 1955)

Joni A. Yoswein (born 1955) is an American politician from New York.

== Life ==
She was born in 1955, the daughter of David J. Yoswein (died 1997). She graduated from SUNY Albany and married Glenn C. Van Bramer.

She began her political career as a Democrat, serving as an aide to Assemblyman Mel Miller for fourteen years. During Miller's service as a Speaker, she took the role as the Director of Operations of the Assembly. In addition, she was a delegate to both the 1984 and 1988 Democratic National Conventions.

On January 28, 1992, she was elected to the New York State Assembly (44th D.), to fill the vacancy caused by the conviction of Mel Miller for felony and remained as a member of the 189th New York State Legislature until the end of the year. In September 1992, after re-apportionment, she ran in the 44th District Democratic primary for re-nomination against James F. Brennan, the incumbent from the old 51st District, and was defeated. In November 1992, she ran on the Liberal ticket for re-election, but was defeated again by Brennan.

In 1993, she was an Assistant Commissioner of the New York City Department of Aging.

In 1994, she founded, and ever since has been President of, Yoswein New York, a public affairs consulting firm.

Assemblyman and Supreme Court Justice Leonard E. Yoswein (1920–2011) was her uncle.

New York State Assembly
Preceded by Mel Miller	New York State Assembly; 44th District; 1992	Succeeded by James F. Brennan
