= Félix W. Ortiz =

Puerto Rican politician

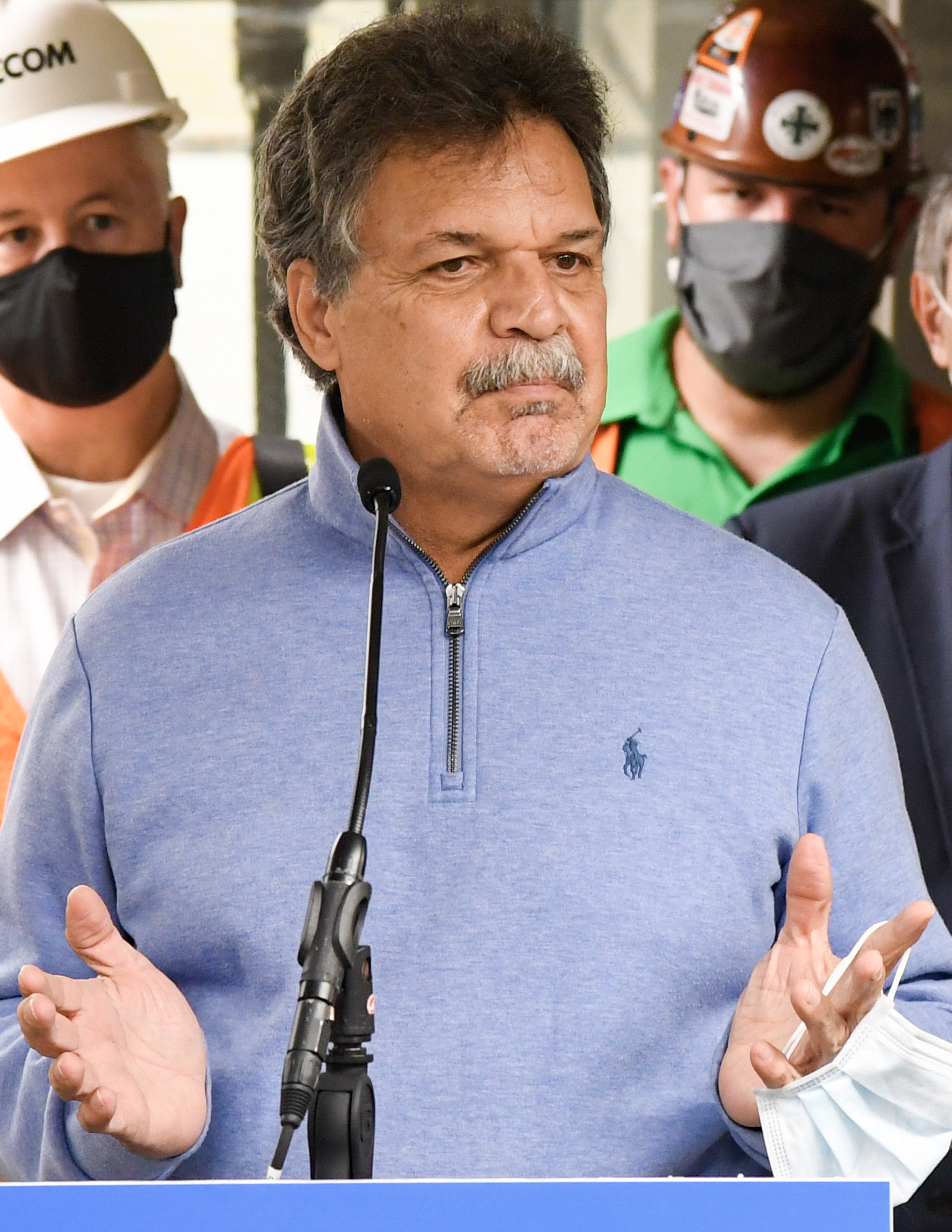

Assistant Speaker of the New York State Assembly
- In office February 9, 2015 – 2021

Member of the New York State Assembly from the 51st district
- In office January 1, 1995 – January 1, 2021
- Preceded by: Javier A. Nieves
- Succeeded by: Marcela Mitaynes

Personal details
- Born: November 2, 1959 (age 67) Salinas, Puerto Rico
- Party: Democratic
- Education: Boricua College (BS); New York University (MPA)
- Website: Official website

Military service
- Allegiance: United States of America
- Branch/service: United States Army
- Years of service: 1986–1988

Félix W. Ortiz (born November 2, 1959, in Puerto Rico) is an American politician, formerly representing New York's 51st Assembly District. He is a Democrat and served as Assistant Speaker of the New York State Assembly.

== Early life ==
Ortiz moved from Puerto Rico to New York City in 1980, becoming the first member of his family to move to the continental United States. He attended Boricua College, graduating in 1983 with a Bachelor of Science degree in business administration. He received a master's degree in public administration from New York University in 1986. Ortiz then joined the United States Army, serving from 1986 to 1988.

== Political career ==
Ortiz was first elected to the assembly in November 1994, defeating the incumbent Javier A. Nieves.

In 2000, Assemblyman Ortiz achieved passage of the nation's first law to ban the use of hand held cell phones while driving a motor vehicle. In 2001, he introduced a bill that would lower the drinking age to 18; he cited unfairness and difficulty with enforcement as his motivations.

In March 2010, Ortiz introduced a bill, co-sponsored with assembly members Margaret Markey and N. Nick Perry, that would prohibit the use of all forms of salt in the preparation and cooking of all restaurant food. Ortiz said he was inspired to introduce the bill after his father suffered a heart attack due to high blood pressure. The bill quickly gained media attention, and prompted negative comments from New York chefs such as Tom Colicchio, who said a salt ban would mean "no one would come here anymore," and New York City mayor Michael Bloomberg, who called the bill "ridiculous". The proposal also earned Ortiz the title of "Nanny of the Month" for March 2010 from Reason.tv. Responding to the outcry, Ortiz issued a statement saying that his intention was to have the bill only outlaw the use of salt "as an additive", not as "a functional component of the recipe".

Ortiz has supported various progressive public policies. He has passed legislation in areas of worker rights and safety, obesity prevention, banning the use of cell phones while driving and advocating for increases in organ donations.

Ortiz, who has worked with First Lady Michelle Obama on obesity prevention measures, also introduced legislation mandating that fast food restaurants post calories counts for food items on their menus. The calorie counts are now standard practice at fast food eateries.

Ortiz has served as chair of several committees and legislative task forces including Cities, Veterans Affairs, Mental Health, Alcohol and Drug Abuse, Food, Farm and Nutrition and the Legislature's Puerto Rican and Hispanic Task Force.

He has also served on the executive committee of the National Conference of State Legislatures (NCSL) and serves as co-chair of the NCSL Task Force on International Relations. He is the former chairman of the National Hispanic Caucus of State Legislators (NHCSL) and is a member of the Black, Puerto Rican, Hispanic and Asian Caucus. In February 2015 Assemblyman Ortiz was appointed Assistant Speaker of the New York State Assembly; he is the first Hispanic to hold the position.

Ortiz ran for the 38th district of the New York City Council in 2017, but lost in the primary to incumbent Carlos Menchaca.

On July 16, 2020, Ortiz conceded defeat against Democratic Socialist and political newcomer Marcela Mitaynes after absentee ballots from the June 23 Democratic primary had been counted. Once the votes were certified, Ortiz had lost by 280 votes in a 4-way primary.

New York State Assembly
Preceded by Javier A. Nieves	New York State Assembly, 51st District; 1995–2021	Succeeded by Marcela Mitaynes
