= Hippodrome Theater (Cleveland) =

Theatre in Cleveland, Ohio, United States

Coordinates: 41°29′56″N 81°41′15″W

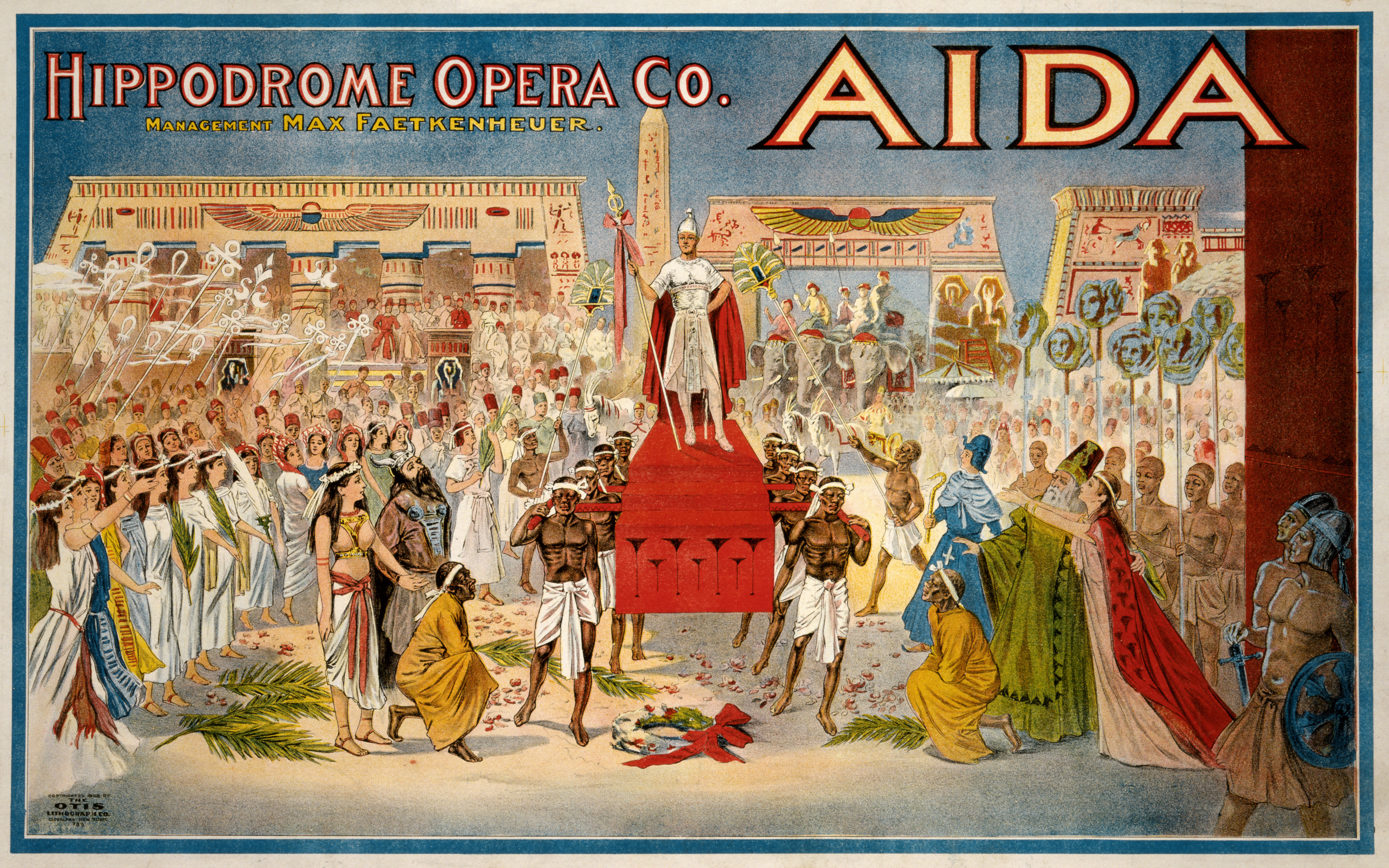
Poster from a 1908 production of Aida at the Hippodrome Theater

The Hippodrome Theater was located at 720 Euclid Ave in Cleveland, Ohio. In its day, it was a very lavish theater and ranked as one of the world's greatest playhouses.

== History of the Hippodrome ==
On December 31, 1907, the Hippodrome, also known as the "Hipp," opened as the world's second largest stage with seating for 3,548 people and two balconies. The stage of the Hippodrome could handle large productions and measured 130' wide, 104' deep, and 110' high. The “Hipp” was an eleven-story office building with a theater marquee and two entrances. The Hippodrome had many interesting features, such as a pool in front of the stage in the central area that would splash water on the orchestra as horses trotted past. There was also a backstage area that could be used for scenery staging or used as a dressing area that could dress up to 1500 actors. The genius behind this grand theater was architect John Eliot of Knox and Eliot and he modeled Cleveland’s Hippodrome after New York’s Hippodrome. Cleveland's Hippodrome was created to host plays, vaudeville shows, and opera performances. Famous early twentieth-century performers played at the Hippodrome: Enrico Caruso, Sarah Bernhardt, W. C. Fields, Will Rogers, Al Jolson, and John McCormack.

The Hippodrome did evolve over time to keep up with upcoming technology. In 1922, the Hippodrome began showing projected films. In 1931, there was a remodel that included expanded seating for more than 4,000 people, as well as air conditioning that used water from Lake Erie. The theater also became the largest American theater devoted completely to motion pictures in 1931. By 1933, the theater went bankrupt and Warner Bros took over operations of the theater. In 1951, the Hippodrome Theater became part of the Telenews chain and the property was purchased by Alvin Krenzler in 1972. By the 1970s, movie attendance began to decline.

The eleven-story office building had several tenants over its nearly 80-year history. At street level, there was Green Jewelers, a shoe store, and a haberdashery. Danny Vegh’s Billiards, Downtown Health Club, and Table Tennis Venter occupied the basement level from 1965 to 1980. By the late 1960s, there were a decline in visitors to the office spaces and it became difficult to keep tenants. By 1978, all but street level operations were closed. In 1979, there was a perceived community need for office space and a giant complex was proposed to occupy the "Hipp’s" site. This initiative to save the Hippodrome failed due to no new tenants signing rental agreements and due to a lack of financing. The Landmarks Commission was also approached to preserve the Hippodrome as an historic site. This effort to save the building failed because the building’s condition was deemed insufficient to repair. In 1981, the Hippodrome was demolished to create a parking lot. In 2023, the City Club Apartment replaced the surface lot that was on the site of the Hippodrome.
