= Marcela Mitaynes =

American politician

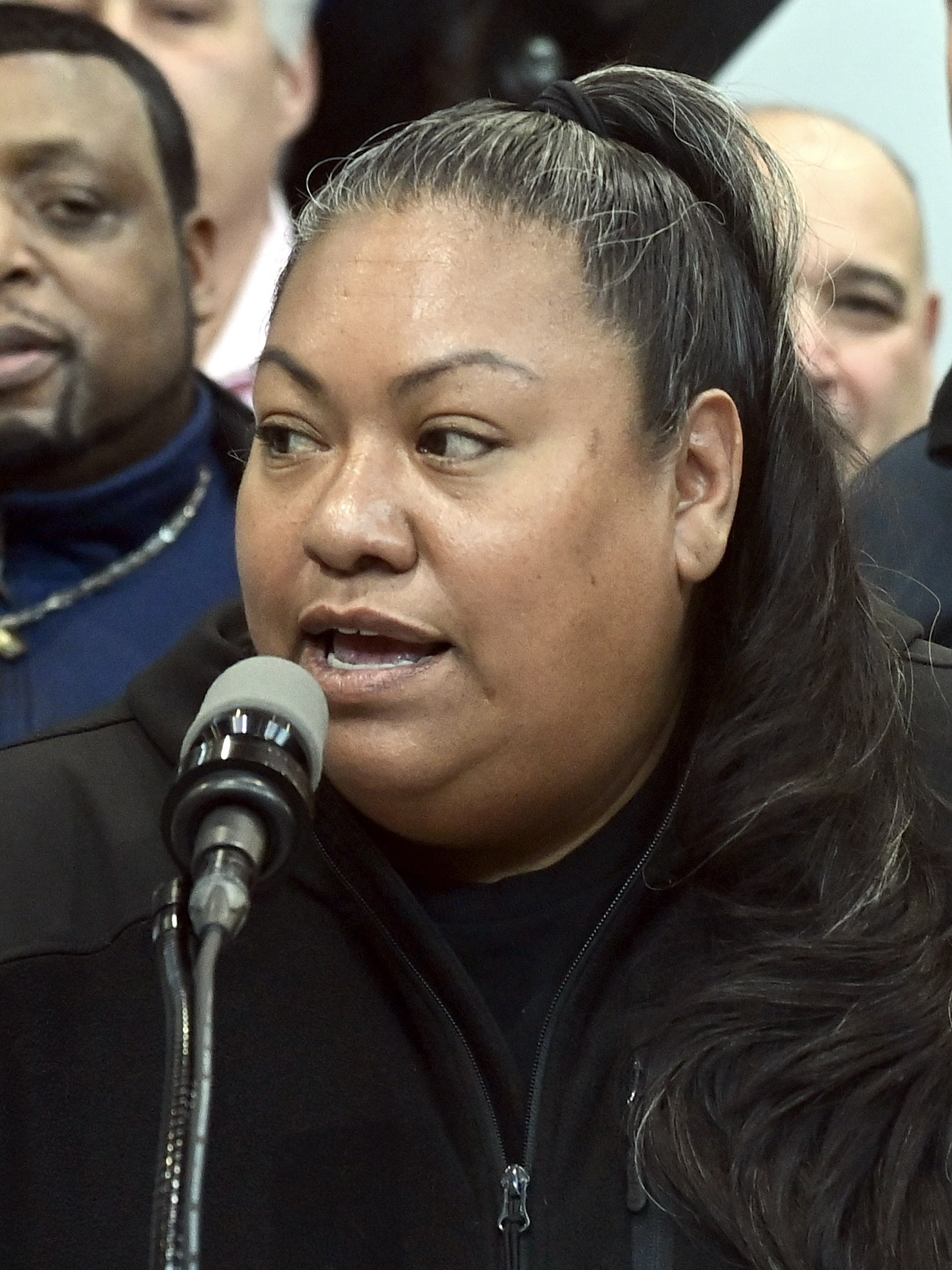

Member of the New York State Assembly from the 51st district
- Incumbent
- Assumed office January 1, 2021
- Preceded by: Felix W. Ortiz

Personal details
- Born: Peru
- Party: Democratic
- Other political affiliations: Democratic Socialists of America
- Education: Kingsborough Community College
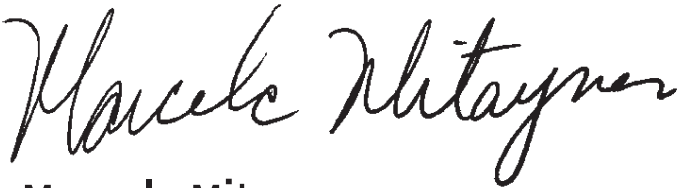
- Signature
- Website: Campaign website State Assembly website

Marcela Mitaynes is a Peruvian-American politician and tenant organizer. She is a member of the New York State Assembly, representing the 51st district as a Democrat. Mitaynes is a member of the New York City chapter of Democratic Socialists of America.

== Early life and education ==
After spending her early life in the Department of Puno, Peru, Mitaynes moved to New York City as a child and was raised in Sunset Park, Brooklyn. Mitaynes has an A.S. in Accounting from CUNY Kingsborough Community College.

== Electoral history ==
Mitaynes ran for elected office for the first time in the June 23, 2020, Democratic primary for the 51st district of the New York State Assembly. On election night, she trailed longtime incumbent Félix Ortiz by 464 votes. After absentee ballots had been counted, Mitaynes led Ortiz by 240 votes, and on July 16, 2020, Ortiz conceded defeat to Mitaynes. Given that the district skews heavily Democratic, Mitaynes ran unopposed in the November 3 general election and won her race. She was sworn in on January 1, 2021.

During the campaign, Mitaynes was endorsed by the New York City Democratic Socialists of America, the Sunrise Movement, the Working Families Party, State Senator Julia Salazar, Representative Alexandria Ocasio-Cortez, and actress and 2018 gubernatorial candidate Cynthia Nixon. She is a member of the New York State Socialists in Office.

== Political positions ==
Mitaynes first became politically active as a member of the tenants' rights movements in New York City, after she and her family were evicted from their apartment in 2006. She was active in the successful 2019 effort to lobby the New York State Legislature to pass stronger tenant protections. Mitaynes made housing issues central to her 2020 campaign. She supports cancelling rent for residential and commercial tenants, and cancelling mortgage payments for small landlords.

On August 19, 2021, she was arrested in an act of civil disobedience to oppose the end of New York's statewide eviction moratorium. The moratorium was extended later that month. Mitaynes also participated in a hunger strike in March and April 2021 in support of an "excluded workers fund" that was established to support undocumented workers who did not qualify for federal pandemic assistance.
