= MaRRS Spelling Bee =

MaRRS International Spelling Bee (MISB) is a spelling bee competition held in Asia for school children. It is conducted by MaRRS Intellectual Services Pvt. Ltd. The assessment and learning materials for the MISB is created in association with expert staff from the English and Foreign Language University, Hyderabad. The objective of the competition is to enhance the spelling and literary skills of children by encouraging them to explore the English language, expand their vocabulary and improve their communication and comprehension skills.

Unlike a normal spelling bee, the MISB has been designed as a motivational learning programme with training modules built in. The eleven rounds of the competition go beyond just spellings and tests almost all the elements of the English Language.

== Competition ==
The competition was started in 2003 and now close to a million students participate in the competition annually.

The First International Championship was conducted in Mumbai on 17 April 2007. Arjun B. Nair from Infant Jesus School, Kerala, was the first overall champion.

The Second International Championship was conducted on 8 November 2009 at two venues, Delhi and Dubai. 20 students from the Dubai centre and 60 students from the Indian centre qualified for the final round. Swetha Reddi of Ramakrishna public school, Visakhapatnam won the International championship for Category IV. Shivani Nirgudkar of Thakur Public School, Mumbai, was adjudged the best performer of the competition.

The Third International Championship was held at Nexus International School in Malaysia. Aditi D. Joshi of Manovikas School, Goa (India), was the best performer of the year.

The Fourth International Championship was held at Al Nahda Girls' School in Al Mushrif, Abu Dhabi. Juzer Malbari of Christ Church School in Mumbai was the best performer.

The Fifth International Championship was held at GCC International School, Thane, Maharasthra, Mumbai. Sidharth Ramchandra of the Brigade School in Karnataka was the best performer and Abhinand-P of Palghat Lions School, Kerala, was the Star speller.

== Rounds and levels ==
The competition begins from the school level and moves on to the first national assessment, state, national and finally to the international Level. Students are divided into six categories based on their grades at school. They face written and oral rounds. The written rounds are rounds such as dictation, jumbled letters, word application, crossword, idioms, and phrasal verbs. The oral rounds involve Spell It (students spell the words until they make a mistake), pronunciation and finally an antonyms and synonyms round. In 2012, two new rounds were added from the state oral and national written rounds onwards. The word origin round (oral) deals with etymology, while the supra-segmentals round (written) is divided into two – one with the marking of stress and syllables and the other with the identification of the underlined letter's pronunciation in IPA.
