= Greenwood Heights, Brooklyn =

Neighborhood in New York City

Greenwood Heights
- Neighborhood of Brooklyn
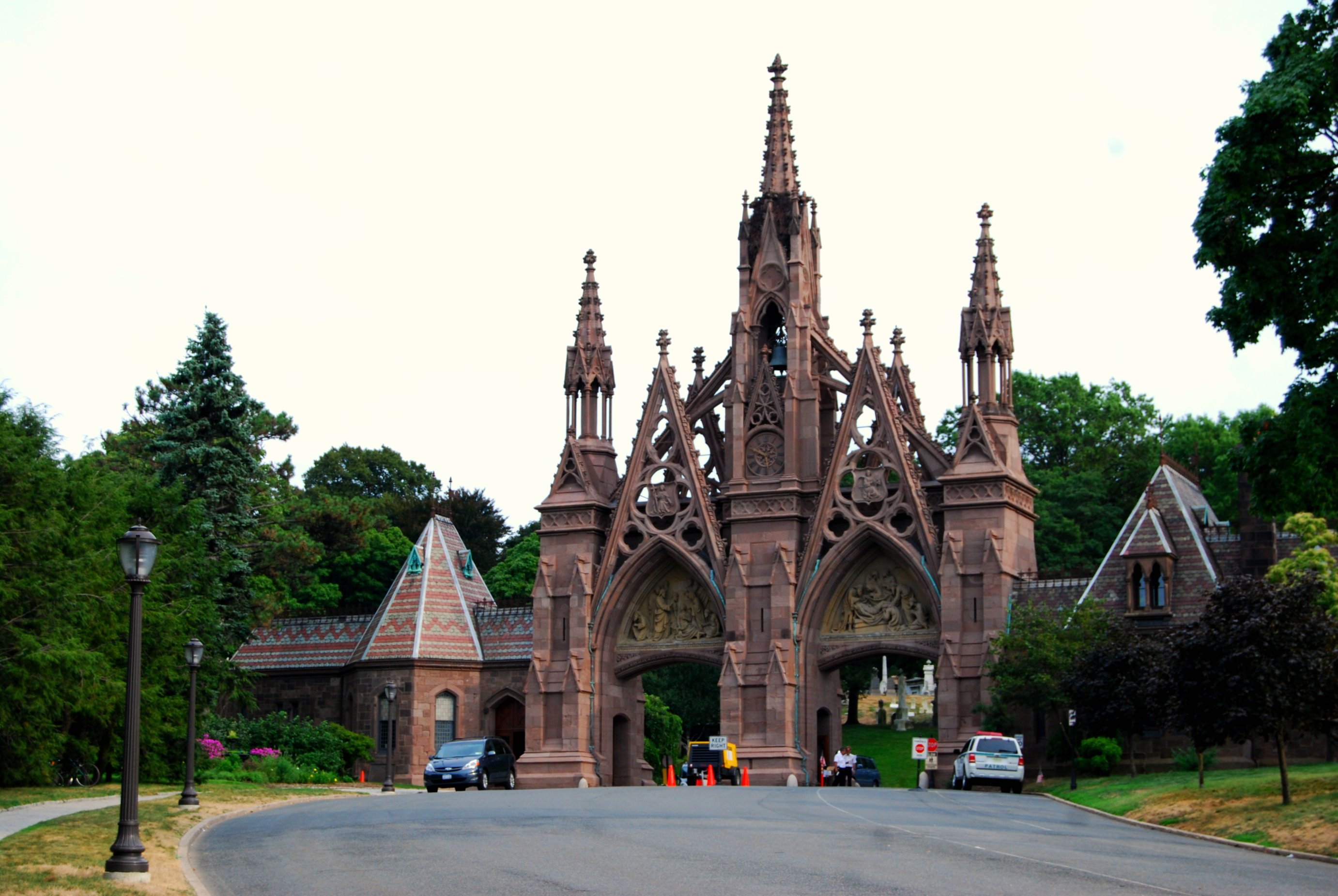
- Green-Wood Cemetery's Gothic Arch at 500 25th Street and 5th Avenue
- Interactive map of Greenwood Heights
- Coordinates: 40.659°N 74.000°W
- Country: United States
- State: New York
- City: New York City
- Borough: Brooklyn
- Community District: Brooklyn 7
- Time zone: UTC−5 (Eastern)
  - Summer (DST): UTC−4 (EDT)
- ZIP Code: 11232
- Area codes: 718, 347, 929, and 917

Greenwood Heights is a neighborhood in the New York City borough of Brooklyn, named partially after the adjacent Green-Wood Cemetery by real estate developers. Greenwood Heights is a part of Brooklyn Community District 7 along with Windsor Terrace, Sunset Park and South Slope. The much-debated borders are roughly the Prospect Expressway to the north, Gowanus Canal and Upper New York Bay to the west, Eighth Avenue to the east, and 39th Street to the south (along the southern boundary of the Green-Wood Cemetery and northern boundary of the 36th–38th Street Yard and South Brooklyn Railway).

Greenwood Heights, originally considered to be located within South Brooklyn, was incorporated into Sunset Park in the 1960s. A separate designation for the neighborhood was created by the 1980s. Today, Greenwood Heights overlaps with both Sunset Park and South Slope.

Greenwood Heights is a mixed neighborhood of Hispanics, older Polish and Italian families, Chinese, African American, and Brooklynites who have relocated from other higher-priced neighborhoods.

== History ==
South Brooklyn was one of the sites of the sprawling Battle of Brooklyn (Battle of Long Island) in August 1776, a pivotal battle in the American Revolutionary War to famous residents of Green-Wood Cemetery. In the 19th through middle 20th centuries the economy was dominated by the working Brooklyn waterfront. During the mid-20th century, what is now Greenwood Heights was also called Bush Terminal. The name applied to what is now the Industry City complex west of Third Avenue and the Gowanus Expressway. After the area was designated a "poverty area" in 1966, the area from 36th Street to the Prospect Expressway was incorporated into Sunset Park. As early as the late 1980s, the area was called Greenwood Heights. As the gentrification of South Brooklyn accelerated in the 2000s, the area was increasingly rebranded as Greenwood Heights, or alternatively as South Slope.

Recent new real estate development, curbed with the rezoning of the area in November 2005, has brought an influx of luxury condominium apartments into a residential area that was mainly made up of 1- and 2-family homes. Post-rezoning, while new development sites have occurred, there has been a new trend of home renovations, many of them "gut renovations" but others taking neglected c. 1900 wood-frame houses and restoring them to their historical look.

== Architecture ==
Greenwood Heights' architectural mix of wood frame, vinyl sided and brick homes gives the area an eclectic look and feel, different from its neighbors Park Slope to the north and Sunset Park to the south.

== Education ==
The neighborhood is home to several schools. P.S. 172 and P.S. 295 serve elementary school students; M.S. 88 middle schoolers; and the Hellenic Classical Charter School pre-K to 8th grade. In 1995, Al-Noor School, a private school teaching Arabic and Islamic culture was established between 20th and 21st streets on 4th Avenue.

== Transportation ==
The neighborhood is served by the 36th Street, 25th Street, and Prospect Avenue stations on the New York City Subway's BMT Fourth Avenue Line, served by the D, N, R, and W trains. The B37 and B63 buses also serve the neighborhood.
