= Brooklyn Community Board 7 =

Brooklyn Community District 7
- Community District
- Country: United States
- State: New York
- City: New York City
- Borough: Brooklyn
- Neighborhoods: List: Greenwood Heights; South Slope; Sunset Park; Windsor Terrace

Government
  - Chair: Cynthia Felix-Jeffers
  - District Manager: Jeremy Laufer

Area
  - Total: 3.7 sq mi (9.6 km^{2})

Population (2010)
  - Total: 126,230
  - Density: 34,000/sq mi (13,000/km^{2})

Ethnicity
  - African-American: 2.5%
  - Asian: 32.2%
  - Hispanic and Latino Americans: 41.1%
  - White: 22.6%
  - Others: 1.6%
- Time zone: UTC−5 (Eastern)
  - Summer (DST): UTC−4 (EDT)
- ZIP codes: 11215, 11220, 11218 and 11232
- Area code: 718, 347, 929, and 917
- Police Precincts: 72nd (website)
- Website: cbbrooklyn.cityofnewyork.us/cb7/

Brooklyn Community Board 7 is a New York City community board that encompasses the Brooklyn neighborhoods of Sunset Park, Windsor Terrace, and Greenwood Heights/ South Slope. It is delimited by Gowanus Bay on the west; by 15th Street and Prospect Park South West on the north; and by Caton Avenue, Fort Hamilton Parkway, 37th Street and 8th Avenue on the east, as well as by the Long Island Rail Road and Bay Ridge R.R. Yards on the south.

Its current chairperson is Cynthia Felix-Jeffers and its district manager was Jeremy Laufer, who retired in February 2026.

As of the United States Census, 2000, the Community Board has a population of 120,063, up from 102,553 in 1990 and 98,564 in 1980. Of them (as of 2000), 27,369 (22.8%) are White non Hispanic, 4,203 (3.5%) are African-American, 20,911 (17.4%) Asian or Pacific Islander, 258 (0.2%) American Indian or Native Alaskan, 668(0.6%) of some other race, 3,322 (2.8%) of two or more race, 63,332 (52.7%) of Hispanic origins. 40.7% of the population benefit from public assistance as of 2004, up from 23.0% in 2000. The land area is 2,709.3 acres (10.964 km^{2}).
