= Spelling bee =

Competition

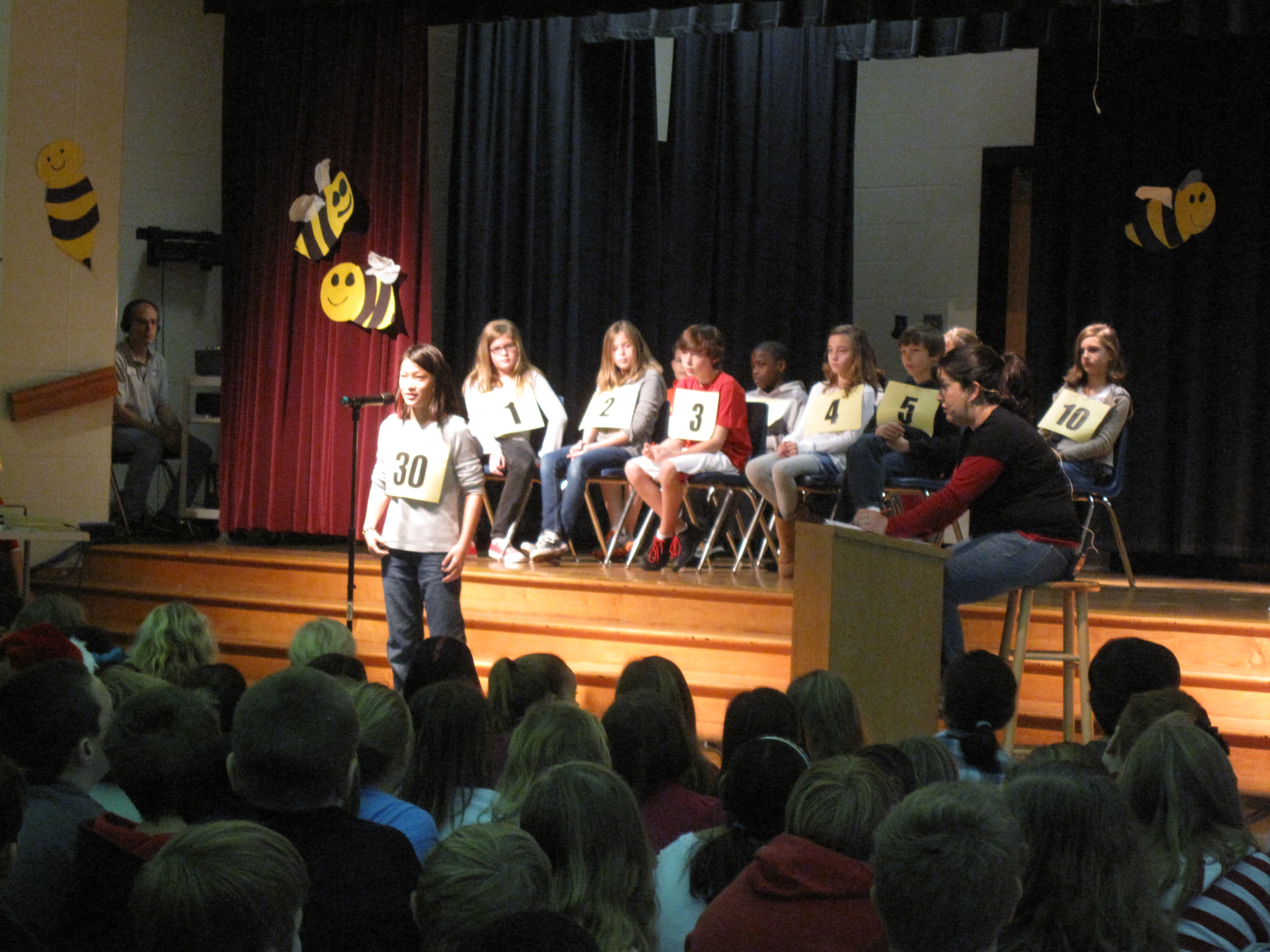
A spelling bee at an elementary school, with a speller addressing an audience and a judge, with other contestants behind

A spelling bee is a competition in which contestants are asked to spell a broad selection of words, usually with a varying degree of difficulty. To compete, contestants must memorize the spellings of words as written in dictionaries, and recite them accordingly.

Spelling bees are most commonly held in English due to its irregular spelling: languages with phonemic orthographies have a tight coupling between pronunciation and writing that would makes such competitions pointless.

== Etymology ==
Historically, the word "bee" has been used to describe a gathering for communal work, like a husking bee, a quilting bee, or an apple bee. According to etymological research recorded in dictionaries, the word "bee" probably comes from dialectal "been" or "bean" (meaning "help given by neighbors"), which came from Middle English bene (meaning "prayer", "boon" and "extra service by a tenant to his lord").

== History ==
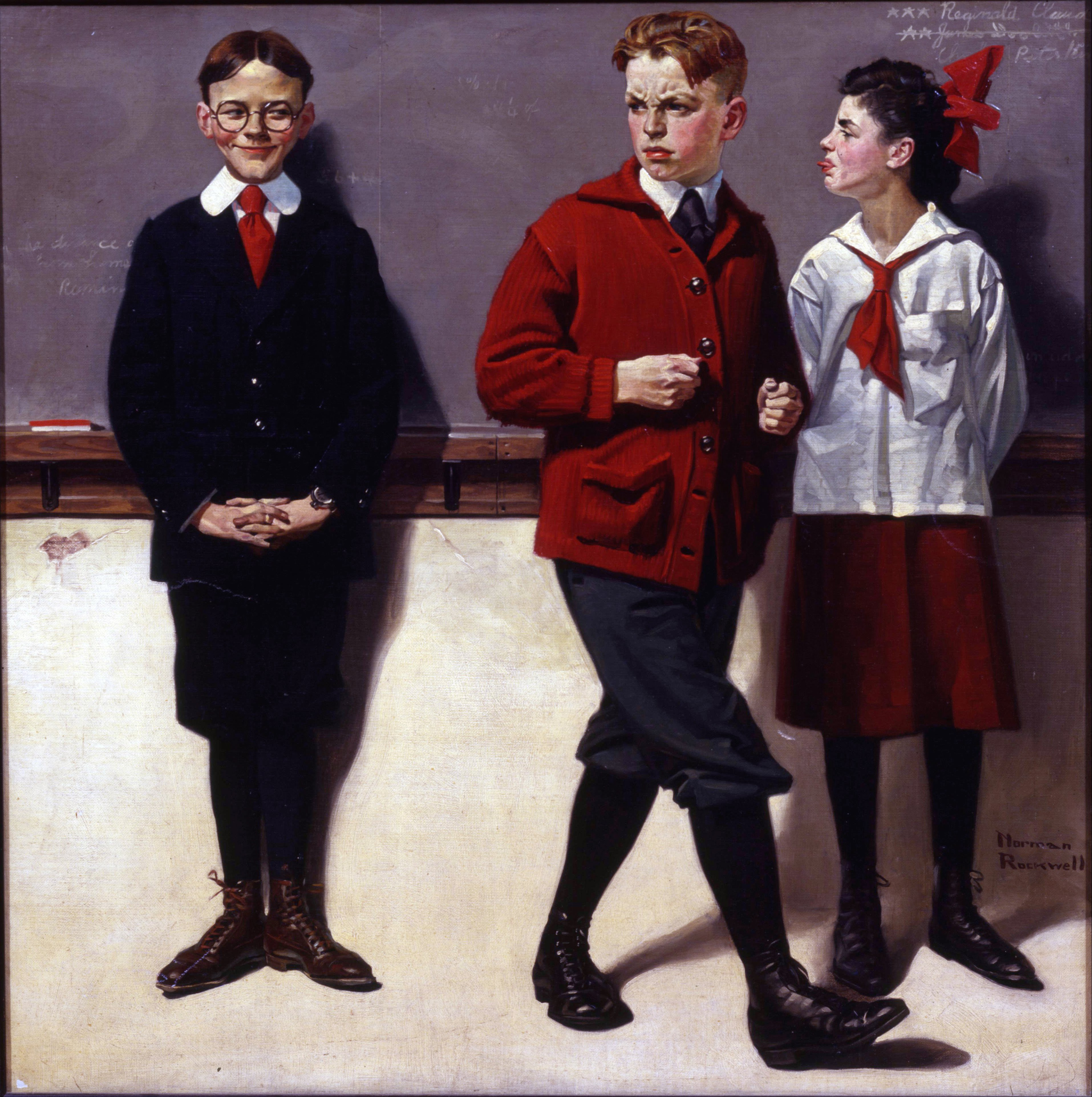
"Cousin Reginald Spells Peloponnesus." (Norman Rockwell, 1918)

The earliest known evidence of the phrase "spelling bee" in print dates back to 1850, although an earlier name, "spelling match", has been traced back to 1808. A key impetus for the contests was Noah Webster's spelling books. First published in 1786 and known colloquially as "The Blue-backed Speller", Webster's spelling books were an essential part of the curriculum of all elementary school children in the United States for five generations. Merriam-Webster Unabridged is now the key reference for the contests.

Spelling bees became widespread across the United States during the 19th century as a way to motivate students to learn standardized spelling. They were usually held in individual schools and towns, and were not nationally organized. In 1908, the National Education Association (NEA) held what it called the first national spelling bee at its convention in Cleveland, Ohio. Marie Bolden, a black girl from Cleveland, was named champion which caused a scandal in rivaling New Orleans.

The annual United States National Spelling Bee was started in 1925 by The Courier-Journal. The winner was Frank Neuhauser, age 11, who won the 1st National Spelling Bee in Washington, D.C. in 1925.

In the US, spelling bees are annually held from local levels up to the level of the Scripps National Spelling Bee, which awards a cash prize to the winner. The National Spelling Bee is sponsored by English-language newspapers and educational foundations; it is also broadcast on ESPN. Since 2006, the National Spelling Bee's championship rounds have been broadcast on ABC live. In 2005, contestants came from the Bahamas, Jamaica, Canada, and New Zealand, as well as the United States (including territories and overseas military bases). This was the first year that spellers from Canada and New Zealand attended the competition. The final authority for words is the Webster's Third New International Dictionary. The annual study list is available from Scripps, either online or in print.

The National Senior Spelling Bee started in Cheyenne, Wyoming, in 1996.

While the scope of most spelling bees is limited to individual countries or continents, there are also a few global Spelling Bees such as ISB Spelling Bee International, which has participation from across the world.

== In English ==
=== Africa ===
In Ghana, The Spelling Bee Ghana is organized annually, with the winners being flown to the US to represent Ghana at the Scripps National Spelling Bee.

Nigeria's spelling bee is called the Nigeria Spelling Bee, and is organized by the Bee Spelling Competition Initiative in states across the federation of Nigeria.

Many other African countries are also part of the African Spelling Bee.

==== Nigeria ====
The Nigeria Spelling Bee is organized in states across the federation, with national finalists drawn after qualifying from their respective states and one of the six geo-political zones of the country.

The Nigeria Spelling Bee, which is the most widespread spelling bee in the country, has so far been conducted in more than 25 states across Nigeria by the organizers (Bee Spelling Competition Initiative) and has been endorsed by the Federal Ministry of Education, Ministry of Culture and the state ministries of education.

Winners of the Nigeria Spelling Bee win up to ₦1,000,000 in scholarship and participate as the official Nigerian delegates in the annual African Spelling Bee, which is a continental event organized by the African Spelling Bee Consortium.

There is also an annual event in Lagos State called the New Era Foundation Spelling Bee, which had its first competition in 2001. This spelling bee is held among all public primary and secondary schools in Lagos State, with the winner and runner-ups of the secondary school category carting away prizes ranging from cash, to a trip to Finland, to the most outstanding one being the opportunity for the overall winner to serve as one-day governor of the state alongside runner-ups as cabinet members. The spelling bee has to date (2021) produced 20 one-day governors, with the winner in the year 2020 being a female student from Angus Memorial Senior High School, Shomolu Lagos - Miss Jemimah Marcus.

=== Asia ===
In Asia, a spelling bee is conducted up to the international level by MaRRS Spelling Bee. The competition involves learning the correct spelling of words and their use in sentences and in multiple contexts. Currently, it is held in India, Abu Dhabi, Ajman, Bahrain, Dubai, Fujairah, Ras al Khaimah, Sharjah, and Umm-Al-Quwain.

==== Singapore ====
In Singapore, the RHB-The Straits Times National Spelling Championship, informally known as the Big Spell, is a spelling bee held annually open to Primary 4, 5 and 6 students from 2012 to 2017. It is organized by The Straits Times and RHB Bank, in partnership with the Ministry of Education. In different years, it has also been supported by various organisations, companies, and institutions such as the National Library Board, HP, and ITE College Central. Its highest turnout was of approximately 1800 students in 2016's preliminary round.

=== Australia ===
In Western Australia, a spelling bee is held by the State Library Foundation of Western Australia, for children in school years five, six, seven, and eight. The early stages of the competition are held online, and the final spell-off in front of a live audience. Two major prizes are awarded: one for a Junior Winner (Years 5–6) and the other for a Senior Winner (Years 7–8). Further prizes are given to the teacher and school class of each major prize winner, and to the most improved speller each week.

=== Bangladesh ===
Starting in 2012, Bangladesh's English daily newspaper, The Daily Star and e-Learning portal Champs21.com have been organizing a televised spelling bee on Channel i for the students of class six to ten from Bengali and English medium backgrounds, who compete through their schools and the Champs21 website. The spelling bee team visits 7 divisional cities (Dhaka, Chittagong, Sylhet, Rangpur, Rajshahi, Khulna & Barisal) to test top 1% speller and top 96 speller of the season participate in the television show. The competition is the first such arrangement in Bangladesh. The champion is rewarded with a trip to Washington, DC. The winners of season 2 met the honorable president of the People's Republic of Bangladesh Advocate Abdul Hamid. The fourth season was held in 2016.

=== India ===
The India Spelling Bee is held for school students across the country, featuring school-level, state and regional-level, and national-level competitions. The contest focuses on commonly used but misspelled words for students. It also organizes corporate and institutional contests.

=== Spanish-speaking countries in the Americas ===
Different companies/schools organize and participate in different, independent spelling bees, but the largest company in Latin America to organize annual international spelling bees since 2015 is Advanced Methods Corporation (Amco), a U.S.-based company that promotes learning English as a second language. Schools from Mexico, Guatemala, Costa Rica, Chile, Honduras, and El Salvador enrolled to the Amco system are eligible to participate in the annual Amco Spelling Bee, consisting of 3 stages: school (selection of students to participate in the regional, repeats with the next stages), regional, and international. The international one is always set in Guadalajara, Jalisco, in Expo Guadalajara, and is almost always held in the last days of May or beginnings of June.

=== United Kingdom ===
In 1876 there were newspaper reports of spelling bees in a number of towns in the United Kingdom. Since 2009, The Times newspaper has run a spelling bee for schools: The Times Spelling Bee.

=== Vanuatu ===
One of the first spelling bee competitions in Vanuatu took place in August 2019. Six primary schools and 36 students on the main island of Vanuatu participated and competed for secondary school scholarships. The SHEFA education office and Peace Corps Volunteers collaborated to make the spelling bee possible.

== See also ==
- Bible bee
- Chinese Characters Dictation Competition
- Dictation (exercise)
- Kanji Kentei
- Spelling alphabet
