= Storehouse No. 2, U.S. Navy Fleet Supply Base =

- U.S. National Register of Historic Places
- New York State Register of Historic Places
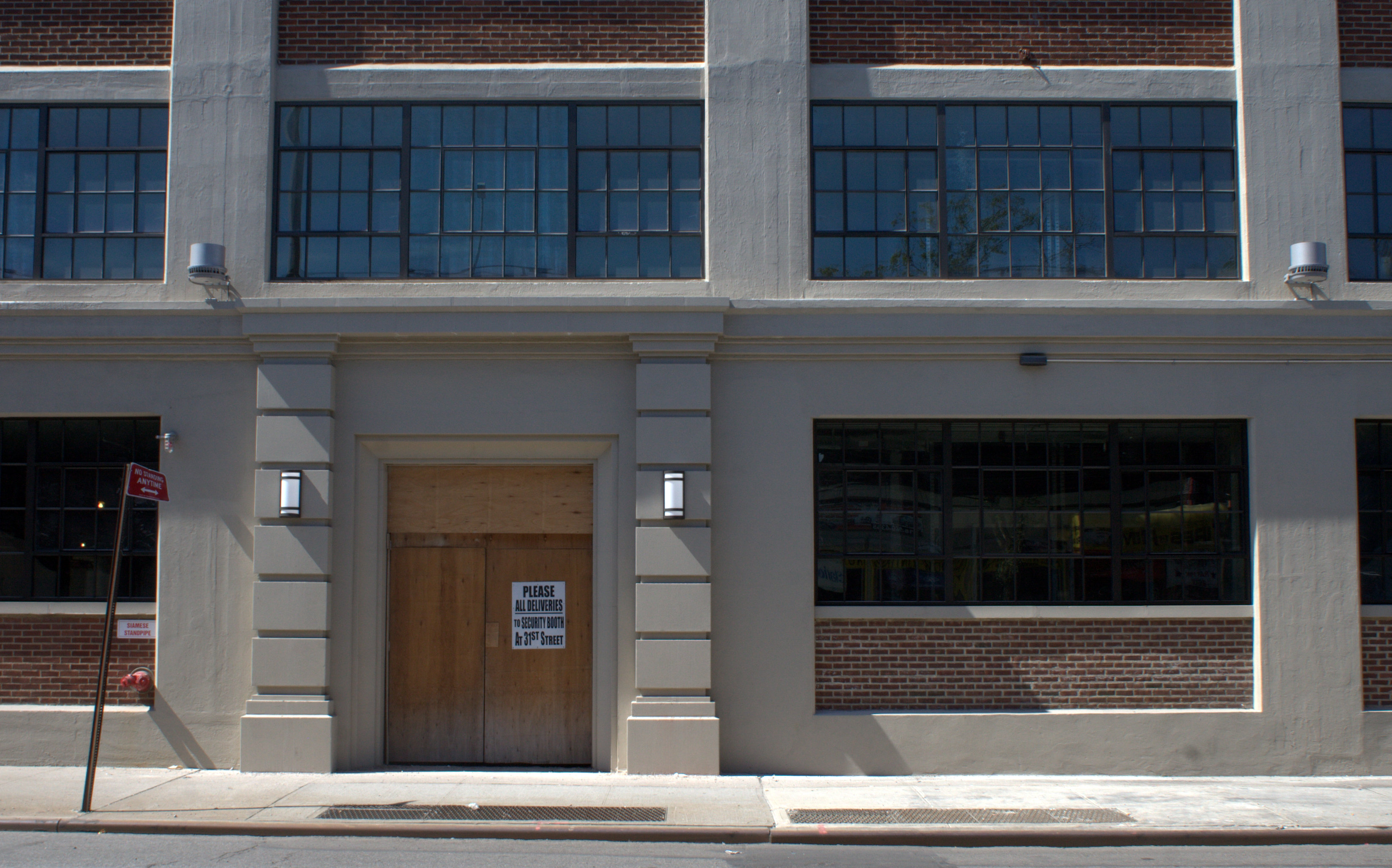

- Location within New York City Location within New York Location within the United States
- Location: 850 3rd Avenue, Brooklyn, New York
- Coordinates: 40°39′34″N 74°00′16″W
- Area: 3.61 acres (1.46 ha)
- Built: 1917
- Built by: Turner Construction
- Architect: Hollyday, Capt. R.C; Chapman, Howard
- Architectural style: Classical Revival
- NRHP reference No.: 13000026
- NYSRHP No.: 04701.000446

Significant dates
- Added to NRHP: February 20, 2013
- Designated NYSRHP: December 27, 2012

The Storehouse No. 2 is a historic warehouse located in the Sunset Park neighborhood of Brooklyn, New York. It was a building in the United States Navy Fleet supply base that was built during World War I. It was built in 1917 by Turner Construction, and is an eight-story, reinforced concrete building in the Classical Revival style. The building measures 700 feet by 200 feet and occupies the entire block bounded by Second and Third avenues and 30th and 31st streets.

It was listed on the National Register of Historic Places in 2013.
