= Sunset Park High School =

Public school in New York City

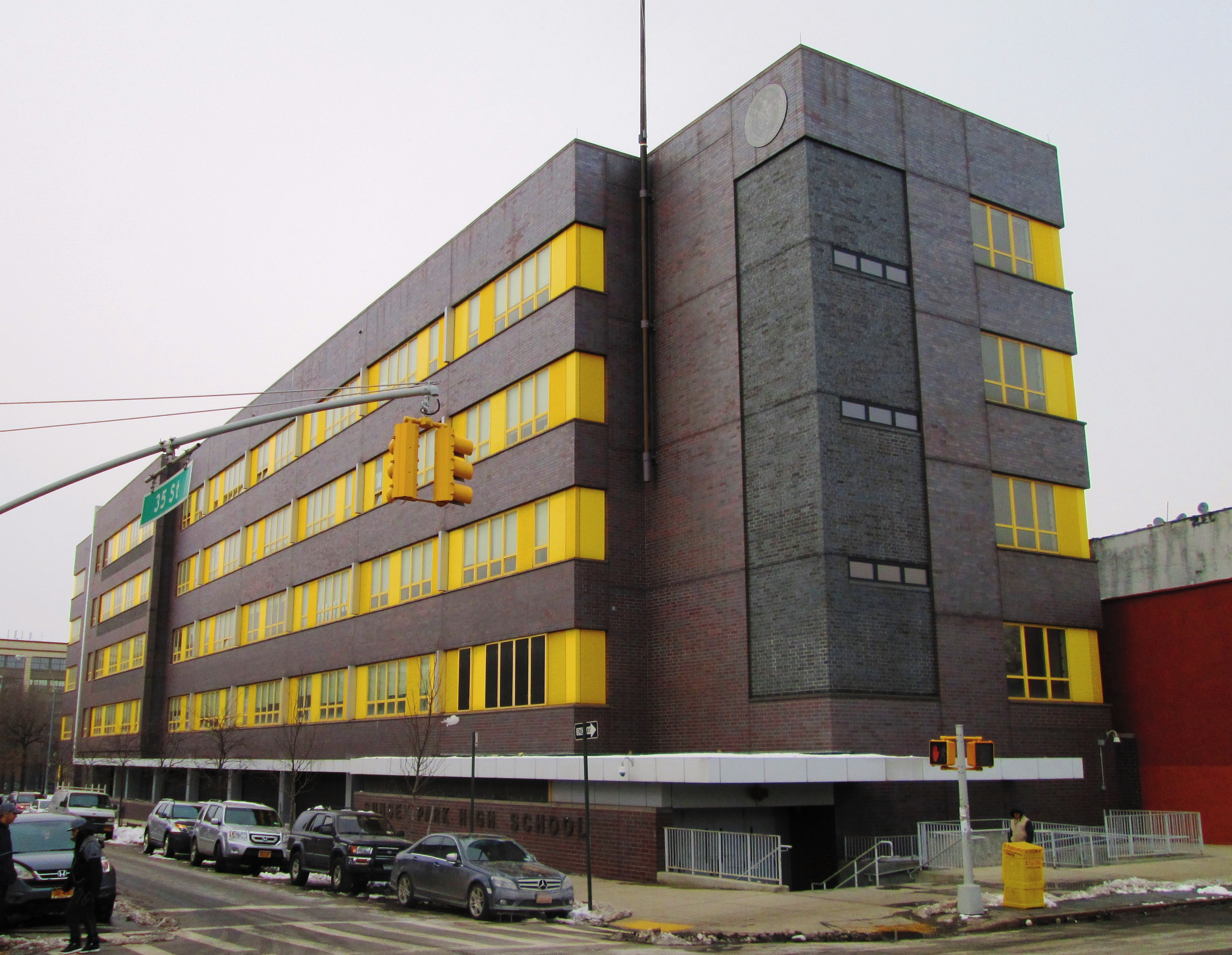

Location
- 153 35th Street; Brooklyn, New York 11232; United States; 40.6556°N 74.0042°W

Information
- Type: Public high school
- Motto: Community, collaboration, and equity
- Established: 2009
- School district: 15
- Principal: Miguel Negron
- Faculty: 99.42 FTEs
- Grades: 9–12
- Enrollment: 1,312 (as of 2015–16)
- Student to teacher ratio: 13.2:1
- Colors: Red, Orange, yellow and black
- Website: sunsetparkhighschool.org

Sunset Park High School is a public high school located at 153 35th Street, in Sunset Park, Brooklyn, New York, United States, under the jurisdiction of the New York City Department of Education. The school was built in 2009. The current principal is Miguel Negron.

== Overview ==
Sunset Park High School is a college-preparatory high school. All students are programmed for an advanced regents diploma.

The school was built in 2009 and the building is fully accessible to people with physical disabilities.

== Programs ==
=== Advanced Placement ===
The school offers Advanced Placement courses Computer Science Principles, Biology, English Language and Composition, AP English Literature and Composition, Spanish language and culture AP Seminar, and U.S. Government and Politics .

=== Sports ===
The school offers a variety of varsity and junior varsity sports. These sports include badminton, baseball, basketball, handball, soccer, softball, volleyball and wrestling.

=== Extracurricular activities ===
The school offers many extracurricular activities, including Art, Chorus, Dance, Debate, Homework Help/Tutoring, Internship Program, Knitting, Literary Magazine, Makers-Club, Music Production, National Honor Society, Photography, SAT Prep, Student Council, Theater, Urban Barcode Club (Science Focused-DNA), and Yearbook. In addition to a school-wide Student Council, students can also participate in a small learning community-based student leadership team.

=== Dual-language program ===
In 2018, the school added a Spanish Dual Language program.

=== Internship program ===
Students in the 12th grade have an opportunity to participate in internships at community organizations, hospitals, government offices and food, technology and design firms. Students participate in the internship site for 4 hours a well as well as attend weekly professional development seminars at the school. Students gain professional work experience and credits required for high school graduation.
