= Opportunities for a Better Tomorrow =

- Type: Nonprofit organization
- Founded: 1983
- Number of locations: Sunset Park, Bushwick and Jamaica (Queens); United States
- Key people: Dr. Darlene Williams (President & Chief Executive Officer)
- Revenue: 7,280,955 United States dollar (2022)
- Total assets: 2,362,813 United States dollar (2022)
- Number of employees: 80 - 100
- Website: www.obtjobs.org

Opportunities for a Better Tomorrow (OBT) is a non-profit with locations in Brooklyn and Queens in New York City. In 2013, OBT partnered with the YMCA of Greater New York in the creation of Y Roads Centers.

== History ==
Opportunities for a Better Tomorrow was founded in 1983 by Sister Mary Franciscus, RSM, to provide job training to the at-risk youth of Sunset Park, Brooklyn. OBT began in a rundown storefront with the support of a small government contract. By 1992, additional public and private support allowed the organization to move into a larger building in the same vicinity. At this time, OBT launched a job training program for adults and started a support program for graduates. Eventually, daytime and evening remedial education programs were also added. In 2001, the organization expanded its youth program by opening a second location, OBT North, in the Bushwick/Bedford–Stuyvesant sections of Brooklyn. In 2002, OBT won a PEPnet Builder award "for their commitment to continuous improvement" in working with youth. In 2006, after the untimely passing of Sr. Mary, OBT hired Randolph Peers, formerly Vice President of the Brooklyn Chamber of Commerce, as the new chief executive officer. In 2013 Opportunities for a Better Tomorrow partnered with the YMCA of Greater New York to open Y Roads centers across New York City. The first Y Roads center opened in Jamaica, Queens, in 2013 to provide the disconnected youth in the Jamaica community with education, job training, and support services. A second Y Roads center opened in Mott Haven, Bronx in October 2014. In July 2015, Opportunities for a Better Tomorrow intends to officially merge with the Maura Clarke-Ita Ford Center (MCIF), which has been operating out of OBT's Bushwick Workforce Resource Center (BWRC) since September 2014.

In 2021 the Board of Directors appointed Dr. Darlene Williams as the President and chief executive officer.

== Services ==
=== Youth Education and Job Training ===
OBT's service model is unique among youth programs due to its comprehensive scope of training and its emphasis on personal discipline. The youth training model is an intensive 20-week program that includes high school equivalency classes (if needed), business math, business English, office procedures, computer classes (MS Office), public speaking and communications, and a world-of-work module. A simulated real work environment is an integral part of the entire curriculum. Participants are required to punch in and out on a time clock each day, dress professionally, and are given work assignments with timelines for completion. Excessive lateness and absenteeism result in the participants being “terminated” from the program. Students that successfully complete the 20-weeks emerge with a high school equivalency diploma and the skills necessary to obtain and retain employment. Most of OBT's job placements are clerical and administrative office related positions in financial services firms, law firms, government, and other related businesses. OBT's overall job placement percentage averages about 72% annually. One fifth of OBT's graduates also go on to enroll in college. The Youth Education and Job Training program is available at OBT's locations in Sunset Park and Williamsburg/Bushwick in Brooklyn; Jamaica, Queens; and Mott Haven, Bronx

=== Young Adult Internship Program ===
The Young Adult Internship Program is a 14-week job training and internship program available to young adults, ages 17 – 24, who live in New York City with preference given to those who live in the neighborhoods of Williamsburg, Bedford–Stuyvesant, Crown Heights, and Bushwick in Brooklyn and in Jamaica, Queens. The interns participate in five weeks of intensive business skills training followed an eleven-week paid internship. OBT's internship sites include: the Brooklyn Chamber of Commerce, New York State and New York City government offices, Weeksville Heritage Center, Brooklyn Navy Yard, Vernon Avenue Children's School, and Woodhull Medical Center.

=== Medical Administrative Assistant ===
The Medical Administrative Assistant Training Program provides youth, ages 17–21, with experience and training to have a successful career in the medical field. Participants receive training in medical terminology, communications, customer service and basic bookkeeping. Participants also receive a Medical Administrative Assistant Certification through the National Healthcareer Association and an internship in a hospital or doctor's office.

=== Anchoring Achievement in Mexican Communities ===
In 2013, OBT started an initiative specifically targeting youth in the Mexican community in Bushwick, Brooklyn to help improve retention in high school and help Mexican youth continue on to college. In partnership with Churches United for Fair Housing, and Academy of Urban Planning (AUP). OBT runs the Growing Responsibly through Ownership and Willingness (GROW) program at St. Joseph Patron church, and the Anchor Up program at AUP. Each program meets once a week, in an effort to increase personal and professional development in its participants through career and college exploration and recreational activities including soccer, music, and art (at GROW).

=== Leading to Success ===
In 2014, as part of the Cure Violence initiative by the New York City Mayor's Office and Councilman Jumaane Williams, who is a co-chair of the New York City Council's Task Force to Combat Gun Violence, Opportunities for a Better Tomorrow launched their Leading to Success Program in conjunction with other community groups including Gangstas Making Astronomical Community Changes (G.M.A.C.C.), Sesame Flyers, and East Flatbush Village and leaders in the East Flatbush neighborhood of Brooklyn. The program is an evidence-based public health approach, which identifies and engages individuals most likely to be involved in gun violence and deploys interventions aimed at curbing that behavior before it occurs, including retaliatory shootings. The initiative combines six city agencies and organizations to work with violence interrupters and mediators as well as provide rap around community-based preventive services. This month-long program for community members, ages 16–21, provides job skills training, resume help, and job placement assistance or college access assistance. OBT will also provide services for community members up to the age of 30, which will include job placement assistance.

=== Cloud Support Engineer and Digital Marketing program ===
OBT's 12-week Cloud Support Engineer and Digital Marketing program focuses on careers in the IT/Innovation sector. Students gain industry-specific soft and hard skills including Linux and Security fundamentals, networking concepts, relational databases, and cloud. Program graduates can also earn up to 15 credits for enrollment at CUNY School of Professional Studies. Upon successful completion the students receive certifications through Amazon Web Services, Google, and Facebook and are advised by a Tech Pathways Employment Specialist who connects them to tech-sector opportunities that range from internships to full time positions that pay 45-65k annually.

=== Masonry Restoration Technician Training ===
Masonry Restoration Technician Training is offered through a partnership with Green-Wood Cemetery, the World Monuments Fund, and the International Masonry Institute (IMI). The program combines education and pre-apprenticeship programming for hands-on training in construction trades, with graduates earning industry-certified credentials.

=== Office of New Americans ===
OBT's Office for New Americans located at the Bushwick Workforce Resource Center exists to provide New Yorkers with free services for the immigration applications such as Naturalization, Renewal of Green Card, Certificate of Citizenship, Deferred Action for Childhood Arrivals (DACA) and Deferred Action for Parental Accountability, as well as referrals to other no or low-cost immigration services throughout the city. ONA also offers entrepreneurship classes taught in Spanish.
