= Sunset Park Courthouse =

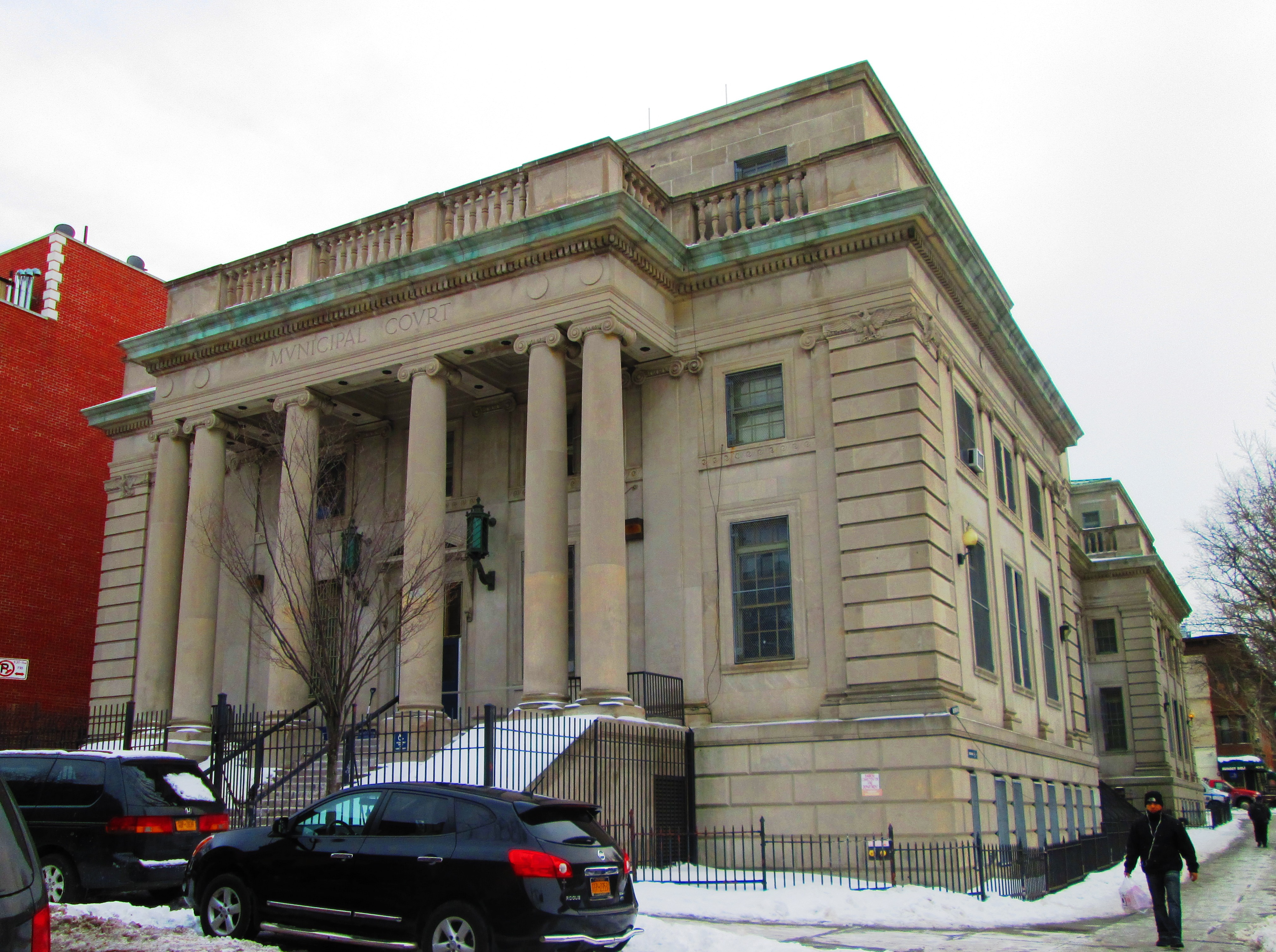
- The Municipal Court entrance on 42nd Street to the former Sunset Park Courthouse (2015)

- Location within New York City

General information
- Status: converted to non-judicial use (1962)
- Architectural style: Neoclassical
- Location: 4201 4th Avenue between 42nd and 43rd Streets, Sunset Park, Brooklyn, New York City, US
- Coordinates: 40.650504°N 74.007929°W
- Current tenants: New York Police Department; Community Board 7
- Construction started: 1930
- Completed: 1931
- Renovated: 1996
- Client: City of New York

Design and construction
- Architect: Mortimaer Dickerson Metcalfe
- Designations: New York City Landmark (June 26, 2001)

Renovating team
- Architect: Helpern Arcnitects

The Sunset Park Courthouse is a historic courthouse located at 4201 4th Avenue between 42nd and 43rd Streets, in the Sunset Park neighborhood of Brooklyn, New York City. It was built in 1930-31 and was designed by Mortimer Dickerson Metcalfe – the Deputy State Architect under Franklin B. Ware. Metcalfe used the Neoclassical style for the building, which is one of only two courthouses in the city he designed. The limestone-facaded building with Ionic columns has separate facades and entrances for the Municipal Court, on 42nd Street, and the Magistrates Court, on 43rd Street. The two facades are almost identical.

The building, which is one of only a handful of historic buildings remaining in the neighborhood, was converted for non-court use in 1962.

In 1970 it was the location of the New York City Job Preparation Center, and Community Board 7 also moved into the building at about this time. By 1973 the Sunset Park Senior Citizens Center and other non-profit agencies were located there. A full renovation of the building was completed by Helpern Artitects in 1996, and the New York Police Department moved into the building shortly afterwards, to use as its primary processing center for applicants.

The building was designated a New York City Landmark in 2001.

== See also ==
- List of New York City Landmarks
