= Former 18th Police Precinct Station =

- 18th Police Precinct; Station House and Stable
- U.S. National Register of Historic Places
- New York State Register of Historic Places
- New York City Landmark
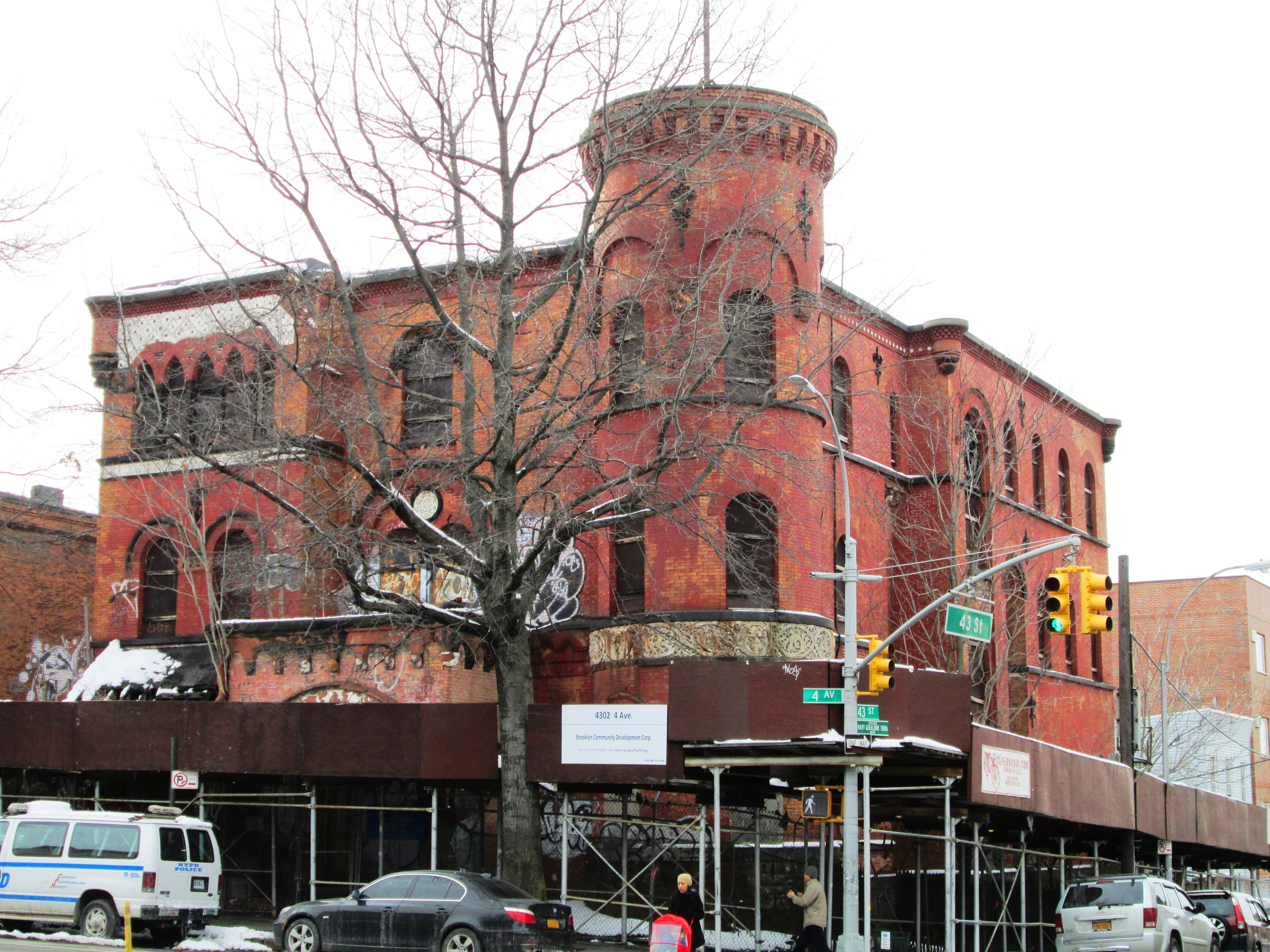
- 18th Police Precinct Station House and Stable in 2015
- Location: 4302 4th Avenue, Sunset Park, Brooklyn, New York 11220, US
- Coordinates: 40°39′1″N 74°0′34″W
- Built: 1890-1892
- Architects: Gruwe`, Emile M.
- Architectural style: Romanesque Revival
- NRHP reference No.: 82003359
- NYSRHP No.: 04701.001609
- NYCL No.: 1129

Significant dates
- Added to NRHP: June 3, 1982
- Designated NYSRHP: April 9, 1982
- Designated NYCL: April 12, 1983

The former 18th Police Precinct Station House and Stable of the Brooklyn Police Department is a historic police station and stable located in the Sunset Park neighborhood of Brooklyn, New York City. The two buildings were completed in 1892. The station house, which later was used by the New York City Police Department's 68th Precinct, is a three-story brick building with carved stone detailing in the Romanesque Revival style. It features a projecting corner tower and Norman-inspired projecting main entrance portico. The stable is a two-story brick building connected to the station house by a one-story brick passage. It ceased being used as a police station in 1970, and was bought by the Sunset Park School of Music.

The building was listed on the National Register of Historic Places in 1982, and was designated a New York City landmark in 1983.

== See also ==
- List of New York City Landmarks
- National Register of Historic Places listings in New York County, New York
