= Sunset Park, Brooklyn =

Neighborhood in New York City

Sunset Park
- Neighborhood of Brooklyn
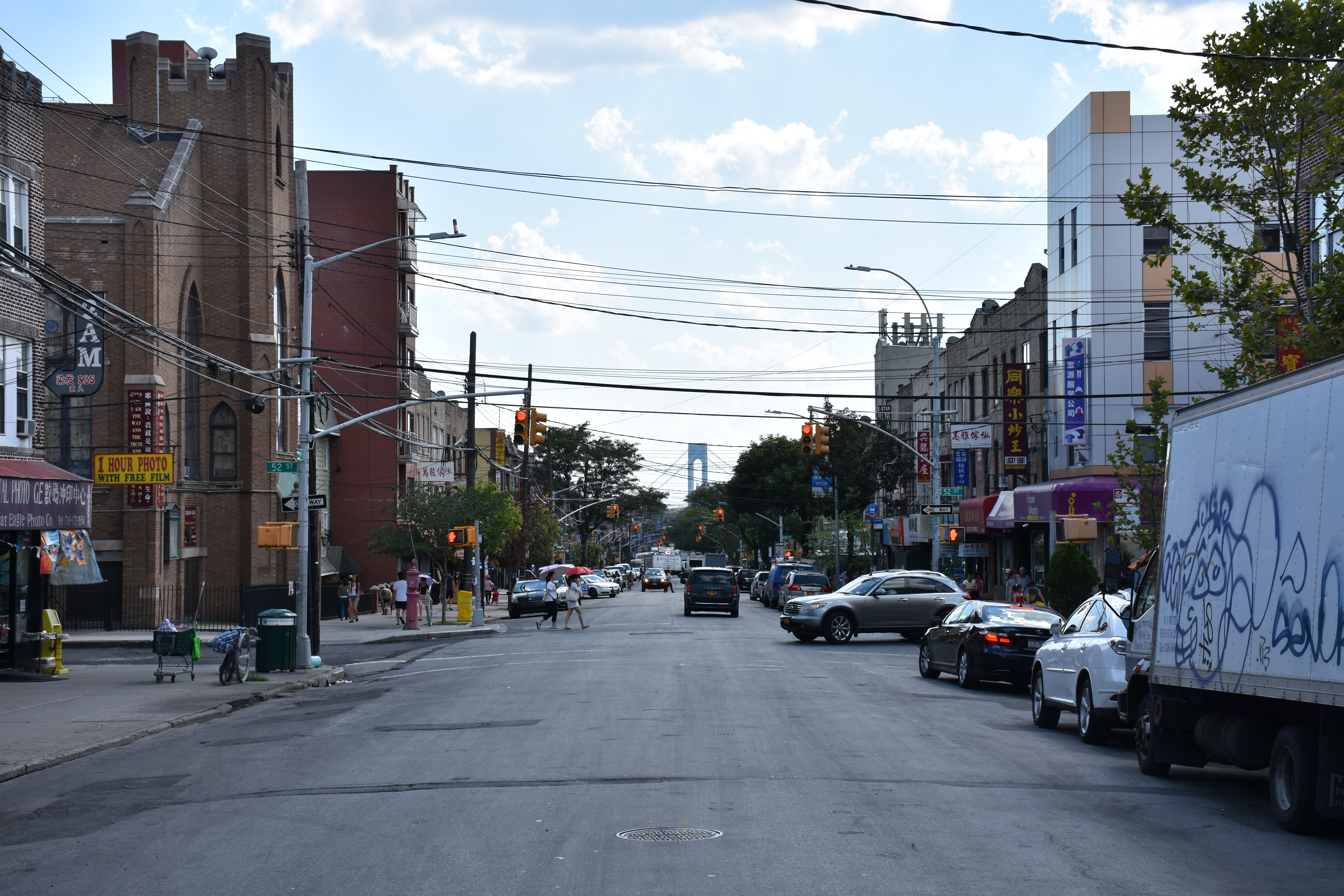
- Eighth Avenue and 52nd Street
- Location in New York City
- Coordinates: 40°38′36″N 74°00′52″W
- Country: United States
- State: New York
- City: New York City
- Borough: Brooklyn
- Community District: Brooklyn 7

Population (2010)
  - Total: 126,000
- Time zone: UTC−5 (Eastern)
  - Summer (DST): UTC−4 (EDT)
- ZIP Codes: 11220, 11232
- Area code: 718, 347, 929, and 917
- Sunset Park Historic District
- U.S. National Register of Historic Places
- U.S. Historic district
- New York State Register of Historic Places
- Location within New York City Location within New York Location within the United States
- Location: Roughly bounded by the Upper New York Bay, Thirty-sixth St., Ninth Ave. and Sixty-fifth St., Brooklyn, New York
- Area: 280 acres (110 ha)
- Architects: Pohlman & Patrick; et al.
- Architectural style: Renaissance Revival, Romanesque Revival, Neo-Grec; Classical Revival
- NRHP reference No.: 88001464

Significant dates
- Added to NRHP: September 15, 1988
- Designated NYSRHP: 1988

Sunset Park is a neighborhood in the western part of the New York City borough of Brooklyn, bounded by Park Slope and Green-Wood Cemetery to the north, Borough Park to the east, Bay Ridge to the south, and New York Harbor to the west. (Note: Because it was once close to the southern boundary of the City of Brooklyn, Sunset Park is considered to be part of "South Brooklyn". However, until the 1960s, South Brooklyn was used to refer to the area north of 39th Street and Bay Ridge encompassed the area south of 39th Street.) The neighborhood is named for a public park of the same name that covers 24.5 acres (9.9 ha) between Fifth and Seventh Avenues from 41st to 44th Street. The area north of 36th Street is alternatively known as Greenwood Heights, while the section north of 20th Street is also called South Slope.

The area was initially occupied by the Canarsee band of Munsee-speaking Lenape until the first European settlement occurred in 1636 as part of New Netherland. Through the late 19th century, Sunset Park was sparsely developed and was considered part of Bay Ridge or South Brooklyn. The arrival of elevated railways and the subway led to Sunset Park's development, with middle-class row houses and industrial buildings being erected in the 1890s through the 1920s. After the decline of the industrial hubs in the 1940s and 1950s, the name "Sunset Park" was given to the region north of 65th Street as part of an urban renewal initiative. Immigrant groups started moving to the neighborhood in the late 20th century due to its relative affordability. By the 21st century, the neighborhood's population is primarily composed of Scandinavian, Irish, Italian, Hispanics and Chinese immigrants along with swaths of predominantly white young urban professionals.

Sunset Park is part of Brooklyn Community District 7. It is patrolled by the 72nd Precinct of the New York City Police Department. Fire services are provided by the New York City Fire Department's Engine Company 201 and Engine Company 228/Ladder Company 114. Politically, Sunset Park is represented by the New York City Council's 38th and 39th Districts.

== History ==
=== Early settlement ===
Though modern-day Brooklyn is coextensive with Kings County, this was not always the case. South Brooklyn, an area in central Kings County extending to the former Brooklyn city line near Green-Wood Cemetery's southern border, was originally settled by the Canarsee, one of several indigenous Lenape peoples who farmed and hunted on the land. The Canarsee had several routes that crossed Brooklyn, including a path from Fulton Ferry along the East River that extended southward to Gowanus Creek, South Brooklyn (present-day Sunset Park), and Bay Ridge. The Canarsee traded with other indigenous peoples, and by the early 17th century, also with Dutch and English settlers.

The first European settlement occurred in 1636 when Willem Adriaenszen Bennett and Jacques Bentyn purchased 936 acres (379 ha) between 28th and 60th Streets, in what is now Sunset Park. However, after the land was purchased in the 1640s by Dutch settlers who laid out their farms along the waterfront, the Canarsee were soon displaced, and had left Brooklyn by the 18th century. The area comprising modern Sunset Park was divided between two Dutch towns: Brooklyn to the northwest and New Utrecht to the southeast, divided by a boundary that ran diagonally from Seventh Avenue/60th Street to Ninth Avenue/37th Street. The Dutch created long, narrow farms in the area. When New Netherland was conveyed to the English in 1664, the latter improved the waterfront pathway in the town of Brooklyn as part of a Gowanus (Coast) Road, which ran southwest to an east–west trail called Martense's Lane, then southward to the boundary with New Utrecht. These roads would be used during the American Revolutionary War in the Battle of Long Island.

During the American Revolution, the area was mostly owned by the descendants of Hans Hansen Bergen, an early immigrant from Norway. They owned two homesteads, the DeHart-Bergen House close to 37th Street and the Johannes Bergen House around 55th Street; the former was used by the British during the Revolution. In addition, the Bergens owned several slaves, as indicated in the 1800 United States census, where 19 slaves and 8 free non-whites were recorded living at the two Bergen houses. After New York abolished slavery in 1827, there were 55 African Americans living in the area. Similar to Dutch farms, the farms in modern Sunset Park occupied long, narrow plots.

=== 19th century ===
==== Early growth and transit hub ====
Brooklyn became urbanized in the 19th century, with many people choosing to live in Brooklyn and commute to Manhattan, and residential development started spreading outward from Brooklyn Heights. Present-day Sunset Park, several miles away from Brooklyn Heights, was still primarily agricultural in the 1830s and remained that way until the middle of the 19th century. Among the few houses in the region was the Kent Castle, a Gothic Revival villa on present-day 59th Street.

After Brooklyn was incorporated as a city in 1834, the Commissioners' Plan of 1839 was devised, a street plan that extended to South Brooklyn. What would become Sunset Park was incorporated into the Eighth Ward of the city of Brooklyn, which at the time was the city's least populous ward. Sunset Park did not have its own name until the 20th century; rather, the neighborhoods in southern Brooklyn, including Bay Ridge, Dyker Heights, Bensonhurst, and Bath Beach, were collectively referred to as a single area. (Note: According to the Brooklyn Daily Eagle, by the early 20th century, the term "South Brooklyn" had grown to encompass both modern-day Sunset Park and Bay Ridge, as well as the neighborhoods in southern Brooklyn such as Dyker Heights, Bensonhurst, and Bath Beach. It was also still used to refer to the historical territory of "South Brooklyn", north of 39th Street. In this article, "South Brooklyn" refers mainly to the latter.) The first major development in the region was Green-Wood Cemetery, which opened in 1840 near the boundary of South Brooklyn and Bay Ridge, and quickly became popular as a tourist attraction. By 1870, the first frame row houses were constructed in the Eighth Ward, ultimately replacing the detached wooden houses in the area.

Transit to South Brooklyn started with the 1846 establishment of a ferry service to the cemetery. The Brooklyn City Railroad, founded in 1853, started offering stagecoach service from Fulton Ferry to destinations such as Bay Ridge. Afterward, several excursion railroads were built from South Brooklyn to the resort areas of Coney Island, Brighton Beach, and Manhattan Beach. These included the Brooklyn, Bath and Coney Island Rail Road; the New York, Bay Ridge and Jamaica Railroad; and the New York and Sea Beach Railroad. A ferry pier and railroad terminal, popular as a transfer point for those traveling to Coney Island, was built in the 1870s. The 39th Street Ferry started traveling to the Battery Maritime Building in Manhattan in 1887, followed two years later by the opening of the Fifth Avenue elevated train line in the neighborhood. Following the establishment of the ferry, the Eighth Ward finally became a desirable place to live.

==== Increasing residential development ====
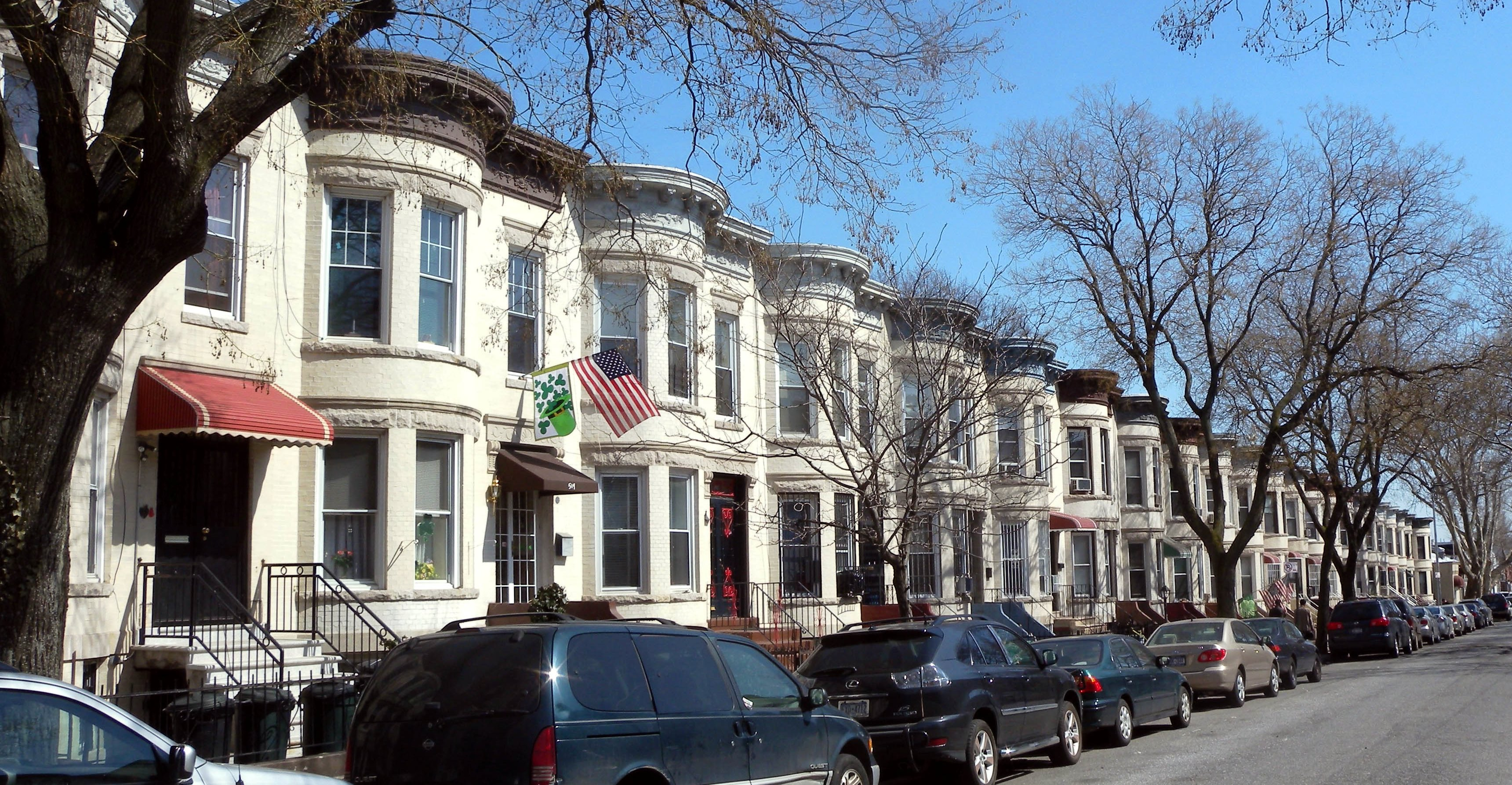
62nd Street and Fifth Avenue

After the establishment of transport to the Eighth Ward, the region began to quickly develop as a residential neighborhood, with the first speculatively-developed houses being built in the mid-1880s. (Note: According to the National Park Service, the first speculative house in Sunset Park was built in 1883, but is not part of the Sunset Park Historic District. The first speculative house to be built as part of the district was built in 1887. However, earlier houses may also exist.) In 1888, landowners delivered "a petition for local improvements" to be effected upon some 7,500 lots located from Third to Ninth Avenues between 39th and 65th Streets, which were estimated to be worth about $1 million (equivalent to $35,833,000 in 2025). The landowners requested that sewers be installed, and that the streets be paved and opened. The bill was passed the next year with minor changes. By August 1890, the Brooklyn commissioners were opening several streets in South Brooklyn. This was followed by the provision of funding for water mains in October 1890, and a similar act for gas mains in 1892. South Brooklyn's development was also helped by the conversion of the Third Avenue stagecoach line to a steam-powered route. The conversion occurred in spite of several opponents, who argued that steam engines would spook horses.

Most of the initial housing stock was centered around Fourth and Fifth Avenues. Further development was hindered by the area's steep and irregular topography, which resulted in some lots being higher than the streets they were located on. This could be seen in the proposed southward expansion of the Fifth Avenue elevated, which faced elevation changes of up to 90 feet if it was to continue southward along the same elevation. This would be remedied by rerouting the elevated to Third Avenue south of 38th Street. The Brooklyn Daily Eagle wrote in 1893 that one could "find lands that are now vacant covered with dwellings and factories, broken and uneven and uninviting paths transformed into broad avenues lined with stores and people in them. Buildings are going up with great rapidity—not singly or rarely so, but by blocks." The extension of the Fifth Avenue elevated opened to a 65th Street terminal on Third Avenue (with connections to Bay Ridge streetcar lines) on October 1, 1893.

Development in South Brooklyn continued even though the Panic of 1893 had resulted in the stoppage of nearly all developments in the rest of Brooklyn. Due to the large number of residential developments being built in South Brooklyn, in 1893 the Brooklyn city government banned the erection of wood-framed structures between Fourth and Fifth Avenues south of 39th Street. By 1895, the Brooklyn Daily Eagle noted, "Probably no ward in the city has been built up as rapidly as the Eighth Ward." Two-story on basement row houses were the most common building class to be erected in modern-day Sunset Park in the 1900s and 1910s due to their wide appeal, with the majority of these being two-family homes. On the avenues, row houses were built with commercial space on the ground floor, and the residential units were located above. The Eagle said in 1901 that two-family houses were "particularly attractive to people who desire comparatively small apartments, but who object to living in flats, and they appeal to this class on account of their being more quiet, and possibly, more exclusive." A notable exception to this was the group of single-family homes in central Sunset Park, though these were also easy to build.

==== Major projects ====
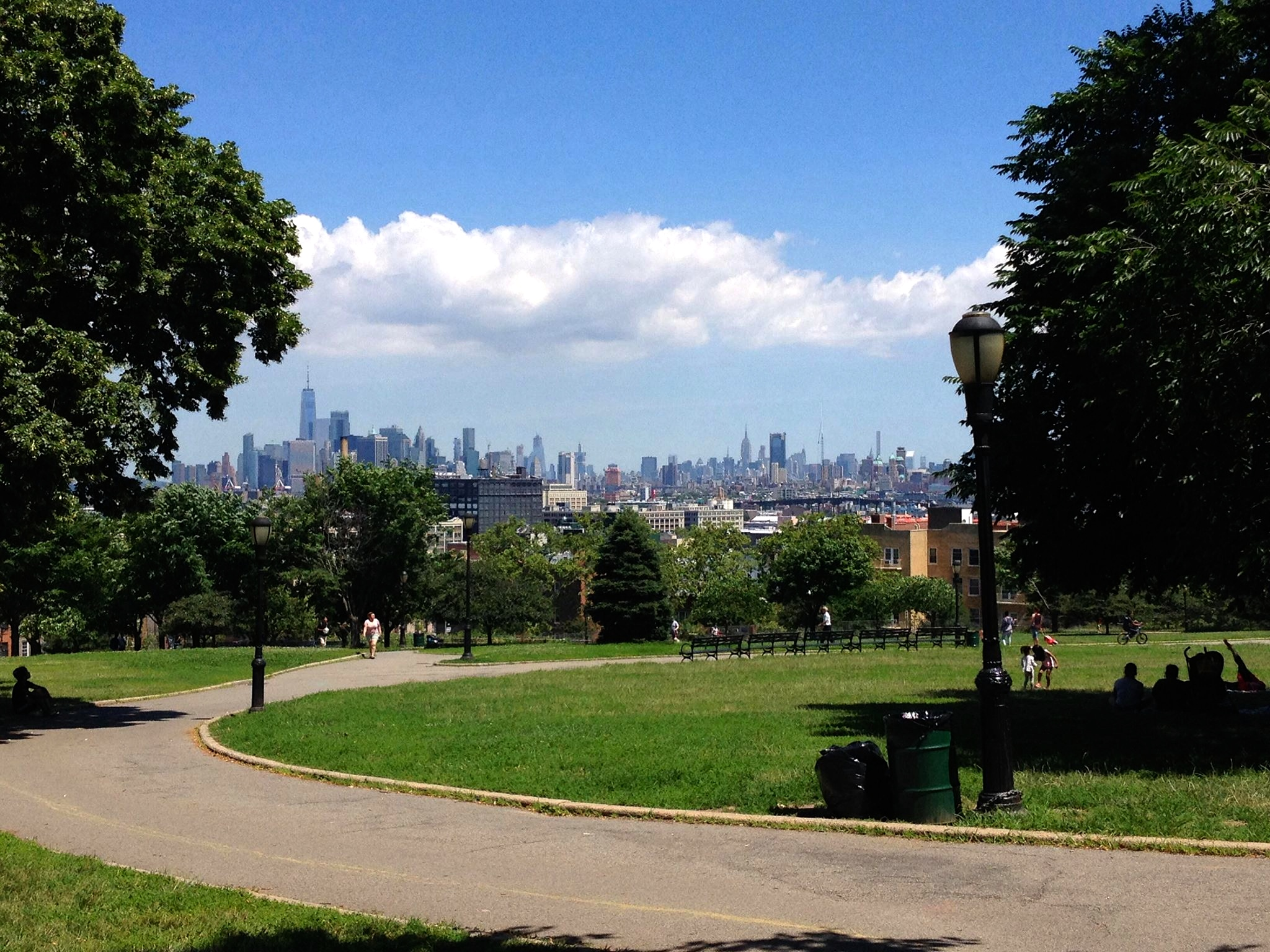
Sunset Park, the park after which the neighborhood is named

The growth of the Eighth Ward was helped by the development of Sunset Park, a public park initially bounded by Fifth and Seventh Avenues between 41st and 43rd Streets. The city of Brooklyn acquired the land in 1891 as part of its plan to build several parks citywide. The park would be expanded southward to 44th Street in 1904. The park was so named because its elevated location provided views of the sunset to the west. Though development of the park was precluded by its irregular topography, nevertheless it became a popular gathering place for Bay Ridge and South Brooklyn residents. Residential construction boomed in the late 19th and early 20th century amid real estate speculation initiated by the construction of the park and the Fifth Avenue elevated line. By 1909, there was significant development in the area surrounding the park, and the immediate surrounding area became known as "Sunset Park" as well.

Growth of the neighborhood also came with the development of the South Brooklyn waterfront. At the time, it was sparsely developed; there had only been one warehouse on the waterfront in 1890. The land contained an oil refinery belonging to the Bush & Denslow company of Rufus T. Bush. Standard Oil bought this refinery in the 1880s and dismantled it, but after Rufus T. Bush's death in 1890, his son Irving T. Bush bought the land back. Irving Bush built six warehouses on the site between 1895 and 1897, but soon observed their inefficiency, and instead devised plans for Bush Terminal, a combined shipping/warehousing complex between 32nd and 51st Streets. Construction began in 1902, and was completed in stages between 1911 and 1926. It was dubbed "Bush's Folly" at the time of its construction, as people had a hard time believing it could compete with the port of Manhattan.

=== Early 20th century ===
==== Subway construction ====
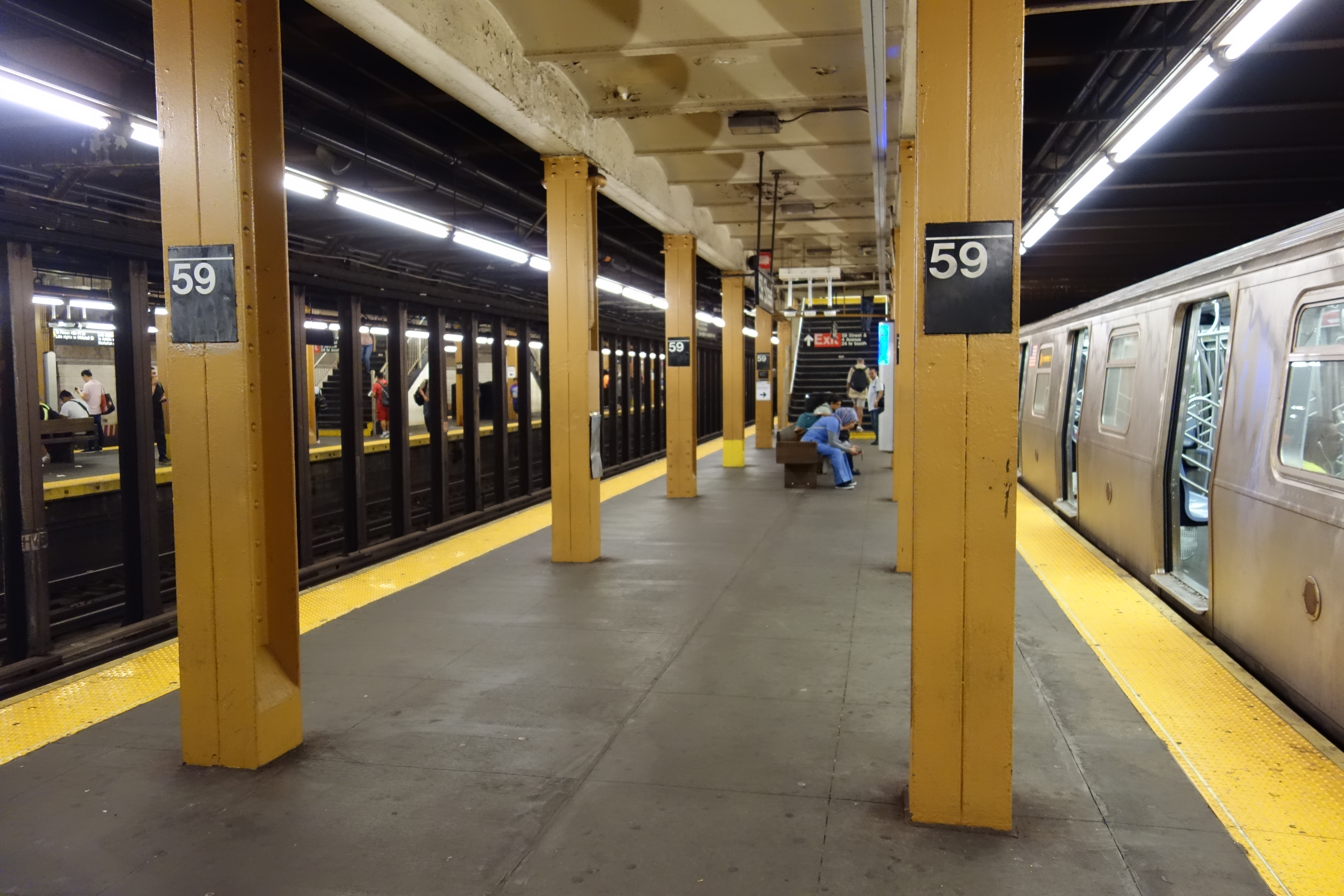
The 59th Street station, one of the stations on the Fourth Avenue subway that is located within Sunset Park. The line and station opened in 1915.

A building boom in South Brooklyn started in about 1902 and 1903, and thousands of people started coming to the area from Manhattan and from other places. The first definite plans for a Fourth Avenue subway (today's R train) were proposed by Rapid Transit Commission engineer William Barclay Parsons in 1903, and two years later, a citizens' committee was created to aid the creation of the subway line. The announcement of the subway line resulted in the immediate development of row houses in Sunset Park and Bay Ridge. In 1905 and 1906 realty values increased by about 100 percent, and land values increased due to the promise of improved transportation access. Such was the rate of development, houses were being sold before they were even completed, and land prices could rise significantly just within several hours.

The subway itself faced delays. In 1905, the Rapid Transit Commission adopted the Fourth Avenue route to Fort Hamilton; following approval by the Board of Estimate and mayor of New York City, the route was approved by the Appellate Division of the Supreme Court. Bids for construction and operation were let, but in 1907, the Rapid Transit Commission was succeeded by the Public Service Commission (PSC). For much of 1908, there were legal disagreements about whether the project could be funded while remaining within the city's debt limit. The PSC voted unanimously for the Fourth Avenue subway line in March 1908, but the Board of Estimate did not approve contracts for the line until October 1909. By then, a non-partisan political body, with the backing of 25,000 South Brooklyn residents, was created that would only support candidates in the municipal election that pledged support for the Fourth Avenue subway.

Groundbreaking for the first section of the subway, between DeKalb Avenue and 43rd Street, took place in 1909. Not long after the contracts were awarded, the PSC started negotiating with the Brooklyn Rapid Transit Company and the Interborough Rapid Transit Company in the execution of the Dual Contracts, which were signed in 1913. During the Dual System negotiations, the construction of an extension of the Fourth Avenue subway was recommended as part of the Dual System, which was approved in 1912. Construction began on the sections between 61st–89th Streets and between 43rd–61st Streets in 1913, and was completed two years later. The line opened to 59th Street on June 21, 1915, except the 45th Street and 53rd Street stations, which opened on September 22, 1915. A Real Estate Record and Guide article from the time said: "All along the line of the railroads there are plainly visible the result of the advertising of the contracts for the construction of the 4th av [sic] subway."

==== Middle-class residents ====
Though many row house districts in New York City housed wealthy professionals and businesspeople, Sunset Park was developed as a middle-class area, with most residents being either mid-level professionals (such as clerks and bookkeepers) or skilled tradespeople, including carpenters and plumbers. At the time, row houses were falling out of favor with the upper class, which had started gravitating toward detached single-family homes in more suburban areas, notably exemplified by the garden city movement and the Prospect Park South and Ditmas Park developments in nearby Flatbush. With many examples clad in brownstone (a style that had largely become old-fashioned by the late 1890s) to evoke the grandeur of earlier neighborhoods, the row houses in Sunset Park were a viable option for middle-class families who could not afford to move to the suburbs or into single-family houses. The Brooklyn Daily Eagle wrote that "the general tendency seems to be to develop Greater South Brooklyn in such a way that families possessed of moderate incomes may there establish themselves...under conditions which will not put too heavy a strain on the purse". For the majority of two-family row houses in Sunset Park, which were speculatively developed for no specific tenants, the owner's family lived in one unit and rented the other out. Many row houses were extremely crowded, often housing ten or more people across both units. Other residences in Sunset Park were single units or apartment buildings.

While many of the first residents in southern Sunset Park were initially Irish, German, Italians or Eastern European Jews, by the 1910s there was a growing Scandinavian district. Portions of the neighborhood became known as "Finntown" and "Little Norway". Finntown is located in the northern part of modern Sunset Park, surrounding the park of the same name, bounded by 5th Avenue to the west and 8th Avenue to the east, 39th Street to the north and 45th Street to the south. The Finns brought with them the concept of cooperative housing, and the Alku and Alku Toinen apartment house at 816 43rd Street is said to be the first cooperative apartment building in New York City. The Norwegian community in Bay Ridge, the largest in the city, was mainly contentrated along Eighth Avenue, then known as "Lapskaus Boulevard", at its peak in World War II.

During the peak periods of construction in Sunset Park, hundreds of developers were involved with constructing row houses in the neighborhood; many were neighborhood residents or had offices in the area, and most were not formally trained as architects. Reflecting a longstanding builder-oriented business culture in Brooklyn, these developers often reused building designs that were easy to erect and advertise. The most prolific developer was Thomas Bennett, (Note: The National Park Service report (1988) also states that Bennett was the only developer in the Sunset Park Historic District about whom substantive information is known. However, later reports from the New York City Landmarks Preservation Commission in 2019 give details about other developers.) who lived in Sunset Park and designed at least 600 structures in the neighborhood. Alongside tenements and apartment houses stemming from the nationally prosperous 1914–1929 era, the area was characterized by "limestones and brownstones, as well and brick and wood rowhouses". Bush Terminal continued to grow through World War II. During the conflict, the adjacent Brooklyn Army Terminal (situated between 58th and 65th Streets) employed more than 10,000 civilians, handled 43,000,000 short tons (38,392,857.14 long tons; 39,008,943.82 t) of cargo, and was the point of departure for 3.5 million soldiers.

=== Decline ===
Slumlike conditions proliferated in the vicinity of First and Second Avenues as early as World War I, and the Great Depression forced some residents to take in boarders; at the time, 60 percent of Sunset Park's male residents belonged to trade unions. After the Depression, the western section of the neighborhood began to decline in earnest. This was due to "redlining" implemented after the Home Owners' Loan Corporation, a federal agency, released color-coded maps in the late 1930s, indicating which neighborhoods were "desirable" for investments and which neighborhoods should be avoided. Most of present-day Sunset Park was given a "C" rating, indicating a locale that was "definitely declining", while the waterfront on the western part of the neighborhood was given a "D" rating, the lowest possible rating. These ratings were, on the most part, unscientific and motivated by racial and ethnic discrimination. The HOLC contended that the brownstones and the newly built Sunset Park Play Center were positive attributes of the neighborhood, but that the overall rating of the area was revised downward due to its industrial uses and the high numbers of Italian immigrants east of Seventh Avenue.

A 1943 demographic study of New York City (co-published by four local newspapers as the New York City Market Analysis) assigned the Sunset Park moniker to an area largely corresponding to the neighborhood's contemporary boundaries, possibly marking its first use in a more generalized context beyond the residential area surrounding the park. While denoting the redlining-induced socioeconomic decline of the waterfront, it revealed that the uphill section was more affluent than other residential, white ethnic-dominated areas adjacent to the city's industrial and maritime economies. However, the rapid development of Sunset Park had forestalled the emergence of upper middle class apartment houses that took root in comparable neighborhoods throughout the early 20th century; coupled with the impact of the waterfront, Sunset Park's aggregate average and median household expenditures were more analogous to the redlined working class neighborhoods that had arisen in once-affluent areas following Brooklyn's consolidation into the City of Greater New York. The area also remained considerably poorer than adjacent districts with detached housing stock and the semi-suburban belt of south-central and southeastern Brooklyn neighborhoods primarily developed after consolidation. (Note: In the study, examples of white-dominated areas near industrial and maritime economies included South Brooklyn (encompassing contemporary Cobble Hill, Carroll Gardens, Gowanus and Red Hook), Williamsburg, and Greenpoint. Similar neighborhoods with upper middle class housing stock included Washington Heights, Greenwich Village, and Kensington, while working-class neighborhoods included Clinton Hill and Bedford–Stuyvesant. Adjacent neighborhoods with similar housing stock included western Bay Ridge and the summit of Dyker Heights, which was then regarded as southeastern Bay Ridge. Post-consolidation neighborhoods included Midwood and Marine Park.) Nevertheless, because of the historical prominence of owner-occupied housing in the area prior to the widespread emergence of cooperative housing in apartment-oriented neighborhoods, Sunset Park's homeownership rate was at least as high as some of the city's wealthiest communities.

The elevated Gowanus Parkway was constructed on the structure of the elevated BMT Third Avenue Line in 1941, despite protests by 500 residents. This resulted in the downfall of one of the neighborhood's main commercial arteries. With the rise of truck-based freight shipping and ports in New Jersey, as well as the decreasing importance of heavy industry in the northeastern United States, Sunset Park's shipping sector entered a period of decline after World War II. In 1945, Third Avenue was widened to ten lanes at the surface level to accommodate truck traffic to and from the Brooklyn–Battery Tunnel. This widening necessitated the removal of all industrial buildings and housing on the east side of the avenue, destroying the rest of the business district built around the Third Avenue Line. The four-lane Gowanus Parkway was replaced in the 1960s with a six-lane expressway of the same name to carry truck and car traffic to and from the Verrazzano–Narrows Bridge, which opened in 1964. During this period, Fourth Avenue's sidewalks were narrowed by roughly eight feet to further accommodate vehicular traffic.

Third Avenue and the waterfront district soon evolved into a haven for prostitution and drug use, a milieu evoked by Hubert Selby Jr. in Last Exit to Brooklyn (1964). According to longtime resident and community activist Tony Giordano, the Scandinavian population coexisted with upwardly mobile Irish and Italians who had moved from less desirable parts of South Brooklyn, such as Gowanus and western Park Slope. While this influx would influence the community's businesses and religious institutions for decades, many of these residents proved to be transient amid redlining-driven white flight to adjoining areas (including Bay Ridge, Staten Island, and inner suburbs in the New York metropolitan area), leading to the increasing prominence of the neighborhood's Puerto Rican community. Though Sunset Park had a small Puerto Rican community centered around the maritime trades as early as the 1920s, it grew rapidly in the 1950s and 1960s when urban renewal projects in Manhattan pushed them away from longstanding enclaves on the Upper West Side, East Harlem and the Lower East Side. The neighborhood was particularly desirable because it still retained a large number of industrial jobs on the waterfront, to the west of Third Avenue. However, the closure of the Brooklyn Army Terminal in 1966 and general downsizing at Bush Terminal would negatively affect the nascent community. Collectively, over 30,000 jobs were eliminated as a result of industrial closures in Sunset Park between the 1950s and the 1970s.

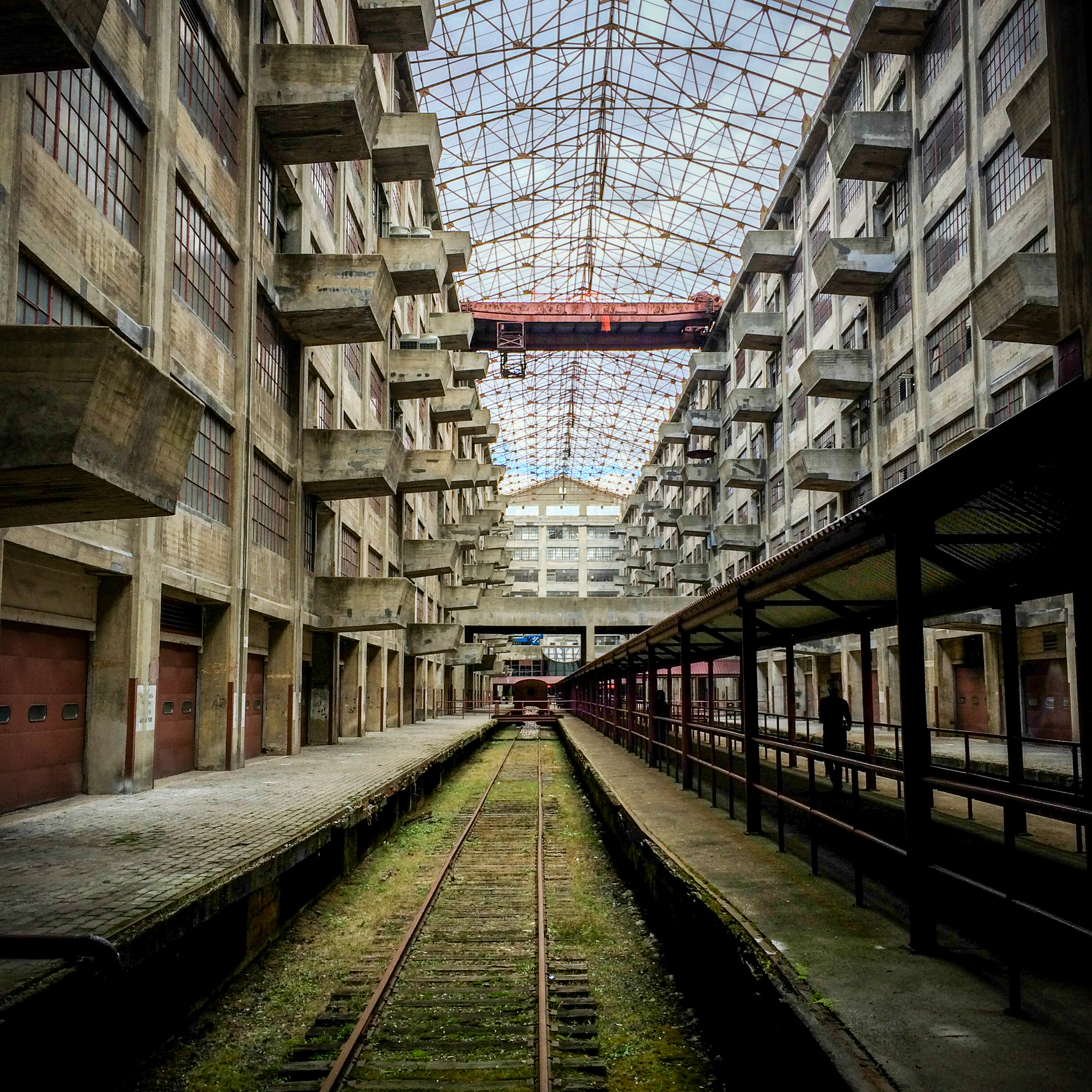
Interior of Brooklyn Army Terminal (2015)

As families who had lived in the area for decades began moving out, the housing stock lost value. Most of the housing inventory in the waterfront district failed to comply with a 1961 zoning resolution that subjected 2,000 residences to "rigid prohibitions against reconstruction [...], improvements [or] certain kinds of repairs"; this rapidly hastened predatory blockbusting practices. In The Power Broker, the 1974 biography of urban planner Robert Moses, author Robert Caro noted that elements of blight extended to the comparatively affluent, brownstone-dominated tracts between Fourth and Sixth Avenues by the 1960s.

=== Redevelopment ===
==== Late 20th century ====
Prior to the 1960s, much of the modern-day Sunset Park neighborhood was considered part of Bay Ridge, except for the area around the park itself, belying Sunset Park's origins as a ward of the city of Brooklyn and Bay Ridge's evolution from the Yellow Hook district of the town of New Utrecht, which remained independent from the city until 1894. According to Tony Giordano, more affluent residents of southern Bay Ridge considered the "tough" neighborhood to be somewhat distinct from their community, often characterizing the district as "Lower Bay Ridge", while many residents of Sunset Park "wished they lived in the richer Bay Ridge and enjoyed using the name on their own". Following a 1966 petition drive, Sunset Park was formally designated as a poverty area under the aegis of the Office of Economic Opportunity. As part of this process, it received its current moniker and boundaries. With aid from federal, state, and local agencies, Sunset Park slowly began redeveloping. Major factors included the purchase of Bush Terminal by new investors in 1963 and its conversion into an industrial park; the gradual loosening of the 1961 zoning regulations; and the expansion of Lutheran Medical Center to the waterfront American Machine and Foundry factory in the 1970s.

However, due to collusion between the banking and real estate industries and actors in the Federal Housing Administration against the Puerto Rican community, hundreds of housing units were soon lost to abandonment. According to writer David Ment, beginning in the late 1960s, "real estate speculators often used [blockbusting] tactics to purchase homes, then obtained inflated appraisals and mortgage insurance from the [...] FHA." Even though these homes were renovated shoddily, they were sold to lower-income families who then went into foreclosure because of unaffordable maintenance costs. The speculators then collected the balance of the mortgage, which had been insured by the FHA; this resulted in several FHA officials and speculators being indicted for fraud, though by that time, "the resulting abandonment could not be reversed." According to Louis Winnick, over "200 small properties and 40 apartment buildings" remained abandoned as late as 1977, while "the blocks below (and often above) Fourth Avenue were defaced by the stigmata of dereliction."

The Sunset Park Redevelopment Committee, founded in 1969 to help the expansion of Lutheran Medical Center, started reclaiming some of the blighted homes, though to little success at first. An initial federal grant of $500,000 failed to effect a redevelopment. By the early 1980s, people were willing to move to Sunset Park due to its high number of affordable units. At that point, the Sunset Park Redevelopment Committee had renovated about 200 units and had federal funds for 333 more.

Another factor in the redevelopment of Sunset Park was the Immigration and Nationality Act of 1965, which removed racially-based restrictions on immigration to the United States, causing the area to be developed by new immigrants from Asia, Latin America, and the Caribbean. By the 1980s, other Latin American immigrants (including Dominican, Ecuadorian and Mexican Americans) had started populating Sunset Park. These new residents started improving formerly decrepit properties in Sunset Park. In addition, Chinese immigrants settled in the area in large numbers. Most of these people worked in service jobs such as garment factories or restaurants, but they were also able to buy homes and start their own companies. Author Tarry Hum stated that these residents' interest in Sunset Park row houses was "an important neighborhood amenity that … helped stem the area's decline".

By the 1980s, there was also interest in redeveloping Sunset Park as an industrial hub. The city government bought the Brooklyn Army Terminal in 1981, and renovated it for manufacturing use; the first industrial tenants signed leases for space in the terminal in 1987. Industry City was also successful, and was 98 percent occupied by 1980.

==== 21st century ====
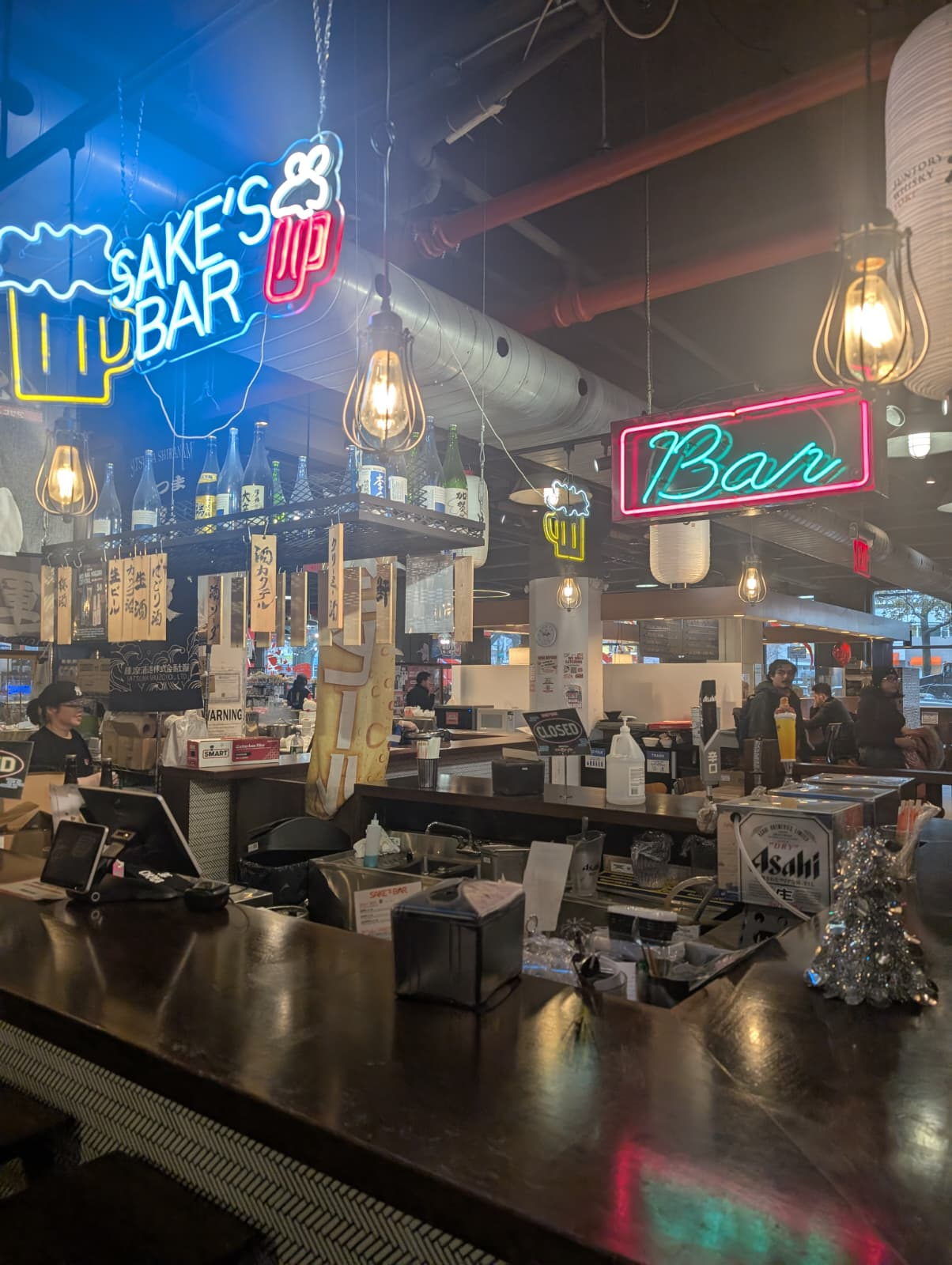
View of bar in Industry City's Japan Village, 2025

Following the 1966 poverty area designation, the area from 36th Street to the Prospect Expressway was incorporated into Sunset Park. As the gentrification of South Brooklyn accelerated in the 2000s, this area was rebranded as Greenwood Heights, or as South Slope.

The 2000s and 2010s brought new development to Sunset Park. In February 2016, Sunset Park West was one of four neighborhoods featured in an article in The New York Times about "New York's Next Hot Neighborhoods". Factors cited in the article included redevelopment along the waterfront in Industry City and Bush Terminal, the 2014 opening of Bush Terminal Park, and the use of warehouses as party and event spaces. According to real-estate sources, all of these business- and office-related activities will "drive residential momentum" in the western part of Sunset Park. Some in the neighborhood have expressed fears of the gentrification that could follow in the wake of these developments. Industry City's owners announced a $1 billion renovation plan in March 2015, while a "Made in NY" industrial campus was announced for Bush Terminal in 2017.

== Demographics ==
Sunset Park is divided into two neighborhood tabulation areas, Sunset Park West and Sunset Park East, which collectively comprise the population of Sunset Park. Based on data from the 2010 United States census, the population of Sunset Park was 126,381, a change of 7,919 (6.3%) from the 118,462 counted in 2000. Covering an area of 1,854.8 acres (750.6 ha), the neighborhood had a population density of 68.1 inhabitants per acre (43,600/sq mi; 16,800/km^{2}). The racial makeup of the neighborhood in 2023 was estimated to be 51.0% White, 3.0% Black, 15.3% Asian, and 26.2% Hispanic.

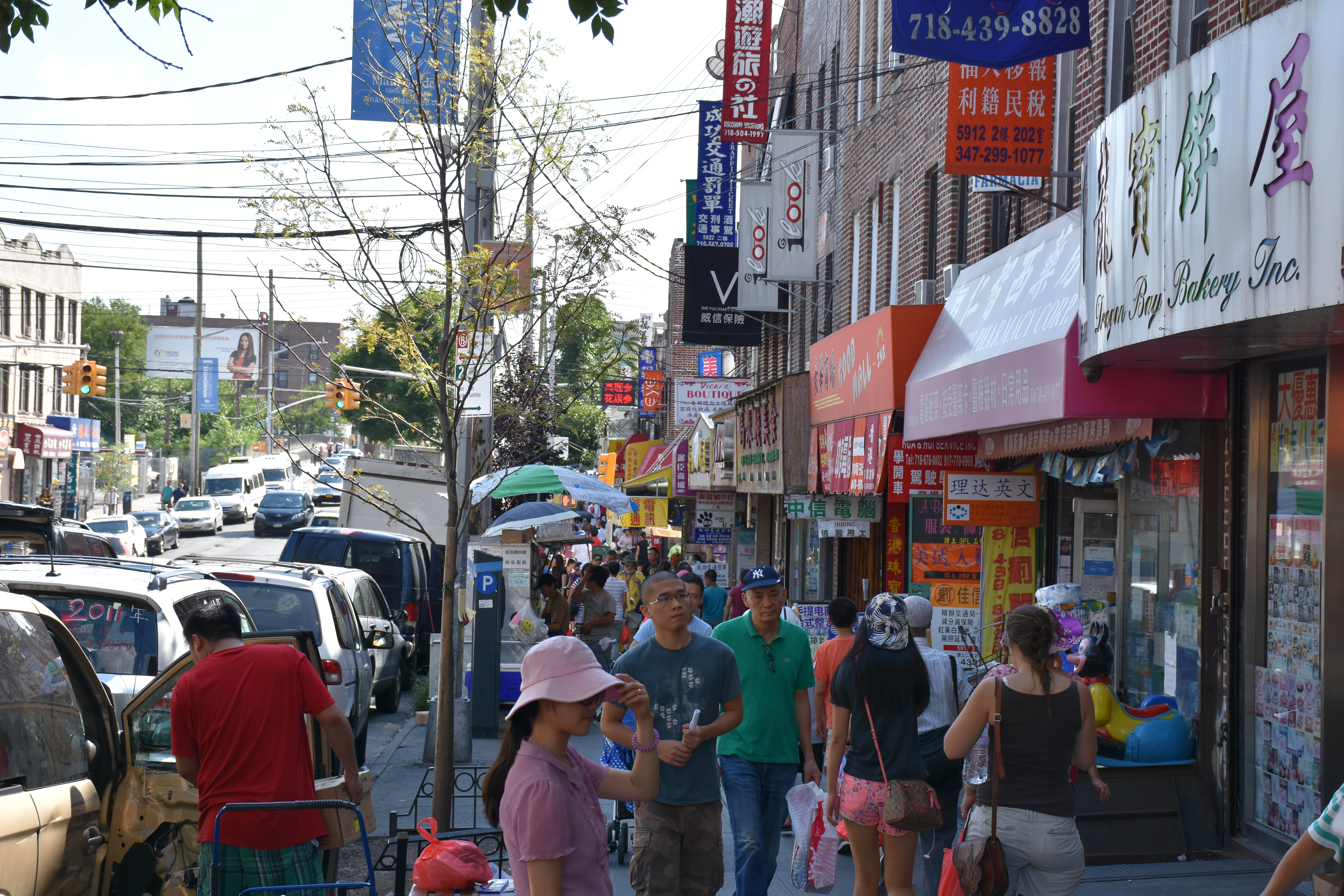
Eighth Avenue (Sunset Park East) in 2015, where many Chinese businesses within the neighborhood are concentrated

The entirety of Community Board 7 had 132,721 inhabitants as of NYC Health's 2018 Community Health Profile, with an average life expectancy of 82.6 years. This is higher than the median life expectancy of 81.2 for all New York City neighborhoods. Most inhabitants are middle-aged adults and youth: 22% are between the ages of 0 and 17, 39% between 25 and 44, and 21% between 45 and 64. The ratio of college-aged and elderly residents was lower, both at 9%.

As of 2016, the median household income in Community Board 7 was $56,787. In 2018, an estimated 29% of Sunset Park residents lived in poverty, compared to 21% in all of Brooklyn and 20% in all of New York City. One in twelve residents (8%) was unemployed, compared to 9% in the rest of both Brooklyn and New York City. Rent burden, or the percentage of residents who have difficulty paying their rent, is 57% in Sunset Park, higher than the citywide and boroughwide rates of 52% and 51% respectively. Based on this calculation, as of 2018, Sunset Park is considered to be gentrifying.

=== 2020 census ===
The 2020 census data from the New York City Department of City Planning is divided into three neighborhood tabulation areas: West Sunset Park, Central Sunset Park, and East Sunset Park–West Borough Park. West Sunset Park had 54,473 residents; Central Sunset Park, 55,606 residents; and East Sunset Park–West Borough Park, 35,632 residents.

The racial makeup of West Sunset Park was 56.2% (30,638) White, 5.0% (2,740) African American, 13.1% (7,139) Asian, 1.1% (597) from other races, and 2.4% (1,286) from two or more races. Hispanic or Latino of any race were 22.2% (12,073) of the population. The racial makeup of Central Sunset Park was 56.5% (31,444) White, 1.1% (610) African American, 8.1% (4,509) Asian, 0.5% (280) from other races, and 1.0% (537) from two or more races. Hispanic or Latino of any race were 32.8% (18,226) of the population. The racial makeup of East Sunset Park–West Borough Park was 54.7% (19,480) White, 1.8% (641) African American, 19.5% (6,959) Asian, 1.3% (471) from other races, and 1.5% (548) from two or more races. Hispanic or Latino of any race were 21.1% (7,533) of the population.

=== 2010 census ===
The racial makeup of the neighborhood was 46.4% (58,654) White, 2.3% (2,908) African American, 0.2% (195) Native American, 14.5% (18,321) Asian, 0% (32) Pacific Islander, 0.3% (335) from other races, and 1.1% (1,398) from two or more races. Hispanic or Latino of any race were 35.2% (44,538) of the population.

=== Ethnic groups ===
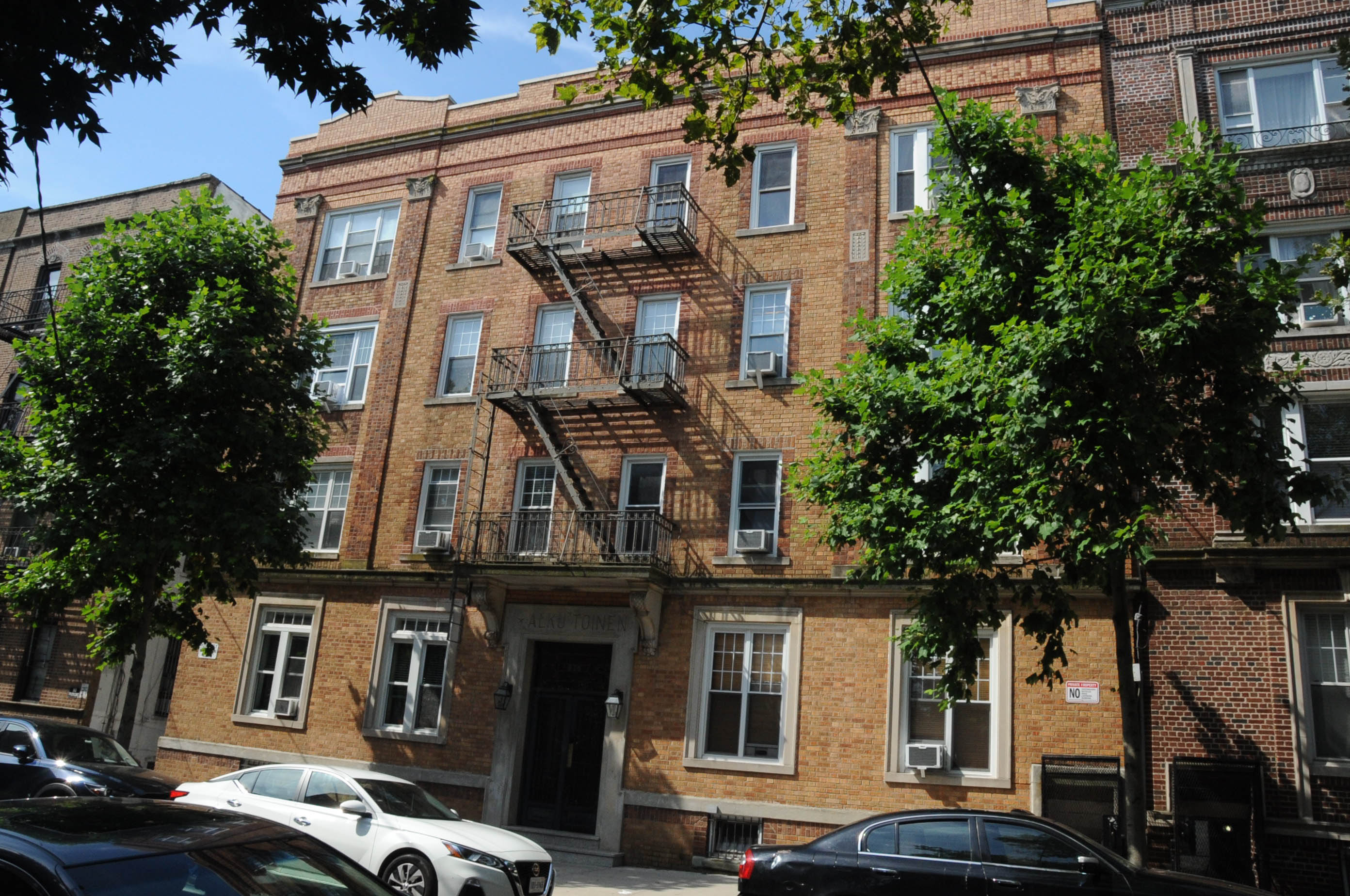
Alku Toinen, one of the cooperative apartment houses built by the Finnish community

Sunset Park's main population is made up of Europeans. The first major ethnic group to immigrate to the area in the 1840s was the Irish. This was followed by Nordic and Polish Americans in the late 19th century and by, Italians in the 20th century. In particular, Nordic immigrants are one of the largest ethnic groups in Sunset Park and Bay Ridge. The Norwegians, Swedes, and Danes are mostly maritime workers who settled near the waterfront, while Finns are mostly tenant farmers or non-landowning laborers. There was a second wave of Nordic migration into Sunset Park (and neighboring Bay Ridge) in the 1980s, which caused a resurgence in the neighborhood's Nordic population.

A prominent ethnic enclave in Sunset Park is Finntown, an enclave of Finnish immigrants in northern Sunset Park, which is composed of Finnish immigrants as well as small amounts of other Scandinavian groups. In the 1910s, Sunset Park had about 10,000 Finnish residents and at one point, it had its own Finnish language newspaper. In 1916, Finntown became the site of the first non-profit housing cooperative in the United States when the Finnish Home Building Association built two cooperative houses, named Alku and Alku Toinen (translated respectively to "Beginning" and "Beginning Second"), at 816 and 826 43rd Street. By 1922, the Finns had constructed twenty co-ops in Sunset Park. These initially catered primarily to the area's Finnish population, but others of European descent also live in these co-ops. In honor of the Finnish community that inhabited Sunset Park, a block of 40th Street, in front of the Imatra Society building at 740 40th Street, was co-named "Finlandia Street" in 1991.

During the 1950s and 1960s, Sunset Park saw an influx of Latin American and Asian immigrants. At first migrants came from Puerto Rico, and by the 1980s other Latin American immigrants including Cuban, Dominican, Ecuadorian, and Mexican Americans had started populating Sunset Park. By the 1980 United States census, 10% of the residents were Hispanic, compared with less than 5% in the 1970 United States census; meanwhile, the number of white residents had begun to decrease. The newer residents tended to be poorer, leading to claims of "de-gentrification".

In the 1980s, Sunset Park became the location of the borough's first Chinatown, which is located along Eighth Avenue roughly between 44th and 68th Streets. The avenue is lined with Chinese businesses, including grocery stores, restaurants, Buddhist temples, video stores, bakeries, community organizations, and a Hong Kong Supermarket. Like the Manhattan Chinatown (of which the Brooklyn Chinatown is an extension), Brooklyn's Chinatown was originally settled by Cantonese immigrants. In the 2000s, an influx of Fuzhou immigrants supplanted the Cantonese at a significantly faster rate than in Manhattan's Chinatown; this trend had slowed down by the end of the decade, with fewer Fuzhouese coming to Sunset Park each year. By 2009 many Mandarin speakers had moved to Sunset Park.

People from India (primarily hailing from the state of Gujarat's minority Christian communities) also started settling in and around Sunset Park in 1974. The ethnic diversity of the neighborhood is celebrated annually with the Parade of Flags down Fifth Avenue, which started in 1994. The core of the Hispanic population is west of Fifth Avenue, while the Norwegian population stretches between Fourth and Eighth Avenues south of 45th Street. The Chinese population straddles the area from Seventh Avenue eastward to Borough Park, one of Brooklyn's fastest-growing Chinatowns.

== Land use ==
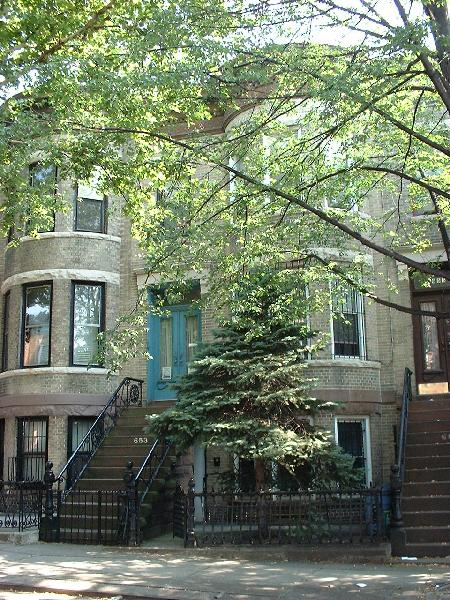
653 52nd Street

According to The Neighborhoods of Brooklyn, Sunset Park is bounded to the north by the Prospect Expressway and the Park Slope neighborhood, to the east by Ninth Avenue and the Borough Park neighborhood, to the south by 65th Street and the Bay Ridge neighborhood, and to the west by New York Harbor. The region north of 36th Street is also known as Greenwood Heights or South Slope.

The areas west of Third Avenue are zoned mostly for light industrial usage and as such, mainly contain factories, cargo storage and other industrial buildings. The areas east of Third Avenue, as well as a small area west of Third Avenue between 54th and 57th Streets, are zoned for low-rise residential buildings, including row houses and short apartment structures. Generally, commercial areas are restricted to the ground floors of buildings on Third, Fourth, Fifth, Seventh, and Eighth Avenues. Light industrial zoning is also present south of 61st and 62nd Streets.

=== Residential stock ===
The neighborhood's "brownstone belt" includes homes with brownstone, sandstone, limestone, iron, and ornamental stone-brick facades, though the majority of homes in Sunset Park are faced with brick. Developed mostly between 1892 and 1910 following earlier frame house development, it is dominated by two-story-above-basement, bayed row houses that were envisaged as "inexpensive imitations of the stately four- and five-story townhouses [...] of Brooklyn Heights, Carroll Gardens, Fort Greene and Park Slope." Though their facades were analogous to the less expensive tier of one-family row houses elsewhere in Brooklyn, (Note: The row houses evoked contemporaneous developments in Bedford–Stuyvesant, the Prospect Lefferts Gardens section of Flatbush, and Crown Heights.) most of these structures were in fact built as two-family residences. In addition, several low-rise apartment buildings were erected in the late 19th and early 20th centuries. The row houses and apartment buildings were both intended for the neighborhood's middle-class residents. The two-family row houses came in two types. The cheaper row houses contained an undesignated English basement and one unit on each of the first (or stoop-level) and second floors. More expensive row houses had a subterranean cellar, raised, ground-level basement and first (or parlor) floor as a single triplex unit, and the second floor as another unit.

Although many row houses have shed internal architectural elements of the era, they continue to encompass a substantial swath of the residential stock between Fourth and Sixth Avenues south of 40th Street. However, brownstone rows exist as far north as 420-424 36th Street and as far east as 662 56th Street, while several bayed brick rows (notably exemplified by 240-260 45th Street) are situated south of Fourth Avenue, where wood frame and frame-brick houses dating from the earliest development in the area remain prevalent. While these houses retained their polychrome facades and other Victorian-era design flourishes (akin to the "painted ladies" of San Francisco) as late as 1940, most have been clad in vinyl siding and Formstone for decades.

In addition, there are numerous multi-family residences in Sunset Park. Some of these residences are three-family homes, spread across three stories, similar in design to the neighborhood's row houses. Others are small four- or five-story apartments with multiple dwellings, similar to tenements. Many of the Finnish-built cooperative apartment buildings contained open courts within them. Along Fourth and Fifth Avenue, there are several buildings with commercial space on their ground floors and residential units above.

=== Official landmarks ===
==== City landmarks ====
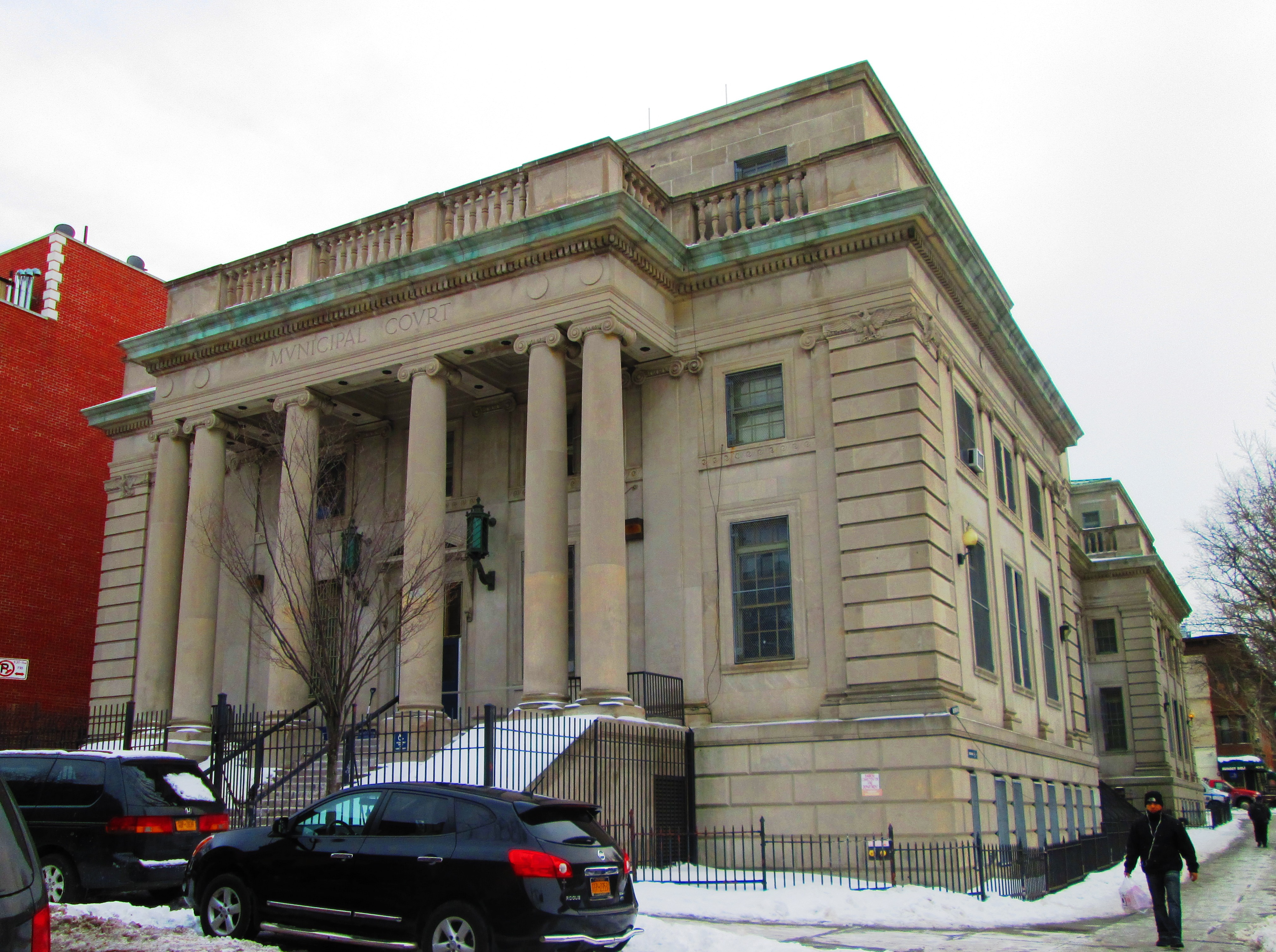
Sunset Park Courthouse, a New York City Landmark

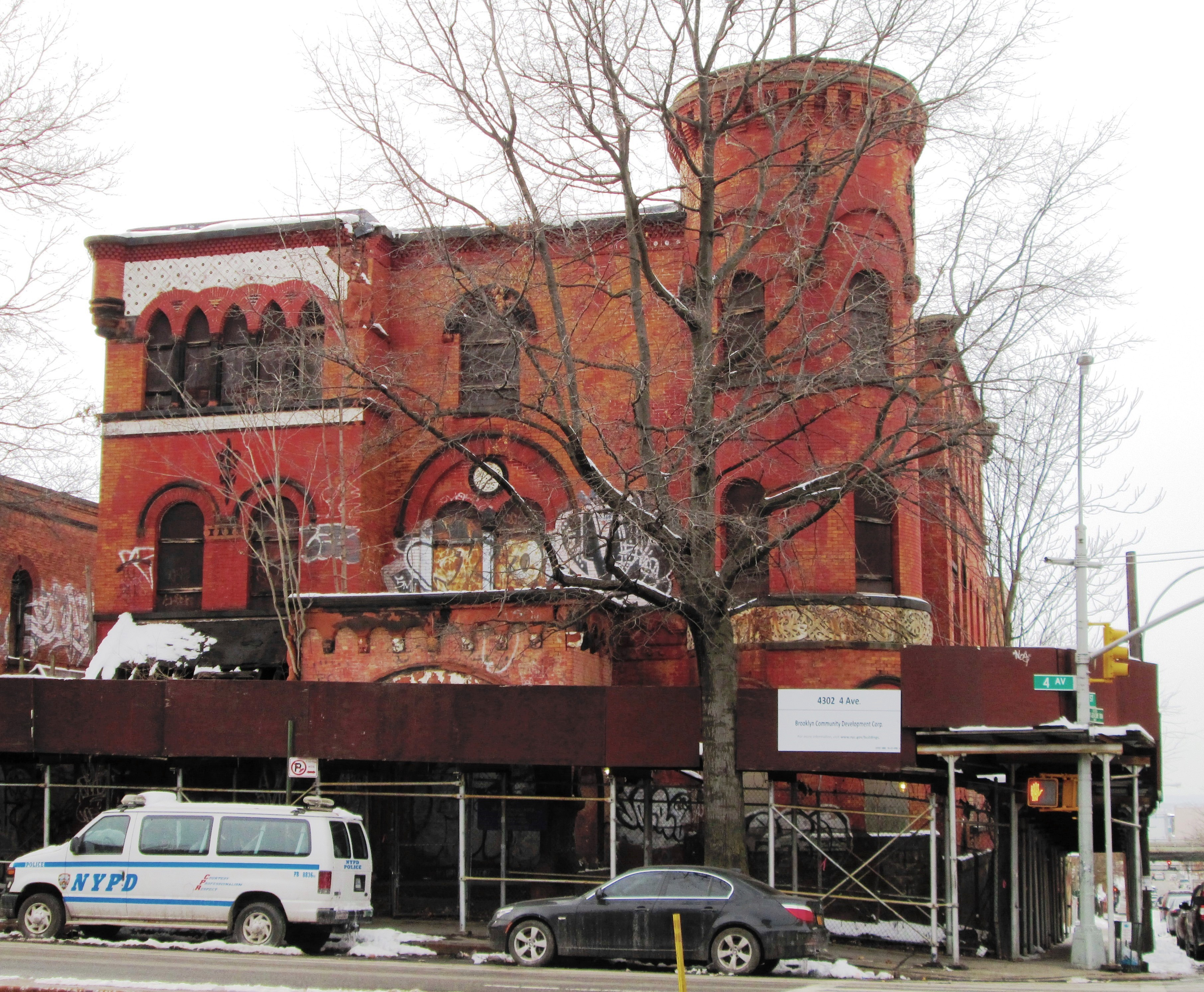
Former 18th Police Precinct Station House and Stable, a New York City Landmark

The neighborhood has several individual landmarks designated by the New York City Landmarks Preservation Commission:

- Dr. Maurice T. Lewis House, designed by R. Thomas Short of the prominent Manhattan architectural firm Harde & Short, and built in 1907 for Lewis, a physician and president of the nearby Bay Ridge Savings Bank. It is one of Short's few projects outside of Manhattan and the neighborhood's only freestanding mansion, serving as Lewis's home until his death in 1931. From 1931 to 1996, the building was owned by Sonya Monen, the first female physician to serve in the United States Coast Guard Reserve's SPARS division (as a lieutenant commander) during World War II.
- Sunset Park Courthouse, built in 1930–1931 in the Neoclassical style.
- Former 18th Police Precinct Station House and Stable, a three-story brick Romanesque Revival building built in 1892 and formerly used by the New York City Police Department's 68th Precinct.
- The 228th Engine Company fire station, a two-story Romanesque Revival building built for the Brooklyn Fire Department in 1891, and later used by the New York City Fire Department when the two departments were merged in 1898.
- The Sunset Park Play Center, a neoclassical/Art Deco structure built in 1936.
- Several individual portions of Green-Wood Cemetery are city landmarks, including the main gate at 25th Street as well as the cemetery's chapel.

Four residential historic districts were designated by the Landmarks Preservation Commission in June 2019:

- Sunset Park South Historic District, a set of over 280 two-story-and-basement row houses along 54th through 59th Streets between Fourth and Fifth Avenues, constructed between 1892 and 1906. The houses are in several architectural styles, including Queen Anne, Renaissance Revival, Romanesque Revival, and neo-Grec.
- Sunset Park 50th Street Historic District, a set of 50 row houses along 50th Street between Fourth and Fifth Avenues. These were constructed by the Waldron Brothers in 1897–1898.
- Central Sunset Park Historic District, a set of over 140 two-family houses along 47th and 48th Streets between Fifth and Sixth Avenues. Catered toward the middle class and designed in the Renaissance Revival style, they were built starting in 1892.
- Sunset Park North Historic District, a set of 50 two-family houses and some four-story flats on the south side of 44th Street between Fifth and Seventh Avenues. The two-story houses are Renaissance Revival buildings constructed between 1903 and 1908, while the flats were constructed between 1910 and 1914.

==== National Register of Historic Places listings ====
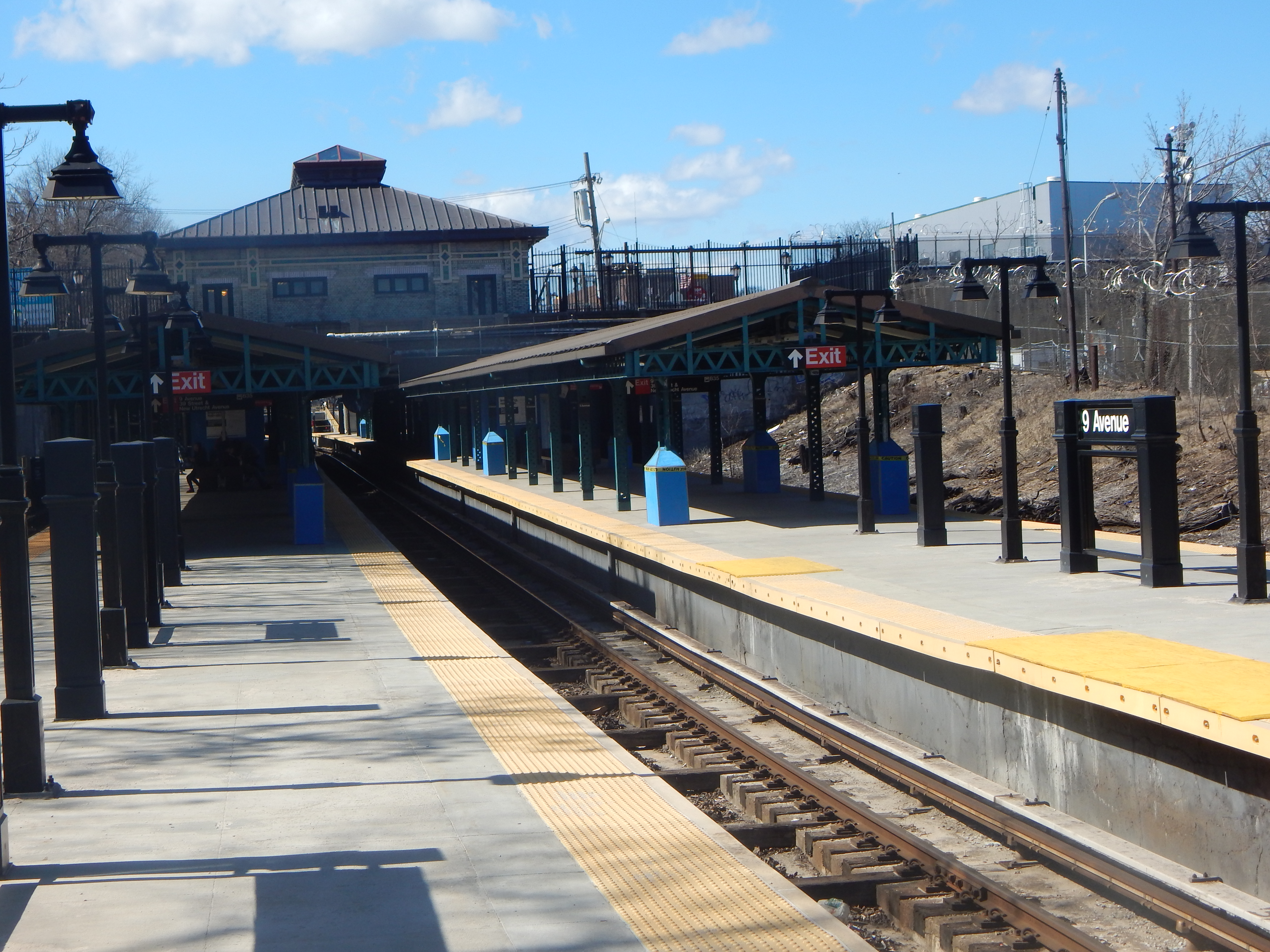
Ninth Avenue station, listed on the National Register of Historic Places

A portion of the neighborhood is listed on the National Register of Historic Places (NRHP) as a historic district, known for its Romanesque and Renaissance Revival architecture. It is the largest historic district on the NRHP in the Northeast United States. The Brooklyn Army Terminal, a massive former warehousing complex converted into an industrial park, is located west of Second Avenue between 59th and 65th Streets and is individually listed on the NRHP. At its construction in 1919, it was the world's largest concrete building complex.

The former 18th Police Precinct Station House and Stable is also on the NRHP in addition to being a city landmark. Other NRHP listings include the Ninth Avenue station, the Alku and Alku Toinen buildings, and the Fourth Avenue Methodist Episcopal Church. Additionally, within the portion of Greenwood Heights that overlaps with Sunset Park, the entirety of Green-Wood Cemetery is a National Historic Landmark, and the Storehouse No. 2, U.S. Navy Fleet Supply Base and the Weir Greenhouse are NRHP sites.

=== Power and waste infrastructure ===
Two power stations are located in Sunset Park near the waterfront. One is the Narrows Generating Station, located at 53rd Street, which is capable of producing 297 to 320 megawatts (398,000 to 429,000 hp). The station was proposed for replacement in the late 2010s. The other is the Gowanus Generating Station, located at Third Avenue and 28th Street, capable of producing 572 to 640 megawatts (767,000 to 858,000 hp). A temporary power plant was established at Third Avenue and 23rd Street in 2001, consisting of two 44-megawatt (59,000 hp) natural gas turbines.

There are two solid waste transfer plants and a sanitation garage in Sunset Park. The Hamilton Avenue Marine Transfer Station at 15th Street and Hamilton Avenue opened in 2017, and IESI NY Corporation also operates a waste transfer station at First Avenue and 50th Street. The New York City Department of Sanitation operates a garage, shared by trucks serving Brooklyn Community Districts 7 and 10, (Note: Sanitation garages serve sanitation districts, which correspond largely to community districts.) at First Avenue and 51st Street.

=== Other points of interest ===
Industry City, formerly Bush Terminal, is a complex of warehouses on the waterfront between 32nd and 51st Streets. It was originally operated by Irving Bush as a massive industrial complex, and was built in phases through 1926. Between 32nd and 41st Streets, a private consortium operates 6,000,000 square feet (560,000 m^{2}) of commercial light manufacturing space. The section between 40th and 51st Streets is operated by the New York City Economic Development Corporation (NYCEDC) as a garment manufacturing complex. Adjacent to Bush Terminal is the former factory of the National Metal Company on First Avenue and 42nd Street, built c. 1890 and distinguished by its Neo-Gothic tower. The South Brooklyn Marine Terminal, an intermodal shipping, warehousing, and manufacturing complex, is located west of Industry City between 29th and 39th Streets.

There were previously two additional military structures in Sunset Park. The New York State Arsenal, on Second Avenue between 63rd and 64th Streets, was built in 1925 as an ordnance storage facility and later became a self-storage warehouse. The Second Battalion Naval Militia Armory on 5100 First Avenue, between 51st and 52nd Streets, was built in 1903 or 1904, and was demolished in the 1970s to make way for a post office.

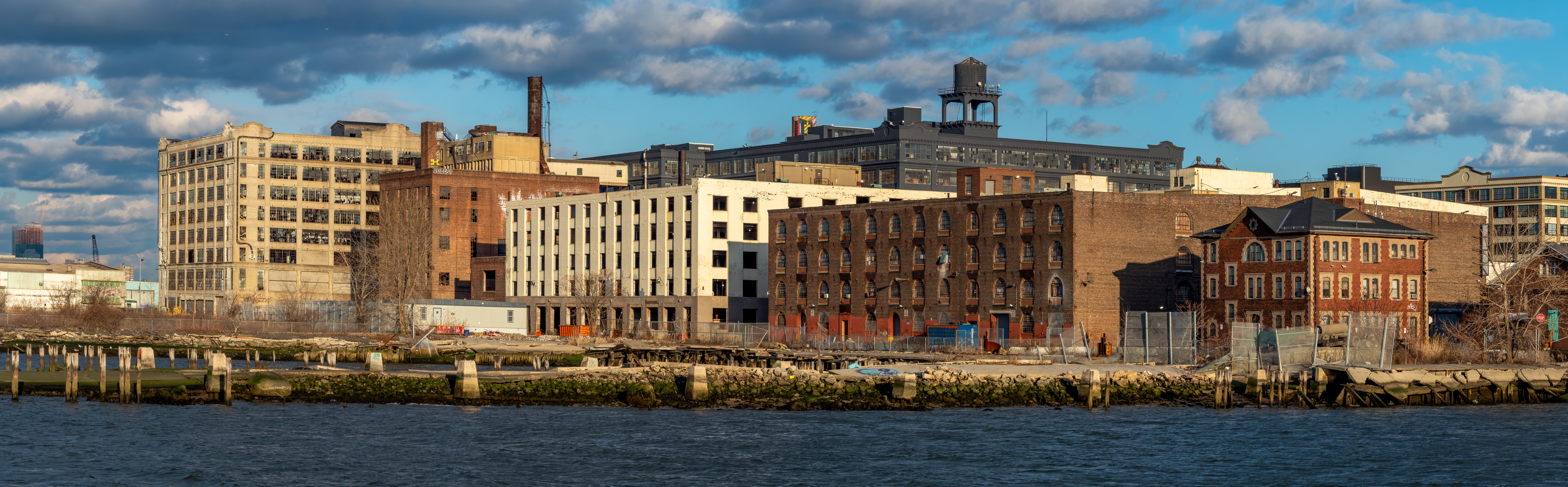
Sunset Park as seen from the waterfront

== Police and crime ==
Sunset Park is patrolled by the 72nd Precinct of the NYPD, located at 830 Fourth Avenue. The 72nd Precinct ranked 16th safest out of 69 patrol areas for per-capita crime in 2010. Total crime has decreased since the 1990s, and the 72nd Precinct is one of the safest precincts in Brooklyn as of 2010. As of 2018, with a non-fatal assault rate of 37 per 100,000 people, Sunset Park's rate of violent crimes per capita is less than that of the city as a whole. The incarceration rate of 289 per 100,000 people is lower than that of the city as a whole.

The 72nd Precinct has a lower crime rate than in the 1990s, with crimes across all categories having decreased by 79.1% between 1990 and 2018. The precinct reported 2 murders, 32 rapes, 185 robberies, 209 felony assaults, 153 burglaries, 468 grand larcenies, and 77 grand larcenies auto in 2018.

== Fire safety ==
The New York City Fire Department (FDNY) operates two fire stations and one EMS station in Sunset Park Engine Company 201/Ladder Company 114/Battalion 40, located at 5113 Fourth Avenue, was built in 2009 by Rothzeid Kaizerman and Bee. Engine Company 228 (formerly Engine Company 28), located at 436 39th Street, is an official city landmark. In addition, EMS Station 40 is located at 5011 Seventh Avenue.

== Health ==
As of 2018, preterm births and births to teenage mothers are less common in Sunset Park than in other places citywide. In Sunset Park, there were 27 preterm births per 1,000 live births (compared to 87 per 1,000 citywide), and 7.9 births to teenage mothers per 1,000 live births (compared to 19.3 per 1,000 citywide). Sunset Park has a relatively high population of residents who are uninsured, or who receive healthcare through Medicaid. In 2018, this population of uninsured residents was estimated to be 22%, which is higher than the citywide rate of 12%.

The concentration of fine particulate matter, the deadliest type of air pollutant, in Sunset Park is 0.0085 milligrams per cubic metre (8.5×10^{−9} oz/ft^{3}), higher than the citywide and boroughwide averages. Twelve percent of Sunset Park residents are smokers, which is slightly lower than the city average of 14% of residents being smokers. In Sunset Park, 24% of residents are obese, 11% are diabetic, and 27% have high blood pressure—compared to the citywide averages of 24%, 11%, and 28% respectively. In addition, 18% of children are obese, compared to the citywide average of 20%.

Eighty-seven percent of residents eat some fruits and vegetables every day, which is equal to the city's average of 87%. In 2018, 74% of residents described their health as "good", "very good", or "excellent", less than the city's average of 78%. For every supermarket in Sunset Park, there are 45 bodegas.

There are several hospitals and medical clinics in the Sunset Park area, the largest of which is NYU Langone Hospital – Brooklyn. Maimonides Medical Center is located in nearby Borough Park.

== Political representation ==
Politically, Sunset Park is in New York's 10th congressional district, represented by Dan Goldman. In the New York State Senate, Sunset Park is in two districts: the 26th and 17th Districts; represented by Democrat Andrew Gounardes and Republican Steve Chan. In the New York State Assembly, Sunset Park is in the 49th and 51st districts, represented respectively by Republican Lester Chang and Democrat Marcela Mitaynes. Sunset Park is also in the New York City Council's 38th, 39th, and 43rd districts, represented respectively by Alexa Avilés, Shahana Hanif and Susan Zhuang.

== Post offices and ZIP Codes ==
Sunset Park is served by two ZIP Codes: most of the neighborhood south of 44th Street is part of 11220 while Industry City and the area north of 44th Street is within 11232. The United States Post Office operates the Sunset Station at 6102 Fifth Avenue, the Bay Ridge Station at 5501 Seventh Avenue, and the Bush Terminal Station at 900 Third Avenue.

== Green space ==
There are several public parks in Sunset Park, which are operated by the New York City Department of Parks and Recreation.

=== Sunset Park ===
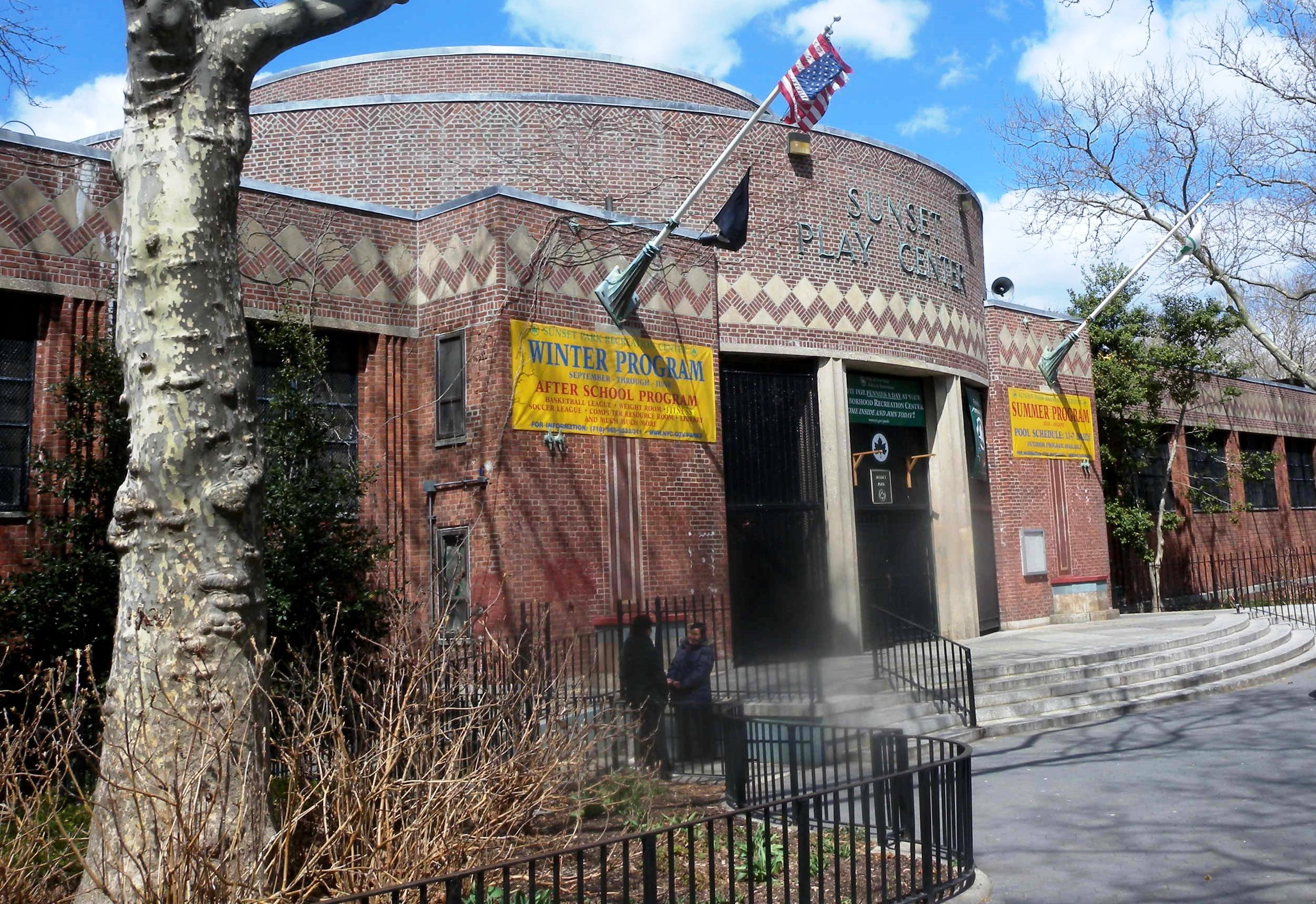
The landmark Sunset Play Center

Sunset Park's namesake is a 24.5-acre (9.9 ha) public park located between 41st and 44th Streets and Fifth and Seventh Avenues. The park's elevated location offers views of New York Harbor; Manhattan; the Statue of Liberty; and, more distantly, the hills of Staten Island and the U.S. state of New Jersey. The modern-day park contains a playground, recreation center, and pool. The latter two comprise the Sunset Play Center, which is a New York City designated landmark.

The land for the park was acquired in 1891 through 1905 and initially contained a pond, golf course, rustic shelter, and carousel. These features were removed in 1935–1936 when the current neoclassical/Art Deco style pool was built by Aymar Embury II during a Works Progress Administration project. The facility was one of eleven opened in 1936 by city parks commissioner Robert Moses and mayor Fiorello LaGuardia.

=== Greenways ===
The Brooklyn Waterfront Greenway, a 14-mile (23 km) off-street path, runs on the waterfront of Sunset Park. The greenway is planned to connect neighborhoods along Brooklyn's waterfront, running through the Industry City complex to the 23-acre (9.3 ha) Owls Head Park in Bay Ridge, which is also served by the Sunset Park Greenway. One component of the greenway is Bush Terminal Piers Park, a green space between 43rd and 50th Streets that contains a pedestrian and bike path as well as baseball and soccer fields. Bush Terminal Piers Park opened in November 2014.

=== Other parks ===
Sunset Park also has several smaller playgrounds:

- D'Emic Playground at Third Avenue between 34th and 35th Streets
- Gonzalo Plasencia Playground at Third Avenue between 40th and 41st Streets
- John Allen Payne Playground at Third Avenue between 64th and 65th Streets
- Martin Luther Playground at Second Avenue between 55th and 56th Streets
- Pena Herrera Playground at Third Avenue between 46th and 47th Streets
- Rainbow Playground at Sixth Avenue between 55th and 56th Streets

NYC Parks also maintains a number of smaller park spaces, including triangles, pedestrian malls and strips, and areas with seating. These are technically classified as parks but do not serve a recreational purpose. However, the Sunset Park neighborhood generally lacks recreational space, other than the playgrounds and the eponymous park; the playgrounds that do exist are mostly paved asphalt play areas.

=== Green-Wood Cemetery ===
North of 39th Street and east of Fifth Avenue is Green-Wood Cemetery. Opened in 1840, it has been described as "Brooklyn's first public park by default" prior to Prospect Park's construction. Green-Wood Cemetery contains 600,000 graves and 7,000 trees spread out over 478 acres (193 ha).

== Religion ==
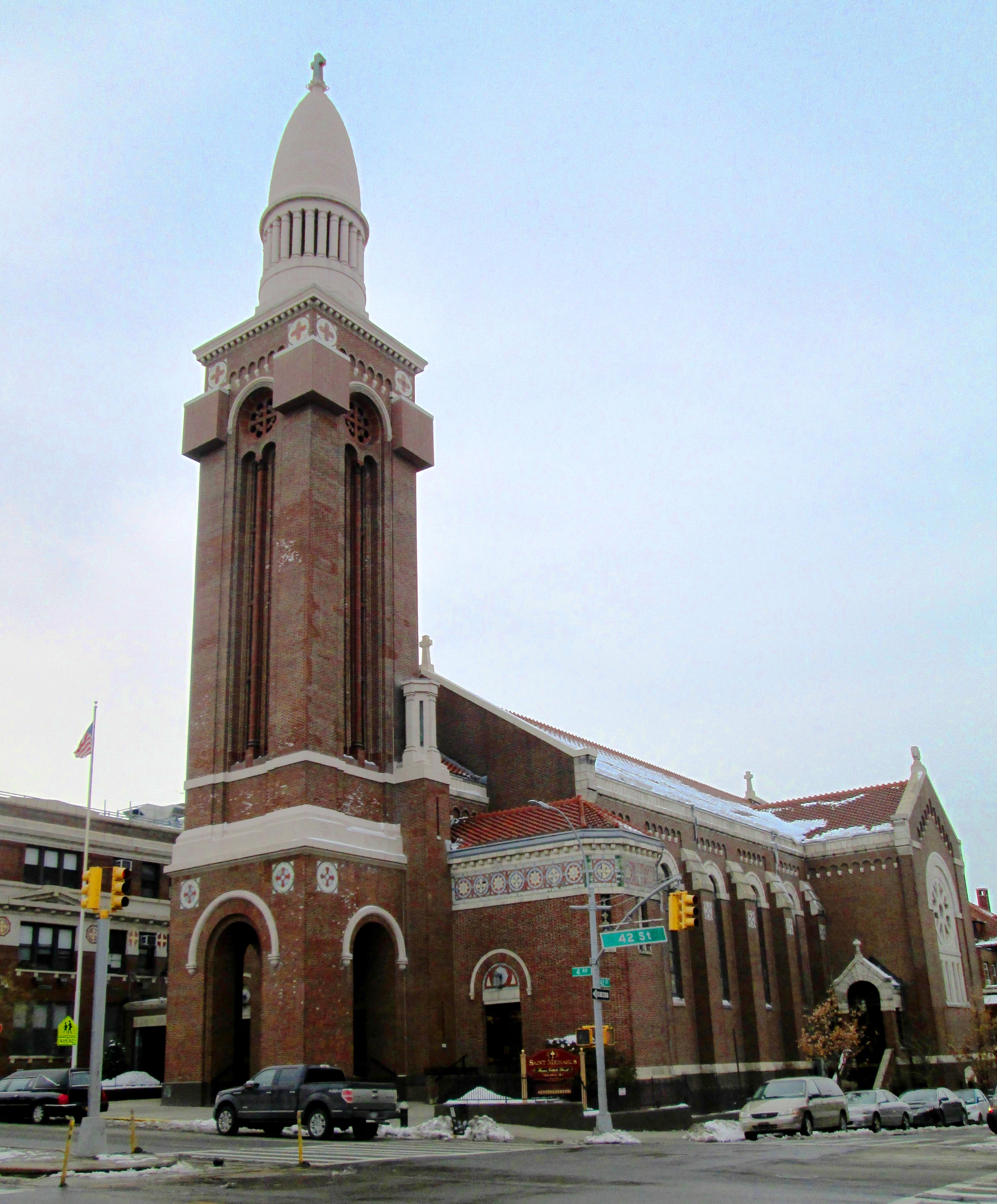
St. Michael's Roman Catholic Church; its dome dominates the neighborhood

Our Lady of Perpetual Help, the largest church in Brooklyn, fall 2026

Sunset Park has numerous churches and other places of worship. While many of these places of worship are Catholic or Pentecostal churches, there are also several mosques. Several places of worship are composed according to ethnicity. For instance, a 2013 guidebook stated that there were over 15 churches devoted to Hispanic congregations on Third through Sixth Avenues, while there were Chinese congregations on Seventh and Eighth Avenues. Three mosques are located in the vicinity of 59th/60th Streets and Eighth Avenue. Conversely, several churches have multi-ethnic congregations, including the Grace Baptist Church and Second Evangelical Free Church.

Sunset Park includes several architecturally prominent religious institutions. St. Michael's Catholic Church, an early Romanesque structure on Fourth Avenue at 42nd Street, built in 1903–1905 to a design by Raymond F. Almirall. Another is the Basilica of Our Lady of Perpetual Help, the largest church in Brooklyn, located on Fifth Avenue between 59th and 60th Streets. The church was founded in 1893–1894 at the same location, and the current building was finished in the 1920s. The presence of Our Lady of Perpetual Help indicated the large Catholic population that originally settled in Sunset Park. Additionally, at least five churches within Sunset Park are designed in the Neo Gothic style.

Farther north is the Parish of St. Rocco, a Catholic parish, housed in a former Norwegian Lutheran church on 27th Street. The Church of Our Lady of Czestochowa-St. Casimir, located nearby on 25th Street, is another Catholic parish; its red-brick building was designed in 1904 by John Ryan in the Gothic style.

== Education ==
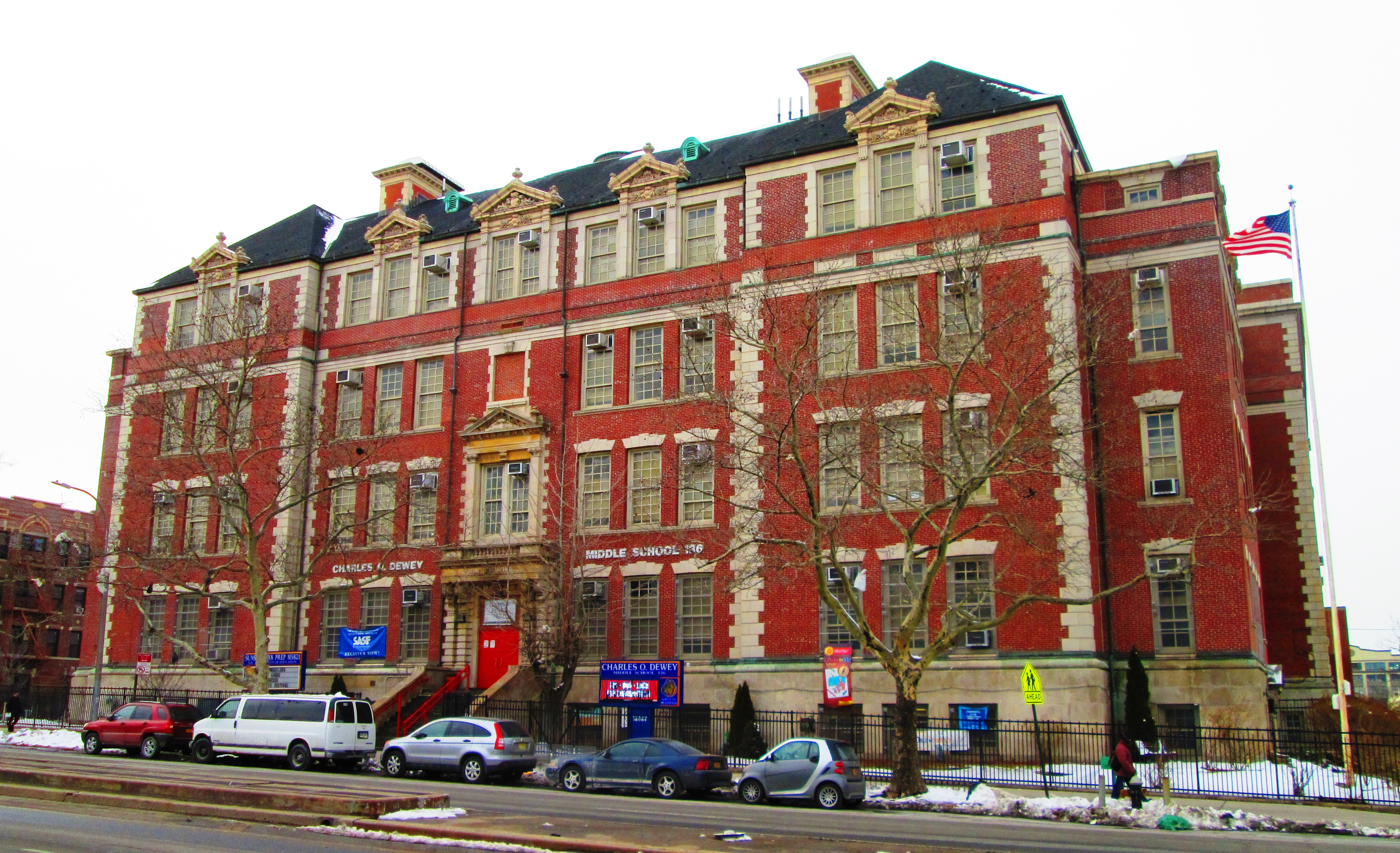
Charles O. Dewey and Sunset Park Prep middle schools share this building on Fourth Avenue

Sunset Park generally has a lower ratio of college-educated residents than the rest of the city as of 2018. While 30% of residents age 25 and older have a college education or higher, 41% have less than a high school education and 29% are high school graduates or have some college education. By contrast, 40% of Brooklynites and 38% of city residents have a college education or higher. The percentage of Sunset Park students excelling in reading and math has been increasing, with reading achievement rising from 44 percent in 2000 to 54 percent in 2011, and math achievement rising from 39 percent to 67 percent within the same period.

Sunset Park's rate of elementary school student absenteeism is lower than the rest of New York City. In Sunset Park, 9% of elementary school students missed twenty or more days per school year, compared to the citywide average of 20% of students. Additionally, 75% of high school students in Sunset Park graduate on time, equal to the citywide average of 75% of students. According to the Minnesota Population Center's 2011–2015 analysis of the American Community Survey, the most common language spoken at home in Community District 7 was Spanish, followed by English and Chinese.

=== Schools ===
Sunset Park contains the following public elementary schools which serve grades K–5 unless otherwise indicated:

- PS 1 The Bergen (grades PK–5)
- PS 24
- PS 69 Vincent D Grippo School
- PS 94 The Henry Longfellow
- PS 105 The Blythebourne School
- PS 169 Sunset Park
- PS 310
- PS 503 The School Of Discovery
- PS 506 The School Of Journalism And Technology
- PS 971

The following public middle schools serve grades 6–8:

- JHS 220 John J Pershing
- Sunset Park Prep
- IS 136 Charles O Dewey

The following public high schools serve grades 9–12:

- PS 371 Lillian L Rashkis
- Sunset Park High School

As of 2017, five new schools were being planned for Sunset Park. These included the 676-seat PS/IS 746, as well as three as-yet-unnamed new schools at 36th Street/Fifth Avenue, 59th Street/Third Avenue, and 46th Street/Eighth Avenue. In addition, the former 18th Police Precinct Station House and Stable was to be integrated into a new 300-seat school being built at the site.

=== Library ===
The Sunset Park branch of the Brooklyn Public Library is located at 5108 Fourth Avenue. It was founded in 1905 and was initially located in a two-story on basement Classical Revival structure, a Carnegie library designed by Lord and Hewlett. Known colloquially as the "Fourth Avenue library", the library was officially designated as the South Branch and frequently utilized by students from the adjacent district of Borough Park due to the lack of comparable resources at that neighborhood's storefront branch on Thirteenth Avenue. Following a serious 1970 fire, the old library was demolished and rebuilt, reopening in January 1972. A redevelopment of the library site was proposed in 2014 and approved in 2017; the plan calls for a 21,000-square-foot (2,000 m^{2}) library and 49 affordable housing units to be constructed at 5108 Fourth Avenue. In May 2018, a temporary branch was opened at 4201 Fourth Avenue, between 42nd and 43rd Streets.

== Transportation ==
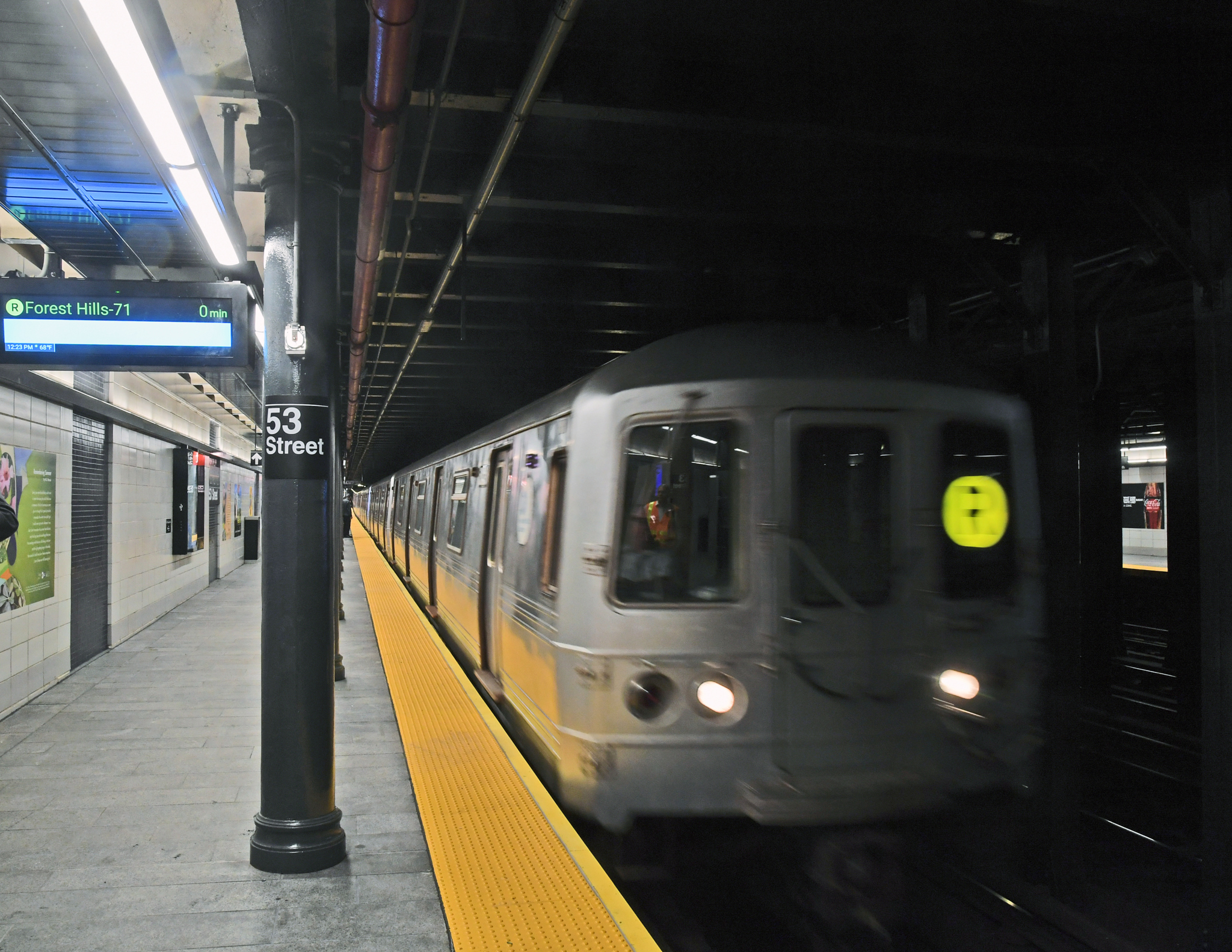
The 53rd Street station

=== Road ===
Sunset Park has access to three limited-access highways: the I-278 (Gowanus) and NY 27 (Prospect) Expressways as well as the Belt Parkway. The Gowanus Expressway runs on the western side of the neighborhood while the Prospect Expressway runs to the north, near Park Slope. The Belt Parkway only serves the southwestern corner of Sunset Park. While I-278 has exits to the Sunset Park waterfront at 38th-39th Streets, there are no entrances to the highway from these streets, forcing traffic bound for I-278 to use local streets. In addition, numerous local streets are designated as truck routes, including the Gowanus and Prospect Expressways, Third Avenue, and parts of several other streets.

=== Buses and commuter vans ===
Six New York City Bus lines serve Sunset Park:

- B9: to Bay Ridge or Kings Plaza via 60th Street
- B11: to Flatbush Avenue–Brooklyn College station via 49th/50th Streets
- B35: to Brownsville via 39th Street
- B37: to Boerum Hill or Fort Hamilton via Third Avenue
- B63: to Brooklyn Bridge Park or Fort Hamilton via Fifth Avenue
- B70: to Dyker Heights via 39th Street and Eighth Avenue

The area is also home to the Jackie Gleason Bus Depot, renamed in 1988 in honor of the Brooklyn-born actor.

Some traffic from Sunset Park to either Manhattan's or Flushing's Chinatowns is handled by privately held minibuses or "dollar vans". These small commuter vans carry passengers between the locales for a fee.

=== Subways and railroads ===
Several New York City Subway stations are located in Sunset Park. The BMT Fourth Avenue Line has stations at 36th Street (D, N, and R trains), 45th Street (R train), 53rd Street (R train), and 59th Street (N and R trains). The BMT West End Line (D, R, and W trains) has a station at Ninth Avenue, while the BMT Sea Beach Line (N train) has a station at Eighth Avenue.

Sunset Park also contains a network of waterfront freight railroads. The 65th Street Yard is located at the far south end of Sunset Park, and contains two car float bridges that can load freight rail cars onto car floats to New Jersey. The yard contains connections to two freight lines. It is the terminus of the Bay Ridge Branch, which runs to Queens and the Bronx. There is also a connection to a street-level railway on First Avenue that connects the Brooklyn Army Terminal, Bush Terminal/Industry City, and the subway's 36th Street Yard via the South Brooklyn Railway. The First Avenue tracks connect to the First Avenue Yard, a smaller freight yard on First Avenue between 43rd and 51st Streets.

=== Ferry services ===
From 1997 to 2001, SeaStreak service was available at the Brooklyn Army Terminal heading to Pier 11/Wall Street, the East 34th Street Ferry Landing, the Sandy Hook Bay Marina, or Riis Landing on summer Fridays. After subway service in Lower Manhattan was disrupted following 9/11, the city established a free ferry service from the Brooklyn Army Terminal's 58th Street Pier to Pier 11/Wall Street, using funds provided by the Federal Emergency Management Agency. New York Water Taxi took over the route in 2003 and instituted a fare. In 2008, New York Water Taxi established a route between Pier 11 and Breezy Point, Queens, with a stop at Brooklyn Army Terminal. This service was indefinitely suspended in 2010 due to lack of funding.

In the aftermath of subway disruptions arising from Hurricane Sandy on October 29, 2012, SeaStreak began running a route from Rockaway Park, Queens, to Pier 11 and the East 34th Street ferry terminal. The route was renewed several times through mid-2014, but was discontinued on October 31, 2014, because of a lack of funding. Sunset Park has been served by NYC Ferry's South Brooklyn and Rockaway routes since 2017. In January 2020, the New York City Economic Development Corporation announced that NYC Ferry would construct a new stop at 42nd Street near Industry City/Bush Terminal, which would open in 2021.

== Metropolitan Detention Center ==
Sunset Park is home to the Metropolitan Detention Center (MDC), as of 2025 the only active federal jail in New York City, and has been home to a number of high-profile detainees and convicts, including in recent years 6ix9ine, R. Kelly, Ghislaine Maxwell, Luigi Mangione, Sam Bankman-Fried, Nicolás Maduro and Sean "Diddy" Combs. The facility is also known for its subpar conditions, and several homicides and suicides have taken place there in recent years.

== See also ==
- Opportunities for a Better Tomorrow
