= Alku and Alku Toinen =

Historic buildings in Brooklyn, New York

- U.S. National Register of Historic Places
- New York State Register of Historic Places
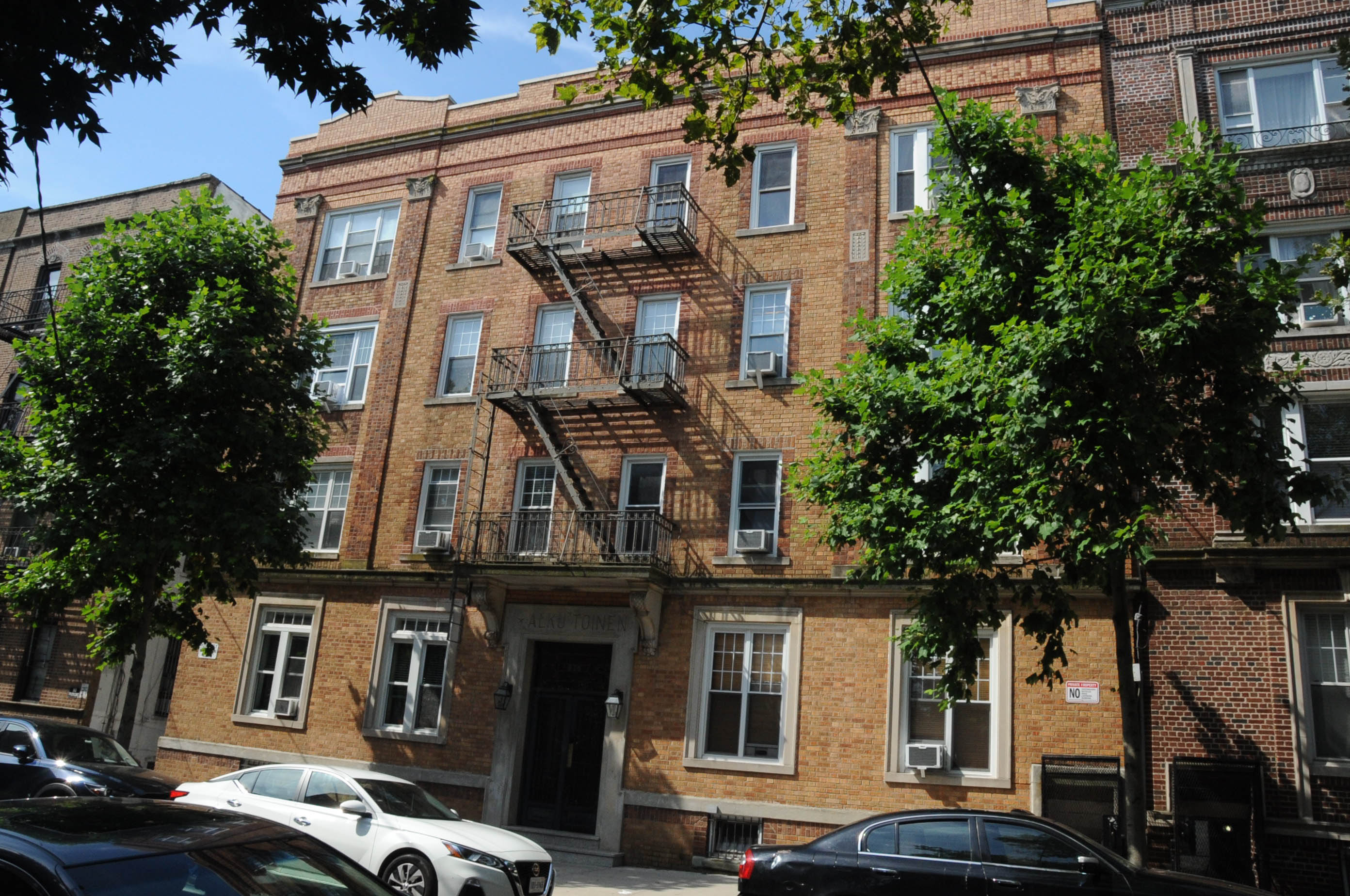
- Exterior view of Alku Toinen from 43rd Street

- Location within New York City Location within New York Location within the United States
- Location: 816–826 43rd Street, Brooklyn, New York 11232
- Coordinates: 40.644583°N 73.999120°W
- Built: 1916
- Architect: Eric O. Holmgren
- Architectural style: Arts and Crafts
- NRHP reference No.: 100003932
- NYSRHP No.: 04701.020972, 04701.020973

Significant dates
- Added to NRHP: May 20, 2019
- Designated NYSRHP: March 27, 2019

Alku and Alku Toinen (pronounced [ˈɑlku ˈtoi̯nen]) are apartment buildings built in 1916 by the Finnish American immigrant community in the Sunset Park neighborhood of Brooklyn, New York City. Located at 816–826 43rd Street, they were the first nonprofit housing cooperatives in New York City.

The buildings were added to the National Register of Historic Places on May 20, 2019.

== History ==
Finntown, an enclave of Finnish immigrants in northern Sunset Park, was composed of immigrants arriving during the first decades of the 20th century. At its peak, the enclave had 10,000 Finnish residents and contained its own Finnish language newspaper. In 1916, a group of sixteen families, who were Finnish and Scandinavian Americans, began pooling their money together to build their own building in a cooperative style, as seen in Finland, to leave oppressive policies of landlords. The following year, the group incorporated the Finnish Home Building Association and began construction on units for 16 families.

The structures were called "Alku" and "Alku Toinen", which translated respectively to "Beginning" and "Beginning Second". The apartments were designed by Eric O. Holmgren in the Arts and Crafts architectural style. Because Alku and Alku Toinen comprised the first purpose-built, nonprofit housing cooperative in New York City, they were subject to the rules of the New York State Department of Agriculture and Markets, under which agricultural cooperatives were regulated. During construction, a member of the Finnish Home Building Association was tasked to supervise each day's work. Other members of the association, union-affiliated workers with knowledge in manual trades such as bricklaying and plumbing, worked on the construction itself, being hired by the day.

Members of the Finnish Home Building Association wrote a constitution and bylaws, as well as a set of five principles. These principles set the foundation for future cooperatives, both in New York City and nationwide. By 1922, the Finns had constructed twenty co-ops in Sunset Park. These initially catered primarily to Finnish residents, but others of European descent also lived in these co-ops. The construction of Alku and Alku Toinen subsequently led to the construction of housing cooperatives over New York City, and by 2017, one observer wrote that there were three co-op units for every condominium in New York City. The Finns also kept building co-ops in Sunset Park, with 50 cooperatives in the neighborhood by 1947.

== Description ==
The building exteriors are made of brick. Members paid an initial payment of $500 and a recurring monthly fee of $25 to $33, in contrast with the area's average rents of $75 to $85 at the time. The apartments, built for 16 families, each contain five rooms and at the time of opening were outfitted with modern conveniences including heat, electricity, kitchens and bathrooms. Members wrote a constitution and bylaws to govern the building and outline five principles: democratic control, a nonprofit structure, voluntary membership with individual economic participation, and concern for community.

== See also ==
- National Register of Historic Places listings in Brooklyn
