= Greenwood High International School =

Coordinates: 12.9005°N 77.7492°E

Greenwood High International School, Bangalore
- GWH
- No.8-14, Chikkawadayarapura, near Heggondahalli, Gunjur Post, Varthur Sarjapur, Bangalore, Karnataka, India; Varthur; Bangalore, India, Karnataka, 560087; India

Information
- School type: International Residential school Co-educational
- Motto: Rooted in Knowledge (ज्ञान में जड़ें; Arraigado en el conocimiento; الجذور في المعرفة; Enraciné dans la connaissance; ಜ್ಞಾನದಲ್ಲಿ ಬೇರೂರಿದೆ)
- Established: c. 2004
- Status: Open
- Sister school: Greenwood High School, Bannerghatta
- Area trustee: Greenwood Educational Trust
- CEEB code: 671681
- Chairman: Mr Bijay Agarwal
- Principal: Louis Lopez
- Grades: Nursery to 12
- Years offered: 2004 - Present
- Gender: Co-ed
- Age range: 2.5 - 18
- International students: Yes
- Classes: Nursery— Grade 12
- Average class size: 30
- Student to teacher ratio: 30:1
- Hours in school day: 7
- Campuses: Sarjapur, Bannerghatta, Hennur
- Campus size: 40 acres (160,000 m^{2})
- Campus type: Urban
- Houses: Sapphire, Emerald, Topaz, Ruby
- Colours: Black, Green, White
- Slogan: Rooted In Knowledge
- Song: To Greenwood High We All Belong
- Athletics: Yes
- Sports: Basketball, football, swimming, skating, lawn tennis, chess, cricket, badminton etc.
- Mascot: The Banyan Tree
- Nickname: Vulcans
- National ranking: 4th
- Publication: Fruition
- Affiliations: IB, IGCSE, ICSE, ISC
- Website: www.greenwoodhigh.edu.in

Greenwood High is an educational institution in Bangalore, Karnataka, India. It has pre-schools located in Koramangala, Jayanagar, J P Nagar, Electronic City and main campuses in Sarjapura, Bannerghatta, and Whitefield.

The pre-school campuses follow a mix of Montessori, Froebel's (Kindergarten), Howard Gardner's Multiple Intelligence Theory, and Daniel Goleman’s Emotional Intelligence Theories.

== Curriculum ==
Greenwood High follows IBDP (International Baccalaureate Diploma Program), IGCSE (International General Certificate of Secondary Education) ICSE (Indian Certificate of Secondary Education) and ISC (Indian School Certificate) curricula. It has completed the IB authorization process in 2011 and became an IB world school. Presently it is offering IB diploma program from ages 14 up to 19 years for secondary school. Greenwood High is now affiliated to ISC also started in 2015-16.

For Primary and Middle classes i.e. 1 to 10th, it offers both ICSE & IGCSE curriculum. GWH offers Spanish, German and French as a second language option for IGCSE. IGCSE exams are conducted by CIE, (Cambridge International Examination).

== Sports and extracurricular activity ==
Chess is a part of curriculum.

Over 700 students had participated in a play; pied piper of Hamelin which was directed by Arundhati Raja who is a founder of Jagriti Theater. Theater is a subject in the IGCSE and IB courses.

'Roon Raman, an author whose research and innovation company works in the area of materials science and has won acclaim for developing scientific talent at the grassroots, has visited and interacted with IB and IGCSE students. The theme was "The Story Within Us All".

Students have won state and national level tournaments and awards. Below are a few mentions:

- An IB DP student has been awarded the National Innovation Foundation award instituted by the Union Department of Science and Technology (government of India) for an idea to make life easier for street vendors who use handcarts. The award was presented by former President A P J Abdul Kalam on 19 Jan 2014.
- A KG student has won a silver medal at Asian School Chess championship held in Sri Lanka between 30 August and 6 September, where 385 children of varying ages, from 15 countries, participated.
- An IB student in the 11th grade got three acceptances in the Golden Digital Circuit.
- A student of Grade 8 has represented Karnataka State Junior Basketball Team in the 40thSub-Junior National Basketball Championship held at Patliputra Sports Complex (Patna, Bihar) from August 18–25, 2013.
- A student has secured 10th Rank in the MaRRS International Spelling Bee held on 29 June 2013.
- GWH was the winner of the Mahindra Football National Inter-school Championship in 2012.
- Greenwood High has won the inter-school chess tournament in Bangalore five times in a row.
- A student of KG II got second place and won silver medal in the Under-5 Girls Category of the National School Chess Championship at Chennai from 9 to 11 June 2013.
- A grade 7 student has finished No.1 in the under 12 (C Category Girls) in the Indian Golf union national merit list and 4th in the All India Juniors in Dec 2011.

=== Management ===
Bijay Kumar Agarwal who is chairman of the board of trustees and also the chairman of Sattva Group, a property developer and aerospace business company in Bangalore India.
