= Bannerghatta =

Bannerghatta, Bannergatta, or Bannerughatta may refer to these in India:

- Bannerghatta National Park, a national Park near Bengaluru
  - Bannerghatta Biological Park, Bengaluru
  - Bannerghatta Road, State Highway 87 (Karnataka)
- Bannerghatta (film), 2021 Indian Malayalam-language film starring Karthik Ramakrishnan
- Bannerghatta (town), a village in Jigani hobli, Anekal taluk, Karnataka, India
