= Bannerghatta Biological Park =

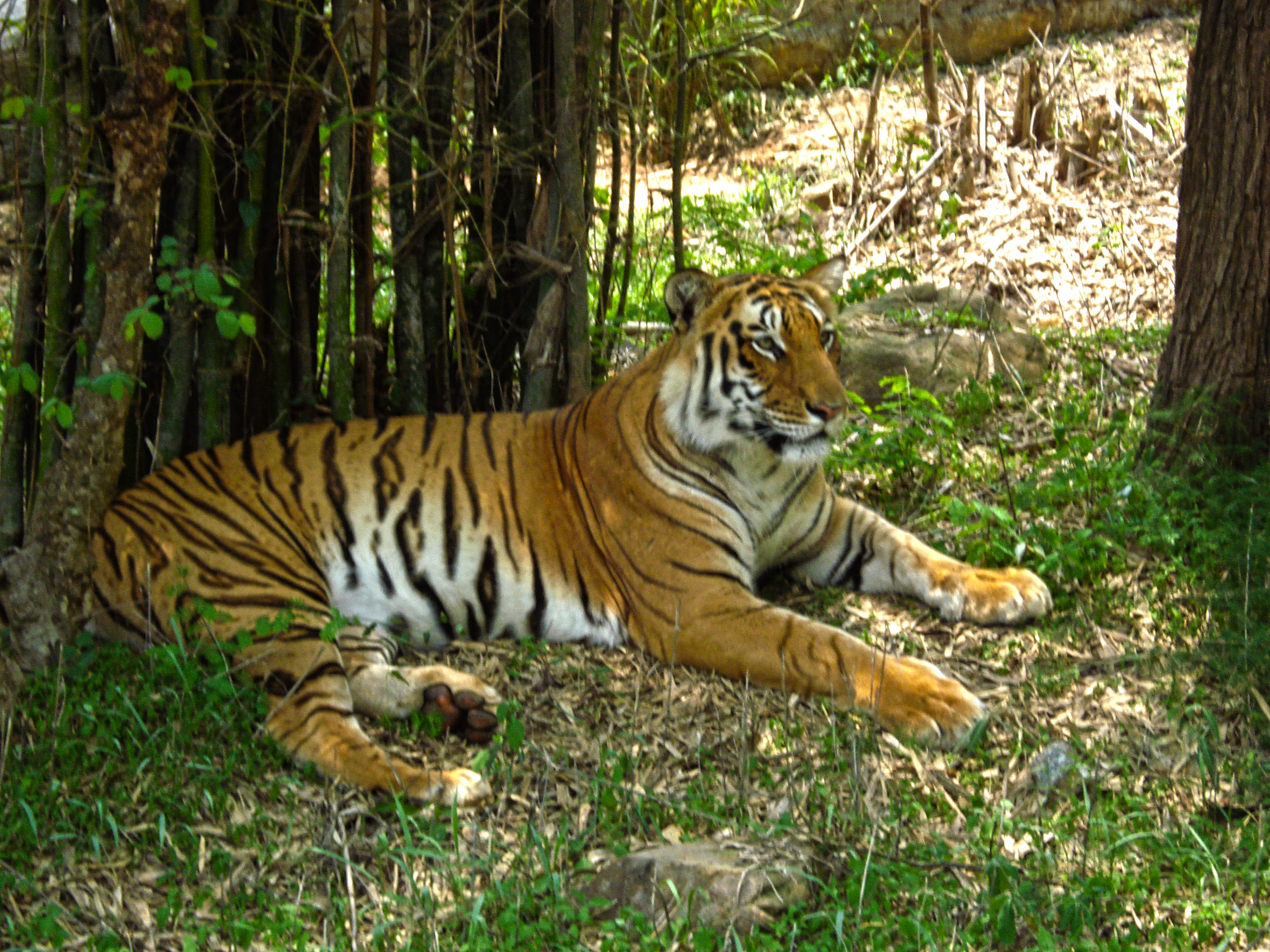
- Tiger Enclosure-Safari Park
- Location: Bannerghatta, Bengaluru
- Land area: 731.88 ha (1,808.5 acres)
- No. of animals: 2388
- No. of species: 137
- Annual visitors: 1,616,130 (FY 2019/20)
- Website: Bannerghatta Biological Park

Bannerghatta Biological Park, also known as the Bannerghatta Zoo, is a zoological garden located in the city of Bengaluru. It was initially a small zoo and picnic corner within Bannerghatta National Park (BNP) which was started in 1974. The bifurcation of the Biological Park and the National Park took place in 2002. The Bannerghatta Biological Park covers a total area of 731.88 hectares and includes a zoo, safari park, butterfly park and rescue centre. The Zoo Authority of Karnataka, the University of Agricultural Sciences, Bangalore, and the Ashoka Trust for Research in Ecology and Environment (ATREE), Bangalore, are collaborating agencies. For the convenience of the general public, the Governing Council of Zoo Authority of Karnataka had decided to rename Bannerghatta Biological Park as 'Bengaluru Bannerghatta Biological Park' (BBBP).

== History ==
The Chief Conservator of Forests in the Karnataka Forest Department, Shri Y.M.L Sharma, IFS and founder of Bannerghatta National Park, created a picnic corner within the Bannerghatta forest in 1971. The Bannerghatta National Park was officially created in 1974 for conserving the flora and fauna in the area. As a result of demands for providing recreational and wildlife tourism facilities to the visiting tourists, the idea came about for creating a mini zoo and a nature park by carving out a small portion out of the tourism zone inside the national park.

The lion safari was established in 1979, followed by the establishment of tiger safari in 1987. In 2000, a dedicated wildlife rescue and rehabilitation centre was established with the assistance of the Central Zoo Authority of India. In 2002, the Government of Karnataka created a dedicated organization, the Zoo Authority of Karnataka (ZAK) for the management zoos in the state. Following this, the Bannerghatta zoo, various safari units and rescue centres within the national park were pooled together to form the Bannerghatta Biological Park and brought under the jurisdiction of the Zoo Authority of Karnataka. In 2007, a Butterfly Park was established within the limits of the Biological Park.

== Location ==
The Bannerghatta Biological Park is located within the limits of Anekal Revenue Taluk in the Bangalore Urban District. The park is situated almost midway between the city center of Bengaluru and the Anekal town, at about 25 km from Vidhana Soudha and at about 20 km to the North West of Anekal town. It is connected to the city by an all weather road. It is situated at the distance of 4 km from Gottigere, which is the boundary of the Bruhat Bengaluru Mahanagara Palike (BBMP).

== Areas and attractions ==
Currently, the Banneghatta Biological Park consists of the Bannerghatta Zoo, the Safari, the Butterfly Park and the Rescue and Rehabilitation centre.

== Zoo ==
The Bannerghatta Zoo was started as a picnic corner and was controlled by the Forest Department, Government of Karnataka, in the year 1971 in an area of 16.00 Ha. The zoo is saddled between the Champakadhama hill and Mirza hill in the Bannerghatta Sandal Reserve. Several species of mammals, reptiles and birds of both exotic and Indian origin are displayed in captivity. There are 1941 individual animals belonging to 94 different species. Most prominent and interesting ones are Thamin deer, Hog deer, King Cobra, Crocodiles, Himalayan black bear, panthers and various birds. In addition there is a Museum and an Auditorium for the visitors education. Present extent of Zoo area is 12 Ha and it is expanded by another 28.00 Ha. Eight new enclosures will be constructed in the expansion area.

== Safari ==
The park offers safari excursions to observe the free range captive wildlife in immersive, naturalistic exhibits in the midst of the natural forests of Bannerghatta and Ragihalli Reserve Forest. The safari is jointly managed and monitored by Karnataka State Tourism Development Corporation (KSTDC) and BBP with a revenue sharing on a 50:50 basis between the two organizations. There are different types of transport such as bus, van etc. Each has one amount. KSTDC focuses on sales, revenue collection and physical monitoring of the buses whereas BBP fixes the fee for the visitors. The buses have a seating capacity of 30 people and other vehicles are also available to visitors in smaller groups. The visitors are only allowed inside the safari in these secured safari vehicles. The safari route passes through the picturesque hillock Mettubunde offering a panoramic view of the landscape consisting of broken hillocks chains and valleys with lush green forests.

In late September 2013, the safari was closed for weeks due to an outbreak of foot and mouth disease among the herbivorous animals.

=== Herbivore Safari ===
This section was developed during the 1970s but opened to public viewing only in 2002. The entire area has been barricaded with stone walls along with the additional support of solar powered fences and Elephant proof trenches (EPT). The vegetation in the safari is more favourable to the herbivore animals round the year as large number of fodder species like bamboo are found in abundance and presence of waterbodies. Edible grass species such as sacharam, cymbogogon and heteropogon are commonly seen in the grass land and constitute the main fodder. There are 5 waterbodies found in the safari area, Deepankere, Chennamanakere, Gowdankunte and Seegadikunte, Gowdanakere. These waterbodies are perennial and serve as the source of water for the animals during all the seasons. The animals housed in the safari enclosures include Gaur, Sambar, Chital, Barking Deer, Black Buck, Hog Deer and Nilgai. The other animals naturally found in the safari are wild boar, porcupine, pangolin etc.

=== Bear Safari ===
This section of the safari area is enclosed by an open dry moat. The outerwall of the moat is embedded with stone slabs to prevent the sloth bear from escaping and to avoid trespass of any other free ranging wildlife into the area. This safari is also provided with animal housing facilities in 05 blocks namely Panchavati, Chitrakuta, Kishkinda, Dr. G.K.V Block and Jambava. There is a total of around 100 holding rooms for the bears with kitchen facilities. The forest area is planned to be planted additionally with varieties of fruit yielding trees to simulate a natural habitat for bears. In 2005, the facility was allowed to also house and maintain bears rescued from Kalandars from all over India.

=== Lion Safari ===
The safari was started in 1979. It occupies around 5.00 Ha of forest area enclosed by a tall chain link mesh with the height of around 15 feet. Additionally a big moat all round the chain link mesh fence has been created to avoid the trespassing of any wild animals living in the area. The animal house is provided with 11 holding rooms and all the 11 holding rooms are provided with retrieval area for the daytime rest. The identified groups of animals are allowed into safari on a rotational basis regularly for the benefit of visiting tourists.

=== Tiger Safari ===
The safari was started in 1987. The peripheral boundary of the 3 units inside the safari area consists of an open moat and another chain linked mesh fence. Indira Gandhi Tiger Safari has the facility of 11 holding rooms. The Appaiah Tiger Safari has the facilities of 2 animal housing complexes. Both animal houses together has 10 animal holding rooms. The White tiger safari has the facilities of 2 animal housing complexes. There are totally 8 animal holding rooms. All the holding houses are provided with basic facilities of water and sanitation. Like the Lion Safari, the identified groups of animals are only allowed into safari on a rotational basis.

== Rescue and Rehabilitation centre ==
The National Zoo Policy 1998, requires all zoos to function as rescue centre for orphaned, refused, rescued wild animals, subject to the availability of appropriate housing and up keeping facilities. It also mandates that such a facility should not be accessible to visitors. To be compliant with this policy, the Rescue and Rehabilitation Centre within the limits of Bannerghatta Biological Park started functioning in 2000. It is spread over an area of 17.50 Ha.

== Butterfly park ==
On 25 November 2006, Kapil Sibal, the Union Minister of Science and Technology opened India's first butterfly enclosure at the park. It occupies 7.5 acres (30,000 m^{2}) and houses a butterfly conservatory, a museum, and an audiovisual room. The butterfly conservatory, a circular enclosure with a poly-carbonate roof, is 10,000 sq ft (1,000 m^{2}). Within the conservatory, the environment has been designed to support over twenty species of butterfly. It is a humid tropical climate, with an artificial waterfall and appropriate flora to attract butterflies. The conservatory leads to a second and third dome, which house a museum containing dioramas and exhibits of carefully preserved butterflies.

== Adoption Scheme ==
The Animal Adoption Program is carried out to inculcate awareness and the responsibility of conserving threatened and endangered fauna and flora in the minds of people. It provides a unique opportunity for persons to contribute to the enrichment and conservation of wildlife and gives the satisfaction of directly funding the basic requirements of an animal. Both individuals and companies participate in this program, as it serves as a convenient means to express solidarity with values of environmentalism and wildlife conservation. This program goes beyond the task of spreading awareness and enables persons to actively contribute to the preservation of wildlife.

Adoption involves paying for the feed, maintenance and veterinary health care expenses of the animal. Beyond minor perks such as adoption certificates, one time complimentary passes for five members, opportunities to participate in a workshop or conference, this program inspires amongst zoo visitors empathy for wild animals, an understanding and awareness about the need for conservation of natural resources and the importance of maintaining the ecological balance. Active participation in wildlife conservation enables one to be more conscious of environmental friendly principles, lifestyles and the importance of nature.

Although this program was initially slow to gain momentum, it is gaining popularity gradually and the demand is increasing to adopt more animals housed at the zoo. It serves as a suitable practical activity to teach persons to protect wildlife and it does not require massive amounts of money, long-term commitments or long hours of time, but is viable alongside busy schedules and other social commitments. It is also a feasible means to excite, encourage and train youngsters to preserve nature and wildlife.

Based on the expenditure involved per animal, animals can be adopted for a period of three months to one year. Animals are categorized into different classes: Diamond, Gold, Silver and Bronze. These classes are based on the expenses required for an animal per year. Within each class there are sub-categories further segregating costs required.

The diamond class includes the elephant (₹300 000), Tiger (₹200 000), hippopotamus (₹150 000) etc. The gold class includes the Indian Leopard, sloth bear, gaur and other animals (₹50 000). Subsequent levels in the gold class include the Golden Jackal, Indian Grey Wolf, Striped Hyena etc. (₹30 000). Sponsoring the Spot-Billed Pelican, Black Headed Ibis, etc. is at ₹25 000 and the Common Ostrich, Rhea, Emu etc. is at ₹20 000. The silver class with its different subdivisions include the Spotted Deer, Sambar, Blue And Yellow Macaw, Green Winged Macaw, etc. at ₹15 000 and the Jungle Cat, Great Indian Hornbill, Galah, Blue Crowned Pigeon etc. at ₹10 000. The Bronze class also involves sub categories with varying amounts.

Typically the Animal Adoption Program and Corporate Social Responsibility (CSR) program together covers around 5%- 10% of the feed cost. The annually anticipated remuneration from the adoption program is set at ₹2.5 million. Adoption of animals can be carried out online at the Bengaluru Bannerghatta Biological Park official website.

== Coping with the Pandemic ==
Numbers of visitors
2017-2018	1 558,142
2018-2019	1 661,974
2019-2020	1 646,034
2020-2021	554,076

Numbers of visitors to the park have dwindled in the years 2020-2021 due to the pandemic resulting in the park that is customarily opened in six days of the week and closed every Tuesday, to be closed on weekends and opened five days of the week (Mon-Fri). Precautionary measures to certify the park as safe for public visit has not resulted in a significant increase in visitors. Hence, additional precautionary measures have been taken with regard to the expenditures carried out at the park.

This has been done by adopting somewhat self-sustainable and economic pro-active measures in the management of the park. Utilizing internal resources such as locally grown fodder and fruits for herbivorous animals and carrying out sustainable fishing in water bodies within the park premises are notable measures. In addition, veterinary interns have been sourced to support veterinary staff in diagnosing and treating animals. These cost reduction measures have successfully resulted in a saving of Rs. 2.00 crores.

These self –sustaining initiatives exemplify eco-friendly principles that have not just resulted in cost reduction in terms of transport and packing expenditures, but also in subsequent reduction in pollution. Although just a fraction of overall national contribution to green principles, it nevertheless demonstrates eco- friendly measures that can be followed during the pandemic. Overall Bannerghatta Biological Park has embraced a number of clever measures to increase revenue while simultaneously propagating environment and wildlife conservation awareness and eco-friendly principles.

== Gallery ==
Bannerghata National Park

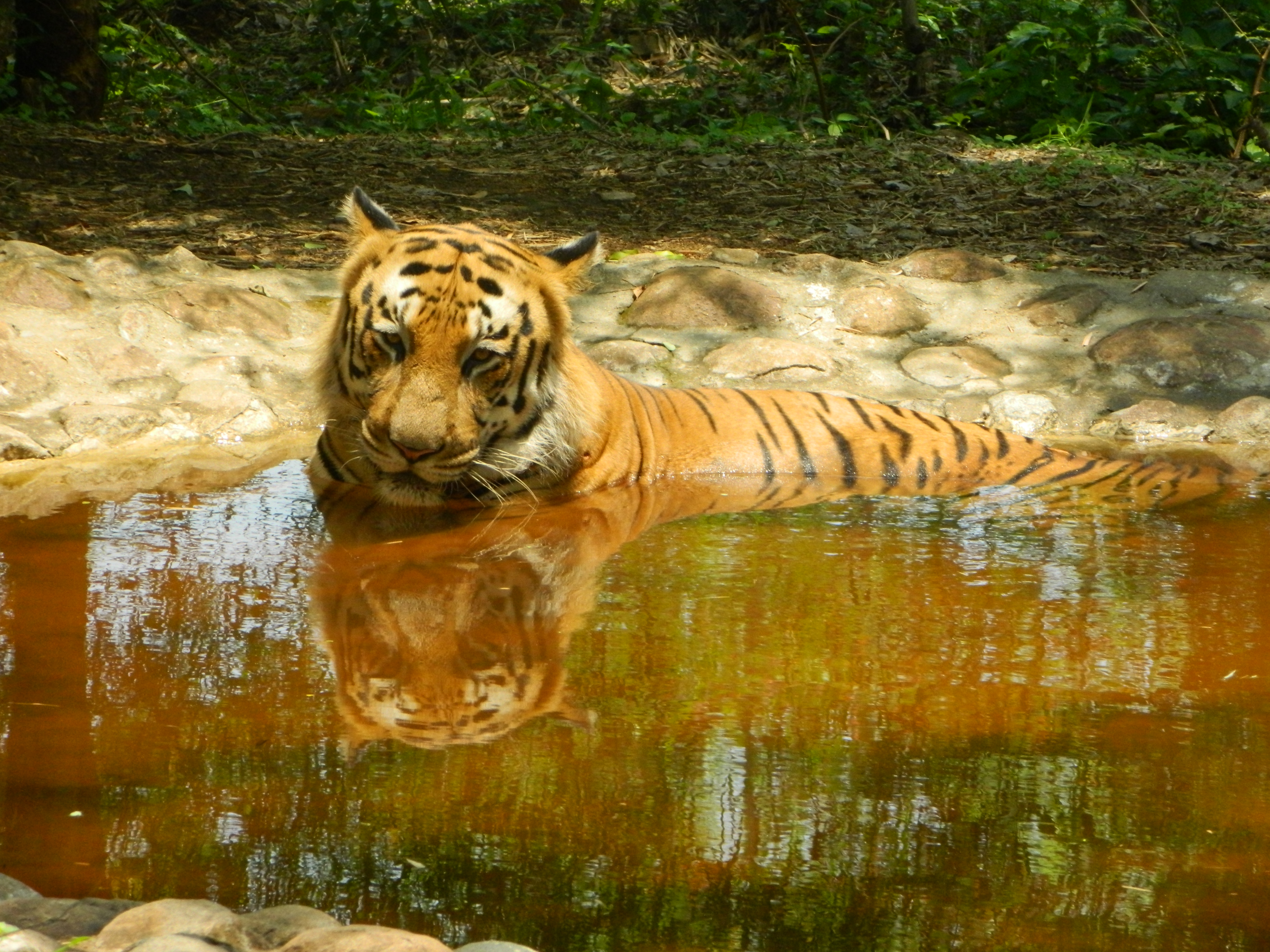
Bengal tiger

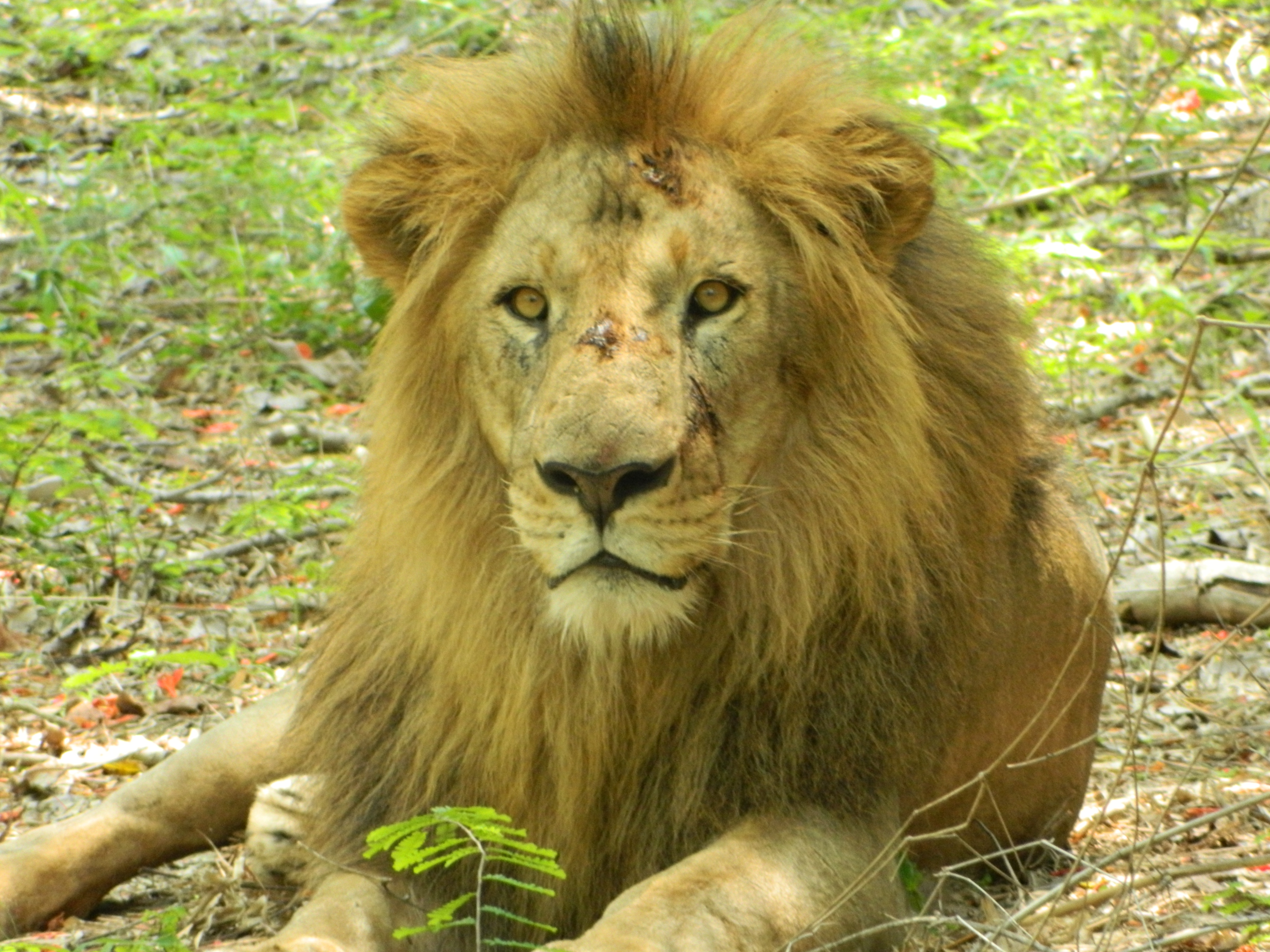
Lion

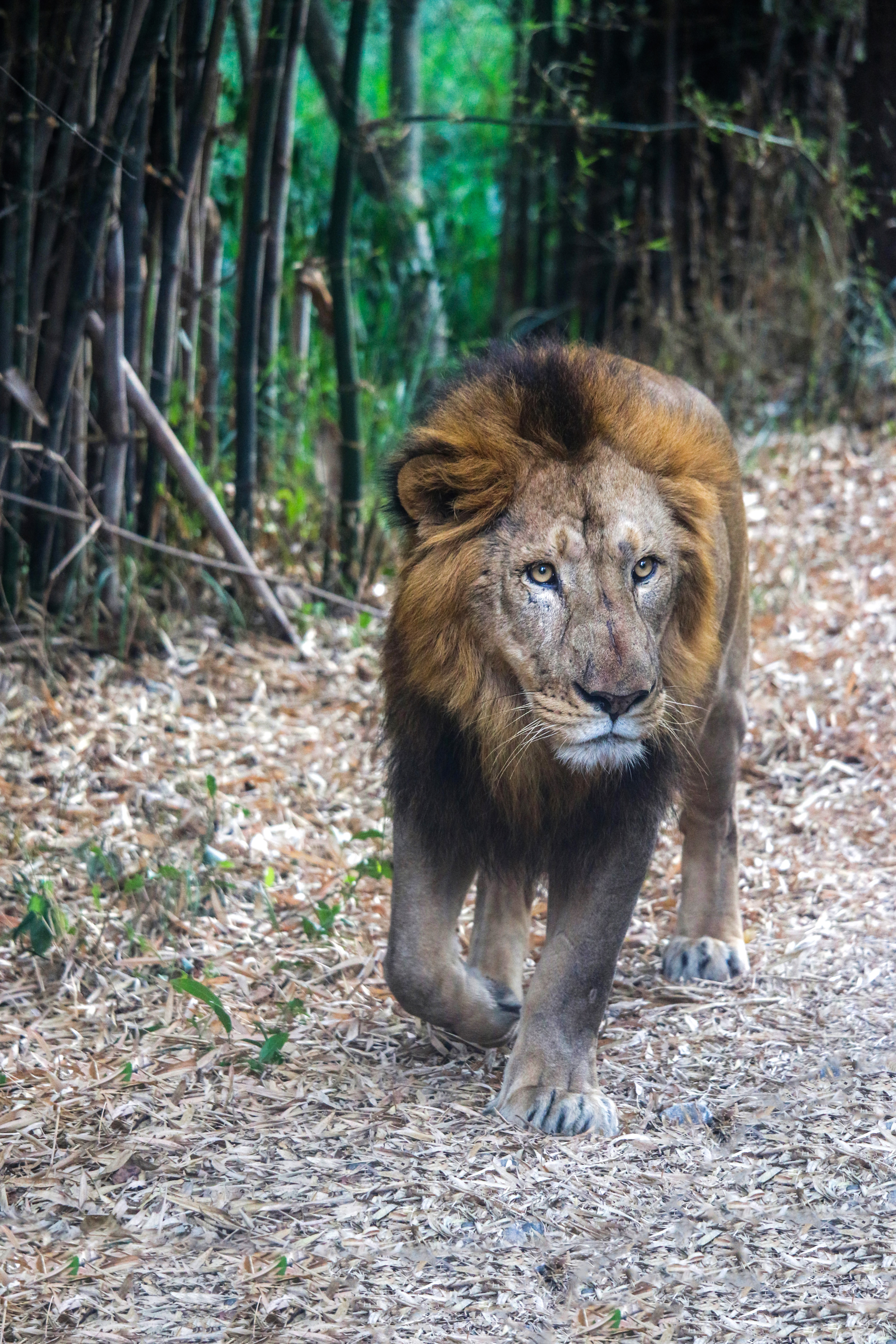
Lion during Safari

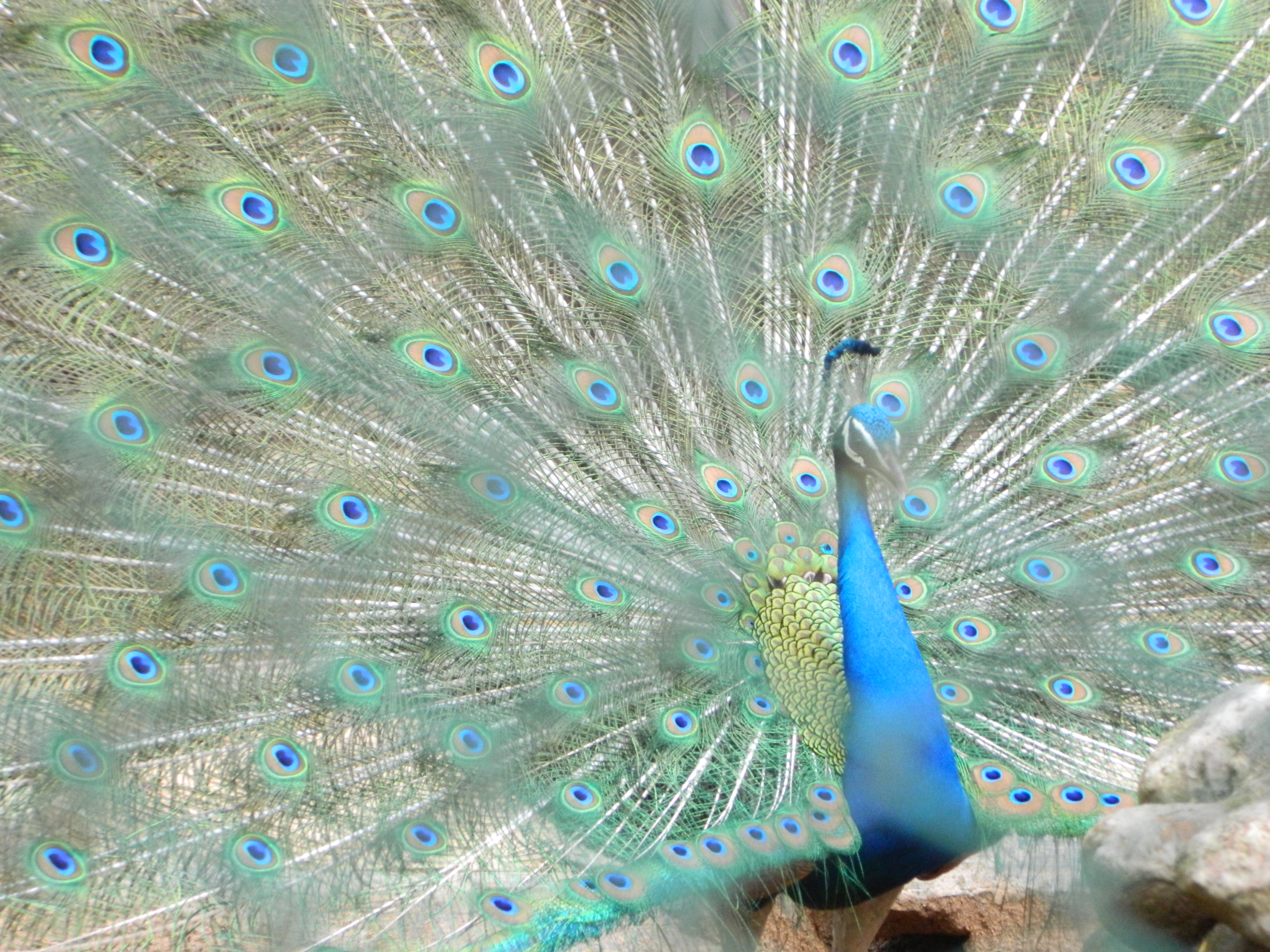
DancingPeacock

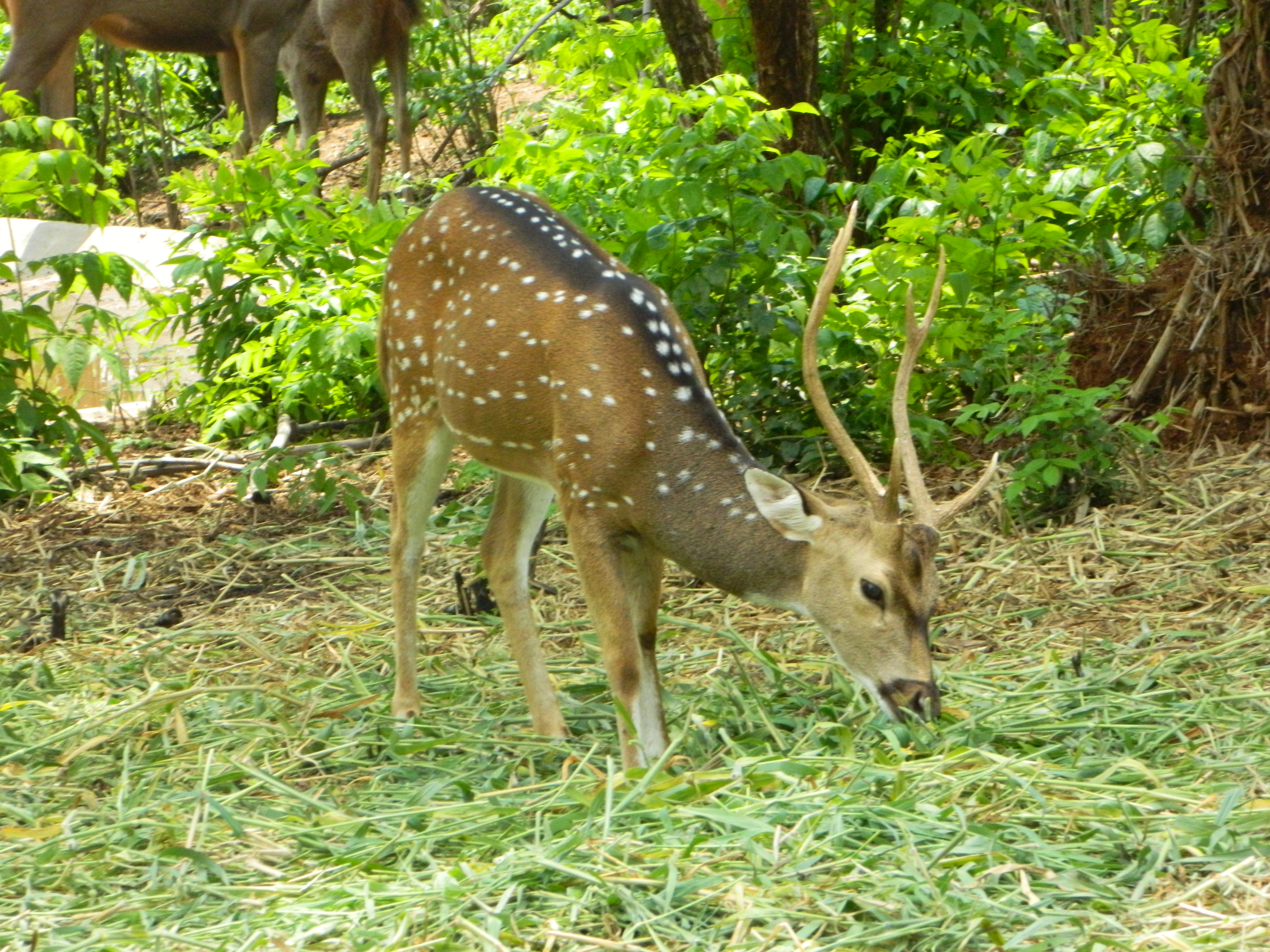
Chital (spotted deer)

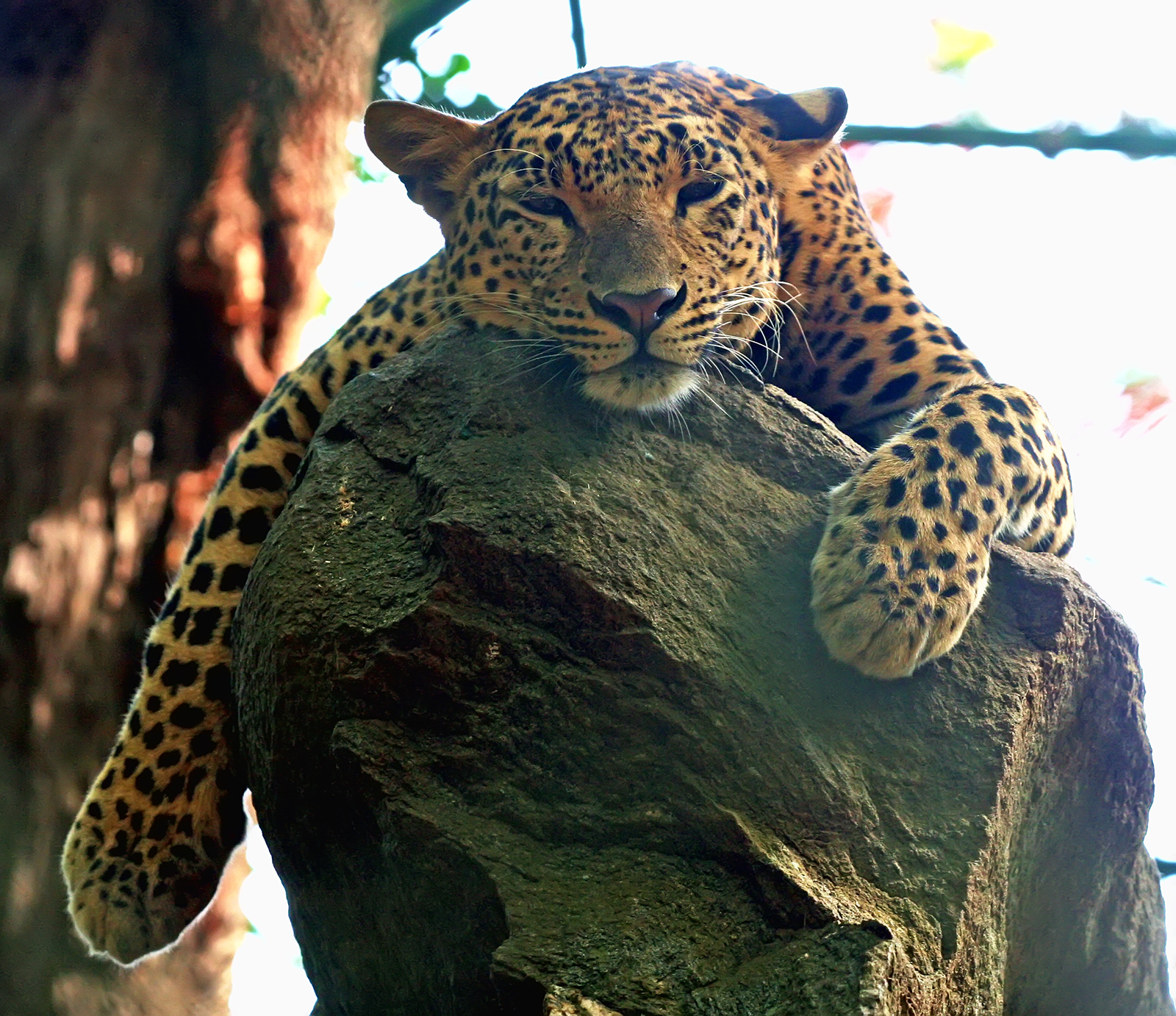
Leopard

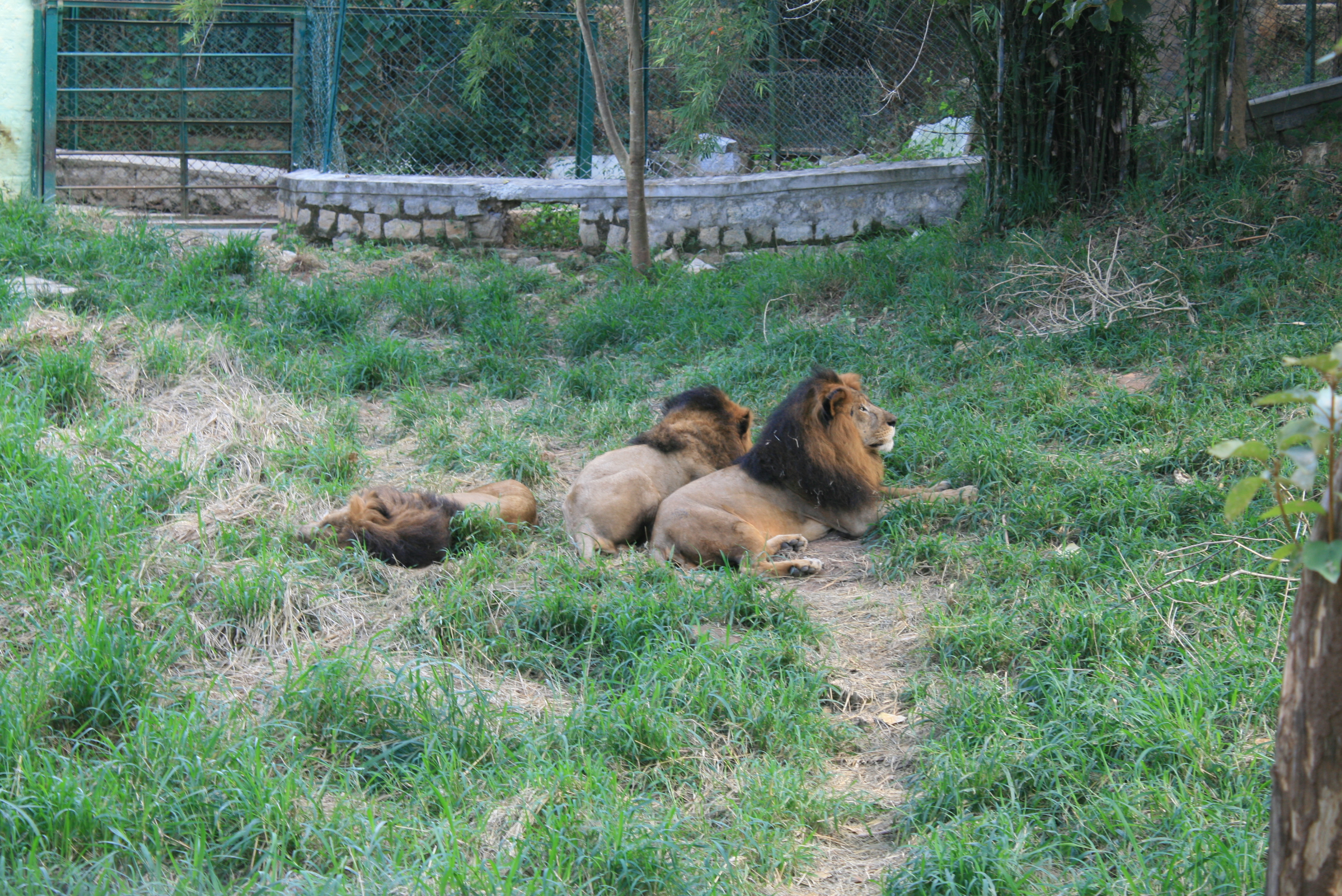
Lions

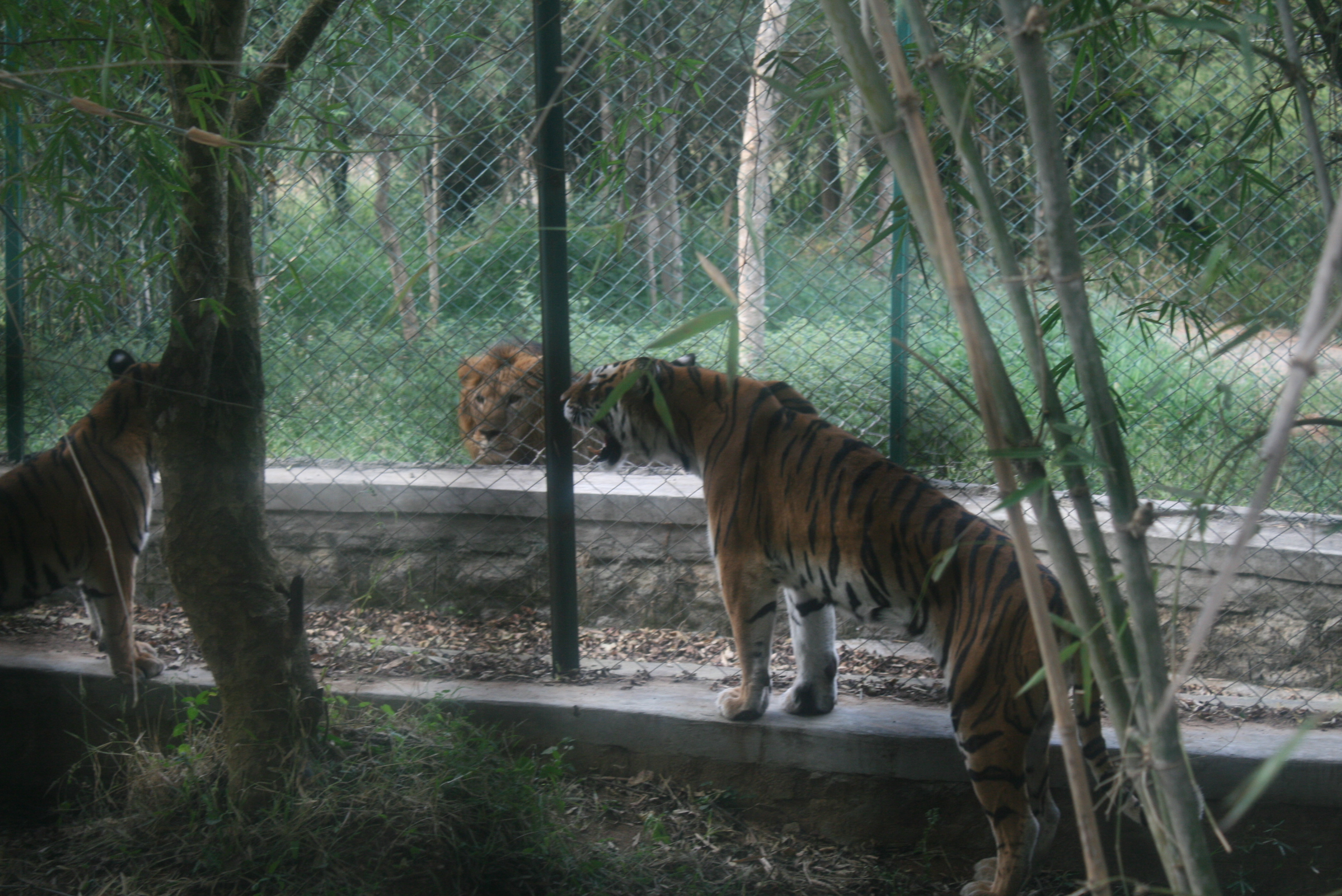
Tiger and lion staring at each other in Bannerghatta National Park

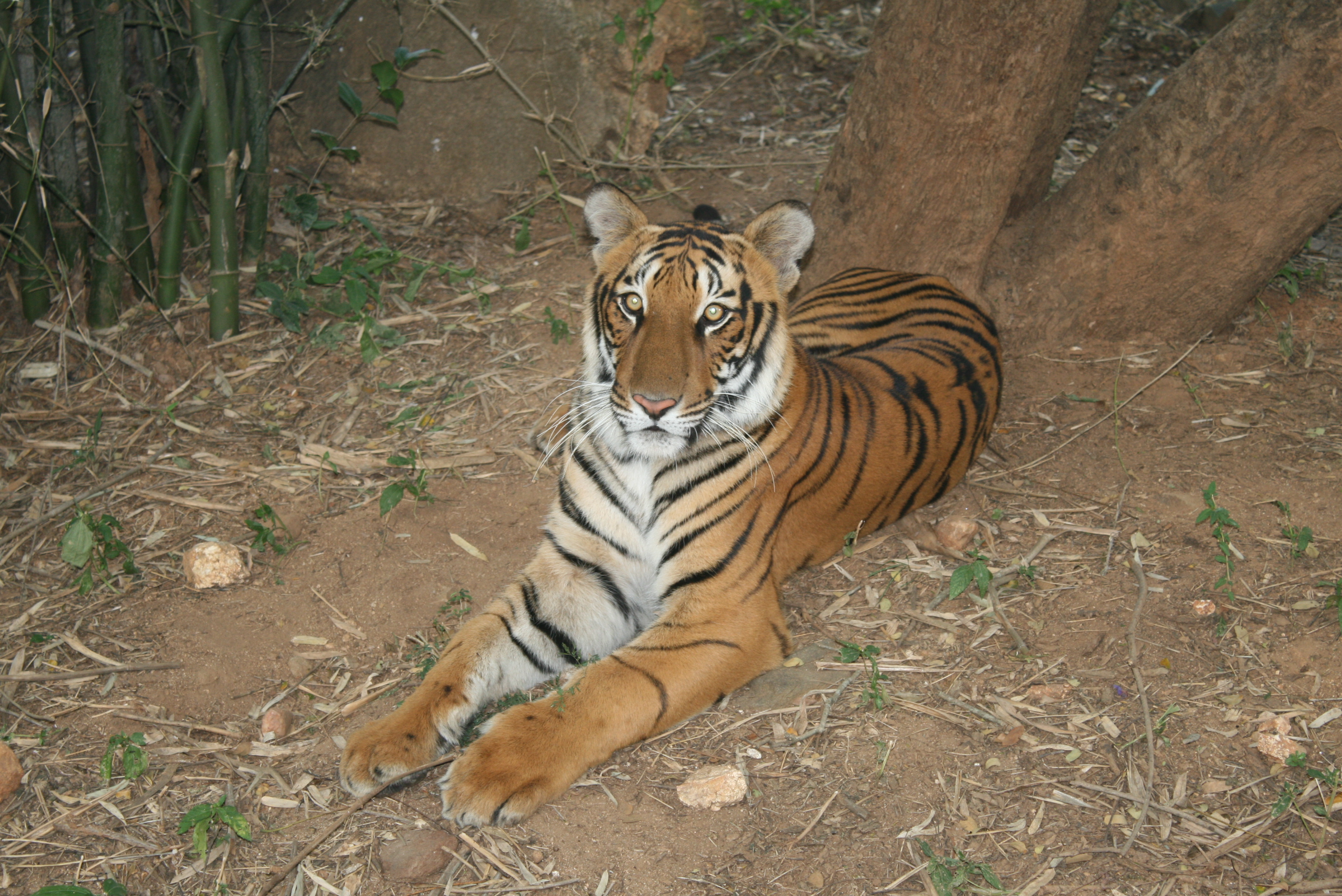
Tiger

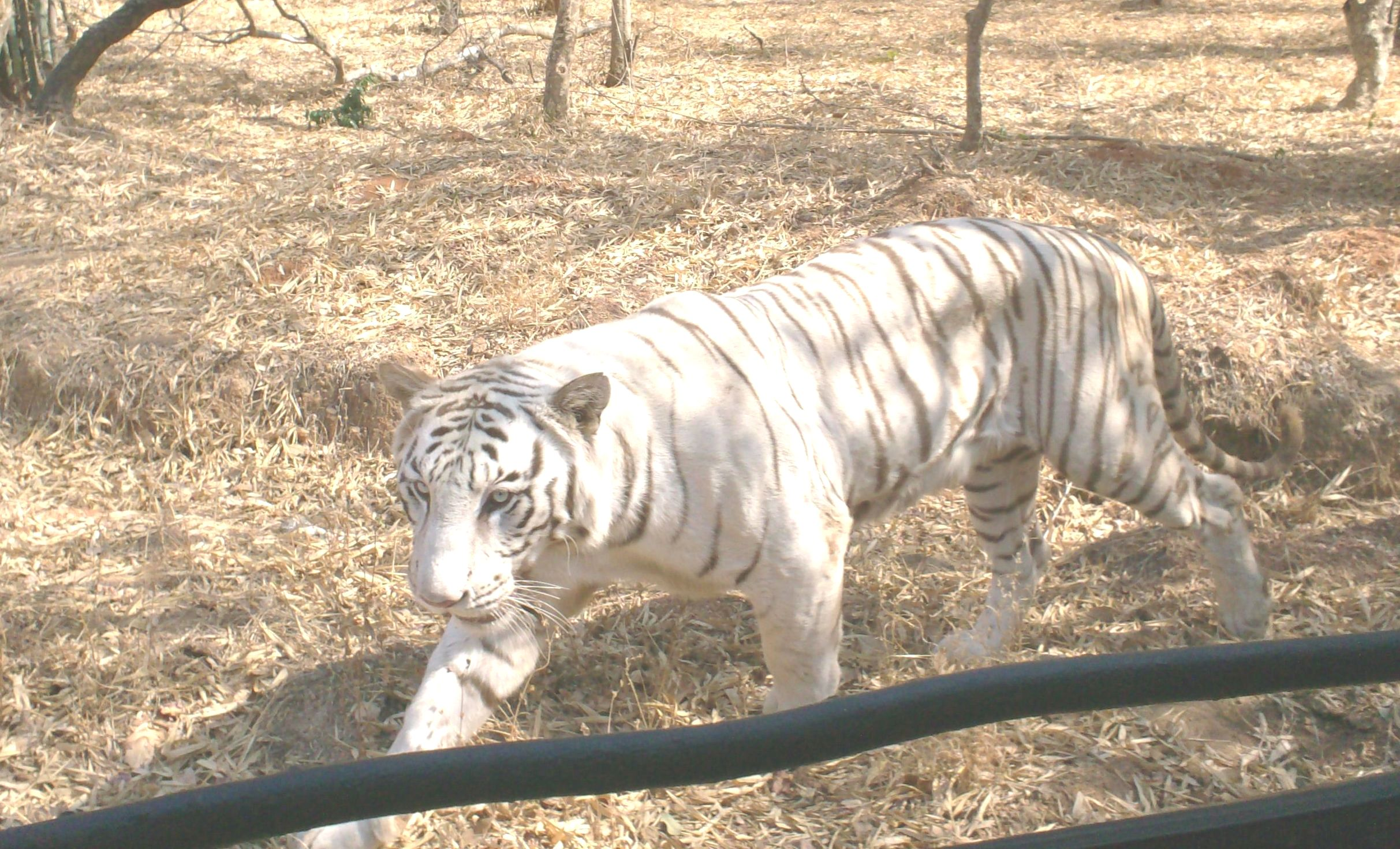
A white tiger of the Bannerghatta National Park

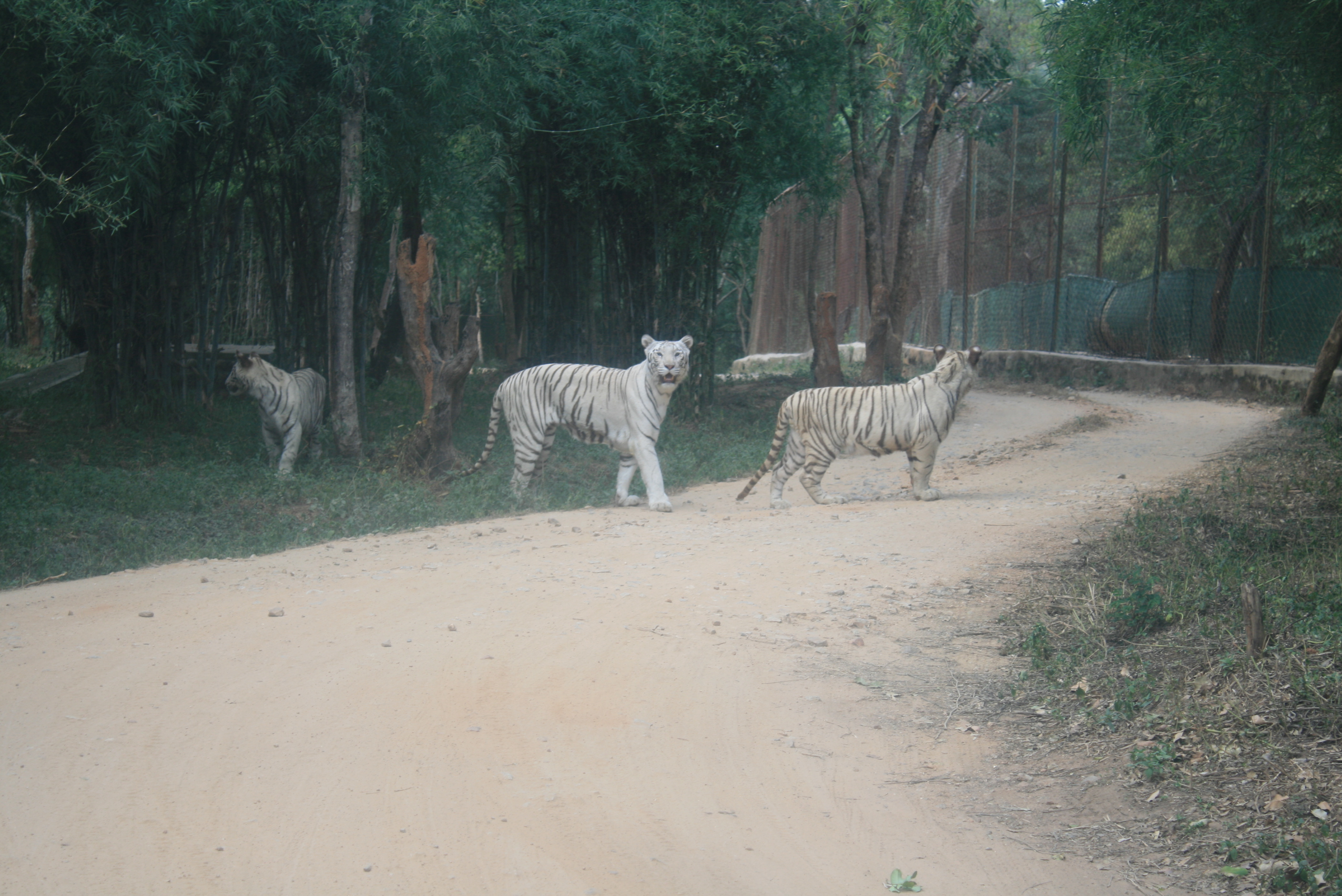
White tiger

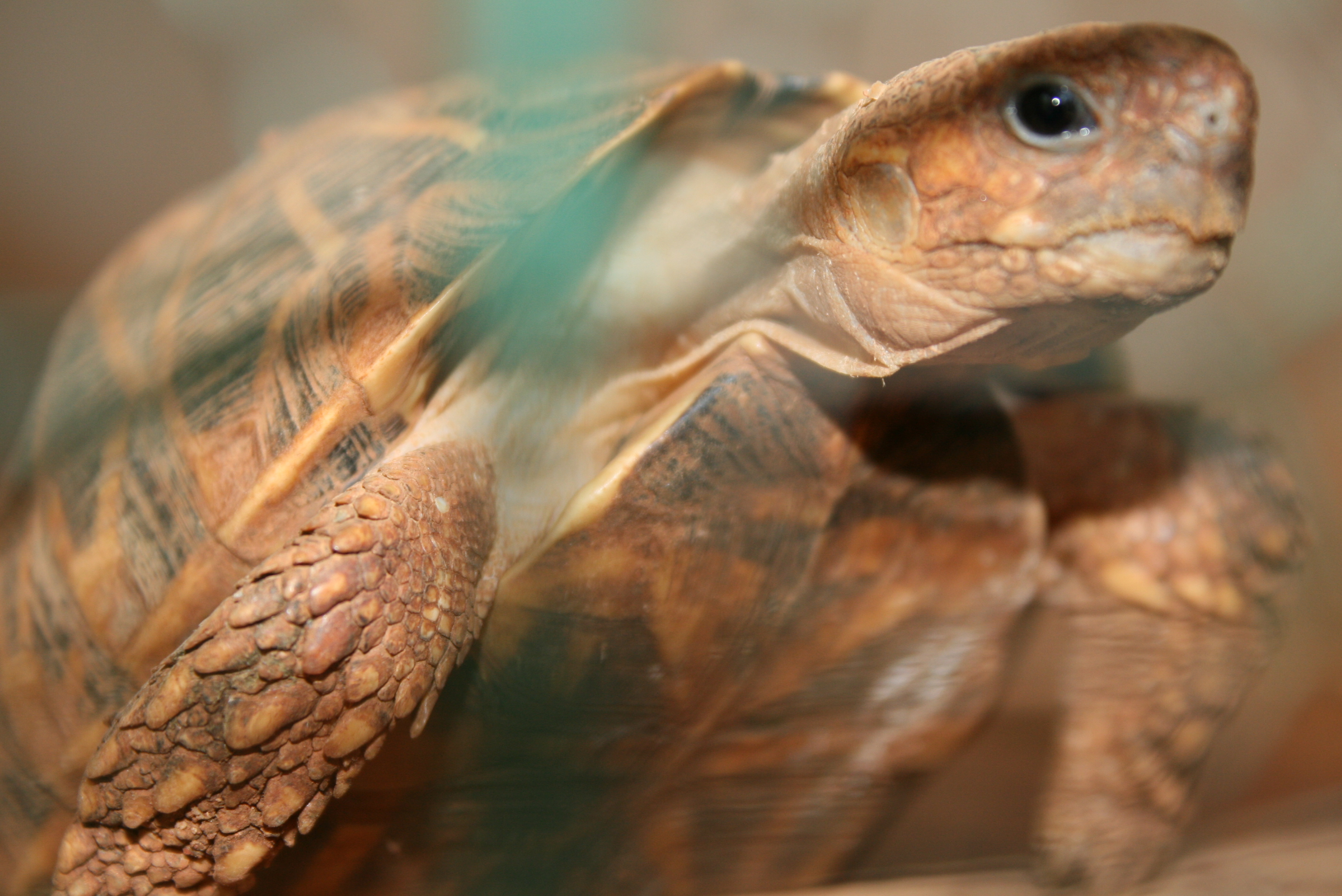
Tortoise

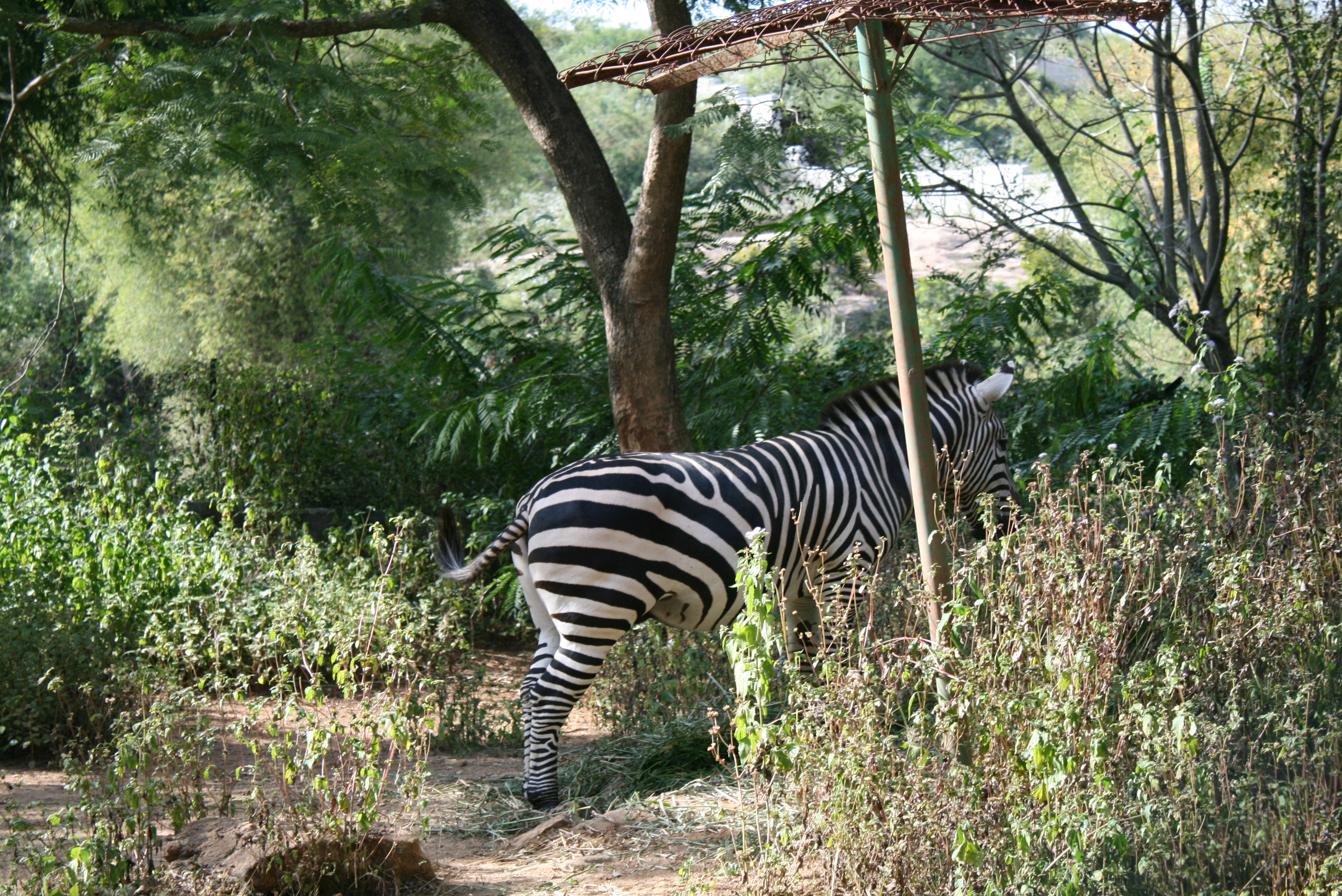
Zebra

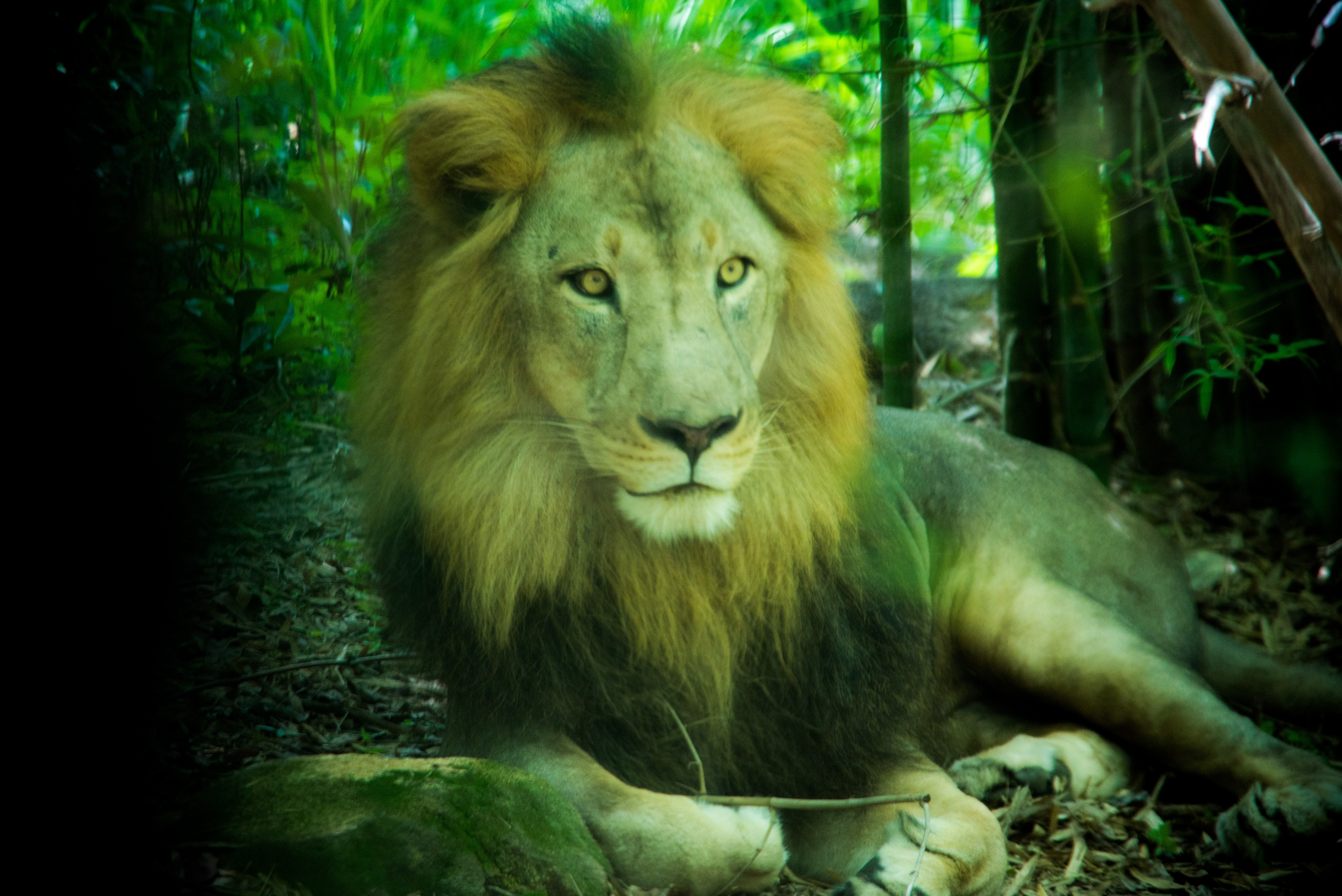
Lion

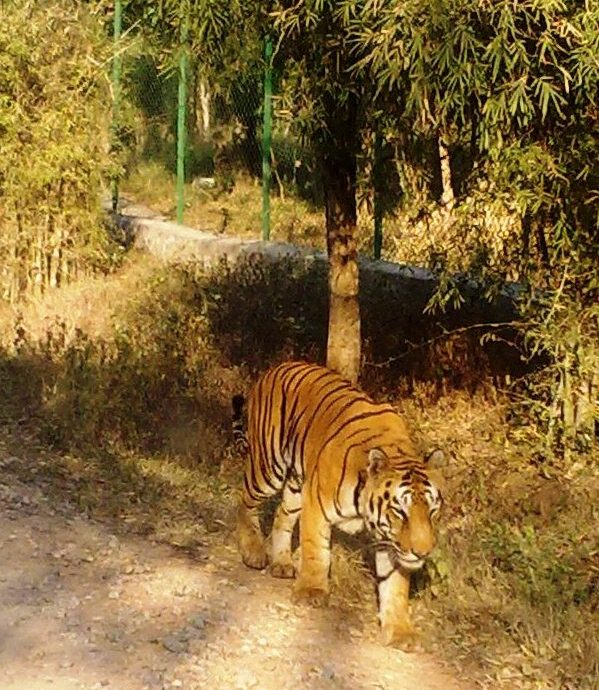
Bengal tiger

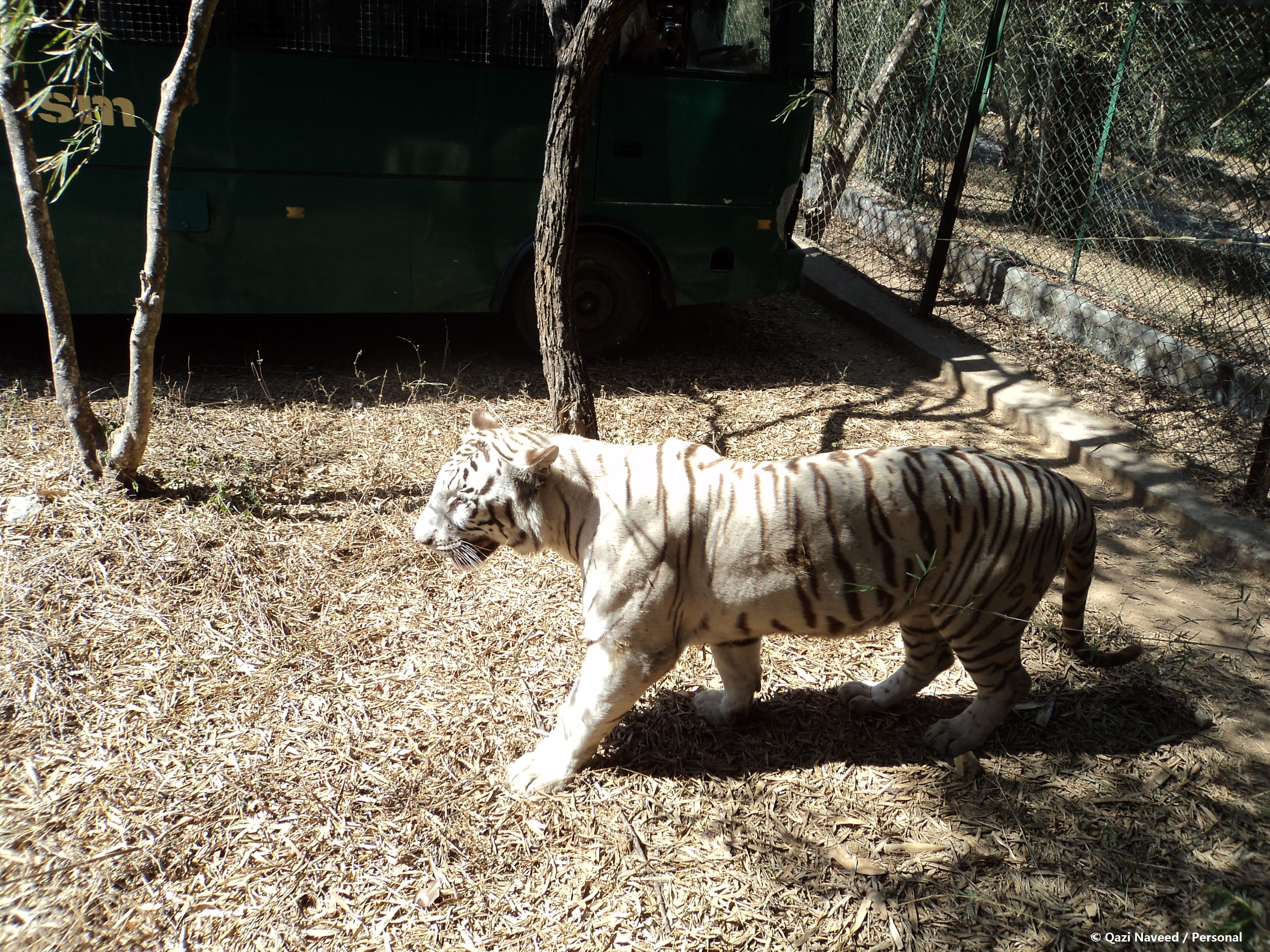
White tiger

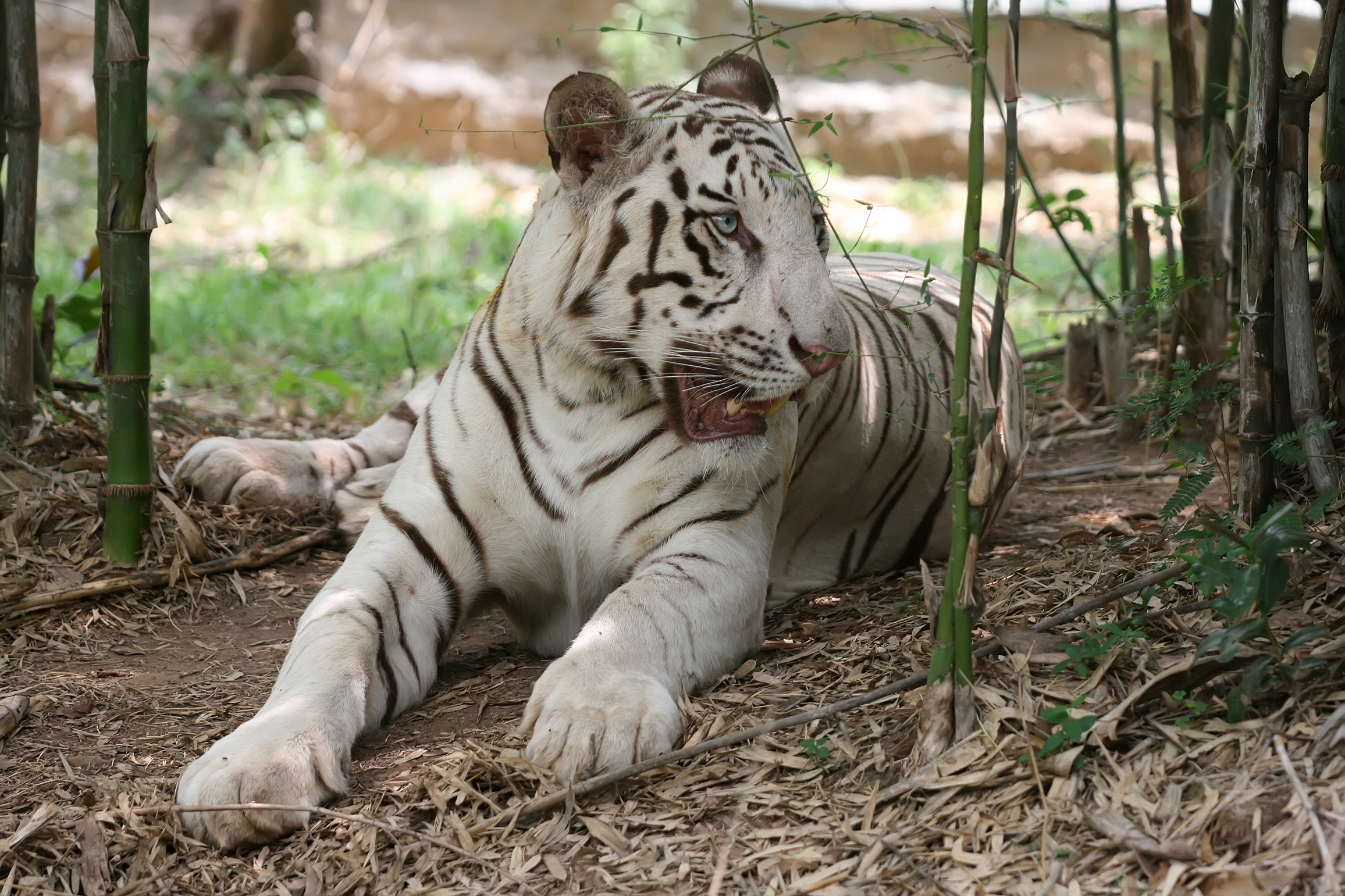
White tiger

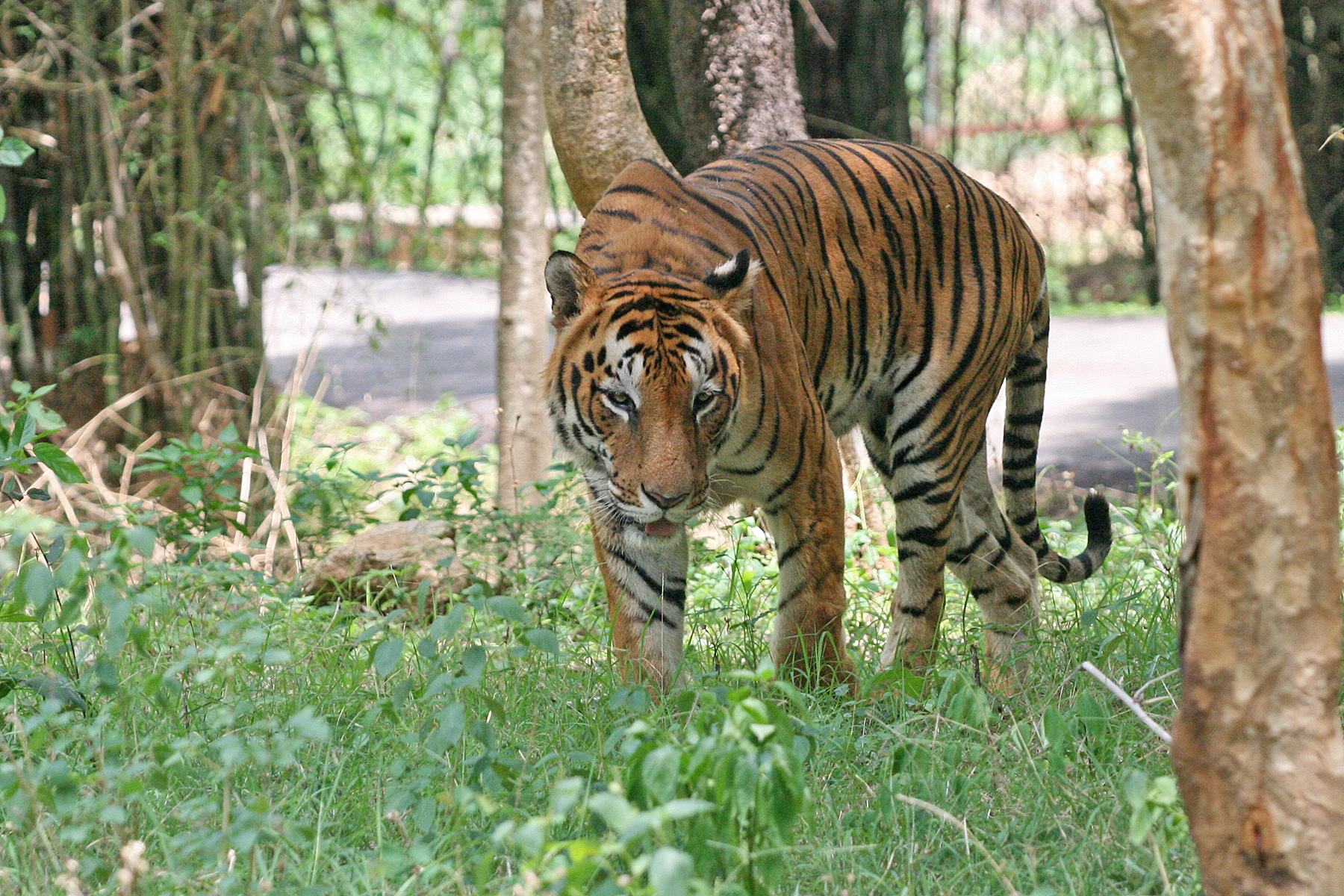
Bengal tiger

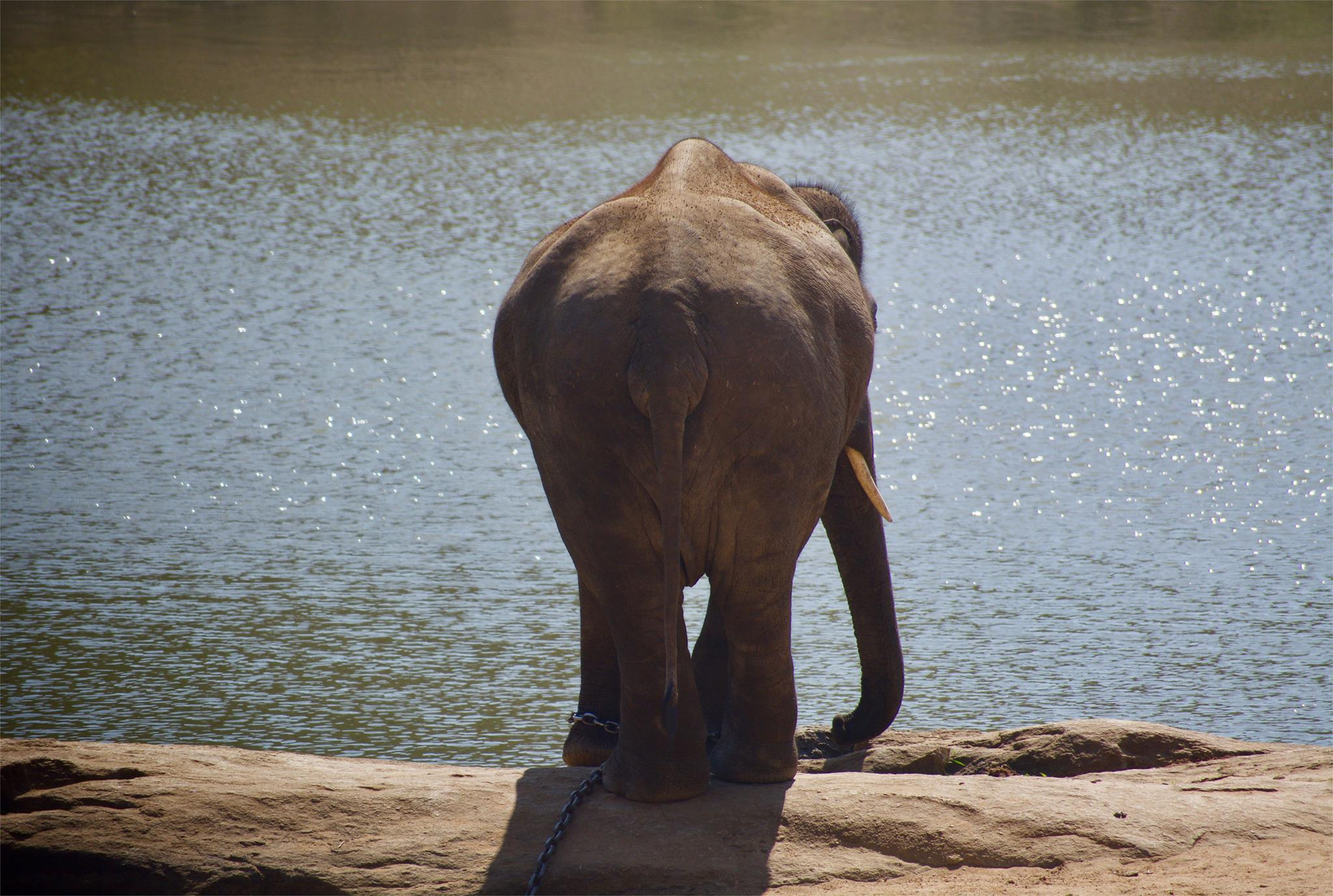
Elephant at lakeside

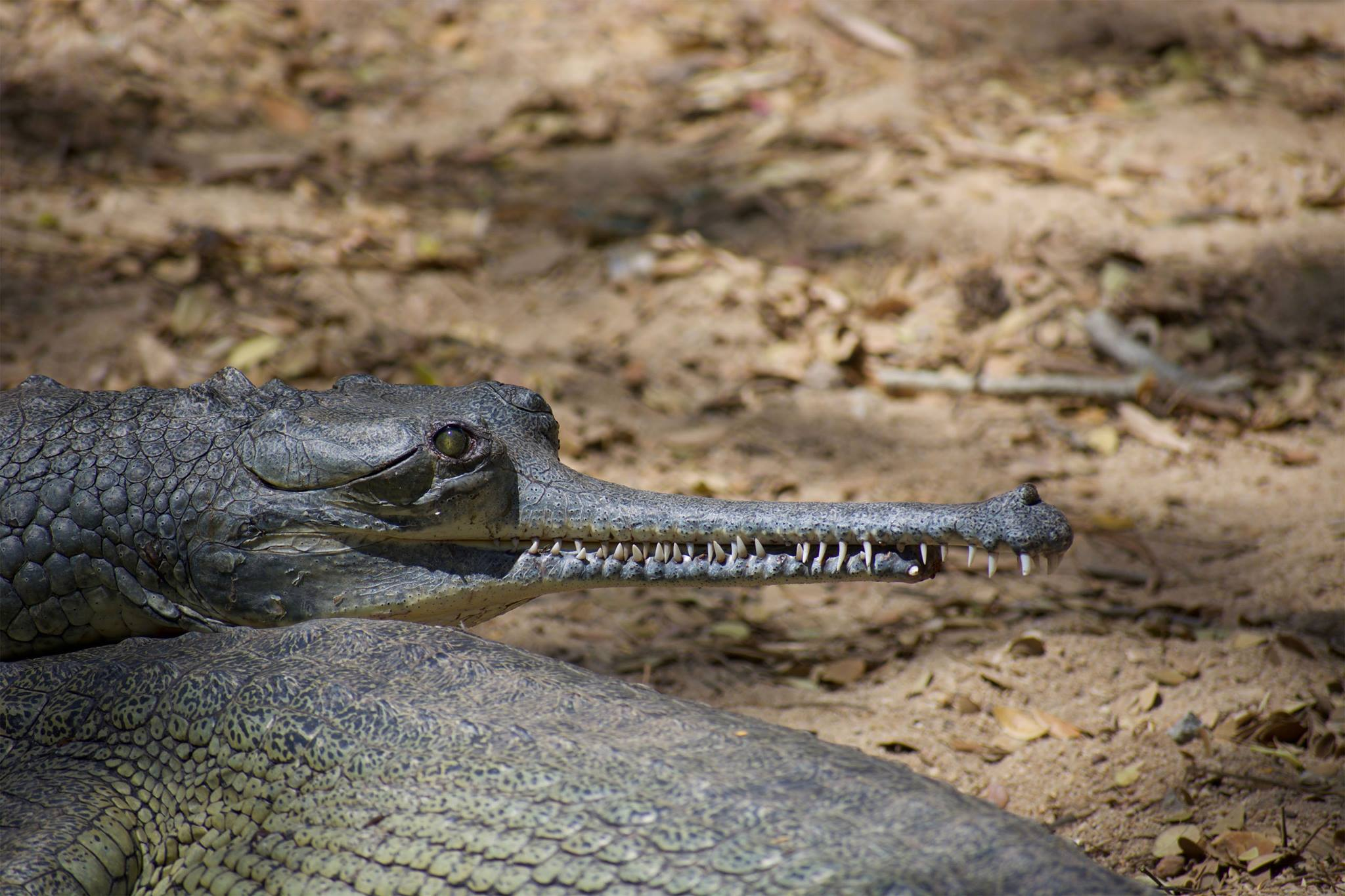
Gharial

Crocodiles

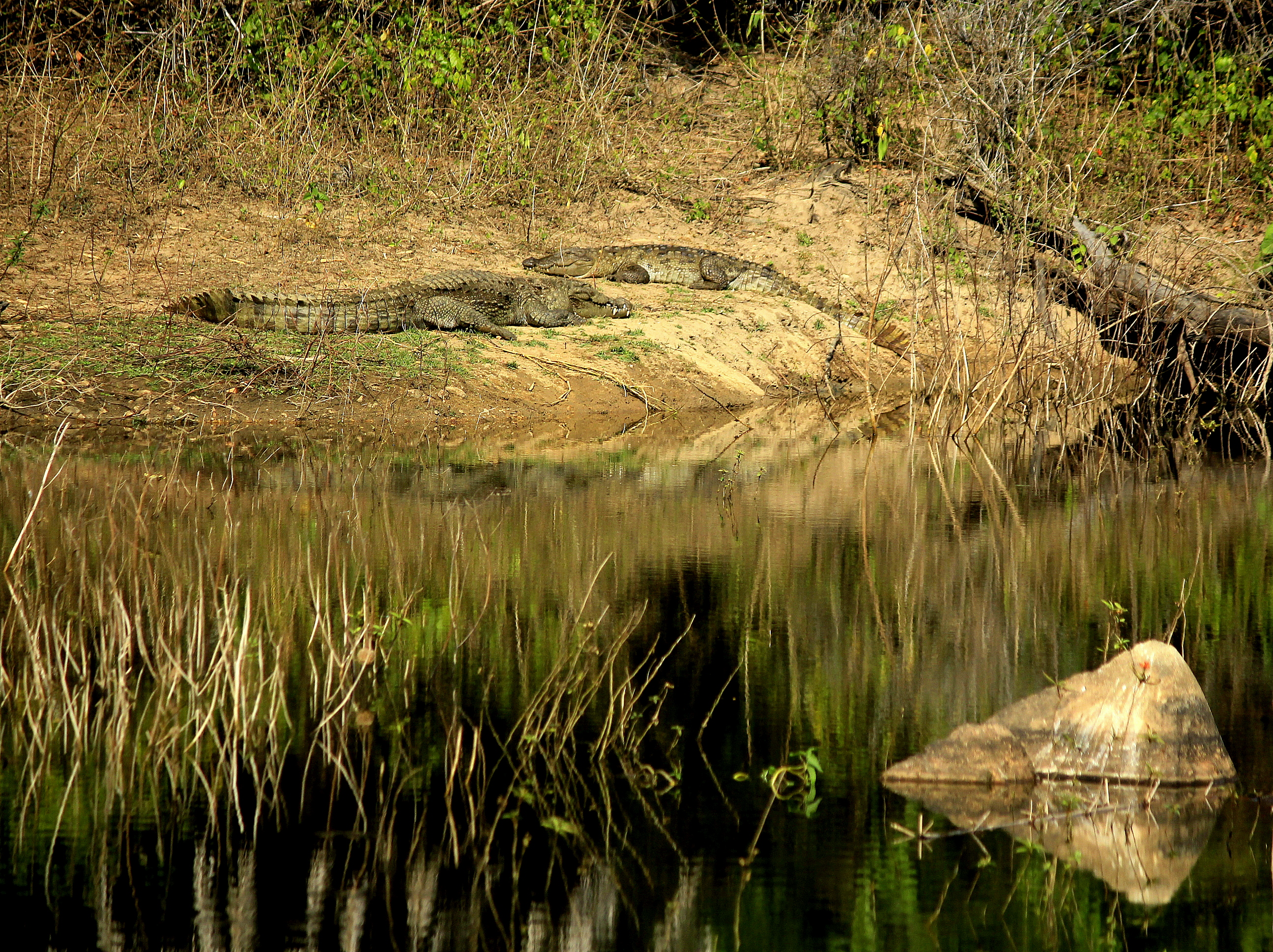
Indian Crocodile in the Lake of Bannerghatta National Park

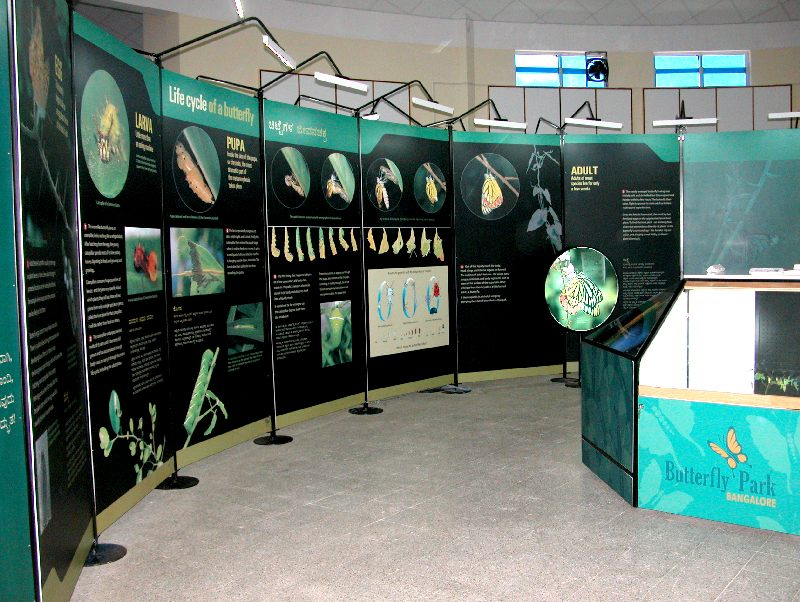
Interpretation center

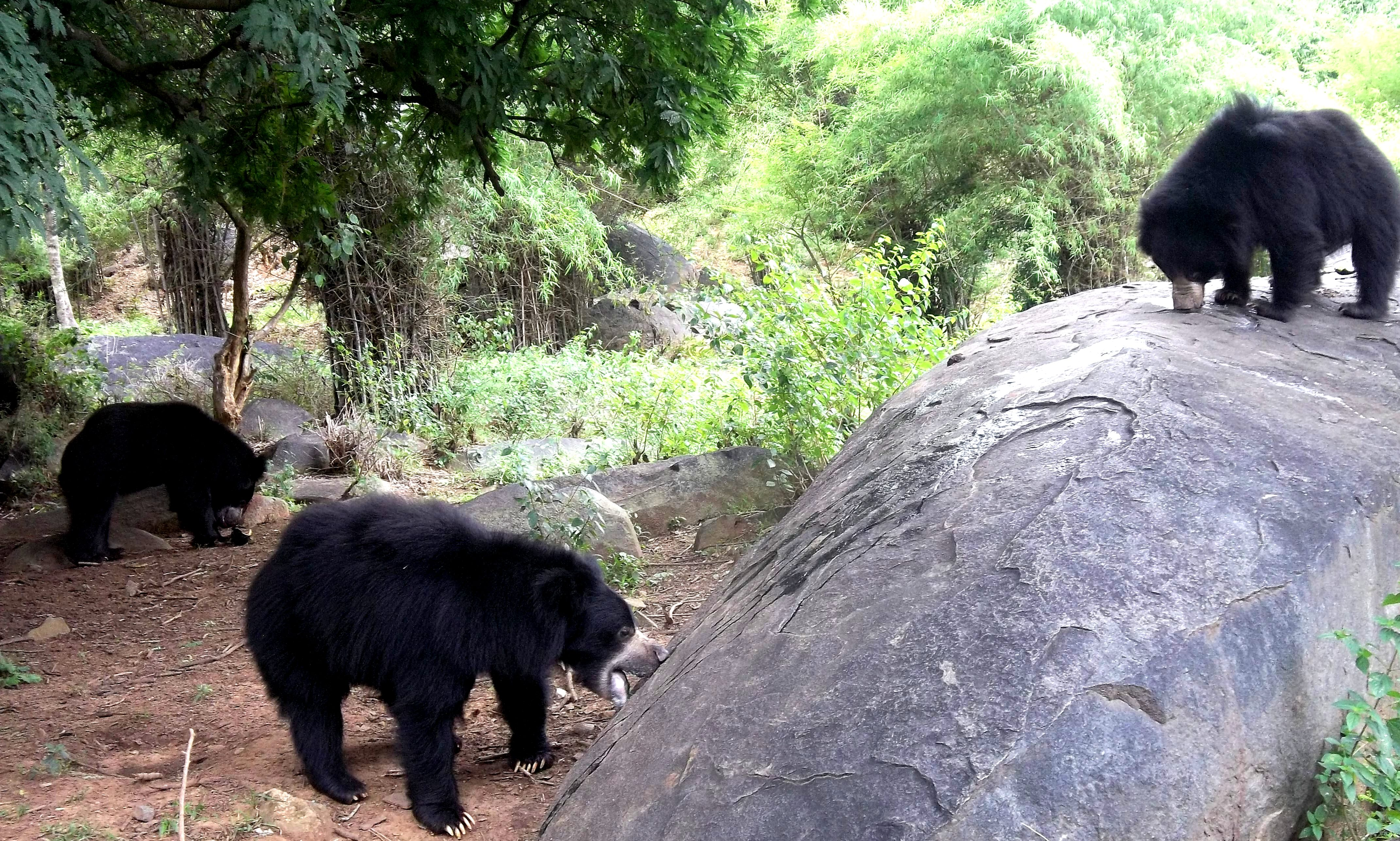
Bears

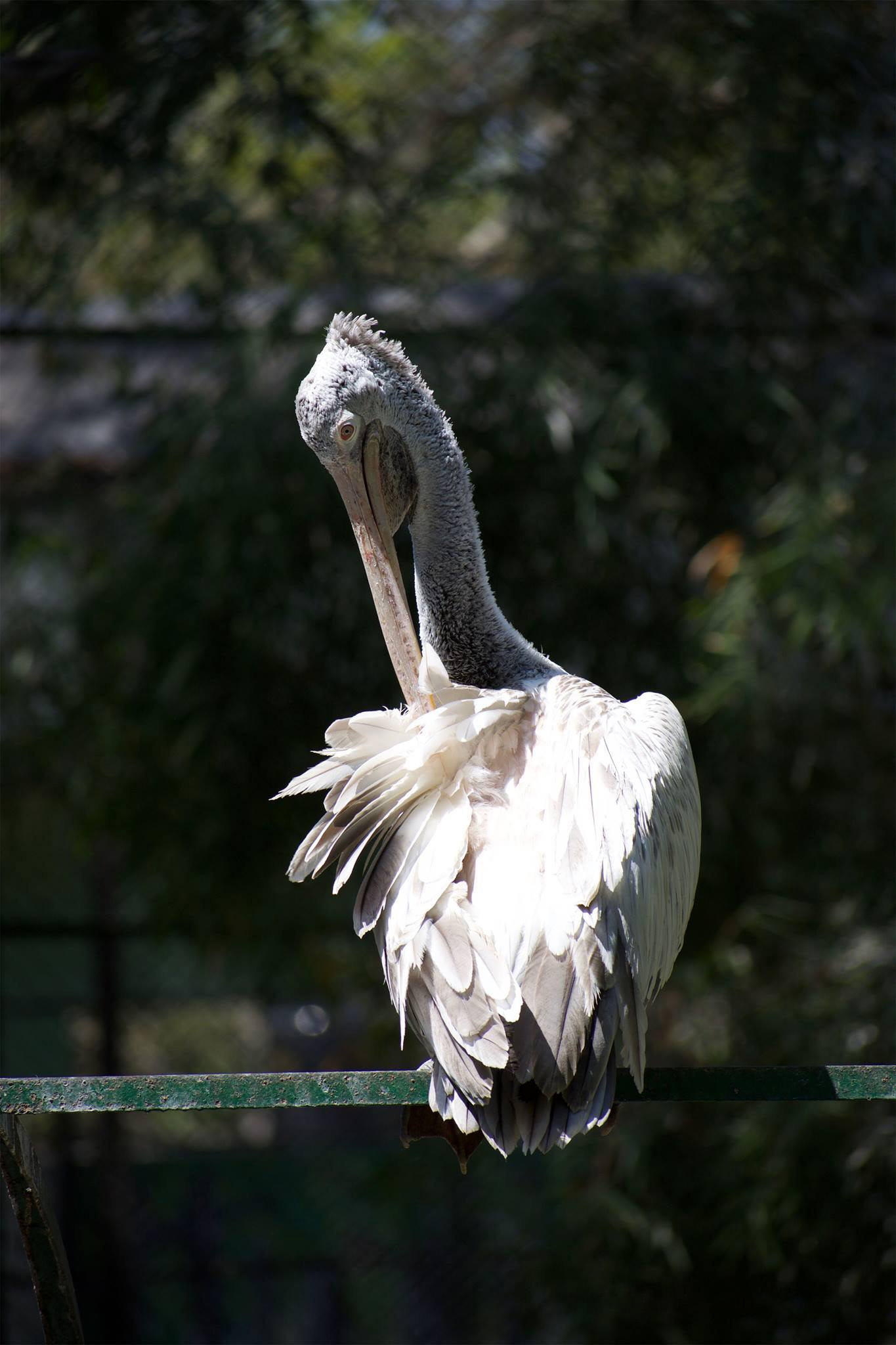
Pelican bird

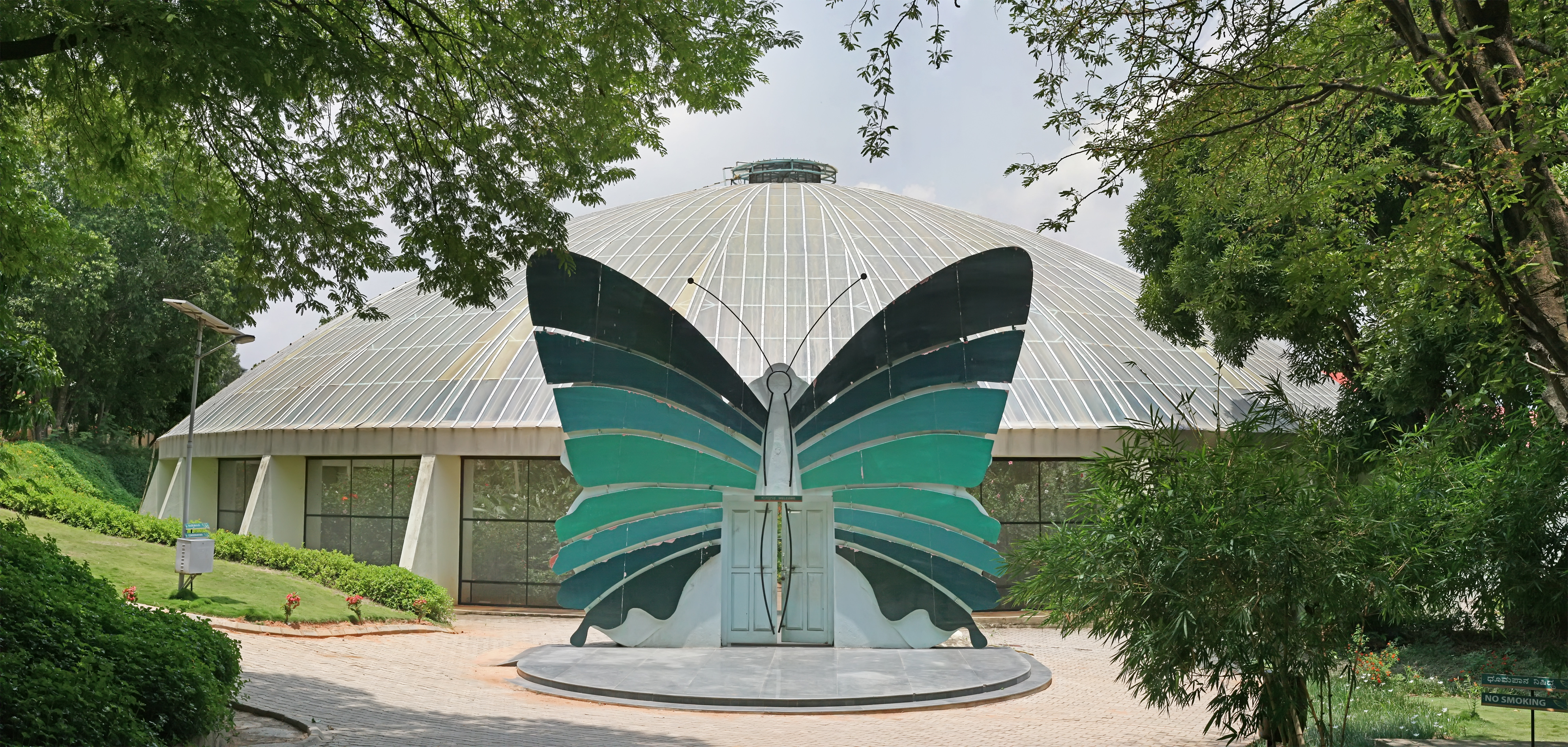
Entrance to the butterfly enclosure

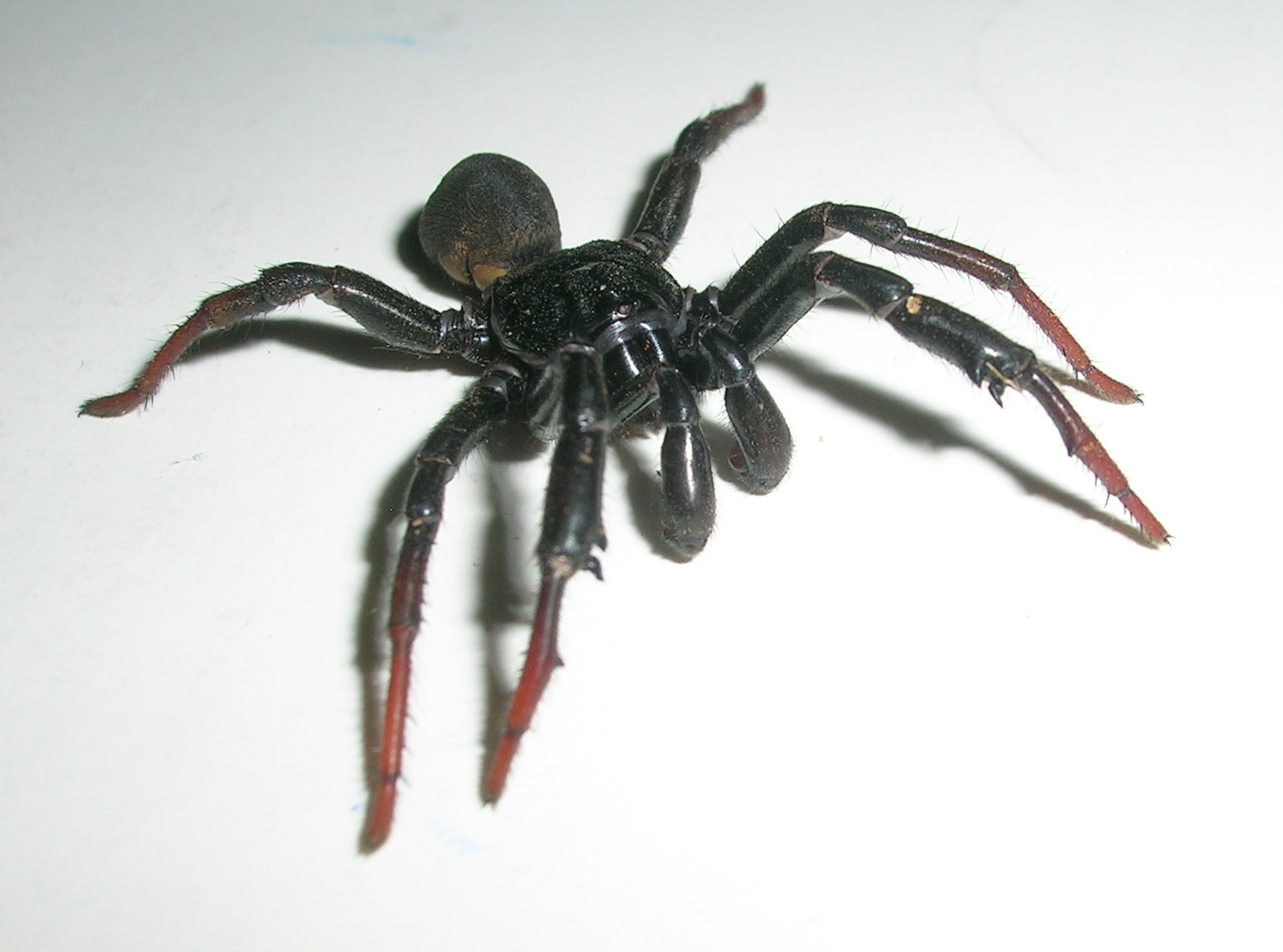
Rare spider (family Idiopidae) found in Bannerghatta

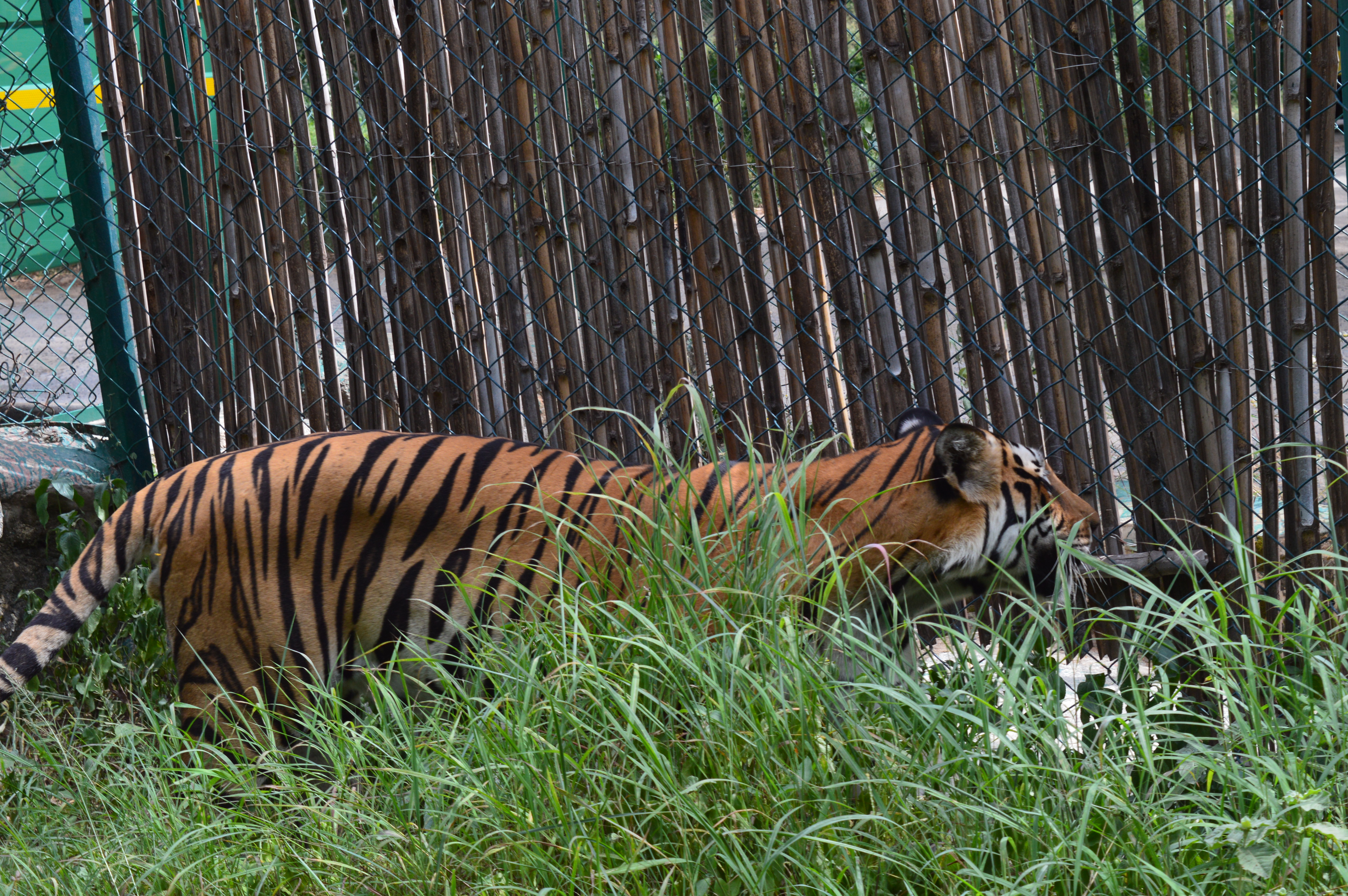
Bannerghata National Park - Tiger Safari

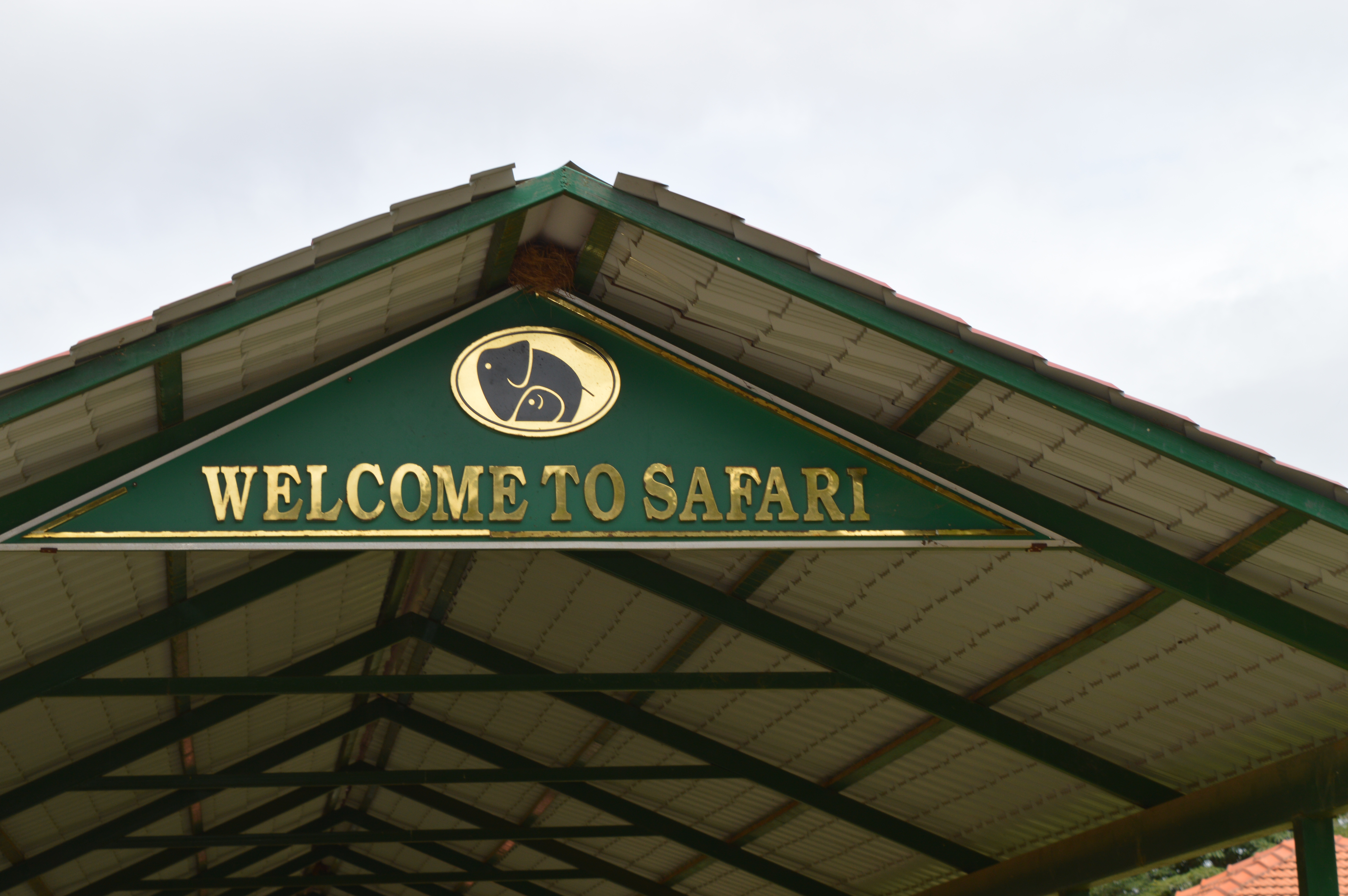
Bannerghata National Park - Safari Entry

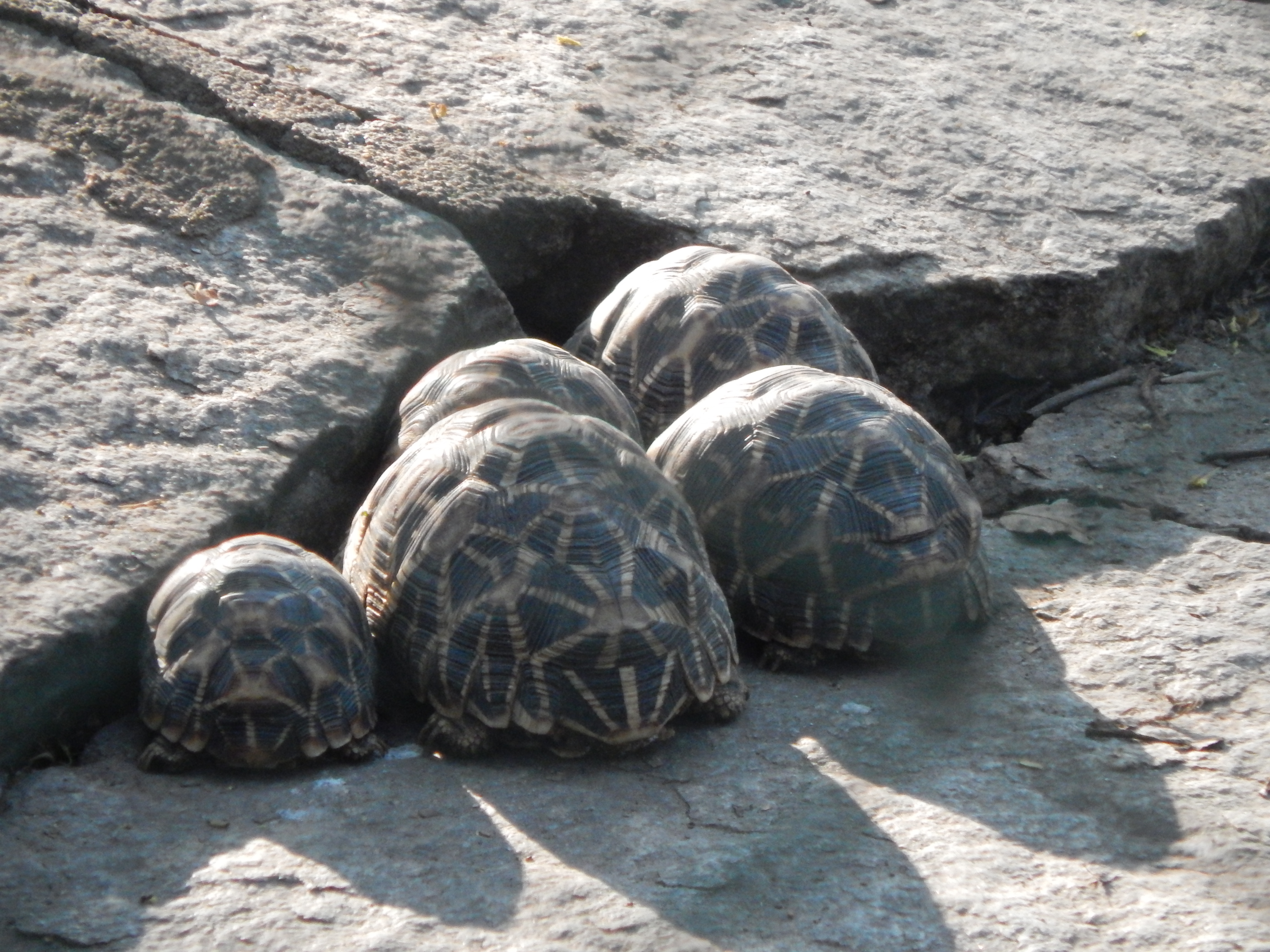
Happy Family

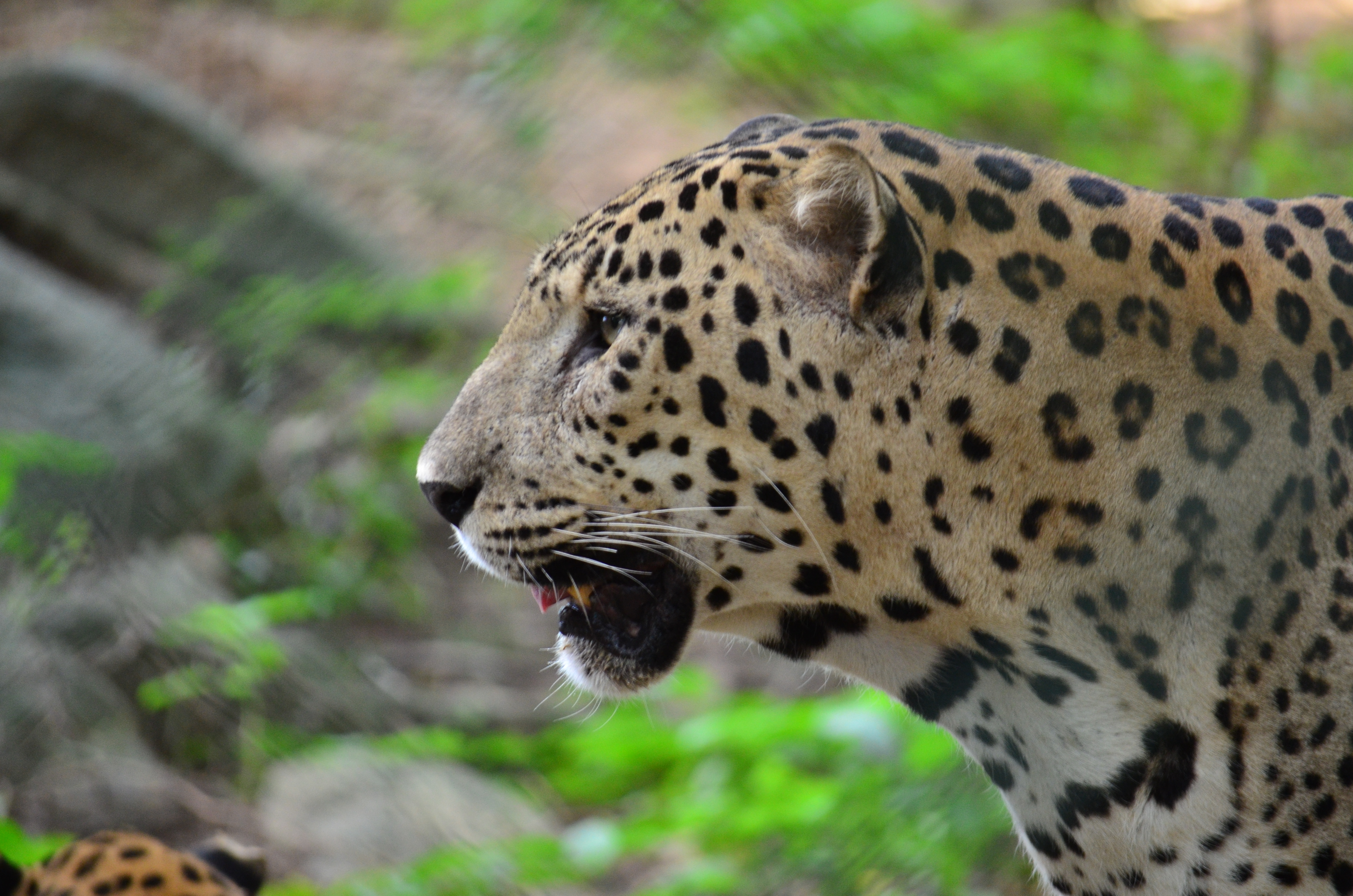
Leopards

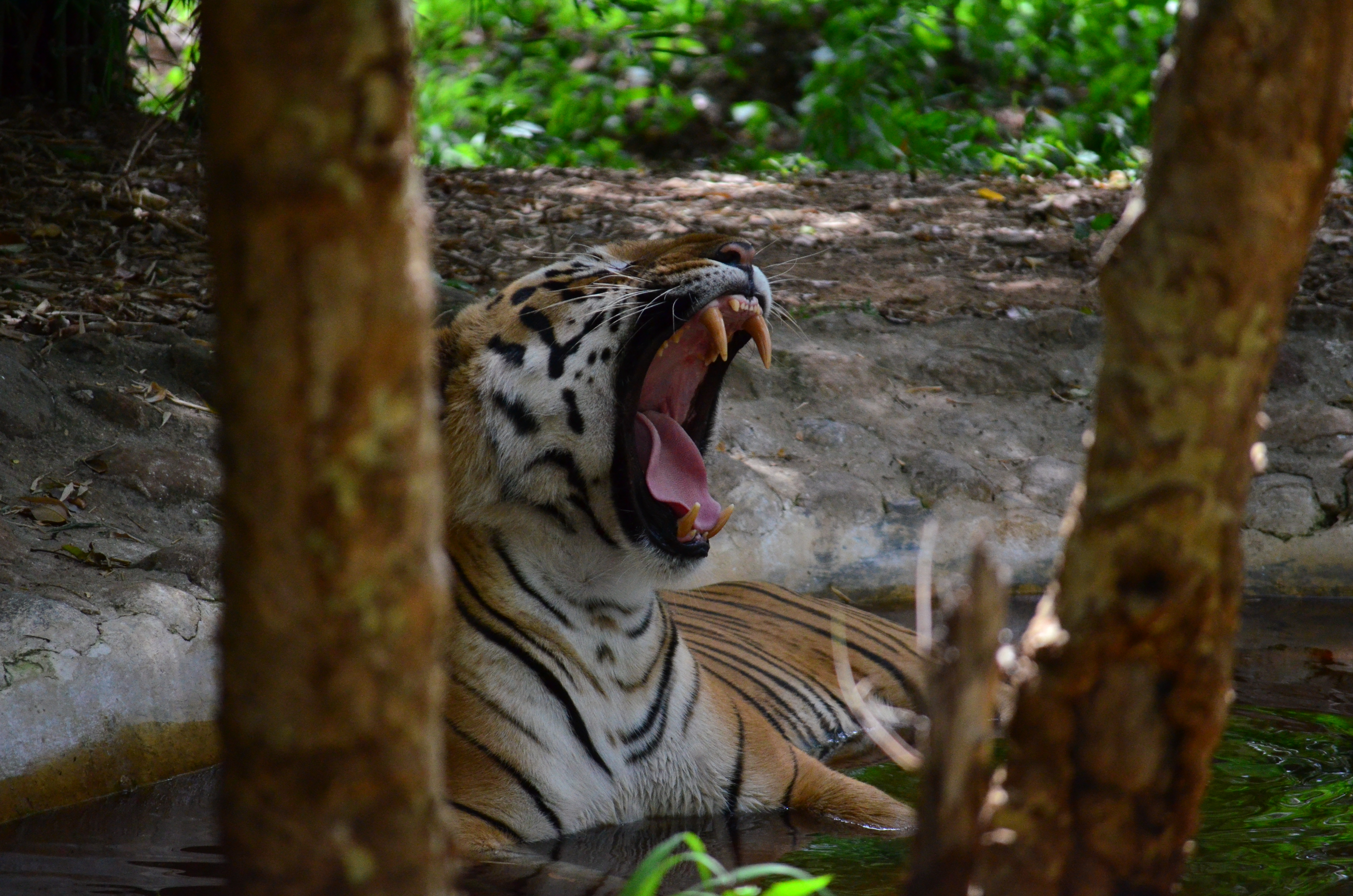
Tiger

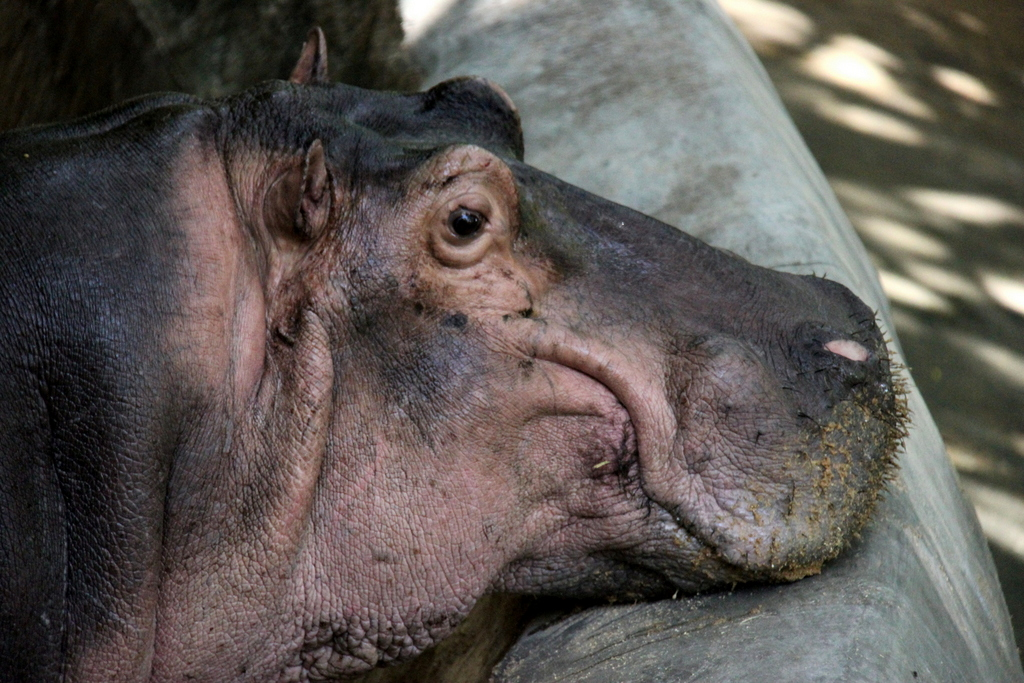

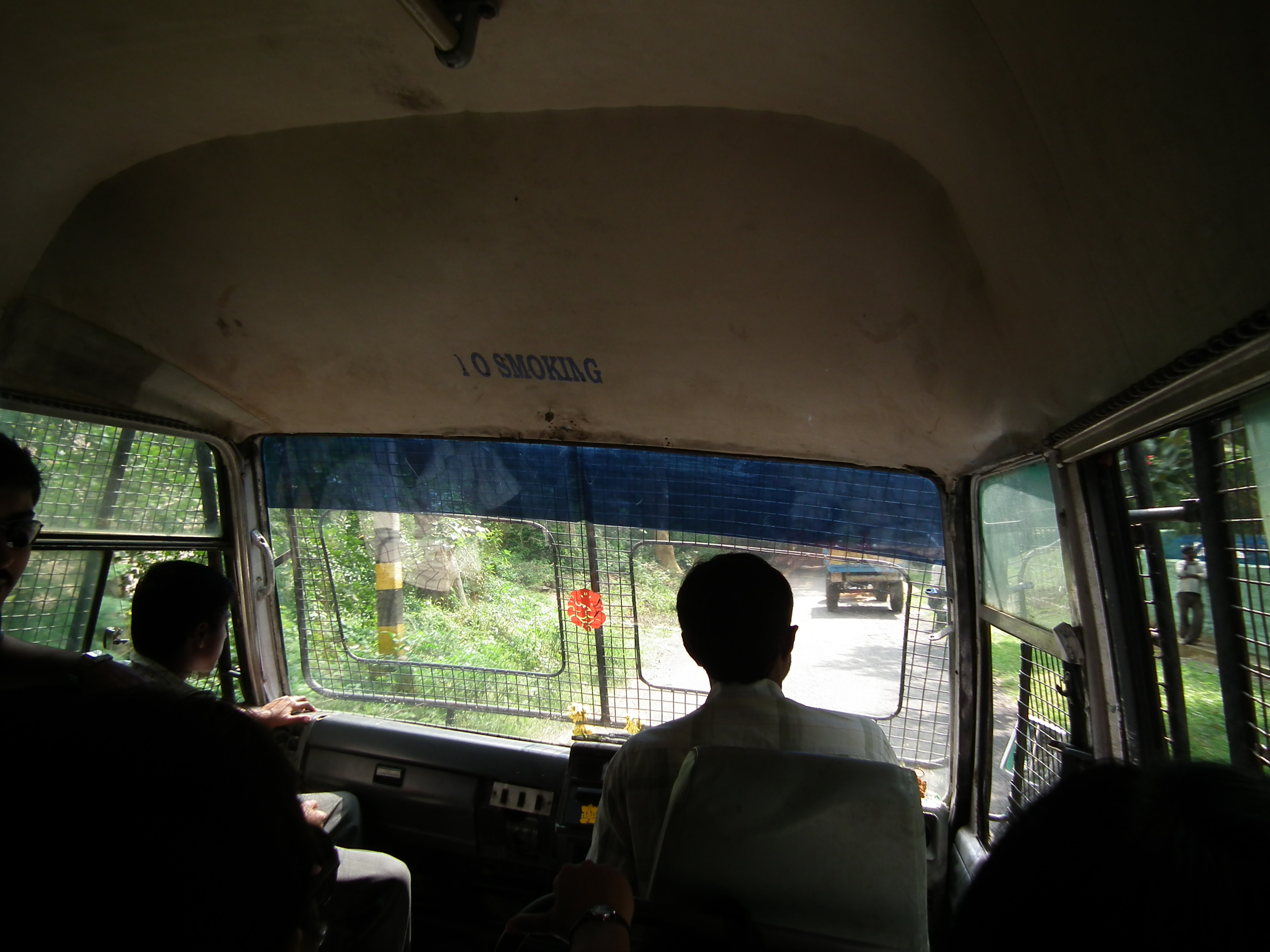

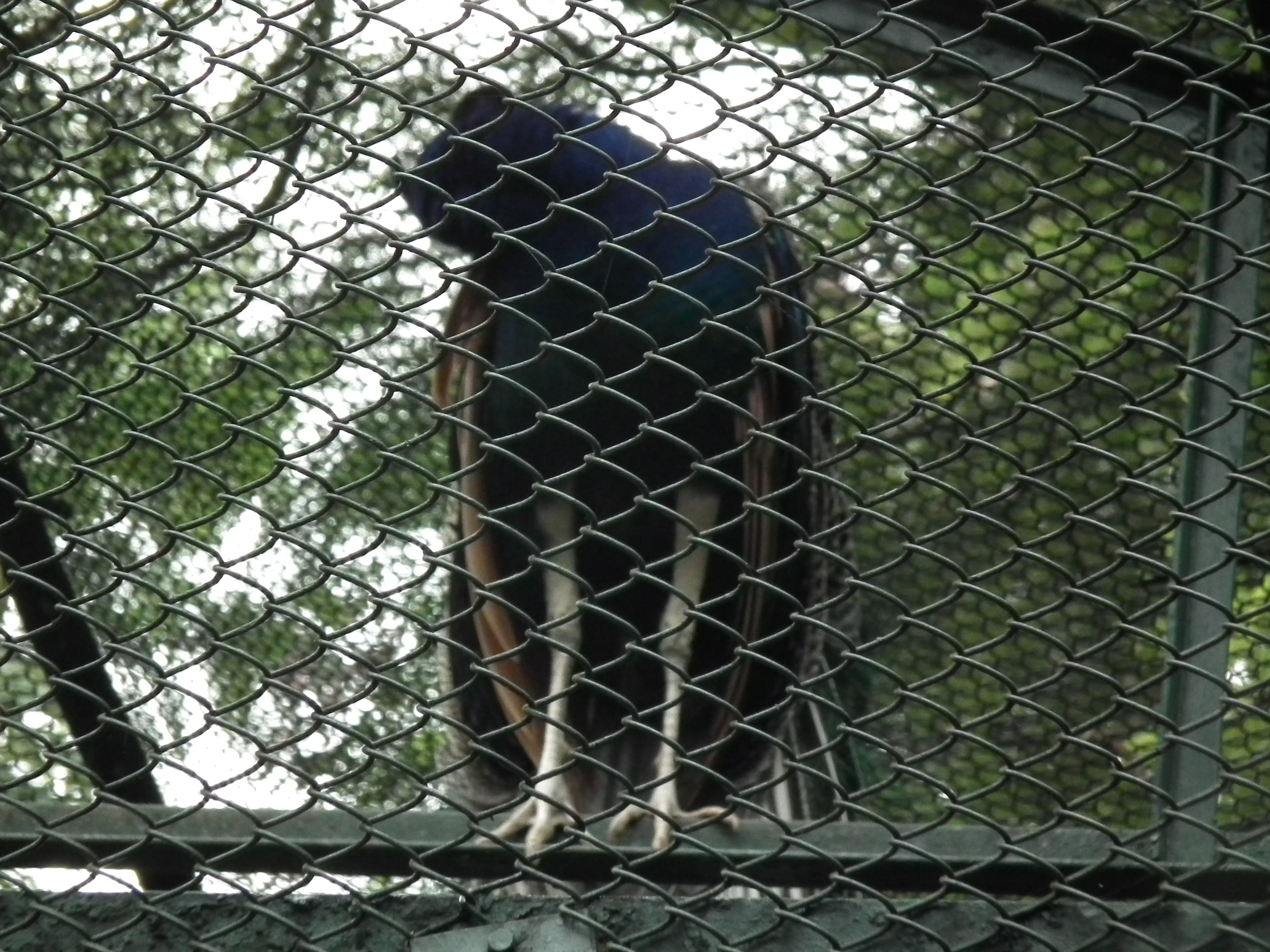
