= Farelli =

Farelli is an Italian surname. Notable people with the surname include:

- Cary Farelli (born 1957), Italian ice hockey player
- Giacomo Farelli (1629–1706), Italian painter
- Simone Farelli (born 1983), Italian footballer

== See also ==
- Fanelli
