= Alva Noë =

American philosopher (born 1964)

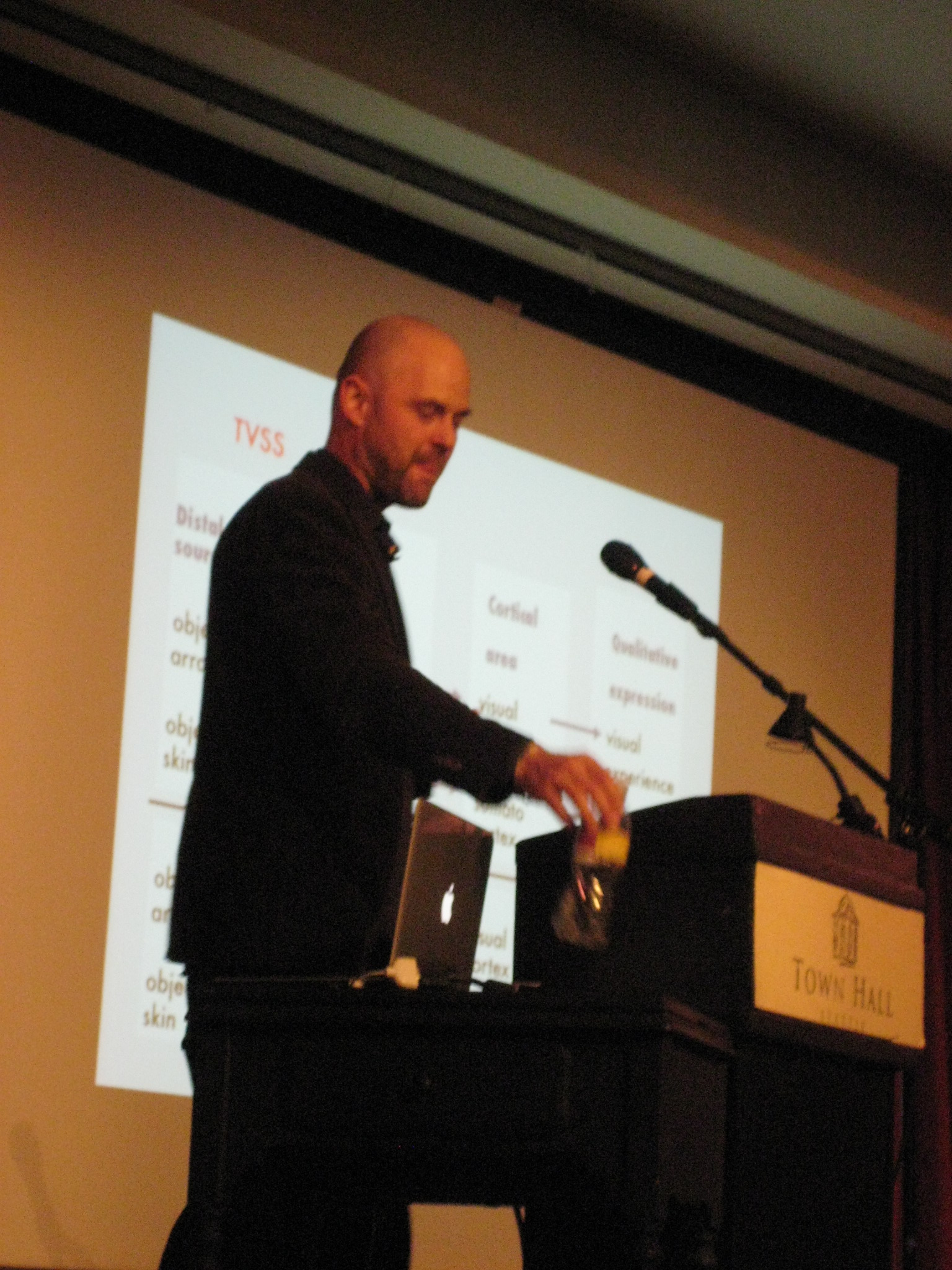
- Occupations: Philosopher, cognitive scientist

Education
- Education: Columbia University (BA); University of Oxford (BPhil); Harvard University (PhD)

Philosophical work
- Era: Contemporary philosophy
- Region: Western philosophy
- School: Analytic phenomenology
- Institutions: University of California, Berkeley; University of California, Santa Cruz
- Main interests: Cognitive science, philosophy of mind, analytic phenomenology
- Notable ideas: Sensorimotor profile
- Website: www.alvanoe.com

Alva Noë (/ˈælvə ˈnoʊ.eɪ/; born 1964) is an American philosopher. He is Professor of Philosophy at the University of California, Berkeley. The focus of his work is the theory of perception and consciousness. In addition to these problems in cognitive science and the philosophy of mind, he is interested in analytic phenomenology, the theory of art, Ludwig Wittgenstein, enactivism, and the origins of analytic philosophy.

== Education ==
Noë received his B.A. from Columbia University. He also holds a B.Phil. from the University of Oxford and a Ph.D. from Harvard University.

== Philosophical work ==
Noë joined the University of California, Berkeley Department of Philosophy as an associate professor in 2003, where he was a member of the UC Berkeley Institute for Cognitive and Brain Sciences, serving as a core faculty member for the Program in Cognitive Science and the Center for New Media. During 2011–12, he was Distinguished Professor of Philosophy at the Graduate Center of the City University of New York.

Before coming to University of California, Berkeley, Noë was an assistant professor of philosophy at University of California, Santa Cruz. He has been a Post-doctoral Research Associate of the Center for Cognitive Studies at Tufts University, a visiting scholar at the Department of Logic and Philosophy of Science at University of California, Irvine and at the Institut Jean-Nicod (CNRS/EN/EHESS) in Paris, a McDonnell-Pew Visiting Fellow at the Oxford Center for Cognitive Neuroscience, and a visiting scholar at the Center for Subjectivity Research at the University of Copenhagen. Noë has been a recipient of a UC President's Fellowship in the Humanities and an ACLS/Ryskamp Fellowship, and in 2007–08 was a research fellow at the Wissenschaftskolleg zu Berlin.

Noë is the author of the books Strange Tools (2015),Varieties of Presence (2012), Out of Our Heads (2009), Action In Perception (MIT Press, 2004), and The Entanglement: How Art and Philosophy Make Us What We Are (Princeton University Press, 2023). He is the co-editor of Vision and Mind: Selected Readings in the Philosophy of Perception (MIT Press, 2002) and the author of Is the Visual World a Grand Illusion? (Imprint Academic, 2002). In Action In Perception, Noë puts forth the notion of the sensorimotor profile. Externalism about the mind and mental content is a pervasive theme in his work.

== Personal life ==
Noë is the son of the architect, sculptor and restaurateur Hans Noë, the former proprietor of the Fanelli Cafe. His mother Judith Baldwin is a ceramicist. His brother Sasha is a sculptor and has taken over running the Fanelli Cafe.
