= Fanelli Cafe =

Historic restaurant in New York, United States

Coordinates: 40.724555°N 73.998820°W

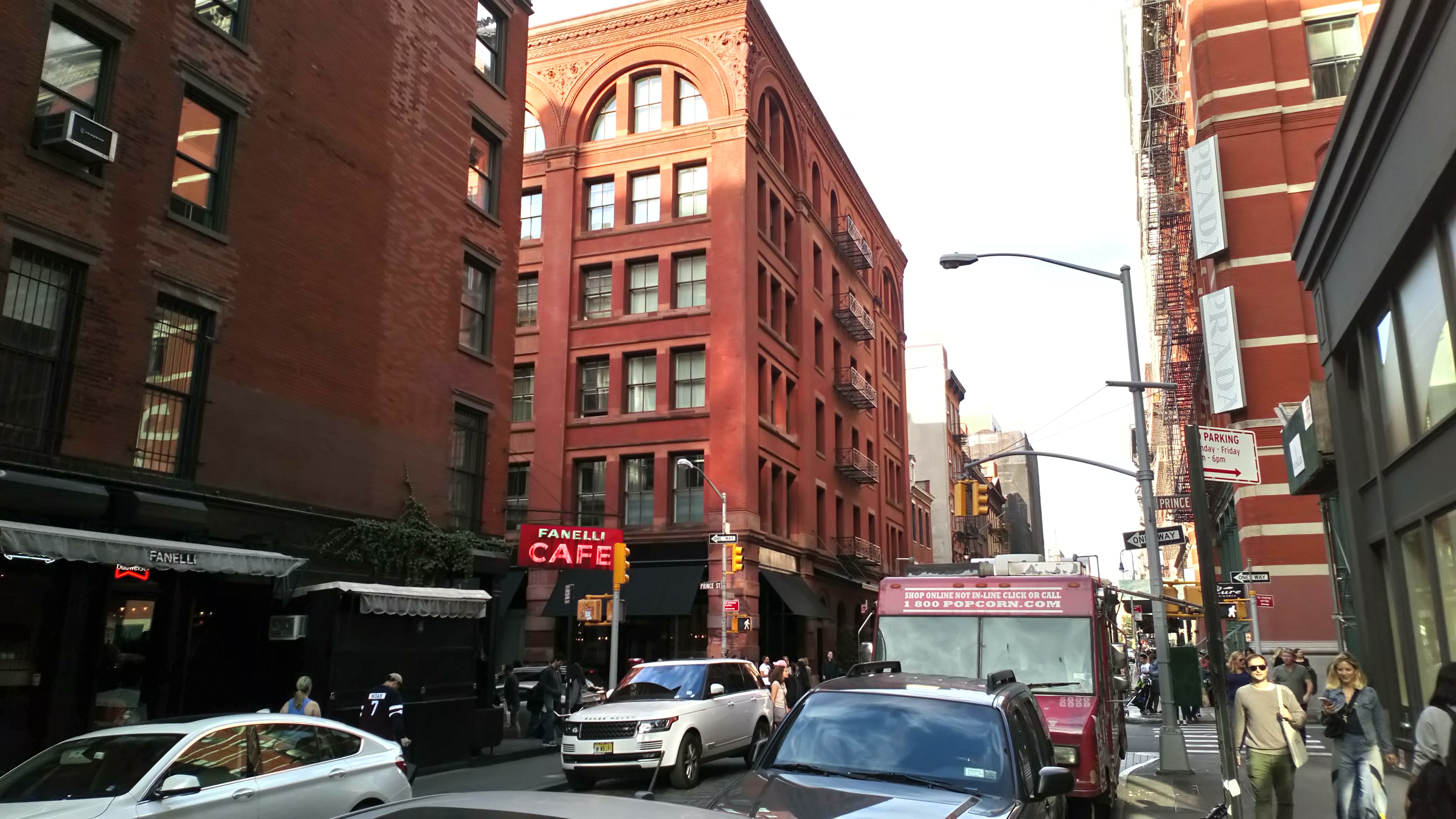
- Industry: Restaurant / bar
- Founded: 1847 (food and drink establishment); 1922: Fanelli Cafe
- Headquarters: Manhattan, New York City
- Key people: Harry Green; Nicolas Gerdes; Michael G. Fanelli; Hans Noë; Sasha Noë

Fanelli Cafe is a historic New York City restaurant and bar considered the city's second-oldest food-and-drink establishment in the same locale, having operated under various owners at 94 Prince Street since 1847. It served as a gathering place for artists during the transition of Manhattan's SoHo neighborhood from a manufacturing area to an arts community.

== History ==
Erected in 1847, the retail site at 94 Prince Street, in the SoHo neighborhood of New York City's Manhattan borough, operated as a grocery store from that year to 1863. It then became a saloon for two years before becoming again a grocery for a year, and reverting to a saloon in 1867. Various owners followed, with Harry Green operating it as the Prince Cafe from 1905 to 1922. That year, Michael Fanelli purchased the business and rechristened it Fanelli Cafe. In 1982, his family sold it to Hans Noë, who continued it under that business name. Around 2000, Noë in turn passed it on to his younger son, Sasha.

The establishment operated as a speakeasy during Prohibition, which lasted from 1920 to 1933.

It did not become a tavern until 1863, but through its grocery roots is considered New York City's second-oldest food-and-drink establishment in the same locale, predated only by the Bridge Cafe (1794). In that respect, according to historian Richard McDermot, the site's continuous operation since 1847 predates those of Pete's Tavern (1851) and McSorley's Old Ale House (1862).

== Artists' agora ==
Along with the restaurants Food, Cafe Rienzi, the O.G. Dining Room and the Spring Street Bar, Fanelli Cafe was among the gathering places for the artist community that settled in Manhattan's SoHo neighborhood from the Beat Generation era to the 1980s, between the neighborhood's times as a manufacturing center and an upscale shopping district. "Whatever work went on in the local studios was fueled by conversations that took place, and partnerships that formed, around these communal tables during the day and in neighborhood kitchens, bars and bedrooms after dark."

Artist Chuck Close was a habitué, as were boxing champion Rocky Graziano and singer-songwriter Bob Dylan. Close biographer Christopher Finch wrote:

In the late 1960s, Fanelli's daytime patrons were a comfortable mix of artists and the local blue-collar workers who had sustained the place prior to the artists' arrival. ... Until the Spring Street Bar opened in the early seventies, Fanelli's was the only saloon in SoHo proper that stayed open past about 6 p.m., and in the early evening after the blue-collar crowd headed for home, the cafe turned into an artists' bar. Since it was almost next door to Paula Cooper's gallery, it was also a place to hang out before and after readings or performances, though this was subject to [owner] Mike's unpredictable whims regarding closing time.
