= Hans Noë =

American architect and sculptor (1928–2025)

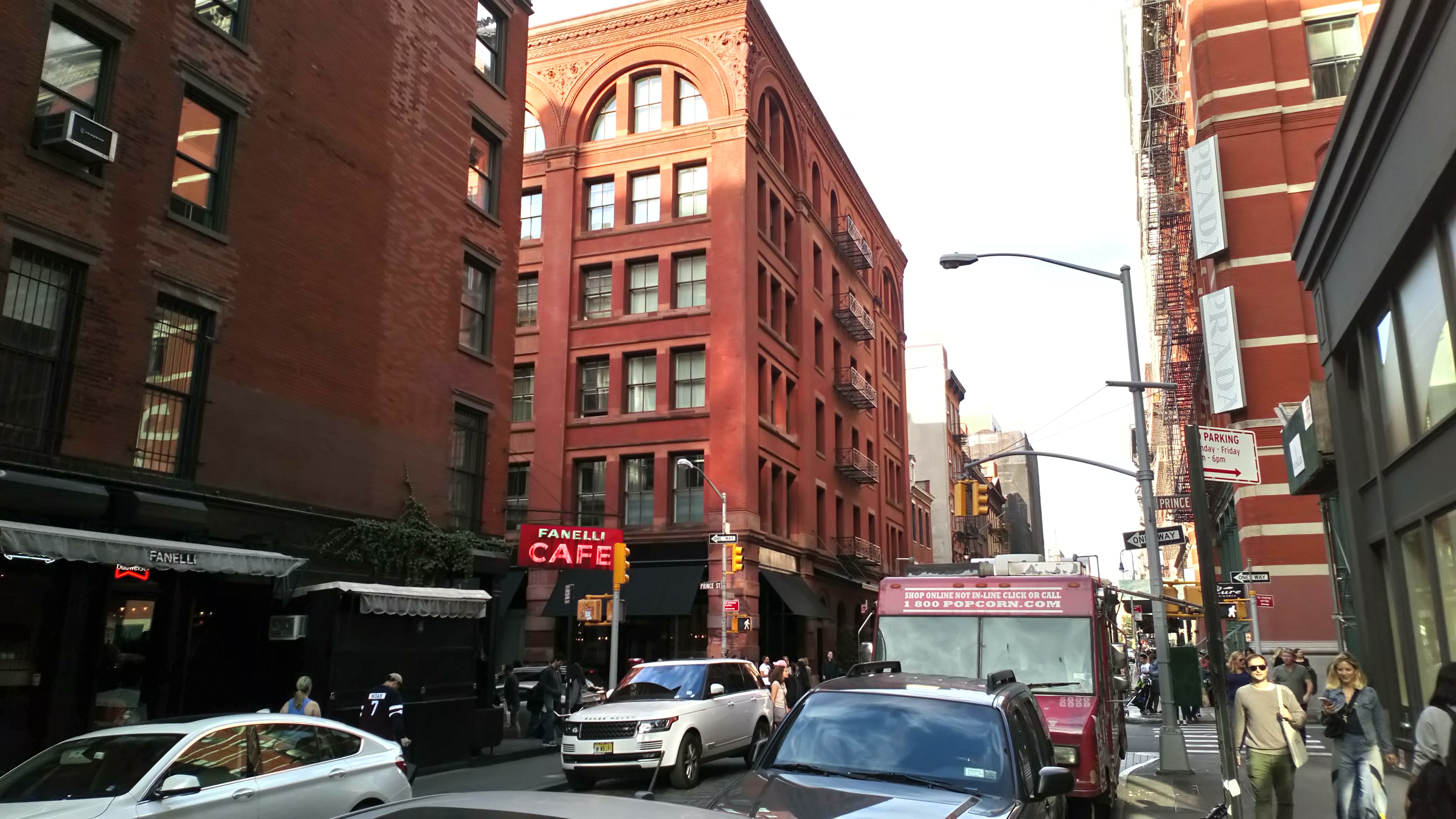
Fanelli Cafe

Hans Noë (June 18, 1928 – May 11, 2025) was an American architect, sculptor and proprietor of the Fanelli Cafe in New York City.

== Life and career ==
Noë was born in Cernăuți (German: Czernowitz) in the Kingdom of Romania, a city then populated by a large number of German-speaking Jews, and now called Chernivtsi and located in Ukraine. Noë's Jewish family was imprisoned in the city's ghetto and in a ghetto in Bucharest during World War II.

After the war, they spent time in German refugee camps. Noë studied at the institution now known as the Hochschule für Gestaltung Offenbach am Main. His family arrived in New York in 1949.

Noë continued his studies at the Cooper Union and served in the U.S. Army after being drafted. After his military service, he studied at the Illinois Institute of Technology. As an architect, he became a student and protégé of Mies van der Rohe, who was teaching there.

Noë's sculpture was the subject of a retrospective at the National Museum of Mathematics in 2023.

Noë died in Garrison, New York on May 11, 2025, at the age of 96. His son Alva Noë is a philosopher.
