= McSorley's Old Ale House =

Tavern in New York City

Coordinates: 40.72871°N 73.98974°W

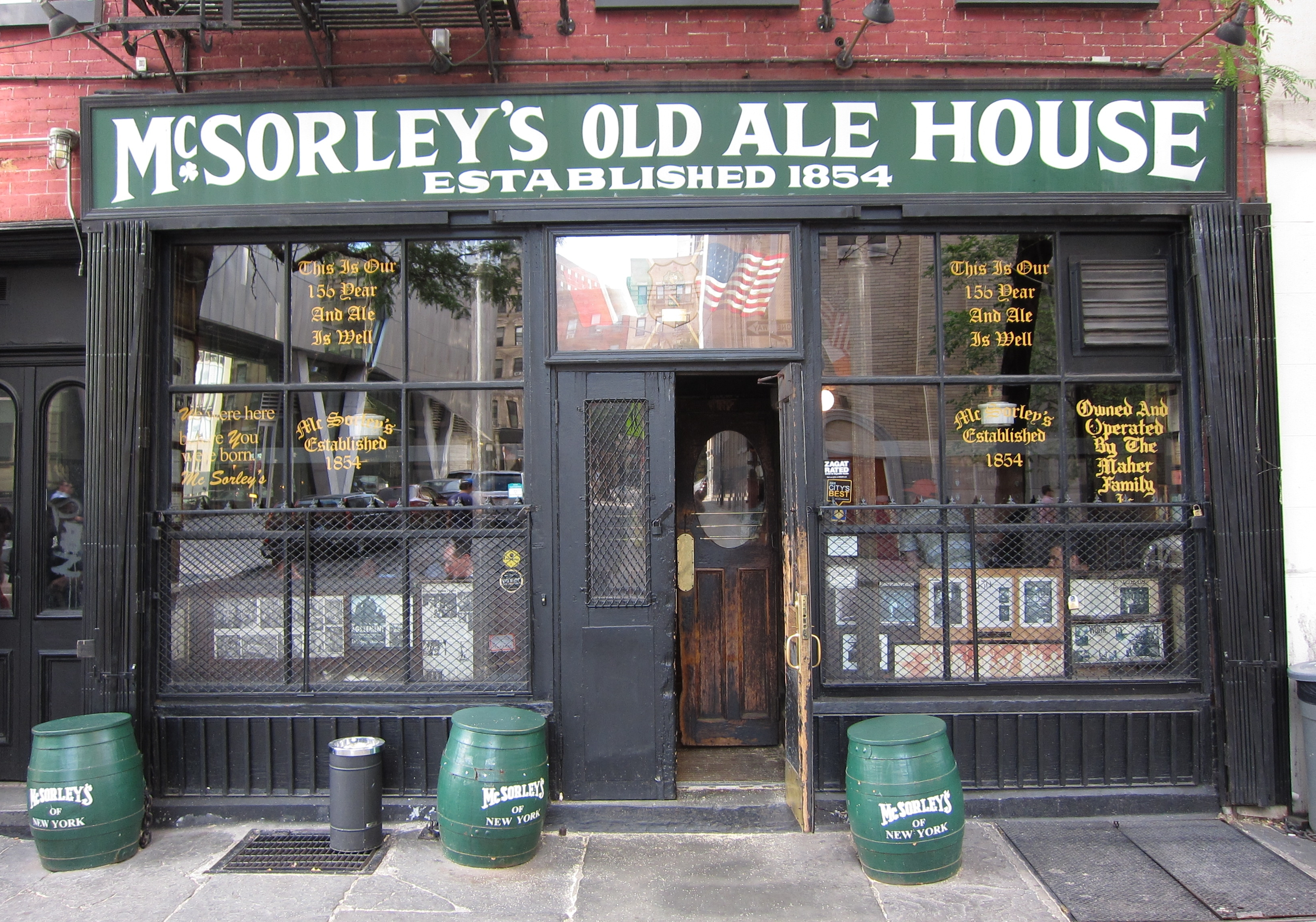
- The front of McSorley's
- Interactive map of McSorley's Old Ale House

Restaurant information
- Location: 15 East 7th Street, New York City, New York, United States
- Website: mcsorleysoldalehouse.nyc

McSorley's Old Ale House is the oldest Irish saloon in New York City. Opened in the mid-19th century at 15 East 7th Street, in what is now the East Village neighborhood of Manhattan, it was one of the last of the "Men Only" pubs, admitting women only after legally being forced to do so in 1970. (Note: "The place had long been a men-only establishment until 1970, when Ms. Shaum became the first female patron admitted under a new city ordinance banning discrimination against women in public places ...") The aged artwork, newspaper articles covering the walls, sawdust floors, and the Irish waiters and bartenders give McSorley's an atmosphere reminiscent of "Olde New York". No piece of memorabilia has been removed from the walls since 1910, and there are many items of historical paraphernalia in the bar, such as a pair of Houdini's handcuffs, which are connected to the bar rail. There are also wishbones hanging above the bar; supposedly they were hung there by boys going off to World War I, to be removed when they returned, so the wishbones that are left are from those who never returned. (Note: "Joseph Mitchell, the inimitable chronicler of old New York, once wrote that the founder, John McSorley, simply liked to save things, including the wishbones of holiday turkeys. But Mr. Maher, who has worked at McSorley’s since 1964 — he predates some of the memorabilia — insists that the bones were hung by doughboys as wishful symbols of a safe return from the Great War. The bones left dangling came to represent those who never came back.")

Two of McSorley's mottos are "Be Good or Be Gone", and "We were here before you were born". Before the 1970 ruling, the motto was "Good Ale, Raw Onions and No Ladies"; the raw onions can still be ordered as part of McSorley's cheese platter.

McSorley's is one of the longest continuously operating ale houses in the city as during Prohibition it served a "near beer" with too little alcohol to be illegal. In 2005, New York magazine named it one of the city's "Top 5 Historic Bars".

== History ==
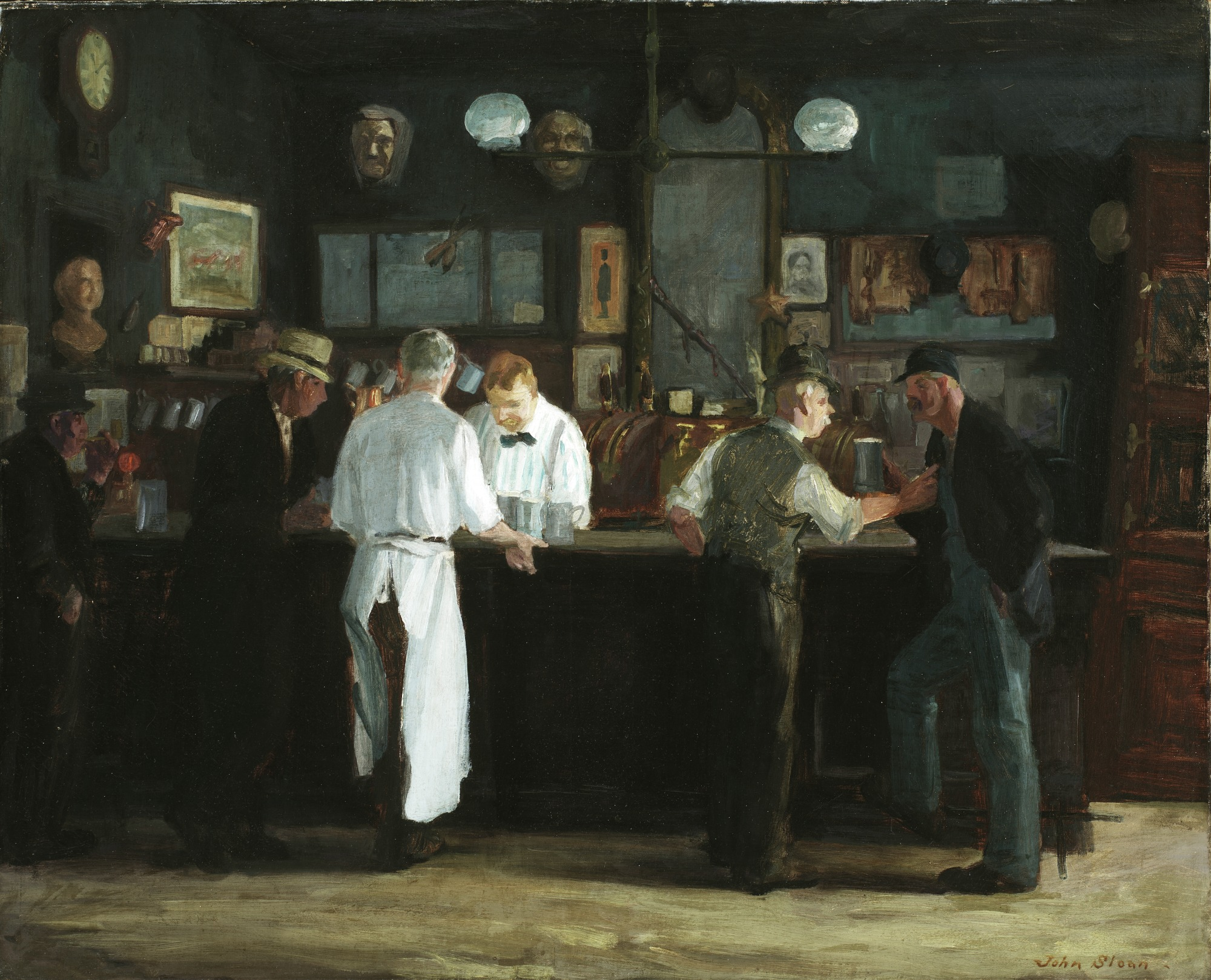
McSorley's Bar, a 1912 painting by John French Sloan

=== Founding and later proprietors ===
When it opened, the saloon was originally called "The Old House at Home". McSorley's has long claimed that it opened its doors in 1854; however, historical research has shown that the site was a vacant lot from 1860 to 1861.

The evidence for the 1854 date was considerable, but second-hand. A document at the Museum of the City of New York from 1904, in founder John McSorley's hand, declares it was established in 1854, and a New York Tribune article from 1895 states it "has stood for 40 years. . . " a short distance from Cooper Union. A 1913 article in Harper's Weekly declares that "This famous saloon ... is sixty years old."

According to a 1995 New York Times "Streetscapes" article by Christopher Gray, the census taker who visited the Irish-born McSorley in 1880 recorded the year the founder of the pub first arrived in the United States as 1855, but immigration records show that he arrived on January 23, 1851, at the age of 18, accompanied by Mary McSorley, who was 16. When confronted with the fact that the 1880 census did not contain this entry, Gray corrected it to 1900 in his book published in 2003. John McSorley first appeared in city directories in 1862, and the building his bar occupies was built no earlier than 1858, according to city records.

McSorley's is included within the East Village/Lower East Side Historic District, created by the New York City Landmarks Preservation Commission in 2012. In the district's designation report, the building's date of construction is given as "c.1865", but it notes that indirect evidence may indicate that there was a small structure on the lot before that, since the value of the lot increased between 1848 and 1856, while that of surrounding lots did not, which may be explained by the existence of an unrecorded structure. By 1861 there was a two-story building on the lot, according to tax records, and by 1865 the present five-story one, but it is "unclear" if the former was extended upwards or a new building was constructed.

Founding owner John McSorley passed daily management to his son, William, around 1890, and died in 1910 at the age of 87. In 1936 William sold the property to Daniel O’Connell, a retired policeman and longtime customer. After O'Connell's death three years later, his daughter Dorothy O’Connell Kirwan assumed ownership. Upon her death in 1974 and that of her husband the following year, ownership passed briefly to their son Danny before the most recent proprietor, Matthew "Matty" Maher, who purchased the bar in 1977 and owned it until his death in January 2020. Maher's daughter Ann Pullman plans to keep it in the family.

A 1954 New York City tourist guide describes McSorley's as, "An unusual and historic old tavern, little changed since established before Civil War. Interesting old dining room, seats 150 (men only at any time, though owned by a woman); different house specialty every day; old-time songs; bar room quartet variety nightly; famous, well stocked bar. Inexpensive."

=== Opened to women ===
Women were not allowed in McSorley's until August 10, 1970, after National Organization for Women attorneys Faith Seidenberg and Karen DeCrow filed a discrimination case against the bar in District Court and won. The two entered McSorley's in 1969, and were refused service, which was the basis for their lawsuit for discrimination. The case decision made the front page of The New York Times on June 26, 1970. The suit, Seidenberg v. McSorleys' Old Ale House (S.D.N.Y. 1970) established that the licensing of the bar, under the New York State Alcoholic Beverage Control Law, rose to the level of state action, thereby requiring the bar to comply with the proscriptions of the Equal Protection Clause of the United States Constitution. The bar was then forced to admit women, but it did so "kicking and screaming". In 1970 Barbara Shaum became the bar's first female patron. With the ruling requiring women to be served, the bathroom became unisex. Sixteen years later, in 1986, a ladies' room was installed.

=== 2016 closure and reopening ===
McSorley's maintained a mouser cat within its premises until a law was passed ending the practice in 2011. In November 2016, the establishment was briefly closed by the New York City Department of Health and Mental Hygiene due to violations of health code. It reopened the next week.

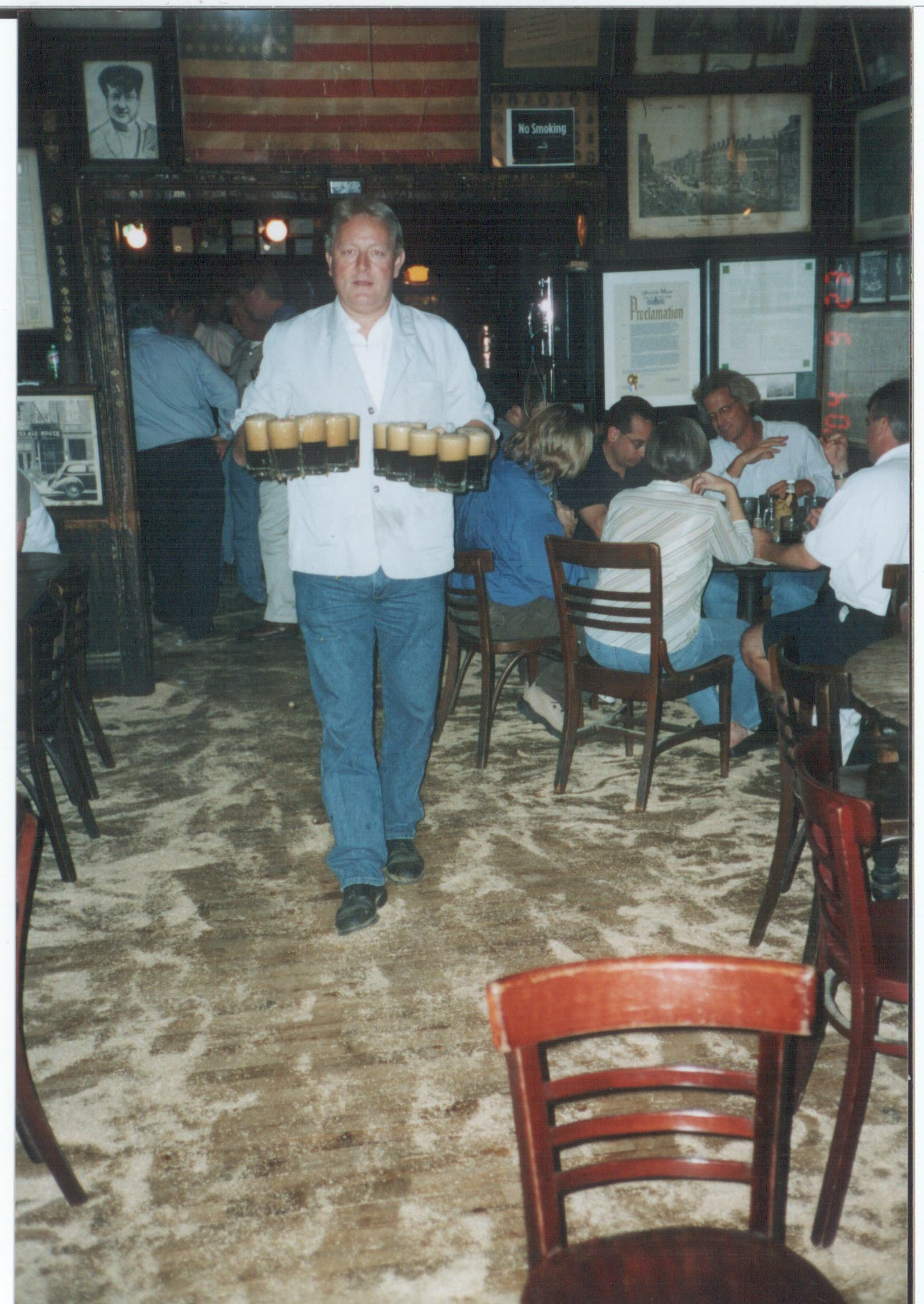
The interior of the bar

In January 2020, the then owner Matty Maher died.

== Notable patrons ==
Notable people who have visited McSorley's include Abraham Lincoln, Ulysses S. Grant, Teddy Roosevelt, Boss Tweed, Harry Houdini, Jackie Gleason (who reportedly wrote "where are all the dames" in the bar's logbook), and John Lennon. Cultural icons such as Woody Guthrie, Hunter S. Thompson, Brendan Behan, Paul Blackburn, LeRoi Jones, Christopher Morley, Gilbert Sorrentino, and George Jean Nathan, frequented the tavern. Folk singer/guitarist Dave Van Ronk used photos of himself outside the doors for album covers, and Wavy Gravy read poetry there. Dustin Hoffman was a patron. In the early 1910s, anarchist Hippolyte Havel became a regular.

In his 1923 poem "i was sitting in mcsorley's", poet E. E. Cummings described McSorley's as "the ale which never lets you grow old". He also described the bar as "snug and evil". McSorley's was the focus of several articles by New Yorker author Joseph Mitchell. One collection of his stories was entitled McSorley's Wonderful Saloon (1943). According to Mitchell, the Ashcan school painters John Sloan, George Luks and Stuart Davis were all regulars. Between 1912 and 1930, Sloan did five paintings, of the saloon — “McSorley’s Bar,” “McSorley’s Back Room,” “McSorley’s at Home,” “McSorley’s Cats,” and “McSorley’s, Saturday Night.” The first of which hangs in The Detroit Institute of Arts. The bar has also been painted by Harry McCormick, and photographed by Berenice Abbott.

McSorley's most notable regular, however, was Cooper Union founder Peter Cooper who would regularly hold court in the back room. John McSorley instructed that his favorite chair be draped with a black cloth every April 4 following Cooper's 1883 death.

After the New York Rangers hockey team won the Stanley Cup in 1994, they took the cup to McSorley's and drank out of it; the resulting dent caused the NHL to take the trophy back for several days for repairs.

== Other locations ==
McSorley's Old Ale House has no other locations; however, a company called Eclipse Management has opened four McSorley's Ale Houses in Hong Kong and Macau "based loosely on the appearance of the original McSorley's Ale House in Lower Manhattan, NYC". These bars sell McSorley's Ale, but are not associated in any way with McSorley's.

== In popular culture ==
- In the comic book Preacher, the character Cassidy recounts having spent a number of years frequenting McSorley's.
- McSorley's is used as a filming location in the 1991 film The Hard Way.
- McSorley's was used as a filming location in the 1998 film Rounders, starring Matt Damon and Edward Norton.
- In Sergio Leone's 1984 film Once Upon A Time in America, the bar in which the five young gang members debate whether to take the dollar the bartender offers them to burn the newsstand or roll the drunk, was filmed inside McSorley's. A different bar was used for the exterior shots.
- In the television series The Golden Girls, Sophia Petrillo, played by Estelle Getty, claims that her daughter Dorothy was born on a pinochle table at McSorley's, an anachronism, as McSorley's did not admit women until 1970.
- Daniel O'Connell Kirwan, the manager of McSorley's and son of the owner, appeared on the August 27, 1970, broadcast of episode 0514 of the panel game show To Tell the Truth after New York City required women to be admitted to the bar.
- In seasons 42 and 43 of Saturday Night Live, Mikey Day’s portion of the intro was shot here.
- McSorley's is featured in Christian Nilsson's Emmy Award-winning short documentary Fight To Be The Oldest Bar In NYC produced by HuffPost in 2015.
- Season 2 of The Marvelous Mrs. Maisel filmed part of the episode "Look, She Made a Hat" in McSorley's, where it is used to depict Cedar Tavern - also a real bar in New York.
- Episode 7 of the Netflix series Dash & Lily takes place in McSorley's.
- Famous American painter, Clyde Singer, depicted a young couple at the bar in his 1973 piece, titled, "McSorley's- Two By The Stove"
- New Yorker Magazine writer Joseph Mitchell wrote McSorley's Wonderful Saloon in 1943. It was also included in a collection of Mitchell's works, Up In the Old Hotel, published in 1992 by Vintage Classics.

== See also ==
- List of Irish restaurants
- List of restaurants in New York City
- Farrell's Bar & Grill
