= Prospect Avenue (Brooklyn) =

Avenue in Brooklyn, New York

- Building on Prospect Avenue and Greenwood Avenue
- Interactive map of Prospect Avenue
- Owner: City of New York
- Maintained by: NYCDOT
- Length: 1.6 mi (2.6 km)2.5
- Location: Brooklyn
- Coordinates: 40.66080350241259°N 73.98499397613367°W
- North end: Third Avenue and Hamilton Avenue in Gowanus
- South end: Ocean Parkway in Windsor Terrace

Prospect Avenue is a major street in Brooklyn, New York.

== Route description ==
Prospect Avenue generally runs northwest-southeast, from Hamilton and Third Avenues in Gowanus and Park Slope; southeast of Eleventh Avenue it turns nearly due south and runs through Windsor Terrace, terminating at Ocean Parkway. In this southern section, Prospect Avenue occupies the position of East 6th Street in the Brooklyn street grid, with East 5th Street to its west and East 7th Street to its east.

Prospect Avenue intersects every numbered avenue from Third to Eleventh. Due to steep slopes, Seeley Street crosses Prospect Avenue on a masonry bridge. Originally two-way throughout its length, Prospect Avenue is now one-way northbound in two sections as a result of the construction of the Prospect Expressway through the area. It runs one way for one block between Ocean Parkway and Greenwood Avenue, with an on ramp leading to the Prospect Expressway westbound. Between Sixth and Third Avenues, it is one-way for the remainder of its length. Exit 2 from the westbound Prospect Expressway merges into Prospect Avenue between Fifth and Fourth Avenues.

== History ==
Prospect Avenue was originally known as Middle Street, and was laid out on the Commissioners Plan of 1839. As originally designed, Middle Street's southern terminus was at the (then) city limits, approximately the present intersection of Terrace Place. Middle Street, along with Sherman Street and Braxton Street (now Windsor Place), filled the gap between 16th Street and 17th Street caused by an angle in the Brooklyn street grid.

An attempt was made in 1865 to change the name of Middle Street to Sterling Street, possibly for Lord Stirling, but was vetoed by Mayor Alfred M. Wood.

With the establishment of Prospect Park came the necessity for additional access, and in 1868 the New York Legislature passed an act which provided for the improvement of Middle Street, and its renaming to Prospect Avenue. It was to be widened from 60 to 80 feet.

Maps made in 1874 for the Kings County Town Survey Commission provided for the extension of Prospect Avenue at a 100-foot width into the Town of Flatbush as far as Ocean Parkway. A steep. boulder - strewn terminal moraine, and the fact that the Brooklyn and Flatbush sections of Prospect Avenue were misaligned at the boundary between the two municipalities, delayed completion of the thoroughfare for many years. In 1903, plans were approved to correct the misalignment at the former boundary, to cut through the hill and connect the sections of Prospect Avenue as a continuous roadway. Seeley Street was to cross over Prospect Avenue on a concrete and steel arch bridge.

== Public transportation ==
Prospect Avenue is served by the New York City Subway's BMT Fourth Avenue Line station at Prospect Avenue and the IND Culver Line station at Fort Hamilton Parkway. The Downtown Brooklyn-bound B103 takes the Prospect Avenue exit on the Prospect Expressway, then heads north on Fourth Avenue.
