= Fanelli =

Fanelli is a surname. Notable people with the surname include:

- Alison Fanelli (born 1979), American former actress
- Emanuela Fanelli (born 1986), Italian actress
- Ernest Fanelli (1860–1917), French composer
- Francesco Fanelli (c. 1590–1653), Italian sculptor
- Gary Fanelli (born 1950), American Samoa long-distance runner
- Giuseppe Fanelli (1827–1877), Italian revolutionary anarchist
- Pier Simone Fanelli (1641–1703), Italian painter
- Sara Fanelli (born 1969), native-Italian British artist and illustrator
- Vincent Fanelli (1881–1966), American artist

== See also ==
- Fanelli Cafe, historic New York City restaurant and bar
- The Fanelli Boys, TV sitcom in the USA
