= Farrell's Bar & Grill =

Tavern in New York City

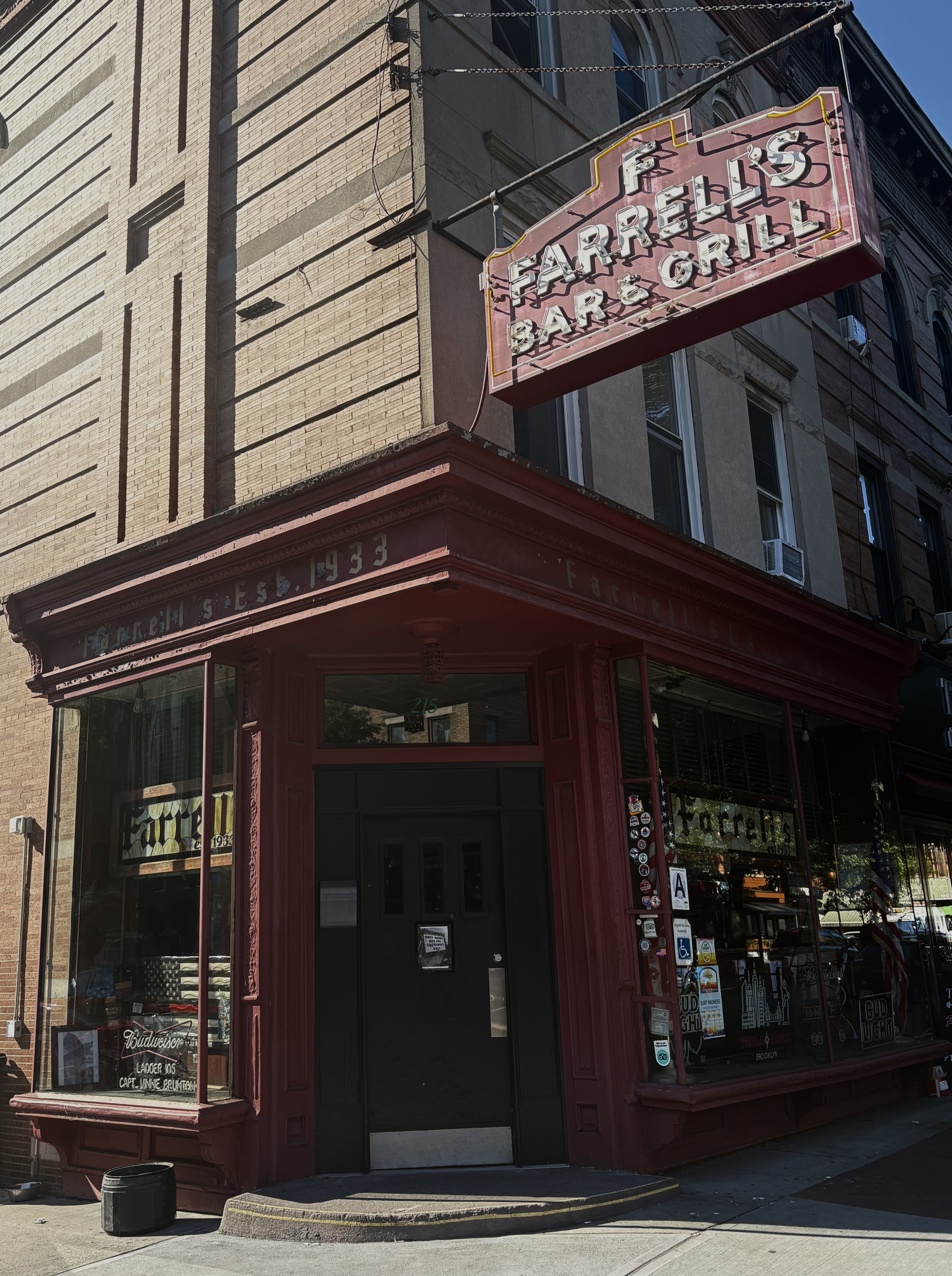
- Interactive map of Farrell's Bar & Grill

Restaurant information
- Established: 1933
- Location: 215 Prospect Park West, Brooklyn, New York, 11215, United States
- Coordinates: 40°39′37″N 73°58′49″W

Farrell's Bar & Grill, often referred to as Farrell's, is a tavern in the Windsor Terrace neighborhood of Brooklyn, New York, United States. Opened in 1933, the bar is frequently cited as one of Brooklyn's oldest continuously operating watering holes and a landmark of Irish-American community life near the southwest corner of Prospect Park. It is known for serving very cold beer in large 32-US-fluid-ounce (950 ml) "containers"—a house tradition that continued with paper or plastic cups after New York's styrofoam ban—and for its spare, old-school interior.

== History ==
The bar opened in 1933, the year Prohibition ended; contemporary coverage and later retrospectives credit Eddie Farrell with establishing the business, which became a hub for the largely Irish working-class neighborhood. Through the mid-to-late 20th century, Farrell's developed a reputation for no-frills service, a long wooden bar beneath pressed-tin ceilings, and a regular clientele that included firefighters, police officers, and local writers.

Ownership later passed to partners that included longtime bartender Jimmy "Hooley" Houlihan, who worked at the bar for decades and was widely profiled for community philanthropy; he retired in 2019 and died in 2022, aged 83. Another co-owner, Danny Mills, who had tended the bar since the 1960s, became part-owner in 1996; he died in 2008.

For much of its early history, Farrell's did not serve women at the bar counter; women were seated in the rear and drinks were ordered on their behalf. Some sources attribute the first unaccompanied woman served at the bar to actress Shirley MacLaine. The bar's best-known custom is its 32-US-fluid-ounce (950 ml) take-home "containers" of beer; after New York City restricted foam, Farrell's replaced its iconic styrofoam cups with paper or plastic while maintaining the tradition. Farrell's serves only two beers on tap, Budweiser and Stella Artois; in the 1940s and 1950s, they only served Rupert Knickerbocker.

== Community role ==
Local reporting and features describe Farrell's as a community center and de facto town hall, known for memorials and fundraisers tied to nearby Holy Name Church and for honoring firefighters, including regular and occasional volunteer bartender Vinny Brunton, who died in the September 11 attacks. The bar has occasionally closed for funerals or memorials of prominent regulars and staff.

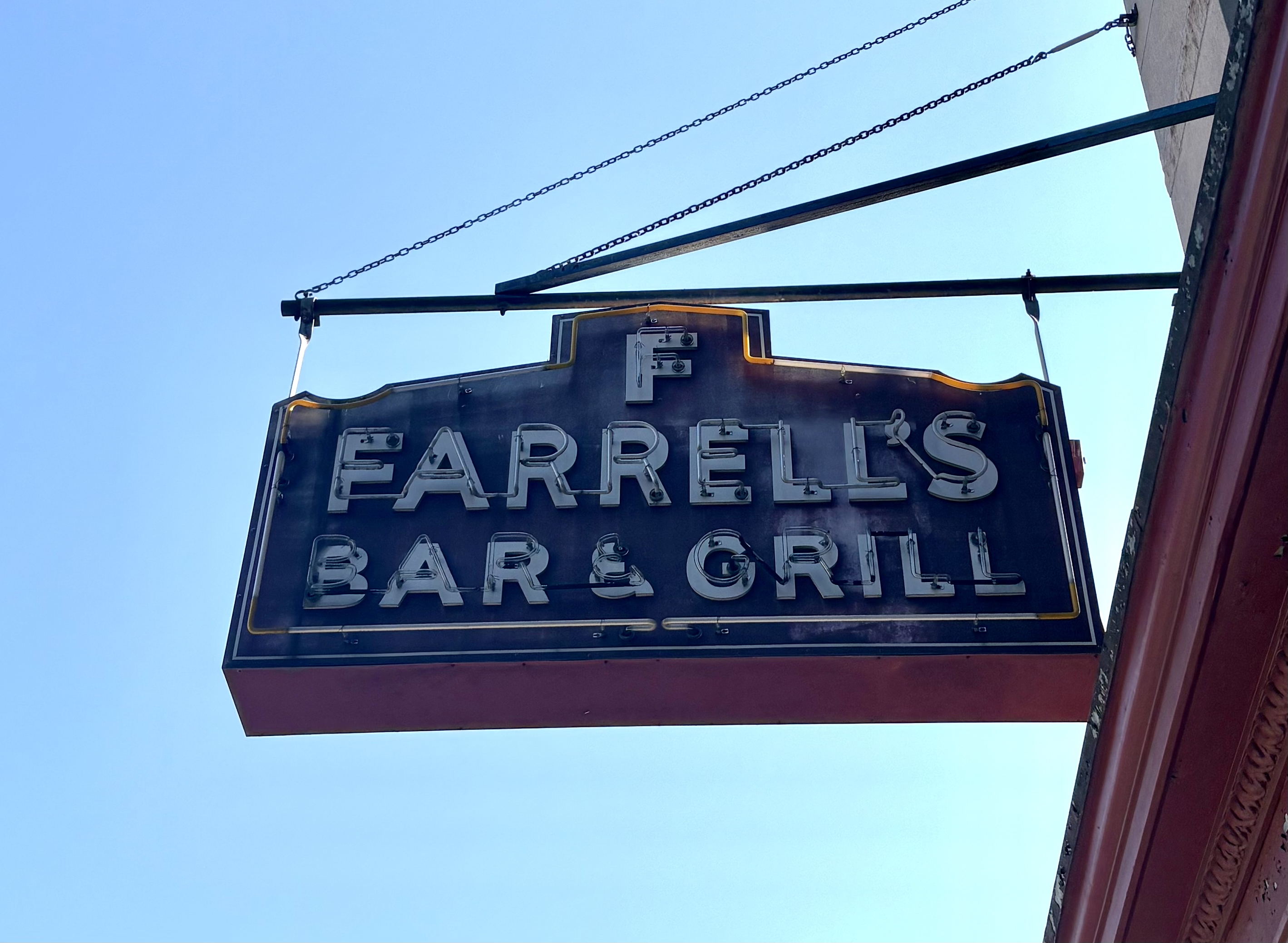
The sign outside of Farrell's, though the bar is not a "grill."

== In media ==
Beginning in 2019, Park Slope Films developed a feature documentary, Why Farrell's?, about the tavern's history and its place in a changing neighborhood, covered by television and local press. The bar is also regularly cited in guides to historic New York drinking establishments.

== Notable patrons ==
Notable visitors to the bar have included actor Harvey Keitel, actor Peter Weller, journalist Jimmy Breslin, Shirley MacLaine, journalist Pete Hamill, and Congressman Peter King; local coverage has also cited periodic visits by other actors and journalists.

== See also ==
- Irish Americans in New York City
- McSorley's Old Ale House – Tavern in New York City
