= Windsor Terrace, Brooklyn =

Neighborhood in New York City

Windsor Terrace
- Neighborhood of Brooklyn
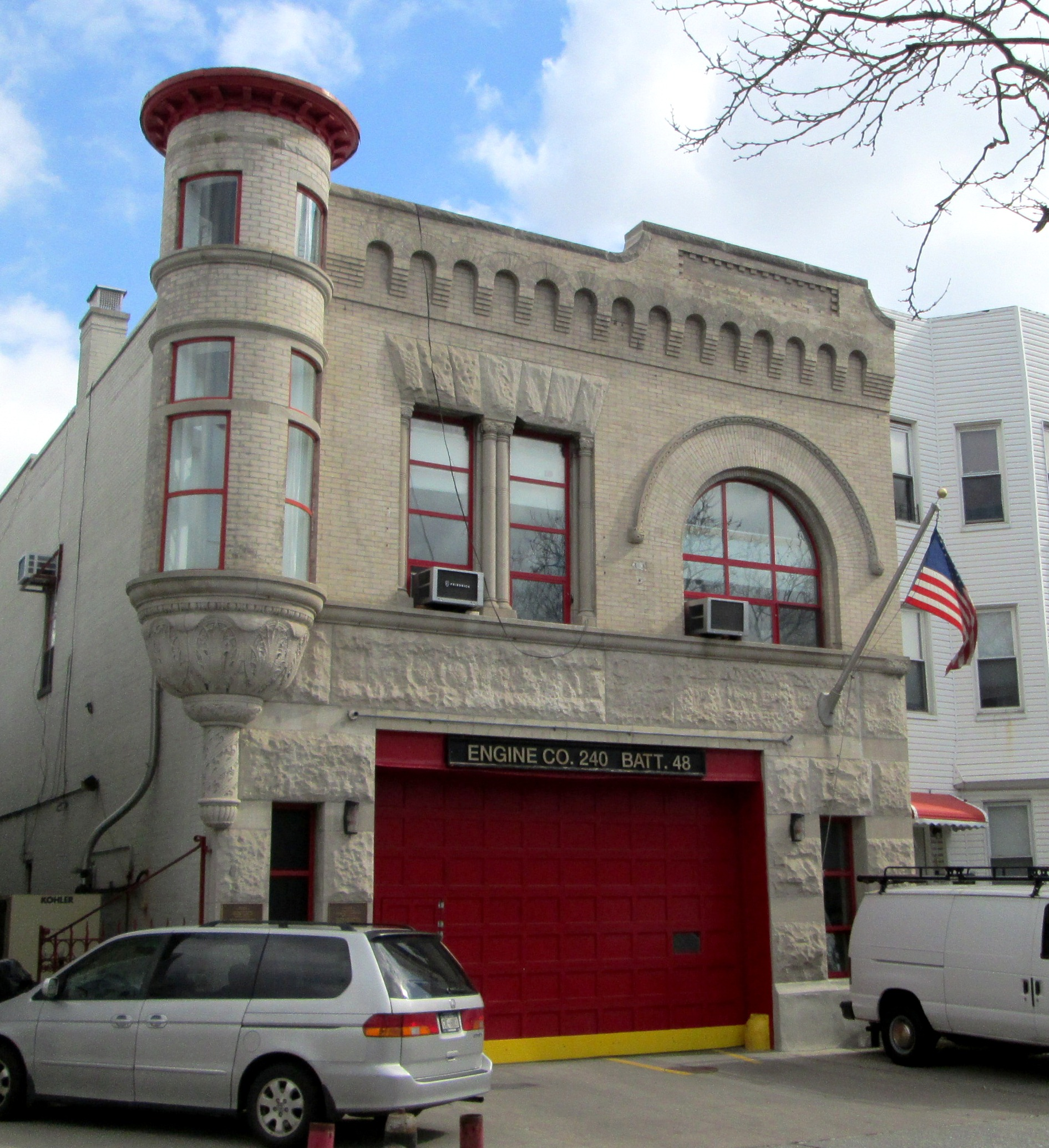
- The Engine Co. 240/Battalion 48 firehouse
- Location in New York City
- Coordinates: 40.655°N 73.979°W
- Country: United States
- State: New York
- City: New York City
- Borough: Brooklyn
- Community District: Brooklyn 7
- Subdivided: 1849
- Founder: William Bell
- Named for: a place in England named Windsor

Area
  - Total: 0.503 sq mi (1.30 km^{2})

Population (2010)
  - Total: 20,988
  - Density: 41,700/sq mi (16,100/km^{2})

Ethnicity
  - White: 64.9%
  - Hispanic: 15.7
  - Asian: 9.9
  - Black: 6.2%
  - Others: 3.3%

Economics
  - Median income: $97,474
- Time zone: UTC−5 (Eastern)
  - Summer (DST): UTC−4 (EDT)
- ZIP Codes: 11215, 11218
- Area code: 718, 347, 929, and 917

Windsor Terrace is a small residential neighborhood in the central part of the New York City borough of Brooklyn. It is bounded by Prospect Park on the east and northeast, Park Slope at Prospect Park West, Green-Wood Cemetery, and Borough Park at McDonald Avenue on the northwest, west, and southwest, and Kensington at Caton Avenue on the south. As of the 2010 United States census, Windsor Terrace had 20,988 people living within its 0.503-square-mile (1.30 km^{2}) area.

Windsor Terrace is part of Brooklyn Community District 7, and its primary ZIP Codes are 11215 and 11218. It is patrolled by the 72nd Precinct of the New York City Police Department. Fire services are provided by Engine Company 240/Battalion 48 of the New York City Fire Department. Politically, Windsor Terrace is represented by the New York City Council's 38th and 39th Districts.

== History ==
Before the coming of Europeans to the New World, the area which is now Windsor Terrace was inhabited by the Canarsee Indians. Specifically, the Gowanus and Werpos tribes inhabited the surrounding area. The land, which was then in the far northwestern corner of the Town of Flatbush, was purchased as a farm by John Vanderbilt. Some parts of the land were also maintained by the Martense family, who owned land in the area through 1895. This area was desirable due to its proximity to downtown Brooklyn, as well as the recent construction of the Coney Island Plank Road through the area and of the serene Green-Wood Cemetery to the southwest.

Following Vanderbilt's death, his land was divided in two. Vanderbilt's land were sold to William Bell, a real estate developer, in 1849. Bell subdivided the land into 47 building lots, and, unlike some other developers in the general area, was able to sell them rather quickly. Bell then renamed the area after one of the multiple places named Windsor in England. Bell sold part of the land to Edward Belknap in 1851, and Belknap subsequently built four streets on which he marked 49 lots for future "Pleasant Cottages." The development was incorporated as the Village of Windsor Terrace, which was bounded by Church Avenue on the south, McDonald Avenue on the west, the Brooklyn–Flatbush town line on the north, and Prospect Park Southwest and Coney Island Avenue on the east. The Brooklyn Daily Eagle first referred to the area as "Windsor Terrace" in March 1854. By 1856, Belknap had lost his land due to foreclosure.

The area was generally desirable due to its prime location in the far northwest of the Town of Flatbush; close to the City of Brooklyn, yet located far enough outside it that residents of Windsor Terrace were willing to move there for its suburban ambience; and within walking distance of the Coney Island and Brooklyn Railroad's horsecar line. Additional blocks were developed in 1862, when the village had 30 inhabitants living in twelve houses. The village kept growing through the 1870s, boasting a Protestant chapel by 1874, a public school by 1876, and its own volunteer fire department by 1888. The village remained rural in feel until around 1900, when row houses began to be built throughout the area, at first along Prospect Park SW.

Development began to pick up pace during the 1920s as rumors circulated that the neighborhood would soon be served by the New York City Subway. There were a lot of single-family and two-family houses being built, as well as stores being opened on 11th Avenue and two apartment buildings being erected on Prospect Avenue. Many of the new occupants of Windsor Terrace were Irish-Americans, many of whose families remain there to this day. The 1933 arrival of the Independent Subway System (IND) ushered in an era of apartment-building construction.

Even into the 1960s, Windsor Terrace was an isolated neighborhood with a quiet small-town feel to it, although the construction of the Prospect Expressway brought more through-traffic past the area. Gentrification of the neighborhood began in the 1980s, with families who could not afford the prices in Brooklyn Heights and Park Slope coming to Windsor Terrace instead, looking for more affordable real estate. During this time, the old square block-sized Pilgrim Laundry, site of an ancient Victorian-era brick edifice at the corner of Prospect Avenue and Terrace Place, was razed and replaced with 17 two-family houses constructed in 1983. The houses were funded with the cooperation of a public-private partnership and sold through lottery to locals. This brought attention to the need for affordable housing in Brooklyn, and in the late 1980s, the neighborhood was rezoned to prevent the construction of high-rise buildings in order to retain the small-town fabric of the existing neighborhood. However, by then, gentrification of the neighborhood had started, and would continue through the 2000s.

Residents protested after Key Food, the only major supermarket in the neighborhood, closed down in 2015. A new, smaller Key Food-owned store called Windsor Farms Market was opened and is currently operating in a portion of the old location. A food co-op called "Windsor Terrace Food Coop", using the model of the Park Slope Food Coop, was also organized at the same time. The co-op serves both as a supplier of food and a community focal point. To become a member, residents must pay a one-time fee and commit to a work requirement, although memberships from other Brooklyn food co-ops are honored. The food, especially produce, is often higher quality and lower in price than at local supermarkets.

== Location and street grid ==
=== Boundaries ===
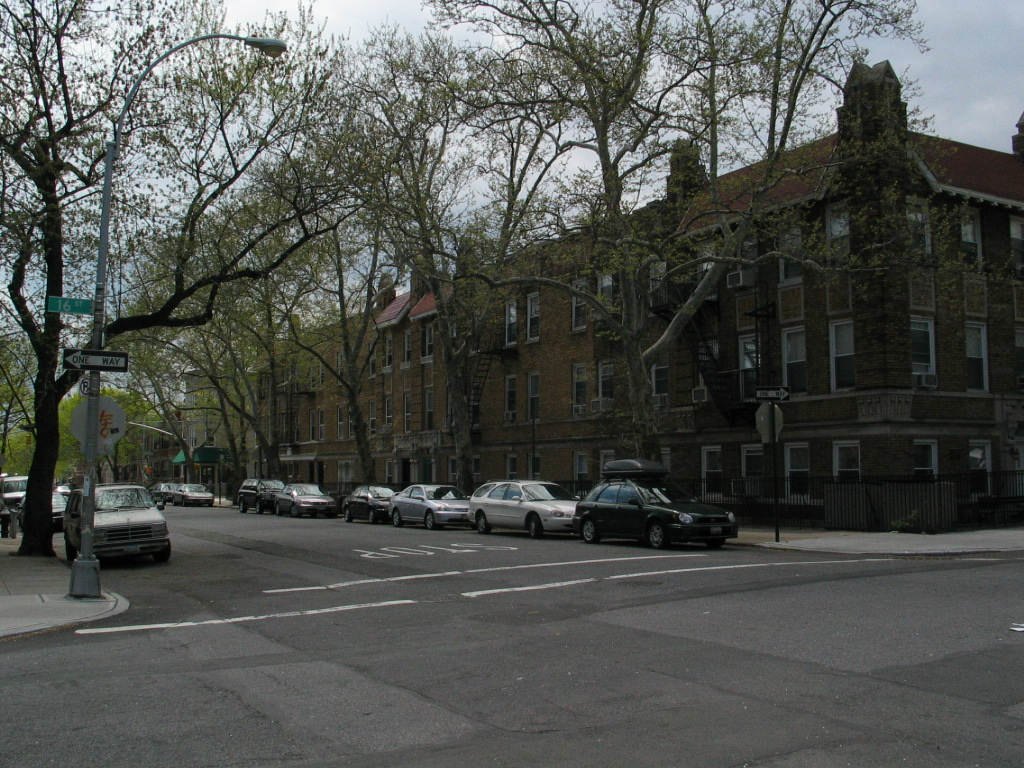
Typical residential street in Windsor Terrace

Windsor Terrace, which is part of Community Board 7, consists of a narrow, nine-block-wide area. Located in central Brooklyn, the neighborhood has a "curved, somewhat comma-like shape". The neighborhood lies between Green-Wood Cemetery to the southwest and Prospect Park to the northeast, split down the middle by the Prospect Expressway. Adjacent neighborhoods include Park Slope to the northeast and Kensington to the south. According to The Neighborhoods of Brooklyn, Windsor Terrace is bounded by Prospect Park West on the north, Prospect Park SW and Coney Island Avenue on the east, Caton Avenue on the south and McDonald Avenue on the west. However, the Encyclopedia of New York City gives the boundaries as Seventh Avenue and Prospect Park W on the north, Prospect Park SW to the east, and Green-Wood Cemetery to the south and west. Other sources extend the northwest corner to Eighth Avenue along 15th Street and 20th Street.

Windsor Terrace straddles the line between the original Dutch Colonial Brooklyn towns of Brooklyn and Flatbush, as can be seen from its street grid that is bent approximately northeast–southwest along present-day Terrace Place. Old South Brooklyn (which now finds itself more westerly in disposition within the expanded boundaries of modern, consolidated Brooklyn) is located to the north of Terrace Place in the direction of 11th Avenue, and the Town of Flatbush lay to the south, located in the direction of Seeley Street. The grid of old Brooklyn, which is tilted at an angle, is adjacent to the Flatbush grid, which is roughly aligned with the cardinal directions, at this juncture. The only other still-extant nuance of this ancient Dutch boundary is the legacy of original Catholic Parish boundaries, which are between Holy Name of Jesus to the north and Immaculate Heart of Mary to the south, and ZIP Codes applied much later (11215 to the north and 11218 to the south). In this area, Vanderbilt Street, named after John Vanderbilt, splits western Brooklyn's general street grid (comprising numbered avenues from 1st–101st Streets) and southeastern Brooklyn's general street grid (comprising lettered avenues from East 1st to East 108th Streets).

=== Streets ===
Street map

There are three streets between 16th and 17th Streets in the Windsor Terrace street grid, since the streets diverge from each other from Park Slope eastward. The northernmost of the streets is Windsor Place, which runs between 7th Avenue and Prospect Park Southwest. The southernmost of the streets is Prospect Avenue, which continues southward to Ocean Parkway (near the Fort Hamilton Parkway overpass across the Prospect Expressway) and northward to Third Avenue. Running between these two streets from 10th Avenue to Terrace Place, Sherman Street is named after Roger Sherman, a signatory of the Declaration of Colonial Rights, the United States Declaration of Independence, the Articles of Confederation, and the United States Constitution. The street name "Windsor Place" has been applied to two different streets throughout the neighborhood's history. The current Windsor Place was formerly Braxton Street before the 1900s, while 16th Street between Prospect Park W and Prospect Park SW was known as "Windsor Place" before then.

Prospect Park West takes the place of 9th Avenue in the Windsor Terrace grid, and continues with the "Prospect Park West" name south of Prospect Park's borders, continuing southeastward to Green-Wood Cemetery, where it ends in a cul-de-sac. The stretch of Prospect Park West between 16th Street and Green-Wood Cemetery has always been called the same name as the stretch adjoining Prospect Park; the entire street was formerly and officially named 9th Avenue.

Southeast of Prospect Park West, past Bartel-Pritchard Square, 15th Street becomes Prospect Park Southwest. The road bends noticeably between 11th Avenue and 16th Street; Prospect Park Southwest was previously known as Coney Island Avenue and originally known as the "Coney Island Plank Road" in the days of unpaved roads, when logs or "planks" were laid for stability and to keep the mud down. The southernmost stretch of Prospect Park Southwest, south of the bend at the termination of 16th Street, still retains Coney Island Avenue's street numbering system.

Prospect Avenue extends from Hamilton Avenue to Ocean Parkway and is crossed by a bridge at Seeley Street. The northern part was originally known as Middle Street and had its southernmost limit at what is now Terrace Place. An attempt was made in 1865 to change the name of Middle Street to Sterling Street, possibly for Lord Stirling, but was vetoed by Mayor Alfred M. Wood. Prospect Park's establishment required additional access, and in 1868 the New York Legislature passed an act that provided for Middle Street's renaming to Prospect Avenue and its widening from 60 to 80 feet (18 to 24 m). Maps made in 1874 for the Kings County Town Survey Commission provided for a 100-foot-wide (30 m) extension of Prospect Avenue into the Town of Flatbush; however, this was stymied by a steep, boulder-strewn terminal moraine, and the fact that the city of Brooklyn's and town of Flatbush's sections of the road were misaligned. In 1903, plans were approved to correct the misalignment; Prospect Avenue was extended through the cut, and Seely Street was placed over Prospect Avenue on a concrete-and-steel arch bridge.

==== Co-named streets ====
16th Street is co-named "Captain Vincent E. Brunton Way" after a New York City Fire Department captain who died in the September 11 attacks. 10th Avenue is also co-named "John P. Devaney Boulevard" in this area after a firefighter who died while trying to rescue residents of a burning Red Hook building in 1989.

==== Traffic circles ====
Traffic circles are relatively rare in New York City, but Windsor Terrace has three of them, all framing Prospect Park entrances along the park's border. The northernmost, a medium-sized traffic circle named Bartel-Pritchard Square, is at the intersection of Prospect Park West, Prospect Park Southwest, and 15th Street, and contains an ornate entrance framed with two columns. Another traffic circle was built at Prospect Park Southwest and 16th Street, although it no longer operates as a circle. The southernmost, a large traffic circle named Park Circle, is at the convergence of Prospect Park Southwest, Coney Island Avenue, Parkside Avenue, Ocean Parkway, and Fort Hamilton Parkway, and was reconstructed in 2010. Park Circle's entrance to Prospect Park is designed in a style similar to the Bartel-Pritchard Square entrance.

== Demographics ==
Based on data from the 2010 United States census, the population of Windsor Terrace was 20,988, an increase of 209 (1.0%) from the 20,779 counted in 2000. Covering an area of 322.38 acres (130.46 ha), the neighborhood had a population density of 65.1 inhabitants per acre (41,700/sq mi; 16,100/km^{2}).

The racial makeup of the neighborhood was 64.9% (13,616) White, 6.2% (1,298) African American, 0.1% (31) Native American, 9.9% (2,076) Asian, 0.0% (0) Pacific Islander, 0.7% (151) from other races, and 2.5% (531) from two or more races. Hispanic or Latino of any race were 15.7% (3,285) of the population.

== Culture ==
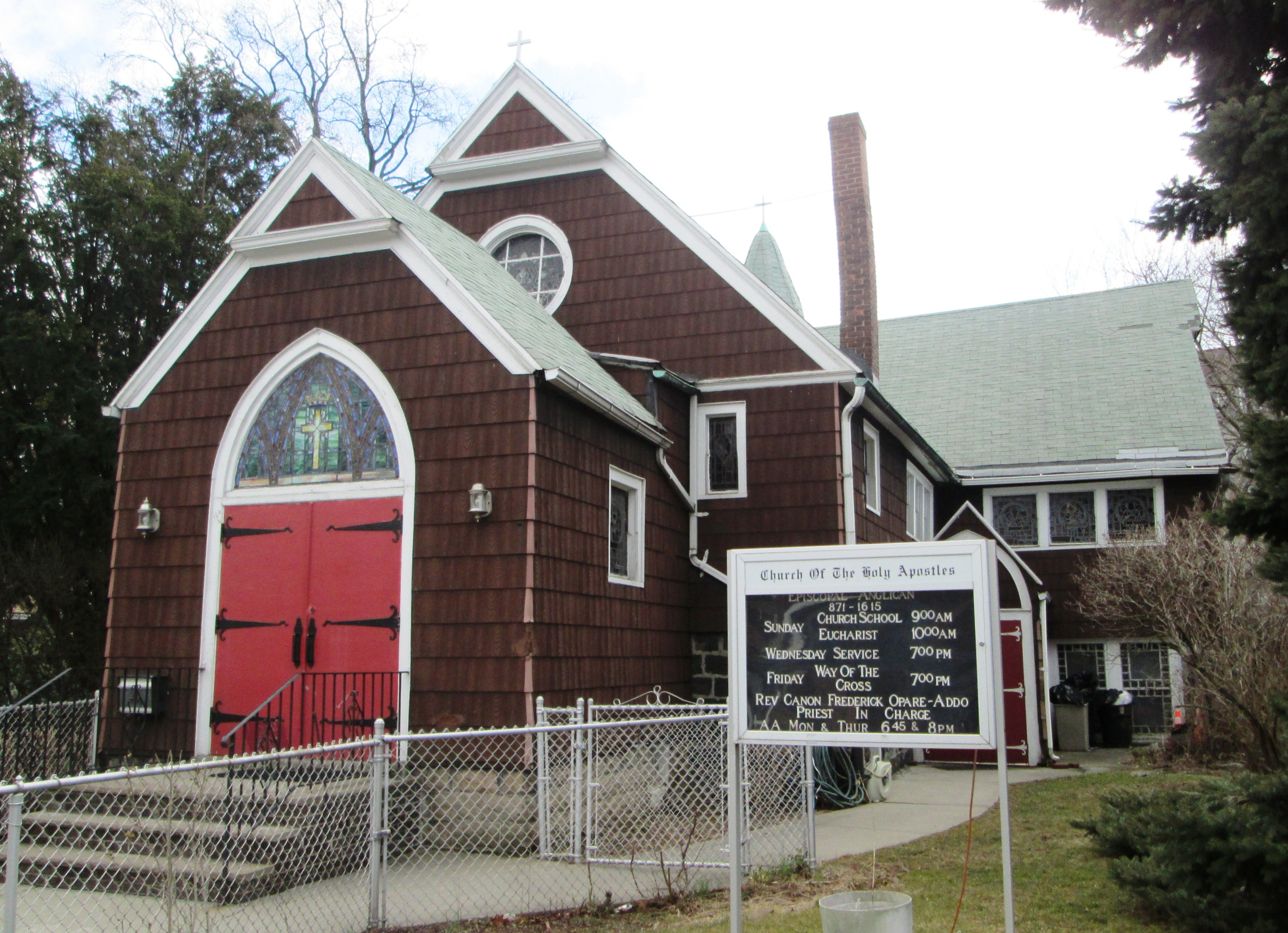
The Episcopal Church of the Holy Apostles on Greenwood Avenue

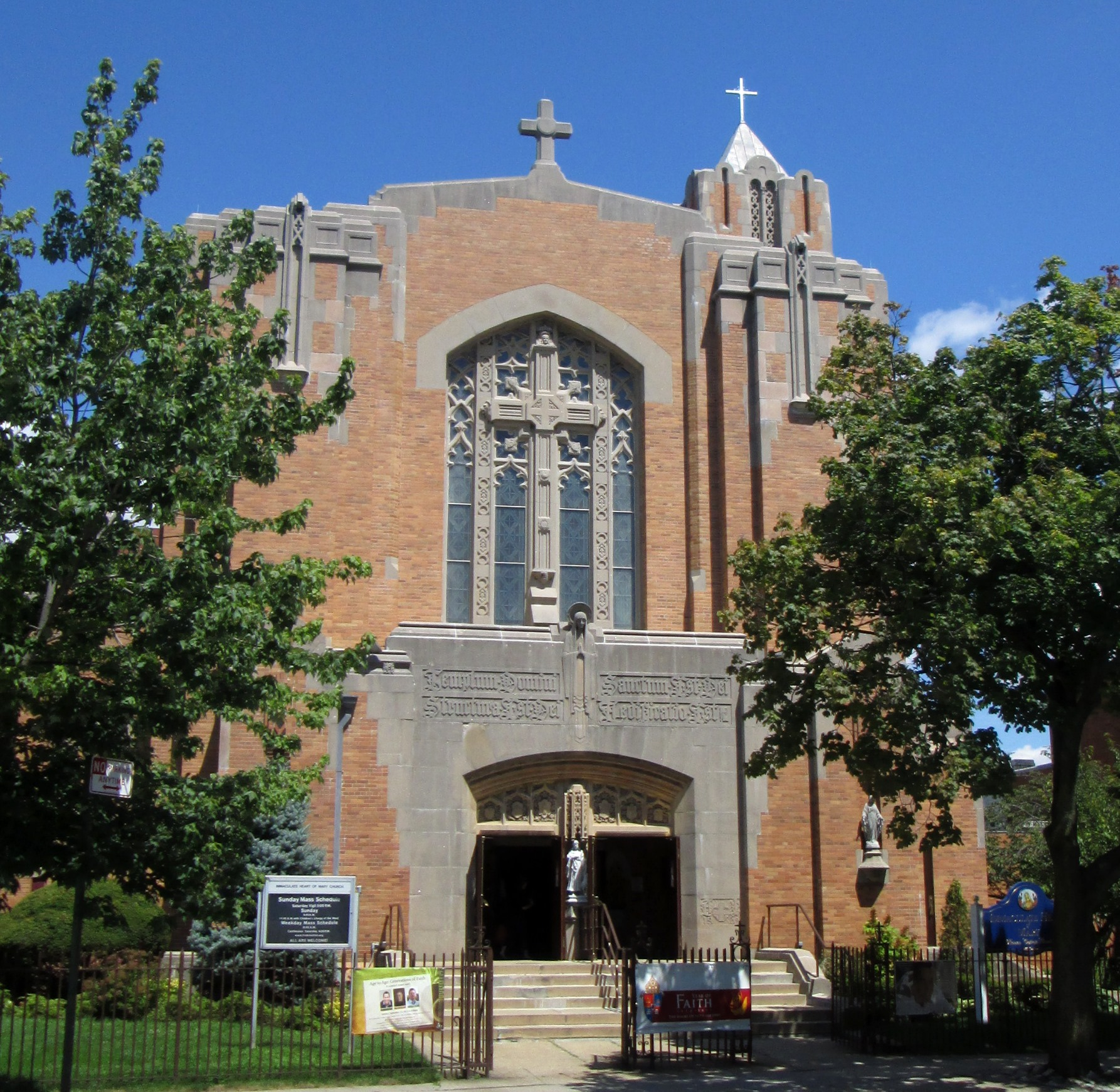
Immaculate Heart of Mary Church

Windsor Terrace is home to mainly Irish-, German-, Polish-, and Italian-American families, many having settled in its brick row and wood-frame houses when the neighborhood was first developed. The overwhelming majority of residents – many of whom can trace their family histories in Windsor Terrace back multiple generations – are Irish-American. They are traditionally affiliated with either Holy Name Church and School (the church having been built in 1874 and the school having been built in 1923, both located on present-day Prospect Park W), or Immaculate Heart of Mary (located on Fort Hamilton Parkway in Windsor Terrace's southeastern extremity). Other smaller Protestant denominations exist nearby, such as the Memorial Baptist Church at 16th Street and 8th Avenue, and Holy Apostles Episcopal on Greenwood Avenue. Over time, Windsor Terrace has become increasingly diverse, as Greek and Hispanic residents have moved in. There is also a minority of Syrians, Maronite Lebanese, and Jewish-Americans. The local synagogue is the Chabad Jewish Center. There is also a newer place of worship, the Calvary Cathedral of Praise at Caton Place and East Eighth Street.

By the 2000s and 2010s, an influx of residents seeking affordable family housing had pushed property prices up. In 2015, houses in various parts of Windsor Terrace sold for about $1.2 million to $2 million in 2015, and apartments cost from $400,000 for a one-bedroom apartment to more than $1 million for a three-bedroom apartment. Windsor Terrace is becoming more ethnically diverse and culturally active, owing to a demographic change since the 1990s, when the area had a more elderly population and not as many families with young children. The increased presence of many families with young kids has not indicated a significant cultural change in the neighborhood.

However, despite the increased population, the area still maintains a bit of small-town atmosphere, with relatively low house turnover. A real estate broker who grew up in the area said that in Windsor Terrace, "everybody says hello" to each other, and a real-estate feature in The New York Times stated that "residents look out for one another at all hours of the day." There is more on-street vehicle parking in Windsor Terrace than in nearby, more populous neighborhoods. The area's lack of traffic lights, due to low traffic volumes, make Windsor Terrace feel like a small town, as do well-maintained one-family houses, some with covered balconies and stained glass windows; other houses with "bay windows, both rounded and faceted"; and yet other "clapboard Italianate" houses with multicolored cornices. There are a few apartment buildings, including Windsor Tower, a 10-story building that was downgraded from 22 stories after community objections; a 73-unit, seven-floor rental building that opened in 2015; and a condominium tower at 279 Prospect Park W, a former paint factory storage building that posed as a bank in the 1975 movie Dog Day Afternoon. The houses are of varying types, including some small one-story clapboard houses that have attics and date to the neighborhood's development; larger two-story houses with basements and some wood framing on the exterior; and attached brick townhouses with either flat facades with normal-sized windows or curved facades with bay windows, both with two floors and a basement.

The neighborhood is mostly residential, with some commerce along Prospect Park W, Prospect Avenue, and Fort Hamilton Parkway. The latter two corridors have seen an increased commercial presence since the 2000s, but these new stores are mostly family-owned businesses, with the exception of a Walgreens and a grocery store in the area. There are at least four bars (The renown Farrell's Bar & Grill, the Double Windsor, and the Adirondack) as well as a combination cafe and food store called The Tuscan Gun; a combination pub and restaurant called Hamilton's; a French restaurant called Le Paddock; and a Middle Eastern restaurant called Batata. The commercial streets are also lined with new "coffee shops, yoga studios and vegetarian restaurants" that have popped up since the area's gentrification.

== Police and crime ==
Windsor Terrace is patrolled by the 72nd Precinct of the NYPD, located at 830 4th Avenue. The 72nd Precinct ranked 16th safest out of 69 patrol areas for per-capita crime in 2010. Total crime has decreased since the 1990s, and the 72nd Precinct is one of the safest precincts in Brooklyn as of 2010. The 72nd Precinct has a lower crime rate than in the 1990s, with crimes across all categories having decreased by 79.1% between 1990 and 2018. The precinct reported 2 murders, 32 rapes, 185 robberies, 209 felony assaults, 153 burglaries, 468 grand larcenies, and 77 grand larcenies auto in 2018.

== Fire safety ==
The New York City Fire Department (FDNY) operates the Engine Company 240/Battalion 48 fire station at 1307 Prospect Avenue. The company supersedes a volunteer fire department created in 1888. Brooklyn Fire Department Engine 40 was created with that number on January 20, 1896, moving into a firehouse at 1307-1309 Prospect Avenue (which is now a city landmark). The company was incorporated into the FDNY as Engine Company 240 on January 1, 1913.

The firehouse was built in 1896 in the Romanesque Revival style. It is constructed of brick, limestone, and slate. It was named a New York City designated landmark in February 2013. Its lookout tower hails from a time where fire alarm systems were nonexistent.

== Post office and ZIP Codes ==
Windsor Terrace is covered by ZIP Codes 11215 and 11218, which respectively cover the northern and southern parts of the neighborhood. The United States Post Office operates the Prospect Park West Station post office at 225 Prospect Park West.

== Political representation ==
Politically, Windsor Terrace is in New York's 10th congressional district. It is in the New York State Senate's 20th district, the New York State Assembly's 44th district, and the New York City Council's 38th and 39th districts. Windsor Terrace was once part of New York's 9th congressional district, but following redistricting in 2022, the neighborhood became part of the 10th congressional district.

Windsor Terrace is a heavily Democratic area; in the 2016 Presidential election, 84% of the 9th Congressional district (where Windsor Terrace had been located from 2013 until 2022) voted for Hillary Clinton, compared to 15% for rival Donald Trump. In the 2016 Democratic presidential primary, Hillary Clinton narrowly won the primary in Windsor Terrace, receiving 2,756 votes (51.8%) to Bernie Sanders's 2,568 votes (48.2%) with a total of 5,324 Democrats voting. Windsor Terrace had relatively few Republican primary voters. Just 371 voters cast ballots in the 2016 Republican primary, with 197 people (53.1% of the Republican electorate in the neighborhood) voting for Donald Trump, 120 for John Kasich (32.3% of the Republican electorate), and 54 for Ted Cruz (14.6% of the Republican electorate).

== Education ==
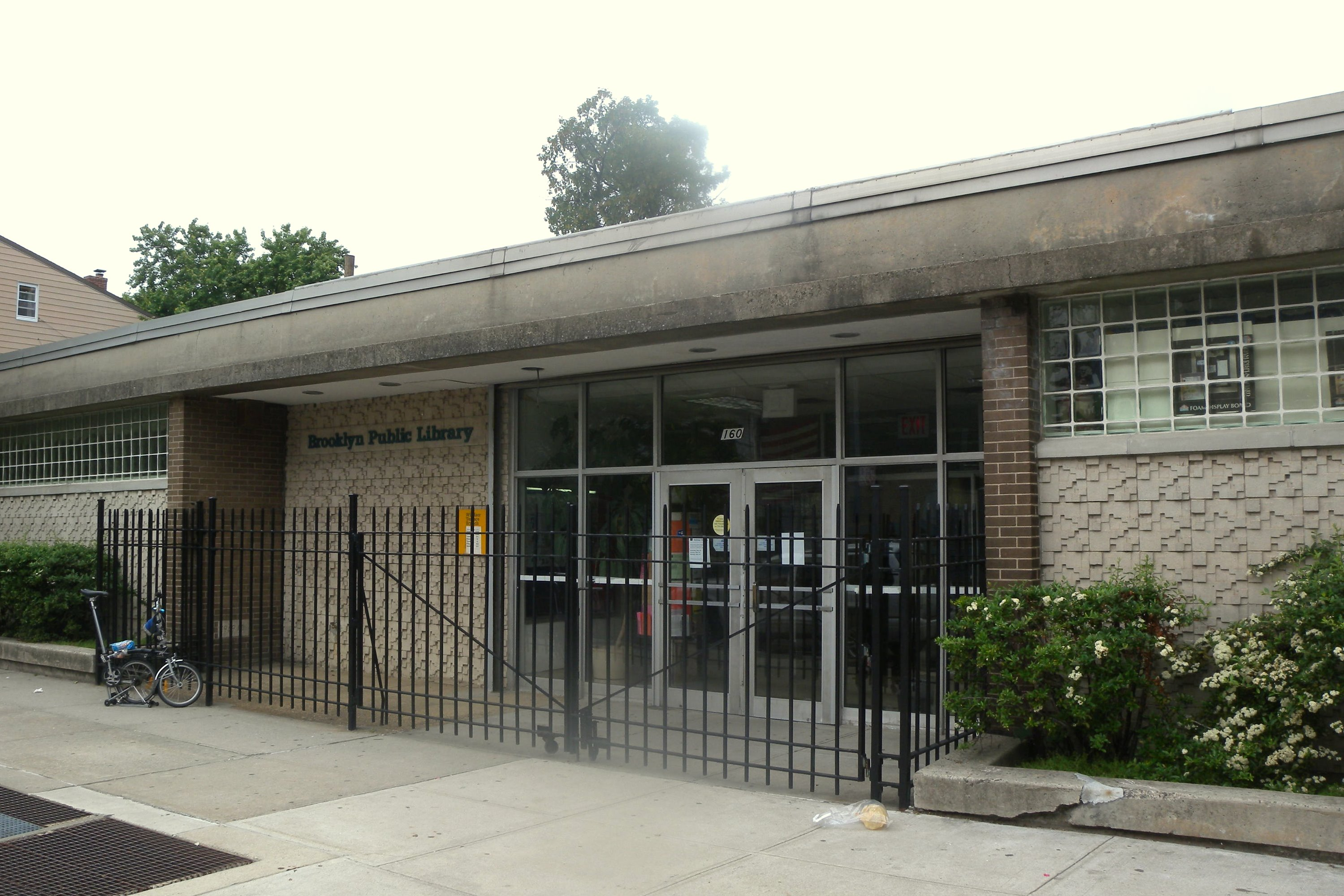
The Windsor Terrace branch of the Brooklyn Public Library

=== Schools ===
The neighborhood public elementary schools, PS 154 (The Windsor Terrace School) on 11th Avenue and PS 130 (The Parkside School) on Ocean Avenue, are well regarded. Each school features a number of enrichment programs for students, such as chess and journalism. In 2013–2014, 64% of PS 154 students met or exceeded Common Core standards in the English Language Arts (ELA) exams and 65% met or exceeded the standards on the math exams. At PS 130, 32% of ELA test-takers met or exceeded standards, and 41% did so on the math test. For the 2017–18 school year, PS 154 placed in the top 30% of all schools in New York for overall test scores (math proficiency is top 30%, and reading proficiency is top 20%). The percentage of students achieving proficiency in math was 77% (the New York state average was 52%) and the percentage of students achieving proficiency in reading/language arts was 82% (the New York state average was 52%). PS 130 placed in the top 50% of all schools in New York for overall test scores (math proficiency was top 50%, and reading proficiency was top 50%) for the 2017–18 school year. The percentage of students achieving proficiency in math was 62% and the percentage of students achieving proficiency in reading/language arts was 58%.

The NYCDOE district in which the schools are operated, District 15, was rezoned in 2014 due to an increased enrollment in the two schools; some students formerly zoned to PS 154 are now zoned to PS 130. This rezoning proved contentious, with some rezoned students' parents saying that the rezoning requires some students to travel over 0.5 miles (0.80 km) across "two highways" to get to school. In addition, since the rezoning, PS 154 has seen an increase in enrollment despite its decreased student catchment area; in 2016–2017, the school had its first-ever student waiting list, amid cuts to the school's pre-kindergarten program. There is also another public school nearby, PS 295 on 18th Street in Park Slope, to accommodate extra students from Windsor Terrace. In the 2012–2013 NYCDOE Progress Report, this school received an "A," garnering a quality score of 60.2 out of 100.

MS 839, serving grades 6–8, is located at 713 Caton Avenue. Brooklyn College Academy operates an annex site for freshmen and sophomore high school students at 350 Coney Island Avenue, with the juniors' and seniors' building at Brooklyn College.

The St. Joseph the Worker Catholic Academy opened in 2012. This Catholic school is a consolidation of Holy Name of Jesus and Immaculate Heart of Mary's elementary schools into Holy Name's existing infrastructure on 9th Avenue, offering Pre-K(3) to 8th Grade, including Honors Classes and after school programs. Another Catholic school, Bishop Ford High School, formerly operated at 500 19th Street in Windsor Terrace from 1952 to 2014. It closed in June 2014 due to lowered revenues from declining enrollment, with only 25% of its 2006 enrollment. The former school site is now the location of K280, a pre-kindergarten school, and MS 442 (School for Innovation).

=== Library ===
The Brooklyn Public Library's Windsor Terrace branch is located at East 5th Street at Fort Hamilton Parkway. It began as a "deposit station" with a small collection in 1922, but after 1940, service was intermittent after the library moved to a makeshift structure created out of two old streetcars. In 1969, it moved again into the current library building, which had been completed that year. The library was renovated in 1994, and again in 2011. In 2016, a campaign was started in which people were to "like" the library's Facebook page so that the library could get a garden; this was part of an initiative in which Facebook users from Brooklyn can vote on which Brooklyn Public Library branches could get $5,000 of extra funding for various programs. The library closed for a one-and-a-half-year renovation in February 2019.

== Transportation ==
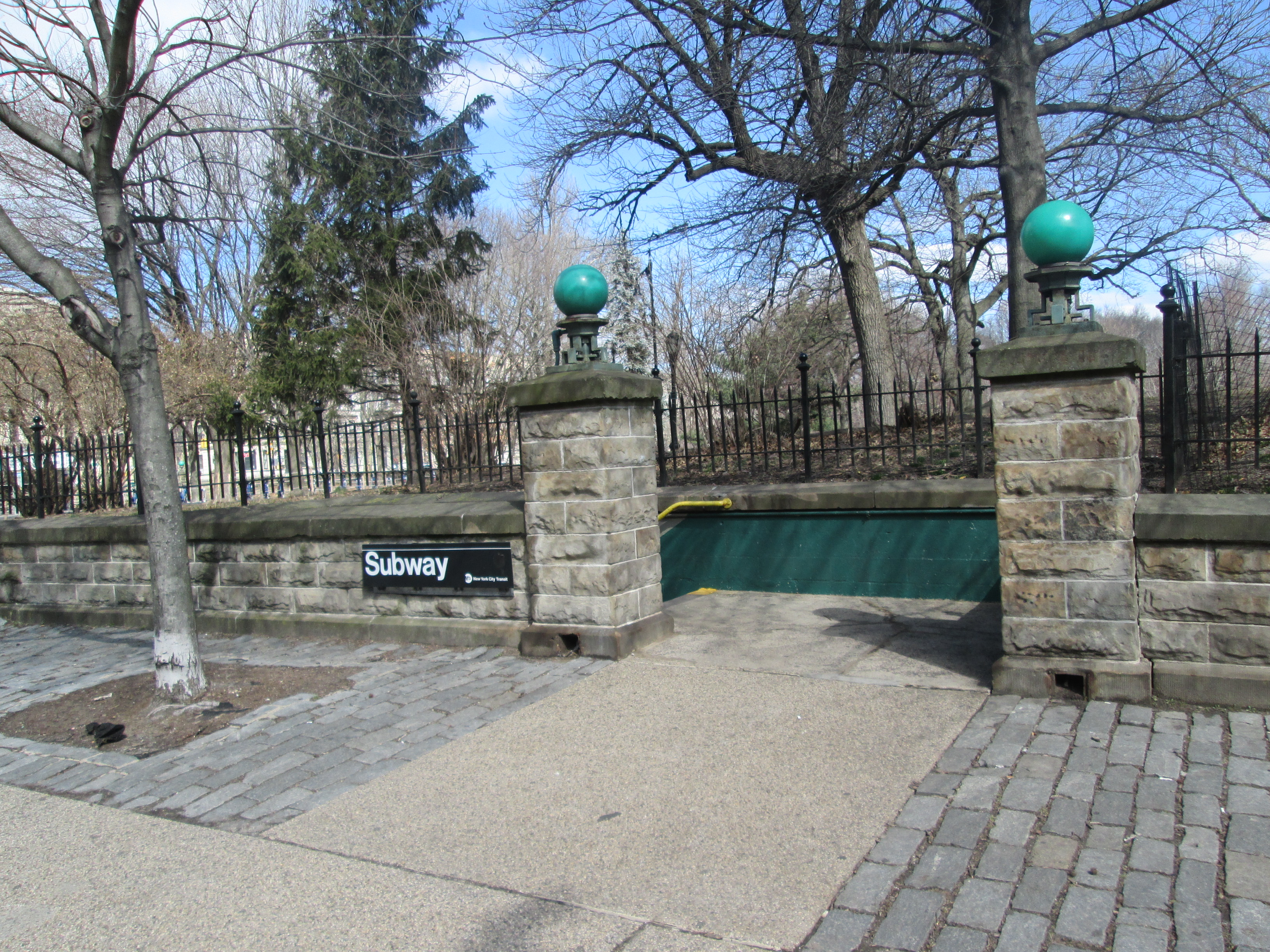
An entrance to the 15th Street–Prospect Park station

Windsor Terrace is served by the New York City Subway's 15th Street–Prospect Park and Fort Hamilton Parkway stations on the IND Culver Line (now carrying the F and G trains). The section of the line containing these two stations opened on October 7, 1933, as part of a "temporary" extension to Church Avenue in Kensington, where it was to have connected with Brooklyn–Manhattan Transit Corporation (BMT) subway services via a ramp to Ditmas Avenue. The former station, 15th Street, has stone entrances set into the park walls. The latter station, Fort Hamilton Parkway, has a long passageway due to its unusual location under the Prospect Expressway; its three entrances (one on Fort Hamilton Parkway itself, and two on Prospect Avenue) straddle the expressway, which splits the neighborhood in two.

MTA Regional Bus Operations operates bus routes in the area. As of 2016, there are four local bus routes: the B61, B67, B68, and B69. Several express buses and the B103 Limited bus pass through Windsor Terrace without stopping.

As elsewhere in Brooklyn, trolley service, operated by the BMT's rapid transit arm, ran in the neighborhood well into the 1950s and early '60s. The Seventh Avenue Line (now the B67 bus route) was converted from trolley to bus operations in 1951, and a year later, the Vanderbilt Avenue Line (now the B69) was similarly converted. A trolley barn, located between Green-Wood Cemetery and the Prospect Expressway, formerly served the Culver and Crosstown trolley lines on a site where a former federal prison was located during the American Civil War. It was replaced in 1962 by the Bishop Ford High School.

The Prospect Expressway, built between 1953 and 1960, runs through the middle of the neighborhood, with the majority of the neighborhood northeast of the expressway, and a small part of the neighborhood in the southwest connected by various bridges to the northeast section. Some neighborhood streets, such as Greenwood Avenue and Vanderbilt Place, were bisected by the expressway and remain so, while others, such as Seeley Street, 11th Avenue/Terrace Place, and Prospect Park W, are bridged over the highway. A plan to extend the highway along Ocean Parkway was never realized, though Ocean Parkway serves as a service road for the expressway for a short distance in southern Windsor Terrace. In the late 1950s, the Holy Name of Jesus Church led a failed effort to try to reroute the Prospect Expressway elsewhere or cancel the expressway altogether.

== Notable locations ==
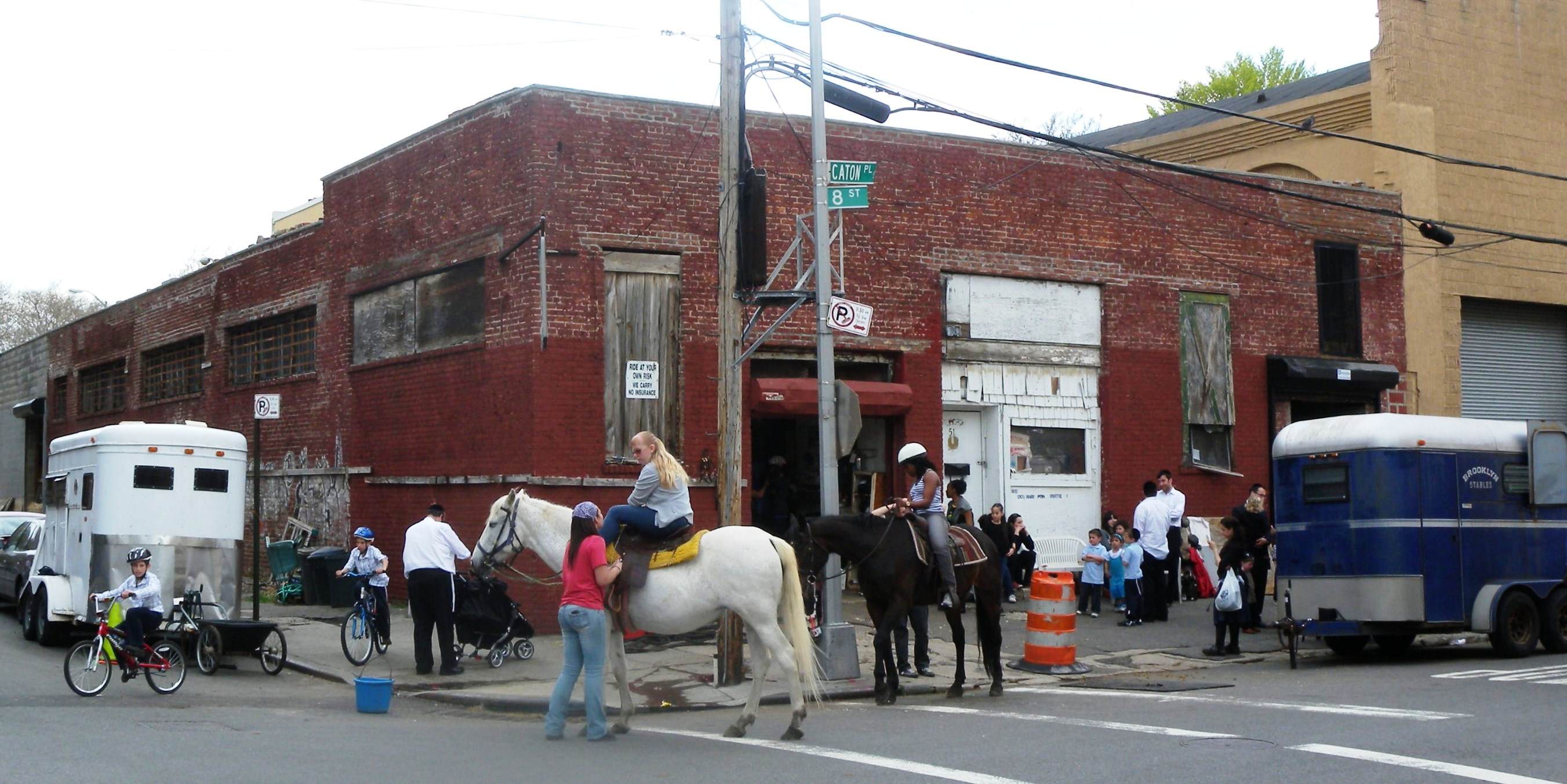
Kensington Stables

Kensington Stables is the only remaining stable near Prospect Park. In the days where horse stables saw a lot of business, there were many dozens of stables in the area. The barn was built in 1930 as the last extension of the riding academy at 11 Ocean Parkway, 57 Caton Place (built in 1917). The original riding academy closed in 1937 and is now a warehouse. By around the 1940s, the stables started to disappear, with some being converted into bowling alleys or roller skating rinks, and others just disappearing. Today, Kensington Stables gives lessons in The Shoe in Prospect Park. Kensington Stables now exists on the Windsor Terrace side of the border between Kensington and Windsor Terrace.

Bartel-Pritchard Square, in Windsor Terrace's northern extremity, is a traffic circle at the intersection of Prospect Park West, 15th Street, and Prospect Park Southwest. Its name commemorates local residents, Emil Bartel and William Pritchard, who died during World War I while in combat. The circle, which was dedicated under its current name in 1922, originally had a flower garden in its center. A black granite monument in the center of the circle—installed in 1965 as a result of a donation by the Patrick J. Devaney Post #964, VFW of the U.S.—memorializes all of the locals who have died in war. One side has the inscription "In memory of the men / of this community who / have given their lives / In wartime service/ to their country / Erected by / Patrick J. Devaney Post #964 / V.F.W. of U.S. / 1965" while the other side has the inscription "For Valor / and / Sacrifice / 1965". Like similar structures such as Times Square and Herald Square, the Bartel-Pritchard Square is geometrically not a square, despite its name. The park entrance adjoining Bartel–Pritchard Square is shaped as a gateway between two Stanford White-designed granite pillars with "what appears to be huge bronze lanterns" adorning the pillars' apexes. The pillars, which are based on an acanthus column in Delphi with sculptures on top, were unveiled in 1906, shortly after White had died.

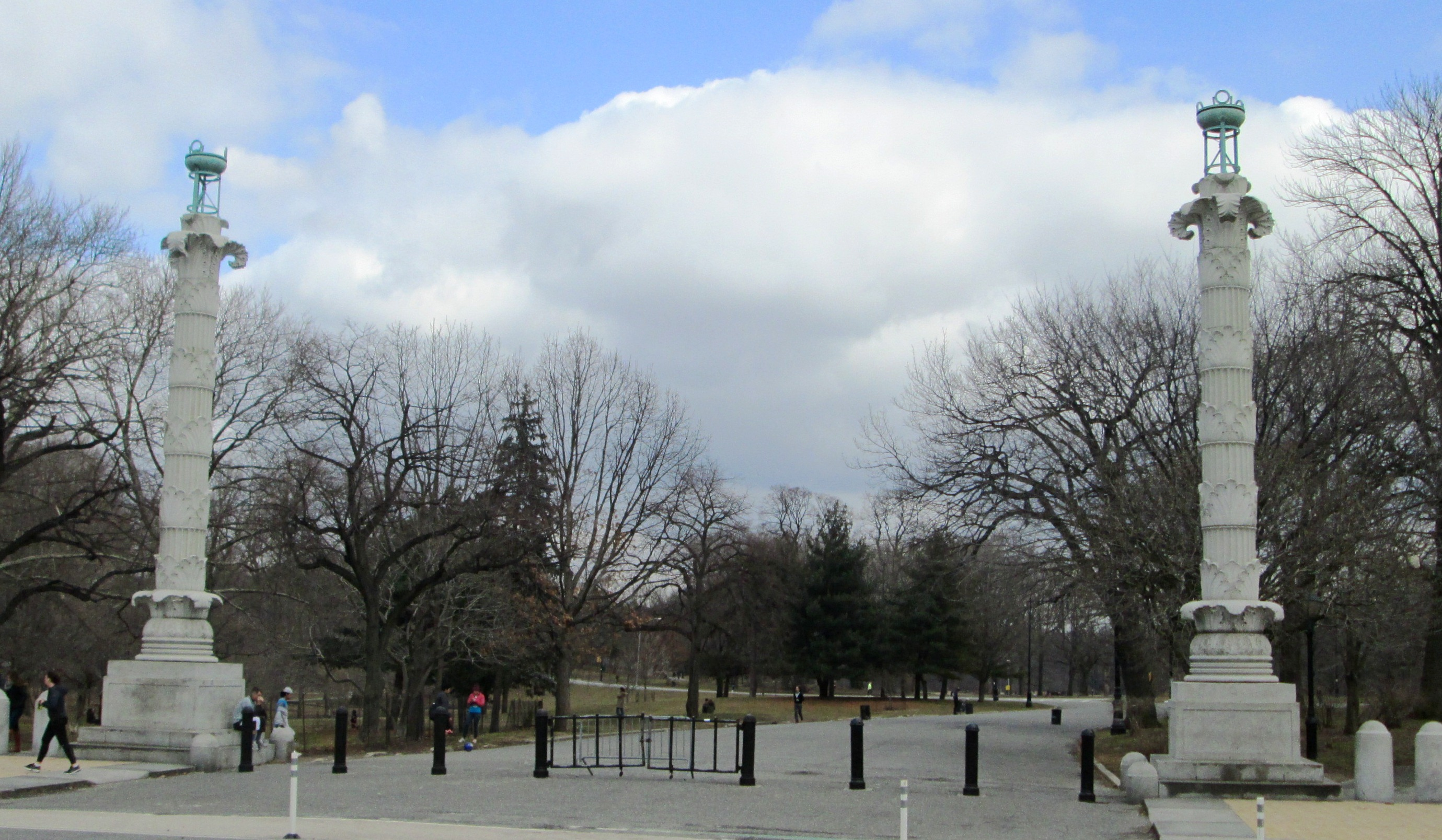
The columns at the park entrance outside Bartel-Pritchard Square

Since at least 1908, Windsor Terrace has had its own movie theater since the Marathon Theatre opened at present-day 188 Prospect Park W in 1908. The 500-seat Marathon Theatre had a Wurlitzer organ installed in 1927, shortly before its 1928 demolition. In August of that year, the 1,516-seat, Art Deco Sanders Theatre was opened on the site of the former Marathon Theatre, where it operated for half a century before its closure in 1976. The building stood vacant for twenty years after that, and investors bought the building in 1993 in hopes of reopening the theater. The Pavilion Theatre, a 3-screen movie theater within the defunct Sanders Theatre building, opened in 1996 to positive reception from the surrounding communities, which had experienced a cultural decline in prior years. The theater, which expanded to 9 screens in October 2004, suffered from complaints about broken toilets, poorly maintained seats, and sticky floors, as well as a rumor of bedbug-infested upholstery and malfunctions in the theater's heating system. In October 2016, the building was closed in preparation for conversion to a 7-screen, 650-seat theater. Operated by Nitehawk Cinema, the refurbished Pavilion Theatre, where patrons would be able to dine and watch movies simultaneously, was Nitehawk's second movie theater within Brooklyn. The renovated theater ultimately reopened on December 19, 2018.

Farrell's Bar & Grill, at 16th Street and Prospect Park W, is a noted community institution that has been continuously run by three owners since 1933. Famous among the fire and police officers who live in the community, it is said to be one of the first bars in New York City to get its liquor license at the end of Prohibition. It has been used as a standard bar backdrop in many film sequences. The neighborhood legend persists that until 1971, when Shirley MacLaine and Pete Hamill went into the bar during the filming of Desperate Characters and successfully demanded that MacLaine be served from the bar; until that time, Farrell's only served men at the bar and women at the rear of the establishment. Farrell's, which known for being open every day from 10 a.m. to 3 a.m., was closed for a nine-day renovation in 2006, marking the bar's longest duration of closure since Prohibition ended. Its iconic styrofoam cups filled with beer, a tradition since its cardboard "containers" were replaced by Styrofoam "containers" in 1985, were discontinued in 2015 following a citywide ban on Styrofoam food implements.

Due to Windsor Terrace's topography, there is a terminal moraine that ends in Windsor Terrace, creating a steep slope. As a result, at the location where the intersection of Seeley Street and Prospect Avenue would have been; Seeley Street uses a concrete arch bridge that spans 8 ft 7 in (2.62 m) above Prospect Avenue. The 143.7-foot (43.8 m) bridge was built by 1903 at a cost of $22,000, and is supported by underpinning since the IND subway runs under Prospect Avenue at this point. While street bridges that span other streets are more common in the hilly Bronx, they are rare in Brooklyn. This particular bridge does not appear on contemporary maps. The bridge has a stairway on its side that connects the two streets.

== Notable people ==
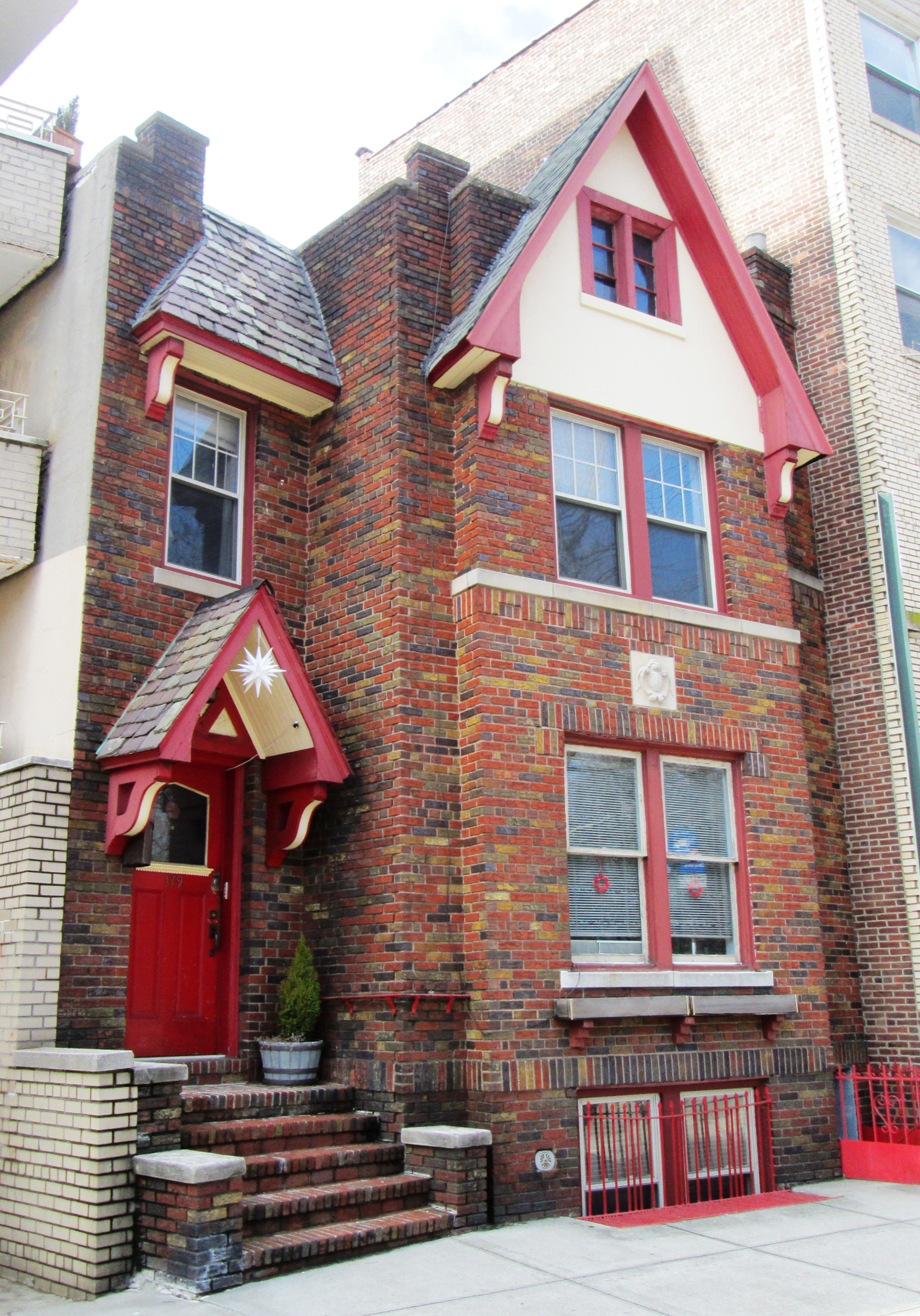
179 Prospect Park Southwest, a two-story brick house incongruously wedged in between two apartment buildings, was built around 1925.

Several notable Windsor Terrace residents are in the field of entertainment and media, including the actress Debi Mazar and her chef husband, Gabriele Corcos. The MSNBC news host Chris Hayes also lives in the neighborhood. Actress, comedian, writer, and producer Mindy Kaling lived in Windsor Terrace when she wrote her award-winning play Matt & Ben with then-roommate Brenda Withers. George Motz, described as "America's hamburger expert" and the host of the television series Burger Land, lives in Windsor Terrace.

Mallory Hagan, 2013's Miss America, was living in Windsor Terrace at the time that she won Miss America 2013, though older reports incorrectly mentioned that she lived in Park Slope.

Several writers of note have lived in Windsor Terrace, including Frank McCourt; Pete Hamill and Denis Hamill; and Paul Auster (although Auster's place of residence is considered to also be in Park Slope). Isaac Asimov lived in Windsor Terrace when his father ran a small candy store on Windsor Place. It is believed Asimov wrote his famous short story Nightfall in his bedroom in the family home across the street. The New York Times journalist Jonathan Mahler, author of Ladies and Gentlemen, the Bronx Is Burning is a Windsor Terrace resident, as is the New York Times bestselling novelist and memoirist Darin Strauss.

Chef Chris Scott and his wife operated several restaurants in Windsor Terrace, living in an apartment above the restaurants.

== In popular culture ==
- 1971 – Scenes for the film Desperate Characters were shot in Windsor Terrace.
- 1975 – Most of the Al Pacino film Dog Day Afternoon was filmed on Prospect Park W between 17th and 18th Streets in Windsor Terrace.
- 1985 – The film Turk 182, created by the Hamill brothers, shot some of its scenes in Windsor Terrace.
- 1994 – The opening scene in the Geena Davis film Angie was shot in Windsor Terrace on Fuller Place.
- 1995 – Director Wayne Wang's films Smoke and Blue in the Face were filmed at the former post office at the corner of 16th Street and Prospect Park W. Harvey Keitel, William Hurt, Madonna, Michael J. Fox, Lily Tomlin, and other actors spent significant time on set in Windsor Terrace.
- 1995 – In August, Alanis Morissette filmed the music video for "Hand In My Pocket" from her album Jagged Little Pill on Prospect Park W between Windsor Place and 16th Street.
- 1997 – As Good as It Gets shows Jack Nicholson and Helen Hunt kissing and walking through the streets of Prospect Park W and past the row houses that characterize the neighborhood. Hunt's character lived on Howard Place, one street down from Fuller Place where Geena Davis's character lived in Angie.
- 2000 – Farrell's Bar & Grill is seen in the film Pollock with Ed Harris.
- 2012 – The Amazing Spider-Man shot scenes on Fuller Place.
