= Bridge Cafe =

Coordinates: 40°42′31.3″N 74°00′03″W

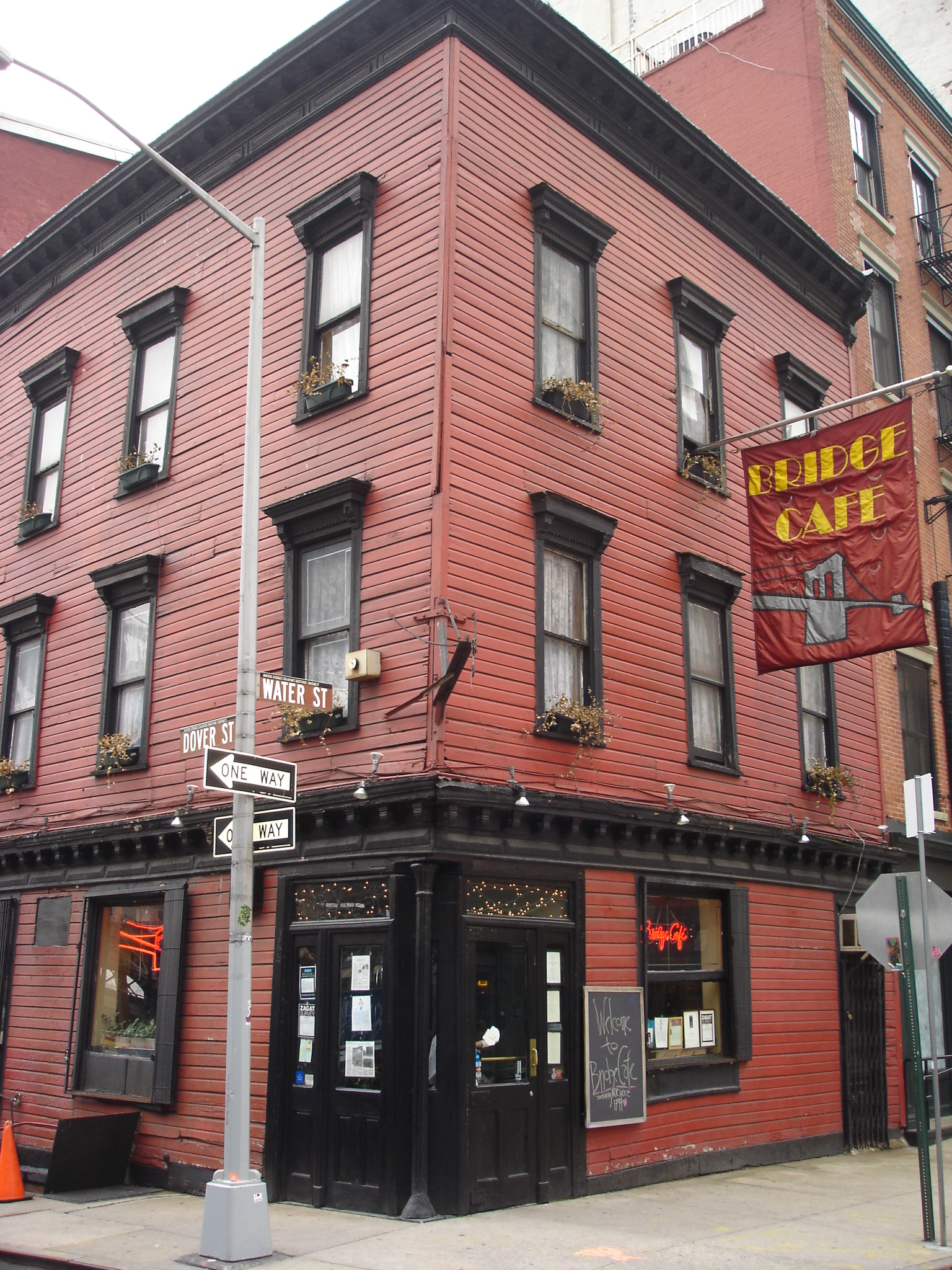
- Bridge Cafe near South Street Seaport
- Interactive map of Bridge Cafe

Restaurant information
- Established: 1794
- Location: 279 Water Street, New York City, New York, New York, 10038
- Website: http://bridgecafenyc.com/

Bridge Cafe was a historic restaurant and bar located at 279 Water Street in the South Street Seaport area of Manhattan, New York City, United States. The site was originally home to "a grocery and wine and porter bottler", opened in 1794, and has been home to a series of drinking and eating establishments. In the nineteenth century, the building was described in city directories variously as a grocery, a porterhouse, or a liquor establishment.

Despite its name, The Bridge Cafe building existed for almost a century before the construction of the Brooklyn Bridge. Until its 2012 closure, it was the city's oldest continuous business establishment, though the name and ownership had changed numerous times.

== History ==
Built in 1794, the building continues as one of last wooden framed buildings in lower Manhattan. Henry Williams operated a brothel there from 1847 to 1860 and the prostitutes were listed in the New York City census of 1855.

Maurice Hyland, who owned and ran the place from 1888 to 1890. In 1888, Hyland extended the old, two-and-a-half-story wooden building with a peaked roof into the present flat-topped three-story structure, with new wooden facades designed by Kurtzer & Rohl.

Through the 1970s McCormick’s Bar was frequented by local fishmongers due to proximity to historic Fulton Fish Market.

Although the building is not a landmark itself, it is in the South Street Seaport Historic District, created in 1977. The designation report notes that 279 Water, constructed in 1801, is the only remaining wood frame building in the historic district. Since Water Street is on landfill, at the time it was believed that brick buildings could not be supported.

In 1979 was purchased by Jack Weprin and converted into The Bridge Cafe, a white tablecloth establishment.

== 2012 Damage & Closure ==
The building was damaged during Hurricane Sandy, and the restaurant remains closed as of 2020.

A 2020 report states that "it unfortunately closed after Hurricane Sandy inundated the building in 2012 and has remained closed ever since". A reconstruction did commence but a report in March 2020 stated that owner Adam Weprin had encountered difficulties; at that time, he said that "'Unfortunately, many factors will play a part in the opening. In addition to replacing the floors, there are other costly repairs' ... but he remained committed to a reopening.

In 2021, with the deed signed away by Michael Weprin for $3.3 million, the building changed hands once again.

== Netflix and the Future ==
In April 2024 Netflix began scouting for locations in New York City for the “Black Rabbit” series starring Jason Bateman and Jude Law and discovered the former cafe, which was used as inspiration for the shows interiors. There were eight one-hour episodes, released in 2025, revolving around “a New York City hotspot owner who lets his brother back into his life, which leads to dangerous consequences.”

== Legacy ==
While in office, Mayor Edward I. Koch regularly had dinner at Bridge Cafe and declared it to be his favorite restaurant.

New York Magazine considered it to be one of New York City's Top 5 Historic Bars in 2005.
