= Harry McCormick =

American painter

Harry McCormick (Bayonne, New Jersey, 1942-Jacksonville, Florida, July 2023) is a contemporary American painter noted for his closely observed renderings of shadow, light, and reflections in interior spaces. His paintings often capture one or two solitary individuals in moments of introspection. He was born in New Jersey on June 12, 1942, and is primarily self-taught as an artist.

== Museums and collections ==
- Birmingham Museum of Art, Alabama
- Boca Raton Museum of Art, Boca Raton, Florida
- Charles B Goddard Art Center, Ardmore, Oklahoma
- Canton Art Institute, Canton Ohio
- Griffith Art Center, Canton, Ohio
- Jesse Besser Museum, Michigan
- Mr. Mel Brooks and Ms. Anne Bancroft
- Fairleigh Dickinson University, Rutherford, NY
- Newark Museum, New Jersey
- Smithsonian Institution, Washington, DC
- St. Mary's College of Maryland
- Syracuse University Collection, Syracuse, NY
- University of Southern Illinois
- Wichita State University Collection, Kansas
- Vatican Collection, Rome, Italy
