= Perch (disambiguation) =

Perch may refer to:

- Perch (surname), a surname (and list of people with that name)
- Perch (unit), unit of measure for length, area, or volume
- Perch SSSI a Site of Special Scientific Interest in Somerset, England
- Perch (equilibristic), an equilibristic balancing act
- The Perch (Binsey), a historic pub in Binsey, Oxfordshire, England
- The Perch, a historic house in Austin, Texas, USA, part of Granger House and The Perch
- Submarine USS Perch (SS-176)
- Submarine USS Perch (SS-313)

== Fish ==
- Perch, the common name for the freshwater fish in the genus Perca
  - Balkhash perch (Perca schrenkii)
  - European perch (Perca fluviatilis)
  - Yellow perch (Perca flavescens)
- Temperate perch, fish of the family Percichthyidae
- Several other species of fish, including:
  - Surfperch (Embiotocidae) several species, northern Pacific shore fish, including
    - Shiner perch (Cymatogaster aggregata)
    - Pile perch, genus Rhacochilus along with shiner perch, commonly seen around pier pilings along the Pacific shore of North America
  - Barber perch (Caesioperca rasor)
  - Estuary perch (Macquaria colonorum)
  - Golden perch (Macquaria ambigua)
  - Macquarie perch (Macquaria australasica)
  - Nile perch (Lates niloticus)
  - Pirate perch (Aphredoderus sayanus)
  - White perch (Morone americana)
  - Rock perch (Ambloplites rupestris)
  - Sacramento perch (Archoplites interruptus)
  - Silver perch several species, including:
    - Bairdiella chrysoura, native to the East Coast of the United States
    - Bidyanus bidyanus, endemic to Australia
    - Leiopotherapon plumbeus, endemic to the Philippines
  - Climbing perch family (climbing gourami, Anabantidae)
  - Lepomis species are often called perch in some areas of the United States, especially in the Ozarks region.
  - Japanese perch (Coreoperca kawamebari)
  - Pond perch (Lepomis gibbosus)
  - Blue perch (Badis badis)
- Japanese seaperch, the common name for the saltwater fish in the genus Sebastes
  - Japanese white seaperch (Sebastes cheni)
  - Japanese red seaperch (Sebastes inermis)
  - Japanese black seaperch (Sebastes ventricosus)

== See also ==
- Porch (disambiguation)
- Pershing (disambiguation)
