= The Perch =

The Perch may refer to:

- The Perch, Binsey, a pub
- The Perch SSSI, biological Site of Special Scientific Interest in Somerset
- Granger House and The Perch, historic residence in Texas

== See also ==
- Perch (disambiguation)
