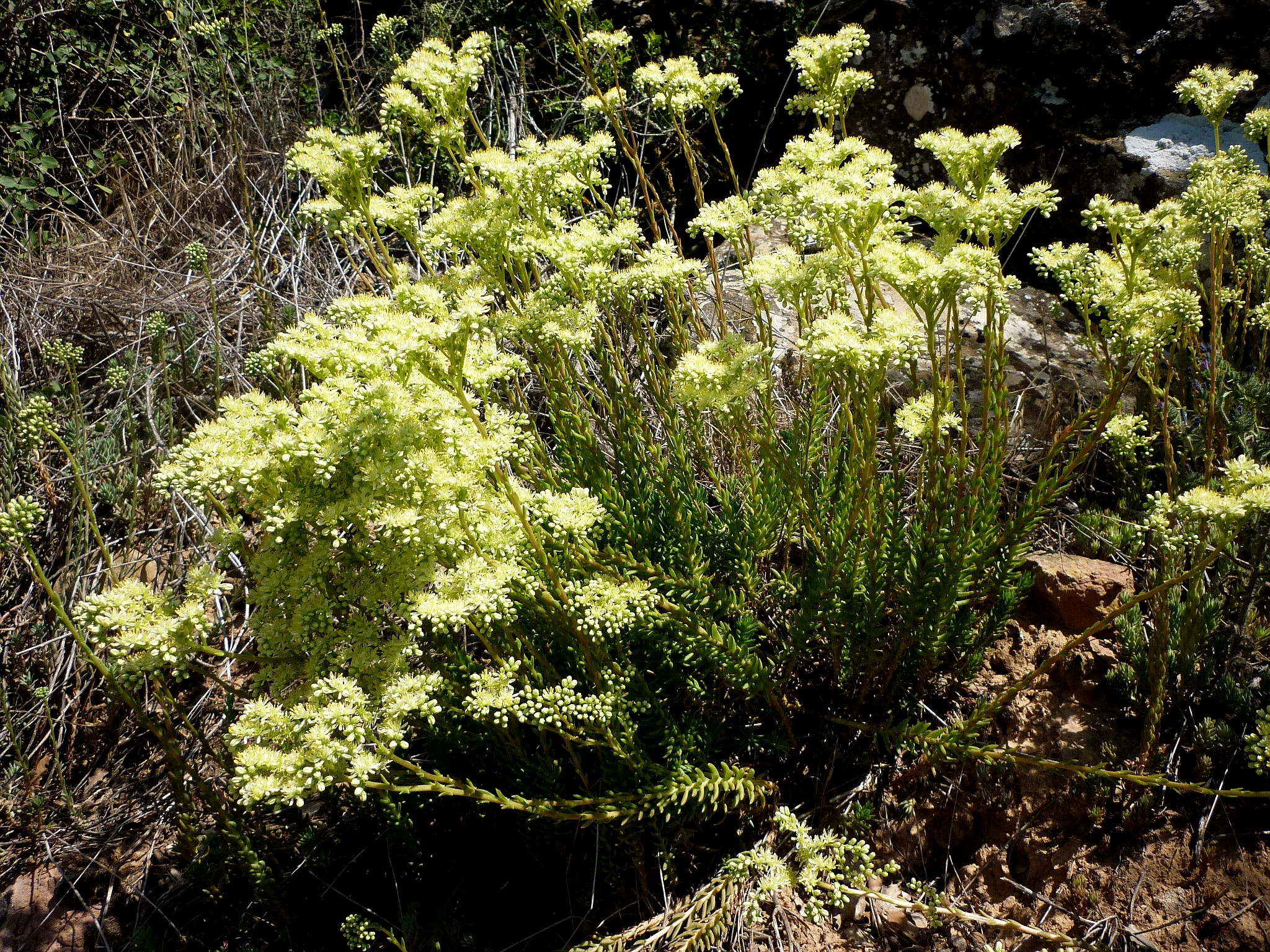

Scientific classification
- Kingdom: Plantae
- Clade: Embryophytes
- Clade: Tracheophytes
- Clade: Spermatophytes
- Clade: Angiosperms
- Clade: Eudicots
- Order: Saxifragales
- Family: Crassulaceae
- Genus: Petrosedum
- Species: P. sediforme

Binomial name
- Petrosedum sediforme (Jacq.) Pau

= Petrosedum sediforme =

Species of succulent

Petrosedum sediforme, the pale stonecrop, is a perennial flowering plant in the family Crassulaceae. It is naturally distributed throughout the Mediterranean Basin, from Portugal in the west to Syria in the east. It is similar to other species of Petrosedum, but grows taller, and may be used in cooking or as an ornamental plant.

== Distribution ==
The natural range of Petrosedum sediforme extends throughout the Mediterranean Basin. It is found in Portugal, Spain, France, Italy, and Mediterranean islands, as well as Turkey, Palestine, Israel, Libya, Syria, Tunisia, Algeria, and Morocco. It typically grows in lowland areas, often near the sea on dunes or coastal cliffs, but it can also be found at higher elevations, reaching up to 1000 meters in the French Alps and 1750 meters in the Sierra Nevada. It prefers open, sunny habitats, but tolerates a wide range of climates and environmental conditions. It is commonly (but not exclusively) found in limestone.

Specimens of Petrosedum sediforme have been found with varying chromosome counts, including 2n=32/48/60/64/96. Diploid forms (2n=32) are generally confined to lowland environments. Hexaploids (2n=96) predominantly inhabit mountainous areas, whereas tetraploids (2n=64) show no distinct habitat preference. A striking cristate form, propagated from seed, has been introduced in horticulture. A naturally occurring hybrid between Petrosedum forsterianum and P. sediforme was discovered in Portugal and described in 2015 as Petrosedum × estrelae.

== Description ==
Petrosedum sediforme is a branching species with often woody, non-flowering basal shoots. Leaves are overlapping, oblong to elliptic, with pointed tips, somewhat thickened, sometimes flattened and spurred, reaching up to 20 mm in length. They are smooth, dark green, and often glaucous. Because its leaves are remarkably succulent, the species does not go through dormancy during the summer.

When in bloom, Petrosedum sediforme produces upright flowering stems that range from 25 to 60 cm tall. The flowers grow in clusters at the top of the stem, with each flower attached by a very short stalk or none at all. The small green triangular sepals (the outer parts that protect the flower bud) are about 2–3 mm long. The petals are oblong, greenish-white to creamy in color, and about 5–8 mm long. The plant usually has 6–8 petals per flower, rarely 5 or 9. The stamens (the parts that hold pollen) have white filaments with a rough texture at the base and yellow anthers. The flowers are produced in mid-summer. They are followed by erect, dark brown fruit. Seeds are oblong, brown, and ribbed.

Petrosedum sediforme is difficult to distinguish from P. rupestre, P. ochroleucum, and P. montanum based solely on vegetative traits. Spanish plants with brownish or olive-green tones are remarkably similar to some Israeli specimens—despite originating from the opposite end of the species’ range. In the Sierra Nevada, even plants growing side by side can exhibit striking differences.

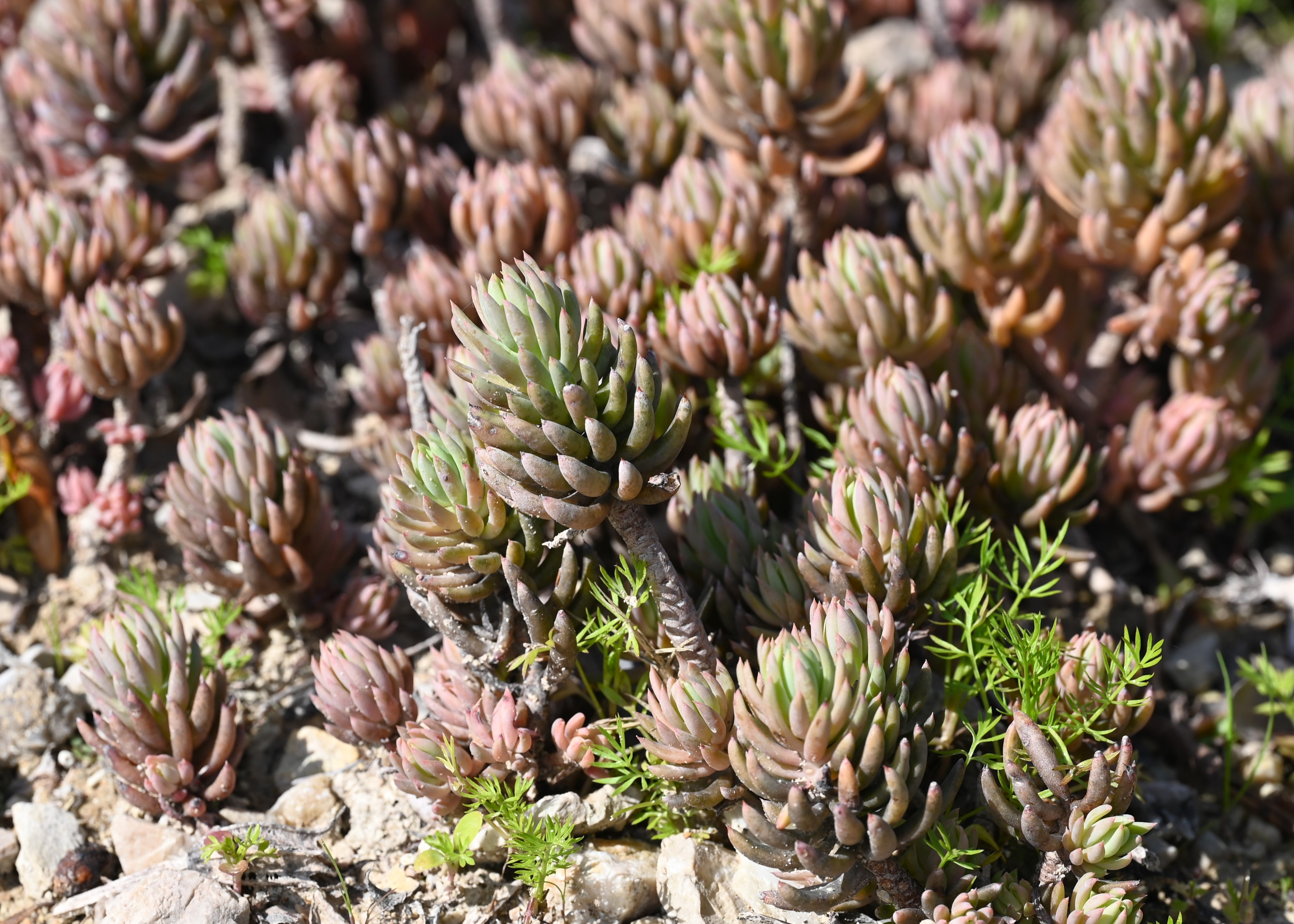
Foliage closeup

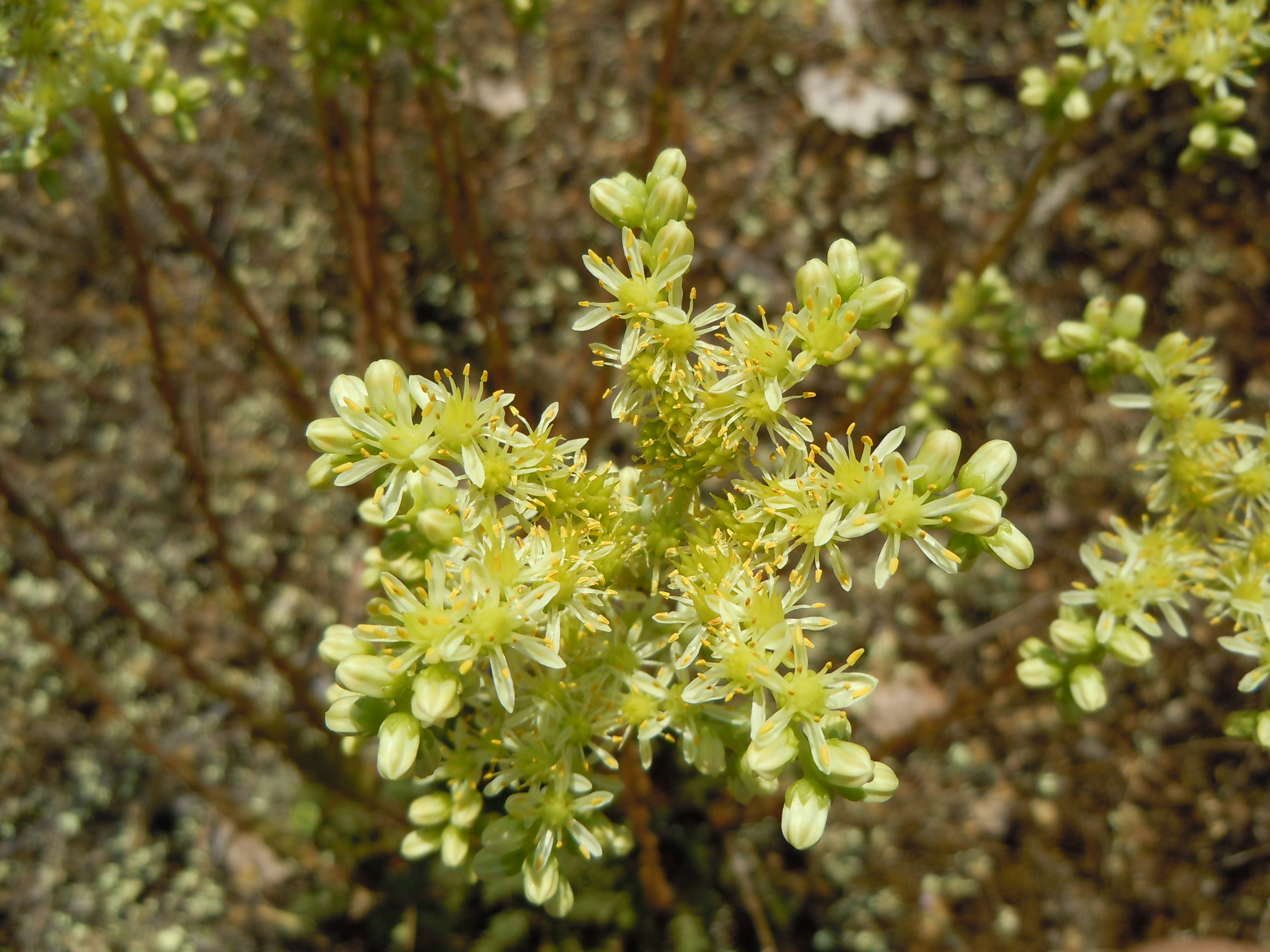
Inflorescence detail

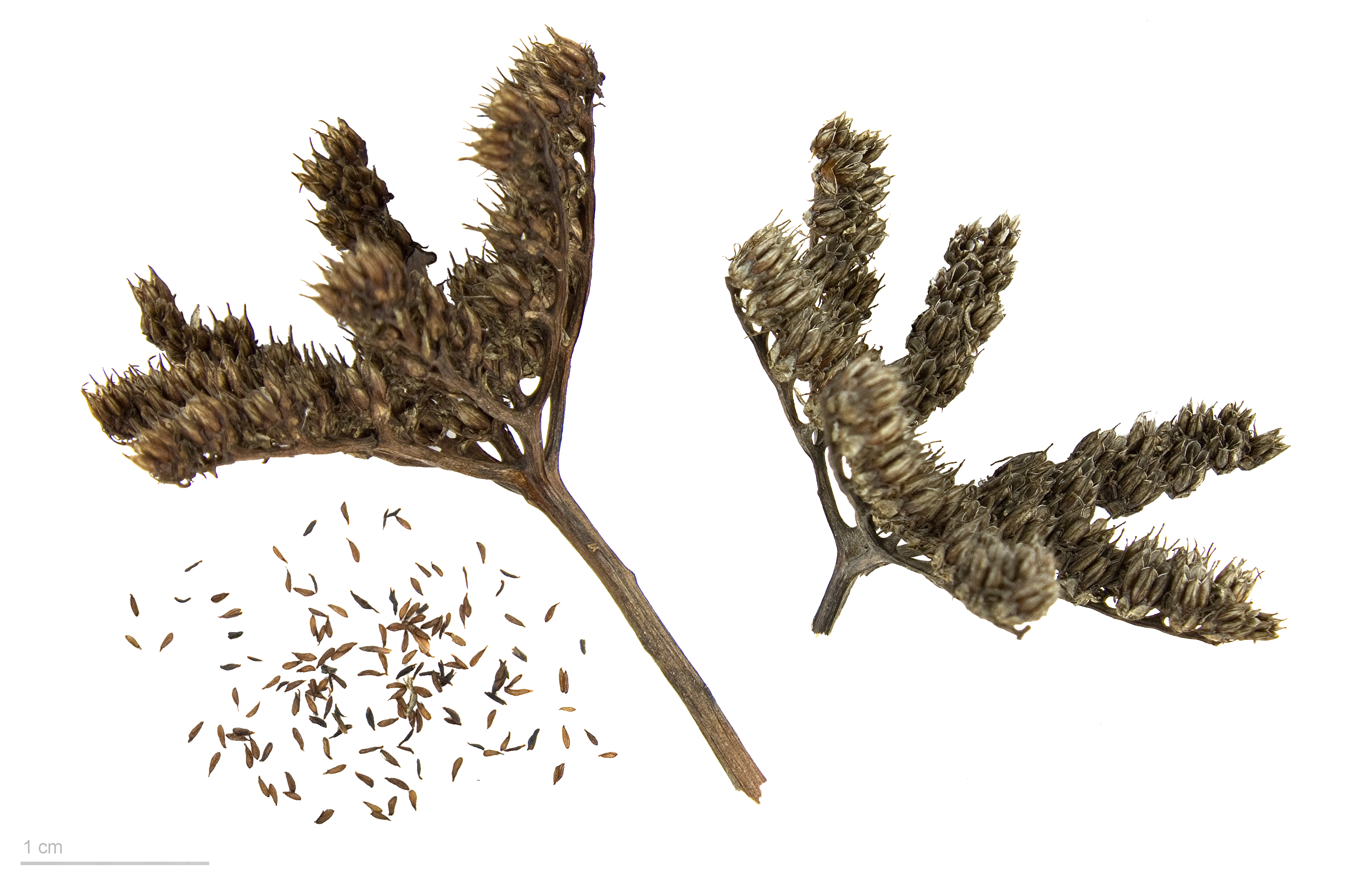
Fruit and seed

== Uses ==
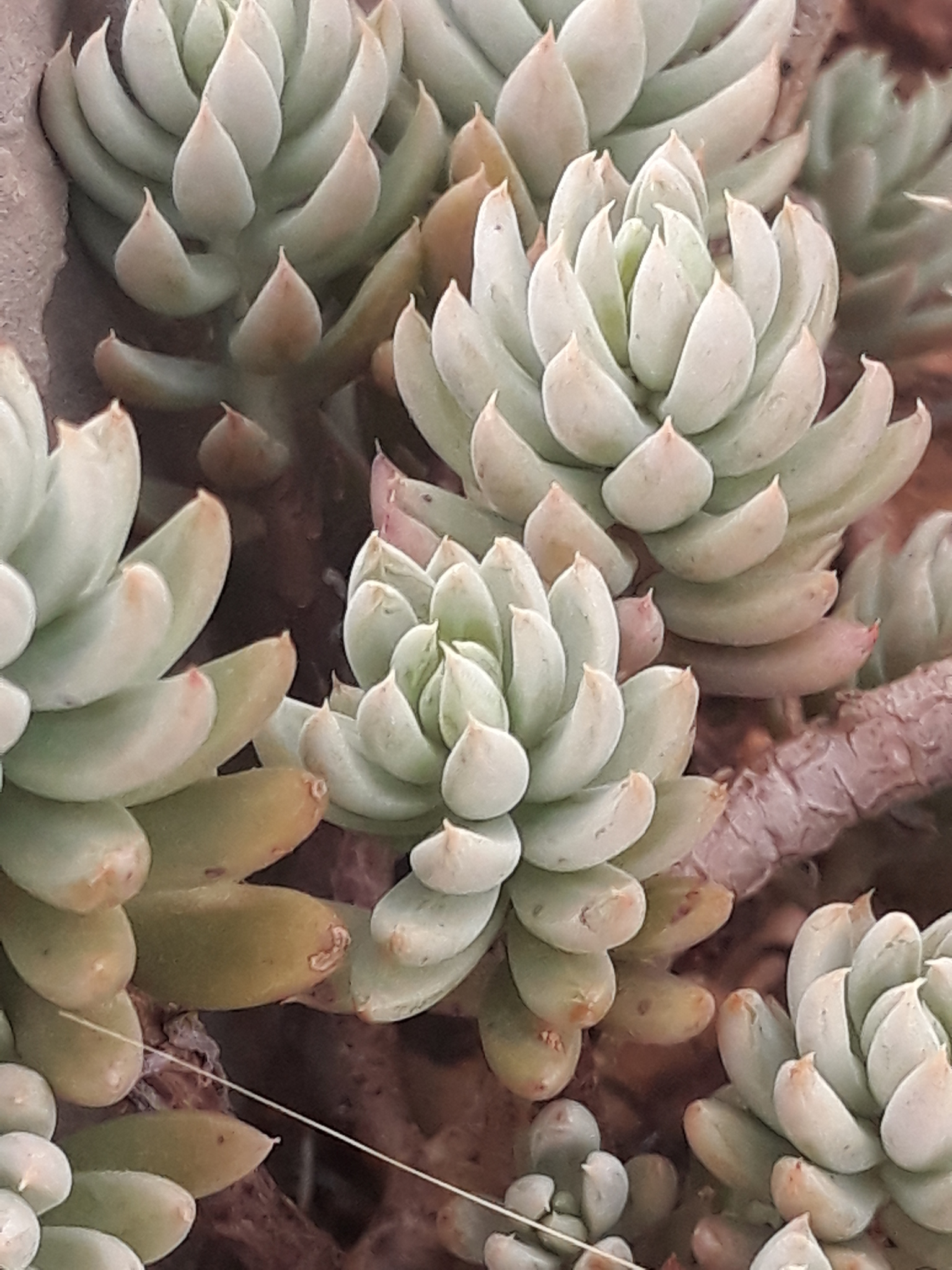
Glaucous forms are particularly valued in horticulture.

Petrosedum sediforme is sometimes cultivated as an ornamental plant in rock gardens. Forms with broad leaves from Portugal and Spain are particularly valued for their compact growth, and those with glaucous leaves are particularly popular. In contrast, those from higher elevations in France are more resilient, although they lack the same visual appeal. Compared to other Petrosedum species, P. sediforme has a more refined appearance, but it also has a tendency to grow tall. The species is edible; its leaves may be used in cooking as a pot-herb.
