= Pershing =

Pershing may refer to:

== Military ==
- John J. Pershing (1860–1948), U.S. General of the Armies
  - MGM-31 Pershing, U.S. ballistic missile system
  - Pershing II Weapon System, U.S. ballistic missile
  - M26 Pershing, U.S. tank
  - Pershing boot, a type of boot used by U.S. soldiers in World War I
  - Pershing Rifles, U.S. college military fraternal organization founded 1894

== Companies ==
- Pershing, an Italian yachtbuilding company, part of the Ferretti Group as of 2004
- Pershing LLC, a financial brokerage and custodian, and a subsidiary of the Bank of New York Mellon
- Pershing Square Capital Management, a US hedge fund

== Places ==
France

- Stade Pershing (Pershing Stadium), a stadium in Vincennes, France

United States

- Pershing, Oklahoma
- Pershing, Wisconsin, a town
- Pershing County, Nevada
- Pershing Center, an arena in Lincoln, Nebraska
- Pershing Park, a small park in Washington, D.C.
- Pershing Road (Hudson County), a road along the face of the Hudson Palisades
- Pershing Township (disambiguation)

== People with the name Pershing ==
- John J. Pershing (1860–1948), American United States Army officer.
- Louise Pershing (1904–1986), American painter, sculptor

== Other ==
- Pershing (album), an album by indie pop/rock band Someone Still Loves You Boris Yeltsin
- Pershing (doughnut), a type of doughnut
- General Pershing (motor ship), a five masted bald-headed schooner
- Pershing High School, Detroit, Michigan
- Pershing Middle School (San Diego), San Diego, California

== See also ==
- Pershing Square (disambiguation)
- Persian (roll)
