= Common name =

Name generally used for a taxon, group of taxa, or organism(s)

Common names (such as "red fox") are different across languages, whereas the scientific name does not change.

In biology, a common name (Note: Also known as a vernacular name, English name, colloquial name, country name, popular name, or farmer's name.) is a name of a taxon or organism that is based on the normal language of everyday life. It may happen that the same name is used for different organisms in different regions ("robin" is used for several unrelated species of birds), or that the same organism is referred to by different names (cougar, puma, mountain lion, panther); and different languages use different names (cat, gato, chat, 貓...) Many, but not all, organisms have a common name. Organisms—viruses, bacteria, plants, animals, etc.—are also given unique Latin-based scientific names, usually unrelated to the common name; for example the European robin is referred to as Erithacus rubecula in all languages.

In chemistry, IUPAC defines a common name as one that, although it unambiguously defines a chemical, does not follow the current systematic naming convention, such as acetone, systematically 2-propanone, while a vernacular name describes one used in a lab, trade or industry that does not unambiguously describe a single chemical, such as copper sulfate, which may refer to either copper(I) sulfate or copper(II) sulfate.

Sometimes common names are created by authorities on one particular subject, in an attempt to make it possible for members of the general public (including such interested parties as fishermen, farmers, etc.) to be able to refer to a particular organism without needing to learn the scientific name. Creating an "official" list of common names can also be an attempt to standardize the use of common names, which can sometimes vary a great deal between one part of a country and another, as well as between one country and another country, even where the same language is spoken in both places. The use of the word common in no way implies that a common name is commonly recognized, since authors routinely create new common names at will.

== Use as part of folk taxonomy ==
A common name intrinsically plays a part in a classification of objects, typically an incomplete and informal classification, in which some names are degenerate examples in that they are unique and lack reference to any other name, as is the case with say, ginkgo, okapi, and ratel. Folk taxonomy, which is a classification of objects using common names, has no formal rules and need not be consistent or logical in its assignment of names, so that say, not all flies are called flies (for example Braulidae, the so-called "bee lice") and not every animal called a fly is indeed a fly (such as dragonflies and mayflies). In contrast, scientific or biological nomenclature is a global system that attempts to denote particular organisms or taxa uniquely and definitively, on the assumption that such organisms or taxa are well-defined and generally also have well-defined interrelationships; accordingly the ICN and ICZN have formal rules for biological nomenclature and convene periodic international meetings to further that purpose.

== Common names and the binomial system ==
The form of scientific names for organisms, called binomial nomenclature, is superficially similar to the noun-adjective form of vernacular names or common names which were used by non-modern cultures. A collective name such as owl was made more precise by the addition of an adjective such as screech. Linnaeus himself published a flora of his homeland Sweden, Flora Svecica (1745), and in this, he recorded the Swedish common names, region by region, as well as the scientific names. The Swedish common names were all binomials (e.g. plant no. 84 Råg-losta and plant no. 85 Ren-losta); the vernacular binomial system thus preceded his scientific binomial system.

Linnaean authority William T. Stearn said:

By the introduction of his binomial system of nomenclature, Linnaeus gave plants and animals an essentially Latin nomenclature like vernacular nomenclature in style but linked to published, and hence relatively stable and verifiable, scientific concepts and thus suitable for international use.

There is just one organism whose common name is identical to its binomial name, the boa constrictor.

== Geographic range of use ==
The geographic range over which a particularly common name is used varies; some common names have a very local application, while others are virtually universal within a particular language. Some such names even apply across ranges of languages; the word for cat, for instance, is easily recognizable in most Germanic and many Romance languages. Many vernacular names, however, are restricted to a single country and colloquial names to local districts.

Some languages also have more than one common name for the same animal. For example, in Irish, there are many terms that are considered outdated but still well-known for their somewhat humorous and poetic descriptive names of animals.

Examples of common name variants
Scientific name	English name	Irish terms w/ literal translations of the poetic terms
Vulpes vulpes	Red fox	Madra rua ("red dog") or sionnach
Lutra lutra	Otter	Madra uisce ("water dog") or dobharchú
Canis lupus	Wolf	Mac Tíre ("son of the land") or faolchú
Chiroptera (order)	Bats	Sciathán leathair ("leather wing") or ialtóg

== Constraints and problems ==
Common names are used in the writings of both professionals and lay people. Lay people sometimes object to the use of scientific names over common names, but the use of scientific names can be defended, as it is in these remarks from a book on marine fish:

- Because common names often have a very local distribution, the same organism may have different common names in different places. It also happens that people who migrate to a different region deliberately use familiar common names for local animals; for example English settlers in America gave the name "robin" to a red-breasted bird unrelated to the European robin.
- A single species of organism may be called by several common names because individuals in the species are thought to be different species because they differ in appearance depending on their maturity, gender, or can vary in appearance as a morphological response to their natural surroundings, i.e. ecophenotypic variation.
- Conversely, a single common name may be used in the same region for different species of organism. People might simply not recognise or care about minor differences in appearance between distantly related or unrelated species. See "bass", "perch", "spookfish", and "sunfish". Many different species are called water rat. Among plants, culinary Laurus nobilis and toxic Prunus laurocerasus and Daphne laureola are all called laurel.
- In contrast to common names, formal taxonomic names imply biological relationships between similarly named creatures.
- Because of incidental events, contact with other languages, or simple confusion, common names in a given region can change with time. For example, the "coney" became "rabbit" (or "bunny").
- In a book that lists over 1200 species of fishes more than half have no widely recognised common name; they either are too nondescript or too rarely seen to have earned any widely accepted common name.
- Many species that are rare, hidden or too small to be easily seen, such as microorganisms and some insects, or lack economic importance, do not have a common name.

== Coining common names ==
In scientific binomial nomenclature, names commonly are derived from classical or modern Latin or Greek or Latinised forms of vernacular words or coinages; such names are often perceived as difficult for laymen to learn, remember, and pronounce and so, in such books as field guides, authors commonly publish lists of coined common names. Counterexamples, however, are numerous; laymen routinely use the scientific names of dinosaurs (e.g., Tyrannosaurus, Triceratops, Velociraptor), as well as many common garden flowers (e.g., Iris, Petunia, Chrysanthemum, Rhododendron), and scientific names are sometimes shorter than the common names (e.g., Ia io, the "great evening bat"). Many examples of common names simply are attempts to translate the scientific name into English or some other vernacular. Such translation may be confusing in itself, or confusingly inaccurate, for example, gratiosus does not mean "gracious" and gracilis does not mean "graceful".

The practice of coining common names has long been discouraged; de Candolle's Laws of Botanical Nomenclature, 1868, the non-binding recommendations that form the basis of the modern (now binding) International Code of Nomenclature for algae, fungi, and plants contains the following:

Art. 68. Every friend of science ought to be opposed to the introduction into a modern language of names of plants that are not already there unless they are derived from a Latin botanical name that has undergone but a slight alteration. ... ought the fabrication of names termed vulgar names, totally different from Latin ones, to be proscribed. The public to whom they are addressed derives no advantage from them because they are novelties. Lindley's work, The Vegetable Kingdom, would have been better relished in England had not the author introduced into it so many new English names, that are to be found in no dictionary, and that do not preclude the necessity of learning with what Latin names they are synonymous. A tolerable idea may be given of the danger of too great a multiplicity of vulgar names, by imagining what geography would be, or, for instance, the Post-office administration, supposing every town had a totally different name in every language.

Various bodies and the authors of many technical and semi-technical books do not simply adapt existing common names for various organisms; they try to coin (and put into common use) comprehensive, useful, authoritative, and standardised lists of new names. The purpose typically is:

- to create names from scratch where no common names exist
- to impose a particular choice of name where there is more than one common name
- to improve existing common names
- to replace them with names that conform more to the relatedness of the organisms

Other attempts to reconcile differences between widely separated regions, traditions, and languages, by arbitrarily imposing nomenclature, often reflect narrow perspectives and have unfortunate outcomes. For example, members of the genus Burhinus (which translates as "ox nose") occur in Australia, Southern Africa, Eurasia, and South America. A recent trend in field manuals and bird lists is to use the name "thick-knee" for members of the genus. This, in spite of the fact that the majority of the species occur in non-English-speaking regions and have various common names, not always English. For example, "Dikkop" is the centuries-old South African vernacular name for their two local species: Burhinus capensis is the Cape dikkop (or "gewone dikkop", not to mention the presumably much older Zulu name "umBangaqhwa"); Burhinus vermiculatus is the "water dikkop". The thick joints in question are not even, in fact, the birds' knees, but the intertarsal joints—in lay terms the ankles. Furthermore, not all species in the genus have "thick knees", so the thickness of the "knees" of some species is not of clearly descriptive significance. The family Burhinidae has members that have various common names even in English, including "stone curlews", so the choice of the name "thick-knees" is not easy to defend but is a clear illustration of the hazards of the facile coinage of terminology.

== Lists that include common names ==
=== Lists of general interest ===
Plants

- Plant by common name
- Garden plants
- Culinary herbs and spices
- Poisonous plants
- Plants in the Bible
- Vegetables
- Useful plants

Animals

- Birds by region
- Mammals by region
- List of fish common names

Plants and animals

- Invasive species

=== Collective nouns ===
Groups of several animals of the same species are referred to by species-specific collective nouns, for example a flock of sheep, pack of wolves.

=== Official lists ===
Some organizations have created official lists of common names, or guidelines for creating common names, hoping to standardize the use of common names.

For example, the Australian Fish Names List or AFNS was compiled through a process involving work by taxonomic and seafood industry experts, drafted using the CAAB (Codes for Australian Aquatic Biota) taxon management system of the CSIRO, and including input through public and industry consultations by the Australian Fish Names Committee (AFNC). The AFNS has been an official Australian Standard since July 2007 and has existed in draft form (The Australian Fish Names List) since 2001. Seafood Services Australia (SSA) serve as the Secretariat for the AFNC. SSA is an accredited Standards Australia (Australia's peak non-government standards development organisation) Standards Development

The Entomological Society of America maintains a database of official common names of insects, and proposals for new entries must be submitted and reviewed by a formal committee before being added to the listing.

Efforts to standardize English names for the amphibians and reptiles of North America (north of Mexico) began in the mid-1950s. The dynamic nature of taxonomy necessitates periodical updates and changes in the nomenclature of both scientific and common names. The Society for the Study of Amphibians and Reptiles (SSAR) published an updated list in 1978, largely following the previous established examples, and subsequently published eight revised editions ending in 2017. More recently the SSAR switched to an online version with a searchable database. Standardized names for the amphibians and reptiles of Mexico in Spanish and English were first published in 1994, with a revised and updated list published in 2008.

A set of guidelines for the creation of English names for birds was published in The Auk in 1978. It gave rise to Birds of the World: Recommended English Names and its Spanish and French companions.

The Academy of the Hebrew Language publish from time to time short dictionaries of common name in Hebrew for species that occur in Israel or surrounding countries e.g. for Reptilia in 1938, Osteichthyes in 2012, and Odonata in 2015.

== See also ==
- Folk taxonomy
- List of historical common names
- Scientific terminology
- Category:Plant common names
- Specific name (zoology)
