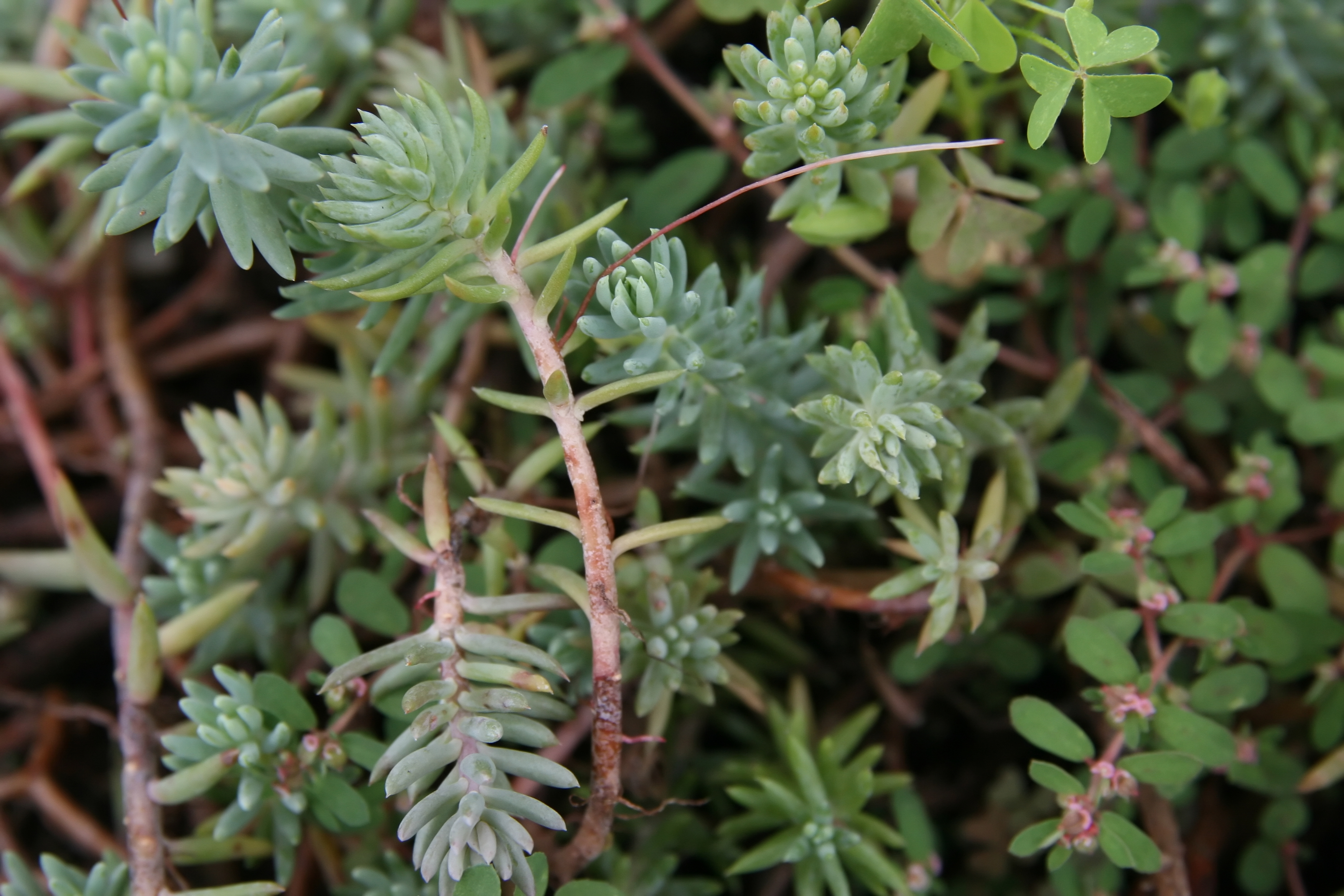
- Petrosedum reflexum

Scientific classification
- Kingdom: Plantae
- Clade: Tracheophytes
- Clade: Angiosperms
- Clade: Eudicots
- Order: Saxifragales
- Family: Crassulaceae
- Subfamily: Sempervivoideae
- Tribe: Semperviveae
- Genus: Petrosedum; Grulich

Type species
- Petrosedum reflexum (L.) Grulich

= Petrosedum =

Genus of flowering plants belonging to the stonecrop family

Petrosedum is a genus of flowering plants in the succulent family Crassulaceae (stonecrop family).

== Taxonomy ==
Petrosedum is a genus in the family Crassulaceae, subfamily Sempervivoideae, tribe Semperviveae, together with two other genera. It was segregated from the very large cosmopolitan and polyphyletic genus Sedum, where it was variously considered a series (Rupestria). It was originally described with eleven species.

=== Species ===
The following species are recognised in the genus Petrosedum:

- Petrosedum × affomarcoi (L.Gallo & Afferni) Afferni
- Petrosedum albescens Afferni
- Petrosedum amplexicaule (DC.) Velayos
- Petrosedum × bellardii L.Gallo
- Petrosedum × brevierei (Chass. ex L.Gallo) Afferni
- Petrosedum dianium (O.Bolòs) Afferni
- Petrosedum × elaverinum (L.Gallo & J.-M.Tison) L.Gallo
- Petrosedum erectum ('t Hart) Grulich
- Petrosedum × estrelae Gideon F.Sm. & R.Stephenson
- Petrosedum forsterianum (Sm.) Grulich
- Petrosedum × henkii (L.Gallo) Afferni
- Petrosedum × hommelsii ('t Hart) Niederle
- Petrosedum × lorenzoi (Niederle) Niederle
- Petrosedum × luteolum (Chaboiss.) Grulich
- Petrosedum montanum (Songeon & E.P.Perrier) Grulich
- Petrosedum monteferraticum Niederle
- Petrosedum ochroleucum (Chaix) Niederle
- Petrosedum orientale ('t Hart) Grulich
- Petrosedum × pascalianum (L.Gallo) Afferni
- Petrosedum pruinatum (Link ex Brot.) Grulich
- Petrosedum rupestre (L.) P.V.Heath
- Petrosedum sediforme (Jacq.) Grulich
- Petrosedum subulatum (C.A.Mey.) Afferni
- Petrosedum tenuifolium (Sm.) Grulich

== Bibliography ==
- Thiede, J; Eggli, U (2007). "Crassulaceae". In Kubitzki, Klaus (ed.). Berberidopsidales, Buxales, Crossosomatales, Fabales p.p., Geraniales, Gunnerales, Myrtales p.p., Proteales, Saxifragales, Vitales, Zygophyllales, Clusiaceae Alliance, Passifloraceae Alliance, Dilleniaceae, Huaceae, Picramniaceae, Sabiaceae. Springer. pp. 83–119. ISBN 978-3540322146. (full text at ResearchGate)
- Grulich, Vit (1984). "Generic division of Sedoideae in Europe and the adjacent regions" (PDF). Preslia. 56: 29–45.
