= Perch (surname) =

Perch pronounced Audio (US) is a surname.

== Origins ==
There is considerable confusion as to the origins of the surname, which has been recorded as Pearch, Pearche, Perch, Perche, Porch and possibly other variants. It was probably topographical or occupational, and as such would have described either somebody who possessed a perche of land (representing an area of land large enough to support a family), or who was a measurer of perches, a surveyor or land agent. However it is also possible that the name described a fisherman, one who professionally caught the freshwater fish known as the perch. Before the 14th century, large areas of England and particularly in East Anglia were permanently under water, and today's fens are what remains. There was in consequence a large inland fishing industry, that gradually died out over five hundred years. Another possibility is that the name is associated with the early textile industry, a perche being a frame used for drying cloth, whilst it was also a term used in stage coaches, but this was probably too late to influence the origin of the name.

A coat of arms associated with the name has the blazon of a red field charged with a fesses between three crosses, all silver. It is unclear when the surname was first recorded but surviving church registers of the city of London include Hugh Perche who married Elizabeth Chamberlen at St Margaret's, Westminster on April 23, 1559, and Margery Pearch who married Walter Hill at St Giles Cripplegate, on August 12, 1633.

== People ==
- Floyd Anthony Perch (b. 1959), Jamaican musician known as Papa Kojak.
- James Perch (b. 1985), English footballer.
- Rebecca De Mornay (real name Rebecca Pearch), American actress.
- Katharina Perch-Nielsen, Swiss orienteering competitor.

== See also ==
- Perch (disambiguation)
- Perch
