= Park Avenue Tunnel (roadway) =

Tunnel in Manhattan, New York

Park Avenue Tunnel (Murray Hill Tunnel)
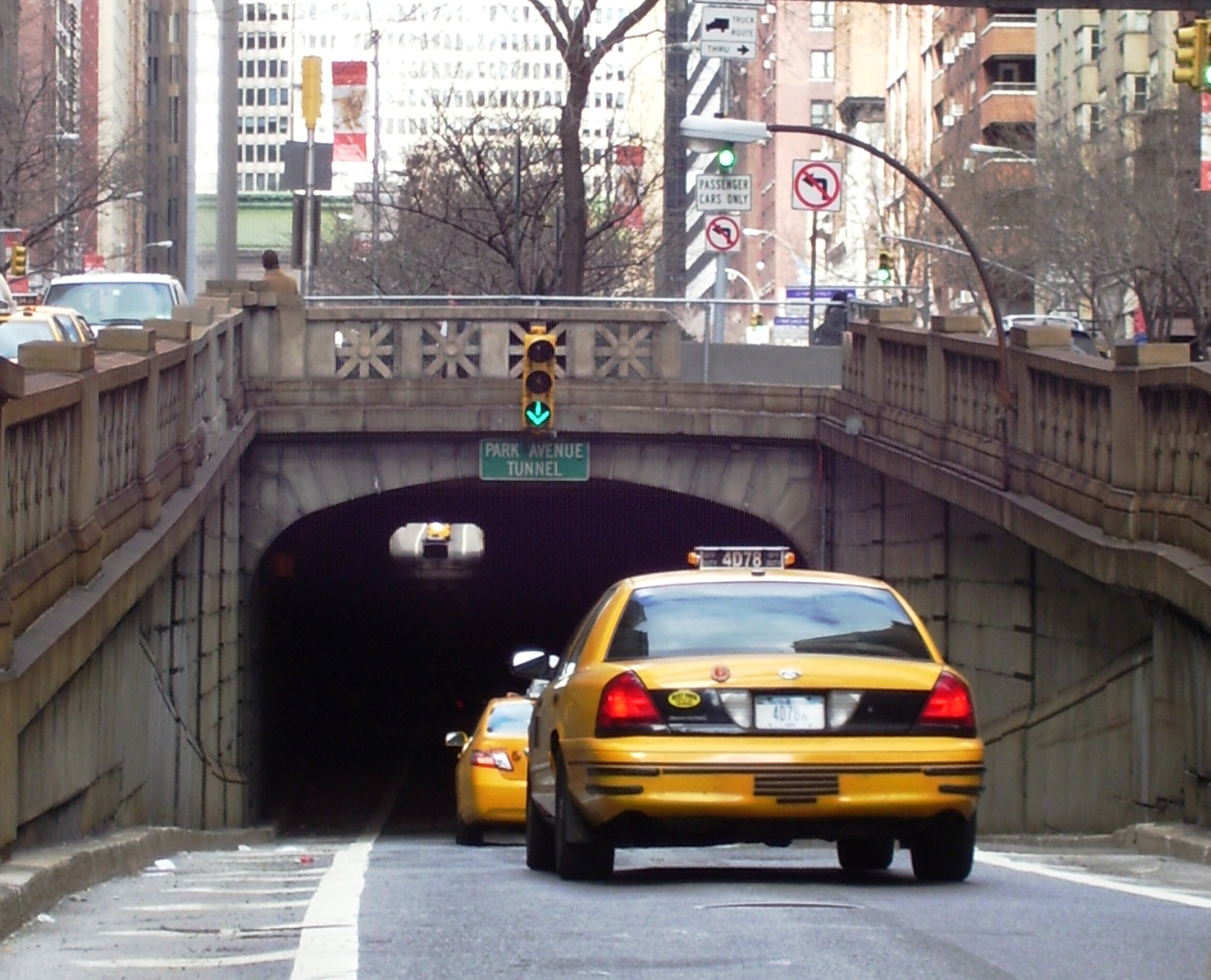
- A taxi heading north into the tunnel in 2011
- Interactive map of Park Avenue Tunnel (Murray Hill Tunnel)

Overview
- Location: Manhattan, New York
- Coordinates: 40°44′56″N 73°58′48″W
- Route: Northbound Park Avenue
- Start: 33rd Street (entrance ramp); 34th Street (entrance portal)
- End: 40th Street (exit ramp); 39th Street (exit portal) (all traffic must continue to 46th Street)

Operation
- Opened: 1834; 192 years ago
- Owner: New York City
- Operator: New York City Department of Transportation
- Traffic: Cars (formerly trains and street cars)

Technical
- Length: 5 blocks, approximately 0.25 miles (0.40 km)
- No. of lanes: 1
- Operating speed: 35 mph (56.33 km/h)
- Tunnel clearance: 8 feet 11 inches (2.72 m)
- Width: 16 feet (4.88 m)

The Park Avenue Tunnel, also called the Murray Hill Tunnel, is a 1,600-foot-long (488 m) tunnel that passes under seven blocks of Park Avenue in Murray Hill, in the New York City borough of Manhattan. Traffic used to travel northbound from 33rd Street toward the Park Avenue Viaduct. The tunnel is under the jurisdiction of the New York City Department of Transportation. It is designed to carry one lane of northbound car traffic from 33rd to 40th streets. From 40th Street north, traffic must follow the Park Avenue Viaduct around Grand Central Terminal to 46th Street. The vertical clearance is 8 ft 11 in (2.72 m).

The IRT Lexington Avenue Line of the New York City Subway, carrying the 4, 5, 6, and <6> trains, runs parallel to the Park Avenue Tunnel in two tunnels below it.

== History ==
The tunnel once carried the New York and Harlem Railroad and later, that company's streetcar line. It was then called the Murray Hill Tunnel. The tunnel was originally built as an open rock cut, completed in 1834, after which the NY&H Railroad was opened as far as Yorkville, to 85th Street. The first trains to use the cut were horse-drawn. It carried steam trains from the beginning of the New York & Harlem steam service in 1837 until steam locomotives were prohibited south of 42nd St in 1858.

In 1850, the cut was roofed over using granite stringers from the original railroad bed south of 14th Street, creating the present tunnel. In 1870 an underground station for local horse-drawn streetcar service was added at 38th Street along with stations at the portals at 34th Street and 40th Street. After the completion of Grand Central Depot in 1871 the tunnel was used exclusively by local streetcars. The streetcar line was electrified with underground conduit power in 1898.

In 1913, there was a plan to move the southern portal of the Park Avenue Tunnel one block north. This would have been accomplished by lowering 34th Street to the height of the existing tunnel. Lloyd Collis of the Fourth Avenue Improvement Association said the plan would have minimal impact on surrounding buildings, such as the then-new Vanderbilt Hotel, and would allow passengers at the 33rd Street station to cross Park Avenue without having to detour to 32nd or 34th Street. Several prominent businessmen and property owners including J. P. Morgan Jr. and Charles D. Wetmore opposed the plan.

Some residents alleged the plan would damage nearby properties, while others objected that a flattened 34th Street would allow the construction of a moving walkway, "ruining" the residential character of the neighborhood. The plans would have allowed a subway line to be built under 34th Street as well, though the Public Service Commission canceled a planned subway line under 34th Street in May 1913. Mayor William Jay Gaynor vetoed the portal proposal the next month.

In 1919 the ramp to the Park Avenue Viaduct around Grand Central Terminal was built directly above the northern streetcar ramp, which sloped upward from a portal north of 40th St to street level at 42nd St. In 1935, streetcar service was discontinued and the tunnel was converted for roadway use. At that time the north end was reconstructed with a steeper approach, reaching street level south of 40th St and allowing continuous car travel from the tunnel onto the viaduct. The tunnel reopened as a roadway in 1937. Prior to August 3, 2008, the tunnel carried two-way traffic, one lane for each direction; on that date, it was made northbound-only to increase safety for pedestrians crossing Park Avenue at 33rd Street.

In February 2017, the Park Avenue Tunnel was closed for a $24 million rehabilitation. It was scheduled to reopen in 2019 but remained closed until November 2023.

== Art installations ==
In 2013, the tunnel was open to pedestrians for the first time in coordination with the annual Summer Streets event, which shuts down part of Park Avenue to vehicular traffic between 7 am and 1 pm for three Sundays every August. During the August 2013 event, the interior served as an art space containing Rafael Lozano-Hemmer's Voice Tunnel installation, in which visitors could record a short message that would be played back continuously from speakers along the tunnel walls. In the 2014 Summer Streets, the tunnel temporarily reopened to pedestrians, this time featuring DIVE, an installation by Jana Winderen that incorporates aquatic soundscapes. Both art projects were commissioned by the New York City Department of Transportation.

== In popular culture ==
Parts of the 1998 movie Godzilla were filmed in the tunnel. Toward the end of the film, Godzilla chases the film's main characters into the tunnel, but is later lured back into the open toward the Brooklyn Bridge.

== Gallery ==
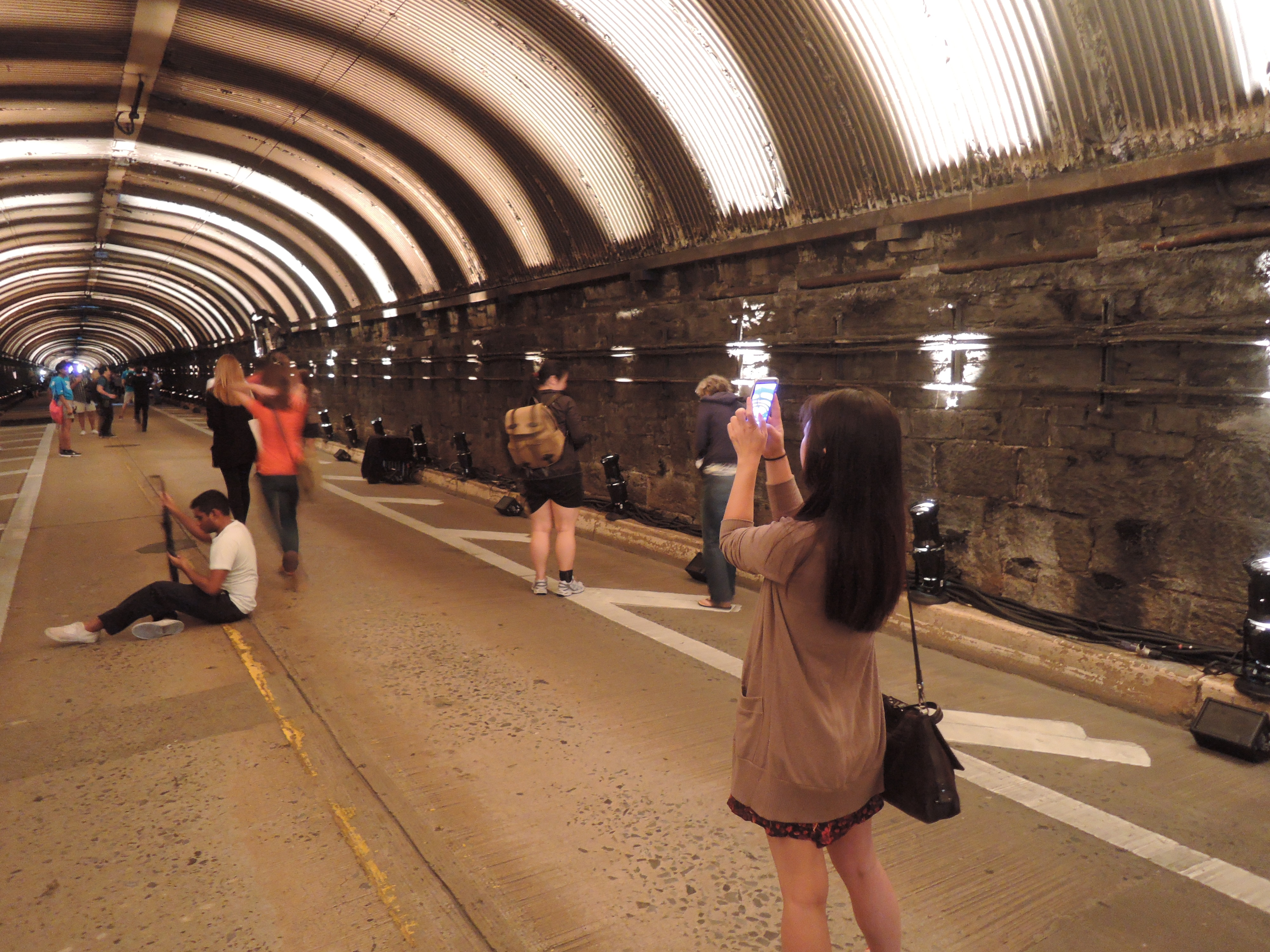
Interior with Voice Tunnel art installation (2013)

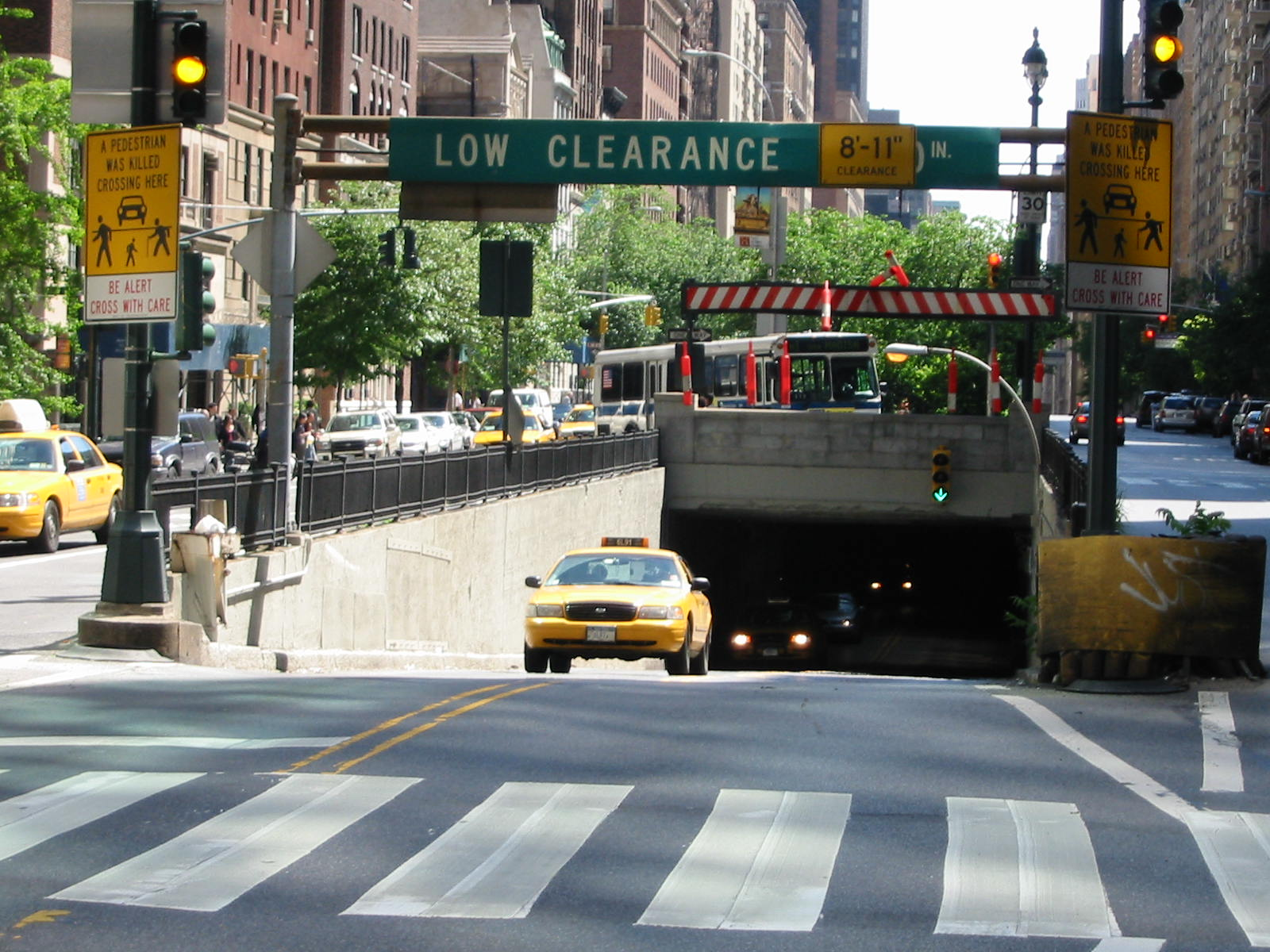
North end, before the tunnel was converted to one-way northbound
