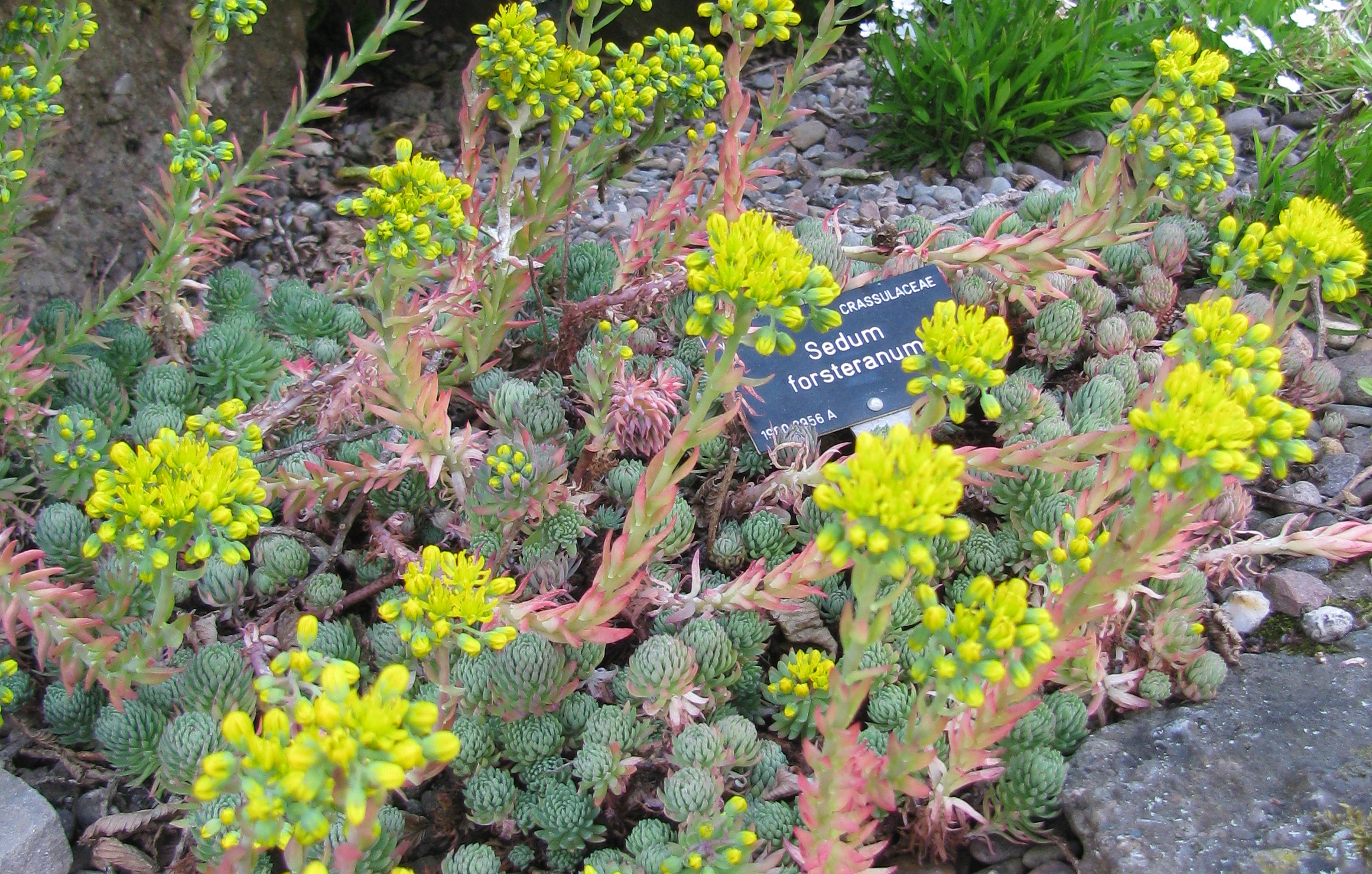

Scientific classification
- Kingdom: Plantae
- Clade: Tracheophytes
- Clade: Angiosperms
- Clade: Eudicots
- Order: Saxifragales
- Family: Crassulaceae
- Genus: Petrosedum
- Species: P. forsterianum

Binomial name
- Petrosedum forsterianum (Smith) Grulich

= Petrosedum forsterianum =

Rock stonecrop

Species of flowering plant in the stonecrop family

Petrosedum forsterianum, the rock stonecrop or Welsh stonecrop, is a species of flowering plant in the family Crassulaceae. It is a mat-forming, evergreen stonecrop native to northwestern and southwestern Europe and northern Africa. It may be grown as an ornamental plant or consumed.

== Distribution ==
The natural range of Petrosedum forsterianum includes England, Wales, Ireland, France, Germany, Spain, and Portugal (including the Azores), as well as Morocco. It thrives in rocky habitats, forming dense, low-growing mats. It is often found in the shaded edges of glades. It is common in the shade of shrubs, which initially serve as nurse plants and then provide partial shade for mature specimens.

== Taxonomy ==
Petrosedum forsterianum was originally described as Sedum forsterianum and formerly considered a subspecies of Sedum rupestre (nowadays Petrosedum rupestre). P. rupestre and P. forsterianum are still frequently confused. The specific epithet honors Edward Forster the Younger.

Over time, different names have been used to describe various forms of Petrosedum forsterianum, but Henk 't Hart (1978) observed that these forms exist along a continuous gradient rather than as clearly defined categories. Louis-Paul Hébert recorded that all octoploid types occur north of the Pyrenees. A naturally occurring hybrid between Petrosedum sediforme and P. forsterianum was discovered in Portugal and described in 2015 as Petrosedum × estrelae.

== Description ==
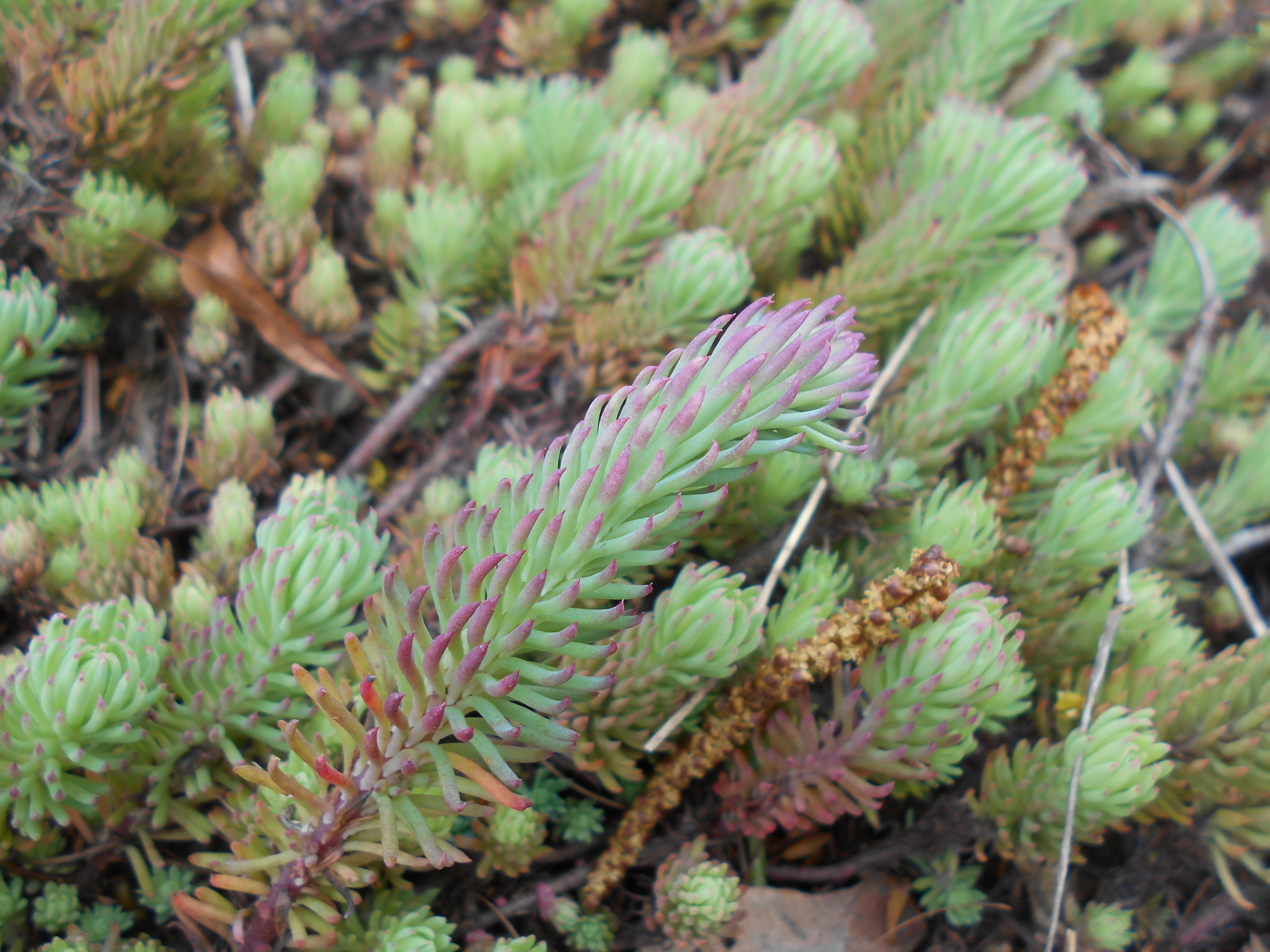
P. forsterianum has creeping shoots, like these, and upright flowering shoots.

Petrosedum forsterianum has two types of shoots: creeping, non-flowering ones that take root as they spread, and upright, flowering stems. The non-flowering shoots have tightly packed, scale-like leaves clustered at their tips, giving them a cone-like appearance. These leaves are linear in shape, slightly rounded or somewhat flattened, with a small spur at the base. They are typically green or bluish-green, measuring 10–15 mm, and remain on the plant even after dying, turning brown over time. The British population is distinguished by a compact and slow-growing rather than creeping habit, whereas the North African plants have distinctly bluish-purple foliage. The species is evergreen.

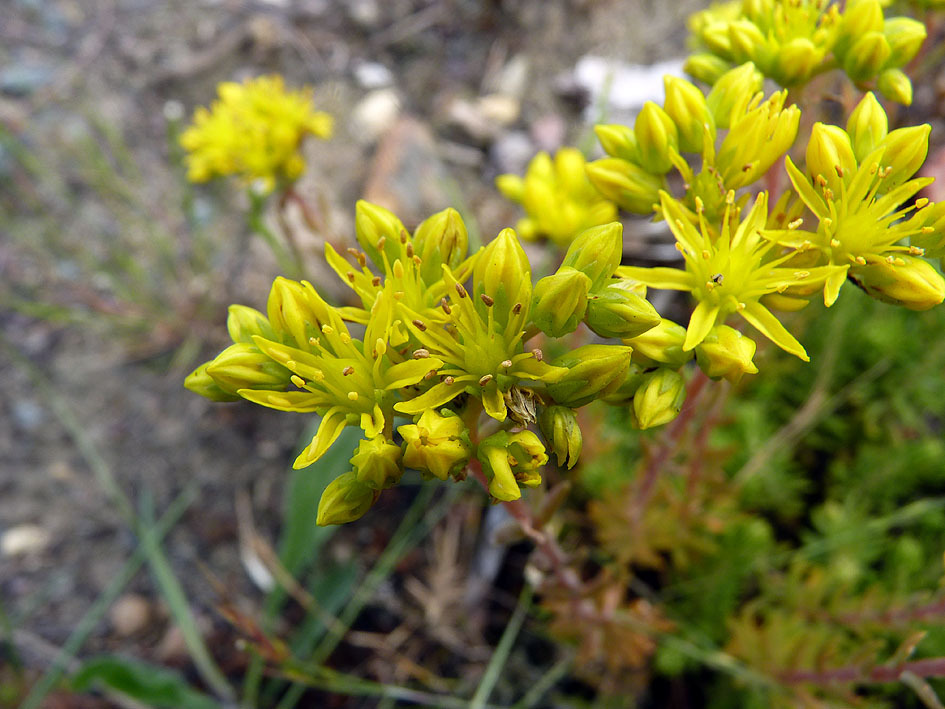
The flowers of P. forsterianum are arranged in clusters.

When in bloom, the flowering stems of Petrosedum forsterianum stand upright, reaching 10–40 cm (4–16 in). The flowers are arranged in branching clusters (corymbs), with each branch curving downward while in bud before straightening as they open. The flowers usually have five to seven, sometimes up to nine, bright yellow petals that spread outward. The sepals, small leaf-like structures at the flower's base, are triangular with a pointed tip and grow up to 3 mm long. The stamens, which produce pollen, are also yellow. The peak of the flowering season is in early summer. The plant produces upright seed capsules that are pale brown with distinct ridges.

Petrosedum forsterianum has a variable chromosome count (2n = 24, 48, 60, 72, or 96). A cristate form may be produced, but is much rarer than in P. rupestre.

== Use ==
Petrosedum forsterianum is edible. It can be added to salads and soups. It may also be used in green roofs. This plant adapts well to a range of soils as long as good drainage is provided, performing best in dry to moderately moist conditions with plenty of sunlight. It can handle partial shade and withstands both heat and humidity. It favors sandy or gravelly soil with minimal fertility. Over time, it will naturally expand in the garden.

Apart from the British and diploid North African populations, this species spreads too aggressively for a typical rock garden. It works well as ground cover, particularly when contained, such as in a pot. Although it self-seeds easily in other settings, it remains manageable. The British form is less aggressive, but it also produces fewer flowers and is less vibrant in color. During hot, dry summers with intense sunlight, P. forsterianum often withers and may break apart. If this happens, its tightly clustered rosettes can reestablish themselves once moisture returns. While fully hardy across temperate climates, it prefers shadier, wetter conditions than its close relatives. Pests and diseases do not normally affect it, but slugs, snails, and scale insects may attack.
