= Porches =

Porches may refer to:

- Porch, an architectural element
- Porches (Lagoa), a civil parish (freguesia) in the municipality of Lagoa, Algarve, Portugal
- Porches Pottery (Olaria Algarve), producer of hand-painted pottery
- Porches (band), an American synthpop project of New York-based musician Aaron Maine

== See also ==
- Porch (disambiguation)
