= Park Avenue Viaduct =

Roadway in Manhattan, New York

- U.S. National Register of Historic Places
- New York State Register of Historic Places
- New York City Landmark
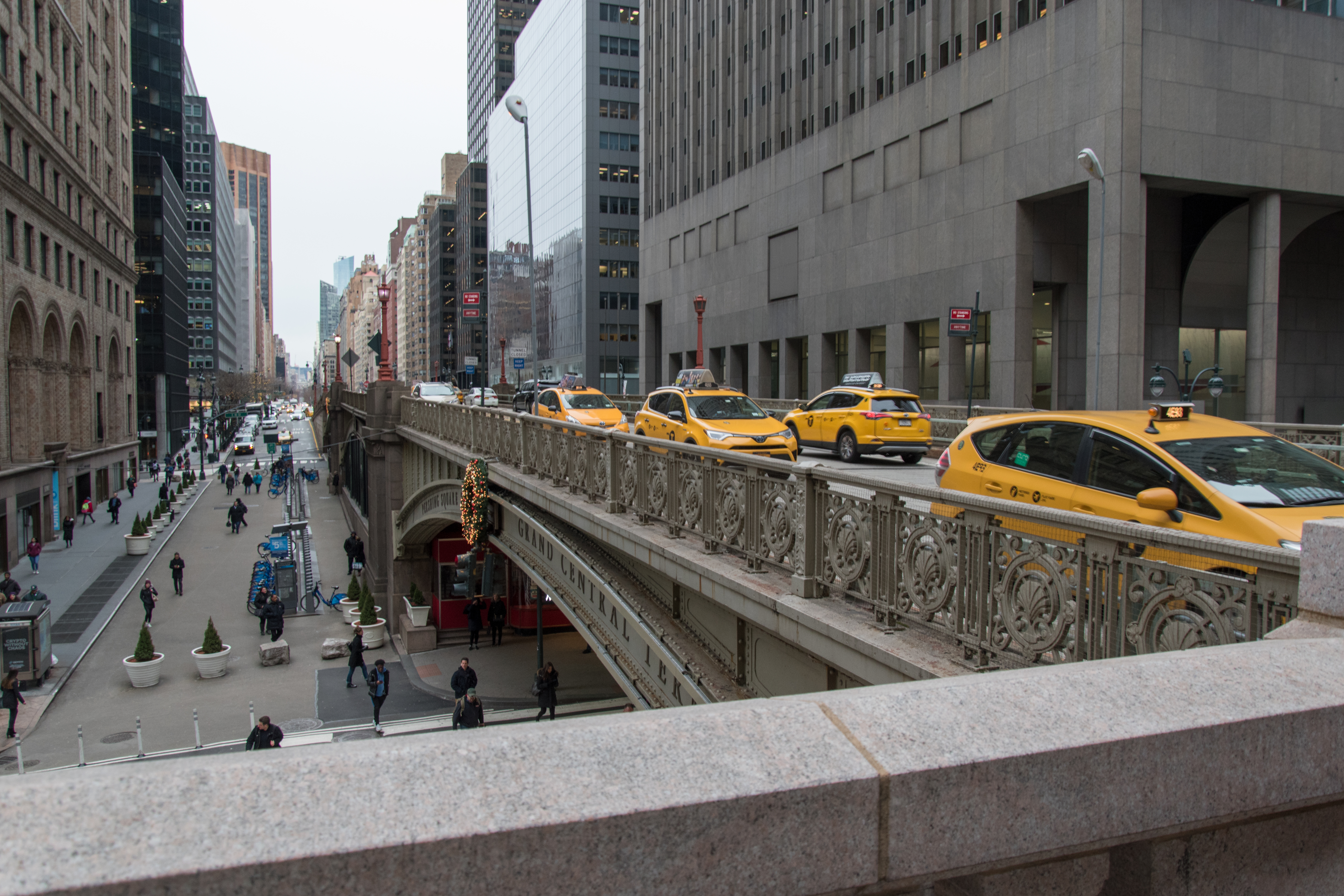
- A portion of the viaduct crosses 42nd Street at Grand Central Terminal.
- Location: Park Avenue between East 40th and 46th Streets; Manhattan, New York
- Coordinates: 40°45′07″N 73°58′40″W
- Built: 1919 (western roadway and south leg); 1928 (eastern roadway)
- Architect: Warren & Wetmore; Reed & Stem
- Architectural style: Beaux-Arts
- NRHP reference No.: 83001726
- NYSRHP No.: 06101.006478
- NYCL No.: 1127

Significant dates
- Added to NRHP: August 11, 1983
- Designated NYSRHP: July 6, 1983
- Designated NYCL: September 23, 1980

The Park Avenue Viaduct, also known as the Pershing Square Viaduct, is a roadway in Manhattan, New York City. It carries vehicular traffic on Park Avenue from 40th to 46th Streets. The viaduct is composed of two sections: a steel viaduct with two roadways from 40th to 42nd Streets, as well as a pair of roadways between 42nd and 46th Streets. The section from 40th to 42nd Streets was designated a New York City landmark in 1980 and was listed on the National Register of Historic Places in 1983. The street-level service roads of Park Avenue, which flank the viaduct between 40th and 42nd Streets, are called Pershing Square. The section of the viaduct between 42nd and 46th Streets travels around Grand Central Terminal and the MetLife Building, then through the Helmsley Building; all three buildings lie across the north–south axis of the avenue.

The viaduct was first proposed by New York Central Railroad engineer William J. Wilgus in 1900 as part of the construction of Grand Central Terminal. Construction on the viaduct's western leg began in 1917, after the terminal had opened, and was completed in 1919. The western leg initially carried two-way traffic, so the eastern leg was completed for northbound traffic in 1928, and the western leg was reconfigured to carry southbound traffic only. An information booth was established in 1939 beneath the viaduct, and the city renovated the viaduct in the early 1990s.

== Description ==
The viaduct is used by automobile traffic between 40th Street to the south and 46th Street to the north. It is composed of two sections: the steel viaduct between 40th and 42nd Streets, and the pair of roadways between 42nd and 46th Streets. Immediately to the south of 40th Street is the portal of the Park Avenue Tunnel, which carries northbound traffic from 33rd Street directly onto the viaduct. The posted weight limit for the viaduct is 15 short tons (13 long tons; 14 t), and commercial traffic is prohibited. Pedestrian and bicycle traffic is generally also prohibited, except during "Summer Streets", when Park Avenue is closed to vehicular traffic on selected summer weekends.

=== Route ===
==== Southern section ====
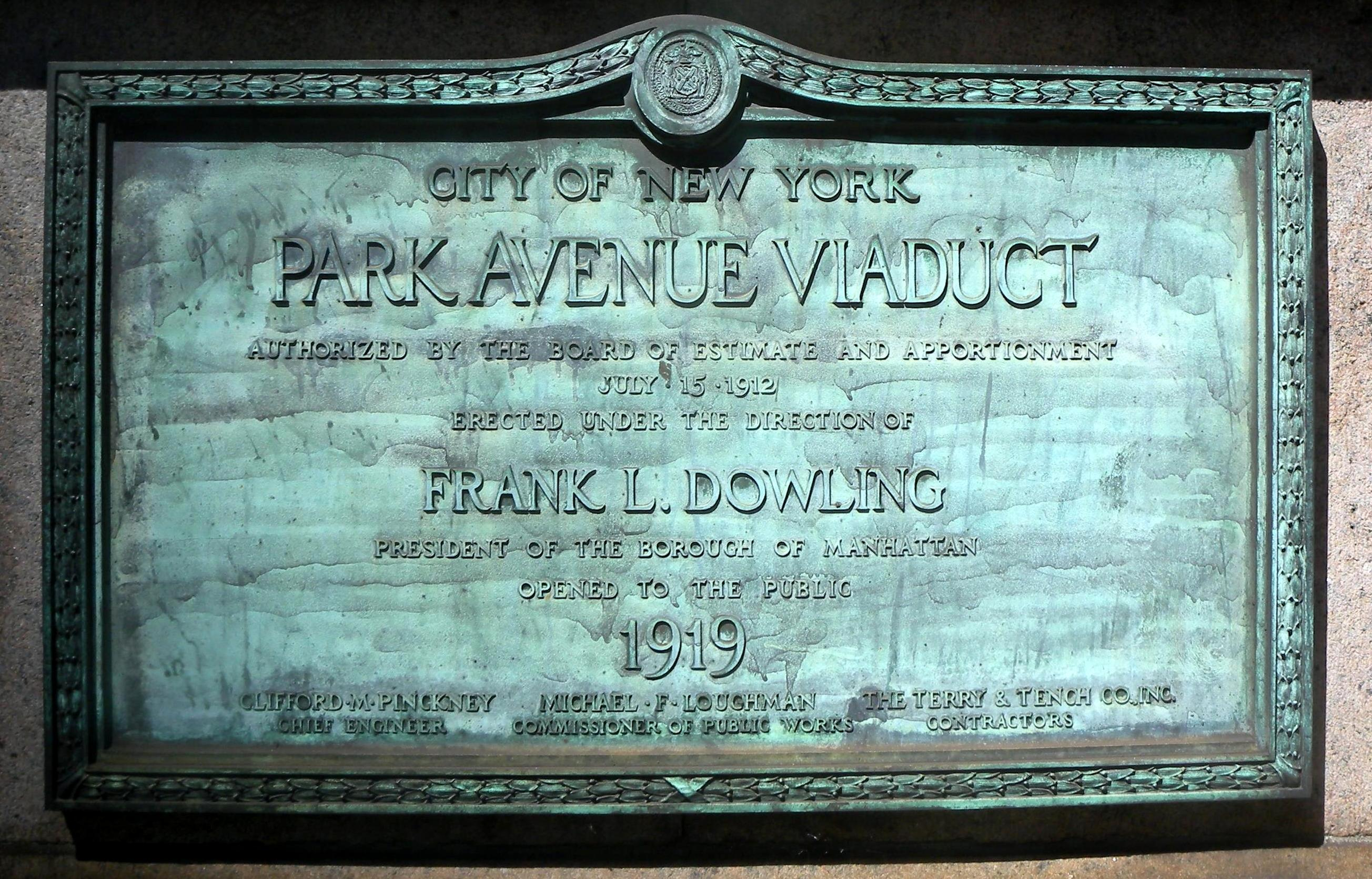
Plaque on the viaduct

From the south, traffic from Park Avenue, 40th Street, or the Park Avenue Tunnel enters the steel viaduct. The viaduct rises to a T-intersection just north of 42nd Street, over the street-level entrance to Grand Central Terminal below. This segment of the viaduct is 600 feet (180 m) long and consists of a granite approach ramp with stone balustrades, as well as three steel arches, which are separated by granite piers with foliate friezes. The central arch has been infilled to create a restaurant space. The arches were included because of "aesthetic considerations", but are actually cantilever beams, because true arches would have required excessively large abutments. The girders over each pier are each 136 feet (41 m) long by 12 feet (3.7 m) deep, weighing 73 short tons (65 long tons; 66 t) each. They were made in New Jersey and shipped from Delaware to New York, then pulled by 52 horses from the East River.

The deck of the viaduct, above the steel arches, contains railings with plain and foliate panels, as well as lampposts atop each granite pier. The deck is 60 feet (18 m) wide. The arches of the Pershing Square Viaduct are based on the Pont Alexandre III in Paris, and contain plaques with the words "Pershing Square" at their centers.

==== Northern section ====
At the T-intersection north of 42nd Street, the viaduct splits into two legs. A statue of Cornelius Vanderbilt, longtime owner of New York Central, is at the T-intersection. The legs of the viaduct surround the terminal building and the MetLife Building to the north before passing through a pair of portals under the Helmsley Building between 45th and 46th Streets. Northbound traffic uses the eastern leg, which runs above a private road called Depew Place, while southbound traffic uses the western leg, which runs above the eastern sidewalk of Vanderbilt Avenue. Both roadways pass above 45th Street without intersection. The roadways then take sharp S-curves into the Helmsley Building, where they descend into triple-story arches that exit onto 46th Street.

The western leg is 35 feet (11 m) wide; the eastern leg is 33 feet (10 m) wide between 42nd and 44th Streets, widening to 53 feet (16 m) north of 44th Street. The roadway above 42nd Street, which connects the two legs, is 40 feet (12 m) wide. The portion of the viaduct immediately surrounding the terminal's building has a masonry balustrade with an additional metal guardrail. There is a cast-iron eagle atop the balustrade where the western leg curves onto the connecting roadway above 42nd Street. A sidewalk, accessible from the Grand Hyatt hotel, runs along the section of the viaduct that is parallel to 42nd Street.

=== Pershing Square ===
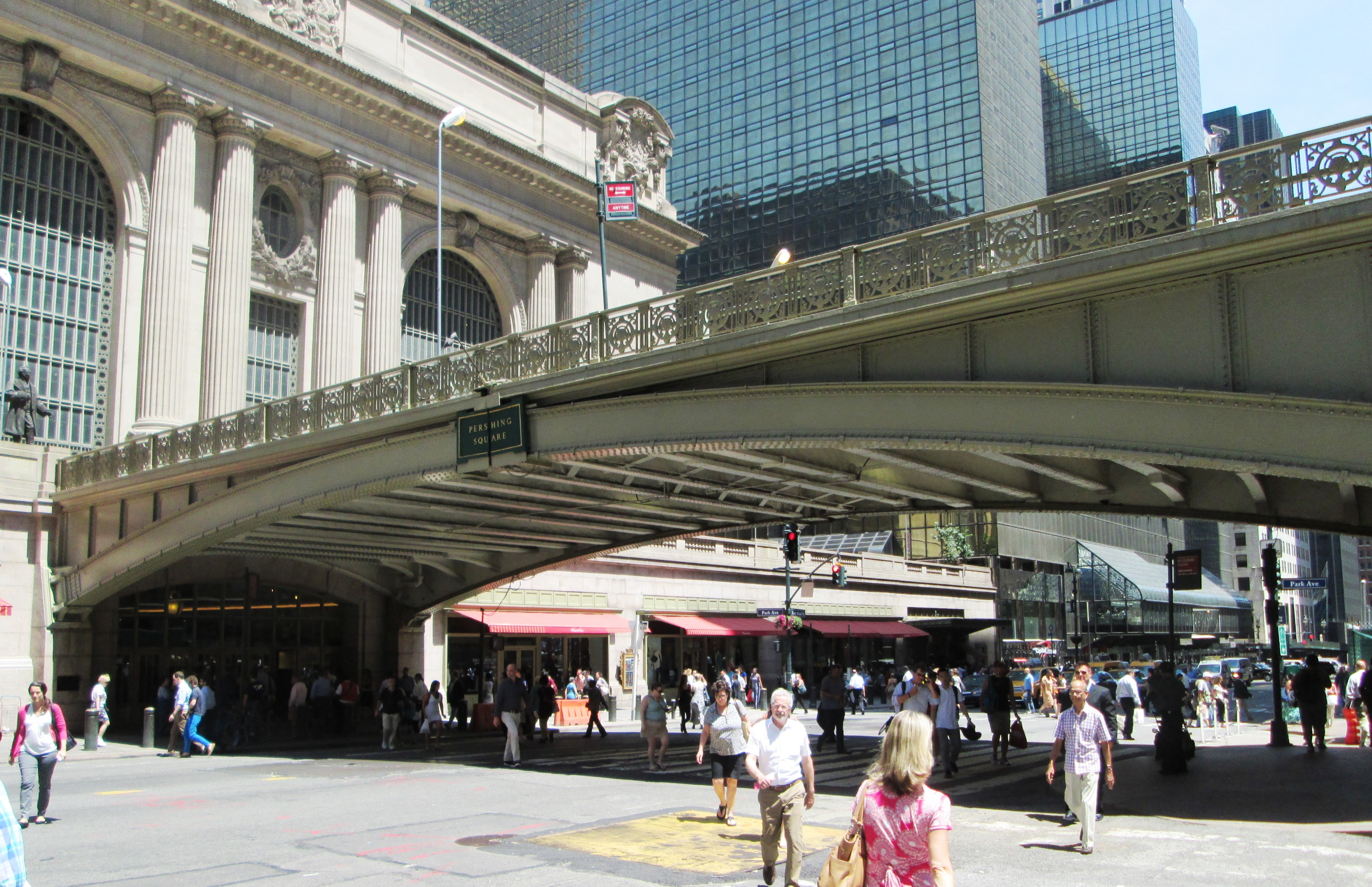
The viaduct crosses over Pershing Square

The street-level service roads of Park Avenue between 40th and 42nd Streets are called Pershing Square. The service roads between 41st and 42nd Streets are open only to bicycles and pedestrians. The square is named after General John J. Pershing. Consequently, the southern portion of the viaduct between 40th and 42nd Streets is also known as the Pershing Square Viaduct.

== History ==
The New York Central Railroad built the Grand Central Depot in 1869 as the southern terminus of the Park Avenue main line. The depot was located along the axis of Fourth Avenue (later Park Avenue), splitting the avenue into two parts: a section south of 42nd Street and another north of 45th Street. The southern section of Park Avenue was a quiet road running through the upscale enclave of Murray Hill, while the northern section contained an open cut (later covered over), which carried the Park Avenue main line. Further, the northern end of the Park Avenue Tunnel rose to ground level between 40th and 42nd Streets, splitting 41st Street into two sections at Park Avenue. Depew Place ran along the eastern side of the depot, while Vanderbilt Avenue ran along the western side.

=== Early plans ===
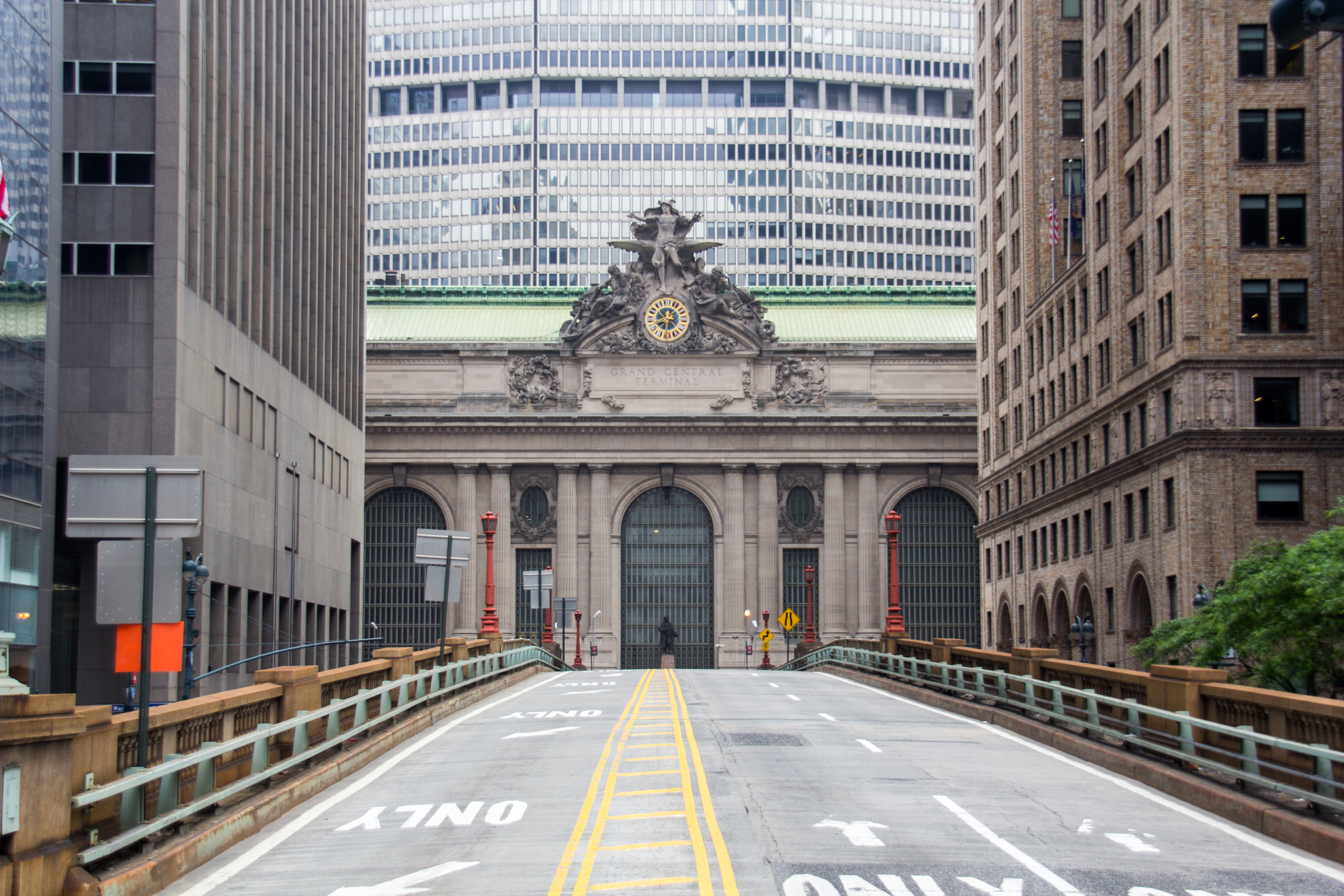
Grand Central Terminal as seen from the southern end of the viaduct

The Park Avenue Viaduct was first proposed by New York Central president William J. Wilgus in 1900, when he suggested replacing Grand Central Depot with Grand Central Terminal. During a design competition for the terminal in 1903, Reed and Stem proposed vehicular viaducts around the terminal building. New York Central ultimately selected Reed and Stem, as well as Warren and Wetmore, to construct Grand Central Terminal. The two architectural firms had a tense relationship. Over Wilgus's objections, Warren and Wetmore modified Reed and Stem's plan, eliminating a proposed 12-story tower and vehicular viaducts. The elevated viaducts were restored, as were several of Reed and Stem's other design elements, as part of an agreement between the two firms in 1909. The railroad also bought Depew Place, over which the eastern leg of the viaduct would run. Two years later, the New York City Board of Estimate approved New York Central's plans for a viaduct carrying Park Avenue over 42nd Street.

The present plans for the Park Avenue Viaduct were devised in 1912 by Warren and Wetmore. The terminal's construction already provided for roadways to either side of the terminal building, in preparation for the viaduct's eventual completion. The terminal was opened in 1913, but the viaduct could not be built yet because the Interborough Rapid Transit Company, one of the operators of the city's subway system, had not even decided whether to build the Grand Central–42nd Street station under the viaduct's site. The IRT ultimately decided to build the station diagonally under 42nd Street, connecting its new Lexington Avenue Line to the north with the existing subway under Park Avenue to the south, and by mid-1917, subway construction had progressed to the extent that work on the viaduct could commence. Bidding for the viaduct's construction was opened in August 1917. At that time, Fifth Avenue and Madison Avenue (which ran parallel to Park Avenue) were heavily congested, and the viaduct was expected to alleviate some of that traffic.

=== Construction ===
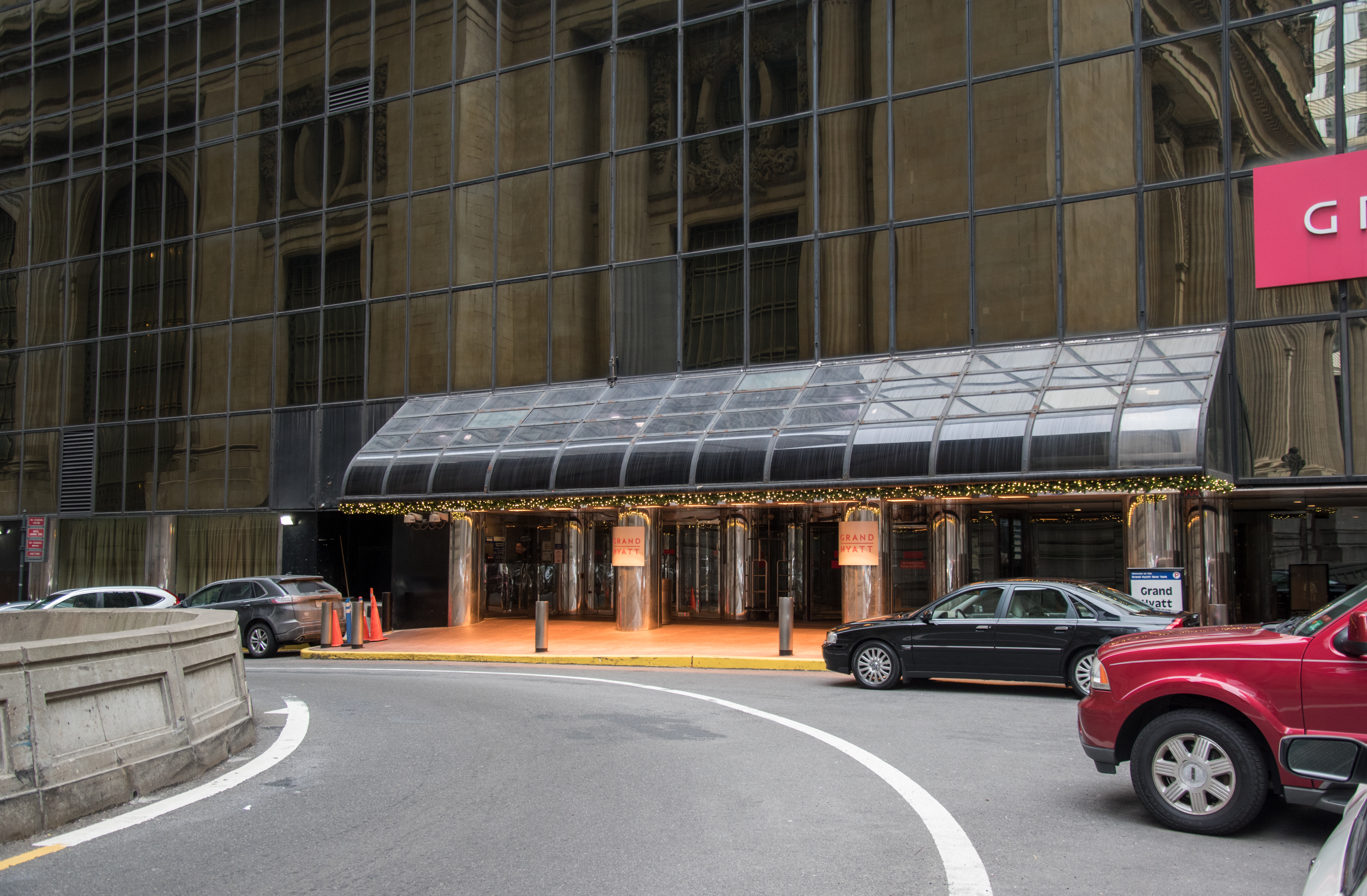
Taxi stand on the viaduct, outside the Grand Hyatt hotel

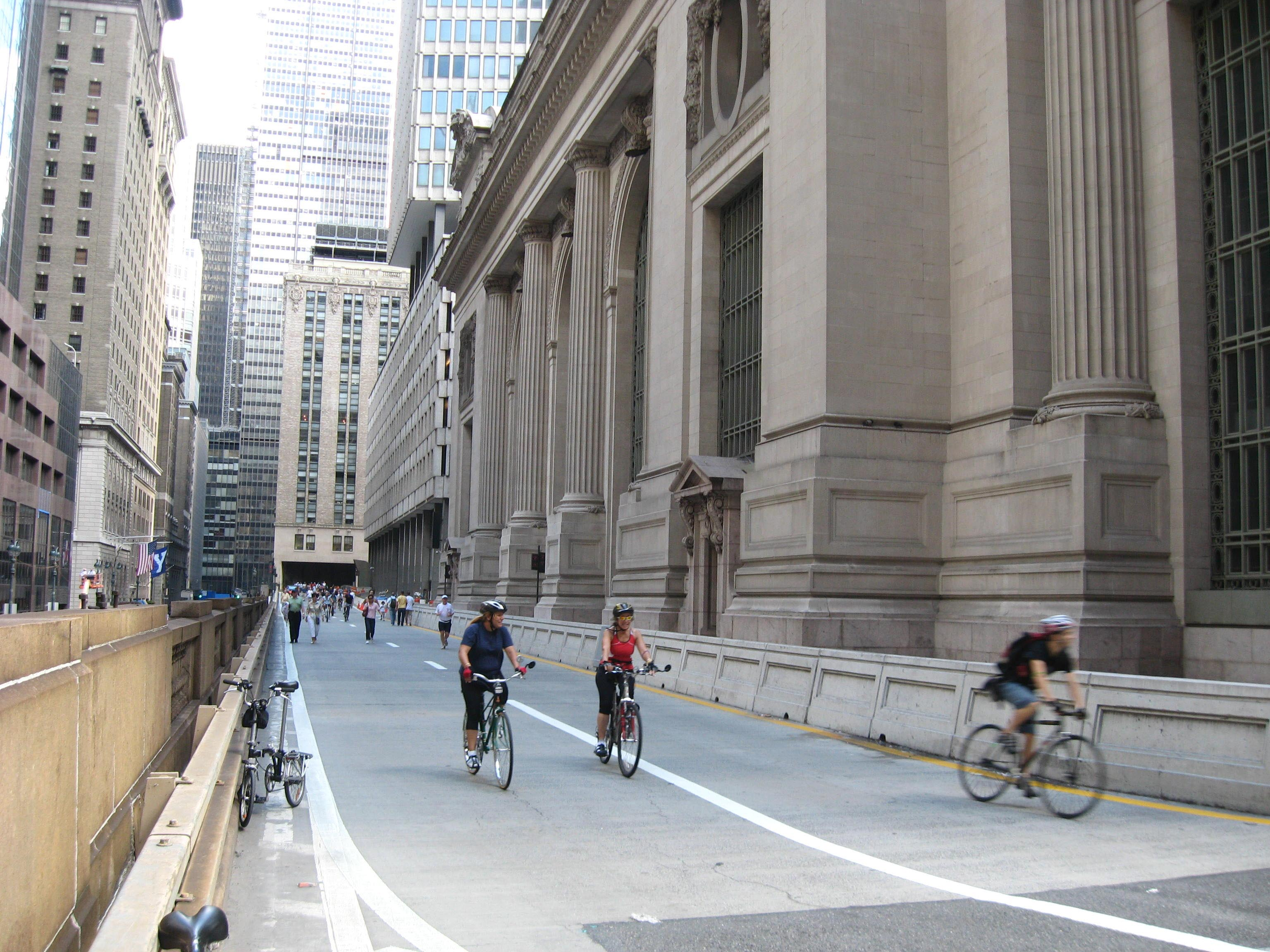
The western leg of the viaduct during "Summer Streets", temporarily closed to cars

Construction on the viaduct began in November 1917. However, further progress was hindered due to the difficulty in securing ornamental steel during World War I. Work resumed in July 1918 when an order for the necessary steel was placed, and builders began erecting the masonry foundation and wall. The viaduct opened on April 16, 1919; the project had cost $768,032, including related infrastructure projects, such as the opening of 41st Street and the relocation of both of the Park Avenue Tunnel's portals. When it opened, only automobiles and taxicabs used the Park Avenue Viaduct. The original viaduct took two-way traffic from Park Avenue at 40th Street and carried it around the west side of Grand Central Terminal, terminating at the T-intersection of 45th Street and Vanderbilt Avenue. (Note: Vanderbilt Avenue continued as a private roadway north of 45th Street; it was opened to the public when the viaduct was extended in 1928.) An elevated service driveway ran to the east of the terminal, above Depew Place; it was used by baggage and mail vans, and provided parking space and an entrance to the Commodore Hotel. The driveway served the Grand Central post office at 450 Lexington Avenue, as well as a since-demolished baggage building north of the terminal.

Shortly after the viaduct's opening, the area at the bottom of the viaduct was renamed Pershing Square in 1919 to honor World War I General John J. Pershing. The lot immediately to the east had been occupied by Grand Union Hotel, which was condemned via eminent domain in 1914 and subsequently demolished. That space was proposed for use as an open plaza with a three-story memorial called "Victory Hall". In July 1920, a realty consortium headed by investor Henry Mandel bought the site. Mandel gave the Bowery Savings Bank the eastern portion of the site, which would be developed into an office building at 110 East 42nd Street, completed in 1923. The western portion of the site became the Pershing Square Building, also completed in 1923. The "Pershing Square" name subsequently applied to the service roads of the Park Avenue Viaduct between 40th and 42nd Streets.

=== Expansion ===
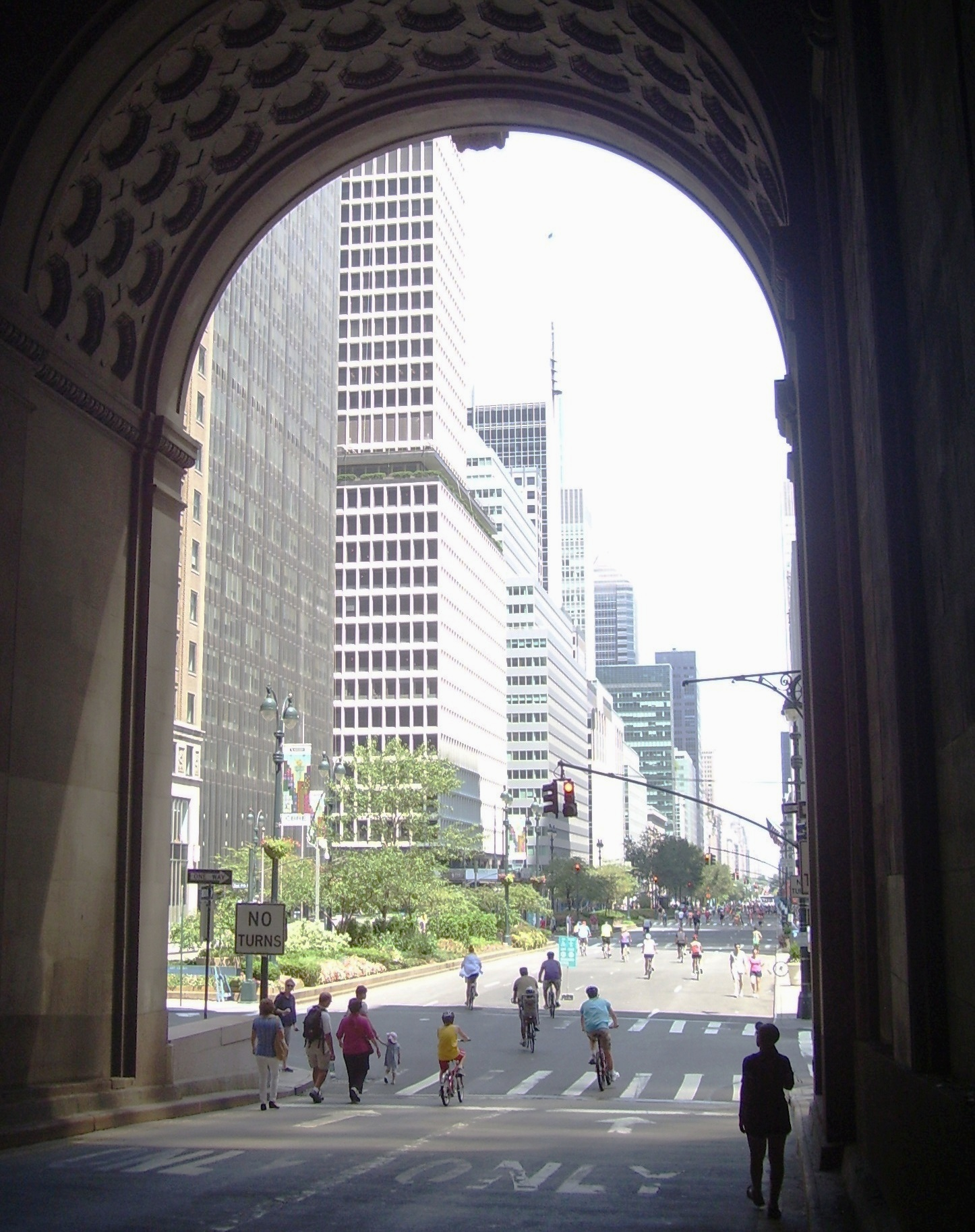
The exit of the eastern leg of the viaduct through the Helmsley Building back to ground level

Soon after the viaduct's opening, traffic at 45th Street and Vanderbilt Avenue started to accumulate, causing gridlock at that intersection, since thirteen lanes of traffic converged there. By 1920, business associations were advocating for the eastern leg of the viaduct to be opened to public use. The city started negotiating with New York Central to open the eastern leg of the viaduct, although the railroad was holding out unless it was granted property on Park Avenue. The city proposed building a ramp from the viaduct that would descend to ground level at 46th Street, while keeping Park Avenue open to traffic between 45th and 46th Streets; however, New York Central's proposal would altogether close off that block of Park Avenue. The Manhattan borough president, Julius Miller, proposed giving New York Central the right to erect a building over Park Avenue, in exchange for the railroad giving Depew Place back to the city so that the eastern leg of the viaduct could be built. By November 1922, Miller and the New York Central reached an agreement to submit a proposal for the viaduct to city authorities, and the Board of Estimate approved the proposal in January 1923.

New York Central had made a revised agreement by the city by 1924, which gave the railroad the right to erect a building over Park Avenue. As part of the project, the section of Park Avenue between 45th and 46th Streets would be closed, the eastern leg of the viaduct would be completed, and traffic would be carried around both sides of the terminal and through the New York Central Building before being deposited at Park Avenue and 46th Street. The plans also called for a roadway running above 45th Street's southern sidewalk, connecting the two directions of traffic, as well as the extension of Vanderbilt Avenue north to 47th Street and the widening of Park Avenue. Initial plans called for the viaduct to run across 46th Street so that viaduct traffic did not interfere with traffic on 45th and 46th Streets. This was later changed to allow the viaduct's roadways to descend to street level between 45th and 46th Streets. The roadways were placed on S-curves supported by stanchions that did not touch the New York Central Building's frame.

In April 1924, the revised plan was sent to the Board of Estimate, which approved the project. Work could start upon the approval of Charles L. Craig, the city controller. However, Craig initially refused to certify the plan, stating that the city had paid much more for Depew Place than the land was worth. After more than a year of re-negotiations, Craig finally certified the plan in December 1925. The next year, work on the New York Central Building's foundations commenced, and the block of Park Avenue between 45th and 46th Streets was closed. The eastern leg along Depew Place was opened in February 1928, and northbound traffic was diverted there. Construction was complete by September of that year, with the completion of the western leg, which had been extended to Park Avenue and 46th Street with an overpass over 45th Street. In November 1928, the Vanderbilt statue was installed at the T-intersection above 42nd Street.

=== Later history ===
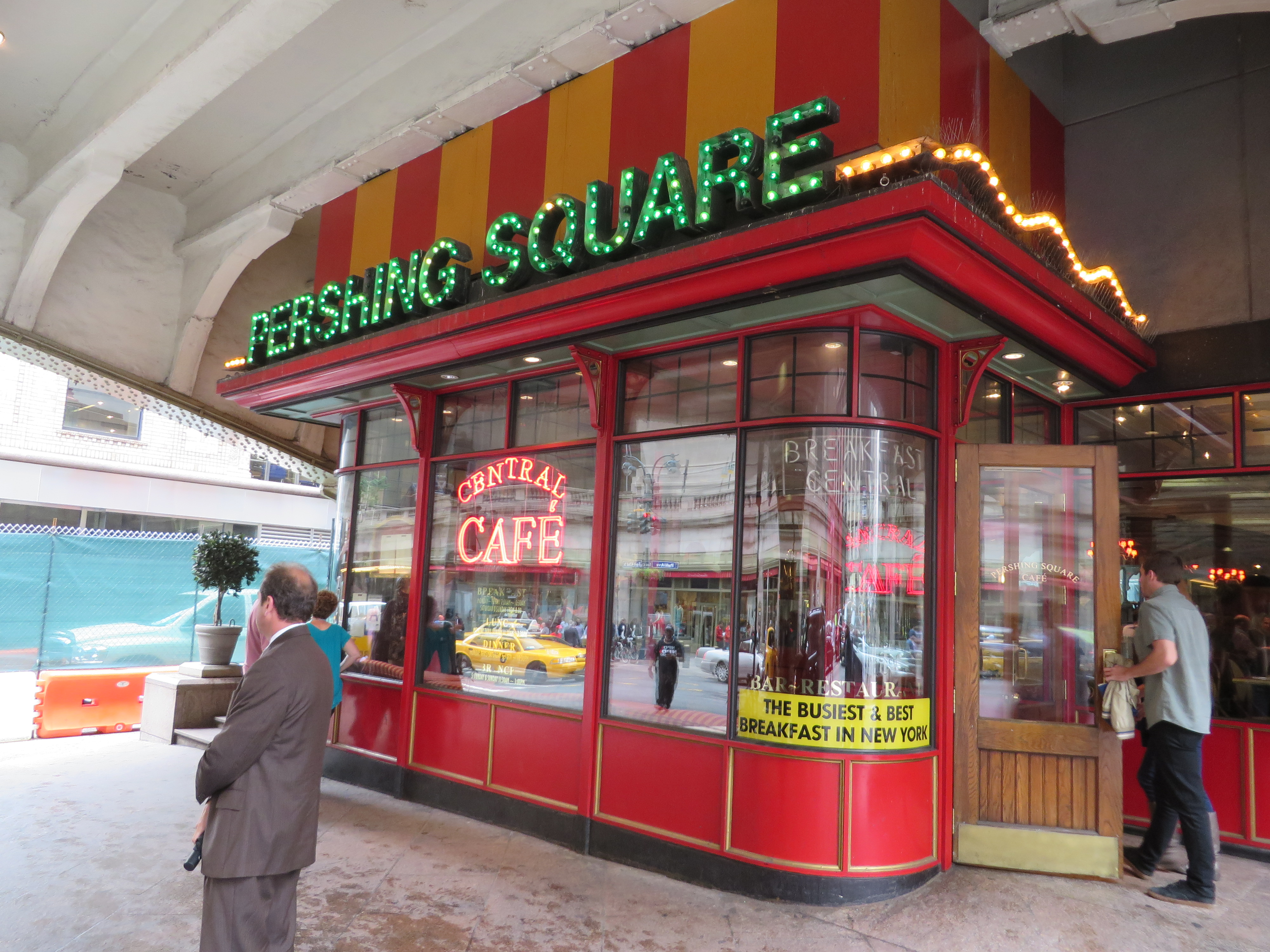
The entrance to the Pershing Square Cafe, which extends to 41st Street under the viaduct

The space under the viaduct between 41st and 42nd Streets was originally used as a trolley barn. In 1938, the city announced that it would build a tourist information center within that space in advance of the 1939 New York World's Fair. The city subsequently built a steel and glass-brick structure under the center arch of the viaduct. The structure, located at 90 East 42nd Street, opened in December 1939 and was initially used to provide tourist information. During World War II, the space was used by United Service Organizations, and after the war, became an outpost of the New York Convention and Visitors Bureau. By 1960, leaks from the viaduct had damaged the information center. That year, a reconstruction project for the viaduct was announced, which involved repairing trusses as well as installing drainage and a nonskid deck.

The former tourist-information center had become an unemployment office by the 1980s. The viaduct had also become dilapidated, with potholes, leaks, and rusted steel supports, so the city government undertook the first major renovations in the viaduct's history. The southbound roadway was closed in July 1984, reopening that November. The northbound roadway was then closed from May 1985 to September 1985. The viaduct's original lamps were removed in a 1986 repaving project. An $8 million restoration of the viaduct was announced three years later. As part of the renovation, the Grand Central Partnership would turn the space between 41st and 42nd Streets into a restaurant. Seven of the original lamps were also restored in 1992.

In 1995, the city and the Grand Central Partnership unveiled plans to restore the space under the viaduct at a cost of $2 million, then lease it as a restaurant. The restaurant space would be located in the former site of the World's Fair information center. The Pershing Square Cafe signed a lease at the space in 1997. The owner of the renovated space, Michael O'Keeffe, placed so much attention to the renovation of the space that the project's costs increased to $5 million, and the cafe's opening date was pushed back by several months. In 2026, as part of a redesign of Park Avenue north of 46th Street, the New York City Department of Transportation considered adding a bike lane to the western leg of the viaduct. The Pershing Square Cafe under the viaduct shut down that year.

== Critical reception and landmark designations ==
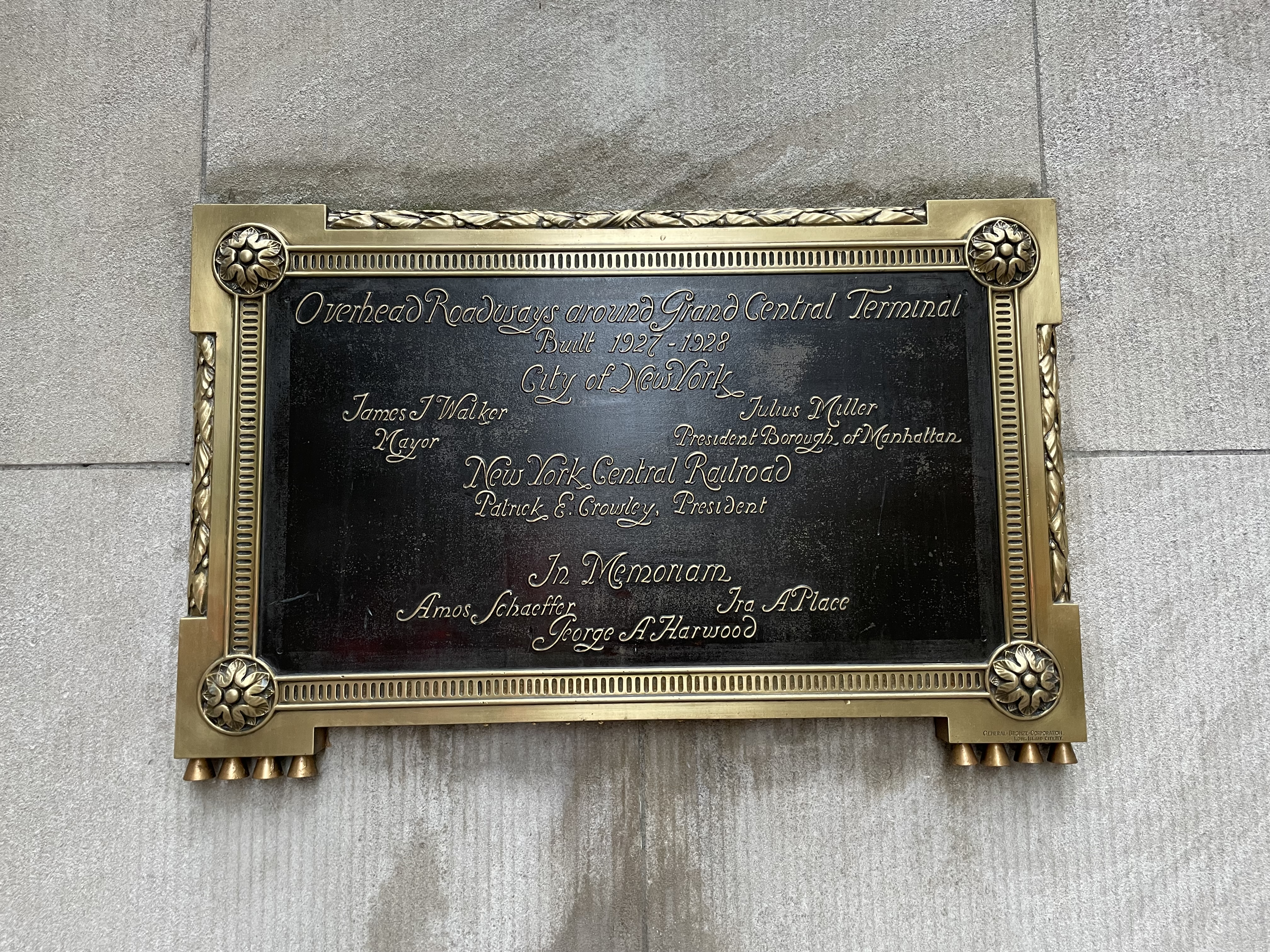
NY Central Building Plaque commemorating completion of overhead roadways

When the Park Avenue Viaduct opened, it was praised as a solution to the traffic congestion around Grand Central Terminal. In 1922, the New-York Tribune called it one of several works of "engineering magic". Christopher Gray, architecture critic at The New York Times, wrote that "the completion of the viaduct suddenly changed Park Avenue from an inconvenient local street to the most modern highway in New York." The building's design in relation to Grand Central Terminal was also lauded. Architecture magazine said that the design "has produced a beautiful and satisfying work of truly monumental character."

The Park Avenue Viaduct was designated a New York City landmark in 1980. In its report, the New York City Landmarks Preservation Commission wrote that the viaduct "is an integral part of the complex circulation system of Grand Central Terminal". The viaduct was listed on the National Register of Historic Places in 1983, technically as a "boundary increase" to the Grand Central Terminal's listing, but carrying a separate reference number. Both designations apply only to the section of the viaduct between 40th and 42nd Streets.

== See also ==
- List of New York City Designated Landmarks in Manhattan from 14th to 59th Streets
- National Register of Historic Places listings in Manhattan from 14th to 59th Streets
