= List of historical common names =

This is an incomplete list of historical common names. Names may have been changed because they were considered pejorative.

== Places ==
=== Istanbul ===
- Constantinople

=== Ho Chi Minh City ===
- Saigon - pre-1976

=== Mumbai ===
- Bombay - pre-1995

== Diseases and disabilities ==
=== Down syndrome ===
- Mongolism

=== Physically disabled ===
- Crippled
- Handicapped

=== Tuberculosis ===
- Consumption - until 2000s
- Tuberculosis

== Peoples ==
=== Of African descent ===
- Nigger
- Negro
- Coloured
- Black - still in use
- African-American - in the United States

=== Indigenous peoples of North America ===
- Indian - pre-1960s
- Native American - since 1960s
- Indigenous - 1980s
- First Nations

=== Romani people ===
- Gypsy

== Organizations ==
=== The Church of Jesus Christ of Latter-day Saints ===
- Church of Christ - 1830 to 1834
- Church of Jesus Christ of Latter Day Saints - 1834 onward

== See also ==
- Geographical naming disputes
- Ethnonymy
