= Pershing Square =

Pershing Square may refer to:

- Pershing Square, a plaza in downtown Los Angeles
- Pershing Square Building (Los Angeles), kitty-corner from Pershing Square in downtown Los Angeles
- Pershing Square, Manhattan
- Pershing Square Capital Management
- Pershing Square Foundation, a private family foundation ran by the CEO of Pershing Square Capital Management
- Pershing Square Building in Manhattan
- Pershing Square Viaduct, another name for the Park Avenue Viaduct, Manhattan
- Pershing Square (train), a named passenger train of the New York, New Haven and Hartford Railroad, see List of named passenger trains of the United States (N–R)
- Pershing Square Cafe in Manhattan – see Pershing Square, Manhattan
