= The Perch SSSI =

Protected area in Somerset, England

The Perch
- Site of Special Scientific Interest
- Location within Somerset
- Location of The Perch.
- Area of search: Somerset
- Grid reference: ST480532
- Coordinates: 51.27556°N 2.74685°W
- Interest: Biological
- Area: 72.1 hectares (0.721 km^{2}; 0.278 sq mi)
- Notification date: 1990

The Perch (grid reference ST480532) is a 72.1 hectare (178.2 acre) biological Site of Special Scientific Interest close to Cheddar Gorge in the Mendip Hills, Somerset, England. It received SSSI notification in 1990.

This site is important because it supports populations of nationally rare and scarce plants, together with grassland and woodland habitats which are nationally restricted in distribution.

The site is located on the south side of the Mendip Hills occupying a position on a steep-sided ridge which runs north to south. The underlying rocks are almost entirely carboniferous limestone with a small amount of Triassic dolomitic conglomerate.

The nationally rare purple gromwell (Lithospermum purpurocaeruleum) and the nationally scarce Ivy Broomrape (Orobanche hederae) also occur. Three species of orchid occur in these grassland areas: the Green-winged Orchid (Orchis morio), the pyramidal orchid (Anacamptis pyramidalis) and the Autumn Ladies'-tresses (Spiranthes spiralis). Two nationally rare plants, the Cheddar pink (Dianthus gratianopolitanus) and the Cheddar bedstraw (Galium fleurotii) are found on this site, as are two nationally scarce species: the rock stonecrop (Sedum forsterianum) and the spring cinquefoil (Potentilla tabernaemontani).

This variety of habitats ensures that a wide range of fauna occurs on the site. In total 22 species of mammal have been recorded including a strong population of dormouse (Muscardinus avellanarius) and five species of bat, including the Greater Horseshoe bat (Rhinolophus ferrumequinum) and Lesser Horseshoe bat (Rhinolophus hipposideros) which use the site for feeding. One small roost of lesser horseshoe bats is known. Both species of horseshoe bat are nationally rare. Thirty species of birds are known to breed within this site and at least 23 species of butterfly breed here.
