= Pershing Township =

Pershing Township may refer to one of the following places within the United States:

- Pershing Township, Jackson County, Indiana
- Pershing Township, Burt County, Nebraska
