= Summer Streets =

Annual event in New York City

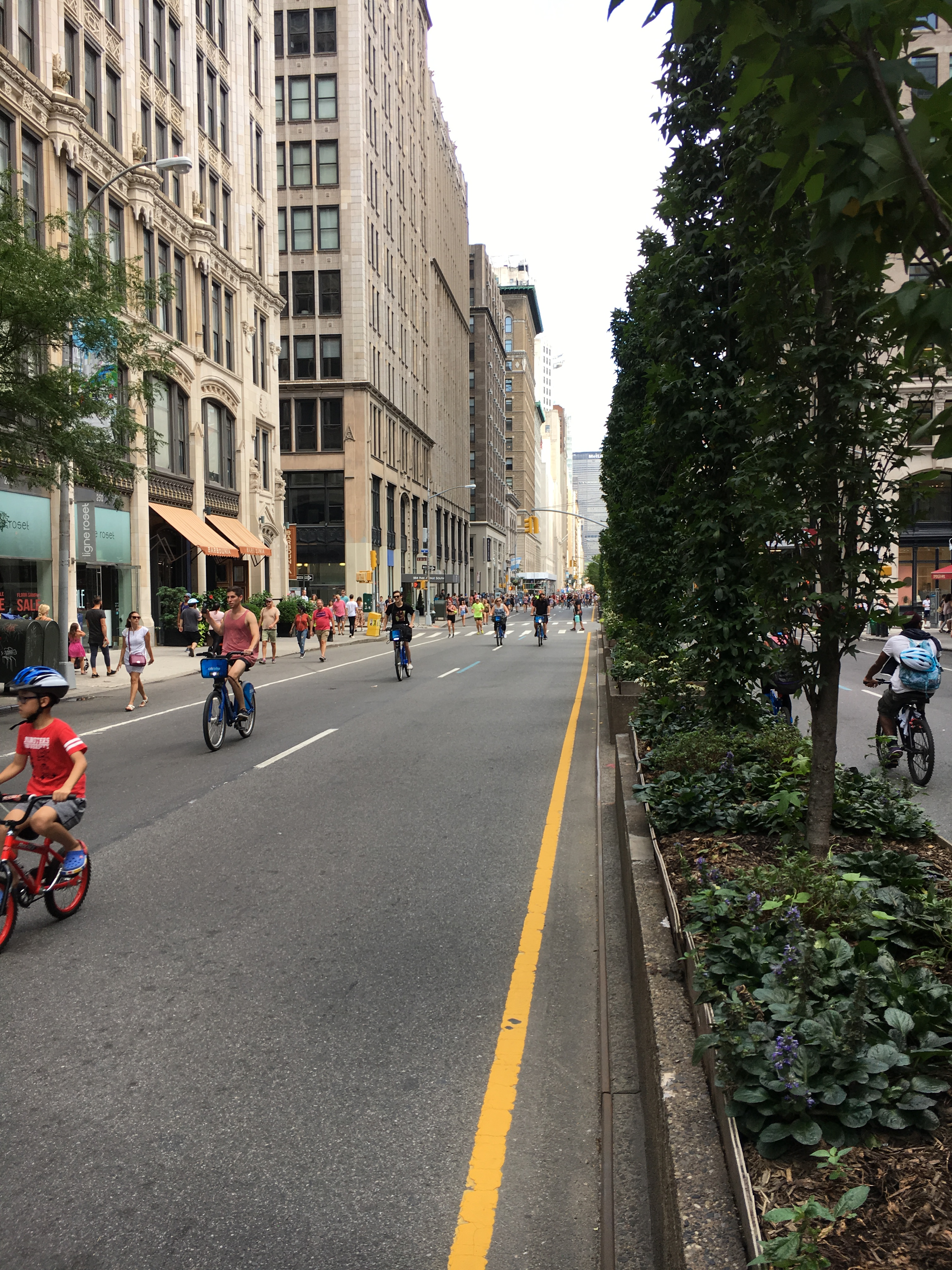
- Cyclists, runners and walkers on Park Avenue South during the 2017 Summer Streets event.
- Status: active
- Genre: Open streets
- Frequency: annual
- Locations: New York City, New York
- Coordinates: 40°45′23″N 73°58′28″W
- Country: United States
- Years active: 18
- Inaugurated: August 9, 2008
- Attendance: 300,000
- Organizer: New York City Department of Transportation
- Website: Official website

Summer Streets is an annual event organized during the month of August in the streets of New York City since 2008. From 7 am to 3 pm every Saturday in August, over 400 blocks of streets (including Park Avenue and Lafayette Street in Manhattan between 109th Street and Brooklyn Bridge) are open for walkers, runners, and cyclists and closed for motor vehicles. The event alternates between boroughs every weekend and features street performers, water stations, free bike rentals and helmets, free bike repair, and other giveaways from corporate sponsors. The event attracted 300,000 people in 2022.

== History ==
=== Launch ===
The idea of the Summer Streets program came in 2008 from commissioner of New York City Department of Transportation Janette Sadik-Khan under the mayoralty of Michael Bloomberg, as part of a broader plan to reduce car traffic and encourage walking and biking as a mode of transportation in New York City. The concept was inspired by a similar program called Ciclovía in Bogotá, Colombia, which has existed since 1974 and consists of the closure of 70 miles (110 km) of streets for biking, walking and even dancing.

The initiative consisted as the creation of a car-free zone in the island on Manhattan on three Saturday mornings: August 9, 16 and 23. The car-free route stretched for 6.9 miles (11.1 km), including Park Avenue and Lafayette Street between 72nd Street and Brooklyn Bridge. The zone was open to walkers, cyclists and even yoga classes. The program, which cost around $300,000 per day, was supposed to be an experiment. This first edition was attended by 50,000 people each Saturday.

The program was renewed in 2009 on August 8, 15 and 22. The city rented out 150 orange bicycles from the Dutch government and made them available along the course. Some small portions of streets in other boroughs were closed as part of the initiative.

=== Art installations ===
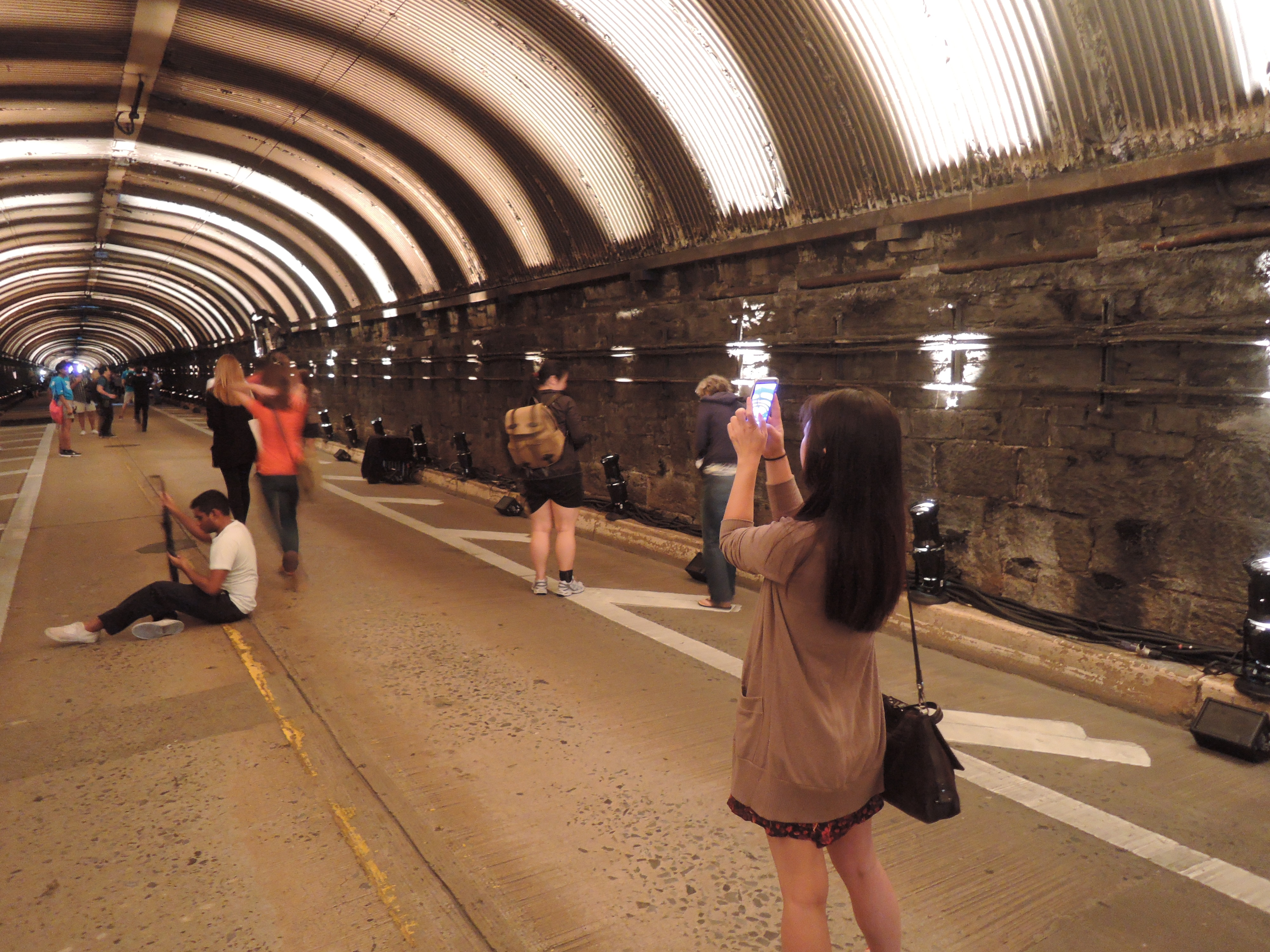
The Park Avenue Tunnel during Summer Streets in 2013

In 2013, the city decided to include the Park Avenue Tunnel to the Summer Streets program, a tunnel between 33rd and 40th Streets that has been closed to pedestrians since the 1930s. An interactive art show by Rafael Lozano-Hemmer called "Voice Tunnel" was installed, allowing participants to deliver short messages into a silver intercom in the middle of the tunnel, the messages then echoing in the tunnel.

The following year, an interactive installation by Norwegian artist Jana Winderen was installed in the tunnel as part as the Summer Streets program. The installation, called "Dive", intended to immerse pedestrians in an undersea ambiance, and included sounds of waves, clicking fish and boats.

A set of 50 vinyl-on-aluminum signs by artist Ryan McGinness was installed on traffic lights and sign posts along the route of the Summer Streets program. The signs looked like official red-and-black transportation signs, but instead displayed elements such as unicorns, sea monsters or other abstract patterns. 40 of the 50 signs were stolen after three days.

In 2015, mural artist Stephen Powers was commissioned by the city to create an art installation to promote sustainable transportation. The artist hand-painted 30 different signs that were fixed along the route of the event. Despite being installed at 7 feet (2.1 m) heights to prevent art theft like the previous year, as of August 6 most of the signs had been stolen.

=== COVID hiatus and expansion ===
The event was canceled in 2020 because of the COVID-19 pandemic in New York City but returned in 2021. In 2022, in its biggest extension since its inception in 2008, the route was extended by two miles (3.2 km) to 109th Street in East Harlem.

In 2023, the program expanded to the five boroughs for a total of 20 miles (32.2 km) of car-free zone, including the closure of streets in Queens, Staten Island, Brooklyn, and the Bronx.

== Route ==
From 2008 to 2022, the route of the program ran only in Manhattan from 72nd Street to Brooklyn Bridge along Centre Street, Lafayette Street, Fourth Avenue and Park Avenue. The southern half of 72nd Street from Park Avenue to Fifth Avenue was also shut down to link the route to Central Park. In 2013 and 2014, the Park Avenue Tunnel was included to the route.

By 2022, the route extended north of 72nd Street up to 109th Street in East Harlem. In 2023, the program expanded to 20 miles (32.2 km) across all five boroughs. Beside the Manhattan route, the closed streets included Vernon Boulevard in Queens, Richmond Terrace in Staten Island, Eastern Parkway in Brooklyn, and Grand Concourse in the Bronx.

In 2025, the route was extended to include the northern part of Manhattan, adding the section of Broadway running from 110th Street in Morningside Heights to Dyckman Street in Inwood. 110th Street was used as a link in the route between Broadway and Park Avenue in East Harlem.

== See also ==
- Ciclovia in the United States
