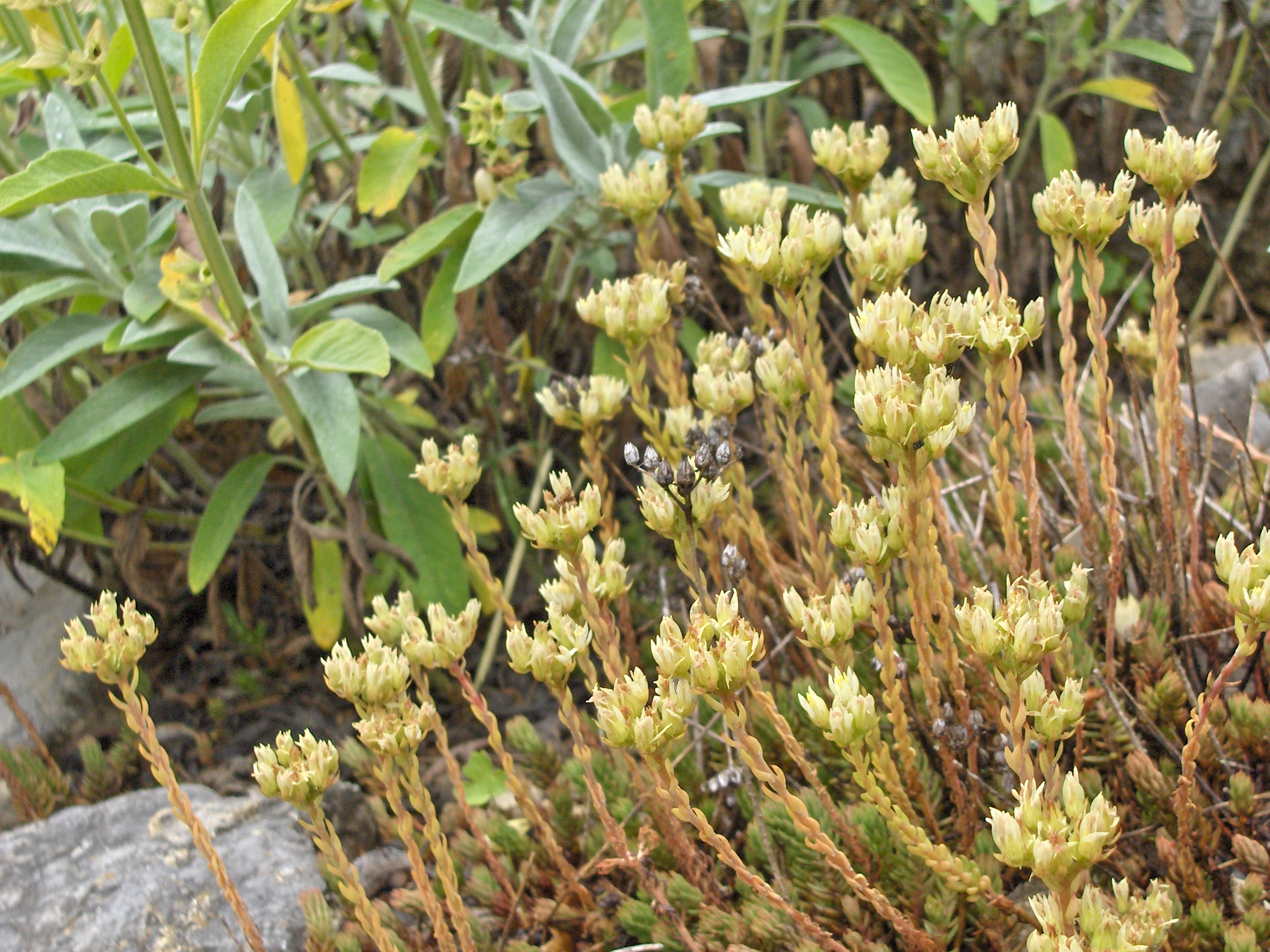

Scientific classification
- Kingdom: Plantae
- Clade: Tracheophytes
- Clade: Angiosperms
- Clade: Eudicots
- Order: Saxifragales
- Family: Crassulaceae
- Genus: Petrosedum
- Species: P. ochroleucum

Binomial name
- Petrosedum ochroleucum Chaix) Niederle

Synonyms
- List: Sedum ochroleucum Chaix; Petrosedum anopetalum (DC.) Grulich; Petrosedum rupestre subsp. anopetalum (DC.) Velayos; Sedum anopetalum DC.; Sedum verlotii Jord.

= Petrosedum ochroleucum =

Species of succulent

Petrosedum ochroleucum, the European stonecrop, is a species of plant in the family Crassulaceae native to Europe and Turkey.
