= Porch (disambiguation) =

A porch is an architectural element of building entrances.

Porch may also refer to:

- The Porch or Stoa Poikile (5th century BC), part of the Ancient Agora of Athens, Greece
- Porch (company), an online home-improvement resource platform
- "Porch" (Pearl Jam song), from their 1991 album Ten
- Front porch campaign, a form of home-based political campaigning
- Porch (broadcasting), a video synchronization technique
- Garage (residential) or car porch
- Robert Porch (1875-1962), English cricketer
- Vestibule (architecture), sometimes referred to as a porch
- "Back Porch", by Dierks Bentley from his 2014 album Riser (album)
- "Back Porch", by Limp Bizkit from their 2011 album Gold Cobra

== See also ==
- Porches (disambiguation)
- Porsche, an automobile company
