= Silver perch =

Silver perch is a common name for several fishes and may refer to:

- Bairdiella chrysoura, native to the east coast of the United States
- Bidyanus bidyanus, endemic to Australia
- Leiopotherapon plumbeus, endemic to the Philippines
