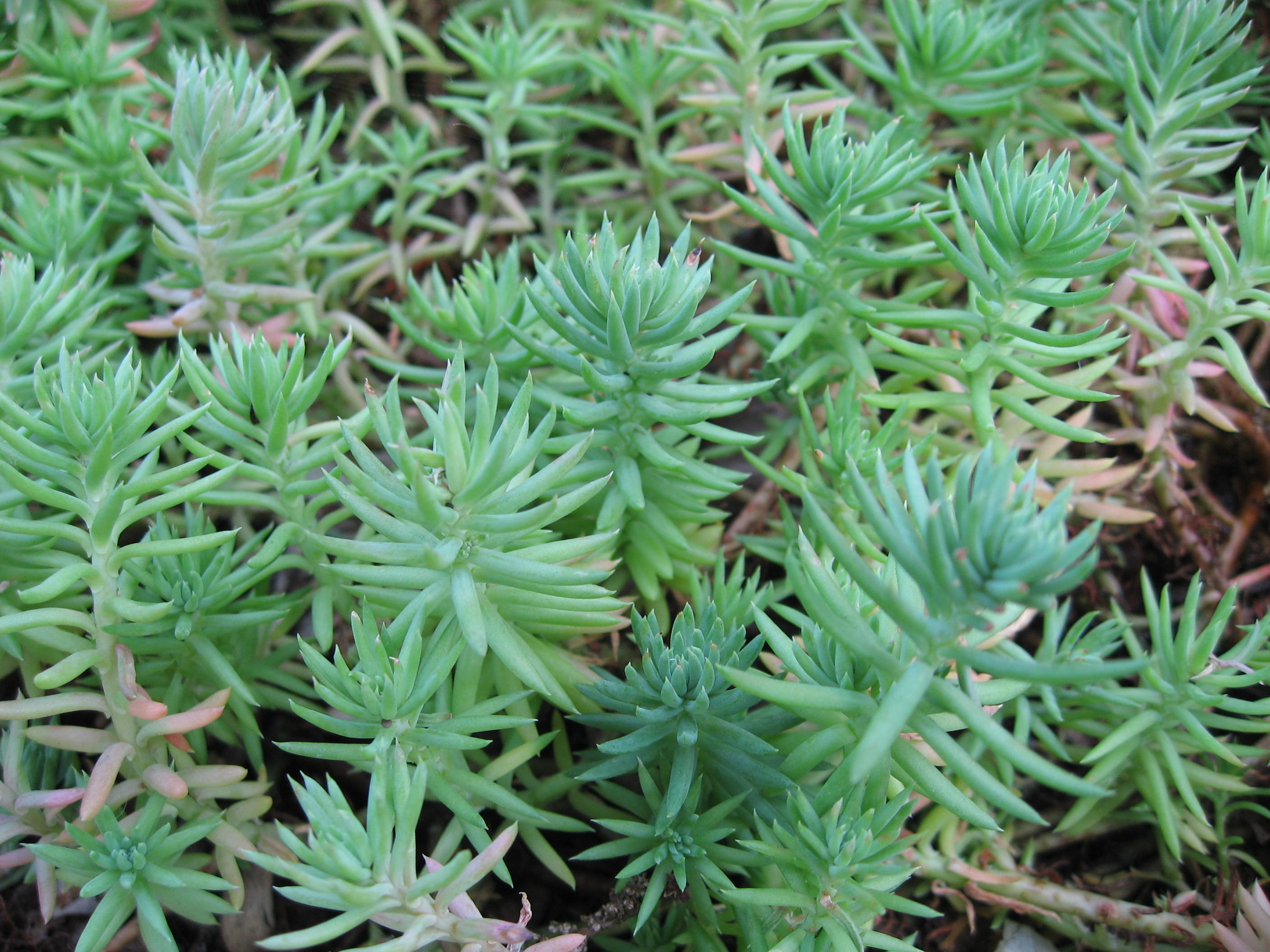

Scientific classification
- Kingdom: Plantae
- Clade: Tracheophytes
- Clade: Angiosperms
- Clade: Eudicots
- Order: Saxifragales
- Family: Crassulaceae
- Genus: Petrosedum
- Species: P. rupestre

Binomial name
- Petrosedum rupestre (L.) P.V.Heath

Synonyms
- List: Sedum rupestre L.; Petrosedum reflexum (L.) Grulich; Petrosedum rupestre subsp. reflexum (L.) Velayos; Sedum albescens Haw.; Sedum caesium Boreau ex Pérard; Sedum collinum Willd.; Sedum crassicaule Link; Sedum cristatum Schrad.; Sedum fragile Dumort.; Sedum glaucum Haw.; Sedum glaucum Sm.; Sedum graniticum Pérard; Sedum luteum Garsault; Sedum minus Haw.; Sedum nutans Haw.; Sedum recurvatum Willd.; Sedum reflexum L.; Sedum septangulare Haw.; Sedum virens Aiton; Sedum virescens Willd.

= Petrosedum rupestre =

Species of flowering plant in the stonecrop family

Petrosedum rupestre, also known as reflexed stonecrop, Jenny's stonecrop, blue stonecrop, stone orpine, prick-madam and trip-madam, is a species of perennial succulent flowering plant in the family Crassulaceae, native to northern, central, and southern Europe.

== Description ==
Petrosedum rupestre plants are typically up to 10 cm high, with sprawling stems and stiff foliage resembling spruce branches, with softer tissue. The leaves are frequently blue-gray to gray but range to light greens and yellows; the flowers are yellow. Like many Sedum species, it has a prostrate, spreading habit.

== Cultivation ==
Petrosedum rupestre is a popular ornamental plant, grown in gardens, containers, and as houseplants. It is drought-tolerant. There are named cultivars with variegated (multi-colored) leaves. Through vegetative cloning it is propagated from cuttings.

This sedum is prone to fasciation (cristate forms), which produces attractive cactus-like forms, with irregular curves. However it reverts easily, so all normal offshoots need to be removed quickly to maintain the cristate form.

Petrosedum rupestre is occasionally used as a salad leaf or herb in Europe, including the United Kingdom. It is said to have a slightly astringent or sour taste.
