= 270 Park Avenue (1960–2021) =

Skyscraper in Manhattan, New York

Union Carbide Building 270 Park Avenue
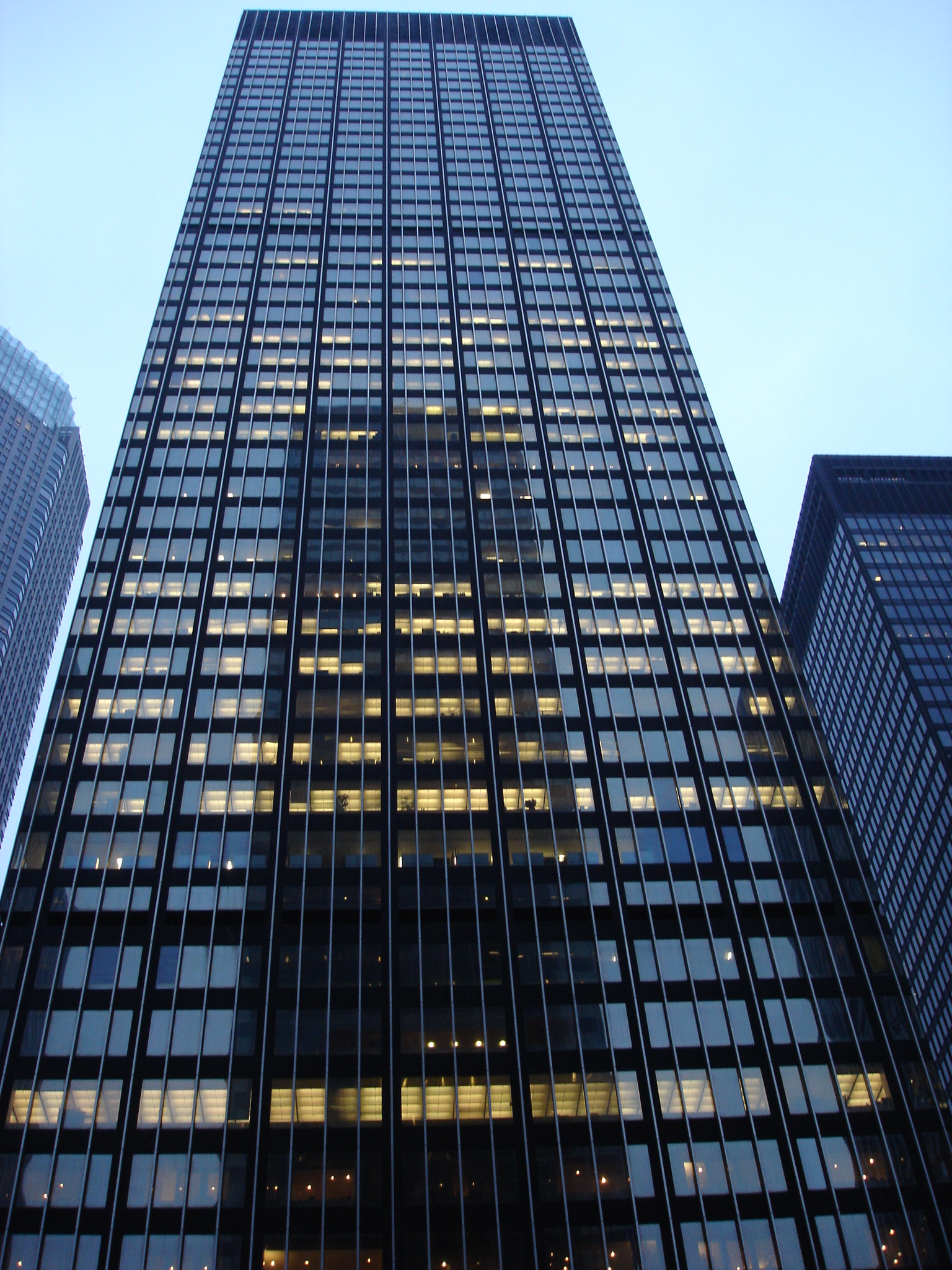
- 270 Park Avenue in April 2008

General information
- Status: Demolished
- Architectural style: International
- Location: 270 Park Avenue; Manhattan, New York 10017, U.S.
- Coordinates: 40°45′21″N 73°58′32″W
- Construction started: 1957
- Completed: 1960
- Closed: 2018
- Demolished: 2019–2021

Height
- Architectural: 707 ft (215 m)

Technical details
- Floor count: 52
- Floor area: 1,500,000 sq ft (140,000 m^{2})

Design and construction
- Architects: Gordon Bunshaft; Natalie de Blois; both of: Skidmore, Owings and Merrill

270 Park Avenue, also known as the JPMorgan Chase Tower and the Union Carbide Building, was a skyscraper in the Midtown Manhattan neighborhood of New York City, United States. Built in 1960 for chemical company Union Carbide, it was designed by the architects Gordon Bunshaft and Natalie de Blois of Skidmore, Owings & Merrill (SOM). The 52-story, 707-foot (215 m) skyscraper later became the global headquarters for JPMorgan Chase. It was demolished in 2021 to make way for a taller skyscraper at the same address. At the time of its destruction, the Union Carbide Building was the tallest voluntarily demolished building in the world, and it remains the tallest voluntarily demolished building in the United States.

The building occupied a full city block bounded by Madison Avenue, 48th Street, Park Avenue, and 47th Street. It was composed of two sections: a 52-story tower facing Park Avenue to the east and a 12-story annex facing Madison Avenue to the west, both surrounded by public plazas. About two-thirds of 270 Park Avenue was built over two levels of underground railroad tracks, which feed directly into Grand Central Terminal to the south. This not only prevented a basement from being built under most of the site but also required that the lobby be one story above ground level. Union Carbide's offices were designed around a grid of 5-by-5-foot (1.5 by 1.5 m) modules. The offices contained flexible furnishings and partitions, as well as luminous ceilings. The Union Carbide Building received mixed reviews during its existence, and the presence of the building's plazas helped influence the 1961 Zoning Resolution.

The site was occupied by the Hotel Marguery between 1917 and 1957. Union Carbide leased the land from New York Central Railroad (later Penn Central) and announced plans for the building in 1955. Union Carbide moved into its headquarters in 1960 and acquired the underlying land in 1976 after Penn Central went bankrupt. After three years of negotiations, Union Carbide agreed in 1978 to sell the building to Manufacturers Hanover Corporation. Manufacturers Hanover moved into 270 Park Avenue in 1980 and renovated the building. Through several mergers, Manufacturers Hanover became part of JPMorgan Chase, which announced plans to demolish the building in 2018. Despite preservationists' objections, the Union Carbide Building was demolished from 2019 to 2021.

== Site ==
270 Park Avenue was in the Midtown Manhattan neighborhood of New York City, United States. It occupied an entire city block bounded by Madison Avenue to the west, 48th Street to the north, Park Avenue to the east, and 47th Street to the south. The land lot covered about 80,000 square feet (7,400 m^{2}) with a frontage of 200 feet (61 m) on either avenue and 400 feet (120 m) on either street. Nearby buildings include the old New York Mercantile Library and 400 Madison Avenue to the west; Tower 49 to the northwest; 277 Park Avenue to the east; 245 Park Avenue to the southeast; and 383 Madison Avenue to the south.

By the late 19th century, the Park Avenue railroad line ran in an open cut in the middle of Park Avenue. The line was covered with the construction of Grand Central Terminal in the early 20th century, spurring development in the surrounding area, Terminal City. Among the developments were office buildings such as the Chanin Building, Bowery Savings Bank Building, and New York Central Building, as well as hotels like the Biltmore, Commodore, Waldorf Astoria, and Summit. On the site of 270 Park Avenue, the developer Charles V. Paterno constructed the six-building Hotel Marguery complex, which opened in 1917. The stone-clad hotel was 12 stories high and designed in the Renaissance Revival style. By 1920, the area had become what The New York Times called "a great civic centre". At the time, the section of Park Avenue north of Grand Central Terminal contained many apartment houses for the rich. Largely commercial International Style skyscrapers replaced many of the residential structures on Park Avenue during the 1950s and 1960s.

== Architecture ==
The Union Carbide Building was designed by the architects Gordon Bunshaft and Natalie de Blois of Skidmore, Owings & Merrill (SOM) for the chemical company Union Carbide. Bunshaft publicly took credit, even though de Blois was the main designer. As early as the 1980s, The New York Times attributed the design mainly to de Blois. This made the Union Carbide Building the world's tallest building designed by a woman for about fifty years after its completion. After de Blois died in 2013, David W. Dunlap of the Times said that, even though SOM projects were collaborations between several designers, "there is little doubt that Ms. de Blois [...] was long denied her due".

Several engineers and contractors were also involved in the building's construction. Weiskopf and Pickworth was hired as the structural engineer; George A. Fuller was the general contractor; Syska Hennessy were the lighting, mechanical, and electrical consultants; and Bolt, Beranek, and Newman Inc. were the acoustic consultants. The Union Carbide Building, the Seagram Building, Lever House, and the Pepsi-Cola Building were part of a grouping of International Style structures developed on Park Avenue from 46th to 59th Street during the mid-20th century. The Union Carbide Building shared some features with SOM's nearly-contemporary Pepsi-Cola Building—including a massing recessed from the sidewalk, a detailed steel-and-glass facade, and a modular interior floor plan—although Union Carbide's structure was significantly taller, with a black facade.

=== Form and facade ===
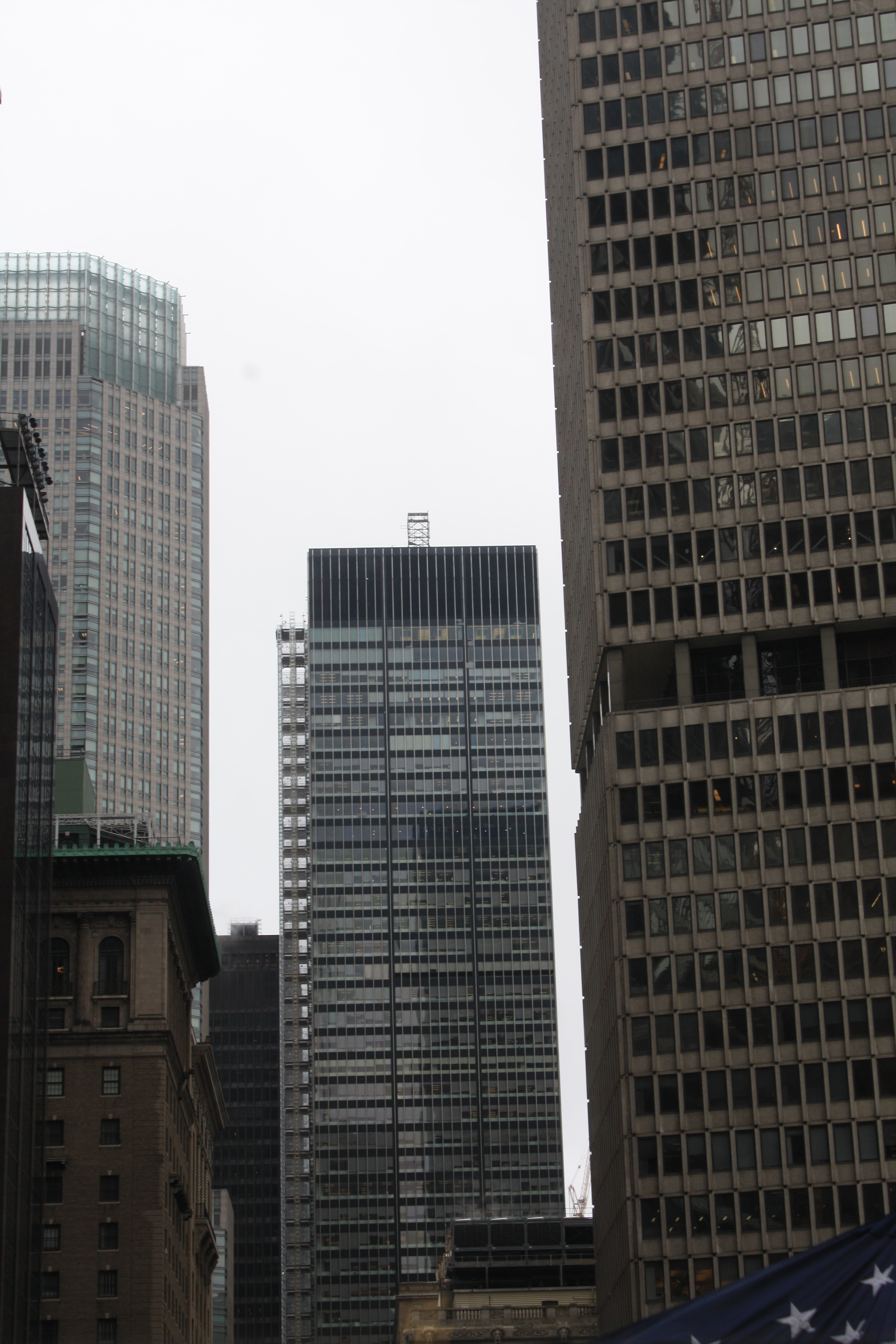
The building (center), seen from the south in February 2019. 383 Madison Avenue is visible at left, and the MetLife Building is visible at right.

Measuring 707 feet (215 m) tall, the Union Carbide Building was the tallest structure on Park Avenue upon its completion in 1960, as well as the tallest building erected in the city since 1933. It was one of the last skyscrapers in New York City to be designed under the principles of the 1916 Zoning Resolution. The main tower was 52 stories tall and faced Park Avenue; there was also a 12- or 13-story western annex that faced Madison Avenue. The annex measured 189 feet (58 m) high. The building was set back 50 feet (15 m) from the lot line along Park Avenue and 23 feet (7.0 m) from the lot line on each side street. (Note: Some sources cite the tower as being recessed 33 feet (10 m) from 47th and 48th Streets. SOM itself said the tower was recessed 33 feet from Park Avenue, in contrast with the 50-foot figure given by other sources.) The Madison Avenue annex was set back 13 feet (4.0 m) from Madison Avenue. The ground-level entrances were recessed another 38 feet (12 m) behind the facade, giving the appearance of a colonnade in front of the entrances. The ground floor of the annex had a platform for truck deliveries, as well as some storefronts.

The facade included a curtain wall of gray-tinted glass, which covered 6.5 acres (280,000 ft^{2}; 26,000 m^{2}) of the facade. Each glass panel measured 0.25 inches (6.4 mm) thick, and the facade was composed of 6,824 panels. The horizontal spandrels between each story were made of black metal, covering 4.5 acres (200,000 ft^{2}; 18,000 m^{2}) of the facade. The spandrels were made of stainless steel on their outward faces; asbestos honeycomb in their cores; and aluminum sheeting on their inward faces. Silver stainless steel vertical mullions, spaced 5 feet (1.5 m) apart, divided the facade into bays. Each set of spandrels was manufactured simultaneously with half of the mullions next to them. The mullions doubled as rails for the Union Carbide Building's window washing scaffold.

The stainless steel was used at the request of the building's original tenant—Union Carbide, which wanted to use as much of the material as possible—and was manufactured by General Bronze. The spandrels and mullions were covered with products made by Electro Metallurgical Co., a subsidiary of Union Carbide. Electro Metallurgical used a proprietary process called "Permyron" to blacken the spandrels. This allowed the black-matte finish to remain on the spandrels permanently; at the time, black-matte finishes could wear off if they were applied using any other method. Spandrels and windows of a different design were used for the mechanical stories on the intermediate and upper levels.

==== Plazas ====
On all sides of the block, there was a plaza between the building and the lot line, which comprised about 44 percent of the entire lot. The plaza was made of pink terrazzo tiles, which were patterned similarly to the sidewalk at the nearly contemporary 1271 Avenue of the Americas. The plaza had a flagpole, a feature present in other buildings erected in New York City around the same time. The terrazzo sidewalks tended to become slippery when it rained or snowed. The sidewalk in 270 Park Avenue's plaza was so slippery that, less than a year after the building was completed in 1960, acid etching was applied to the tiles to roughen their surfaces. This was finally replaced in the 1980s with black granite, which provided a rough-textured surface. Two 120-foot-long (37 m) fountains, one each on 47th and 48th Streets, were also built during this renovation.

At the center of the site, separating the main 52-story tower and the Madison Avenue annex, a 60-foot-wide (18 m) wide public plaza connected 47th and 48th Streets. The central plaza served as a one-block extension of Vanderbilt Avenue, which ran from 42nd to 47th Street. The site of the plaza had been intended as a northward extension of Vanderbilt Avenue to 49th Street; the New York Central Railroad had built this section of Vanderbilt Avenue in 1913, but it was never deeded to the government of New York City. Inside the central plaza, SOM provided space for a future pedestrian connection to Grand Central Terminal several blocks south. An entrance to the terminal, with an elevator, was ultimately instead built on the north side of 47th Street east of Madison Avenue. Work on this entrance began in 1997 as part of the Grand Central North project and was completed in 1999.

=== Structural features ===
About two-thirds of 270 Park Avenue was built atop two levels of underground railroad tracks, which feed directly into Grand Central Terminal to the south. This prevented the building from using a conventional foundation that was sunk into the ground. The building was erected above 24 tracks on the upper level and 17 tracks on the lower level. Because of the differing track layouts, each level is supported by different sets of columns. To accommodate the Union Carbide Building, new beams had to be installed on the lower track level; the beams weighed up to 18.5 short tons (16.5 long tons; 16.8 t) and measured as little as 4 inches (100 mm) thick. In total, contractors installed 115 columns through the two levels of tracks, descending to the underlying layer of bedrock. Asbestos pads and lead panels were also installed to reduce vibrations from trains. The footings were as much as 60 feet (18 m) deep. Ninety-five steel stilts, which had supported 70 percent of the former Hotel Marguery, were replaced by heavier columns that could carry the newer building's weight.

The basement columns were spaced every 20 feet (6.1 m) from north to south. The columns were spaced more irregularly from west to east, being placed to avoid tracks on the upper track level. The tracks below the easternmost section of the site are curved, so girders were used to transfer weight above the tracks. The basement only extended underneath the 12-story-tall Madison Avenue annex. As a result, the main tower's cooling equipment had to be installed on the roof. The air-conditioning system on the roof was composed of two 70,000-pound (32,000 kg) air conditioning chillers, which served the cooling system above the 30th story. Three chillers in the basement served the 30th story and below.

=== Interior ===
When completed, the Union Carbide Building had a gross floor area of 1.5 million square feet (140,000 m^{2}), though the rentable floor area was only 1.16 million square feet (108,000 m^{2}). Each floor of the tower on Park Avenue covered 17,500 square feet (1,630 m^{2}), while each floor in the Madison Avenue annex covered 37,500 square feet (3,480 m^{2}).

==== Lobby ====
The lobby was designed by Natalie de Blois and Jack G. Dunbar of SOM. The building had two entrance halls at ground level. The elevator pits could not descend below the ground, or first, story due to the presence of the tracks. To maximize the height of the elevator pits, SOM placed the elevator lobby on the second story. Escalators from the ground story led to the second-story mezzanine, flanking an elevator core with red wall cladding. There were two sets of escalators, one from each entrance hall. The escalators, highly visible from the facade, gave off a sculptured appearance.

The mezzanine covered 6,000 square feet (560 m^{2}) and was 25 feet (7.6 m) high. The walls of the lobby were made of corrugated stainless steel, with intermediate sections being painted black. In addition, black steel cladding was used on the columns. The lobby columns spaced every 20 feet (6.1 m) to match the support columns of the underlying tracks. The mezzanine was initially a publicly accessible space with art and science exhibitions. It was unpopular with the public, in part because it was far removed from the street and gave the impression of being a private space. There was also a 24-foot-long (7.3 m) control panel for the elevators in the lobby, as well as a 1,300-seat cafeteria and service rooms. Blueprints indicate that there were 16 elevators in the main tower (divided into two sets of eight elevators), as well as 11 elevators in the annex. The use of high-speed, high-rise elevators reduced the amount of space required for elevator shafts, compared with older buildings.

About 3,060 square feet (284 m^{2}) of the mezzanine was removed in the early 1980s when Manufacturers Hanover Corporation moved into the building. After the renovation, the lobby stood three stories high with a ceiling made of stainless steel. The elevator core was redecorated in bright red metal, and two elevators for the disabled were added between the lobby and the remaining portion of the mezzanine.

==== Offices ====
The office stories contained contemporary furnishings and flexible layouts. Union Carbide wanted at least 60 percent of office space to be near a window. As a result, SOM arranged the offices so about 65 percent of space was within 15 feet (4.6 m) of a window. (Note: Architectural Record 1960b, p. 156, gives a figure of 64 percent.) The offices were arranged in a grid of 5-by-5-foot (1.5 by 1.5 m) modules, inspired by the spacing of columns between the railroad tracks below. This arose from Union Carbide's requirement that office layouts be flexible enough to be rearranged overnight. Bunshaft and de Blois had determined that the offices could have been arranged in modules measuring 2.5 by 5 feet (0.76 by 1.52 m), but they decided that a square module was more flexible. The spacing of the building's columns, as decided upon by the building's engineers, created bays measuring 20 by 40 feet (6.1 by 12.2 m) across.

The ceilings covered 800,000 square feet (74,000 m^{2}). Union Carbide considered six types of ceiling designs during the planning process and ultimately used a luminous ceiling. This consisted of a grid of stainless steel beams, with three layers of plastic sheeting along with angled reflectors. The stainless steel beams were used because they could be prefabricated to a high degree of precision and because they were resistant to scratches. Each beam had a runner on one side, allowing conditioned air to travel efficiently along the ceiling. The runners were placed only on one side to prevent sound from traveling between offices. The runners provided air to offices that were further than 15 feet from a window. The offices at the building's perimeter were served directly by air-conditioning units beneath each window. Light fixtures were placed behind the plastic ceiling panels and were aligned with the building's floor grid. There were no plenum spaces above the ceiling, since the runner system made it unnecessary. In the 1980s, the plastic ceilings were replaced with translucent acoustic panels.

The floor surfaces were covered with 15 acres (650,000 ft^{2}; 61,000 m^{2}) of carpets. Each office was separated by a full-height partition, which was aligned with the ceiling grid. The tops of most partitions were made of clear glass panels, giving the impression of an uninterrupted ceiling. For offices in which the lights could be turned off, these were replaced with mirrored panels. The partitions could also be moved if needed. SOM designed objects, furniture, and decor for Union Carbide's offices, and Union Carbide used its office as a showcase for its plastic and metal products. Filing cabinets and clustered workstations were also designed around modules, which was unusual for the time. At the time of the building's construction, only about 5,000 square feet (460 m^{2}) was reserved for data processing equipment.

Union Carbide's executive offices occupied the corners of the building. These contained decorative details such as marble and wood panels, as well as plants, paintings, and sculptures. On the eleventh floor of the Madison Avenue annex was an employee lounge for Union Carbide. When Manufacturers Hanover took over, the eighth and ninth floors were remodeled into an executive suite with both modern and antique art, as well as an internal connecting staircase. Senior officers had wooden desks with brass fixtures. In addition, the original partitions were replaced with glass walls. When the building was renovated, one-fourth of employees had a workstation, but by the 1990s, almost all employees had workstations. After Manufacturers Hanover took over, there was a 200-seat executive dining room on the 49th floor. In addition, the 50th story contained 16 private dining rooms, as well as three rooms for the chairman and the presidents of the bank's national and international divisions.

== History ==
=== Development ===
==== Planning ====
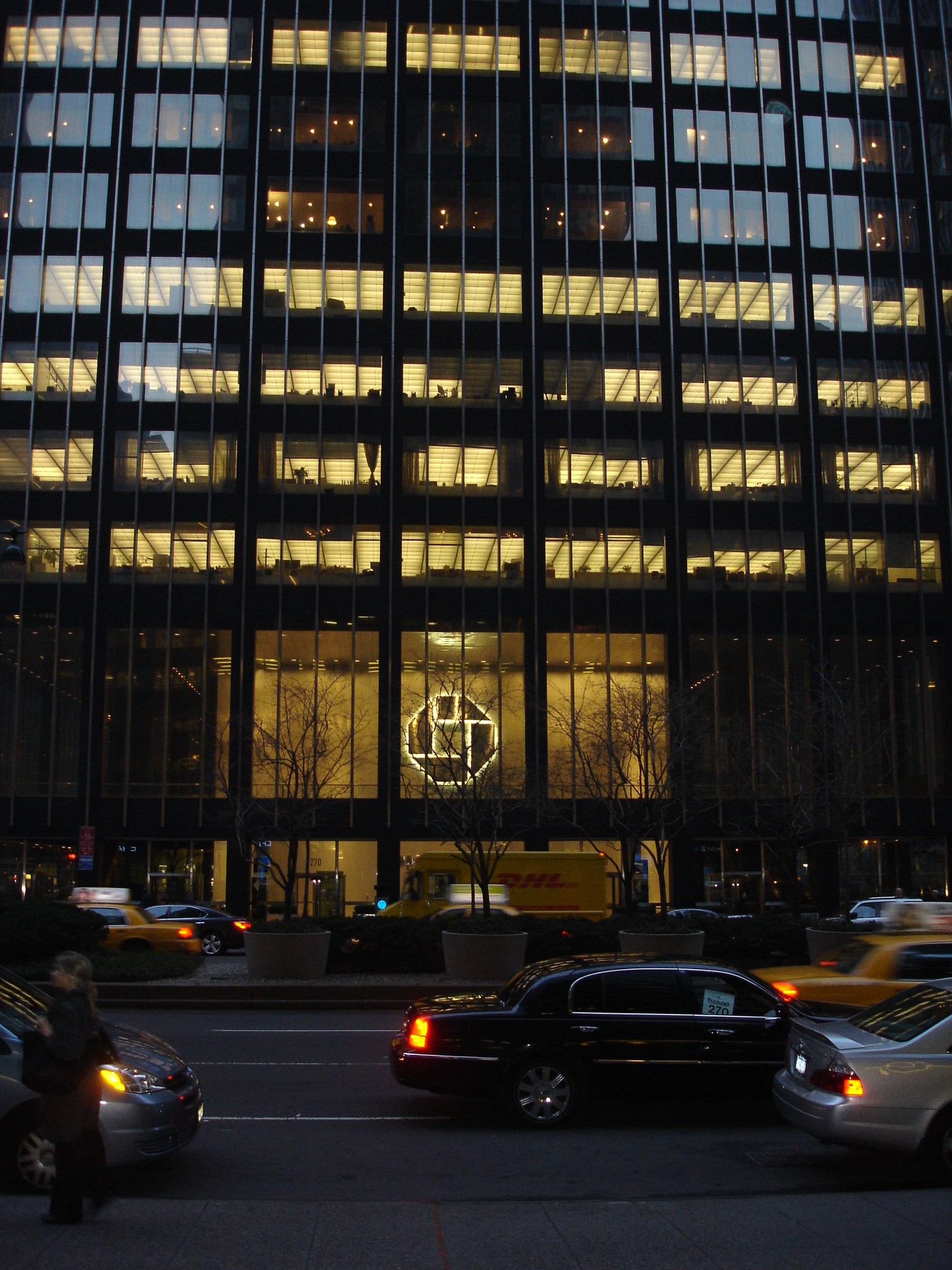
Entrance to the building

Union Carbide had announced its intent in 1952 to move its headquarters from New York City to the suburb of Elmsford in Westchester County, New York, to accommodate a growing staff. The corporation ultimately decided to stay in the city, and, in August 1955, its executives decided to lease the Hotel Marguery site at 270 Park Avenue as the company's world headquarters. At the time, the Marguery's operators had been looking to sell the building for the past decade. Union Carbide leased the location from the New York Central Railroad, paying $250,000 per year plus the property's real estate taxes (estimated to be $1.5 million per year) for a term of at least 22 years. In addition, the company paid the railroad $10 million for the option to acquire the land outright in the future. The developer William Zeckendorf said the lease "marks the beginning of the end to the brief vogue for corporate rustication", in which large corporations had preferred to move out of the city.

The building's general concept was devised by SOM employee William Brown in partnership with Union Carbide executive Morse Dial. Gordon Bunshaft and Natalie de Blois prepared three designs for the building. One plan would have entailed constructing a nine-story base on the entire site, above which a 48-story tower would occupy 25 percent of the site to comply with the 1916 Zoning Resolution. The second plan called for a ziggurat-like tower with multiple setbacks, which would have been larger than the final plan. The third plan called for the tower to rise at the rear of the site along Madison Avenue, avoiding the railroad tracks. Though the ziggurat plan would have been 200,000 square feet (19,000 m^{2}) larger than the 48-story tower, Union Carbide rejected the proposal because the interior offices would have been too dark. Union Carbide also did not want to build a tower on Madison Avenue because this would have forced the shops to be placed along Park Avenue, away from the shopping district on Madison Avenue.

A version of the base-and-tower plan was ultimately selected. It called for a 41-story, 800,000 square feet (74,000 m^{2}) office building along Park Avenue, with a 13-story section along Madison Avenue, to be completed by 1958. In July 1956, Bunshaft and de Blois increased the size of the building to 52 floors; the tower's cost increased to $46 million. While designing the offices, the architects created a full-sized model of an office at one corner of the building, which allowed them to experiment with exterior and interior design features. SOM's design team created designs for contemporary furniture, furnishings, and graphics for the building.

==== Construction ====
Demolition of the former hotel began in early 1957 and was completed by late August. General Bronze received a contract for the stainless steel in January 1958. Work on the building's foundation was delayed slightly the following month due to a labor strike. As some materials had to be delivered by railroad, material deliveries were coordinated closely to avoid delays on the commuter rail lines entering Grand Central. Construction was complicated by the fact that there were only six railroad platforms on the upper level that extended to 47th Street, and materials had to come through these platforms. Additionally, there was no space for materials to be stored on site, requiring contractors to use staging areas that, in some cases, were several miles away. Train service was largely uninterrupted, except for one incident in which a plank fell onto a train car. Contractors worked overnight so the structural steel could be installed immediately after they were delivered via railroad.

A refrigerant compressor for an air-conditioning chiller, weighing 43,000 pounds (20,000 kg), was installed on the roof in July 1959; at the time, no other similarly heavy object had been hoisted to a higher altitude. By early 1960, the facade was nearly complete and workers were unwrapping the metal panels from their plastic packaging. The Union Carbide Building was one of several office buildings with over 1 million square feet (93,000 m^{2}) of space that were constructed in New York City during the late 1950s and early 1960s.

=== Completion and early years ===
Union Carbide had initially planned to occupy its entire building, but, by 1958, it intended to lease out some of its offices. The electronics company Magnavox leased a store, as did a Manufacturers Hanover bank branch, a florist, and a barber. Office tenants included the consultants McKinsey & Company, Reader's Digest magazine, the Stanford Research Institute, and several steel companies. The first 700 Union Carbide employees moved into the building on April 18, 1960, as the upper floors were being finished. By September 1960, the Union Carbide Building was fully occupied. Seventeen office tenants had leased the 14th through 23rd floors, and four commercial tenants occupied the ground level. Union Carbide occupied the other 41 floors, which accommodated over 4,000 employees. In total, Union Carbide leased out 27,000 square feet (2,500 m^{2}) of storefronts at an average rate of $20 per square foot ($220/m^{2}), as well as 117,000 square feet (10,900 m^{2}) of office space at an average rate of $7.50 per square foot ($80.7/m^{2}).

Union Carbide used the lobby for exhibits, such as an exhibition on the history of atoms, a showcase of school buildings, an exhibit of Japanese art, a showcase of battery-powered devices, and an exhibit on nuclear power. After Reader's Digest moved out of the building in 1963, McKinsey & Company expanded into the magazine's former offices. In the 1970s, the Japanese conglomerate C. Itoh & Co. was among the tenants leasing space in the building. The building was one of five damaged by bombings on the same day in October 1974. The Puerto Rican separatist group Fuerzas Armadas de Liberación Nacional Puertorriqueña claimed responsibility, saying they had bombed the structures to get the U.S. government to free political prisoners and recognize Puerto Rico's independence. The building continued to host exhibits in the 1970s, including a showcase of cartoons and a show about national parks in the U.S.

=== Sale ===
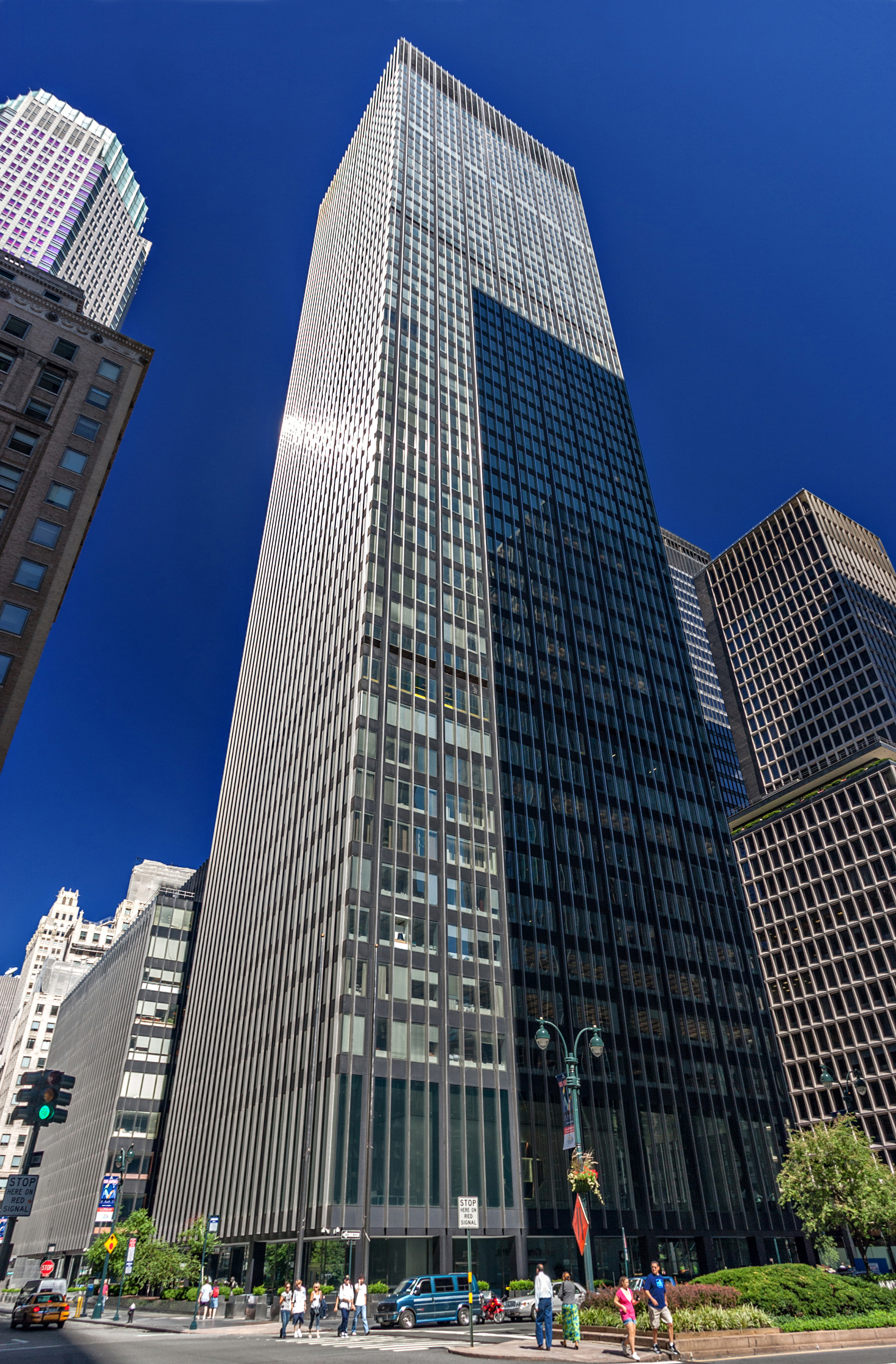
View from Park Avenue

The New York Central Railroad (which owned the site) had experienced financial decline during the 1960s, merging with the Pennsylvania Railroad in 1968 to form the Penn Central Railroad. Penn Central continued to face financial issues and failed to make mortgage payments. By late 1970, the Union Carbide Building was facing foreclosure, as were several other buildings that Penn Central owned around Grand Central Terminal. After Penn Central went bankrupt that year, the company sought to sell its properties, including the land below the Union Carbide Building. The buildings were placed for auction in October 1971. Union Carbide submitted a bid for its own building, and Corporate Properties also offered to buy the structure and nine others for $87.9 million. The proceedings were delayed for several years.

By early 1975, the Union Carbide Company was planning to move out of New York City. Union Carbide started negotiating to sell the building to a bank, Manufacturers Hanover Trust, which itself had been looking to expand from its headquarters at 350 Park Avenue. When the land lease under the Union Carbide Building expired at the end of 1975, Penn Central did not want to renew the lease because the rental income was too low. Union Carbide confirmed the next year that it would move its 3,500 employees at the building to the Union Carbide Corporate Center at Danbury, Connecticut. It had been difficult for Union Carbide to attract employees to the Park Avenue headquarters because of quality-of-life concerns in New York City, the high cost of living, and the long distances from the suburbs where many employees lived. Officials from the city and state of New York unsuccessfully tried to persuade the company to keep its offices in New York City. This was part of a trend that started in the 1960s, in which dozens of large companies moved from the city to Connecticut.

Union Carbide acquired the land from Penn Central in 1976 for $11 million and signed a letter of intent with Manufacturers Hanover the next January. Although Union Carbide was planning to move away, the transaction made it easier to sell the building, as the structure itself and its land were now under common ownership. The company leased some land under the building to the Metropolitan Transportation Authority (MTA), which operated the underlying railroad tracks. In June 1978, Manufacturers Hanover agreed to buy 270 Park Avenue for $110 million, though the sale would not be finalized until 1980. The price was to be paid over 30 years, and Manufacturers Hanover would receive an after-tax capital gain of $49 million. The space appealed to Manufacturers Hanover because of its proximity to Grand Central Terminal and because buying and renovating the existing structure was cheaper than erecting a new building. 270 Park Avenue continued to serve as the headquarters for Union Carbide until 1981.

=== Manufacturers Hanover and JPMorgan Chase ownership ===
==== 1980s and 1990s ====
Manufacturers Hanover began moving employees into 270 Park Avenue in early 1981, with plans to complete the move by the end of 1982. This timeline was then pushed back to early 1983. Because Manufacturers Hanover had sold its old headquarters at 350 Park Avenue, the firm temporarily leased its previous space at 350 Park Avenue from the new owner. After the move was complete, Manufacturers Hanover spent $75 million to renovate the building into its world headquarters. SOM designed the changes, which included removing the mezzanine level; renovating the plaza, where it added two fountains; and refurbishing of interior flooring, ceilings, and fixtures. Following the renovations, Manufacturers Hanover occupied the entire building with over 3,000 employees, with the exception of 75,000 square feet (7,000 m^{2}) on the sixth and seventh floors, which was leased to C. Itoh & Co. In 1989, Manufacturers Hanover further consolidated its operations, moving its institutional trust and agency offices from 600 Fifth Avenue to 270 Park Avenue.

Meanwhile, Grand Central Terminal had about 2 million square feet (190,000 m^{2}) of unused air rights, which its owners (a subsidiary of the former Penn Central) sought to sell off. Since the terminal was a city landmark, its owners could not use the air rights to expand the terminal; many potential development sites could not receive Grand Central's air rights because they were too far away. (Note: Typically, New York City zoning sets a maximum floor area for each land lot, after which developers must buy air rights to increase their floor area. Owners of buildings that contain less than their maximum floor area can sell air rights to developers who own adjacent sites. Without a zoning subdistrict, building owners can only transfer air rights between buildings if the sites are adjacent or across the street, and/or if the same owner owns a contiguous string of land lots between these sites. Grand Central Terminal contains less than its maximum floor area. In Penn Central Transportation Co. v. New York City (1978), the United States Supreme Court had ruled that the city government had the right to designate the terminal as a landmark, even if the designation prevented Penn Central from using its air rights.) In 1991, the New York City Planning Commission issued a report on the proposed Grand Central Subdistrict, which would allow Penn Central to transfer air rights to any building in the subdistrict. Among those sites was 270 Park Avenue, which could potentially receive 353,000 square feet (32,800 m^{2}) to expand its Madison Avenue annex by up to 12 stories. However, the building already had a floor area ratio of 17.2, more than the maximum allowed for the lot.

In 1991, Chemical Bank acquired Manufacturers Hanover and moved to 270 Park Avenue from its old headquarters across the street, 277 Park Avenue; at the time, Chemical's lease at 277 Park was expiring. As part of the move, J. Seward Johnson Jr.'s 1983 sculpture Taxi!, which had been in front of 277 Park, was moved across the street to 270 Park. Both banks occupied space in multiple buildings in New York City, though some operations were shrunk. Tishman Technologies also built trading floors for Chemical. In 1995, Chemical merged with Chase Manhattan Corporation, which moved from One Chase Manhattan Plaza (now 28 Liberty Street) the next year. The building's offices had been overcrowded even before Chase and Chemical merged, but the merger prompted Chase to plan a skyscraper at the adjacent 383 Madison Avenue (which ultimately became the Bear Stearns Building). After the merger, Chase installed new workstations to accommodate 860 traders and 500 secondary staff.

==== 2000s and 2010s ====
J.P. Morgan & Co. had merged with Chase Manhattan in 2000 to form JPMorgan Chase, which moved from 60 Wall Street. This further strained 270 Park Avenue's capacity, prompting JPMorgan Chase to lease space at 245 Park Avenue; in Newport, Jersey City; and at 1166 Avenue of the Americas. J.P. Morgan & Co. sold 60 Wall to Deutsche Bank and had originally planned to move to 270 Park by early 2002; the move was accelerated after Deutsche Bank Building was damaged in the September 11 attacks in 2001. The building served as JPMorgan Chase's world headquarters. The building had mechanical backup facilities, allowing it to remain powered during emergencies such as the Northeast blackout of 2003, when all other buildings on Park Avenue went dark. After acquiring Bear Stearns in 2008, JPMorgan Chase moved its investment banking division into 383 Madison.

A 2011 renovation—the most extensive in the building's history—added a green roof, cooling systems, and a rainwater collection tank, leading the U.S. Green Building Council to certify the structure as LEED Platinum in 2012. JPMorgan Chase described the renovation as "the largest green renovation of a headquarters building in the world". By the late 2010s, the building accommodated 6,000 employees in a space originally designed for 3,500. By 2014, JPMorgan Chase was looking to develop a new corporate campus in the Hudson Yards development, moving from 270 Park and 383 Madison. The bank dropped its plans after failing to secure tax exemptions from the city and state governments. In 2016, SL Green Realty proposed that JPMorgan Chase swap 270 Park and 383 Madison with One Vanderbilt, a skyscraper that SL Green was building five blocks south. Though JPMorgan Chase considered the proposal, the two firms never entered into formal negotiations.

The New York City Landmarks Preservation Commission (LPC) denied a request in 2013 to designate 270 Park Avenue as a landmark, which would have prevented the structure's demolition without the commission's approval. As part of the Midtown East rezoning in the 2010s, the LPC designated twelve buildings in the Terminal City area as city landmarks in 2016 but again declined to consider protecting 270 Park Avenue. An LPC spokesperson said that several buildings by SOM were already landmarks, including the Manufacturers Trust Company Building and 28 Liberty Street, as were several International-style buildings in the area, including the Seagram Building and Lever House. Except for Citigroup Center, the 12 landmarks designated in 2016 were built before World War II. Landmarks were required to be at least 30 years old, and the Union Carbide Building had become eligible for landmark status in the 1990s.

=== Demolition ===
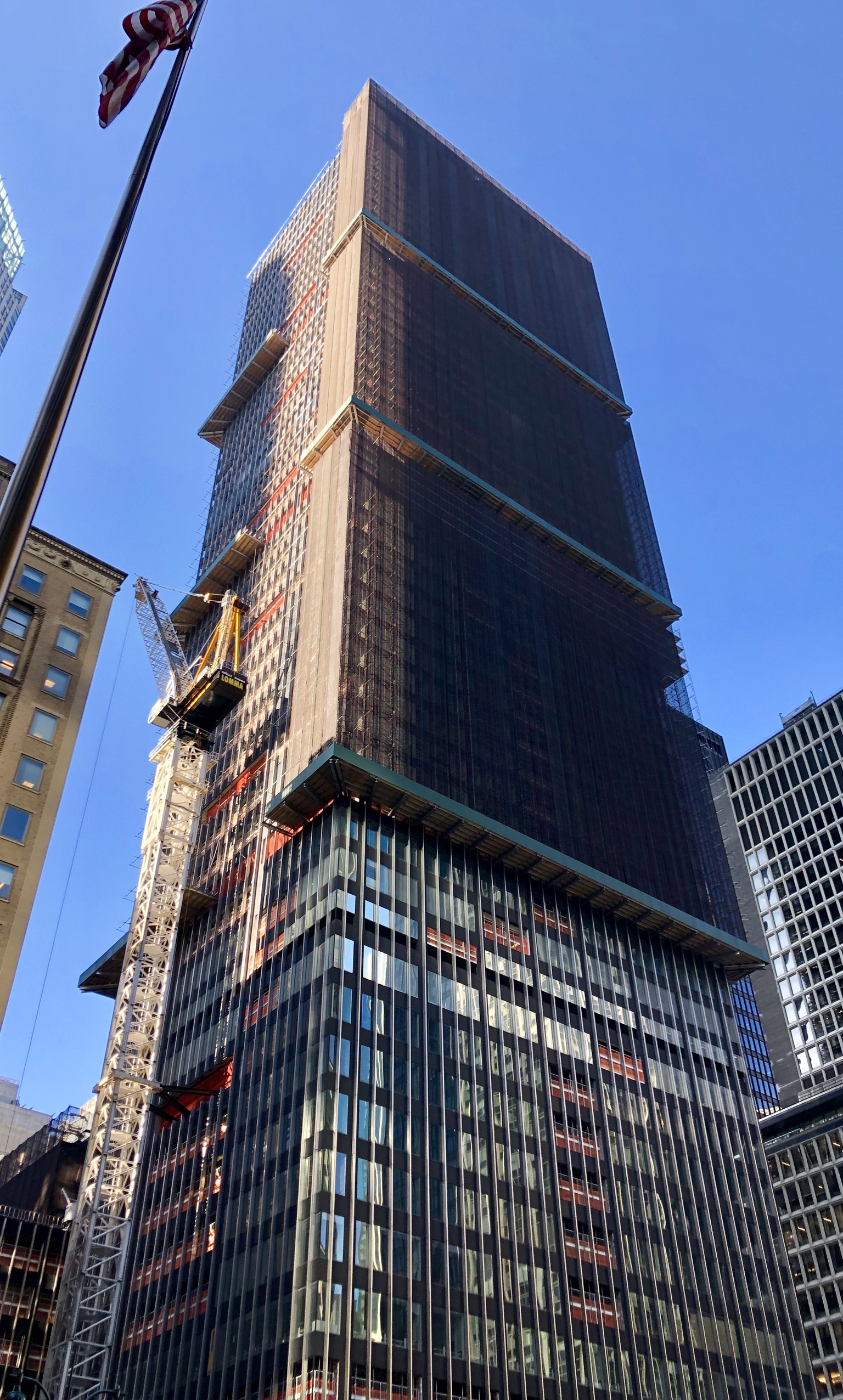
Demolition progress in late 2019

The building's demolition was precipitated by the Midtown East rezoning, which permitted a larger structure on the site. To obtain zoning approval for such a building, JPMorgan Chase bought 680,000 square feet (63,000 m^{2}) of air rights from Grand Central Terminal and 50,000 square feet (4,600 m^{2}) from St. Bartholomew's Church. These air rights were transferred to 270 Park Avenue's site, increasing the maximum size of the development allowed on that site. In February 2018, as part of the first major project announced as part of the rezoning, JPMorgan Chase announced it would replace the former Union Carbide Building with another skyscraper. The announcement prompted objections from the architectural community. The American Institute of Architects' New York affiliate expressed concern that the demolition and reconstruction of 270 Park Avenue would be energy-intensive, especially as the building had achieved LEED status less than a decade earlier. Preservationists attempted once more to protect the building, but the city government had already expressed its support for JPMorgan Chase's new building. Curbed described the Union Carbide Building in 2018 as being among New York City's most endangered structures.

In January 2019, JPMorgan Chase applied to the New York City Department of Buildings for a demolition permit. Howard I. Shapiro & Associates was hired to demolish the building. That May, the New York City Council unanimously approved JPMorgan Chase's new headquarters. To secure approvals, JPMorgan Chase was required to fund public improvements for the area, including repairs to Grand Central's train shed directly under the site, as well as new public space in its new building. The new building would be almost twice the height of the Union Carbide Building at 1,388 feet (423 m) tall. This raised concerns that the new building would require deeper foundations that could interfere with the MTA's East Side Access tunnels and Grand Central Terminal's rail yards.

The MTA and JPMorgan Chase signed an agreement in July 2019, in which the bank agreed to ensure that the destruction of 270 Park Avenue would not disrupt the timeline of East Side Access. The MTA had planned to repair the Grand Central Terminal train shed's concrete and steel as part of the 2020–2024 MTA Capital Program. The first portion of the train shed to be repaired was underneath 270 Park Avenue, since the agency wished to conduct the repair work alongside new developments where possible. Due to the building's proximity to numerous skyscrapers, it could not be demolished by implosion or via wrecking ball. Instead, after hazardous materials were removed, the building was to be deconstructed in pieces.

Scaffolding had been erected around the building by late 2019. All decorations, windows, doors, and other fixtures were removed before demolition. Workers also had to conduct asbestos abatement while demolishing the building. The building had been deconstructed to the 30th story in October 2020, when an electrical fire forced a temporary evacuation of the site. The building's demolition was completed in mid-2021. At the time, the Union Carbide Building was the tallest building in the world to be voluntarily demolished, overtaking the Singer Building, which had been demolished in 1968. (Note: In 2023, it was surpassed by the AXA Tower in Singapore, which was 770 feet (230 m) tall.) It was also the third-tallest building ever to be destroyed, after the Twin Towers of the World Trade Center, which collapsed following the September 11, 2001, terrorist attacks.

== Impact ==
=== Reception ===
When the building was completed, Architectural Record said that "the detailing is a further step in the direction of simplification and clarity of statement" compared to previous designs by SOM. New York Times critic Ada Louise Huxtable, writing in 1960, said that 270 Park Avenue, 1271 Avenue of the Americas, and 28 Liberty Street all had a "still too-rare esthetic excellence". The Fifth Avenue Association called the Union Carbide Building the best edifice constructed on Park Avenue between 1960 and 1961. The design was frequently likened to the Seagram Building, and a writer for The Wall Street Journal said: "There is no doubt that glass has been firmly associated with the post-World War II luxury office building." After Chase and Chemical's merger in 1995, the journalist David W. Dunlap wrote that the Seagram Building, Lever House, and the Union Carbide Building along Park Avenue "epitomized New York at the peak of its economic might and worldwide prowess". Anthony Paletta of The Wall Street Journal said in 2013 that "the Union Carbide Building is a bracing exemplar of postwar corporate modernism".

Although the Union Carbide Building was similar in scale to the Seagram Building several blocks north, critics regarded Union Carbide as significantly bulkier. Architectural Forum criticized the plaza on Park Avenue, saying: "While one or two setbacks of this sort along a street might offer welcome relief, an entire street of variously set-back buildings is likely to be an urban disaster." The architectural historian William Jordy wrote in 1970 that "the Seagram is a greater architectural achievement than Union Carbide" when one compared "the difference between the architecture of genius and the best of the architecture of bureaucracy" on Park Avenue. The author Eric Nash wrote that "the Union Carbide is flawed architecturally", with an uninviting plaza and a "derivative" facade. According to the author Dirk Stichweh, the Union Carbide design was neither as good nor as widely acclaimed as the Seagram design. The historian Carol Herselle Krinsky wrote in 1988 that the "rather dour Union Carbide building commands respect rather than enthusiasm" and noted that the recessed facade on Park Avenue had interrupted the streetscape there.

When the building's demolition was announced, Justin Davidson of New York magazine characterized the structure as "appearing gracious and vibrant, the incarnation of white-collar America". Alexandra Lange of Curbed wrote that 270 Park Avenue had been "a superlative example of what Ada Louise Huxtable named 'The Park Avenue School of Architecture' in 1957: sleek, shiny buildings that to her seemed like the city shaking off masonry, somnolence, the past, and marching up Park into the future." The architect Annabelle Selldorf said in 2020: "The Landmarks Preservation Commission can only protect so many buildings, which means some children are left behind, and Union Carbide is one of them. But it's a loss." The journalist Roberta Gratz wrote: "The planned destruction of 270 Park exemplifies how a vital aspect of the urbanism on which this city has evolved and excelled over decades is now being dangerously eroded." Similarly, Reese Lewis of the Brooklyn Rail said in 2024 that, despite the Union Carbide Building's significance, it had been demolished "at a moment when it is so inappropriate to do so".

=== Zoning influence ===
The presence of the building's plazas helped influence the 1961 Zoning Resolution, a zoning ordinance that allowed New York City developers to increase their edifices' maximum floor areas in exchange for adding open space in front of their buildings. This was in sharp contrast to the "wedding cake" model of the 1916 Zoning Resolution, which had required setbacks at regular intervals. Before the 1961 zoning codes had been implemented, 270 Park Avenue was one of several New York City buildings that had been erected as a slab behind a plaza; other such buildings included the Seagram Building, 1271 Avenue of the Americas, and 28 Liberty Street. Twenty acres (8.1 ha) of plazas were built in New York City in the decade after the zoning-code revision.

== See also ==
- List of tallest buildings in New York City
- List of tallest buildings in the United States
