= 270 Park Avenue (2025–present) =

Skyscraper in Manhattan, New York

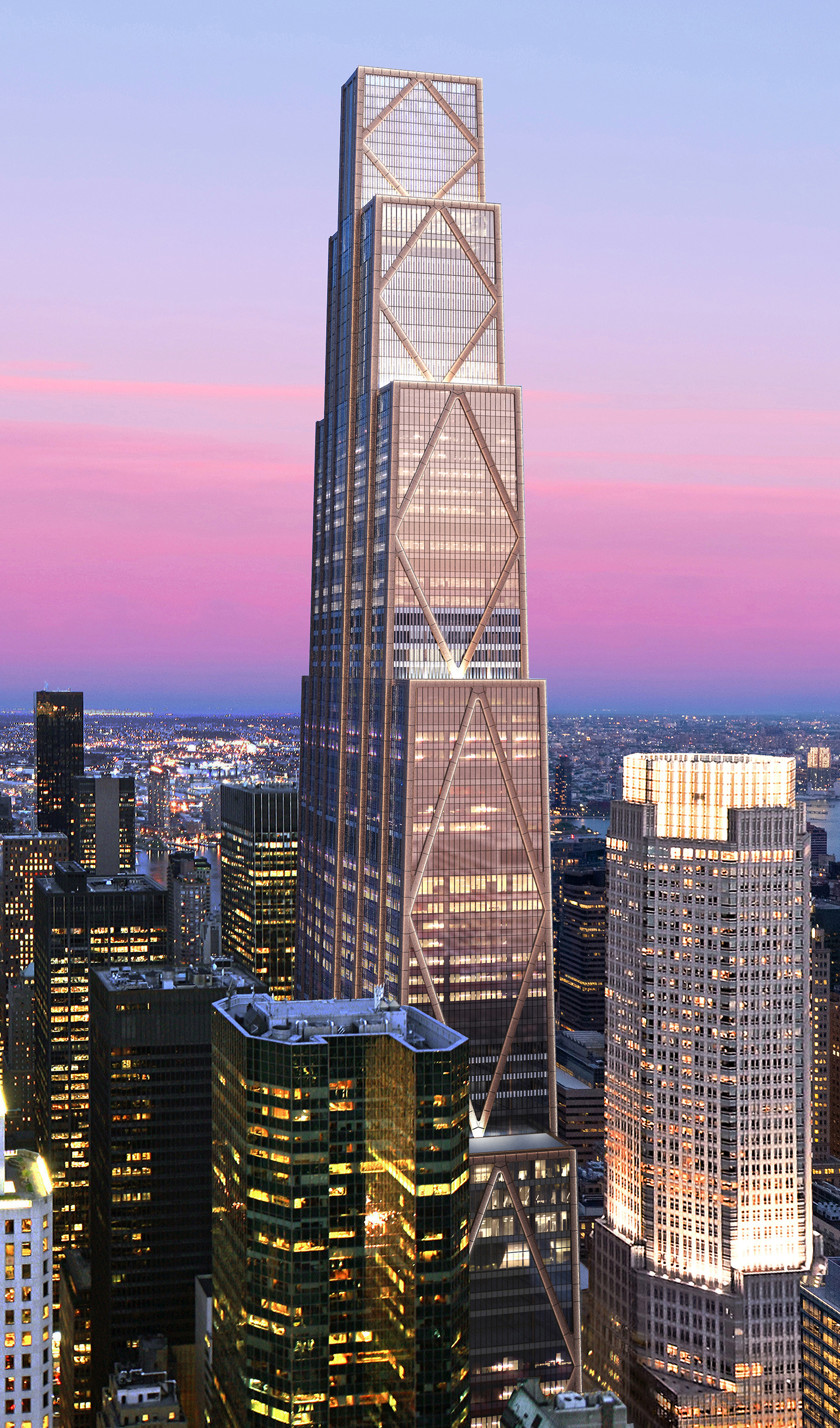
- Artistic impression of 270 Park Avenue
- Alternative names: JPMorganChase Tower

General information
- Status: Completed
- Type: Office building
- Architectural style: Structural expressionism; Neo-Art Deco
- Location: 270 Park Avenue; New York, NY 10017; U.S.
- Coordinates: 40.7560°N 73.9760°W
- Construction started: April 8, 2021
- Completed: August 25, 2025
- Opened: October 21, 2025

Height
- Height: 1,388 ft (423 m)

Technical details
- Floor count: 60
- Floor area: 2,500,000 sq ft (230,000 m^{2})

Design and construction
- Architect: Foster + Partners
- Architecture firm: AAI Architects, P.C.
- Engineer: Jaros, Baum & Bolles (MEP)
- Structural engineer: Severud Associates
- Main contractor: Tishman Construction

270 Park Avenue, also known as the JPMorganChase Tower, is a supertall skyscraper on the East Side of the Midtown neighborhood of Manhattan in New York City. Since October 21, 2025, it has served as the global headquarters of JPMorgan Chase, the largest banking institution in the United States. It is the sixth-tallest building in New York and the 35th-tallest building in the world.

Designed by the firm of Foster + Partners with an estimated construction cost of $3 billion, the skyscraper rises 1,388 feet (423 m). Formally topped off in November 2023 and occupied beginning in August 2025, the tower replaces the 52-story Union Carbide Building, built in 1960 and demolished in 2021. The older building was originally the headquarters of American chemical company Union Carbide and was later the headquarters of JPMorgan Chase.

== Site ==
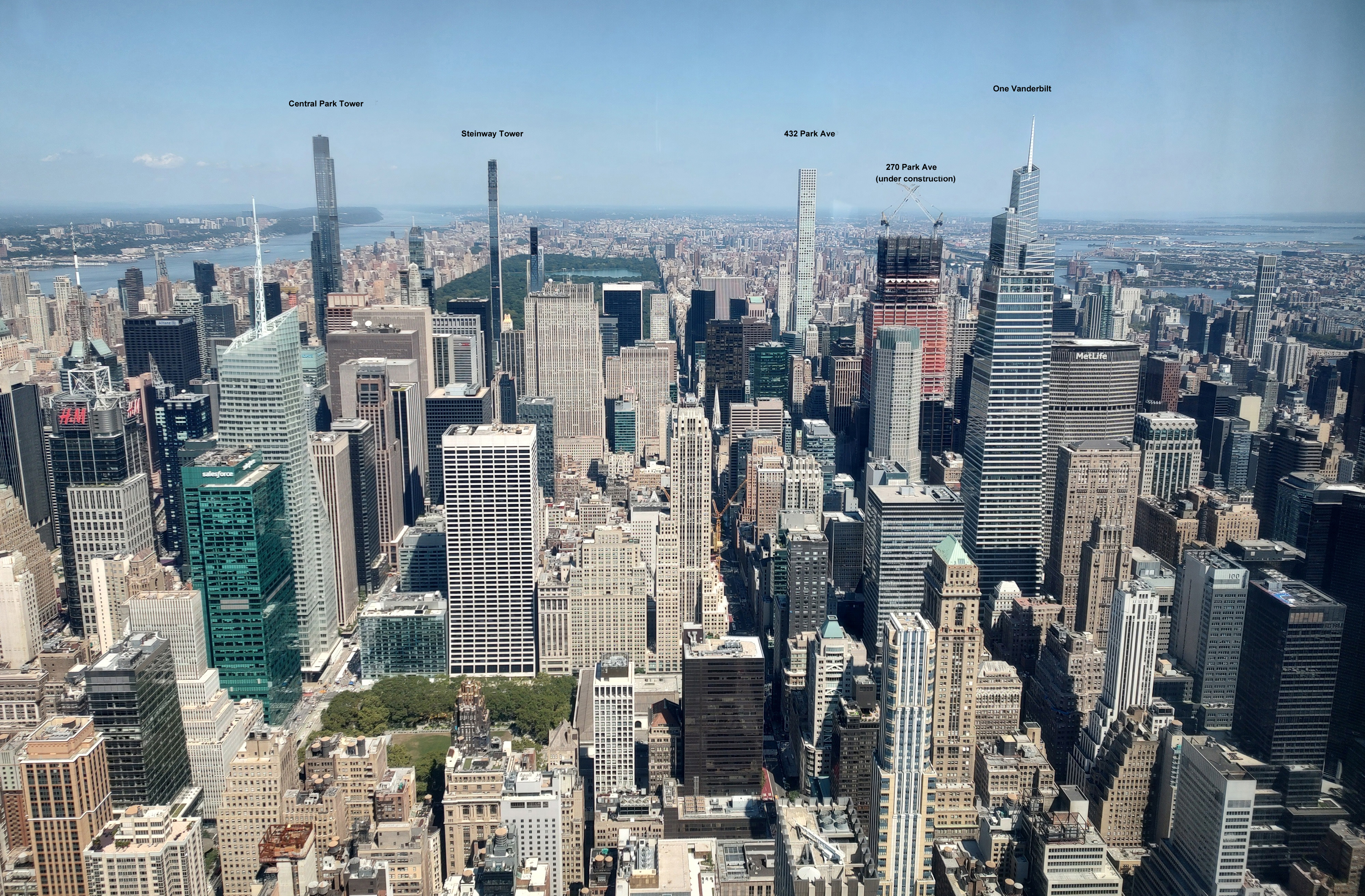
Midtown Manhattan, looking north from the Empire State Building in September 2023

Located in New York City's Midtown Manhattan neighborhood, 270 Park Avenue occupies the entire city block bounded by Madison Avenue to the west, 48th Street to the north, Park Avenue to the east, and 47th Street to the south. The lot measures about 80,000 square feet (7,400 m^{2}) with a frontage of 200 feet (61 m) on each avenue and 400 feet (120 m) on each street. There is a public plaza at ground level.

The lot is part of Terminal City, the area that developed rapidly after the 1913 completion of the largely underground Grand Central Terminal. The buildings erected in the following years included office buildings such as the Chanin Building, Bowery Savings Bank Building and New York Central Building, and hotels such as the Biltmore, Commodore, Waldorf Astoria, and Summit. The site of 270 Park Avenue was occupied by a six-building complex, the Hotel Marguery, which opened in 1917 and was developed by Charles V. Paterno. The stone-clad hotel was 12 stories high and designed in the Renaissance Revival style. By 1920, the area had become what The New York Times called "a great civic centre".

The Hotel Marguery was replaced by the 52-story Union Carbide Building, the first structure to occupy the entire block, which opened in 1960. The building eventually became JPMorgan Chase's global headquarters. Among the site's current neighbors are the old New York Mercantile Library and 400 Madison Avenue to the west; Tower 49 to the northwest; 277 Park Avenue to the east; 245 Park Avenue to the southeast; and 383 Madison Avenue to the south.

== Architecture ==
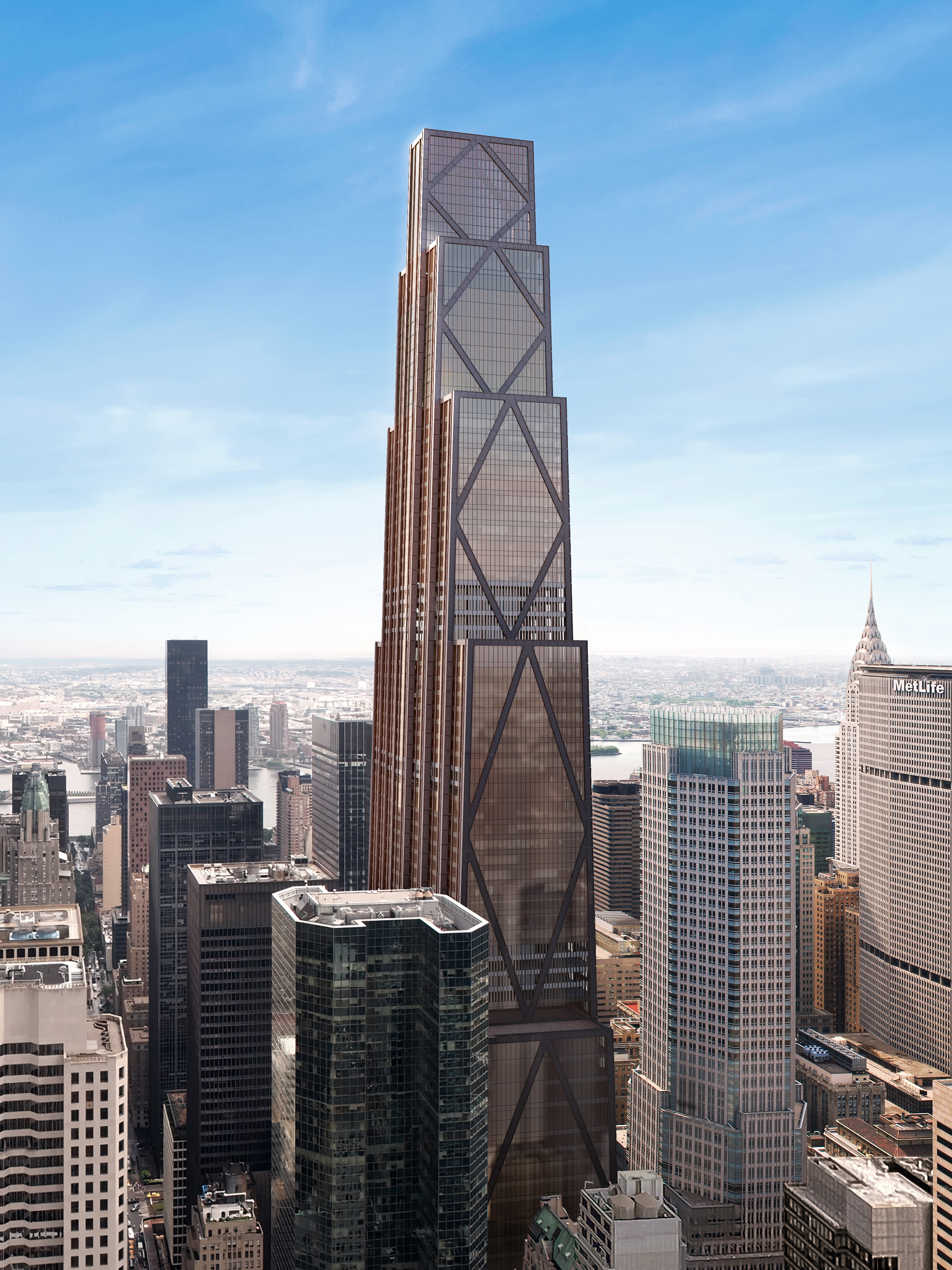
Artistic impression of the new 270 Park Avenue tower

Foster and Partners designed the building, which is 1,388 feet (423 m) tall and rises to 60 stories. The design team also included Adamson Associates as architect of record; Jaros, Baum & Bolles as MEP engineer; Vishaan Chakrabarti as Collaborating Architect; Gensler as workplace designer; and Severud Associates as structural engineer. Gensler, Studios Architecture, and Skidmore, Owings & Merrill designed the spaces inside.

To comply with city legislation, which bans the use of natural gas in all new buildings constructed after 2027, the structure is powered entirely by hydroelectric energy. Ninety-seven percent of materials from the old building were creatively reused, recycled, or otherwise diverted from landfills, and the new building uses mostly recycled steel in its superstructure. A writer for The Architect's Newspaper stated in 2024 that, although 270 Park Avenue was advertised as having zero-energy operations, the building's construction had involved large amounts of embedded emissions.

=== Lower stories ===
Just outside the building are public plazas facing Madison and Park Avenues. Within the Madison Avenue plaza is the stone artwork A Parallel Nature by Maya Lin, which is designed to resemble the bedrock under Manhattan. A Parallel Nature consists of 239 pieces of Vermont granite, which are hung from steel brackets and arranged in two 59-by-55-foot (18 by 17 m) sections of wall. There are plantings and water features within the walls themselves and at the base of each wall. Ken Smith designed a small garden next to Lin's artwork. The soffit under the building, overhanging the plaza, consists of circular lights similar in design to those of Marcel Breuer's 945 Madison Avenue building further uptown.

There are 24 massive columns at the base, which carry the building above an 80-foot-high (24 m) lobby. The lobby includes Gerhard Richter's painted-aluminum artworks Color Chase I and Color Chase II. Within the lobby is Wind Dance, a large bronze flagpole designed by the building's architect Norman Foster. Air is expelled from the flagpole's pinnacle, holding up an American flag. Refik Anadol's artwork Living Building uses artificial intelligence to illuminate the light fixtures around the elevator banks in specific patterns. The lobby walls are made of travertine and are fluted.

=== Upper stories ===
Above the lobby is a series of setbacks to the west and east, tapering to a pinnacle. The setbacks create seven rectangular masses of varying sizes, a shape also used in other postmodernist buildings. The building has 2.5 million square feet (230,000 m^{2}) of usable space. The interior fits 15,000 employees and contains a food hall, a penthouse conference center, a fitness center, and large spaces illuminated by natural lights. The floor plates can be configured in several layouts. The floor plate are large, column-free spaces; this required constructing large trusses under each floor plate, which used more material compared to a similarly-sized building with interior columns.

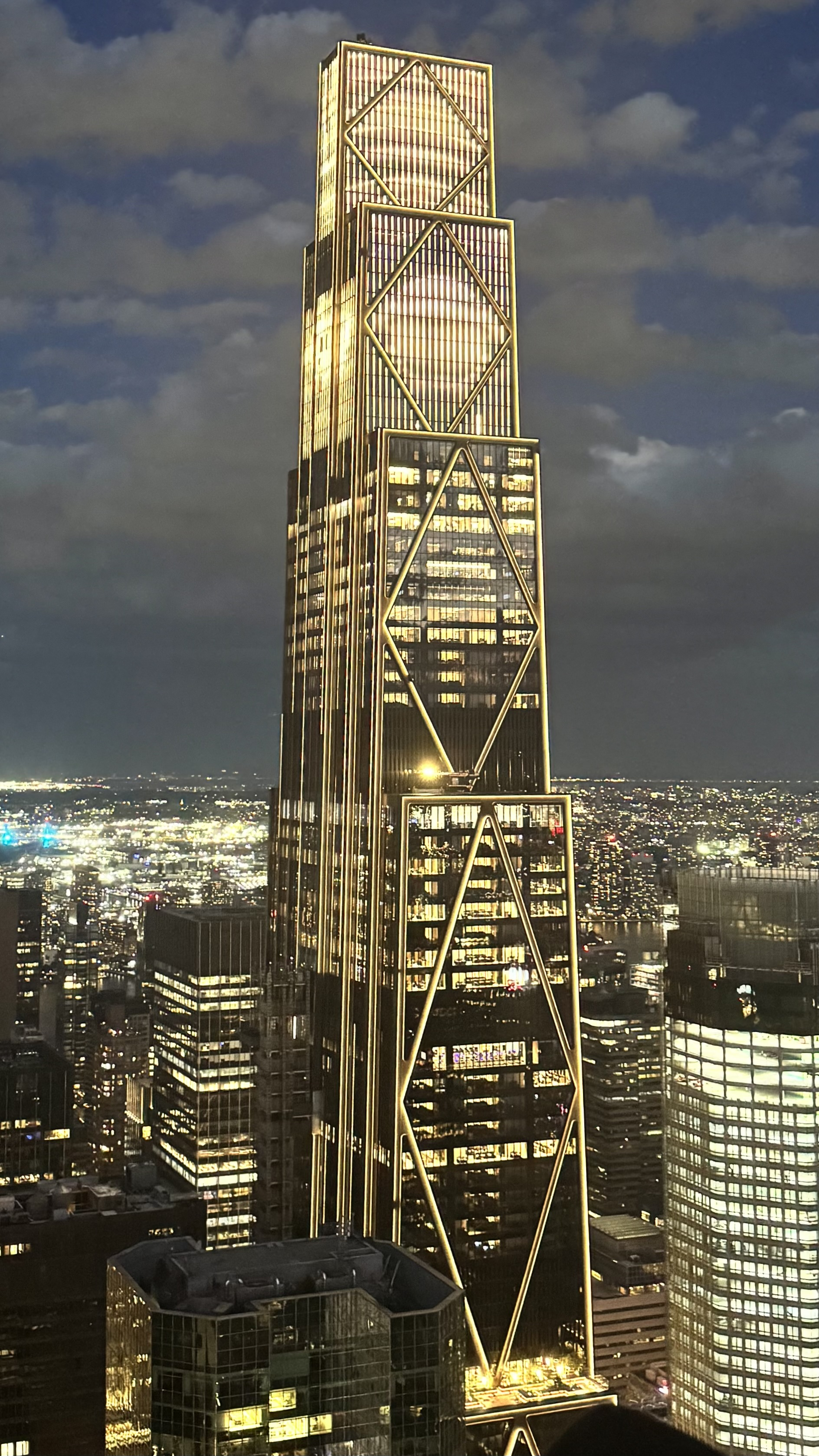
The light display at 270 Park Avenue at night, May 2026.

At night, the building is illuminated by a piece of light art, Leo Villareal's Celestial Passage. This work consists of 181,200 panels measuring 1 by 6 inches (25 by 152 mm) across, which can be illuminated a different color. Portions of the light fixture extend along the sides of the building, running approximately 750 feet (230 m) from the 29th floor to the spire, and the facade above the top two setbacks is covered by lights on all sides. The building can illuminate in different patterns but, by law, must be shut off by midnight. The lights can be seen in Brooklyn and Queens across the East River, but are not visible from the inside.

== History ==
=== Planning ===
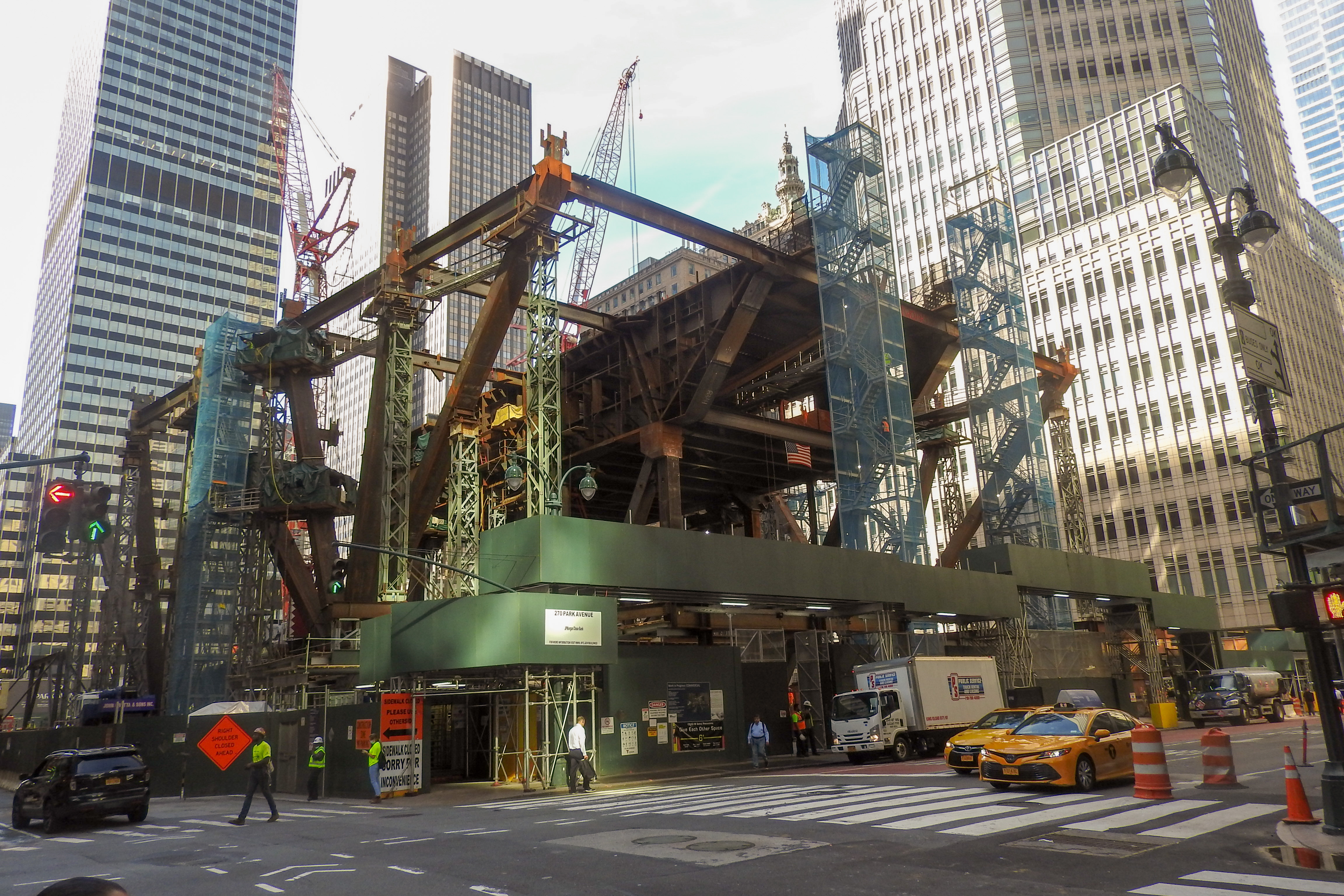
The base under construction (June 2021)

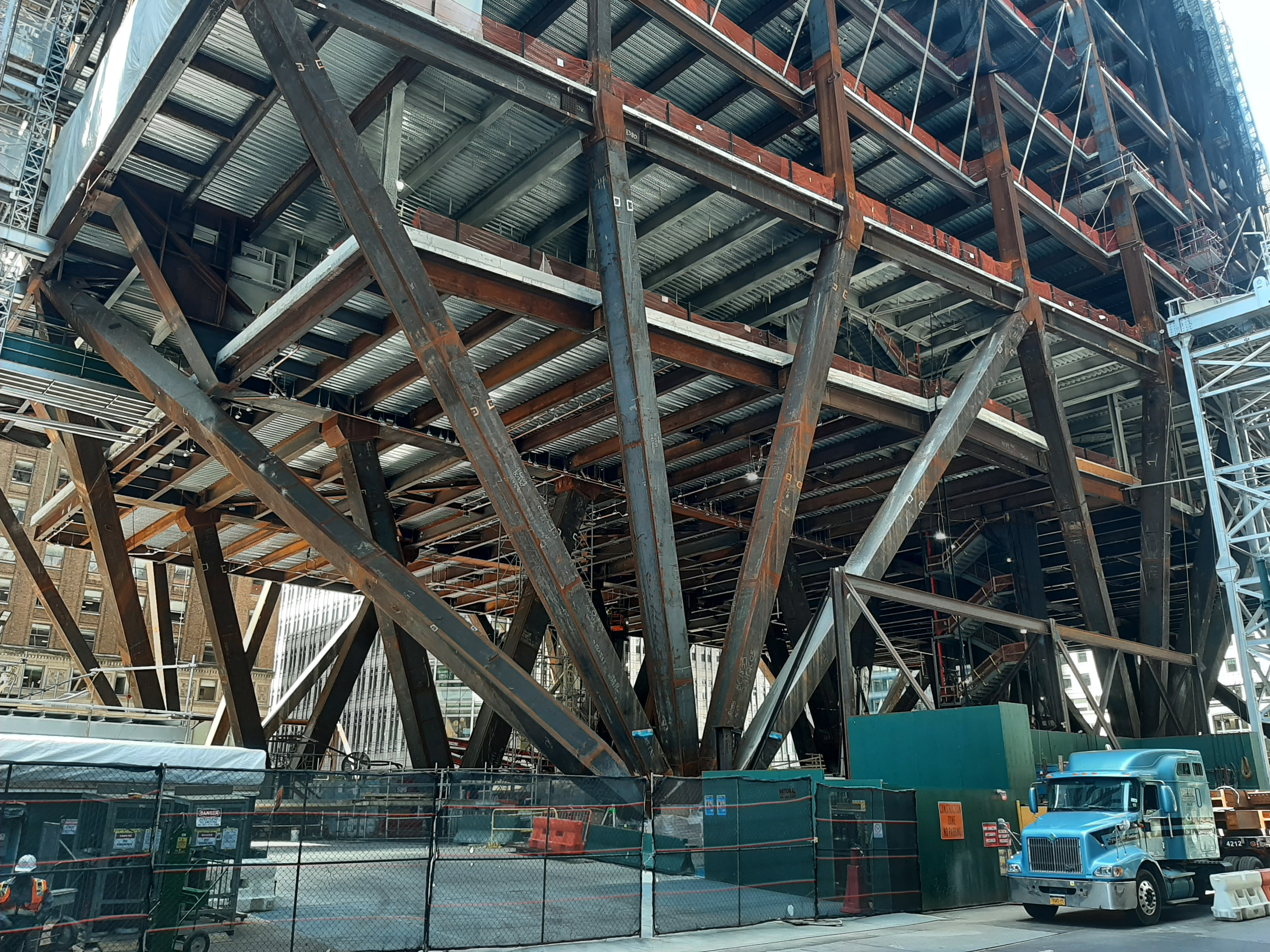
The view from 48th Street (May 2022)

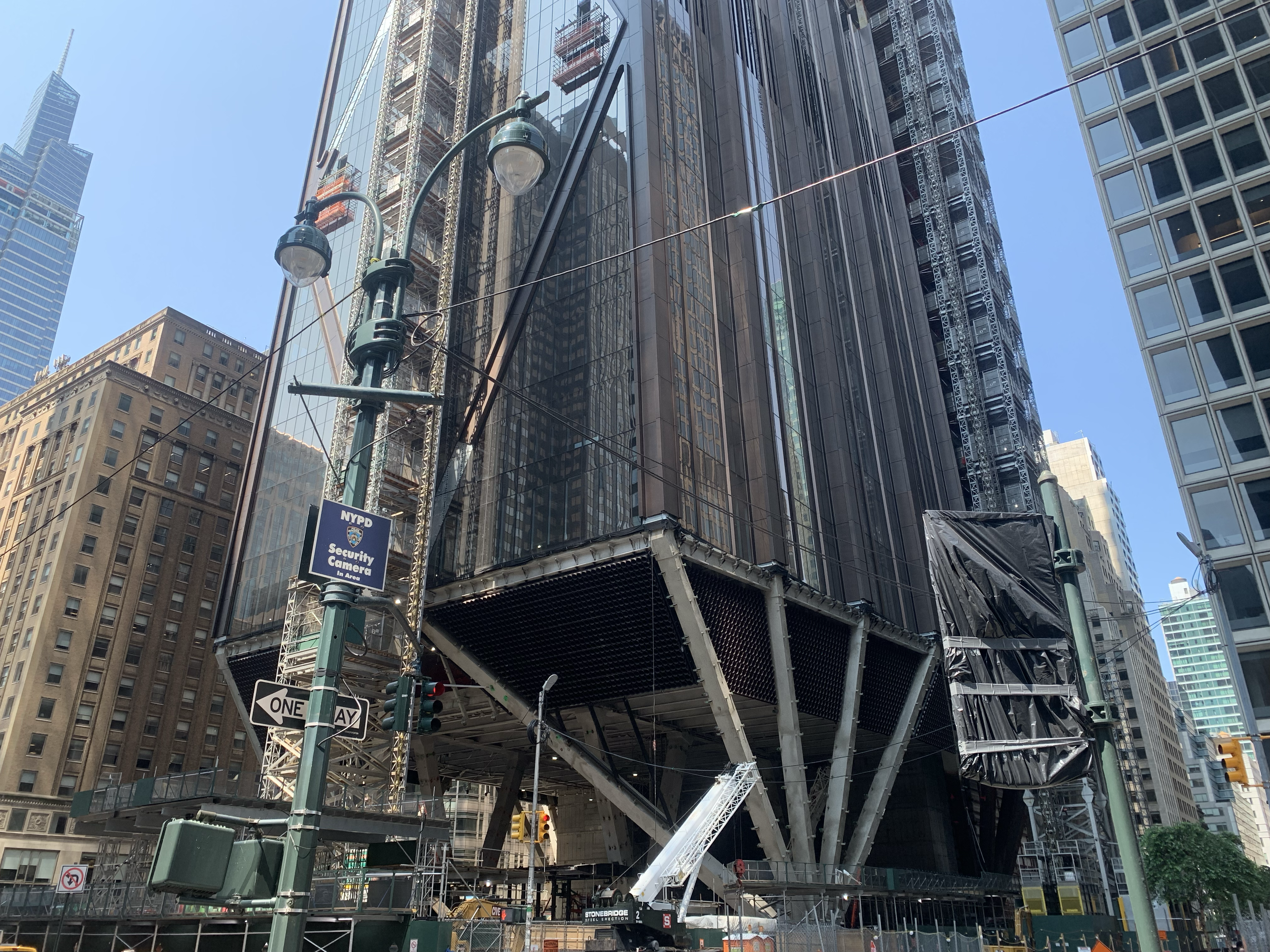
The view from Park Avenue (August 2023)

In February 2018, JPMorgan announced it would demolish the former Union Carbide Building to make way for a structure that would be up to 1,200 feet tall. This was the first major project to be announced as part of the Midtown East rezoning in the 2010s. The former building became the tallest voluntarily demolished building in the world at the time, overtaking the previous record-holder Singer Building that was demolished in 1968. The replacement 1,388-foot (423 m), 70-story headquarters would have space for 15,000 employees. Tishman Construction Corporation would be the construction manager for the project.

To build the larger structure, JPMorgan purchased hundreds of thousands of square feet of air rights from nearby St. Bartholomew's Episcopal Church as well as from Michael Dell's MSD Capital, the owner of the air rights above Grand Central Terminal. In October 2018, JPMorgan announced that British architectural firm Foster + Partners would design the new building. The plans for the new building had grown to 1,400 feet (430 m), though the zoning envelope allowed for a structure as high as 1,566 feet (477 m). However, this also raised concerns that the taller building would require deeper foundations that could interfere with the Metropolitan Transportation Authority's East Side Access tunnels and the Grand Central Terminal's rail yards, which are directly underneath 270 Park Avenue.

In May 2019, the New York City Council unanimously approved JPMorgan's new headquarters. In order to secure approvals, JPMorgan was required to contribute $40 million to a district-wide improvement fund and incorporate a new 10,000 square feet (930 m^{2}) privately owned public space plaza in front of the tower. After pressure from Manhattan Borough President Gale Brewer and City Council member Keith Powers, JPMorgan also agreed to fund numerous upgrades to the public realm surrounding the building, including improvements to Grand Central's train shed and a new entrance to the station at 48th Street. The MTA had planned to repair the Grand Central Terminal train shed's concrete and steel as part of the 2020–2024 MTA Capital Program. The first portion of the train shed to be repaired was underneath 270 Park Avenue, since the agency wished to conduct the repair work alongside new developments where possible.

=== Construction ===
In July 2019, JPMorgan signed an agreement with MTA in which the bank guaranteed that the demolition of 270 Park Avenue would not delay work on East Side Access. That month, scaffolding was wrapped around the tower and podium structure on the Madison Avenue side of the building, the first step in an anticipated 18-month demolition effort. But by late December 2020, only the podium structure had been demolished. Still, parts of the new superstructure were assembled on the Madison Avenue side, and the following month saw the assembly of the new structure's first steel beams. Demolition of the main tower was completed by April 2021; the entire demolition effort wrapped up in June.

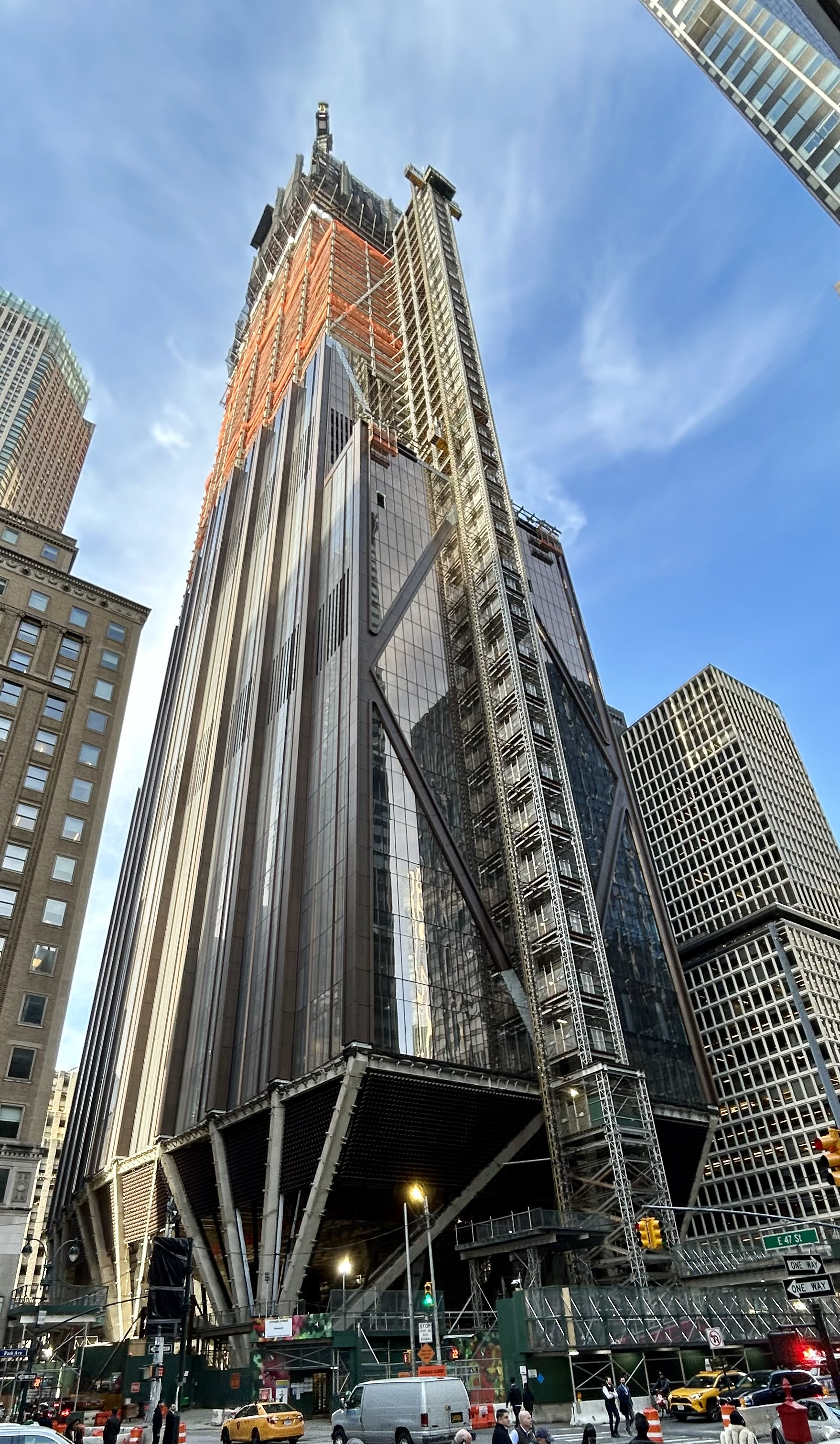
The view from Park Ave (November 2023)

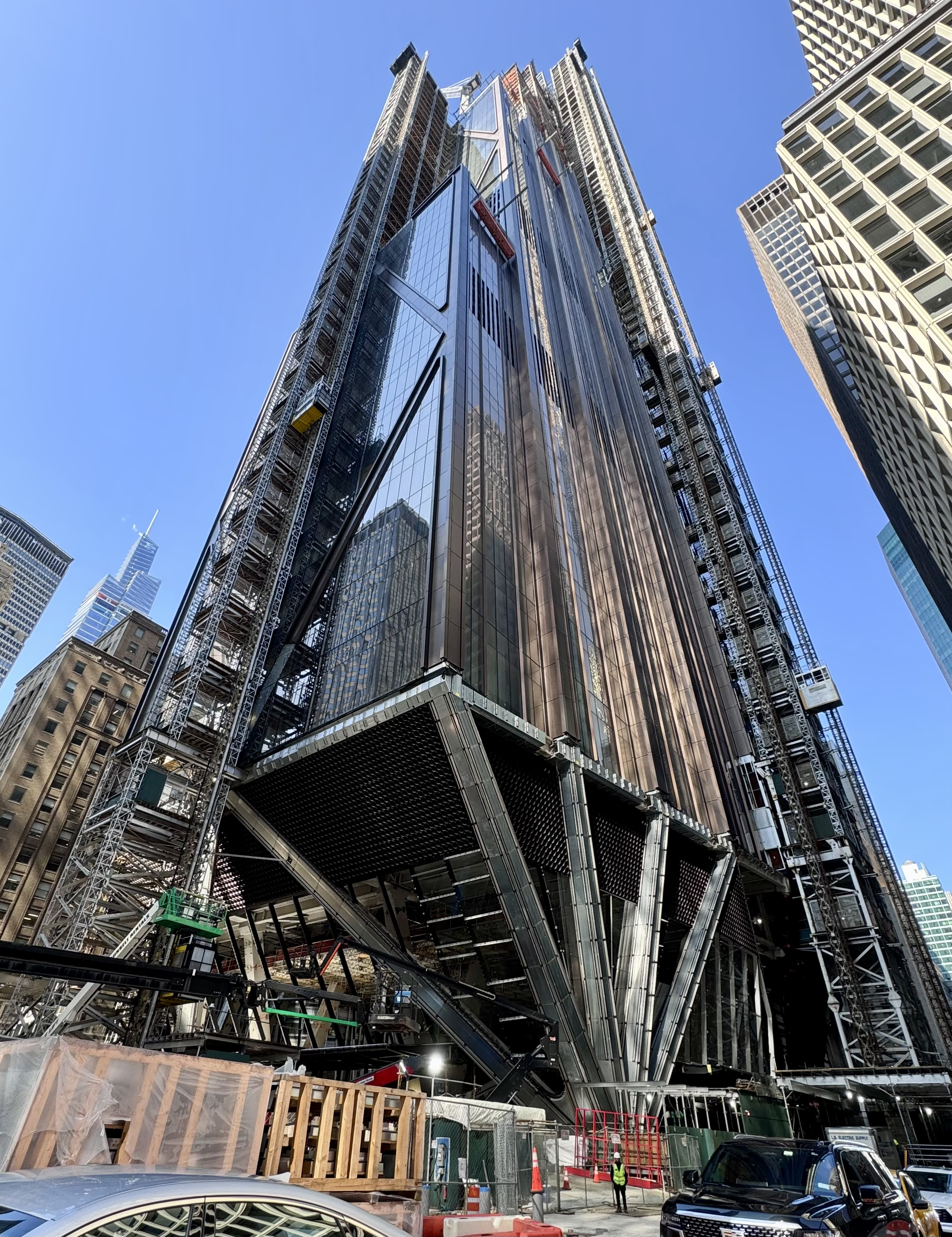
The view from park Ave and 48th St (March 2024)

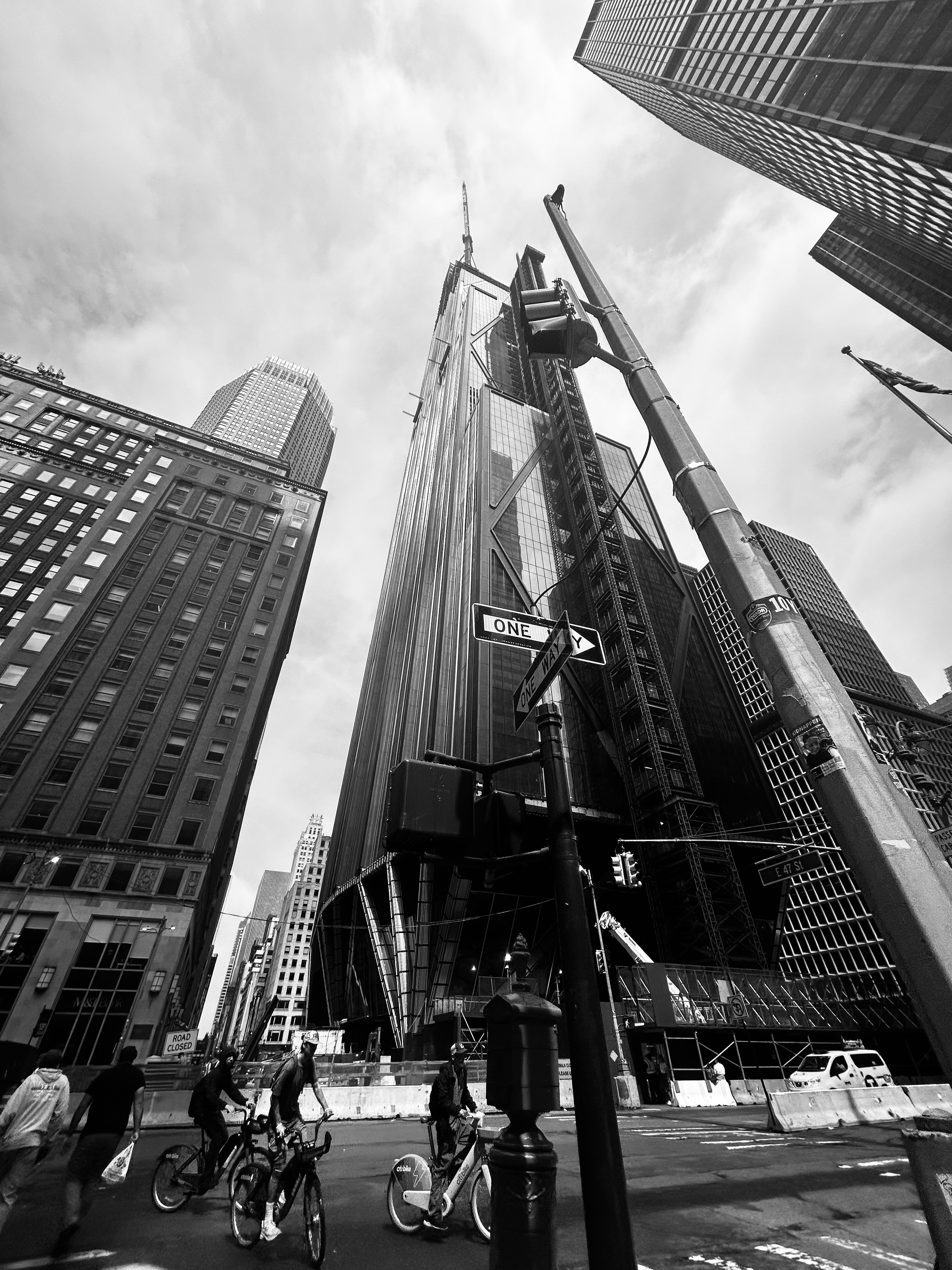
The view from Park Ave and East 47th St (May 2024)

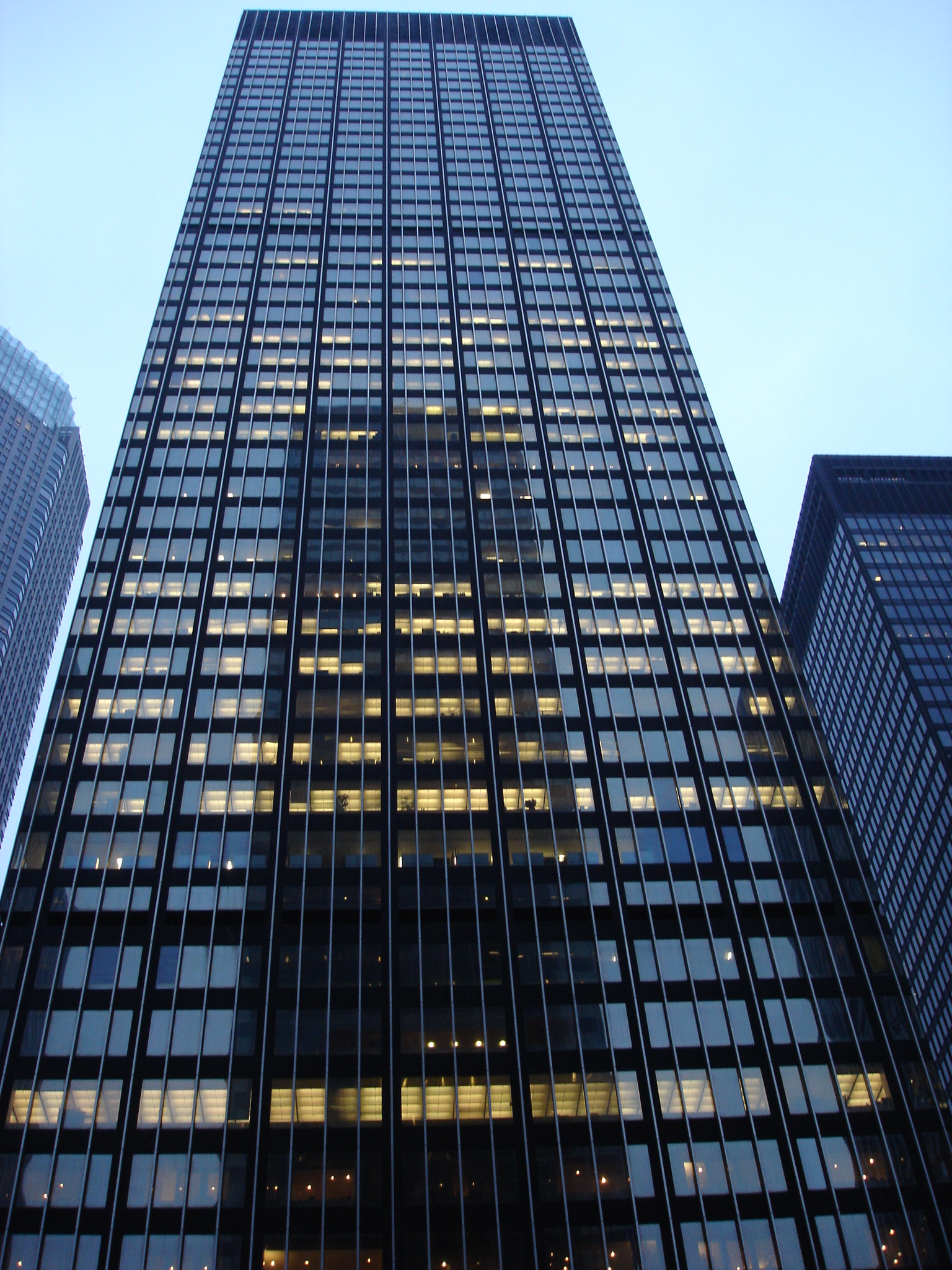
Union Carbide Building

This allowed workers to begin building support columns in the base across the entire site. By the end of the year, cranes and construction elevators had been built. In April 2022, JPMorgan CEO Jamie Dimon announced that he would further consolidate the company's New York City offices at 270 Park Avenue, since half of the staff would be able to work from home at least part of the time. In the first five months of 2023, construction reached the first two setbacks and rose above the height of the Union Carbide Building. Work was temporarily suspended after a construction worker fell to his death from the 12th floor on March 24, 2023. As of 2023, the building was estimated to be completed in 2025. By late September construction had reached the fourth of the five tiers.

There was a topping-out ceremony for the building on November 20, 2023. This involved a beam being welded in place at the top of the fourth tier, with "the crown to be topped out toward the very end of the year". In December 2023, New York YIMBY predicted that the building would be architecturally topped-out by the following month; this had occurred by February 2024. Outside cladding work proceeded on the base columns as well as the walls, the Park Avenue side being done before the Madison Avenue side. In late August the facade work reached the top of the structure. By the end of 2024 the tower crane had been removed although the construction elevator remained in place on 48th Street, with interior and exterior work continuing in preparation for occupancy in 2025. The superstructure and facade was essentially completed by April 2025. JPMorgan began moving employees to the building on August 25, 2025, as part of a multi-phased relocation into the building. The skyscraper was planned to formally open that October, and it had a formal opening ceremony on October 21, 2025. JP Morgan has not disclosed a definitive or official construction cost for 270 Park Avenue. Cost estimates are variously cited at $3 billion, $4 billion, and $6 billion.

== Reception ==
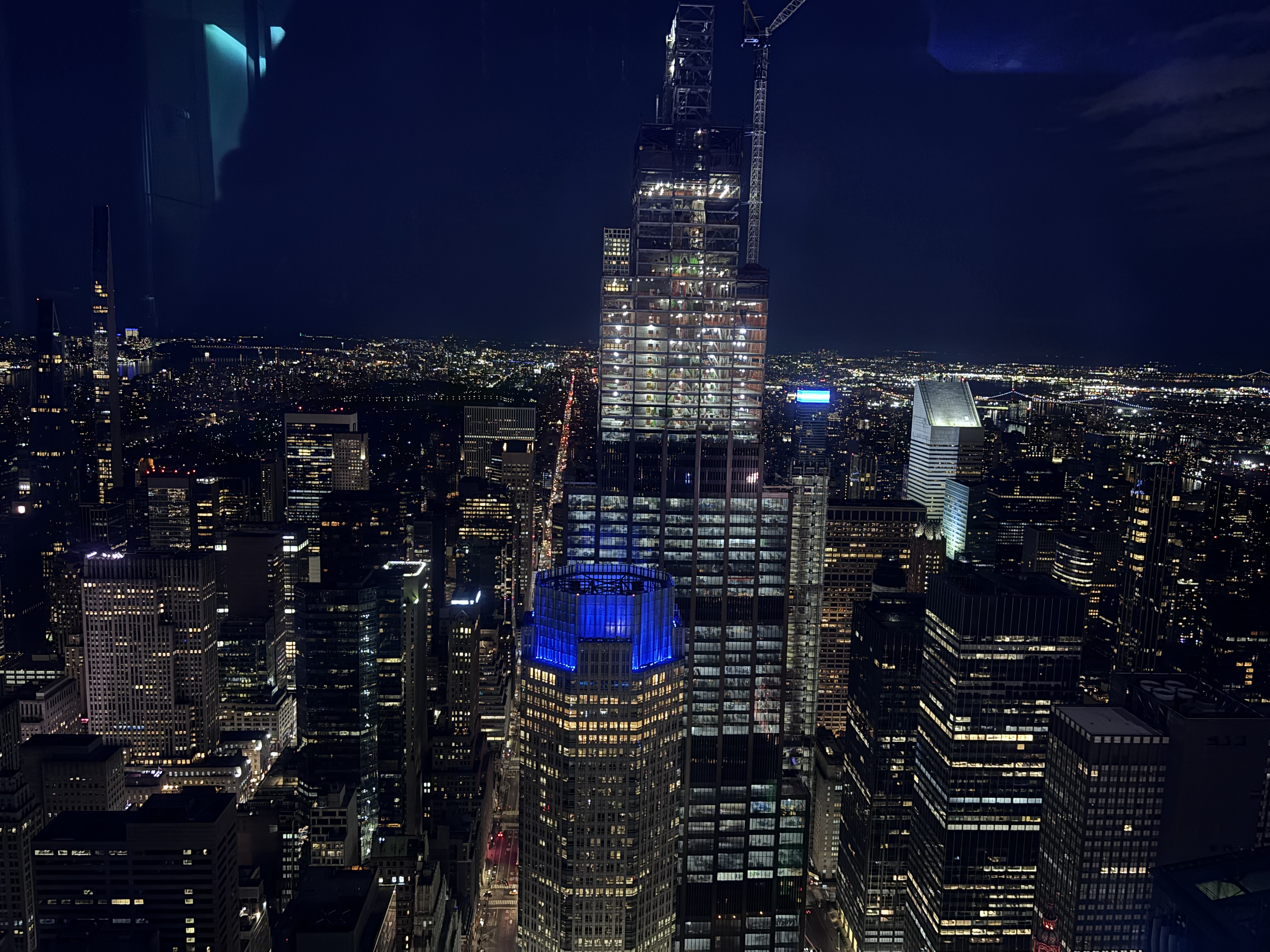
270 Park Avenue viewed from One Vanderbilt in March 2024

During construction, the planned tower received mixed reception. Architectural critic Alexandra Lange described the under-construction 270 Park Avenue in 2022 as "a Son of Hearst Tower grafted on top of creepy legs." Christopher Bonanos of Curbed characterized the tower's base as supporting "all that heft balance, quixotically, on ballerinas' toes." Reese Lewis of the Brooklyn Rail was critical of its development, criticizing its economic – rather than functional – motivation.

Upon its grand opening in 2025, its size, scale, and cost received attention; The Architect's Newspaper said that "the critical response was mostly meh". Bloomberg News said that 270 Park Avenue's presence expanded a cluster of neighboring buildings occupied by JPMorgan: 277 Park Avenue, 245 Park Avenue, and 383 Madison Avenue. The Wall Street Journal listed the tower among the publication's "best architecture of 2025", saying that the design evoked 1920s-era towers. The Guardian described it as an "eco obscenity" and "affront to the New York skyline", with its writer Oliver Wainwright criticizing its heavy use of structural steel. Crain's New York called the new tower a "financial temple" within the city; the Financial Times labeled the skyscraper a "fortress" and a "monument to American finance"; and ArtReview likened the building to a tank that "makes everything in its vicinity appear under threat".

Jack Murphy of The Architect's Newspaper stated that 270 Park Avenue's design and symbolism were highly debated in a similar manner to the viral 2015 debates over the colors of "the dress". Dezeen, while praising the building's massing, materials, and structure, said that its construction required the demolition of the Union Carbide Building, something it deemed wasteful. Architectural Record similarly lamented the Union Carbide Building while praising the new tower's offices as futuristic. Christopher Hawthorne, writing for The Punchlist newsletter, said it was ironic that Skidmore, Owings & Merrill had designed both the Union Carbide Building and the interior of the new tower.

== See also ==
- 28 Liberty Street
- List of tallest buildings in New York City
- List of tallest buildings in the United States
