= Hotel Marguery =

Hotel in Manhattan, New York (1917–1957)

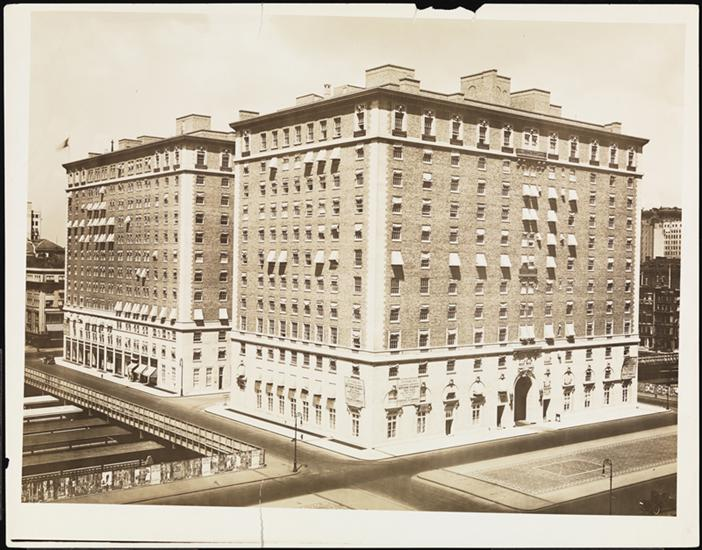
- The Hotel Marguery in 1918

General information
- Architectural style: Renaissance Revival
- Location: 270 Park Avenue; Midtown Manhattan, New York City, U.S.
- Coordinates: 40.7558°N 73.9755°W
- Year built: 1917
- Demolished: 1957

Design and construction
- Developer: Charles V. Paterno

The Hotel Marguery was the first of three buildings located at 270 Park Avenue in the Midtown Manhattan neighborhood of New York City. It was a six-building apartment hotel complex built in 1917 as part of Terminal City. It was demolished in 1957 to make way for the Union Carbide Building.

== Hotel and residences ==
After the construction of Grand Central Terminal in 1913, the newly fashionable "Terminal City" area north of the terminal was ripe for investment. Developer Dr. Charles V. Paterno built what was called the largest apartment building in the world with two distinct sections. The mansion-like apartments that took the address 270 Park Avenue, and the apartment hotel that used the name Hotel Marguery on Madison Avenue. The residents would share a 70-by-275-foot (21 by 84 m) garden with a private drive. As the restrained brick and stone structure rose, Manhattan millionaires rushed to take apartments.

Undated postcard of the Italian Gardens

The 6-building complex which formed the 12-story, stone-clad Renaissance Revival Hotel Marguery was built in 1917 by Charles V. Paterno at a cost of more than $5 million. The New York Central Railroad owned the land underneath the project since the construction of Grand Central Terminal. The buildings were centered around a 250-foot-long Italian Garden which occupied the center of the block. When the building was first constructed, Vanderbilt Avenue passed through the center of the buildings where the garden was eventually built. After the street was closed, the hotel built a 60 feet (18 m) tall carriage arch which allowed private access to the courtyard. The buildings contained 29 stores, 180 long-term apartments, and 110 luxury suites which ranged from 6 to 16 rooms apiece. The high-end apartments rented for over $20,000 per year on average.

On January 3, 1930, an explosion started a fire in the basement of the building which cut power and killed two people due to smoke inhalation. In 1933, the hotel's owners sued to reduce their property taxes significantly on the grounds that the property's assessed value was almost $5 million too high. After eight years in court, Justice Charles B. McLaughlin reduced the assessment in 1941 by an aggregate $19.588 million for the previous eight years, resulting in a refund of over $600,000 to the hotel's owners. In 1923, Nikola Tesla rented rooms at the Hotel Marguery. Harry Frazee, the owner of the Boston Red Sox who sold Babe Ruth to the Yankees, also lived here. In June 1945, a wealthy textile executive named Albert E. Langford was shot to death in the hallway outside of his apartment on the seventh floor of the Hotel Marguery. In September 1947, the NYPD busted an underground gambling ring in the hotel, arresting 11 men.

== CBS and Time Inc. ==
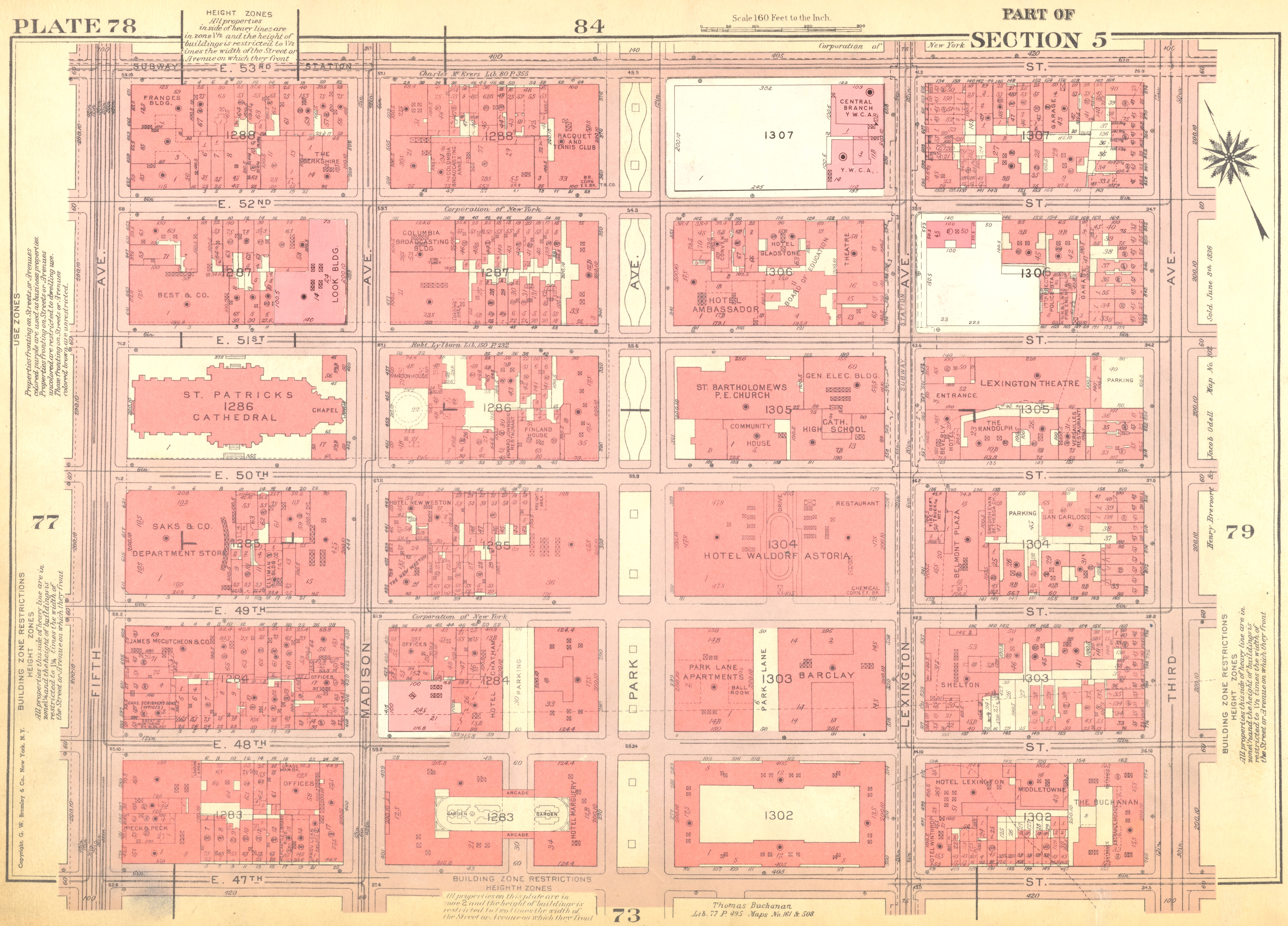
Hotel Marguery on a map from the 1950s

Plans for a replacement to the Hotel Marguery had first surfaced in 1944, when William Zeckendorf's Webb and Knapp planned a new 34-story structure. The building would have had a limestone facade with decorative vertical stainless steel columns. In 1945, CBS agreed to occupy the building but quickly backed out. Department store Wanamaker's also reportedly considered the site for an uptown location in addition to the main branch at Broadway and Ninth. Plans for the new structure faced a setback in 1946 when the Office of Price Administration denied Webb & Knapp's petition to evict the 116 residents of the building.

In the late 1940s, Time Inc. had an option to purchase the property and build a new headquarters for the company. The company planned a 39-story, 1 million square feet (93,000 m^{2}) building designed by Harrison & Abramovitz which was approved in June 1947, despite the protests of the hotel tenants. Time would have occupied 350,000 square feet (33,000 m^{2}) of the space as its new world headquarters. At $23 million, the project was expected to be the largest private construction project in Manhattan since the end of World War II. Following the new tower's approval, the Marguery's tenants announced they would fight the decisions in the courts and through the city's Office of Rent Control. The tenants of the hotel hired New York prosecutor Peter McCoy as their attorney to oppose the destruction of the buildings. McCoy had previously prosecuted stockbrokers for the government before entering private practice. The tenants also appealed to the New York City Council to oppose the demolition. In 1948, the hotel closed as it had lost its luster and was reportedly "heavily populated by ladies of the night and by gambling outfits.” Due to the failure to evict the Marguery's tenants, Time gave up on the plans for a new tower in March 1950. Ultimately, Time instead moved to 1271 Avenue of the Americas at Rockefeller Center in 1958.

By 1951, the Hotel Marguery's former Italian Gardens had been converted to a parking lot. The same year, Webb & Knapp unveiled plans to spend $50 million to erect a 44-story, 580 feet (180 m) tall office building on the site. The building would be topped by a 1,000 feet (300 m) tall steel latticework observation tower, making the proposed building taller than the Empire State Building and the tallest building in New York City. The chemical company Union Carbide agreed to lease the site in August 1955 to serve as its world headquarters. At the time, the Marguery had been almost entirely converted from apartments into office suites. Some of the 250 tenants included Renault, Rheem Manufacturing Company, Georgia-Pacific, Nedick's, Damon Runyon Cancer Research Foundation, Airlines for America, The Manila Times, and the United Nations delegations for Mexico, Ethiopia, Liberia, and Venezuela. Demolition of the former hotel began in early 1957 and was completed by late August. The new building at 270 Park Avenue was completed in 1960.

== In popular culture ==
- When the Hotel Marguery occupied 270 Park Avenue, it was one of several locations in New York City featured in the 1947 film noir Kiss of Death.
