= 400 Madison Avenue =

Office building in Manhattan, New York

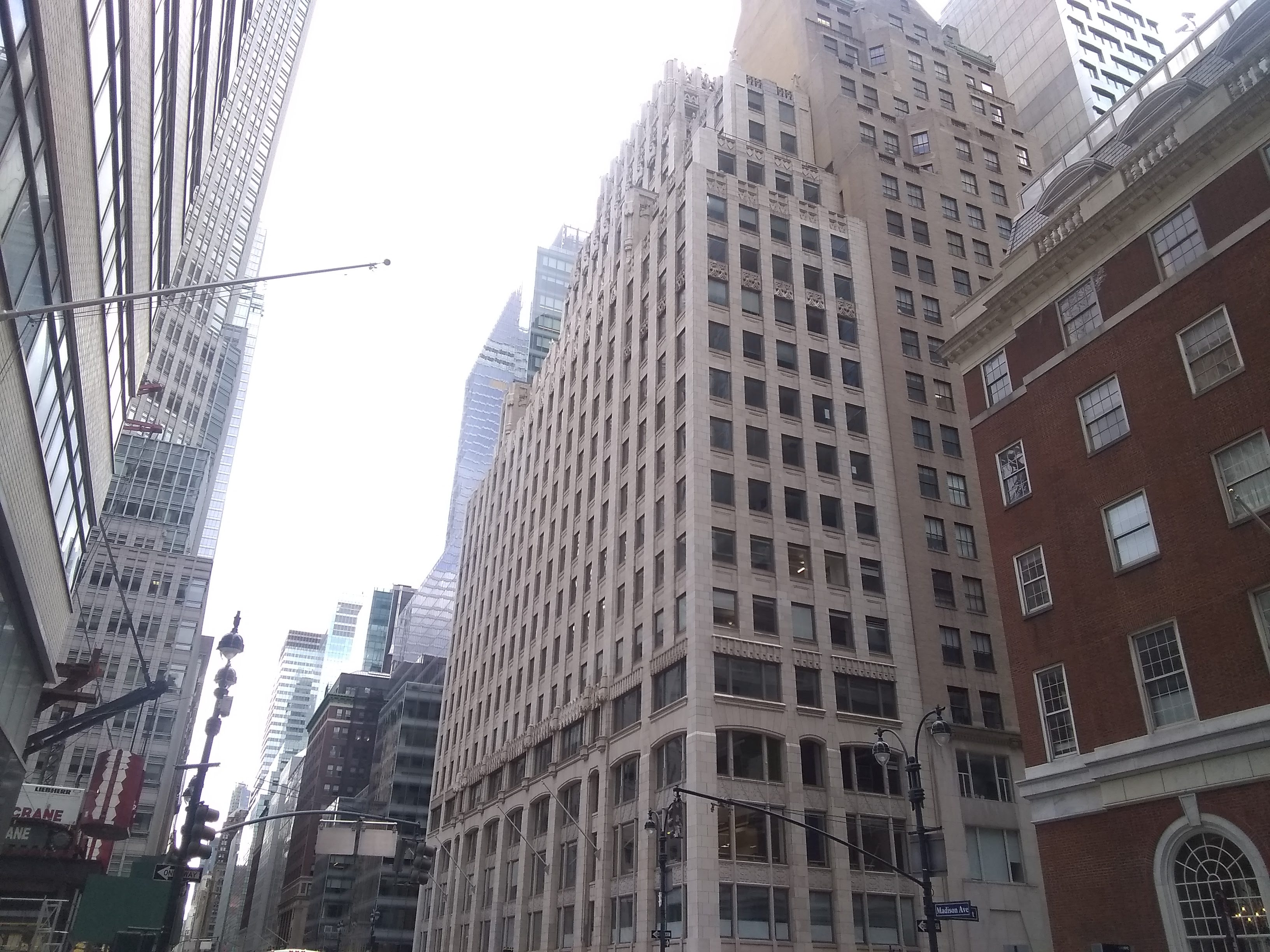
- Seen from the north
- Interactive map of the 400 Madison Avenue area

General information
- Location: Manhattan, New York, U.S.
- Coordinates: 40°45′23″N 73°58′37″W
- Construction started: 1928
- Completed: 1930

Height
- Roof: 241 ft (73 m)

Technical details
- Floor count: 22

Design and construction
- Architect: H. Craig Severance
- Main contractor: George A. Fuller Company

New York City Landmark
- Designated: November 22, 2016
- Reference no.: 2576

400 Madison Avenue is a 22-story office building in Midtown Manhattan in New York City. It is along Madison Avenue's western sidewalk between 47th and 48th Streets, near Grand Central Terminal. 400 Madison Avenue was designed by H. Craig Severance with Neo-Gothic architectural detailing.

The building was erected within "Terminal City", a collection of buildings located above Grand Central's underground tracks, and as such, occupies the real-estate air rights above these tracks. 400 Madison Avenue's lot is relatively narrow, being about 200 feet (61 m) long and less than 45 feet (14 m) wide, but contains a "veneer" of offices along its three primary facades and a small office core at the center. The building contains several setbacks to comply with the 1916 Zoning Resolution. The cream-colored terracotta facade was meant to reflect light.

The building was constructed from 1927 to 1928 by the George A. Fuller Company. Despite being relatively narrow, the building attracted businessmen who sought small, imposing offices. The New York City Landmarks Preservation Commission designated 400 Madison Avenue as an official landmark in 2016.

== Site ==
400 Madison Avenue is in the Midtown Manhattan neighborhood of New York City. It is bounded by Madison Avenue to the east, 48th Street to the north, and 47th Street to the south. The land lot covers 8,987 square feet (834.9 m^{2}) with a frontage of 200 feet (61 m) on Madison Avenue and 44.75 feet (13.64 m) on 47th and 48th Streets. Nearby buildings include the old New York Mercantile Library to the west, Tower 49 to the north, 270 Park Avenue to the east, and 383 Madison Avenue to the southeast.

The completion of the underground Grand Central Terminal in 1913 resulted in the rapid development of Terminal City, the area around Grand Central, as well as a corresponding increase in real-estate prices. Among these were office buildings such as the Chanin Building, Bowery Savings Bank Building, and New York Central Building, as well as hotels like the Biltmore, Commodore, Waldorf Astoria, and Summit. By 1920, the area had become what The New York Times called "a great civic centre". Irwin Chanin, who had developed the Chanin Building, believed the area around Grand Central Terminal had potential for growth because of the construction of hotels and apartment buildings at Tudor City, Sutton Place, and Lexington and Park Avenues. Before 400 Madison Avenue's development, the building's site was occupied by the Ritz Chambers and Carlton Chambers, a pair of apartment houses immediately north of the Ritz-Carlton Hotel.

== Architecture ==
The building was designed by H. Craig Severance and erected by the George A. Fuller Company. It consists of 22 stories, including the attic. The building measures 241 feet (73 m) tall to its roof. The building's 15th, 17th, and 20th stories contain setbacks to comply with the 1916 Zoning Resolution. The land lot is within a "2X" zoning district, allowing the first setback to be 160 feet (49 m) above ground. Unlike similar structures on small lots, such as the Fred F. French Building, 400 Madison Avenue is symmetrical. (Note: Buildings inside a 2X district can rise twice the height of the neighboring street before the first setback. For 400 Madison Avenue, the 160-foot height of the first setback is twice the avenue's 80-foot width.)

George Shepard Chappell, writing in The New Yorker under the pseudonym "T-Square", lambasted 400 Madison Avenue's shape as "distressingly pretentious" with "entirely unnecessary" detailing on the facade. However, the design was praised in Architecture and Building magazine as "a distinct ornament" to Madison Avenue, with an "exceedingly interesting block front".

=== Facade ===
The design of 400 Madison Avenue was meant to contain a French motif, but in practice, the design emphasis was on the vertical piers of the facade. The exterior is made of cream-colored architectural terracotta with Neo-Gothic decorative details. William LaZinsk, an architect for Severance's company, explained that cream terracotta was used because it was able to both absorb and reflect sunlight. According to LaZinsk, cream terracotta could be used to form highlights and shadows that "vary with the changing position of the sun", even as these details maintained the same general effect throughout the day. The three facades are relatively similar in design, with most ornamentation on the lowest and highest stories. The lowest five stories contain large windows, while the other stories contain smaller windows.

At the base, there are eleven bays on Madison Avenue. The third and ninth bays from south to north are narrow, corresponding to one window on the upper stories, while the other bays are wide, corresponding to two windows. On both 47th and 48th Streets, there are three bays: a narrow bay flanked by two wider ones. The primary facade at Madison Avenue contains a ground story clad with pink granite, as well as eight storefronts and two additional windows. This facade originally contained a large entrance portal, which was removed before 1983. The side facade on 47th Street had another arched entrance, which became a store window sometime after 1940. The storefront openings are separated by vertical pilasters and contain decorative features such as chevrons, quatrefoils, colonettes, and finials.

The second through fourth stories on all sides are square-headed on the second and third stories and segmentally arched on the fourth story. On Madison Avenue, the narrow bays are flanked by triple-story engaged columns, which are topped by foliated capitals. At the fifth story, the center seven bays on Madison Avenue (comprising the two narrow bays and five wider bays between them) are topped by a thick band with Gothic motifs connected by tabernacles with crockets. The side facades, and outer bays on Madison Avenue, are topped by bands that resemble colonettes.

The sixth through 14th stories are similar in design to each other. On all sides, the windows on each of the sixth through 14th stories are generally separated vertically by slightly projecting piers and horizontally by recessed spandrel panels. The exception is the outermost eight windows on Madison Avenue, which have projecting Gothic-tracery spandrel panels separating the windows on the 12th and 13th stories. Above the 14th story, there are slightly projecting pavilions on the Madison Avenue facade, which contain stylized motifs. The 14th and 16th floors have various stylized motifs in the center bays and less ornate decorative elements in the outer bays. There are recessed panels separating the windows horizontally on the 17th through 20th floors. The 21st story is topped by a "crown" with Gothic tracery.

=== Features ===
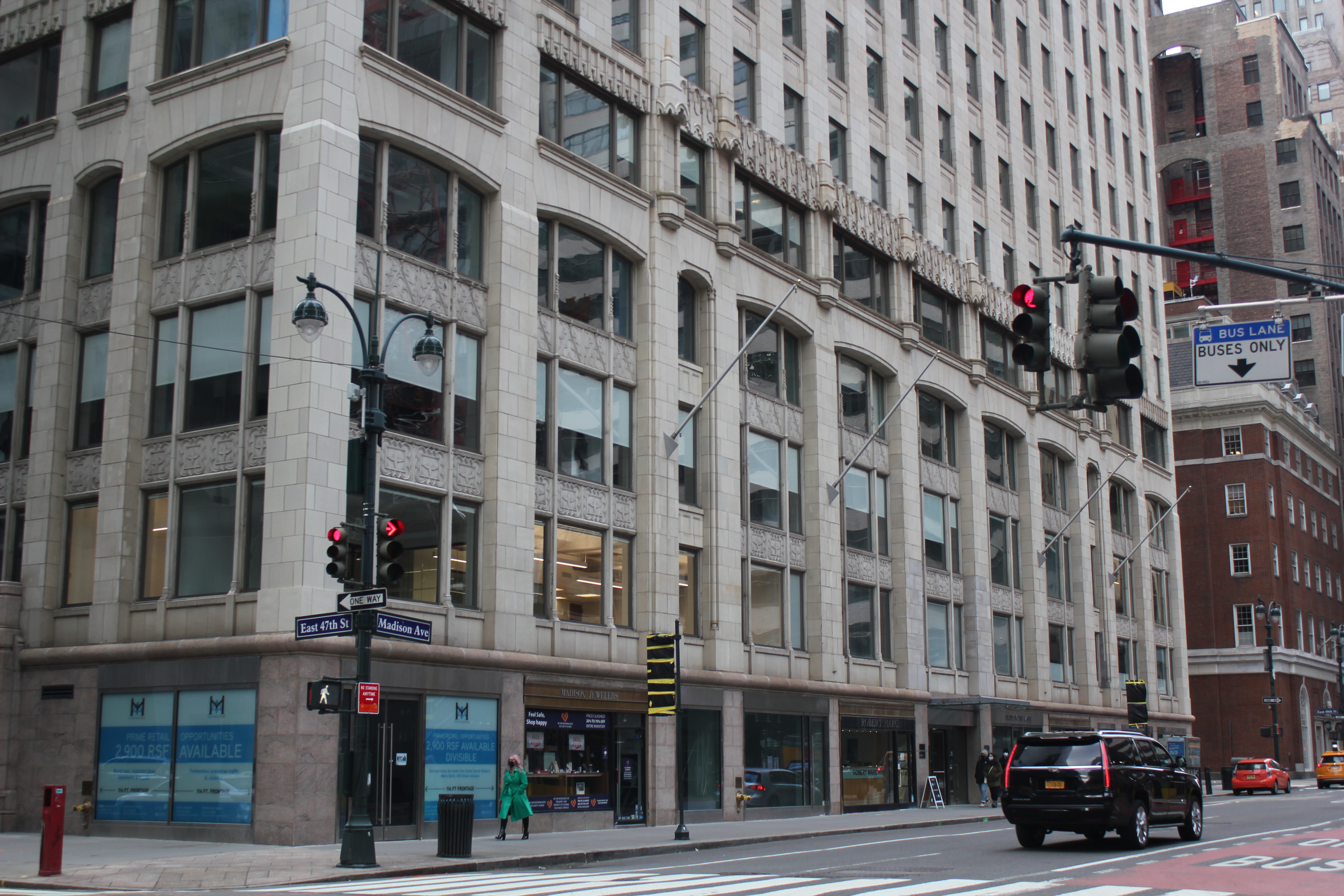
Seen from 47th Street and Madison Avenue

400 Madison Avenue contains about 200,000 square feet (19,000 m^{2}) of interior area. (Note: The Real Deal New York cites the building as having 190,000 square feet (18,000 m^{2}), while The New York Times says it has 200,000 square feet (19,000 m^{2}).) Because of the narrow lot area, all offices were lit by windows along any of the three street frontages and there were no interior light courts. The elevators and corridors were clustered at the rear or western section of the building. As the 1916 Zoning Resolution typically mandated that buildings' upper stories had to be smaller than the lower stories, the presence of more elevator shafts reduced the amount of usable space in a building. At 400 Madison Avenue, four elevator shafts were deemed sufficient to serve all the interior space. According to Architecture and Building magazine, the building was planned with six elevator shafts; the remaining two would have been used if a never-completed annex to the west had been developed. However, this never occurred and the two additional elevator shafts were used as storage space on each floor.

The edges of the building are designed with a "thin veneer" of offices. This meant all office space was within 27 feet (8 m) or 29 feet (9 m) of a window. At the time, real estate developers believed that "first quality space" should be amply illuminated by natural light; such space could not be any more than 20 to 28 feet (6.1 to 8.5 m) of a window since office space at a greater depth would lose significant value. The narrow shape was described by a contemporary New York Herald Tribune article as "an unusual structure both in appearance and as a real estate renting proposition". According to a Severance employee, the windows' surface area was 58 percent of the floor area. Each floor contains an average of 8,500 square feet (790 m^{2}).

The ground floor contained nine storefronts. There was also a main entrance lobby, flanked on either side by marble stairs that rose to the mezzanine. The second floor and mezzanine were both intended for the use of a financial institution, such as a bank.

== History ==
=== Planning and construction ===
The banker George L. Ohrstrom founded the 400 Madison Avenue Corporation in 1928 to erect a building at that address in New York City. In September 1928, the 400 Madison Avenue Corporation proposed to build a 20-story office building on Madison Avenue between 47th and 48th Streets. At the time, there were two leaseholds held by Egmont Estates, each measuring 100 feet (30 m) on Madison Avenue and a little less than 45 feet (14 m) on either side street. These leases, for the Ritz Chambers and Carlton Chambers apartment houses, did not expire until the 2010s. E. A. Johnson, the 400 Madison Avenue Corporation's vice president, said that Madison Avenue was seeing commercial growth. He cited a mid-1929 survey that found that, during a ten-hour period in a typical weekday, over 600,000 people passed on Madison Avenue between 42nd and 50th Streets.

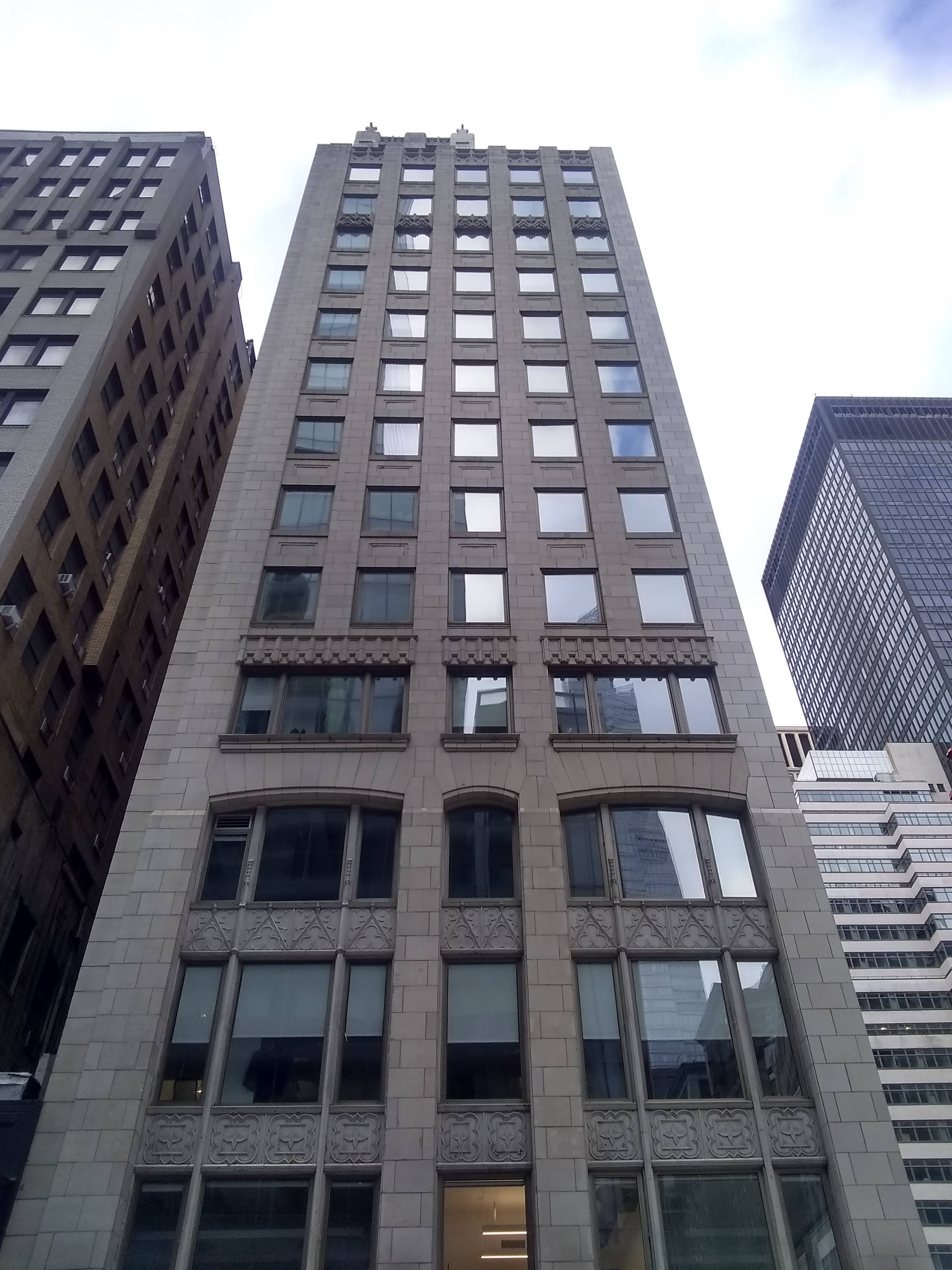
47th Street facade

In October 1928, G. L. Ohrstrom & Co. Inc., along with two other companies associated with the project, issued $1.9 million in first mortgage bonds, to be due in twenty years. The same month, H. Craig Severance Inc. filed plans for an office building on the site, to cost $1.25 million. The building was intended specifically for small office tenants, and the Charles F. Noyes Company was hired in January 1929 to rent out the space. 400 Madison Avenue contained less than a sixth of the nearby Chrysler Building's floor space, and the developers believed there was a market for firms, professionals, and businesspersons who wanted "small but impressive offices", such as financial firms in Lower Manhattan that desired a Midtown branch office. Most of the other office buildings in the area were intended for large tenants, while small tenants were relegated to "second rate" structures or be "practically submerged" by major tenants in the larger structures.

By August 1929, the building was nearly complete, and advertisements in newspapers such as The New York Times and the New York Herald Tribune were touting the building's small well-lit space and central site. One such advertisement, geared toward lawyers, praised the proximity to "many of America's most prominent business houses", as well as to the area's shops, hotels, and apartments. Another advertisement, intended for financial firms, said: "You will be proud to receive your clients in such an environment at this address of dominating prestige." In other promotional materials, the building's house number, 400, was used to evoke the upper class. At 400 Madison Avenue's opening, the Times characterized the building as being one of several buildings that comprised the "Grand Canyon of midtown business".

=== 20th century ===
The building officially opened on October 1, 1929. The early tenants were largely in advertising, finance, insurance, law, and real estate. Among the early tenants were numerous firms trading on the New York Stock Exchange, such as Cowen & Co. and Joseph Siven & Co. George McAneny, the former president of the New York City Board of Aldermen, leased nearly an entire floor for the Ritz-Carlton chain of hotels, as well as the Regional Plan Association, both of which he had an interest in. A Bulgarian consulate was also housed in the building, as was the League of Women Voters of New York, the Lefcourt shoe company, and an Austrian tourist office. Crouch & Fitzgerald, luggage retailers, opened in the building in 1932 and had space in the building for several decades. A committee was organized in 1931 to protect the interests of the building's bondholders.

Other tenants subsequently moved to the building because it was close to Times Square, the Garment District, major publishers, television studios, and music and recording studios. The publications included Family Circle, which had offices there between 1932 and 1945, as well as various news publications through the 1980s. In addition, the Council on Books in Wartime leased some space at 400 Madison Avenue for its headquarters during World War II, shipping close to 123 million books during that time. After World War II, the building contained the offices of producer David O. Selznick and actress Lucille Lortel.

Investors Kimmelman and Zauderer bought a controlling interest in 400 Madison Avenue from the Girard Trust Company and the Starrett Corporation in 1950. At that point, rental income was estimated at $11 million. Nine years later, the investors acquired the minority interest in the building from Lefcourt Realty Corporation. During the 1960s, the building contained the offices of Hornblower & Weeks brokerage, and in the 1970s, it contained the Association of Black Foundation Executives.

=== 21st century ===
In 1998, Macklowe Properties acquired the building's $36 million mortgage from the receiver. The company's executive vice president William S. Macklowe said the firm was initially looking for large tenants; at the time, thirty percent of the building was vacant and the original electrical system remained in place. Macklowe Properties decided instead to market 400 Madison Avenue for smaller tenants, both because of demand for small tenancies at its property at 540 Madison Avenue, as well as 400 Madison Avenue's proximity to a new Grand Central Terminal entrance at 47th Street. (Note: The terminal entrance at the northeast corner of Madison Avenue and 47th Street was built in the late 1990s as part of Grand Central North.) The company renovated the penthouse and, by 2001, the building had some 50 tenants, many of which were financial firms. The building received a $55 million senior loan and an $11.5 million mezzanine loan in 2010.

ASB bought the building in 2012 for $139 million, assuming a $45 million mortgage, but placed it for sale four years later. In mid-2016, the New York City Landmarks Preservation Commission (LPC) proposed protecting twelve buildings in East Midtown, including 400 Madison Avenue, in advance of proposed changes to the area's zoning. On November 22, 2016, the LPC designated 400 Madison Avenue and ten other nearby buildings as city landmarks. ASB sold 400 Madison Avenue in 2018 to Korean company Daishin Securities for $194.5 million.

== See also ==
- List of New York City Designated Landmarks in Manhattan from 14th to 59th Streets
