= Francisco Múgica (disambiguation) =

Francisco Múgica or Francisco Mujica may refer to:

- Francisco José Múgica, (1884–1958) Mexican politician and general
- Francisco Múgica, (1907–1985), Argentine film director
- Francisco Mujica (cyclist) (born 1936), Venezuelan cyclist
- Francisco Mujica (architect) (1899–after 1929), Mexican architect
