= Pershing Square, Manhattan =

Plaza in Manhattan, New York

Coordinates: 40°45′07.6″N 73°58′39.6″W

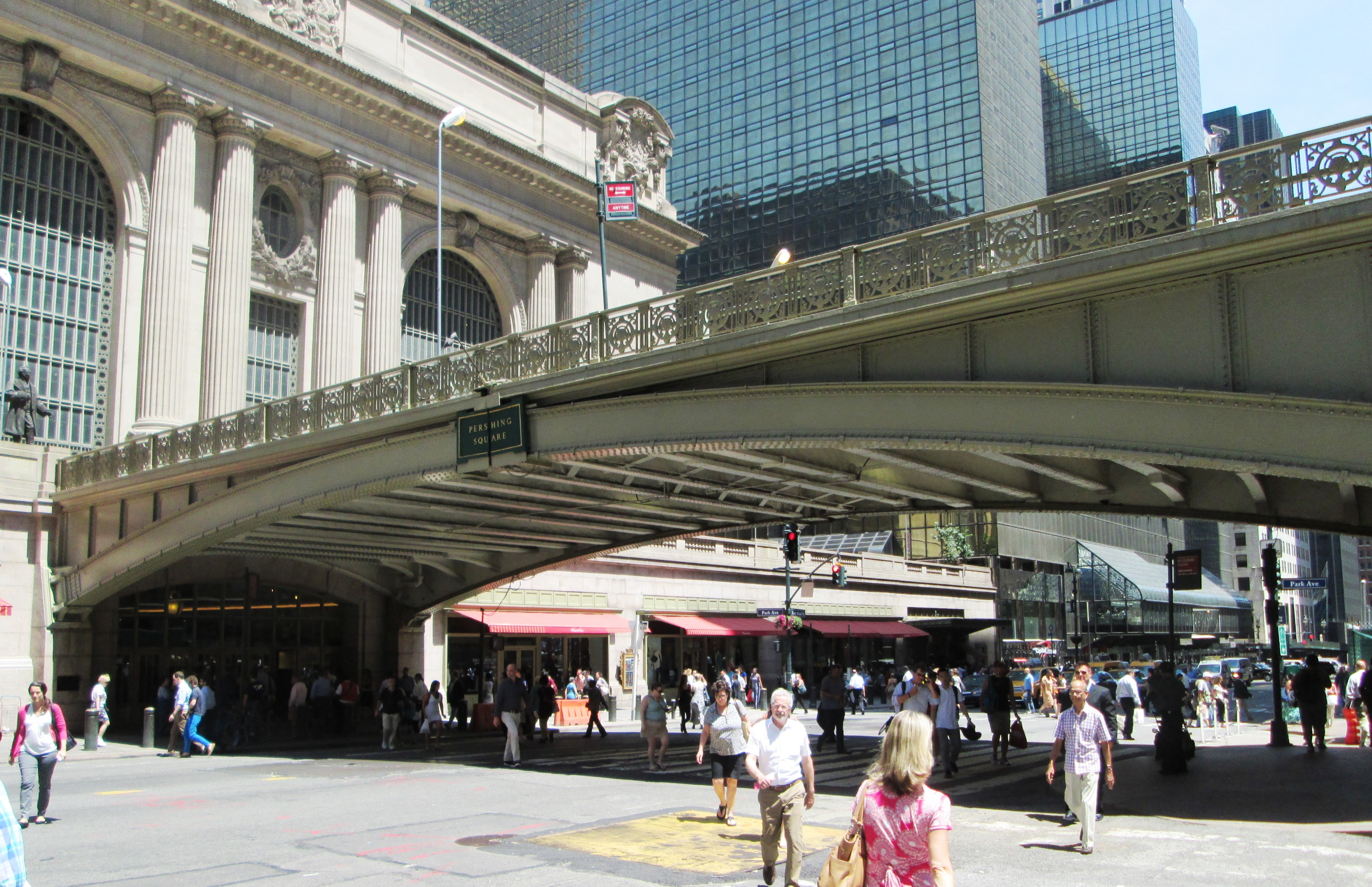
The Park Avenue Viaduct over 42nd Street, under which is Pershing Square; the green sign in the center of the bridge says "Pershing Square". Grand Central Terminal is on the center and left.

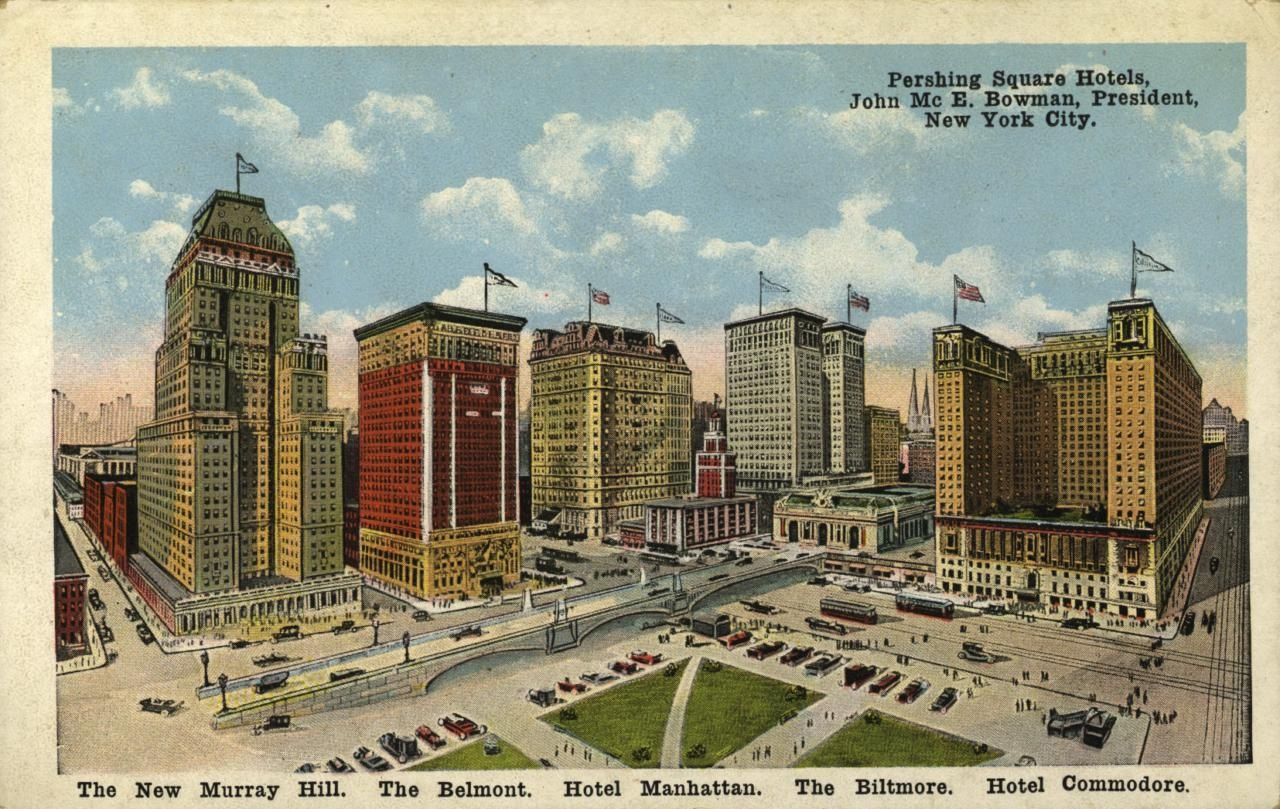
Pershing Square as originally proposed in 1919, showing (from L) a never-built replacement for the Murray Hill Hotel, the Belmont Hotel, the Hotel Manhattan, the Biltmore Hotel, Grand Central Terminal, and the Hotel Commodore

Map of Pershing Square
1 Park Avenue Viaduct
2 Pershing Square Building
3 110 East 42nd Street
4 Chanin Building

Pershing Square is a public plaza in Manhattan, New York City, located where Park Avenue and 42nd Street intersect in front of Grand Central Terminal. The main roadway of Park Avenue crosses over 42nd Street on the Park Avenue Viaduct, also known as the Pershing Square Viaduct. Two service roads, one northbound and one southbound, connect 42nd Street with the main roadway of Park Avenue, at 40th Street.

Pershing Square was named after John J. Pershing in 1919. The name was originally supposed to apply to the block bounded by Park Avenue, Lexington Avenue, 41st Street, and 42nd Street. Three buildings were ultimately developed on the block in the 1920s: the Pershing Square Building, 110 East 42nd Street, and the Chanin Building. Subsequently, the name applied to the service roads of the Park Avenue Viaduct. A tourist information center under the viaduct, at Pershing Square, was built in 1939; it was later reconfigured to be a store and then a restaurant. The service roads between 42nd and 41st Streets were converted into a pedestrian public plaza in 2018.

== Development ==
The square is named after General John J. Pershing, and was originally intended to be an open plaza in Pershing's honor occupying the entire block between 41st Street, Park Avenue, 42nd Street, and Lexington Avenue. Until 1885, Steuben Street—named for Revolutionary War general Baron von Steuben—ran diagonally across the block. The Grand Union Hotel was built on the northwestern corner of the block in 1883. The eastern part of the block contained the Manhattan Storage Warehouse, which was built in 1882. The hotel was condemned via eminent domain in 1914, and it was subsequently demolished to make way for the construction of the New York City Subway's Grand Central–42nd Street station, which ran diagonally below the site.

Shortly after the opening of the Park Avenue Viaduct in 1919, the area at the bottom of the viaduct was renamed for Pershing. The former Grand Union Hotel space was proposed for use as an open plaza with a three-story memorial called "Victory Hall". The idea of a victory hall was opposed by Fiorello H. La Guardia, president of the New York City Board of Aldermen. The Transit Commission attempted to sell the building site in May 1920 for $2.8 million (equal to $33.1 million in 2024), but no one placed a bid.

In July 1920, a realty consortium headed by investor Henry Mandel bought the Grand Union site. Mandel gave the Bowery Savings Bank the center part of the Pershing Square block, which would be developed into an office building at 110 East 42nd Street, completed in 1923. The western part of the site became the Pershing Square Building, also completed in 1923. The eastern part, which contained the storage warehouse, was redeveloped into the Chanin Building, which opened in 1929. The "Pershing Square" name subsequently applied to the service roads of the Park Avenue Viaduct between 40th and 42nd streets.

== Viaduct space and closure to traffic ==
The space under the viaduct between 41st and 42nd streets was originally used as a trolley barn. In 1938, the city announced that it would build a tourist information center within that space in advance of the 1939 New York World's Fair. The city subsequently built a steel and glass-brick structure under the center arch of the viaduct. The structure, located at 90 East 42nd Street, opened in December 1939 and was initially used to provide tourist information. During World War II, the space was used by United Service Organizations, and after the war, became an outpost of the New York Convention and Visitors Bureau. The building had become an unemployment office by the 1980s.

As early as 1987, the Grand Central Partnership had proposed closing the western leg of Pershing Square, which was lightly used. Two years later, the partnership proposed turning the space under the viaduct, at the time a discount store, into a restaurant. Pershing Square would also be closed to traffic between 41st and 42nd streets. At the time, the space was occupied by discount retailer North Pole Stores, which relocated elsewhere in March 1992. The Grand Central Partnership decided to go forward with the restaurant-conversion project in 1993. However, the project had experienced difficulties because Manhattan Community Board 5 was opposed to the partnership's plan to close the adjacent block of Park Avenue, and the city had requested that the project undergo a lengthy zoning procedure called the Uniform Land Use Review Procedure. The community board opposed the closure because, between Seventh Avenue and Second Avenue, the only opportunity for eastbound traffic on 42nd Street to make a right turn was at Park Avenue. By mid-1995, the section of Park Avenue between 41st and 42nd streets was closed to traffic every weekday between 11 a.m. and 3 p.m., and office workers began eating lunch there.

In November 1995, the city and the Grand Central Partnership unveiled plans to spend $2 million restoring the space under the viaduct and leasing it as a restaurant, as well as closing part of Pershing Square. The Pershing Square Cafe signed a lease at the space in 1997. The operator of the renovated space, Michael O'Keeffe, placed so much attention to the renovation of the space that the project's costs increased to $5 million, and the cafe's opening date was pushed back by several months. The details in the cafe included slot-headed screws, the only ones available when the viaduct was built; chairs and electric cords imported from Paris, and a hand-rubbed paint scheme. The entrance of the cafe was placed at 42nd Street, while the kitchen was located near the 41st Street section of the viaduct.

Manhattan Community Board 5 recommended in 2009 that the service roads between 41st and 42nd streets be closed and turned into a public pedestrian plaza. The New York City Department of Design and Construction (DDC) announced in 2013 that it would spend $2 million to permanently close the western roadway (which carried southbound traffic) and convert it into a plaza with asphalt-and-concrete blocks, a rain garden, and terraces. The project would be designed by Quennell Rothschild & Partners. The project commenced in 2018 and the western plaza opened in May 2019. The DDC began converting the eastern roadway into a plaza in December 2021; at the time, the project was to be completed in October 2023. The plaza in the eastern roadway opened at the end of May 2025, having cost $16.7 million.

== See also ==
- List of restaurants in New York City
