= Terminal City (Manhattan) =

Commercial development in New York City

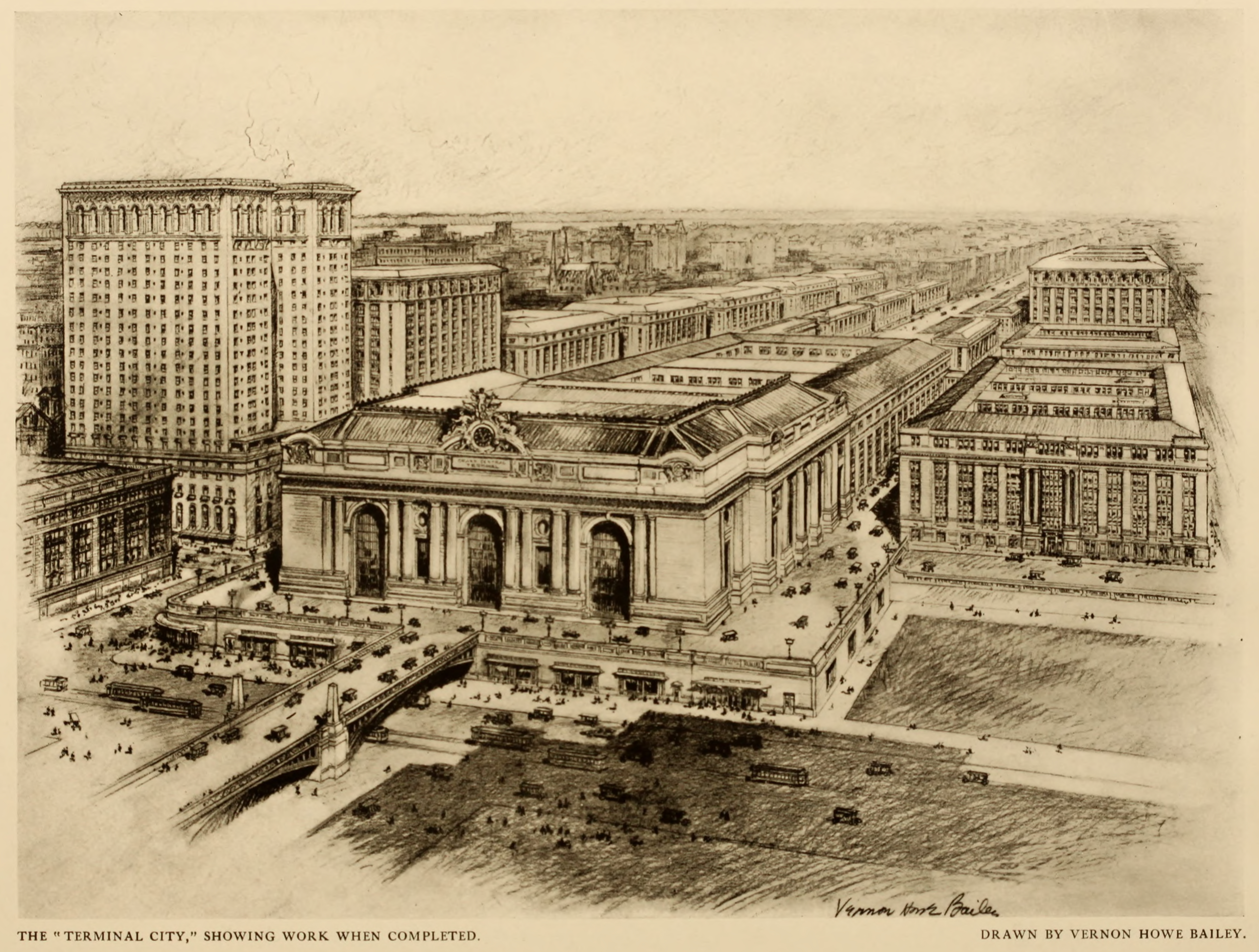
Artist's depiction of Terminal City when complete; published 1913

Terminal City, also known as the Grand Central Zone, is an early 20th century commercial and office development in Midtown Manhattan, New York City. The space was developed atop the former Grand Central Station railyard, after the New York Central Railroad decided to rebuild the station into Grand Central Terminal, and reshape the railyard into a below-ground train shed, allowing roads and skyscrapers to be built atop it.

== Constituent structures ==
Interactive map outlining Grand Central Terminal's head house and below ground train shed

Note: some links may direct to the current building at the same address

=== Rail terminal and supporting structures ===
- Grand Central Terminal (completed 1913)
- Grand Central Terminal Baggage Building (completed c. 1913, demolished)
- 50th Street Substation (completed 1906, demolished)
- Park Avenue Viaduct (completed 1928)

=== Surrounding buildings ===
- Grand Central Post Office / 450 Lexington Avenue (completed 1909)
- Grand Central Palace (completed 1911, demolished)
- New York Biltmore Hotel (completed 1913, gutted)
- Yale Club of New York City (completed 1915)
- Vanderbilt Concourse Building / 52 Vanderbilt Avenue (completed 1916)
- Hotel Marguery (completed 1917, demolished)
- Commodore Hotel (completed 1919, gutted)
- Liggett Building (completed 1922, demolished)
- Bowery Savings Bank Building (completed 1923)
- Knapp Building (completed 1923, demolished)
- Pershing Square Building (completed 1923)
- Prudence Bond & Mortgage Building (completed 1923, demolished)
- The Roosevelt Hotel (completed 1924)
- Postum Building (completed 1924)
- 277 Park Avenue (completed 1925, demolished)
- InterContinental New York Barclay Hotel (completed 1926)
- Graybar Building (completed 1927)
- Park Lane Hotel (completed 1927, demolished)
- 400 Madison Avenue (completed 1929)
- Helmsley Building (completed 1929)
- Chanin Building (completed 1929)
- Lexington Hotel (completed 1929)
- Chrysler Building (completed 1930)
- One Grand Central Place (completed 1930)
- Waldorf Astoria New York (completed 1931)

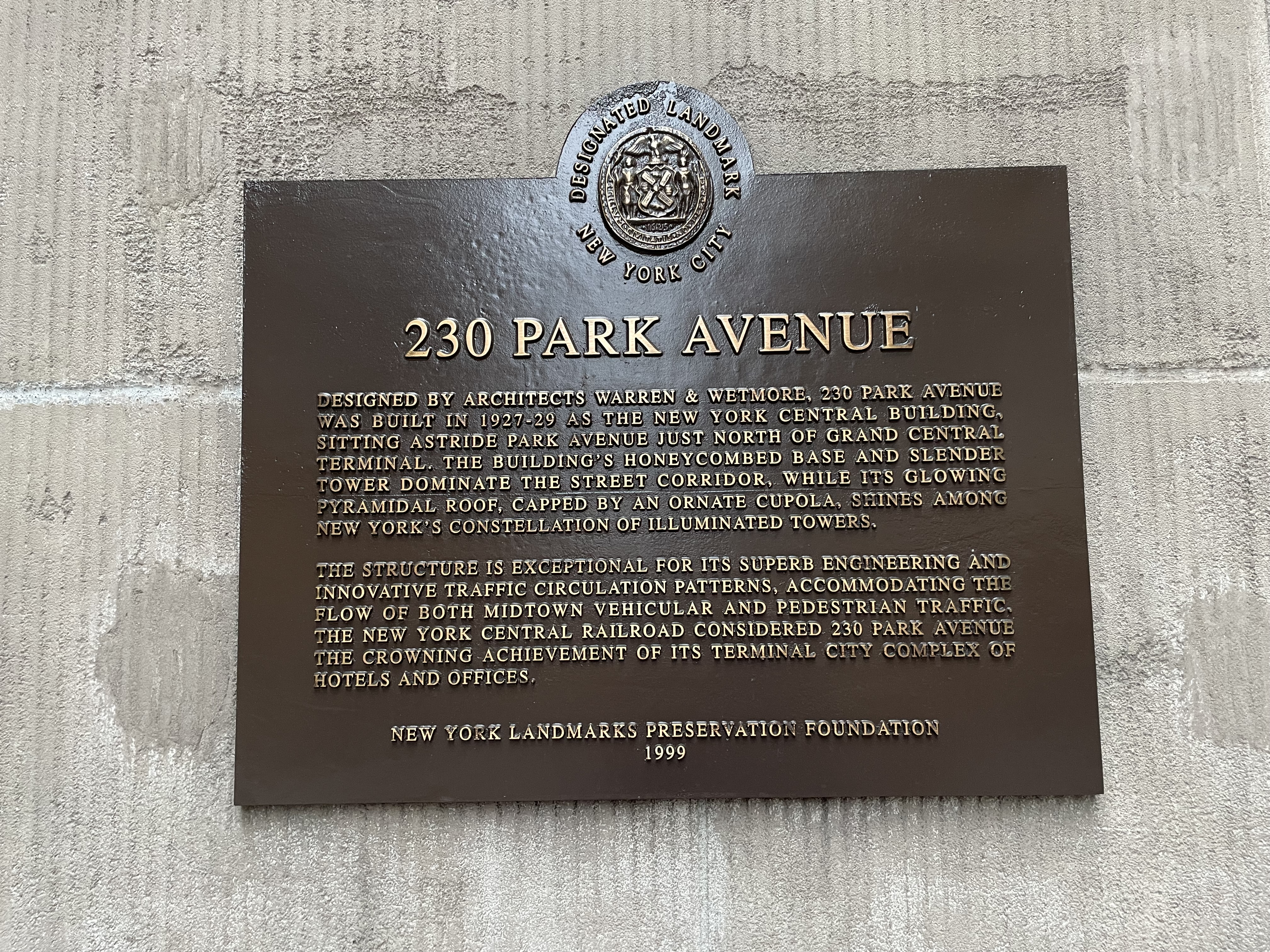
Landmark Plaque placed in 1999

=== Notable earlier and later developments ===
237 Park Avenue, or 466 Lexington Avenue, within the Grand Central Zone, was built in an earlier period of development, completed in 1905 though gutted in 1981.

These buildings within the Grand Central Zone were built in a later period of development:

- MetLife Building – Baggage Building successor
- Socony-Mobil Building
- One Vanderbilt
- 245 Park Avenue – Grand Central Palace successor
- 383 Madison Avenue – Knapp Building successor
- Grand Central Market building
- Union Carbide Building – Hotel Marguery successor
- 270 Park Avenue (2021–present) – Hotel Marguery and Union Carbide Building successor
- 277 Park Avenue – 277 Park Avenue successor
- 299 Park Avenue – Park Lane Hotel successor

== History ==
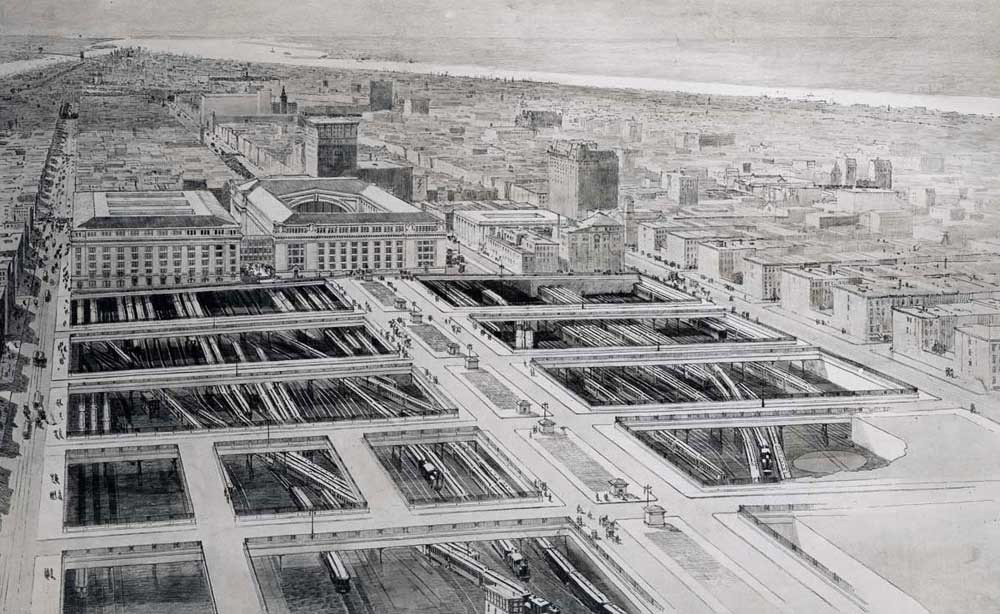
Sketch illustrating the train shed and available lots to build on, c. 1910

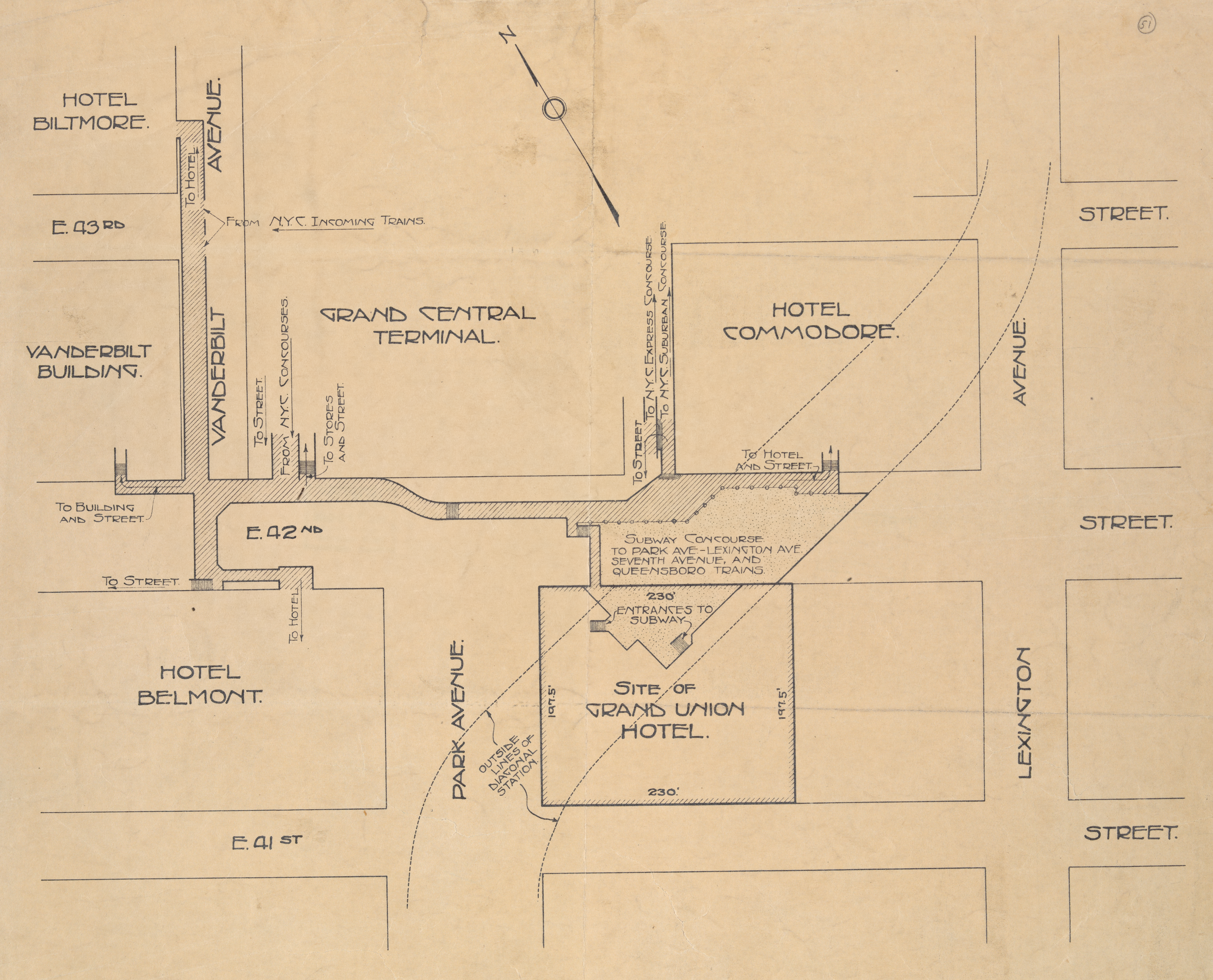
1917 map of underground passageways between new buildings surrounding Grand Central

Terminal City originated as an idea during the reconstruction of Grand Central Terminal from the old Grand Central Station from 1903 to 1913. The railroad owner, the New York Central and Hudson River Railroad, wished to increase capacity of the station's train shed and rail yards, and so it devised a plan to bury the tracks and platforms and create two levels to its new train shed, more than doubling the station's capacity. At the same time, chief engineer William J. Wilgus was the first to realize the potential of selling air rights, the right to build atop the now-underground train shed, for real-estate development. Grand Central's construction thus produced several blocks of prime real estate in Manhattan, stretching from 42nd to 51st Streets between Madison and Lexington Avenues. The Realty and Terminal Company typically profited from the air rights in one of two ways: constructing the structures and renting them out, or selling the air rights to private developers who would construct their own buildings.

William Wilgus saw these air rights as merely a means to fund the terminal's construction. Reed & Stem originally proposed a "Court of Honor" for this space, while other proposals included a new Metropolitan Opera House, a Madison Square Garden, or a National Academy of Design building. Ultimately, the railroads decided to develop the area into a commercial office district.

Planning for the development began long before the terminal was completed. In 1903, the New York Central Railroad created a derivative, the New York State Realty and Terminal Company, to oversee construction above Grand Central's rail yards. The New Haven Railroad joined the venture later on. One early proposed name for this area was "Pershing Square", a name that was ultimately applied to the southern side of Grand Central Terminal. The blocks on the north side of the terminal were later dubbed "Terminal City" or the "Grand Central Zone".

By 1906, news of the plans for Grand Central was already boosting the values of nearby properties. In conjunction with this project, the segment of Park Avenue above Grand Central's rail yards received a landscaped median and was widened to 140 feet (43 m). By the time the terminal opened in 1913, the blocks surrounding it were each valued at $2 million to $3 million. Terminal City soon became Manhattan's most desirable commercial and office district. From 1904 to 1926, land values along Park Avenue doubled, and land values in the Terminal City area increased 244%. A 1920 New York Times article said that the "development of the Grand Central property has in many respects surpassed original expectations. With its hotels, office buildings, apartments and underground streets it not only is a wonderful railroad terminal, but also a great civic centre."

=== Constituent structures and further history ===
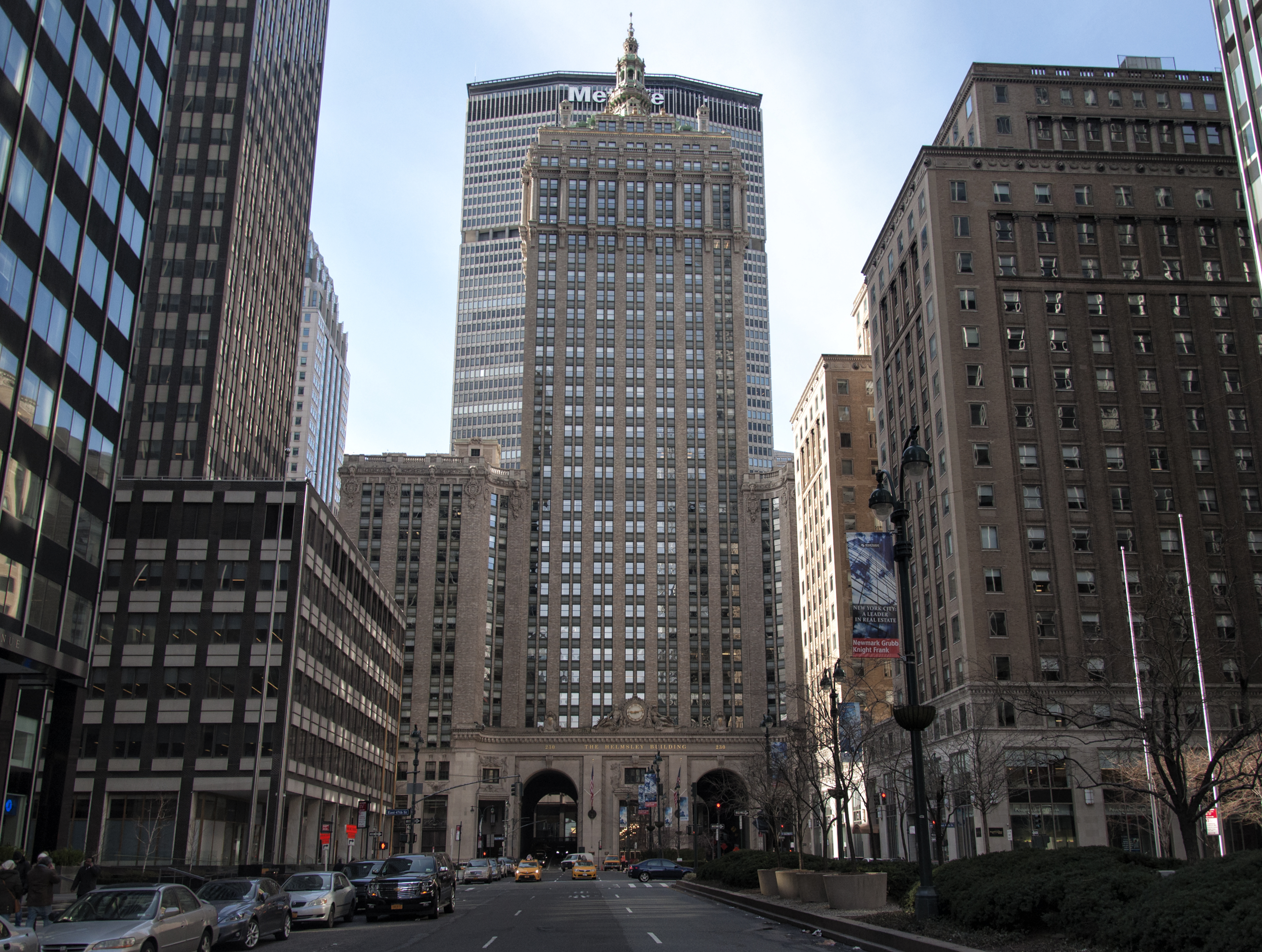
The Helmsley Building (in front of the MetLife Building) was built as a part of Terminal City

The first building in Terminal City was the new Grand Central Palace, which opened in 1911 and replaced another building of the same name.

The district came to include office buildings such as the Chrysler Building, Chanin Building, Bowery Savings Bank Building, and Pershing Square Building; luxury apartment houses along Park Avenue; an array of high-end hotels that included the Commodore, Biltmore, Roosevelt, Marguery, Chatham, Barclay, Park Lane, and Waldorf Astoria; the Grand Central Palace; and the Yale Club of New York City's clubhouse at 50 Vanderbilt Avenue. The structures immediately around Grand Central Terminal were developed shortly after the terminal's opening, while the structures along Park Avenue were constructed through the 1920s and 1930s.

These structures were designed in the neoclassical style, complementing the terminal's architecture. Although Warren and Wetmore designed most of these buildings, it also monitored other architects' plans (such as those of James Gamble Rogers, who designed the Yale Club) to ensure that the style of the new buildings was compatible with that of Terminal City. In general, the site plan of Terminal City was derived from the City Beautiful movement, which encouraged aesthetic harmony between adjacent buildings. The consistency of the architectural styles, as well as the vast funding provided by investment bankers, contributed to Terminal City's success.

The Graybar Building, completed in 1927, was one of the last projects of Terminal City. The building incorporates many of Grand Central's train platforms, as well as the Graybar Passage, a hallway with vendors and train gates stretching from the terminal to Lexington Avenue. In 1929, New York Central built its headquarters in a 34-story building, later renamed the Helmsley Building, which straddled Park Avenue north of the terminal. Development slowed drastically during the Great Depression, and part of Terminal City was gradually demolished or reconstructed with steel-and-glass designs after World War II. In particular, many of the low-rise residential structures on Park Avenue were replaced with International Style skyscrapers during the 1950s and 1960s, many of which were zoned for commercial use. Some residential buildings from the era still exist along Lexington Avenue. Remnants of the neoclassical design can also be seen in the Yale Club and Roosevelt Hotel on Vanderbilt Avenue.

== Business improvement district ==
The area shares similar boundaries as the Grand Central Business Improvement District, a neighborhood with businesses collectively funding improvements and maintenance in the area. The district is well-funded; in 1990 it had the largest budget of any business improvement district in the United States. The district's organization and operation is run by the Grand Central Partnership, which has given free tours of the station building. The partnership has also funded some restoration projects around the terminal, including installation of lamps to illuminate its facade and purchase of a streetlamp that used to stand on the Park Avenue Viaduct.

== See also ==
- Grand Central Partnership

== Sources ==
- Fitch, James Marston; Waite, Diana S. (1974). Grand Central Terminal and Rockefeller Center: A Historic-critical Estimate of Their Significance. Albany, New York: The Division.
- Grand Central Terminal of the New York Central Lines. New York Central Lines. c. 1912.
- "Grand Central Terminal" (PDF). Landmarks Preservation Commission. August 2, 1967.
- Robins, Anthony W.; New York Transit Museum (2013). Grand Central Terminal: 100 Years of a New York Landmark. ABRAMS. ISBN 978-1-61312-387-4.
- Schlichting, Kurt C. (2001). Grand Central Terminal: Railroads, Architecture and Engineering in New York. Baltimore: Johns Hopkins University Press. ISBN 978-0-8018-6510-7.
