= Pershing Square Building =

Office building in Manhattan, New York

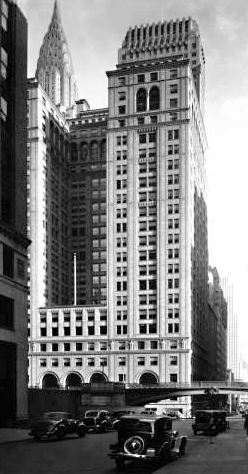
- The Pershing Square Building in 1936, looking east from 41st Street
- Interactive map of the Pershing Square Building area

General information
- Type: Office
- Architectural style: Romanesque Revival
- Location: 100 East 42nd Street; Midtown Manhattan, New York, US
- Coordinates: 40°45′06″N 73°58′39″W
- Construction started: 1921
- Completed: 1923
- Owner: SL Green

Height
- Architectural: 363 ft (111 m)
- Roof: 329 ft (100 m)

Technical details
- Floor count: 24

Design and construction
- Architect: John Sloan
- Architecture firm: Sloan & Robertson; York and Sawyer
- Developer: Henry Mandel
- Main contractor

New York City Landmark
- Designated: November 22, 2016
- Reference no.: 2556

The Pershing Square Building, also known as 125 Park Avenue or 100 East 42nd Street, is a 25-story office building in Midtown Manhattan in New York City, United States. It is located on the eastern side of Park Avenue between 41st and 42nd streets, across from Grand Central Terminal to the north and adjacent to 110 East 42nd Street to the east.

The Pershing Square Building was designed in the Romanesque Revival style by John Sloan and T. Markoe Robertson of the firm Sloan & Robertson, working with York and Sawyer. It was erected within "Terminal City", a collection of buildings located above the underground tracks surrounding Grand Central, and makes use of real-estate air rights above the tracks. The building is located directly above the New York City Subway's Grand Central–42nd Street station.

The Pershing Square Building, as well as 110 East 42nd Street, were built on the site of the Grand Union Hotel. Construction started in 1921 and was completed in 1923. Ownership of the Pershing Square Building passed to several companies; the latest such change occurred in 2010, when SL Green Realty bought the building. It was made a New York City designated landmark in 2016.

== Site ==
The Pershing Square Building is at 125 Park Avenue in the Midtown and Murray Hill neighborhoods of Manhattan in New York City, United States. It is bounded by 42nd Street to the north, Park Avenue to the west, and 41st Street to the south, at the west end of the city block that is also bounded by Lexington Avenue to the east. The rectangular land lot occupies 24,786 square feet (2,302.7 m^{2}), with a frontage of 197.5 feet (60.2 m) on Park Avenue and a depth of 125.5 feet (38.3 m) on 41st and 42nd Streets. On the same block, 110 East 42nd Street and the Chanin Building are to the east. Other nearby buildings include the Grand Hyatt New York hotel to the northeast, 101 Park Avenue to the south, One Grand Central Place to the west, and One Vanderbilt to the northwest.

The completion of the underground Grand Central Terminal in 1913 resulted in the rapid development of Terminal City, the area around Grand Central, as well as a corresponding increase in real-estate prices. Among these were the New York Central Building at 47th Street and Park Avenue, as well as the Grand Central Palace across 42nd Street from the present Pershing Square Building. By 1920, the area had become what The New York Times called "a great civic centre".

== Architecture ==
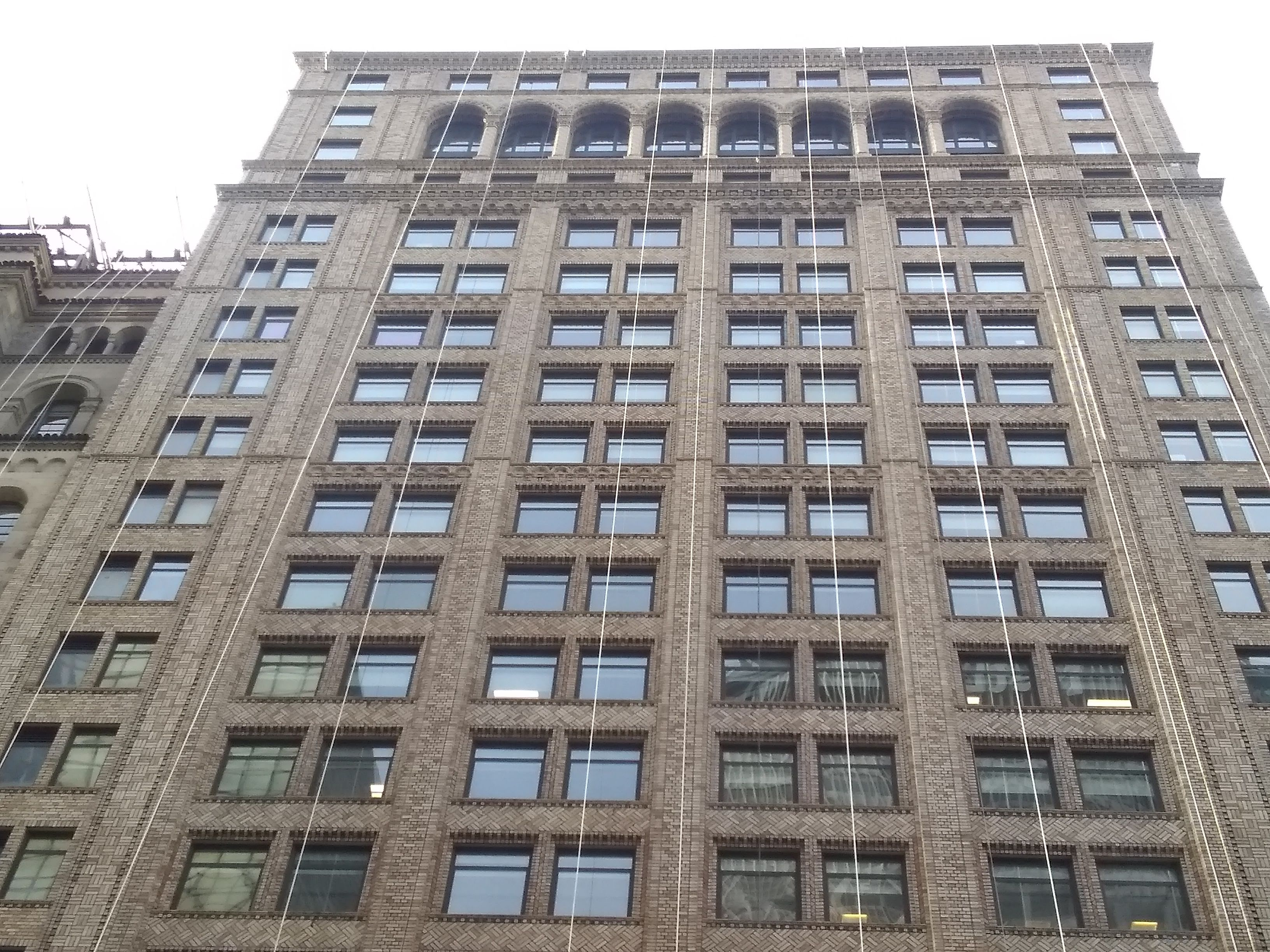
Seen from 42nd Street

The building was designed in the Romanesque Revival style by the firms of Sloan & Robertson and York & Sawyer. The design shares many elements with 110 East 42nd Street directly to the east, which was also designed by York & Sawyer.

=== Form ===
John Sloan's plan for the Pershing Square Building called for a U-shaped tower above a five-story rectangular base, used in many other New York City skyscrapers erected before the 1916 Zoning Resolution. Above that would be a 14-story middle section, with a recessed "light court" on the eighth floor, followed by a five-story top section and two recessed attic floors. The original plans called for shops and restaurants in the first floor and basement.

The design was later changed to fit with the neighboring 110 East 42nd Street. As ultimately built, the structure rises from a square seven-story base with three-story-high decorative arches on the lowest three floors. The tower above the seventh floor continues in a U-shaped configuration to the top floor. The second floor would be 30 feet (9.1 m) high and would be used as a banking floor. The 20 floors above it were to be used as office floors. The wall between the Pershing Square Building and 110 East 42nd was made of hollow tile, as a brick wall would have been too heavy for the foundation, and would have necessitated the removal of the top five or six stories of both buildings.

Sloan also had to design the top floors in order to meet the conditions that the BSA had set in exchange for allowing the Pershing Square Building's zoning variance. For instance, since the cornice could not project more than 1 foot (30 cm) from the building lot line, Sloan's design incorporated corbelling at the top of the facade, and a setback two-story attic above the 23rd floor. The 24th-floor attic is located about 7 feet (2.1 m) behind the building boundary and mostly consists of one story with a hip roof. There are also gable-roofed 25th-story penthouses at 41st and 42nd Streets. The attics, with their roofs made of red tiles, resembled "a villa on the hilltop", as described by architect Charles Downing Lay.

=== Facade ===
The building facade is clad in beige brick, with elaborate decoration designed by Sloan and produced by the Atlantic Terra Cotta Company. The facade contains a similar color to that of 110 East 42nd Street, with tan-gray Ohio sandstone cladding, as well as similar arcades, vertical strips, and cornice design. Sloan's mixture of Romanesque and Renaissance Lombard detailing on the Pershing Square Building contrasted with the near-exclusive use of Italian Romanesque details on 110 East 42nd's facade. Architectural critic Francisco Mujica described the Pershing Square Building as being among the "first skyscrapers in which brick cladding was used for decorative purposes", and the unprecedented material usage led the New York City Department of Buildings to publish a special report on the facade.

The decorated terracotta tiles were manufactured by Atlantic Terra Cotta, which used small pieces to provide a similarity with the brick cladding. Atlantic Terra Cotta roughened the terracotta pieces before burning them so that they would appear to be a rough surface. The tiles' colors were characterized by Atlantic Terra Cotta's journal as "a soft gray fire-flashed with golden brown". The color spotting was meant to "tone the marked variations down into a softly harmonious play of color".

Much of the ornamentation is located at the base, particularly around the banking facility on the second floor. These decorations include columns whose capitals depict dolphins, shields, and eagles. One of the figures at the fifth-floor level represents a Roman caduceator, or peace commissioner. He holds a caduceus in one hand as an emblem of office and, in the other, a cornucopia to suggest the benefits of a prospective peace.

=== Subway entrance ===
The New York City Subway's Grand Central–42nd Street station, serving the 4, 5, 6, <6>, 7, <7>, and S trains, is located directly underneath the northwest corner of the Pershing Square Building. Within the building, two stairs lead from Park Avenue to the subway station.

== History ==
In 1913, the Dual Contracts were signed by the Interborough Rapid Transit Company (IRT) and the Brooklyn–Manhattan Transit Corporation (BMT), two companies who operated parts of the present New York City Subway. A set of platforms at Grand Central, now serving the IRT Lexington Avenue Line (4, 5, 6, and <6> trains), was to be built diagonally under the building site as part of the agreement. At the time, the site under the proposed station was occupied by Grand Union Hotel, which was condemned via eminent domain in February 1914. The condemnation proceedings for the hotel cost $3.5 million (equal to $78.3 million in 2024 (Note: Johnston, Louis; Williamson, Samuel H. (2023). "What Was the U.S. GDP Then?". MeasuringWorth. United States Gross Domestic Product deflator figures follow the MeasuringWorth series.)). To pay the station's construction cost, the Public Service Commission approved the construction of a 25-story building above the station. By May 1915, the building site had been excavated for the construction of the building. Despite the passage of the 1916 Zoning Resolution, which required architectural setbacks to provide light to the streets below, the building plans conformed with the older zoning codes, which did not require setbacks.

Though the IRT Lexington Avenue Line's 42nd Street station opened in 1918, the site above the station was not developed as planned. The 25-story building's site, and the portion of Park Avenue immediately adjacent to it, was renamed Pershing Square in 1919 to honor World War I general John J. Pershing. The site was then proposed for use as an open plaza with a three-story memorial "Victory Hall", but the idea of a victory hall was opposed by Fiorello H. La Guardia, president of the New York City Board of Aldermen. The Transit Commission attempted to sell the building site in May 1920 for $2.8 million (equal to $33.1 million in 2024), but no one placed a bid. Then in July 1920, a realty consortium headed by investor Henry Mandel (Note: Mandel was later known for constructing other projects such as the London Terrace apartment complex in Chelsea, Manhattan) offered $2.9 million for the hotel (equal to $34.3 million in 2024), a proposal that was accepted. Other members of this consortium included the accountant Samuel D. Leidesdorf.

=== Planning and construction ===
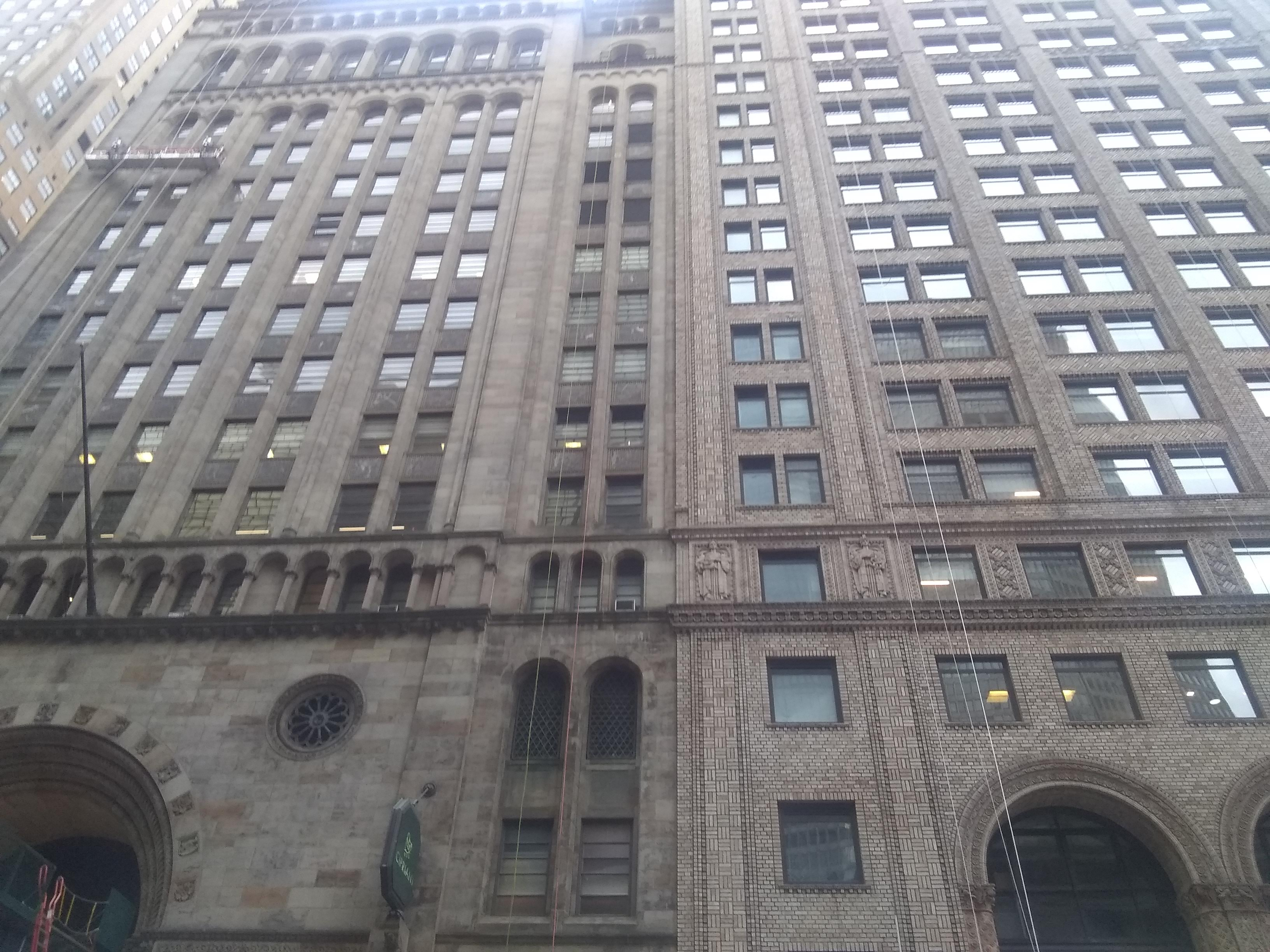
110 East 42nd Street (left) and the Pershing Square Building (right) share what was believed to be New York City's tallest party wall

By September 1920, Mandel had created the Pershing Square Building Corporation, of which he was majority stockholder. The corporation was headed by Leidesdorf. In January 1921, the Pershing Square Building Corporation received title to the site, with conditions that necessitated a subway entrance and a maximum building height and weight. Mandel gave the Bowery Savings Bank the eastern half of the hotel site, which would be developed into an office building at 110 East 42nd Street. As per the purchase agreement between the bank and the corporation, the structures were to contain interlocking structures, including what was believed to be the city's tallest party wall separating two buildings.

Mandel hired architect John Sloan to create a design for a building, and Sloan had submitted preliminary plans by May 1921. According to Sloan's plans, the structure would contain no setbacks, contravening the 1916 Zoning Resolution. Though the Fifth Avenue Association filed a complaint with the city's Board of Standards and Appeals (BSA) to enforce the zoning code, Sloan stated that the inclusion of setbacks would be structurally unsafe, expensive, as well as a contravention of the existing agreement. The BSA ruled in favor of the Pershing Square Building Corporation, as the footings had been laid before the zoning resolution was passed. As such, the Pershing Square Building was the last tall building constructed after the 1916 Zoning Resolution that did not contain setbacks or a front plaza.

The firm York and Sawyer was designated as the building's new primary architects in September 1921, and Sloan received a $10,000 payment and architectural credit in return for giving his drawings to York and Sawyer (equivalent to $139,000 in 2024). The architects were also designing the adjacent 110 East 42nd Street. By the next month, the plans were finalized, and construction was imminent. That month, the opponents appealed the BSA's decision to the statewide Court of Appeals. In April 1922, S.W. Straus & Co. underwrote a $6 million mortgage loan for the building (equal to $86 million in 2024). By then, excavation had been nearly completed, and the first lessees had already signed for space in the building. John York of York & Sawyer then requested that Sloan remain on the project to devise the preliminary plans. Sloan later sued York & Sawyer over the latter's failure to pay compensation, resulting in a $14,260 architect's fee being paid out to Sloan in 1928 (equivalent to $205,000 in 2024). Sloan would form a partnership with Thomas Markoe Robertson in 1923, and in addition to co-designing the Pershing Square Building, the pair would design the Pershing Square Building and several other New York City structures, including the Chanin Building and Graybar Building in the Grand Central area.

=== Later history ===
When the Pershing Square Building was completed in 1923, it immediately became popular among tenants. A mezzanine above the second floor, also designed by Sloan, was added in 1924 when Pacific Bank rented space in the building. The following year, in 1925, real estate operator Louis Frankel filed a lawsuit in the New York Supreme Court against Samuel Leidesdorf, alleging that he had been denied the profits from the Pershing Square Building's construction, and sought to have all ownership interests in the Pershing Square Building Corporation transferred to him. The State Supreme Court subsequently ruled against Frankel.

The Pershing Square Building was renamed the Continental Can Building when the American Can Company leased space in the 24th and 25th floors in 1945. This name was dropped in 1970, and the following year the Leidesdorf estate sold the Pershing Square Building to Prudential Financial. In 1977, Prudential sold the building to an anonymous West German investor for $24 million (about $97 million in 2024) by transferring ownership to Suttom NV, a company based in the Netherlands Antilles. After Suttom NV sold the building in 1994, it passed through numerous ownerships, including GE Capital (1994), 125 Park Avenue LLC (1997); GE Capital subsidiary Watch Holdings LLC (1998); and Sri Six Operating Company (2004). The real estate firm Shorenstein Properties had a stake in Sri Six. SL Green purchased the building in 2010 from Shorenstein Properties.

The Pershing Square Building received several renovations, especially in the 1990s and 2000s. The upper floors' masonry and windows were replaced; the ground-level facades at Park Avenue and 42nd Street were renovated; and the lobby was renovated with a new 42nd Street entrance in 2006–2008. The New York City Landmarks Preservation Commission (LPC) hosted public hearings in 2013 to determine whether the Pershing Square Building and four other structures in East Midtown should be designated as New York City landmarks. SL Green opposed a potential landmark designation for the Pershing Square Building and the nearby Graybar Building, which it also owned, saying that the designations would prevent SL Green from improving access to the Grand Central–42nd Street station. In mid-2016, the LPC proposed protecting twelve buildings in East Midtown, including the Graybar Building, in advance of proposed changes to the area's zoning. On November 22, 2016, the LPC designated the Pershing Square Building and ten other nearby buildings as city landmarks.

== Tenants ==
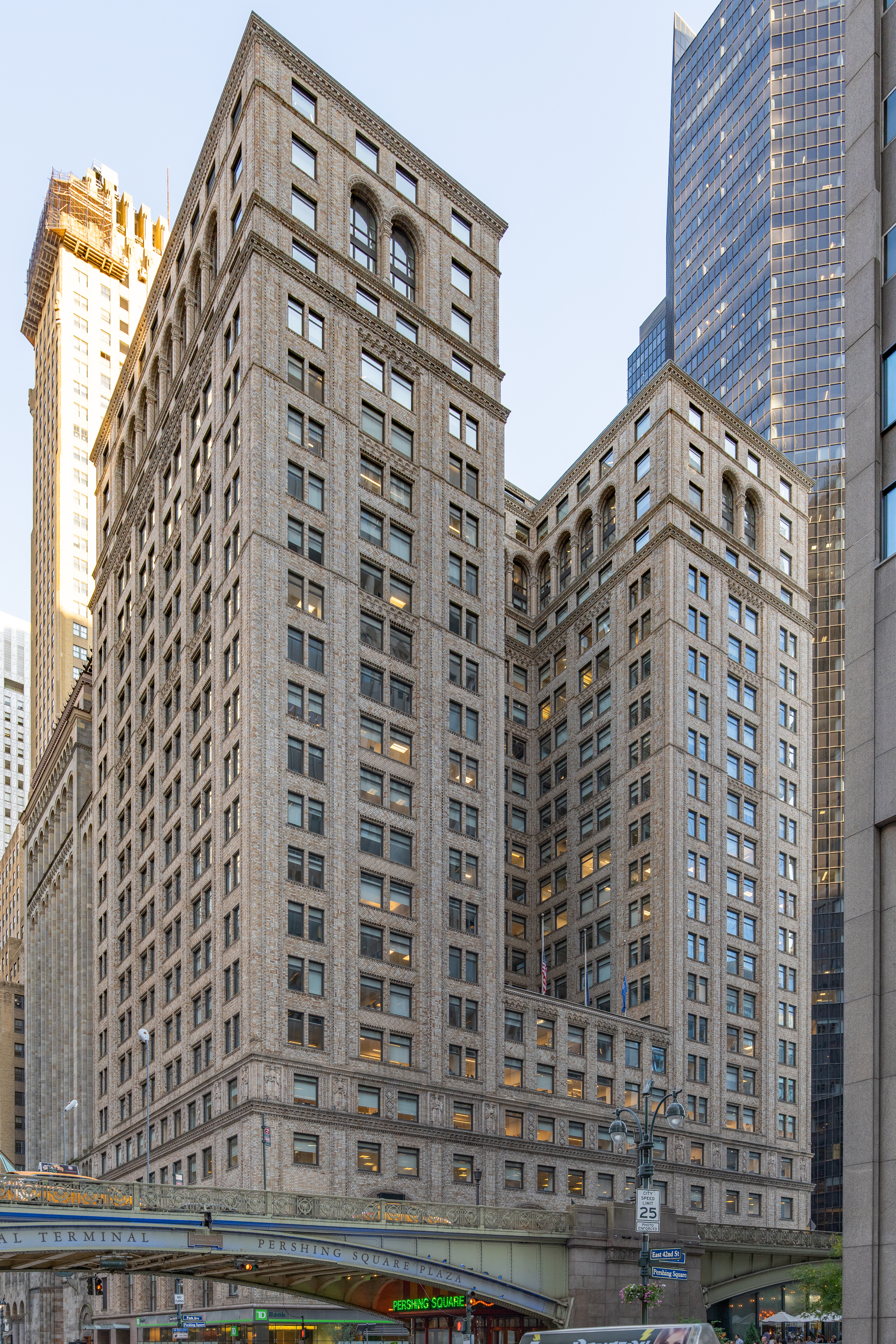
View from 42nd Street and Vanderbilt Avenue, looking toward the western facade

A New-York Tribune article in January 1923 stated that, although the Pershing Square Building was not complete yet, its space was 60% leased. At the time, the lessees included International Paper and the Royal Baking Powder Company, as well as York & Sawyer's own offices. The second-floor banking space was leased by Pacific Bank in 1924, and the company added a mezzanine above the existing hall. Attorneys, realtors, and insurance and investment companies also took space in the building, as did those in the architecture and building construction industry.

The Pershing Square Building served as a hub or offices for several transportation companies in the bus and aviation industries. In 1929, the Baltimore and Ohio Railroad started using the Pershing Square Building as one of its waiting rooms for intercity buses, after its previous terminal at Pennsylvania Station had closed down. Besides American Airlines, other airlines such as Trans-Canada Air Lines and Northwest Airlines also rented space in the building. Manhattan Air Terminal, Inc. opened an airline ticket office in the Pershing Square Building's banking room mezzanine in 1972, selling tickets for flights on various airlines.

There were numerous tenants who took space in the Pershing Square Building for several decades. These included Pacific Bank, who occupied the second and second-mezzanine floors starting in 1924; American Maize Products Company, which moved into the building in 1929; the company of advertiser William Esty, which rented the entire 23rd floor in 1930; and the executive offices of American Airlines, which rented four floors in 1943. From 1945 to 1970, the building was named for the American Can Company, who took up the 24th and 25th floors.

The electronics company Philips started occupying space in the Pershing Square Building in the 1950s and still retained a presence in the building in 2016. Pandora Media and Robert Half International were among the other relatively recent companies who took space in the building, while Canon USA subsidiary MCS Business Solutions moved its headquarters to 125 Park Avenue in 1998. The furniture company Haworth moved to the Pershing Square Building in 2007, taking up the former banking floor and airline ticket office on the second floor and mezzanine.

== Critical reception ==
The Pershing Square Building's brick-clad facade was unprecedented at the time of its construction. The architect Robert A. M. Stern, in his book New York 1930, called the use of brick ornamentation on the Pershing Square Building's brick facade "increasingly important" as the Lombard Revival architectural movement grew in New York City in later years.

Later reviews were more critical; in 2013, the Real Estate Board of New York published a report claiming that the Pershing Square Building's design "was old-fashioned even before it was finished". Real Estate Weekly said in July 2016, prior to the building's landmark designation that November, that "The building is notably absent from the AIA Guide for New York City", a guidebook of architecturally significant structures in New York City.
