= Chanin Building =

Office skyscraper in Manhattan, New York

- U.S. National Register of Historic Places
- New York State Register of Historic Places
- New York City Landmark
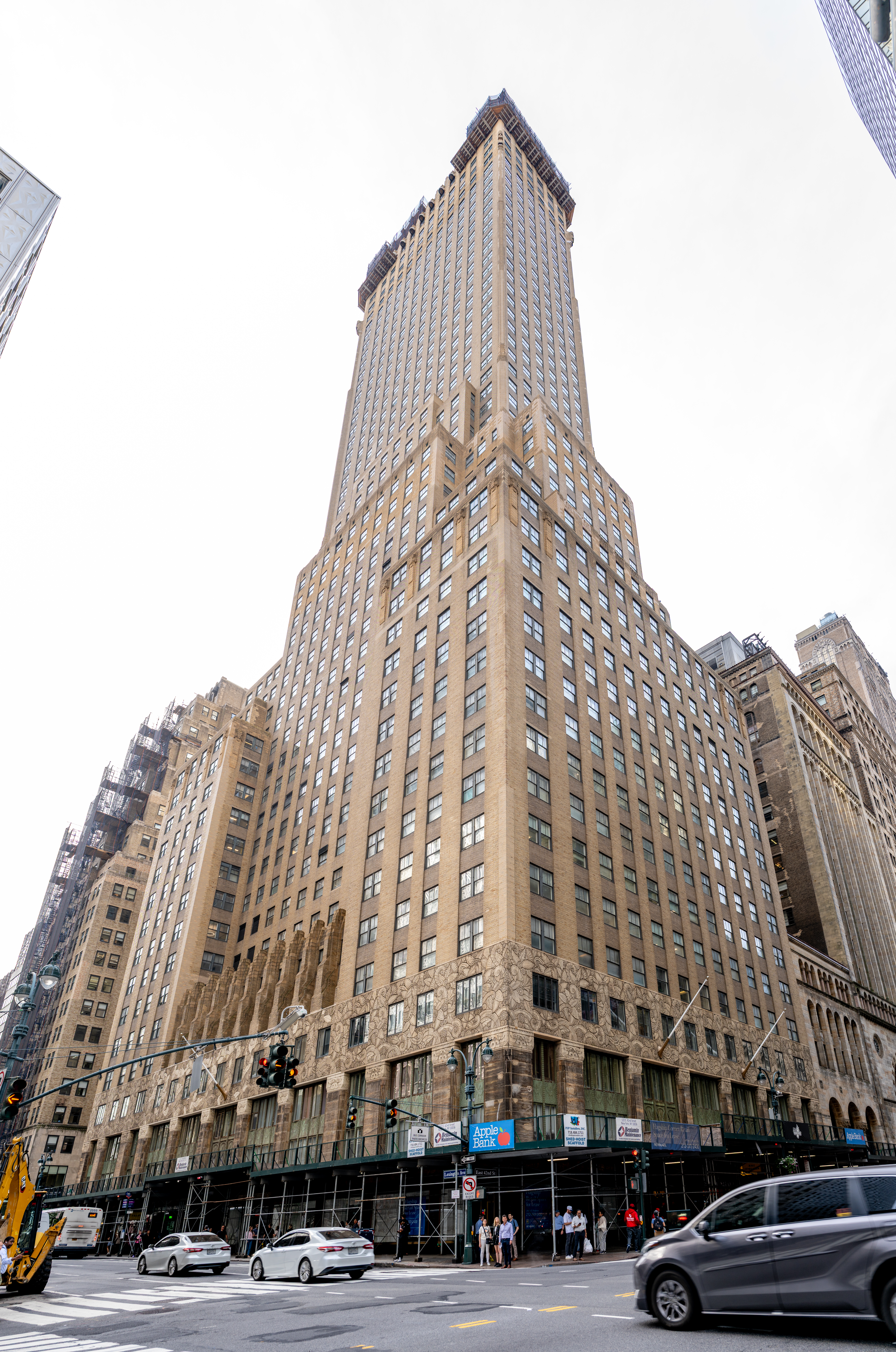
- The Chanin Building as seen in 2025
- Location: 122 East 42nd Street; Manhattan, New York, U.S.
- Coordinates: 40°45′04″N 73°58′36″W
- Built: 1927–1929
- Architect: Sloan & Robertson; Rene Chambellan
- Architectural style: Art Deco
- NRHP reference No.: 80002676
- NYSRHP No.: 06101.000626
- NYCL No.: 0993

Significant dates
- Added to NRHP: April 23, 1980
- Designated NYSRHP: June 23, 1980
- Designated NYCL: November 14, 1978

The Chanin Building (/ˈtʃænɪn/ CHAN-in (Note: This pronunciation is noted in other discussions of Chanin's work. See, for example: "Majestic". Spotlight on Broadway.)), also known as 122 East 42nd Street, is a 56-story office skyscraper in Midtown Manhattan in New York City, New York, U.S. It is on the southwest corner of 42nd Street and Lexington Avenue, near Grand Central Terminal to the north and adjacent to 110 East 42nd Street to the west. The building is named for Irwin S. Chanin, its developer.

The structure was designed in the Art Deco style by John Sloan and T. Markoe Robertson of the firm Sloan & Robertson, with the assistance of Chanin's architect Jacques Delamarre. It incorporates architectural sculpture by Rene Paul Chambellan, as well as a facade of brick and terracotta. The skyscraper reaches 680 feet (210 m), with a 649-foot-tall (198 m) roof topped by a 31-foot (9.4 m) spire. The Chanin Building includes numerous setbacks to conform with the 1916 Zoning Resolution.

The Chanin Building was constructed in 1927–1929 on the site of a warehouse, one of the last remaining undeveloped sites around Grand Central Terminal. Upon opening, the building was almost fully rented, and it was the third-tallest building in New York City. Over the years, the upper floors have contained a movie theater, observation deck, and radio broadcast station, while the lower floors were used as offices and a bus terminal. The building was designated a New York City landmark in 1978, and was added to the National Register of Historic Places in 1980.

== Site ==
The building is at 122 East 42nd Street in the Midtown and Murray Hill neighborhoods of Manhattan in New York City, New York, U.S. It is bounded by Lexington Avenue to the east, 42nd Street to the north, and 41st Street to the south. The lot measures 125 feet (38 m) along 42nd Street, 175 feet (53 m) along 41st Street, and 197.5 feet (60.2 m) along Lexington Avenue. The building is assigned its own ZIP Code, 10168; it was one of 41 buildings in Manhattan that had their own ZIP Codes as of 2019.

The Chanin Building is part of the Terminal City area around Grand Central Terminal; directly to the west are 110 East 42nd Street and the Pershing Square Building. The Grand Hyatt New York hotel is located across 42nd Street, while the Socony-Mobil Building is located across Lexington Avenue and the Chrysler Building is diagonally across both streets.

== Architecture ==
The Chanin Building was designed by Sloan & Robertson in the Art Deco style. Though the exterior contains a relatively muted design, the interior contains ample ornament. The building is 649 feet (198 m) tall to its roof, or 680 feet (210 m) tall when including its spire; it contains 56 stories. The Chanin Building's massing influenced that of other skyscrapers in New York City, including the Wall and Hanover Building, 444 Madison Avenue, and 22 East 40th Street. The design was mostly the work of Rene Paul Chambellan and Jacques Delamarre. The former specialized in architectural sculpture in numerous styles, such as the Art Deco style, while the latter led the staff of the Chanin Company.

=== Form ===
The Chanin Building employs a series of setbacks that end in a "vigorous, toothed" pinnacle. Because of the varying widths of the surrounding streets, three separate groups of setbacks were mandated for each elevation of the facade as per the 1916 Zoning Resolution. This led critic Matlack Price to write the Chanin Building was "design[ed] in masses rather than in facades". The Chanin Building's massing was inspired by that of Eliel Saarinen's unbuilt proposal for Chicago's Tribune Tower. Though the building is primarily designed in the Art Deco style, the massing also exhibits design characteristics of the International Style.

The lowest four stories occupy the entire land lot. Along the north elevation on 42nd Street and the south elevation on 41st Street, the entirety of the facade is set back at a uniform depth. The central bays of the eastern elevation on Lexington Avenue are set back at the fifth story, while the outer bays continue upward without setting back. According to one writer, this made the Lexington Avenue elevation appear as a "giant medieval two-towered facade". The subsequent stories form a jagged "pyramid", with setbacks above the 17th, 30th, and 52nd stories.

=== Facade ===
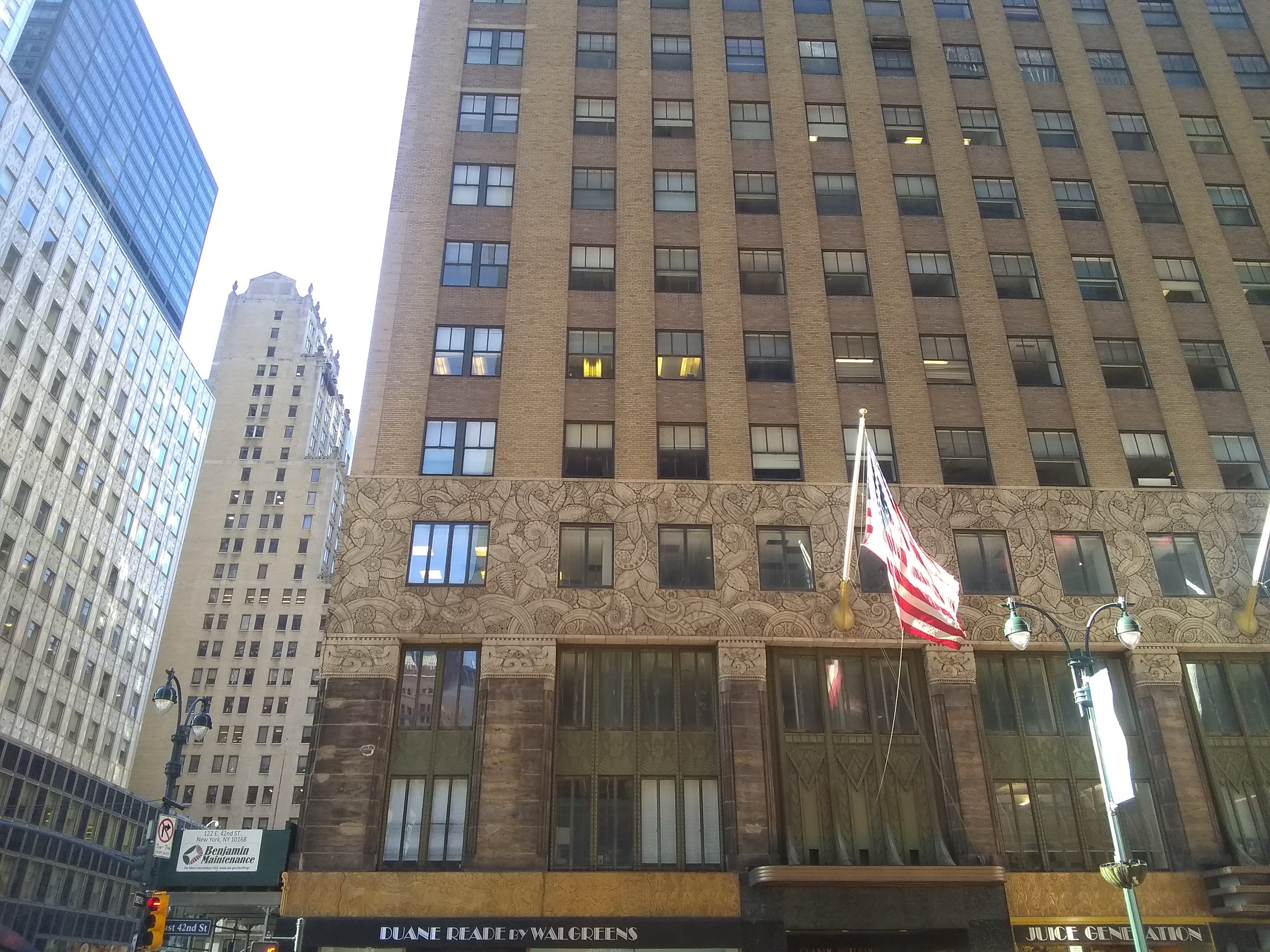
Lower section of the facade, as seen from across 42nd Street; the Socony-Mobil Building is visible at left

The Chanin Building is clad with buff brick, limestone, and terracotta. The facade also contains bronze, marble, and custom-designed colored glass ornament. There are three entrances to the building's office stories, which are ornamented with eight plaster reliefs of personified figures against a geometric pattern. Two of the reliefs symbolize achievement and success, while the other six depict physical and mental attributes by which those objectives are attained. The base of the building bears black Belgian marble around the storefront windows, which are each made of plate glass. These storefront windows correspond to two bays on upper stories, allowing for wide displays. Directly above, a bronze frieze depicts scenes of evolution, ranging from simple organisms to more complex animals and plants. A second terracotta frieze runs the whole length of the lower facade, presenting a dramatic collection of angular zigzags and curvy leaves. A bas-relief by Edward Trumbull, designed in the Art Deco style, wraps around the facade.

The facade continues upward in relatively simple tones. The second and third floors include bronze-framed groups of triple-paned windows, with bronze Art Deco spandrel panels between the floors. Each grouping is separated by vertical piers made of limestone, topped by elaborate capitals. The fourth story is faced with ornate terracotta panels depicting plants, evoking the stylized forms common in the Art Deco style. There are buttresses on the fifth and sixth stories of the Lexington Avenue elevation's central bays, as well as at the corners of the 30th through 49th stories. The crown, above the Chanin Company's 52nd-story offices, contains abstract-patterned projecting ornamentation, with buttresses outside the 53rd floor.

Originally, 212 artificial candles at the crown of the Chanin Building provided the equivalent of 30 million candlepower. These lights, meant to highlight the details of the building, were characteristic of the Art Deco style; on cloudless nights, they could be seen from more than 40 miles (64 km) away. They had been toned down by the late twentieth century. The lights are no longer in use but remain in place. During the daytime, the building's crown appeared as a solid mass.

=== Interior ===
==== Lobby ====
The lobby is accessed by passageways from 42nd and 41st Streets, with a side entrance from Lexington Avenue. The lobby is decorated in a "modernistic" style themed around "The City of Opportunity". Eight bronze reliefs, designed by Chambellan, perch above ornate bronze radiator grilles. The grilles depict four categories of physical and mental life. The bronze ornamentation continues in the waves on the floor, mailboxes, and elevator doors, extending the general Art Deco style from the outside inward. The lobby also contains other ornamentation such as terrazzo floors with bronze inlays, as well as tan marble walls. Originally, the floors had lozenge-shaped panels, but heavy pedestrian traffic wore down these panels over the years.

Marble stairs lead to the basement where there are connections to Grand Central Terminal and the New York City Subway's Grand Central–42nd Street station. Also inside are 21 high speed passenger elevators, split up into three elevator banks, as well as one service elevator. When the building opened, the first floor, mezzanine, and second floor were used by banks and other commercial concerns. The storefronts opened both inward into the lobby and outward onto the sidewalk. The storefront windows in the lobby are more ornate versions of those outside.

The lobby originally contained a "palatial" bus terminal operated by the Baltimore and Ohio Railroad. The terminal was outfitted with marble surfaces and also contained waiting rooms and ticket offices. Buses would pull onto a revolving turntable within the terminal, which received boarding passengers on one side and deposited alighting passengers on the other. The coach terminal closed after the railroad discontinued all passenger service north of Baltimore in 1958.

==== Upper floors ====
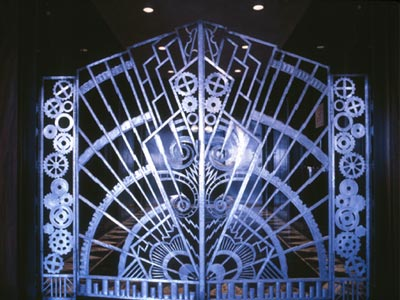
Designed by Rene Paul Chambellan, these gates led to the private offices of Irwin S. Chanin

The third through 48th floors consist almost entirely of leasable office space, while the 49th and 50th floors contain the Chanin brothers' boardroom and offices. When completed, the 50th floor also had a small movie theater (known as the Chanin Auditorium), later converted into the Chanin Organization's offices. Decorated in black and silver, the auditorium had 200 seats across two levels. It also had a stage and projection booth, allowing the venue to be used for films, plays, concerts, and radio shows. In addition, tenants used the auditorium for meetings, and the space also held conferences and conventions.

The floors above were originally the offices of the Chanin Organization, with an Art Deco restroom that a building trade convention's judges referred to as "America's finest bathroom". This bathroom was decorated in orange and white, and it contained etched-glass shower panels and brass fixtures. Irwin Chanin's 52nd-story offices were accessed through a set of wrought-iron gates designed by Chambellan. The gates are decorated with symbols of "the spirit of modern industry", such as cog wheels and coins. There were bronze vector grilles within the office. Chanin also decorated his offices with wrought brass and iron; etched glass; and several types of marbles, woods, and leathers. His reception room had complementary furniture and wall paneling, as well as recessed ceiling lamps. The reception room also contains illuminated panels depicting areas in which Chanin was an active developer, such as bridges, skyscrapers, Broadway theaters, and rapid transit.

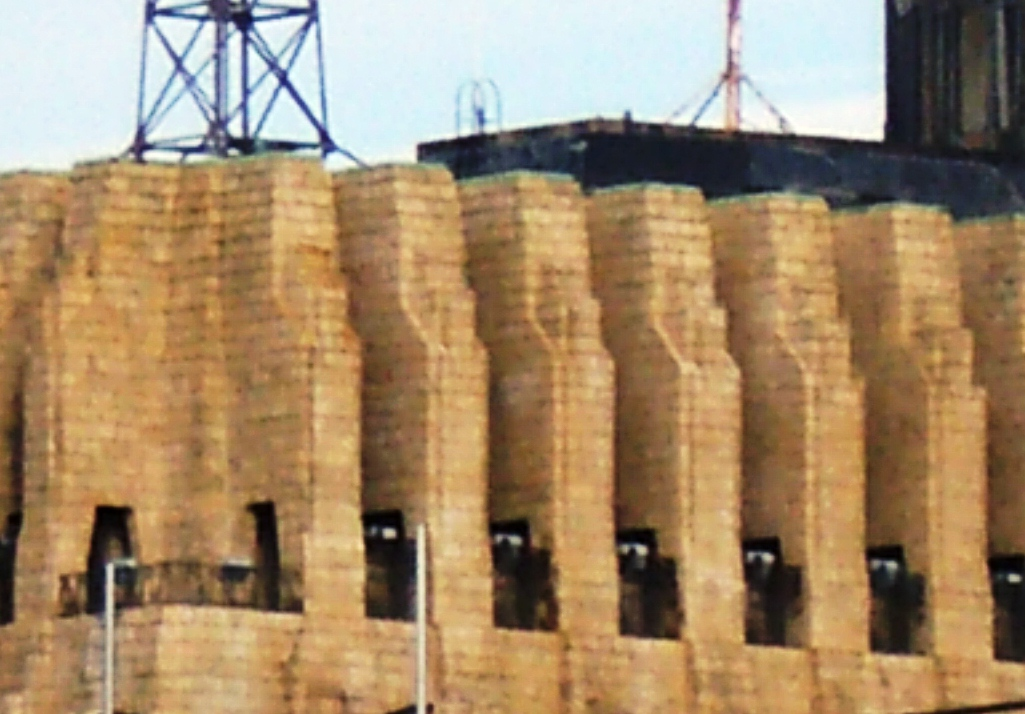
Close-up of the embrasures at the Chanin Building's crenellated top

As a dominant landmark in the midtown skyline upon its opening, the building had an open-air observation deck on the 54th floor. It was one of three open-air observatories in the city following World War II, the others being at 30 Rockefeller Plaza and at the Empire State Building, though there had been several other observation decks in the city prior to the war. The Chanin Building only charged 25 cents for admission, since it was not as well known as the other two buildings with outdoor observatories. Over the years, several people have committed suicide by jumping off the 54th floor observation deck. In later years, other nearby buildings surpassed the Chanin Building in height (including the Chrysler Building, diagonally across Lexington Avenue and 42nd Street), and so the observation deck was closed in the mid-20th century.

The top of the building was used as a transmission site for WQXR-FM starting on December 15, 1941, when it was relocated from Long Island City in Queens. In 1965, the transmitter was moved to the Empire State Building.

== History ==
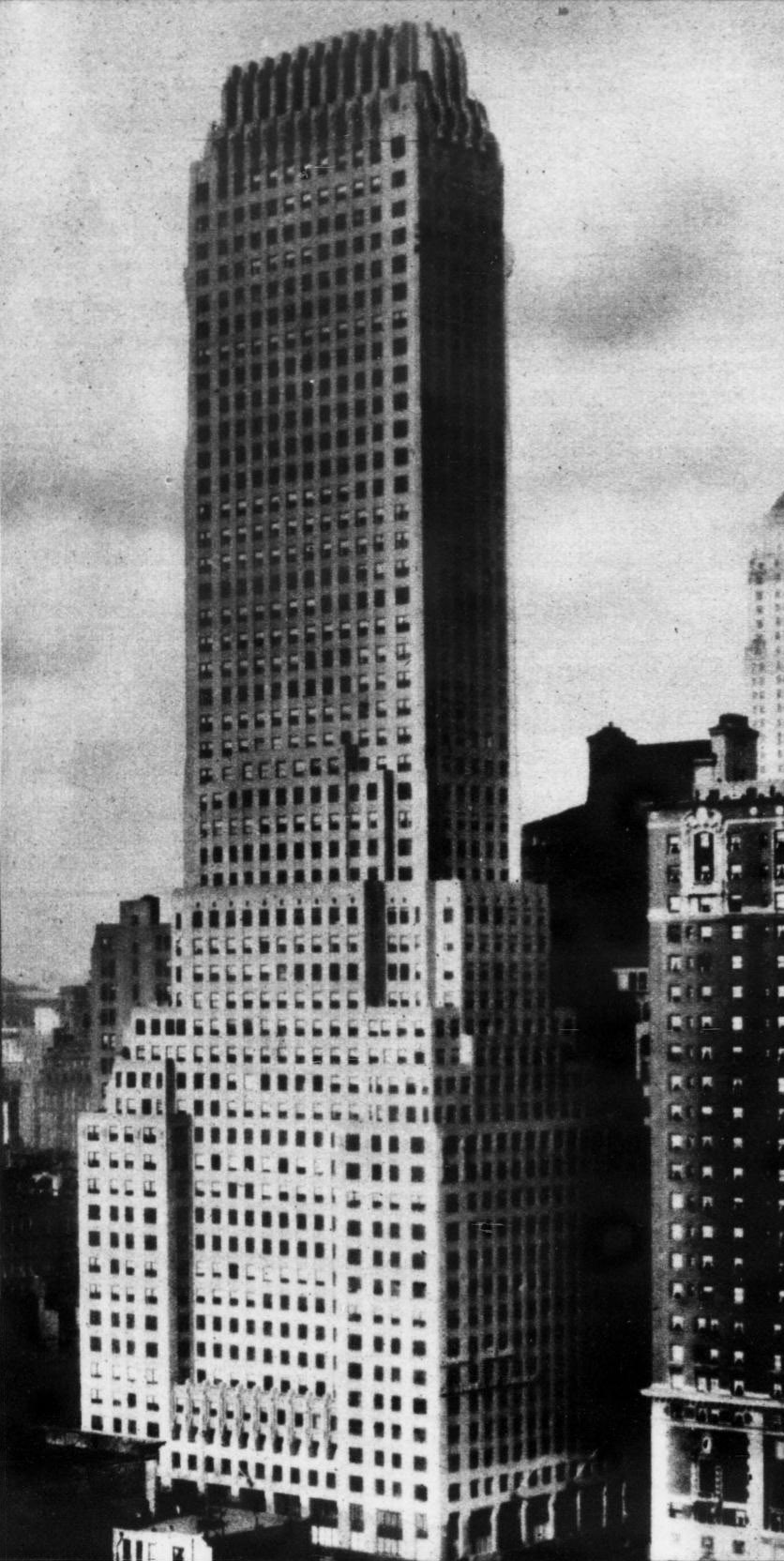
Chanin Building upon completion in 1929

The completion of the underground Grand Central Terminal in 1913 resulted in the rapid development of Terminal City, the area around Grand Central, as well as a corresponding increase in real-estate prices. Among these were the New York Central Building at 47th Street and Park Avenue, as well as the Grand Central Palace across 42nd Street from the present Chanin Building. By 1920, the area had become what The New York Times called "a great civic centre". One site that had yet to be redeveloped was the Manhattan Storage Warehouse, which was built in 1882 and still occupied the site of the Chanin Building.

Irwin Chanin was an American architect and real estate developer who designed several Art Deco towers and Broadway theaters. He and his brother Henry I. Chanin designed their first Manhattan buildings in 1924. They then built and operated a number of theaters and other structures related to the entertainment industry, including the Roxy Theatre and the Hotel Lincoln. Chanin believed the area around Grand Central Terminal had potential for growth because of the construction of hotels and apartment buildings at Tudor City, Sutton Place, and Lexington and Park Avenues.

=== Development ===
The first plan for a skyscraper at the Chanin Building site was made in 1925, when a developer proposed a 35-story skyscraper. The Chanins took over an existing 105-year leasehold for the land underneath the Manhattan Storage Warehouse in August 1926. The Chanin brothers initially planned to erect a bulky square 45-story tower designed by Rouse & Goldstone.

The brothers still had a reputation for being involved mostly in the theater industry. According to one author, when the Chanins started clearing the site in 1927, many members of the general public could not tell "whether the Chanins were builders or [...] theater-owners who had taken up building as a sideline." The warehouse itself was difficult to clear, since its 5-foot-thick (1.5 m) walls had been designed to protect against "burglary, fire and assault". The process entailed clearing away 7,500 truck loads of brick, 1,000 of scrap metal, and 3,500 of loose earth. The official plans for the Chanin Building were filed with the New York City Department of Buildings in June 1927, at which point 60 percent of the warehouse had been demolished. Sloan & Robertson, architects of the nearby Graybar Building, Pershing Square Building, and 110 East 42nd Street, were hired to design the Chanin Building.

Once the foundation had been laid, the first steel columns were installed in January 1928, with Irwin S. Chanin driving in the first rivet. The steel frame weighed an estimated 15,000 short tons (13,000 long tons) and was held together by 1.5 million rivets and 160,000 bolts. Crowds frequently stopped to observe the construction process. The erection of the frame was not without problems: in one incident, the boom of a construction derrick fell from the 20th floor, nearly splitting a truck in half, though no one was injured or killed. The steelwork was completed by that June, and as was tradition at the time, two gold rivets for the Chanin Building were driven into the frame on July 2 to mark this event. The building held its topping out ceremony in August 1928.

=== Usage ===
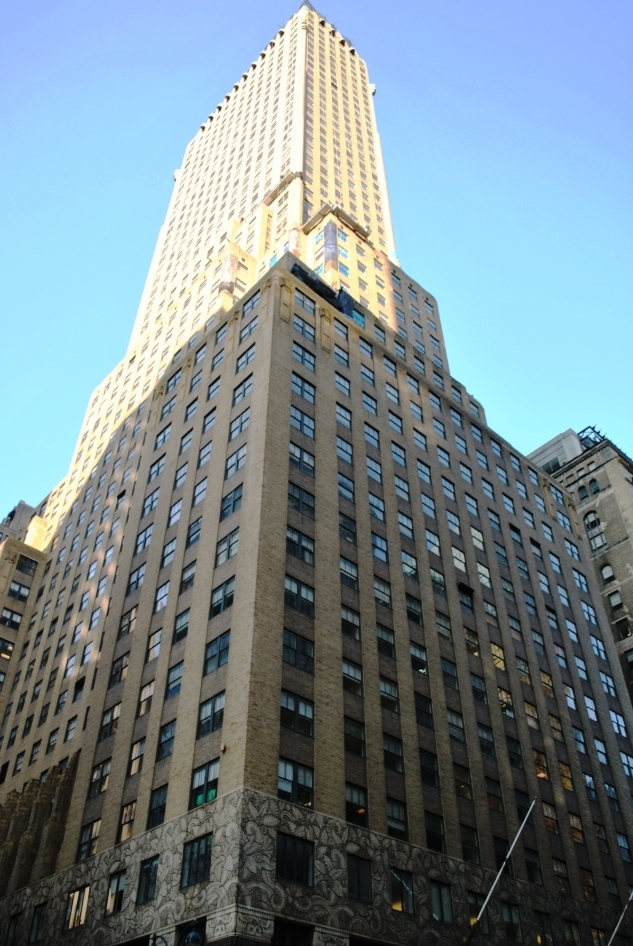
Viewed from beside the Chrysler Building, on the opposite corner of Lexington Avenue and 42nd Street

The structure was declared complete on January 23, 1929, exactly one year after the first rivet had been driven into the building. It opened January 29 at an estimated cost of $12-14 million, with an informal opening attended by mayor Jimmy Walker. The Chanin Building thus became the first major skyscraper in Terminal City, and the third-tallest building in New York City behind the Woolworth Building and the Metropolitan Life Insurance Company Tower. The Chanin Building had more floors than the Woolworth, despite being 112 feet (34 m) shorter. Though the Chanin Building was later surpassed in height by other buildings, including the adjacent 1,046-foot (319 m) Chrysler Building that opened a year later, Irwin Chanin was instead focused on attracting tenants with an "efficient, up-to-date" facility.

Upon opening, the Chanin Building was almost fully rented. The builders projected that by September 1, 1929, the building would be 70 percent rented, though the actual occupancy rate at that date was 92%. Furthermore, in 1930, The New York Times reported that 95 percent of the structure's 710,000 square feet (66,000 m^{2}) was occupied by 9,000 workers. Initially, the lobby space was occupied by the Baltimore and Ohio Railroad's bus terminal, ticket offices, and waiting rooms. The office space included such tenants as the Kimberly-Clark paper company, Pan American Petroleum and Transport Company, and Fairchild Aircraft, while the Chanin company took all the space above the 50th floor. In addition, the Sterling National Bank took up much of the mezzanine space on the Lexington Avenue side, and a self-service and table-service restaurant opened in the basement. Through the Great Depression, leasing proceeded actively.

The building's owners filed to reorganize the operations of the Lexington Avenue and 42nd Street Corporation, which operated the Chanin Building, in 1947. In subsequent years, the Chanin Building continued to attract tenants such as Guest Keen and Nettlefolds, a Howard Johnson's restaurant, and the Barry Goldwater 1964 presidential campaign's New York state headquarters. In addition, the building hosted U.S. Chess Championships. Despite this success, the Chanin Building faced some issues: its owners, along with those of the Nelson Tower and Century Apartments, were charged with real estate tax fraud in 1974. The Chanin Building's owners were estimated to have evaded $138,549 in real estate taxes.

The Chanin Building was designated a city landmark by the New York City Landmarks Preservation Commission in 1978, and was added to the National Register of Historic Places in 1980. By the 1990s, the building was owned by a syndicate headed by Stanley Stahl. Modern tenants include Apple Bank, of which Stahl was the only stockholder, as well as the International Rescue Committee, which had moved to the building in 1994.

== Critical reception ==
Shortly after the building's completion, architectural critic Matlack Price wrote in an Architectural Forum article that the building was "a splendid contribution to the architecture of all time", and that "The architects have not here compromised a fine vision either with major errors in scale or with minor trivialities." A promotional brochure, with artwork by Hugh Ferriss, described the Chanin Building as the "mise en scène for the romantic drama of American business." Paul Goldberger of The New York Times said that the Chanin Building was "one of the pre-eminent pieces of American Art Deco—a gracefully ornamented, 56-story slab". The fifth edition of the AIA Guide to New York City, published in 2010, characterized the Chanin Building as being "classic style, rather than stylish ephemera. Such distinguished self-improvement seems beyond the grasp of current developers."

The interior design of the building was also praised. Herbert Muschamp wrote in 1992 that the Chanin Building "tells a story of New York as the legendary beacon for immigrants", and that its numerous amenities "were integral to the Chanin Building's drama". Historian Donald L. Miller stated, "Restrained on the outside, the inside is exuberantly ornate".

== See also ==
- Art Deco architecture of New York City
- List of tallest buildings in New York City
- List of New York City Designated Landmarks in Manhattan from 14th to 59th Streets
- National Register of Historic Places listings in Manhattan from 14th to 59th Streets
