= 110 East 42nd Street =

Office building in Manhattan, New York

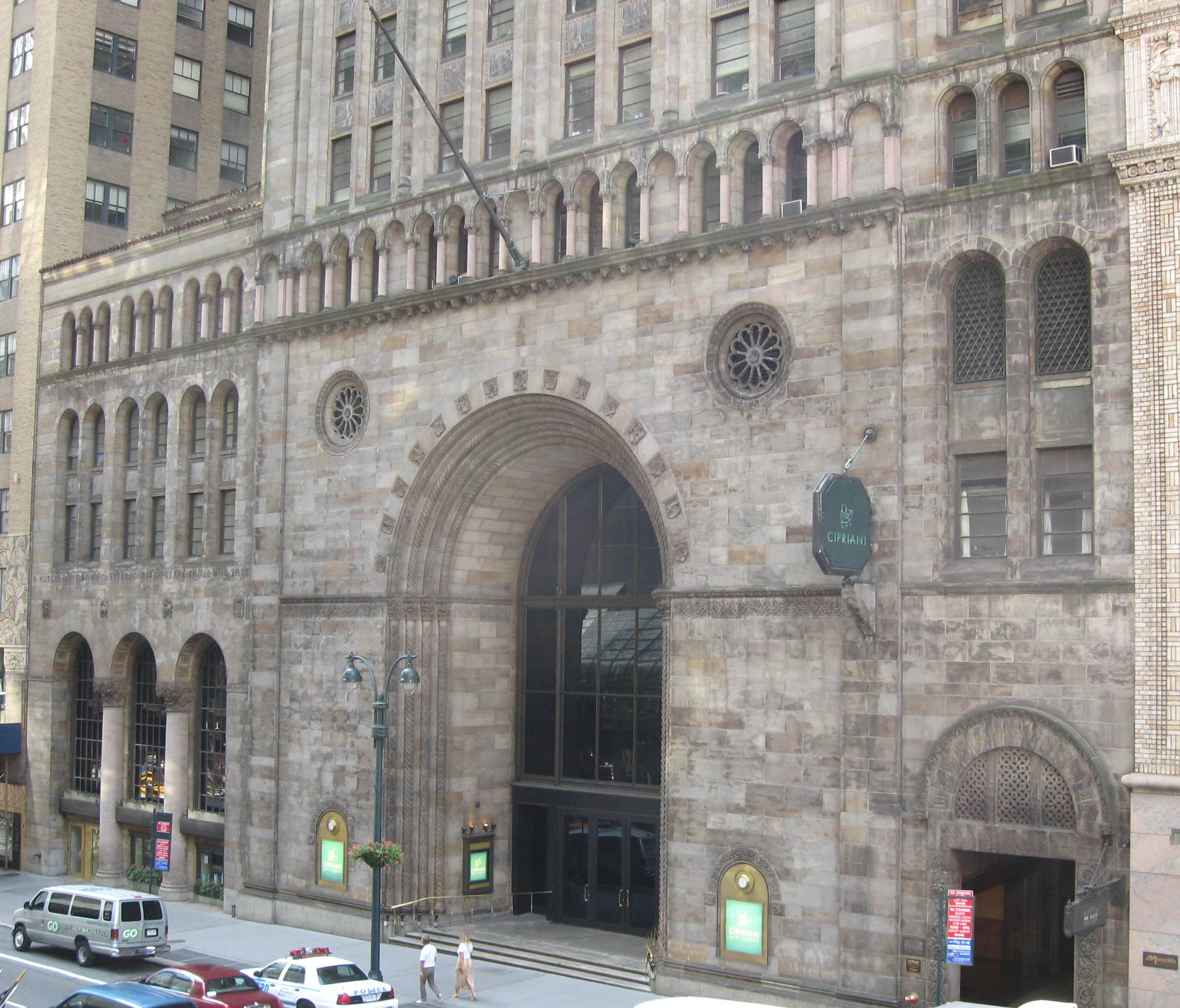
- Interactive map of the 110 East 42nd Street area
- Alternative names: Bowery Savings Bank Building

General information
- Type: Office
- Architectural style: Italian Romanesque Revival style
- Location: 110 East 42nd Street, Manhattan, New York, U.S.
- Coordinates: 40°45′05″N 73°58′37″W
- Construction started: 1921
- Completed: 1923
- Owner: SL Green

Height
- Architectural: 237 ft (72 m)
- Roof: 237 ft (72 m)

Technical details
- Floor count: 18

Design and construction
- Architecture firm: York and Sawyer
- Developer: Bowery Savings Bank

New York City Landmark
- Designated: September 17, 1996
- Reference no.: 1912
- Designated entity: Facade

New York City Landmark
- Designated: September 17, 1996
- Reference no.: 1913
- Designated entity: Banking hall interior

References
- "Emporis building ID 114244". Emporis. Archived from the original on October 28, 2019.

110 East 42nd Street, also known as the Bowery Savings Bank Building, is an 18-story office building in the Midtown Manhattan neighborhood of New York City. The structure was designed in the Italian Romanesque Revival style by York and Sawyer, with William Louis Ayres as the partner in charge. It is on the south side of 42nd Street, across from Grand Central Terminal to the north and between the Pershing Square Building to the west and the Chanin Building to the east. 110 East 42nd Street is named for the Bowery Savings Bank, which had erected the building as a new branch structure to supplement its original building at 130 Bowery. The building was erected within "Terminal City", a collection of buildings above the underground tracks surrounding Grand Central, and makes use of real-estate air rights above the tracks. The building is directly above the New York City Subway's Grand Central–42nd Street station.

As it was not a freestanding structure, 110 East 42nd Street deviated from traditional bank building designs, being laid out as an office building with a bank. The sandstone facade is divided into three vertical sections: the base, tower, and upper stories. Within the four-story base on 42nd Street, there is a small office entrance to the west, a large round-arched entrance at the center, and a smaller arcade to the east. The remainder of the facade is split by vertical piers into multiple bays. The ground floor contains an 80-by-197.5-foot (24.4 by 60.2 m) rectangular room behind the arch, stretching 65 feet (20 m) tall; this was originally the banking room. An annex known as the "Chapel" is to the east of the banking room, and an elevator vestibule and subway entrance are to the west. The other floors are used as offices.

110 East 42nd Street, as well as the adjacent Pershing Square Building, were built on the site of the Grand Union Hotel. Construction started in 1921 and was completed in 1923, and an addition was built between 1931 and 1933. Its facade and banking hall were made New York City designated landmarks in 1996. The building was sold to SL Green in 1998, and the former banking space was turned into an event venue and banquet hall operated by Cipriani S.A. The upper floors of 110 East 42nd Street continue to be used as an office building. Gotham Realty owned the office floors from 2007 to 2011, and Meadow Partners took ownership of the office stories in December 2021.

== Site ==
110 East 42nd Street is in the Midtown Manhattan neighborhood of New York City. It is bounded by 42nd Street to the north and 41st Street to the south, in the middle of the city block between Park Avenue to the west and Lexington Avenue to the east. The L-shaped land lot occupies 25,613 square feet (2,379.5 m^{2}), with a frontage of 154.5 feet (47.1 m) on 42nd Street and a depth of 197.5 feet (60.2 m). On the same block, the Pershing Square Building is to the west and the Chanin Building is to the east. Other nearby buildings include the Grand Hyatt New York hotel to the north, the Chrysler Building to the northeast, the Socony–Mobil Building to the east, and 101 Park Avenue to the south.

The completion of the underground Grand Central Terminal in 1913 resulted in the rapid development of Terminal City, the area around Grand Central, as well as a corresponding increase in real-estate prices. Among these were the New York Central Building at 47th Street and Park Avenue, as well as the Grand Central Palace across 42nd Street from the present 110 East 42nd Street. By 1920, the area had become what The New York Times called "a great civic centre".

== Architecture ==
The building was designed in the Italian Romanesque Revival style by the firm of York & Sawyer. The design shares many elements with the Pershing Square Building directly to the west, which was also co-designed by York & Sawyer. The George A. Fuller Company was the general contractor, and numerous other contractors and material suppliers were involved in the building's construction. (Note: The contractors included: C. H. Meyn, Inc. plasterwork; G. D. Jackson & Co. Inc., foreign marble; Walter H. Taverner Corporation, electrical contractor; Edward F. Caldwell & Co. Inc., lighting fixture suppliers; DePaoli Company Inc., mosaic and terrazzo; Wm. Bradley & Son., interior marble and stone work; William A. Daunt Co., leaded glass ceiling; Heinigke & Smith, glass mosaic ceiling in the office corridor; Masten Construction Co., concrete arches; Frederick S. Holmes, bank vault engineer; York Safe and Lock Co., vaults and safe-deposit boxes; Walter J. Buzzini Inc., kitchen equipment; Alexander Bryant Co., plumbing; Ronald Taylor Co., cement floors; J. J. Spurr & Sons., cut stonework; Joseph Elias & Co., Inc., glasswork; Campbell Metal Window Corporation, windows; Briar Hill Stone Co., exterior stonework; Ricci & Zari, stone, bronze, and plasterwork models) Architecture and Building characterized the building as having been inspired by Byzantine architecture, while architect and writer Robert A. M. Stern described the edifice as containing elements of both the Byzantine and the Romanesque.

=== Form ===
York and Sawyer's original plans for 110 East 42nd Street called for a four-story-tall banking room, topped by thirteen office floors, to extend the width of the block between 41st and 42nd Streets. A hip-roofed penthouse on top of the office floors would bring the building's height to 18 floors. The building has a frontage of 104 feet (32 m) on 42nd Street and extends 198 feet (60 m) to the back of the lot at 41st Street.

As it was not a freestanding structure, 110 East 42nd Street deviated from traditional bank building designs, including that of the original main branch at Bowery and Grand Street. Most significantly, it did not resemble a "modified Greek temple" as earlier bank buildings had. The building was instead designed in the Italian Romanesque Revival style, The Italian Romanesque design provided consistency to the facade, since the Pershing Square Building to the west was designed in a similar manner. York & Sawyer's ultimate design emphasized the juxtaposition of office and banking concerns in the building, which are stacked one above the other. The placement of offices above the banking hall reflected the limitations of the small site.

=== Facade ===
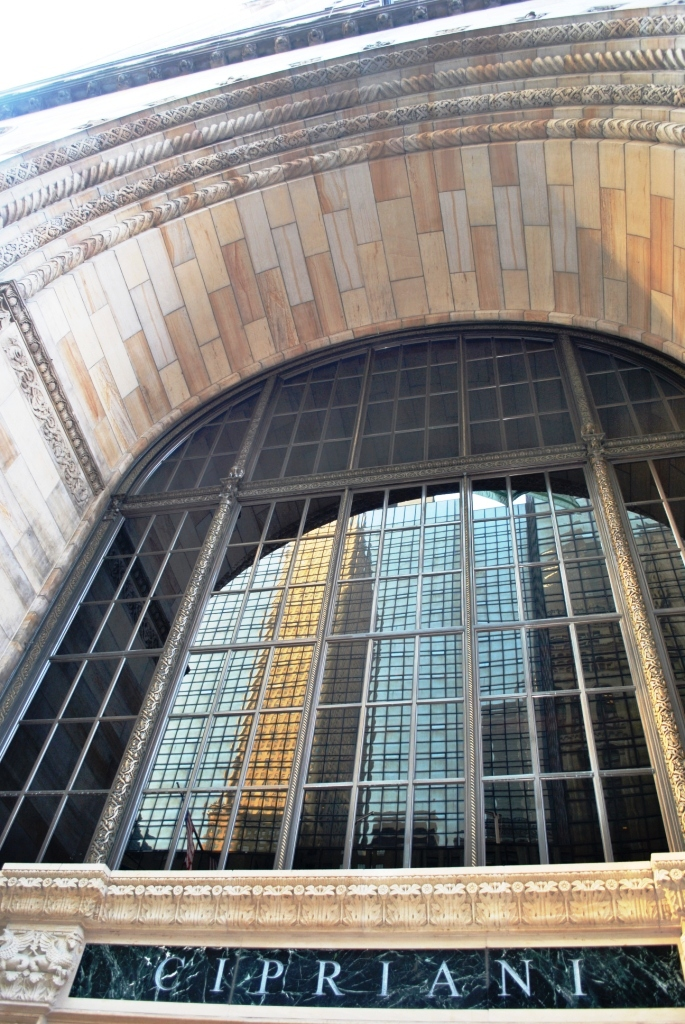
The 42nd Street archway, showing the large window above the doorway. The architrave runs below the top of the arch.

The facade is divided into three vertical sections: the base, tower, and upper stories. The facade contains elements such as arcades, and cornices with corbelling. A variety of materials and colors are used for the building's individual elements. The facade elements are also decorated with representations of figures such as "birds, beasts, fantastic mythological creatures [and] human forms".

The 42nd Street facade is largely made of Ohio sandstone. On the 42nd Street side, there are also columns and colonettes made of pink granite; tiled wall copings; and spandrels made of green marble. The spandrels separate metal-framed windows on each story. The 41st Street facade is made of sandstone on the first floor, and buff-colored bonded brick above it. At the bottom of both facades is a water table made of granite, which is 3 feet (0.91 m) higher on the eastern part of the building, due to the area's topography sloping downward to the east. Allegorical decorations, attributed to the firm of Ricci and Zari, are also placed on the facade.

==== Base ====
On the four-story base facing 42nd Street to the north, there is a large round-arched entrance taking up most of the facade, with detailed archivolts running on the underside of the archway. The arch measures 27 feet (8.2 m) wide and 47 feet (14 m) high. The large ground-floor arch leads to the giant banking room inside. A short flight of stairs leads to a set of doors, above which is a large window that fills the rest of the arch opening. There are voussoirs running along the top of the arch, with a carved motif located within every other voussoir. A pair of rose windows, small circular apertures, are located at the fourth floor flanking the top of the arch. An arcade with arched openings runs along the fifth floor facade. Also above this large arch are carvings of numerous animals that represent facets of the savings industry. These include a squirrel, a rooster, a dog, a lion, an owl, an eagle, a human with keys, and a farmer.

To the west of the main archway (on the right side as seen from 42nd Street), a small arch provides access to the office tower's entrance vestibule, the elevator lobby, and the Grand Central–42nd Street subway station. The entrance contains a semicircular tympanum above the doorway, with a geometric pattern, as well as embossed surrounds on either side of the doorway. The words "The Bowery Savings Bank Building" are inscribed on top of the tympanum, and the building's address is fully spelled out on the bottom of the tympanum. Above this archway are two pairs of windows, one each at the third and fourth floors. The third floor includes two rectangular windows and the fourth floor contains two arched grilles in place of window openings.

To the east (left) is the six-story "Chapel" annex completed in 1933. The lower two floors contain a three-arched arcade with two granite columns. The rectangular third-floor windows and arched fourth-floor windows are similar to those on the west side of the facade. Above the first- and second-floor arcade, there are four carved motifs, located at even intervals, as well as an inscription "A Mutual Institution Chartered 1834 To Serve Those Who Save". There is an arcade running across the 5th story facade.

The facade of the base on 41st Street, to the south, is similar in that it also contains a large archivolted arch with a set of doors below a large window. However, the doors on the 41st Street facade are located in a three-faced structure that projects slightly. The entrance arch on 41st Street is the same size as that on 42nd Street. Flanking the arch are three bays, two to the west (left) and one to the east (right) of the arch. These bays each contain two rectangular windows on the second floor, two arched windows on the third floor, and a rose window on the fourth floor. A driveway leading to an underground parking garage is located on the first floor underneath the leftmost bay.

==== Tower ====
The upper floors are largely finished in limestone with marble spandrels and metal-framed windows. On the 42nd Street side above the four-story base, the 5th through 13th floors are articulated with vertical piers and window spandrels. The piers divide the facade into five bays: four above the main banking entrance in the center, and one bay above the office-building entrance on the west (right) side. Each bay contains two windows on each floor. Horizontal cornices with corbeling are located above the 14th and 17th floors. There is an arcade running across the 5th story facade, as well as another arcade running across the 15th and 16th stories. The 17th story contains round-arched window openings while the 18th story consists of four windows that each contain three panes. On the 17th floor, at the top of 110 East 42nd Street's tower section, are tiled copings. At the 42nd Street facade, a flagpole extends from the center of the tower section at the fifth floor, directly above the center of the archway.

On the 41st Street side, the facade rises nine stories from ground level, with a cornice at the top of this section. Above the ninth floor, the building contains a 22-foot (6.7 m) setback, and the tower rises behind this setback to the 17th story. The 41st Street side is also articulated with vertical piers and window spandrels. It also contains five bays, with each bay containing two windows per floor.

=== Ground floor ===
The first floor consists of three sections: an elevator vestibule on the west, a banking room on the center, and the smaller "Chapel" section to the east. (Note: For a diagram of the floor layout, see Landmarks Preservation Commission Interior 1996, p. 39.) The annex and banking rooms use a mixture of materials on the walls and columns. According to the Landmarks Preservation Commission, these include ashlar as well as "marble, limestone, sandstone, imitation stone, and plaster". Valuables were stored in a bank vault in the basement, measuring 9 feet 8 inches (2.95 m) wide and 36 feet (11 m) deep. The York Safe and Lock Company built a rectangular steel vault door measuring 36 inches (910 mm) thick.

==== Banking room ====
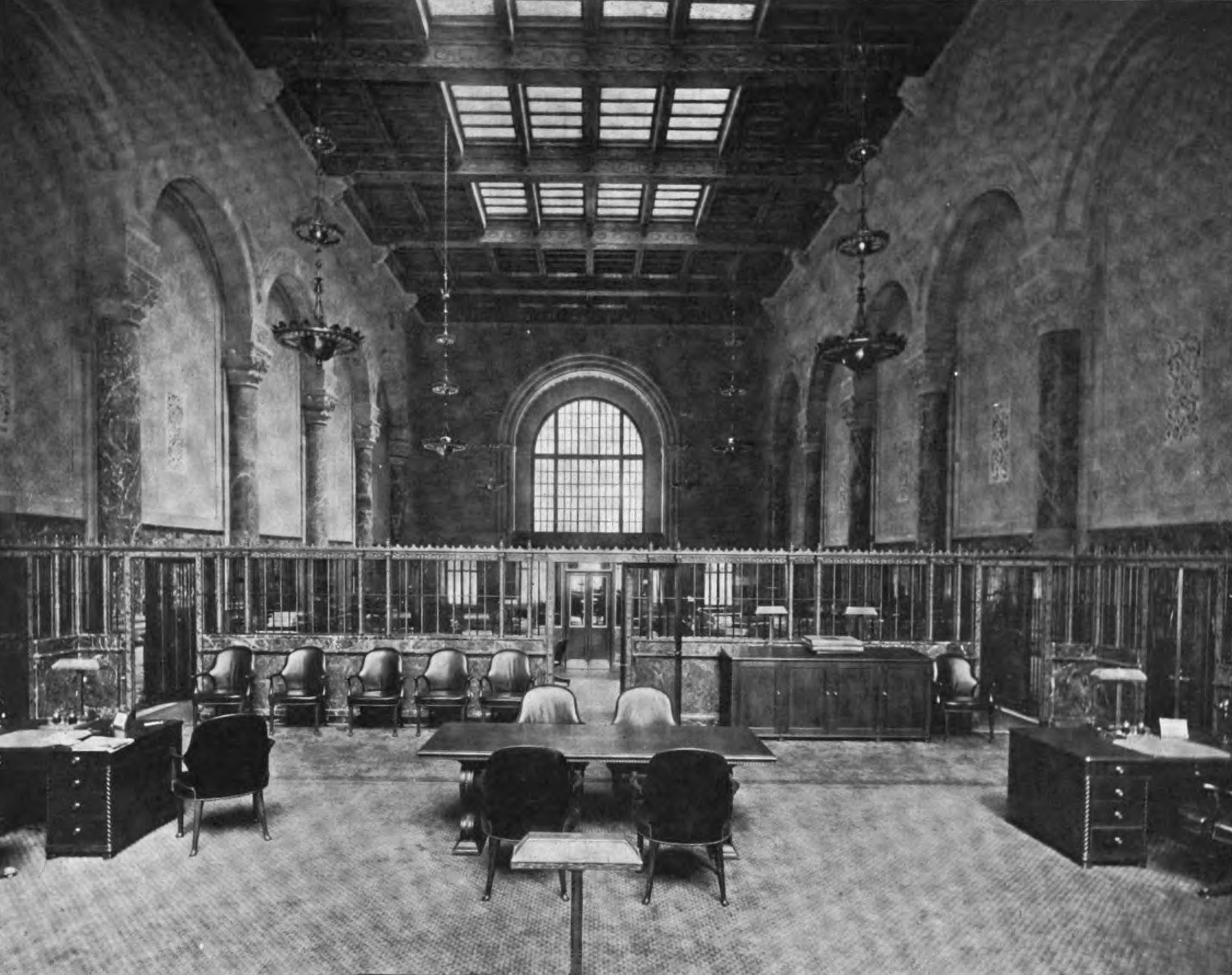
Banking room interior, seen in a 1923 magazine article

The New York Times described the space as one of the largest banking rooms in a New York City bank. Different sources cite conflicting dimensions for the room. According to the New York City Landmarks Preservation Commission, the first-floor banking room measures 80 feet (24 m) wide and 197.5 feet (60.2 m) long with a 65-foot-tall (20 m) ceiling. Architectural writer Robert A. M. Stern and Architecture and Building magazine give a figure of 75 by 200 feet (23 by 61 m), with a ceiling of 70 feet (21 m).

The banking room uses marble, limestone, sandstone and bronze screens to create a space reminiscent of a basilica. The banking room can be entered from the 41st Street arch to the south; the 42nd Street arch to the north; the office building's vestibule to the northeast; and two doorways leading to the passenger- and freight-elevator lobbies to the west. The floor slopes upward toward the south end of the room, since the 41st Street entrance is slightly higher than the entrance on 42nd Street. Another ramp slopes upward toward the "Chapel" annex to the east. The 42nd Street branch had a single waiting and banking room, obviating the need for clerks to frequently walk between back-room desks and public-facing counters.

The floor is made of polychrome marble, bordered by a cream-colored band of Traneville marble. The floor is arranged in multicolored patterns, laid in asymmetrical panels to resemble throw rugs. The patterns alternate between lozenges with stars, lozenges with squares, and hexagons. A wooden staircase at the northeastern corner of the banking room leads to the basement; it contains Levanto marble walls and parapet, as well as wooden handrails. The marble tellers' counter, 50 inches (130 cm) high, was in the middle of the banking room. The high wainscot and counter base were made of Rosso Levanto marble. A bronze teller's screen ran above the surface of the teller's counter. There were openings in the counter on its north and south sides. The screen was capped by what Architectural Forum described as "21 squat immortal penny-savers in pierced levanto". Behind the screen, and on the desks, were reflectors that illuminated the work space.

The east and west walls each have five arches supported by six polished-marble columns, each of a different color. Proceeding from north to south, the columns are made of Rouge Jaspe, Alps Green, Campan Melange, Rouge Royal, Tinos Green, and Levanto marbles. Each column measures 25 feet (7.6 m) high and has a diameter of 3 feet 2 inches (0.97 m). The columns' bases and capitals are made of Indiana limestone in high relief. The arches were nearly completely filled with mosaic designs, except for stone grilles that concealed the openings for the heating system. The remainder of the walls are made of stone in various types and textures. Indiana limestone and Briar Hill and Buff Mountain sandstone are used for the main wall surfaces. Marble, artificial stone, and plaster are also used. The socle is made of Alps Green marble, and the walls above are made of limestone and sandstone. Near the top of the wall, there was a deep-red frieze with white figures.

The ceiling above the banking room contains six deep beams, which are actually steel trusses. These beams are supported by imitation-stone corbels on the walls, which conceal steel brackets beneath. The ceiling is coated with six layers of materials, giving the impression that it contains coffers and small wooden beams. Six cast-bronze chandeliers are anchored from the ceiling, each of which has three tiers. The central lamp was modeled after that of the Hagia Sophia. Originally, the center of the ceiling had a skylight with twelve panels of pale amber glass. The skylight measures 35 by 60 feet (11 by 18 m).

==== Annex and office lobby ====
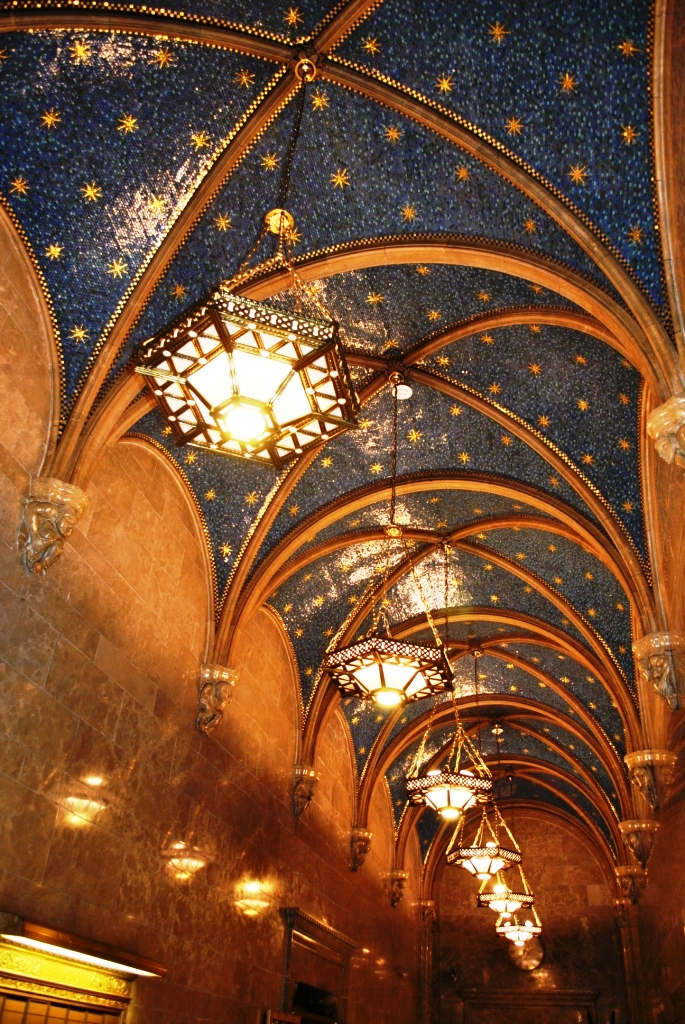
Interior ceiling vault

The "Chapel" annex is located to the east of the banking room's northern section, connected via two large rectangular openings cut through the party wall on the eastern side of the banking room. The design is similar to that of the banking room, with limestone and sandstone walls. A second floor loggia overlooks the northern end of the annex's first floor, and below that is a set of double doors leading to the central arch of the arcade along 42nd Street. There are two chandeliers and a painted rhombus pattern on the flat ceiling. A patterned frieze runs near the top of the wall.

The space to the west of the main banking room measures 20 feet (6.1 m) wide and 197.5 feet (60.2 m) long. It includes an entrance vestibule, as well as a lobby containing passenger and freight elevators. The vestibule, located to the north and facing 42nd Street, contains a ceiling with three ceiling vaults. It includes a staircase to the New York City Subway's Grand Central–42nd Street station, serving the 4, 5, 6, <6>, 7, <7>, and S trains, along its western side. To the south is the elevator lobby, which contains decorative floor tiling and six painted ceiling vaults. Six major trusses run perpendicular to the walls and are supported by twelve corbels, while smaller trusses run diagonally between alternating corbels. Six chandeliers hang from the ceiling at the locations where the diagonal trusses cross each other. The elevator doors contain bronze panels with various embossed motifs.

== History ==
In 1913, the Dual Contracts were signed by the Interborough Rapid Transit Company (IRT) and the Brooklyn–Manhattan Transit Corporation (BMT), two companies which operated parts of the present New York City Subway. A set of platforms at Grand Central, now serving the IRT Lexington Avenue Line (4, 5, 6, and <6> trains), was to be built diagonally under the building site as part of the agreement. At the time, the site under the proposed station was occupied by Grand Union Hotel, which was condemned via eminent domain in February 1914. The condemnation proceedings for the hotel cost $3.5 million (equal to $78.3 million in 2024 (Note: Johnston, Louis; Williamson, Samuel H. (2023). "What Was the U.S. GDP Then?". MeasuringWorth. United States Gross Domestic Product deflator figures follow the MeasuringWorth series.)). To pay the station's construction cost, the Public Service Commission approved the construction of a 25-story building above the station. By May 1915, the building site had been excavated for the construction of the building. Despite the passage of the 1916 Zoning Resolution, which required architectural setbacks to provide light to the streets below, the building plans conformed with the older zoning codes, which did not require setbacks.

Though the IRT Lexington Avenue Line's 42nd Street station opened in 1918, the site above the station was not developed as planned. The Transit Commission attempted to sell the building site in May 1920 for $2.8 million (equal to $33.1 million in 2024), but no one placed a bid. Then in July 1920, a realty consortium headed by investor Henry Mandel (Note: Mandel was later known for constructing other projects such as the London Terrace apartment complex in Chelsea, Manhattan) offered $2.9 million for the hotel (equal to $34.3 million in 2024), a proposal that was accepted. The value of the land at the future building site was extremely valuable; by 1923, the Rider's Guide to New York City referred to the blocks of East 42nd Street between Park and Fifth Avenues as "Little Wall Street".

=== Planning and construction ===
The Bowery Savings Bank, then located at 130 Bowery in lower Manhattan, was among the parties which were seeking to add an uptown location. In September 1920, its trustees unanimously agreed to look for an uptown site. The trustees soon found a site on 42nd Street. The bank's management were initially unenthusiastic about the 42nd Street site, because it was right next to the elevated Grand Central station. However, the bank's president pointed out that the original Bowery Savings Bank Building was itself next to an elevated line and that the 42nd Street location was very close to Grand Central Terminal and its attached subway station. Another issue was that a standalone bank building at 42nd Street was too expensive, so the building would also have to contain offices. The trustees bought the lot in November 1920 and established a committee the next month to draw up plans. The Bowery Savings Bank's decision reflected the northward movement of commerce in Manhattan, as well as the influence of suburbs on new development in New York City's core.

When the Bowery Savings Bank was planning its new uptown location, savings banks in New York were mostly limited to one location, a restriction that was not lifted until 1923. In November 1920, the bank circumvented this restriction by acquiring the Universal Savings Bank in lower Manhattan, which then relocated to 42nd Street. The Bowery Savings Bank was the first bank in the state to take advantage of a special provision in the state law, which allowed a savings bank to operate two branches if it merged with another savings bank. The Bowery Savings Bank took over the Universal Savings Bank in January 1921 and started operating a temporary branch next to Grand Central Terminal. That month, Mandel sold the Bowery Savings Bank the eastern half of the Grand Union Hotel site, which would be developed into an office building at 110 East 42nd Street. As per the purchase agreement between the bank and the corporation, the structures were to contain interlocking structures, including what was believed to be the city's tallest party wall separating two buildings.

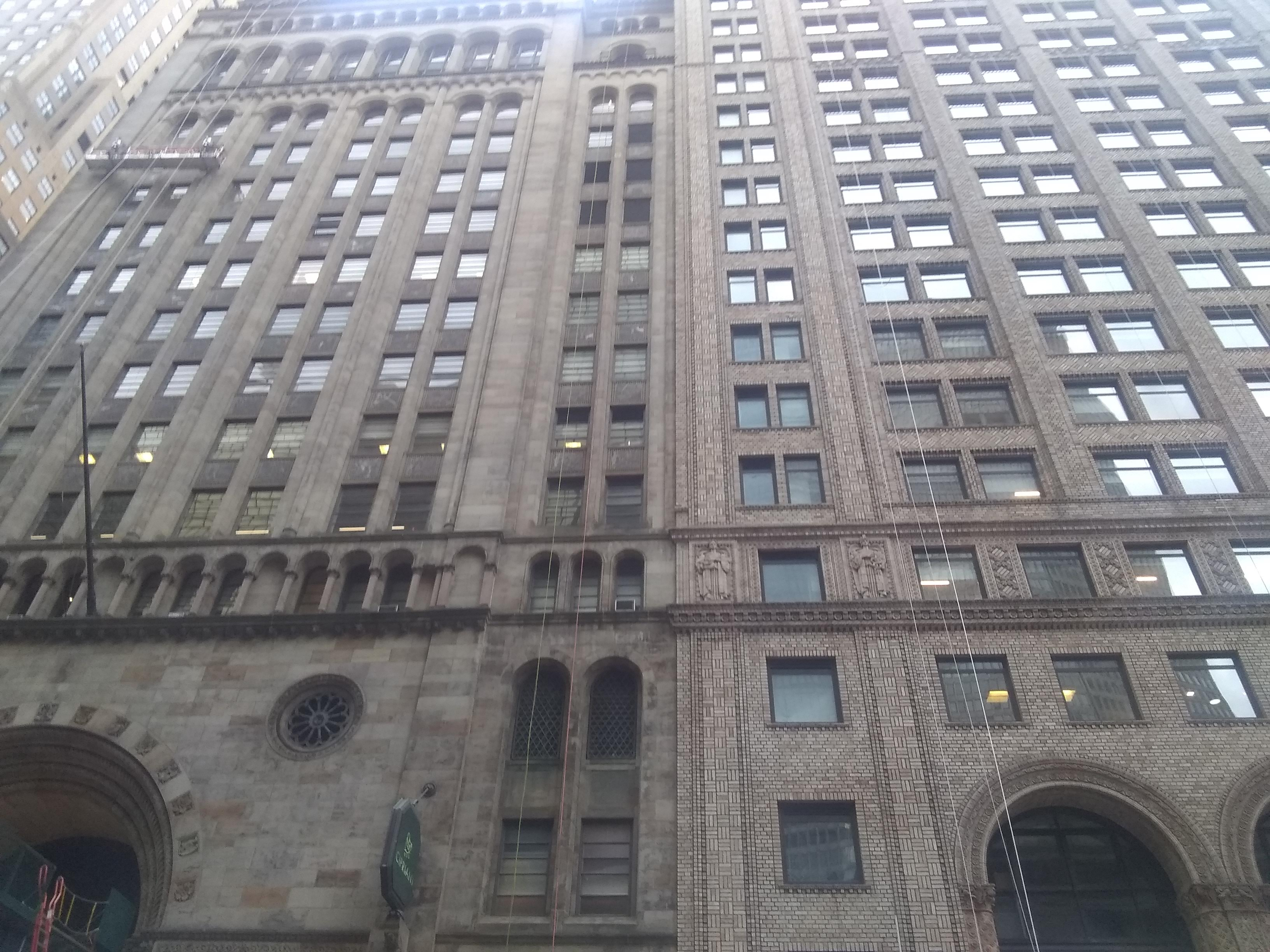
110 East 42nd Street (left) and the Pershing Square Building (right) share what was believed to be New York City's tallest party wall.

York and Sawyer, designers of several bank buildings in the eastern United States, had been hired to devise plans for the new Savings Bank at the site of the Grand Union Hotel. The lead architect on the project was William Louis Ayres. The plans were filed with the New York City Department of Buildings in April 1921. Excavations had started in February 1921 in advance of the plans' approval, and that June, the building committee recommended to start construction immediately. Construction on the building officially commenced that July with a groundbreaking ceremony. By the time the new branch opened in 1923, there were 155,000 people with accounts at the Bowery Savings Bank. The bank had seen $1.5 million in deposits (equivalent to $28,344,727 in 2025 (Note: 1634–1699: McCusker, J. J. (1997). How Much Is That in Real Money? A Historical Price Index for Use as a Deflator of Money Values in the Economy of the United States: Addenda et Corrigenda (PDF). American Antiquarian Society. 1700–1799: McCusker, J. J. (1992). How Much Is That in Real Money? A Historical Price Index for Use as a Deflator of Money Values in the Economy of the United States (PDF). American Antiquarian Society. 1800–present: Federal Reserve Bank of Minneapolis. "Consumer Price Index (estimate) 1800–".)) "on one day recently", compared to the $2,020 deposited on the original branch's opening day in 1834 (equivalent to $65,145 in 2025). The 42nd Street branch's managers referred to the location as the "42nd Street Office of the Bowery Savings Bank", refusing to call it a "branch".

=== Bank and office use ===
The bank's 42nd Street branch opened on June 25, 1923, with 5,600 accounts, more than half of which had been transferred from the Universal Savings branch. Just prior to the branch's opening, the bank moved $202 million of deposits (equal to $2.9 billion in 2024) the original branch to the new branch, using 14 armored cars guarded by 100 heavily armed policemen. The bank retained its original offices on Bowery. Upon the opening of 110 East 42nd Street, the branch had total deposits of $177 million (equal to $2.5 billion in 2024). There were 2,500 new accounts opened at the 42nd Street branch on the first day of operation. Customers registered 33,803 new accounts in the following nine months, and total deposits at the 42nd Street branch increased by $25 million in that time period (equal to $357.3 million in 2024). The presence of the new Bowery Savings Bank branch and of brokerage firms on 42nd Street bolstered its reputation as a "Little Wall Street".

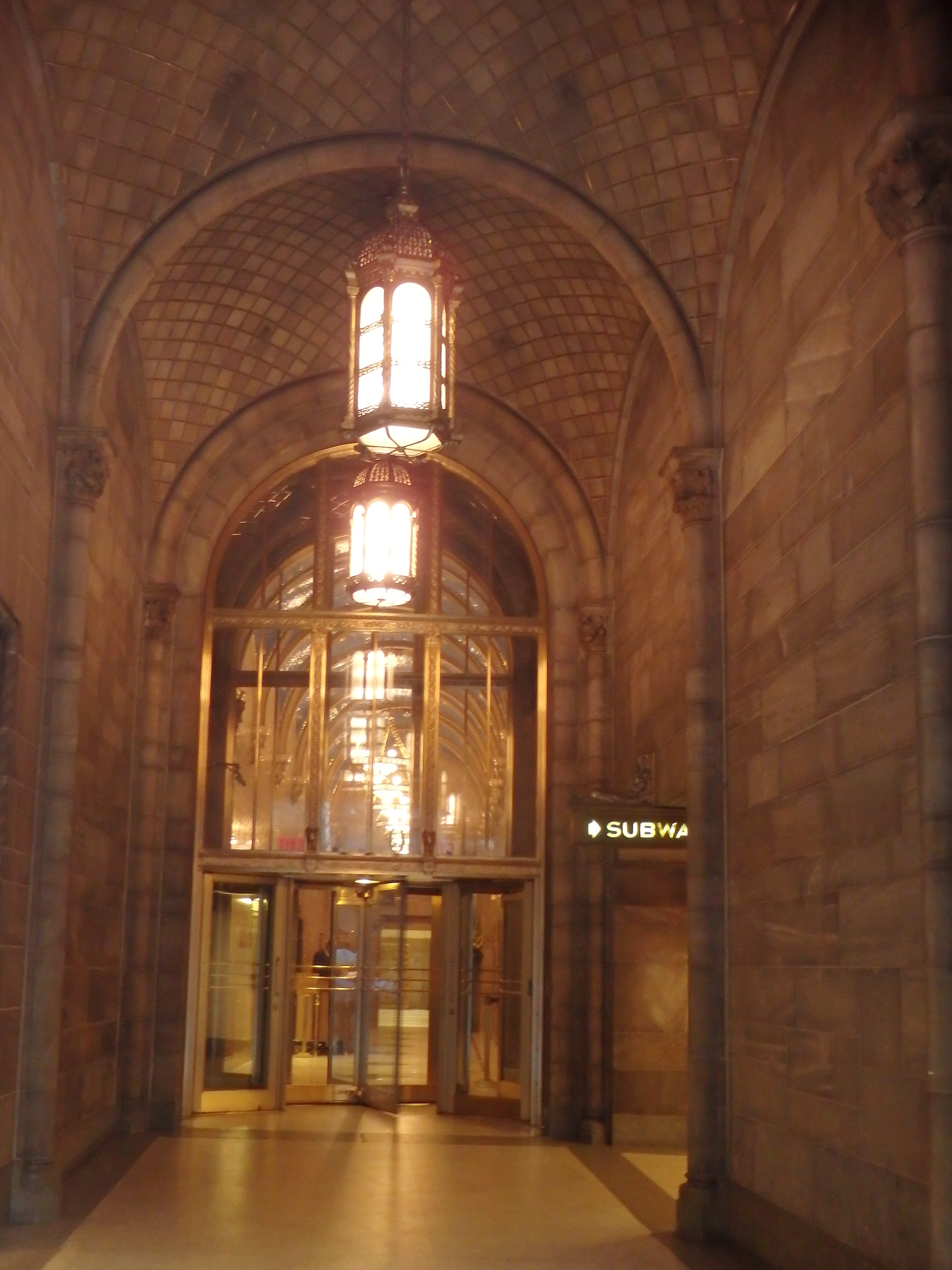
Office tower entrance, subway stairs to the right

Some alterations were made to the main building in 1927, including the installation of a clock, bronze display cases, and revolving doors outside the 42nd Street entrance. The bank established a safe-deposit department at its 42nd Street branch in March 1929, with 2,924 safe-deposit boxes in seven sizes. By the end of that year, the bank had installed 860 more safe-deposit boxes to address growing demand. A six-story addition to the east, which came to be called "The Chapel", was proposed in March 1931. York and Sawyer filed plans for the annex that August. The first floor of the annex would contain offices for administration, collection, information, a nd new accounts. The second story would include mortgage offices; the third story would be for the controller's department; and the fourth story would include service rooms. Louis Ayres designed the addition, while Marc Eidlitz & Son, Inc. erected the structure. The Chapel annex was completed by 1933.

The fifth floor facade's marble colonnettes were replaced with granite ones in 1951, and the annex's windows and entrance were redesigned in 1956. A plaque was erected outside 110 East 42nd Street in 1957, designating it as a point of interest and an unofficial "landmark". The screen above the 42nd Street archway were replaced with a glass window in 1962. The New York City Landmarks Preservation Commission (LPC) first considered designating the Bowery Savings Bank branch at 110 East 42nd Street as a landmark in 1966.

A year after the Bowery Savings Bank was acquired by H. F. Ahmanson & Co. in 1991, the building's ownership was jointly transferred to Ahmanson and a limited partnership, which owned the building as a condominium. The LPC hosted public hearings in 1993 to determine whether to designate the Bowery Savings Bank branch at 110 East 42nd Street, as well as the interior of the 130 Grand Street branch, as city landmarks. Greenpoint Bank took over the banking spaces in 1995, after having bought many of Ahmanson's branches. 110 East 42nd Street's facade and interior were designated as city landmarks in 1996.

=== Later ownership ===
SL Green bought the building in March 1998 and subsequently renovated the lobby as well as replaced the elevators. The ground-floor banking room was converted to a Cipriani restaurant and upscale event space, with Cipriani finalizing the deal for the new location in January 1999. At the same time, with the renovation and revival of Grand Central in the late 1990s, large tenants began occupying 110 East 42nd's office space. In 2007, Gotham Realty Holdings bought the building for $111.5 million, funding the purchase with a loan of $124 million from Carlton Advisory Services. By 2011, Gotham was unable to pay the remaining $90 million of its loan. In an attempt to avoid foreclosure, the loan servicer split the loan into a $65 million interest-payable note and a $25 million interest-free note. This failed and SL Green took back the property in 2011, paying $85.5 million. SL Green also bought the building's garage in 2013.

By 2014, the building was completely occupied by tenants such as The Princeton Review, Metro-North Railroad, and Morgan, Lewis & Bockius. At the time, the restrooms and corridors on the office floors had just been upgraded. The areas immediately surrounding Grand Central, including 110 East 42nd, had 1.8 million square feet (170,000 m^{2}) of air rights above the terminal and its rail yards. This allowed for the construction of developments with that maximum floor area above Grand Central. That year, some of 110 East 42nd's unused air rights were passed to One Vanderbilt, a 1,401-foot-tall (427 m) skyscraper being built a block to the west.

In May 2020, amid a loss of income during the COVID-19 pandemic in New York City, Cipriani defaulted on a mortgage loan that had been placed on its event venues at 110 East 42nd Street and 55 Wall Street. A special servicer took over the mortgage in 2021, but the two event venues were at risk of foreclosure by the end of that year. In December 2021, SL Green sold the building's 6th to 18th floors, as well as the building's garage, to Meadow Partners for $117 million. Meadow obtained $58.5 million from Apollo Global Management to finance the acquisition. By June 2022, King Street Capital Management was considering giving Cipriani $150 million to refinance the debt on 110 East 42nd Street and 55 Wall Street. That September, W. P. Carey gave Cipriani a $52.1 million commercial mortgage-backed securities loan and a $28 million mezzanine loan for the two properties.

== Critical reception ==
Shortly after the building was completed, Charles G. Loring of Architectural Forum wrote in 1928 that the edifice was "a castle in the clouds brought to earth, and the ticket of admission is only a stiff little deposit book." Though the Bowery Savings Bank had 200,000 depositors at the time of the building's opening, Loring wrote that each depositor could say of the banking hall: "This was built for me; herein am I privileged." On the other hand, historian and author George Harold Edgell wrote: "From the point of view of sound economics it is shocking. From the point of beauty it is a complete success."

The fifth edition of the AIA Guide to New York City referred to 110 East 42nd Street as "one of the great spaces of New York." A 1986 article in the Canadian newspaper The Globe and Mail said that 110 East 42nd Street "flaunts the power of New York money. Stupendously lavish, marbled and pillared and bronzed and tiled, it still has elegant Art Deco banking tables where you can write out cheques with an Art Deco ballpoint." Robert A. M. Stern wrote that the Bowery Savings Bank's midtown building "was without question the era's most opulent bank" and that it "rivaled" the original branch as the city's most ornate bank building. The building's design was not widely copied by other bank buildings in New York City, but its use of a variety of architectural elements was nonetheless emulated in other banks' designs.

== See also ==
- List of New York City Designated Landmarks in Manhattan from 14th to 59th Streets
