= Francisco Mujica (architect) =

Mexican architect

Francisco Mujica (January 29, 1899 – after 1929) was a Mexican architect. He developed a "neo-American" style of architecture.

== Biography ==
Mujica was born on January 29, 1899, in Mexico. His father, Mujica y Savago, was a diplomat. He was educated in Mexico, Chile, Spain, Belgium, and Paris, studying architecture, archaeology, urbanism, and sociology. Mujica was a professor at the National Autonomous University of Mexico and in Buenos Aires. He received a silver medal from the Paris Salon.

He investigated ruins in Mexico that dated to the pre-Columbian era and worked to create reconstructions showing what they likely looked like. Based upon these models, Mujica developed a "neo-American" style of architecture which received various awards from the Pan-American Congress of Architects. In 1919 Mujica proposed a skyscraper that would be thirty-four stories and based upon the Pyramid of Huatusco. In 1929 Mujica included his ideas in his introduction to History of the Skyscraper, which he self-published. The book was re-published in 1977 by Da Capo Press.

He also designed a "city of the future" with eighty story buildings and proposed it to the New York City Planning Commission. A commenter for The Brooklyn Daily Eagle described his proposals as "A little more practical than mere oil paint fantasies" and concluded that it was an "interesting idea, but apalling [sic]."

His work has been cited as an influence on the Art Deco movement.

== Bibliography ==
- Carranza, Luis E.; Lara, Fernando Luiz (2015-01-05). Modern Architecture in Latin America: Art, Technology, and Utopia. University of Texas Press. ISBN 978-0-292-76818-5.
- Tauranac, John (1997-04-15). Empire State Building: The Making of a Landmark. Macmillan. ISBN 978-0-312-14824-9.
