= Zamansky =

Zamansky is a surname. Notable people with the surname include:

- Jake Zamansky (lawyer), securities arbitration attorney based in New York, NY
- Jake Zamansky (skier) (born 1981), American alpine ski racer
- Marc Zamansky (1916–1996), French mathematician
- Vladimir Zamansky (born 1926), Russian actor

== See also ==
- Samanski
- Zemanski
