= 383 Madison Avenue =

Office skyscraper in Manhattan, New York

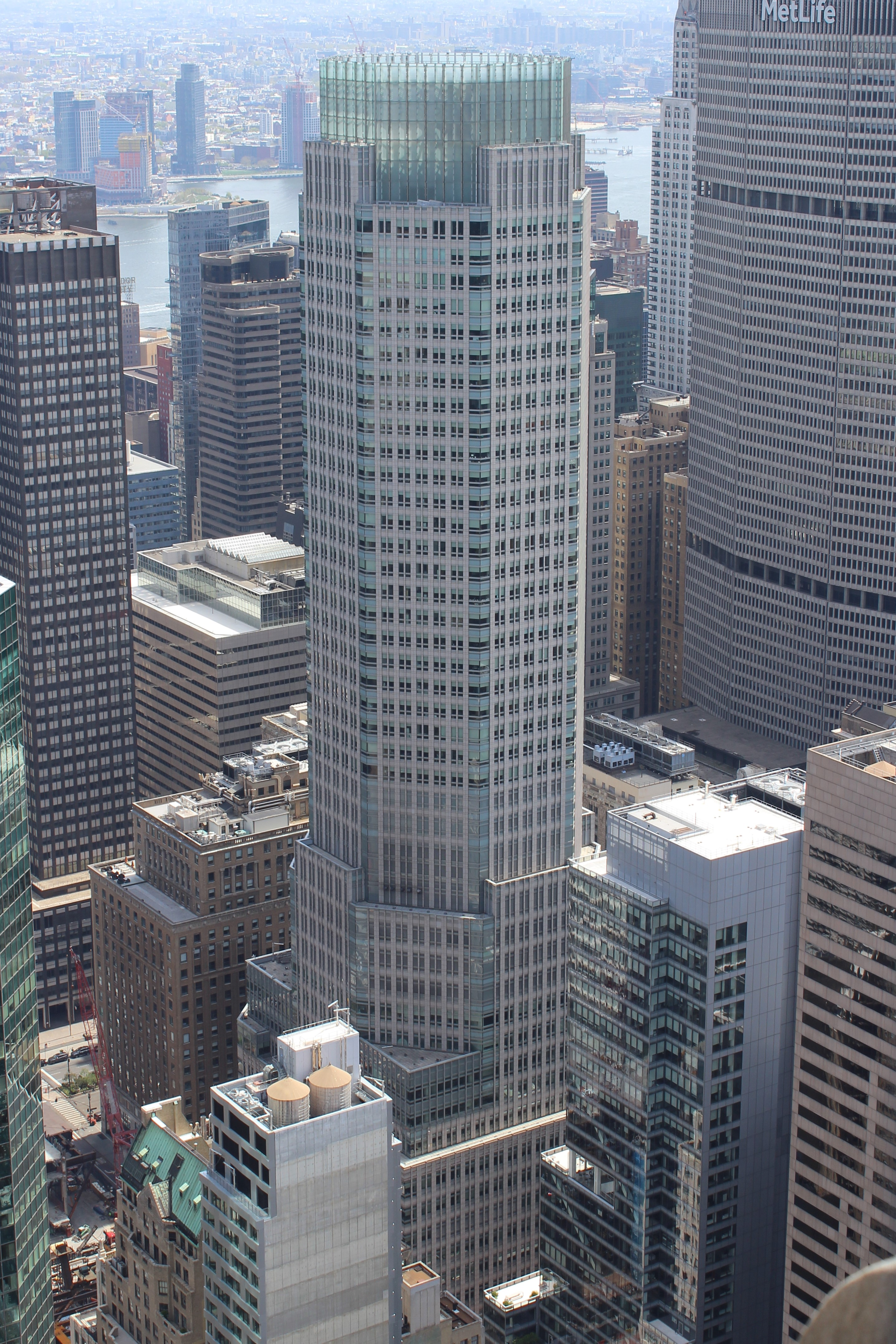
- 383 Madison Avenue in April 2021
- Alternative names: Bear Stearns Building

General information
- Status: Completed
- Type: Commercial/Office
- Location: Manhattan, New York, US
- Coordinates: 40°45′20″N 73°58′37″W
- Construction started: 1999
- Completed: 2001
- Opening: 2002
- Renovated: 2025-2027
- Owner: JPMorgan Chase

Height
- Roof: 755 ft (230 m)

Technical details
- Floor count: 47
- Floor area: 1,200,000 sq ft (110,000 m^{2})

Design and construction
- Architect: David Childs (Skidmore, Owings & Merrill)
- Structural engineer: LeMessurier Consultants; WSP Cantor Seinuk
- Main contractor: Turner Construction Company

383 Madison Avenue, formerly known as the Bear Stearns Building, is a 755 ft (230 m), 47-story skyscraper in the Midtown Manhattan neighborhood of New York City, New York, U.S. Built in 2002 for financial services firm Bear Stearns, it was designed by architect David Childs of Skidmore, Owings & Merrill (SOM). It housed Bear Stearns's world headquarters until 2008, when Bear collapsed and was sold to JPMorgan Chase. Since then, JPMorgan's investment banking division has occupied the building.

383 Madison Avenue occupies an entire city block bounded by Madison Avenue, 47th Street, Vanderbilt Avenue and 46th Street. The eastern two-thirds of the building is erected over two stories of tracks leading to the nearby Grand Central Terminal. Above the rectangular base, there are several setbacks tapering to an octagonal tower. The facade is made of granite with glass panels, and the tower is topped by a 70 ft (21 m) glass crown. To accommodate the railroad tracks under the site, the foundation and superstructure contain large sloped girders and trusses, and the elevators are placed on the west side of the building. The ground story also contains public spaces and an entrance to Grand Central Terminal. Above are seven trading floors, as well as office stories. The building has a usable floor area of 935,300 ft^{2} (86,890 m^{2}); including mechanical spaces, its total floor area is 1.2×10^{6} ft^{2} (110,000 m^{2}).

G. Ware Travelstead, First Boston, and the al-Babtain family acquired the site in 1982 and tried to develop a building with more than 70 stories. That plan stalled after Travelstead could not acquire the required air rights from Grand Central Terminal. HRO International then proposed redeveloping the site, but al-Babtain acquired full ownership in 1995 before HRO could obtain the lot. Bear Stearns agreed to develop the site in 1997 after several potential tenants declined to lease space there. Work started in 1999 and was completed in early 2002. When demolition of JPMorgan Chase's world headquarters at 270 Park Avenue commenced in 2019, the bank's headquarters was temporarily relocated to 383 Madison Avenue, pending the completion of the JPMorgan Chase Tower on the Park Avenue site.

== Site ==
383 Madison Avenue is in the Midtown Manhattan neighborhood of New York City. It occupies an entire city block bounded by Madison Avenue to the west, 47th Street to the north, Vanderbilt Avenue to the east, and 46th Street to the south. The land lot covers about 43,313 ft^{2} (4,023.9 m^{2}) with a frontage of 200.83 ft (61.21 m) on either avenue and 215.67 ft (65.74 m) on either street. Nearby buildings include the old New York Mercantile Library and 400 Madison Avenue to the northwest; 270 Park Avenue to the north; 277 Park Avenue to the northeast; 245 Park Avenue to the east; the Helmsley Building and MetLife Building to the southeast; and the Roosevelt Hotel to the south.

By the late 19th century, the Park Avenue railroad line ran in an open-cut in the middle of Park Avenue, one block east. The line was covered with the construction of Grand Central Terminal in the early 20th century, spurring development in the surrounding area, Terminal City. Among the developments were office buildings such as the Chanin Building, Bowery Savings Bank Building, and New York Central Building, as well as hotels like the Biltmore, Commodore, Waldorf Astoria, and Summit. By 1920, the area had become what The New York Times called "a great civic centre". Largely commercial International Style skyscrapers replaced many of the residential structures on Park Avenue during the 1950s and 1960s.

=== Previous buildings ===
The original building at 383 Madison Avenue was the Knapp Building, an office structure designed by Cross & Cross and built in 1923 for real estate firm Webb & Knapp. The limestone structure was 14 stories tall and contained 505,000 sq ft (46,900 m^{2}). The northern half of the building was erected first; it was quickly rented, prompting Webb and Knapp to build the southern half in the same style. The Knapp Building then served as the headquarters of the Manhattan Savings Bank. By the 1980s, the building also contained offices for advertising firm BBDO and CBS Educational and Professional Publishing.

The Knapp Building occupied the entire block, and its facade resembled a simplified classical palazzo. There were bronze-framed display windows at ground level, a string course above the third floor, paired windows in the intermediate floors, and single windows on the top stories. There were swags between the upper-story windows and a flat cornice atop the building.

The roof of the Knapp Building contained a modernist two-story penthouse designed by I. M. Pei and William Lescaze in 1952. The penthouse's reception area alone occupied about one-third of the 12,000 ft^{2} (1,100 m^{2}) lower level. This penthouse included a 25 ft-wide (7.6 m) circular office on the lower level, used by William Zeckendorf of Webb & Knapp. Zeckendorf's office was covered in oak panels, and there was a private terrace adjacent to it. The offices of the firm's secretaries were arranged around the penthouse as well. On the upper level was a circular dining room accessed by a circular elevator and a rounded staircase. The penthouse was topped by a small cylindrical tower, cantilevered from the core.

== Architecture ==
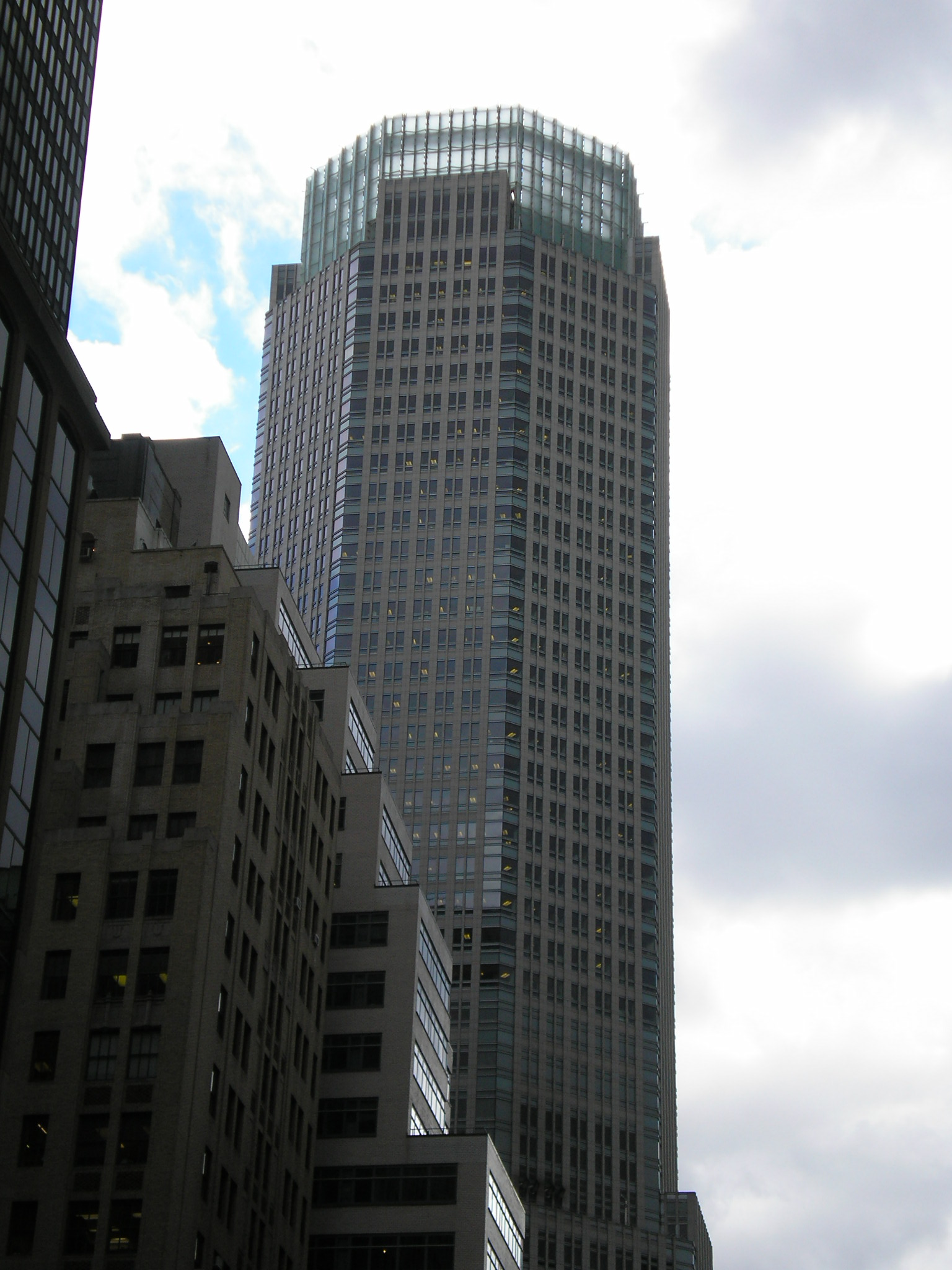
The glass "crown" at top

Designed by David Childs of Skidmore, Owings & Merrill (SOM) for defunct investment bank Bear Stearns, 383 Madison Avenue is 755 ft (230 m) tall with 47 floors. (Note: Stern, Fishman & Tilove 2006, p. 482, gives a slightly different figure of 756 ft (230 m) and 45 stories.) Turner Construction was the general contractor; Jaros, Baum & Bolles and Robert Derector Associates were the main engineers, and Cantor Seinuk was the structural engineer.

=== Form and facade ===
The building consists of an octagonal tower rising out of a rectangular base. The lowest nine stories occupy the entire site, measuring 212 by 200 ft (65 by 61 m). Above a setback on the ninth story, the cross section of the 10th and 11th stories is rectangular, measuring 185 by 196 ft (56 by 60 m). There is a further setback at the 12th story, where the building shrinks to an octagon measuring 172 by 185 ft (52 by 56 m). The octagonal tower sets back again at the 18th story (numbered as floor 14), where the building rises straight to its crown. This design maximized the size of the perimeter wall, and it created eight corners for private offices on each story.

The facade is made of granite with glass panels. The tower terminates at a 70 ft (21 m) glass crown, which is illuminated at night. The glass crown consists of 30-to-70 ft-tall (9.1-to-21.3 m) panels, which can also reflect sunlight during the daytime. Childs described the crown as being made of "crinkled glass", which is laminated and rolled.

=== Mechanical and structural features ===
==== Foundation ====
About two-thirds of the building's foundation sits above two levels of Metro-North Railroad tracks just north of Grand Central Terminal, rather than being attached to the bedrock itself. (Note: Smilow 2002, p. 71, and Stern, Fishman & Tilove 2006, p. 482, say that 60 percent of the foundation is above railroad tracks. Verini 2001 gives a figure of "fully two-thirds".) The columns of the building's substructure had to be arranged to avoid the tracks, which descended as much as 50 ft (15 m) beneath ground level. There is also a utility tunnel 15 ft (4.6 m) below the lower track level, which was built in the early 20th century, with unreinforced concrete walls measuring 3 to 10 in (76 to 254 mm) thick. The footing subgrade has a bearing capacity of 3,800 kPa (40 short ton/ft^{2}; 550 psi).

The general contractors reinforced many of the Knapp Building's existing columns and added new footings where necessary. Additionally, a new footing was placed atop the utility tunnel. During construction, the tracks under the site were temporarily closed. The contractors removed most of the track beds for storage, though one track remained in place. The contractors then installed new foundation walls. Each of the new concrete walls is 30 in (760 mm) thick and can carry loads of 55,160 kPa (576.0 short ton/ft^{2}; 8,000 psi). Steel grillages, measuring 4 to 17 ft (1.2 to 5.2 m) long by 18 ft (5.5 m) wide, are placed under the walls, distributing the loads to the bedrock.

==== Superstructure ====
The superstructure of the first 18 stories is placed on an orthogonal grid. The elevator pits could not descend below the first story, due to the presence of the tracks on the eastern portion of the site. Thus, the structural engineers placed the elevators, and the structural core of the lower stories on the western portion of the site. This created large floor areas but also decreased the effectiveness of the building's lateral bracing. North and south of the lower core are 18 in-thick (46 cm) concrete shear walls, which run to the building's western elevation. To compensate for the offset core, the building's eastern elevation contains a Vierendeel truss with columns spaced every 10 ft (3.0 m).

Above the double-height lobby are two trusses, each measuring 85 ft (26 m) long. These trusses support all of the upper floors while allowing the lobby to be designed as a column-free space. At ground level, the building contains storefronts, with columns at each corner. Above ground level, the corners of the building contain executive offices without any columns. This required the installation of slanted girders at each corner, as well as spandrel beams that connect opposing corners. The trading floors, which are immediately above the lobby and storefronts, contain fewer columns than usual, requiring that the upper stories be supported by complex trusses. On the trading floors, the easternmost 60 ft (18 m) and the westernmost 30 ft (9.1 m) of each story do not have columns.

HVAC and mechanical equipment are placed on several intermediate stories, since there is not enough room in the basement. The building was designed to run for four days without exterior power through four 7,500 kW (10,100 hp) emergency electrical generators, its own steam turbines, and tanks that can store 109,000 US gal (410,000 L; 91,000 imp gal) of emergency water. The mechanical spaces are on the 14th through 17th stories (labeled as floors 10 through 13). The core of the upper stories is at the center of the site. Therefore, diagonal girders are installed within the mechanical levels to shift loads up to 42 ft (13 m) westward, between the upper and lower cores. The sloped girders measure up to 24 by 20 in (610 by 510 mm) across and can carry up to 22.2×10^{6} N (5,000,000 lb_{f}). The girders intersect at nodes, which each consist of several layers of 4 in-thick (10 cm) steel plates. Each node connects up to four girders.

Above the 18th story, the columns at the perimeter of the octagonal tower are placed 30 ft (9.1 m) apart, creating a rigid moment frame. Each corner of the octagon has no columns. Additionally, the perimeter columns are not aligned with the steel frame below, which required the use of a double-height ring truss wall on the 18th and 19th stories to distribute loads to the lower stories. The 18th and 19th stories contain technological equipment for the tenants. In total, the superstructure has 18,000 short tons (16,000 long tons) of steel.

=== Interior ===
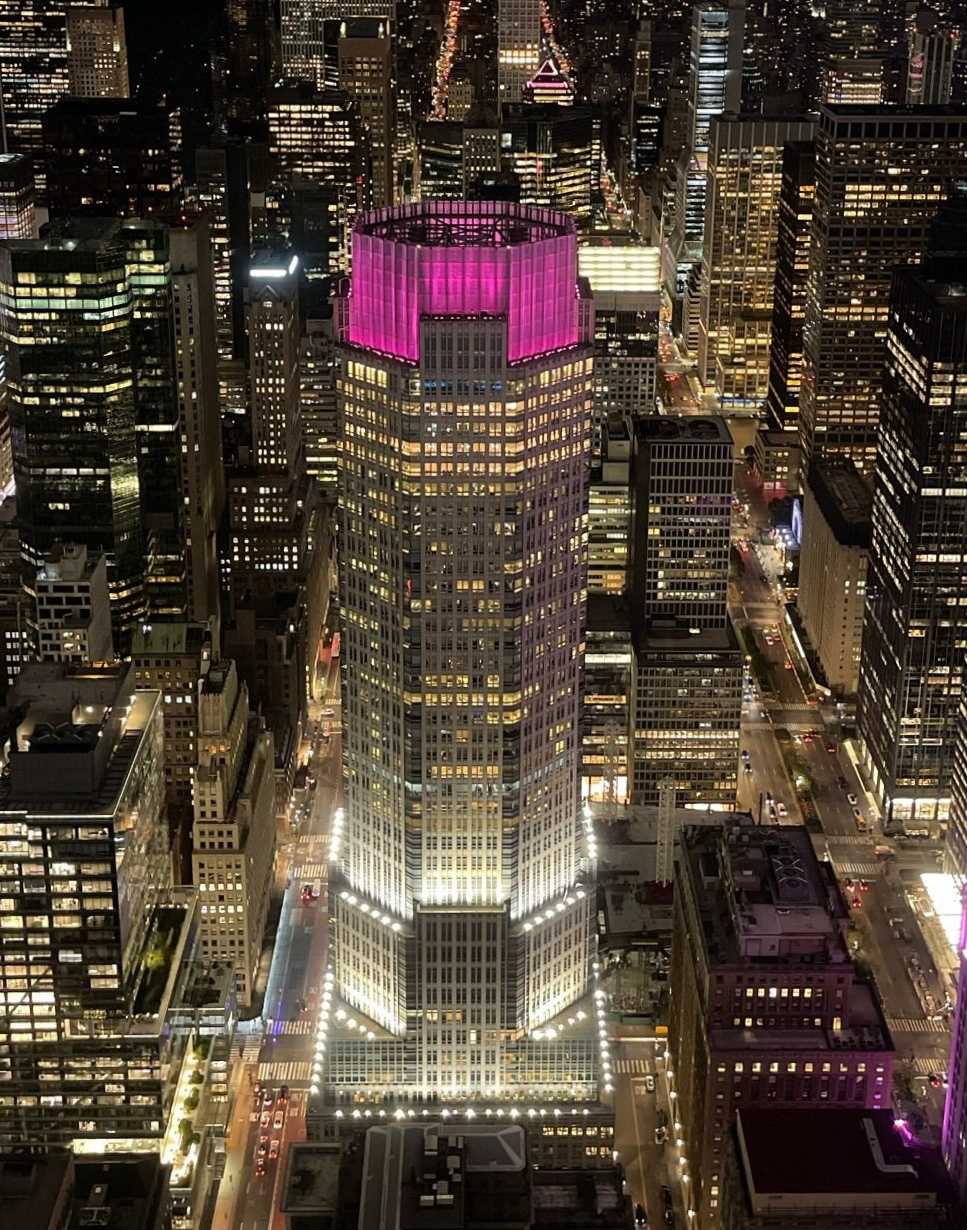
The building at night as seen from One Vanderbilt

The building has a total floor area of 1.2×10^{6} ft^{2} (110,000 m^{2}). The usable floor area covers only 935,300 ft^{2} (86,890 m^{2}), giving it a floor area ratio (FAR) of 21.6. At the time of the building's planning, this was the maximum FAR allowed in any building in New York City. This includes 650,000 ft^{2} (60,000 m^{2}) of space that the developers could build "as-of-right" without additional zoning provisions, as well as 285,866 ft^{2} (26,557.8 m^{2}) of air rights from above the terminal. About 26 percent of the building is mechanical space, which does not count toward FAR calculations. This was allowed since 383 Madison Avenue's zoning district does not specify any height limit. Under normal zoning regulations, the maximum FAR for any building on the tower's site was 15, but the developers received two bonuses of 20 percent each, bringing the FAR to 21.6. The developers had to include privately owned public space at the building's base for the first bonus, and they built a transit entrance for the second bonus.

==== Ground floor ====
There is a set of escalators and a staircase near the northwest corner of the building, which contains an entrance to Grand Central Terminal. Work on this entrance began in 1997 as part of the Grand Central North passageway system, which was completed in 1999. The Grand Central North entrance covers 707 ft (215 m). Above the Grand Central North entrance is a mosaic panel showing Manhattan's skyline before the World Trade Center was built. The panel is one of three that were commissioned by the Manhattan Savings Bank around 1950; they were initially installed above the entrance to the Knapp Building. Each panel measured about 10 ft (3.0 m) wide. Before the mosaic panel was reinstalled in the Bear Stearns Building, it was restored and cleaned, and new mosaic pieces were fabricated to replace broken pieces. A new white background measuring 14 by 11 ft (4.3 by 3.4 m) was created and installed behind the skyline.

There are also several recessed corner entrances totaling 1,300 sq ft (120 m^{2}); a mass-transit access point covering 5,031 sq ft (467.4 m^{2}); and a "through-block connection" covering 5,706 ft^{2} (530.1 m^{2}). The through-block passageway connects 46th and 47th Streets along the eastern side of the building, providing access to Grand Central North from 46th Street. To comply with zoning regulations, there are also shops along the Madison Avenue side of the building. The lobby has a 28 ft-tall (8.5 m) ceiling with 24 ft-tall (7.3 m) pillars and a black security desk. The lobby has hosted Christmas parties, executive meetings, and even a wedding between employees.

==== Offices ====
When it opened, the building contained 23 elevators; as of 2020, the building has 30 elevators. In addition, the building has a 450-seat auditorium, employee dining areas, a broadcast studio, and an employee fitness center. The auditorium and employee dining areas are within the lowest nine stories of the building. Floors 12 and 13 contain executive dining rooms. The offices also include multimedia rooms, electronic "data walls", and remote data centers. Each story also has three electrical closets and two telecom rooms. The interiors use 10,000 ft^{2} (930 m^{2}) of moldings, 37,000 ft^{2} (3,400 m^{2}) of terrazzo, 30,000 ft^{2} (2,800 m^{2}) of Maine granite, and ceilings made of medium-density fiberboard.

When the building was being developed, the lowest portion of the building was to contain seven rectangular trading floors, which could accommodate 2,000 traders. As built, floors 3 through 11 served as Bear Stearns' trading floors. The trading floors originally spanned only four stories, two each for equity and fixed income departments. Each floor is 44,000 sq ft (4,100 m^{2}) and can fit 285 traders. The trading floors each contain about 23,000 ft^{2} (2,100 m^{2}) of usable space. The placement of the concrete foundation walls between the railroad tracks mandated that the trading floors be divided into bays, each measuring 42.5 ft (13.0 m) wide by 30 ft (9.1 m) long.

== History ==
=== Travelstead plans ===
==== Early proposals ====
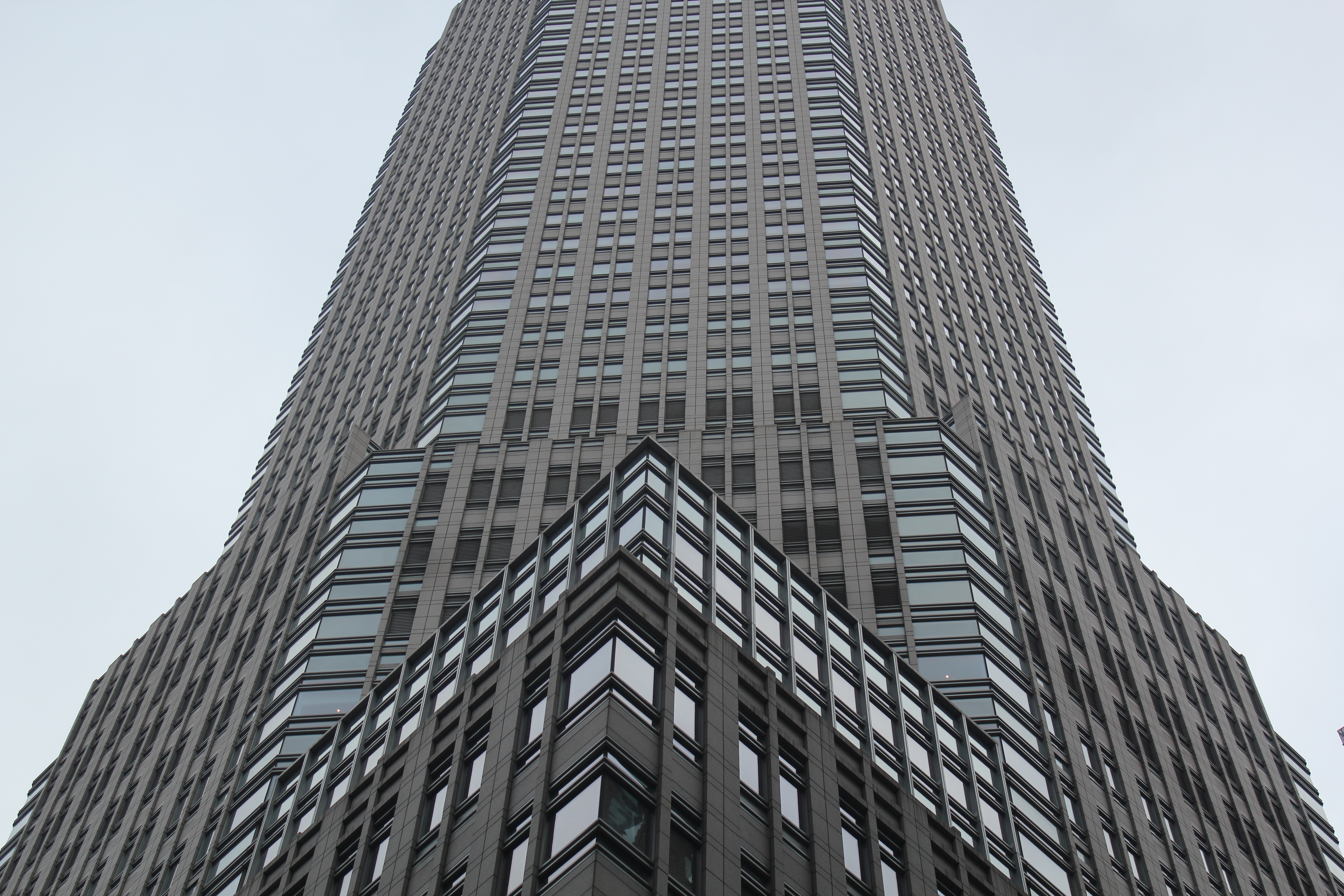
View of the building from ground level in 2022

By the 1980s, Grand Central Terminal had about 2×10^{6} ft^{2} (190,000 m^{2}) of unused air rights, which its owners (a subsidiary of the former Penn Central) sought to sell off. Since the terminal was a city landmark, its owners could not use the air rights to expand the terminal. In Penn Central Transportation Co. v. New York City (1978), the United States Supreme Court had ruled that the city government had the right to designate the terminal as a landmark, even if the designation prevented Penn Central from using its air rights. Afterward, Penn Central planned to sell the air rights to other developers; however, many potential development sites could not receive Grand Central's air rights because they were too far away. (Note: Typically, New York City zoning sets a maximum floor area for each land lot, after which developers must buy air rights to increase their floor area. Owners of buildings that contain less than their maximum floor area can sell air rights to developers who own adjacent sites. Without a zoning subdistrict, building owners can only transfer air rights between buildings if the sites are adjacent or across the street, and/or if the same owner owns a contiguous string of land lots between these sites.) Manhattan Savings Bank was also looking to sell the Knapp Building at 383 Madison Avenue in the early 1980s.

Developer G. Ware Travelstead, who led First Boston Real Estate, acquired the old building from Manhattan Savings Bank in October 1982 for $77.75 million. Travelstead and First Boston were joined by a Saudi partner, the al-Babtain family. The developers hired SOM to design a replacement for the site. Initial plans reached up to 2,200,000 sq ft (200,000 m^{2}) and 140 stories, taller than Sears Tower, the tallest building in the world at the time. At the time, all leases at the Knapp Building were set to lapse in three years. For this project, First Boston arranged to buy at least 1.5×10^{6} ft^{2} (140,000 m^{2}) of air rights from Grand Central. By 1984, Travelstead planned to build a shorter tower of 50 to 70 stories, saying: "It's not clear to me that anybody wants to pay an $8, $10 or $12 premium to be in a very tall building." Subsequently, Travelstead hired Kohn Pedersen Fox (KPF) to redesign the project. KPF created new plans for the building with assistance from structural engineer William LeMessurier.

Travelstead proposed a tower of about 70 stories and over 1,000 ft (300 m). (Note: Sources cite the proposal as being either 72, 73, or 74 stories. The height was cited as 1,029 ft (314 m), 1,030 ft (310 m), 1,040 ft (320 m), or 1,080 ft (330 m).) The building would have been one of the tallest in New York City; (Note: If the building had been 1,040 feet tall or less, it would have been the fifth-tallest behind the Twin Towers, Empire State Building, and Chrysler Building. If the building had been 1,080 feet tall, it would have exceeded the Chrysler Building to become the fourth-tallest.) it would have contained a floor area of 1,400,000 sq ft (130,000 m^{2}). The office floors were to be arranged in a cross, with columns in the building's core to avoid underground tracks at Grand Central Terminal. The below-ground structure would have been made of steel because a concrete foundation could not fit between the tracks. To redistribute loads from the exterior to the core, diagonal beams would be installed at intervals of eight floors. There would have been trading floors made of concrete (corresponding to the first ten stories above ground), as well as a series of office stories capped by a shoulder truss. The top 20 stories would have been above the truss. To blend in with nearby buildings, the lower stories would have contained a granite facade, while the upper stories would have been made of metal and glass. The Royal Institute of British Architects lauded the proposal as one of the ten best designs in the 20th century. Architecture writer Ada Louise Huxtable derided it as "a ski-slide tower of Brobdignagian scale and bulk in what might be called Mesopotamian-Motorola style".

==== Air rights dispute ====
By 1986, Travelstead planned to start work on its tower the next year. The site was only zoned for 650,000 sq ft (60,000 m^{2}) and Travelstead needed to purchase 800,000 ft^{2} (74,000 m^{2}) of air rights from Grand Central Terminal to attain his desired square footage. Without a zoning subdistrict across which air rights could be distributed, the terminal's air rights could typically only be transferred to adjacent sites with one exception. Penn Central could transfer air rights from Grand Central through adjacent buildings that it also owned, thus forming a "chain of ownership". Such a chain between Grand Central and 383 Madison Avenue no longer existed aboveground, since Penn Central had sold off the Biltmore and Roosevelt hotels, which would have connected the two sites. Travelstead and Penn Central claimed that there was a chain of ownership through the underground tracks, which Penn Central did own. City officials did not believe that underground property or railroad tracks were part of a chain of ownership, saying that, if such a chain was valid, air rights from Grand Central could be transferred up the Park Avenue line to the New York City border.

Travelstead submitted a special-permit application and a draft environmental impact statement to the city government in 1986, but the city did not take any action on the matter for two years. Even as Travelstead continued to advocate for the 70-story plan, a scaled-down proposal called Scheme III was unveiled in 1987 (despite the name, there had been no Scheme II). This proposal called for a 48-story tower with a similar massing to KPF's 70-story proposal, though the pinnacle would contain multiple spires, evocative of Manhattan's older skyscrapers. The Knapp Building was empty by the late 1980s. Though Travelstead left First Boston in 1988, he continued to be involved in the project. He sued the city in early 1988, and a State Supreme Court judge ruled that the city had to decide within 30 days on whether to allow the plans to proceed.

A six-month public review process for the planned building began in April 1989. Travelstead encountered opposition in trying to transfer the air rights. Manhattan Community Board 5 voted unanimously to deny the transfer in June 1989. Following the Community Board's opposition, the New York City Planning Commission (CPC) also disapproved of the transfer that August. Travelstead then sued the city in the State Supreme Court. By late 1990, the Metropolitan Transportation Authority (MTA) sought to buy Grand Central and build 383 Madison on First Boston's behalf, as MTA officials believed the agency could qualify for a zoning exemption. Under that plan, the MTA would have built a driveway in the tower's base, connecting to a new truck-loading dock within Grand Central.

Meanwhile, the CPC had suggested creating a zoning subdistrict in November 1989, wherein Grand Central's 1.7×10^{6} ft^{2} (160,000 m^{2}) of air rights could be transferred to any building in the district. In 1991, the CPC issued a report on the proposed Grand Central Subdistrict, which would allow Penn Central to transfer air rights to any building in a seven-block area. Among those sites was 383 Madison Avenue, where Travelstead had to finalize his purchase of the air rights within a year of his State Supreme Court lawsuit being decided. In return, Penn Central and MTA proposed expanding the proposed district significantly. When the district was created that year, it covered 22 blocks. After the Supreme Court upheld the city's decision to deny the air rights transfer in 1991, Travelstead appealed the decision. By then, office demand in New York City had decreased significantly, and 383 Madison Avenue was put on hold, along with several other large office projects citywide. First Boston removed Travelstead from the project in 1992, and the Knapp Building remained empty for over a decade.

=== Ronson/HRO and al-Babtain plans ===
HRO International, led by British developer Howard Ronson, acquired an option in 1994 to buy the property from First Boston. HRO planned a 24-story, $200 million building named Park Avenue Place, with 800,000 sq ft (74,000 m^{2}) of space. These included column-less spaces for trading floors and workstations; high ceilings; and an electrical supply that was twice that of older buildings. HRO planned to reuse the old building's foundations and also solicited tax breaks from the city government. The New York Times characterized the new plans as a symbol of the city's economic recovery. HRO intended for the building to be a speculative development. Ronson reportedly discussed with J.P. Morgan & Co. (a predecessor to JPMorgan Chase) and Swiss Re about anchoring the building. After half of the building was pre-leased, Ronson planned to apply for a $100 million construction loan. Ronson sought to charge rents of $50/ft^{2} ($540/m^{2}), but many prospective tenants balked at the high prices.

HRO agreed in July 1994 to buy the site for $57 million; at the time, the tower was to be completed in 1996. HRO had intended to start clearing the site in 1995, after taking control. After First Boston postponed the sale, HRO pushed back the planned completion date to 1997. HRO ultimately never finalized its purchase. In January 1996, First Boston signed a contract to sell the land to Bear Stearns, whose lease at 245 Park Avenue was expiring. Ronson disputed the sale, claiming that he had already spent $8 to $10 million on the site. The next month, the al-Babtain family announced it would be buying First Boston's stake, taking full control of the site for $55 million. Bear Stearns CEO James Cayne had bought an option for $10 million worth of air rights from the site, leading the al-Babtains' lawyers to accuse Cayne of tortious interference. Cayne then sold the option on the air rights to the al-Babtains for a nominal fee, and the family stopped communicating with him.

Afterward, Bear Stearns negotiated for space at another building instead. Ronson hoped to attract Morgan Guaranty to 383 Madison, but the company indicated in mid-1996 that it was no longer considering that site. Chase Bank, another predecessor of JPMorgan Chase, entered negotiations with the al-Babtain family in October 1996, hoping to develop a new tower next to its existing headquarters at 270 Park Avenue. Chase Bank ultimately canceled its plans in April 1997, supposedly after Chase CEO William B. Harrison Jr. failed to show up at a meeting with the al-Babtains. Despite this, observers expected that the planned building's proximity to Grand Central would attract a tenant before the end of the year.

=== Development and opening ===
By mid-1997, Bear Stearns was again negotiating for the site with the al-Babtain family. That August, the bank agreed to develop a new headquarters at 383 Madison Avenue. In exchange, the mayoral administration of Rudy Giuliani agreed to give Bear Stearns up to $75 million in sales tax exemptions, on the condition that Bear Stearns maintain 5,800 employees and create 13,300 new jobs in New York City over the next fifty years. The bank planned to move its headquarters and most of its 4,500 employees to the new building. The skyscraper was to have large trading floors to accommodate those functions. The developers acquired 285,800 ft^{2} (26,550 m^{2}) of air rights from Grand Central; they were the first developers to use air rights from the Grand Central subdistrict, which had just been created. The al-Babtain family agreed to hire Sterling Equities to develop the skyscraper for Bear Stearns, although Hines Interests ended up managing the development process.

The demolition of the old Knapp Building began in May 1998, with the old Manhattan Savings Bank mosaics being removed from that building's facade for preservation. Bear Stearns signed a 99-year lease for the land beneath the building in August 1998. Bear Stearns would control the building for the duration of the lease. Later the same year, a construction worker was killed when he was struck in the head by debris. By mid-1999, the building's structural steel was being constructed, and the building was planned to be complete in 2002. At the time, the city had a shortage of skilled construction workers. Due to the complexity of the site, Turner Construction hired 85 subcontractors (compared to 50 in comparable projects). Up to 1,500 workers were employed in the construction process at any time. Cayne also oversaw many of the smaller details of the project, hiring an inspector to check all invoices, then firing the inspector because he could not collaborate with the contractors.

In mid-2001, before the September 11 attacks, the bank reinstalled one of the Manhattan Savings Bank mosaics in its lobby. Despite the attacks, Bear Stearns began moving employees into the new building in October 2001. Near the building's completion, some of the wood in the crown developed mold after it was exposed to the rain. Though this problem was fixed, it led to a dispute between Cayne and his longtime associate Fred Wilpon; due to defects in the quality of the work, Wilpon refused to authorize a $20 million discretionary bonus for Cayne. The crown was first illuminated on April 4, 2002, at a ceremony attended by Cayne, U.S. senator Chuck Schumer, and New York governor George Pataki. At the time, the building had 4,200 employees. The building had cost over $500 million to build, half of which was the cost of the equipment. As a tax-avoidance measure, the bank held a synthetic lease on the building, which was worth $570 million.

=== Operation ===
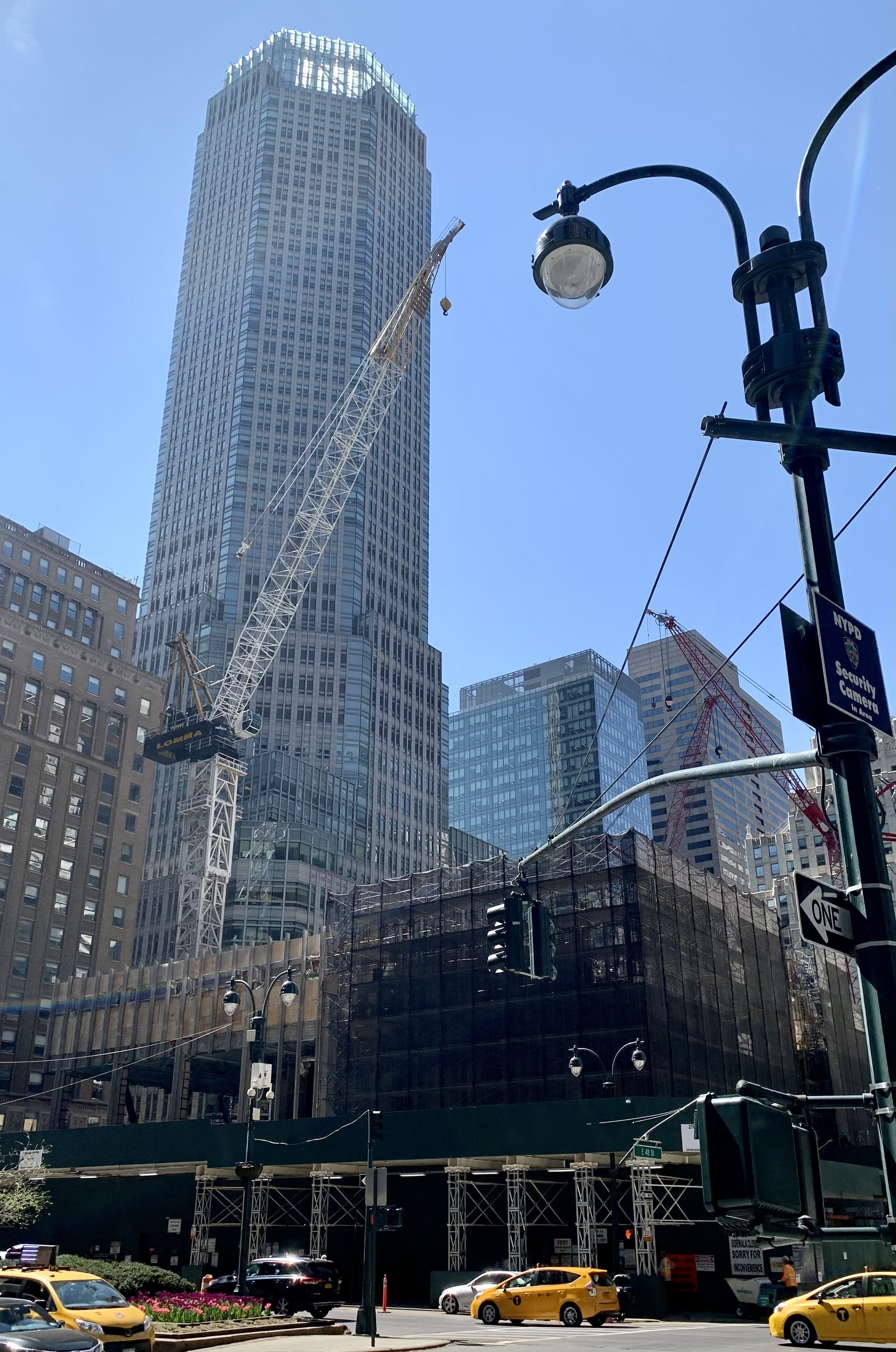
383 Madison Avenue in background with ongoing demolition of 270 Park Avenue in foreground, April 2021

Four of the seven trading floors were in operation when the building opened, providing space for 1,250 traders. The haberdasher Charles Tyrwhitt was among the building's original retail tenants. Due to security concerns following the attacks, Bear Stearns initially prohibited visitors from going to the upper floors unless they were accompanied by an employee. Cayne had liked the building's location because he could walk to it from his apartment 13 blocks away. In 2007, just five years after the building had opened, Bear Stearns became involved in the subprime mortgage crisis when two of its subprime hedge funds lost nearly all of their value.

Following the hedge funds' collapse, Bear Stearns faced sudden bankruptcy in March 2008 during the 2008 financial crisis. JPMorgan Chase initially offered to buy Bear Stearns $2 a share, which would have valued the latter at $250 million. Real-estate experts estimated the building's value at $1.1 to $1.4 billion, so 383 Madison Avenue would have been worth five times as much as Bear Stearns itself. At the end of May 2008, JPMorgan Chase acquired Bear Stearns for $10 a share. Rather than sell 383 Madison Avenue, JPMorgan Chase planned to move its investment division there. The bank immediately started replacing Bear Stearns signage with a logo that resembled J.P. Morgan & Co., its predecessor investment bank. This allowed JPMorgan Chase to reduce the space it occupied at other buildings.

By 2014, JPMorgan Chase was looking to develop a new corporate campus in the Hudson Yards development, relocating from 270 Park and 383 Madison. The bank dropped its plans after failing to secure tax exemptions from the city and state governments. In 2016, SL Green Realty proposed that JPMorgan Chase swap 270 Park and 383 Madison with One Vanderbilt, a skyscraper that SL Green was constructing five blocks south. Though JPMorgan Chase considered the proposal, the two firms never entered into formal negotiations. In February 2018, JPMorgan Chase announced it would demolish 270 Park to make way for the JPMorgan Chase Tower on the same site, which would be almost twice as tall. During the project, JPMorgan moved its headquarters temporarily to 383 Madison Avenue. Deconstruction of 270 Park was completed in mid-2021, and as of 2022, the new building was estimated to be completed in 2025.

In January 2025, JPMorgan Chase hired Foster and Partners to design a renovation of 383 Madison Avenue. As part of the renovation, JPMorgan announced plans to convert part of the lobby into an extension of the adjacent sidewalk. Plans indicate that the renovation would also include replacing the facade panels and adding an entrance on Madison Avenue. The facade panels were being removed by early 2026, and the new facade was being installed by later that year.

== Reception ==
The building's design generally received mixed to negative reviews. Joseph Giovannini of New York said, "This is a building you wouldn't want to get anywhere near at a cocktail party. Dressed nearly head to toe in dour granite, and geometrically proper, it's stiff to the point of pass-out boredom." Giovannini summarized the building as being "lugubrious" and "predictable". Architectural critic Carter B. Horsley wrote that, compared to the pinnacles of the Chrysler Building and the Empire State Building, "this beacon is not dainty and is very bright." Herbert Muschamp of The New York Times, in describing SOM's work, said: "Skidmore specializes in period pastiche versions of Art Deco skyscrapers, like the new Bear, Stearns building in Midtown Manhattan." In 2010, the New York Daily News ranked 383 Madison as one of New York City's ten ugliest buildings.

== See also ==
- List of tallest buildings in New York City
- List of tallest buildings in the United States
