= Richard Marin =

Richard Marin may refer to:

- Cheech Marin (born 1946), American comedian and actor
- Richard Marin (investment banker) (born 1953), American investment banker
