= Richard C. Perry =

American hedge fund manager

- Born: February 9, 1955 (age 71)
- Education: The Wharton School (BA); New York University Stern School of Business (MBA)
- Occupation: Hedge fund manager
- Known for: Founder of Perry Capital LLC
- Spouse: Lisa Rachel Newberger
- Parent(s): Merel Cayne Perry; Arnold Bernard Perry
- Family: James Cayne (uncle); David Perry (brother)

Richard Cayne Perry (born February 9, 1955) is an American hedge fund manager whose firm, Perry Capital LLC (closed in 2016) invested in several companies and, starting in 2012, owned a controlling interest in Barneys New York. Perry sold his controlling interest in Barneys New York in August 2019.

== Early life and education ==
Perry was born the son of Merel (née Cayne) and Arnold Perry (1925–2001). He was raised in Chicago. His mother, who ran a small import business, is the sister of former Bear Stearns C.E.O. James Cayne; his father, Arnold, ran several firms including a book publisher and a business-machine company. He moved to Manhattan at the age of 10 and when he was 13, his parents divorced. He attended the Allen-Stevenson School all-boys' private grade school in Manhattan and then high school at the Milton Academy in Milton, Massachusetts, graduating in 1973. He attended the Wharton School of the University of Pennsylvania and graduated with a B.A. in 1977. While attending Penn, his father was able to secure him an internship at Goldman Sachs where he worked directly under one of its partners, L. Jay Tenenbaum. After graduation, he was hired by Goldman Sachs on an equity options trading desk. During this time, Perry earned a M.B.A. at night from NYU's Business School.

== Career ==
He moved to the equity-arbitrage desk at Goldman Sachs run by Robert Rubin. During this time he was Rubin's teaching assistant at NYU Stern and even babysat Rubin's children. He eventually left to form Perry Capital in 1988.

Perry's first major investment was Florists' Transworld Delivery (FTD), which Perry Capital acquired in 1994 for $130 million. Among his actions was installing Meg Whitman as the C.E.O. In 2004, he sold his stake in the company for $450 million.

In 2005, he was among the investors providing a loan of $512 million for Malcolm Glazer to purchase British football team Manchester United.

In May 2012, Perry's firm acquired ownership of Barneys. Perry was the store's biggest creditor and in the takeover reduced Barneys's $590 million debt to $50 million. Perry's firm gained three seats on the seven-member board of directors, including former majority owner Istithmar World, new investor Yucaipa Companies, and Barneys's current C.E.O. Mark Lee.

From 2014, Perry Capital LLC became a major shareholder in the ailing Cooperative Bank in Manchester, UK, with a seat on the Board.

Over the fund's first two decades, Perry posted an average return of 15 percent, peaking at $15.5 billion in assets in 2007. In September 2016, Perry announced he would be closing his hedge fund after assets under management fell 60% between late 2014 and 2016. In August 2019, Barneys New York was "sold for parts" to Authentic Brands Group and he ceased to be the company's majority owner.

== Personal life ==
In 1985, he married Lisa Rachel Newberger in Manhattan. They reside in a remodeled 17-room townhouse on New York City's Sutton Place. He purchased the property in 2000 for $10.9 million. The domicile is filled with some of the best examples of Pop art, which have inspired the clothing style of his wife. In November 2019, he put a residential property in Palm Beach, Florida up for sale, after purchasing it in May 2018 with his wife and remodeling it.

Perry is an ardent supporter of Democratic Party-associated causes, institutions, and people, including President Obama. Perry serves as a board member of the Israel Project and in 2010 co-hosted along with Seth Klarman an event for Ziad Asali, the founder and president of the American Task Force on Palestine.

Perry’s brother, David Perry, was the founder and CEO of TeamCo Advisors, a San Francisco based hedge fund advisor that announced its closure in 2017.
