= Tour Zamansky =

Office skyscraper in Paris

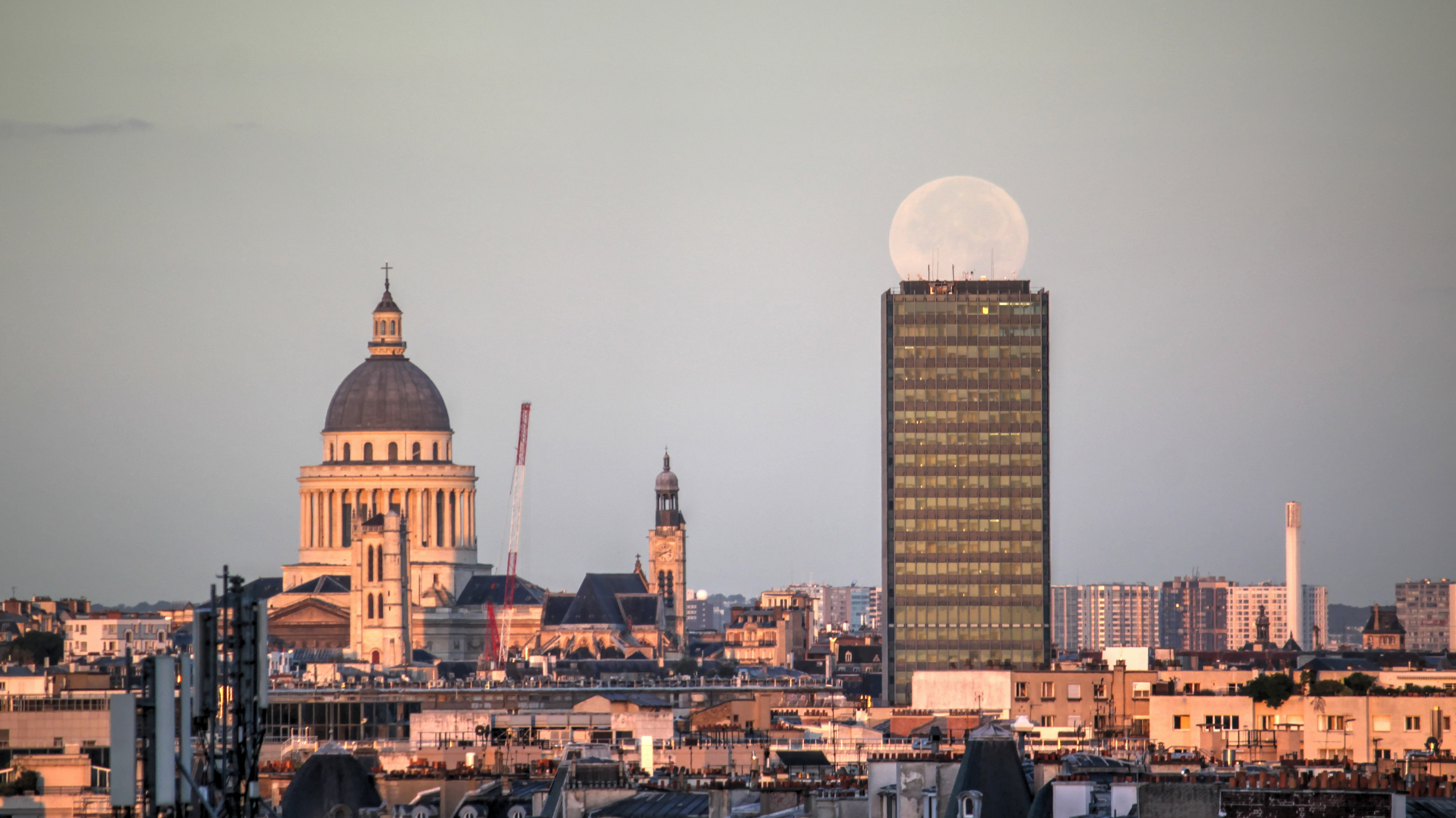
- Tour Zamanski in 2017
- Former names: Tour Jussieu; Tour Z Tour Centrale la tour

General information
- Status: Completed
- Type: Commercial offices
- Architectural style: Modernism
- Location: Jussieu Campus
- Coordinates: 48.8468867°N 2.3554968°E
- Completed: 1970
- Renovated: 2006 –2009
- Owner: Sorbonne University

Height
- Antenna spire: 93 m (305 ft)
- Roof: 90 m (300 ft)

Technical details
- Floor count: 28

Design and construction
- Architect: Édouard Albert

Tour Zamansky or Tour Jussieu, is a skyscraper in the 5th arrondissement of Paris. Located in the middle of the Jussieu Campus, it houses the administrative offices of Sorbonne University. It is named after Marc Zamansky, Dean of the Faculty of Sciences of Paris from 1963 to 1970. It is commonly called the "Jussieu Tower" by Parisians, and the "Central Tower," "Z Tower," or simply "the Tower" by campus users. The term "the Tower" is also often used metonymically to refer to the administrative offices themselves.

Standing 90 meters tall, it is the 115th tallest building in the Île-de-France region. It comprises 28 levels: a ground floor, two mezzanines, 24 regular floors, and a technical floor. On the roof of the building are four masts supporting various antennas, bringing the total height to 93 meters.

== History ==
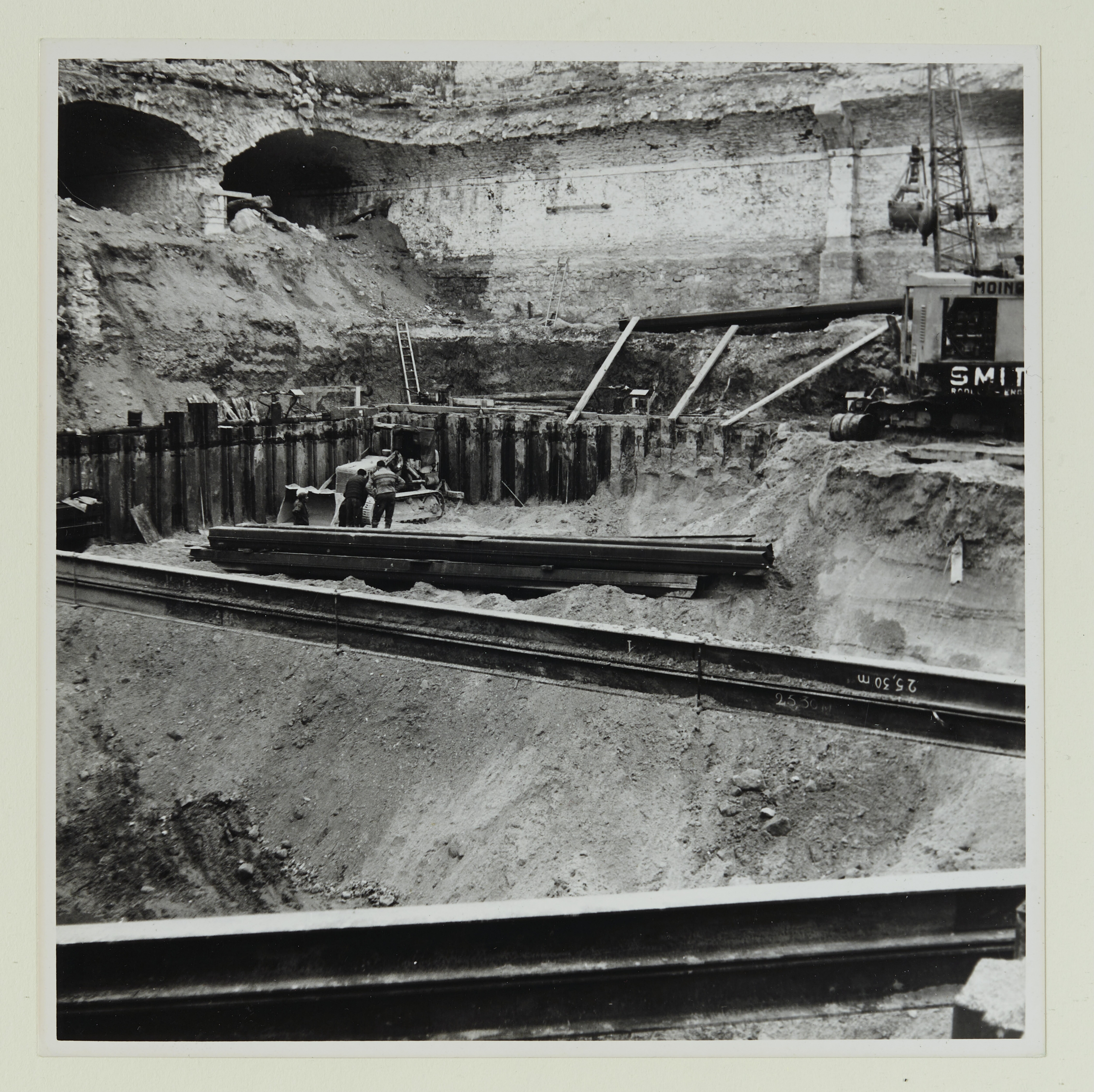
Black and white photograph of the "CPCU seen from the excavation site from the concrete plant," 1965.

In the late 1950s, the Faculty of Sciences in Paris sought to expand. The first buildings on the Jussieu campus were constructed. Édouard Albert then planned the construction of a quadrangle including a tower. After his death, the project was modified by the architects Cassan, Coulon, and Richard. The tower was finally built in 1970.

During the campus renovation, the question of demolishing the tower arose, particularly due to its low profitability, but it would have been difficult to find an equivalent surface area. The tower was evacuated and its asbestos removed starting in 2004. The construction work itself began in late 2006, directed by the architect Thierry Van de Wyngaert. On June 22, 2009, the tower was handed over to Pierre and Marie Curie University.

== Climbing record ==
In 2016, following its renovation, the Zamansky Tower was used for a vertical race up its stairs to mark the inauguration of the Jussieu campus on September 30th. The men's record for the ascent (starting from the plaza in front of Tower 45) was 2 minutes and 26 seconds.

A second edition of the vertical race took place on June 4, 2024, during which a women's record was set at 3 minutes and 35 seconds.

Furthermore, in September 2018, an hourly record (maximum number of ascents and descents in one hour) was set at 10 round trips plus 6 floors, which corresponds to 286 floors (920 meters of elevation gain) and 280 floors (900 meters of elevation loss) in one hour.

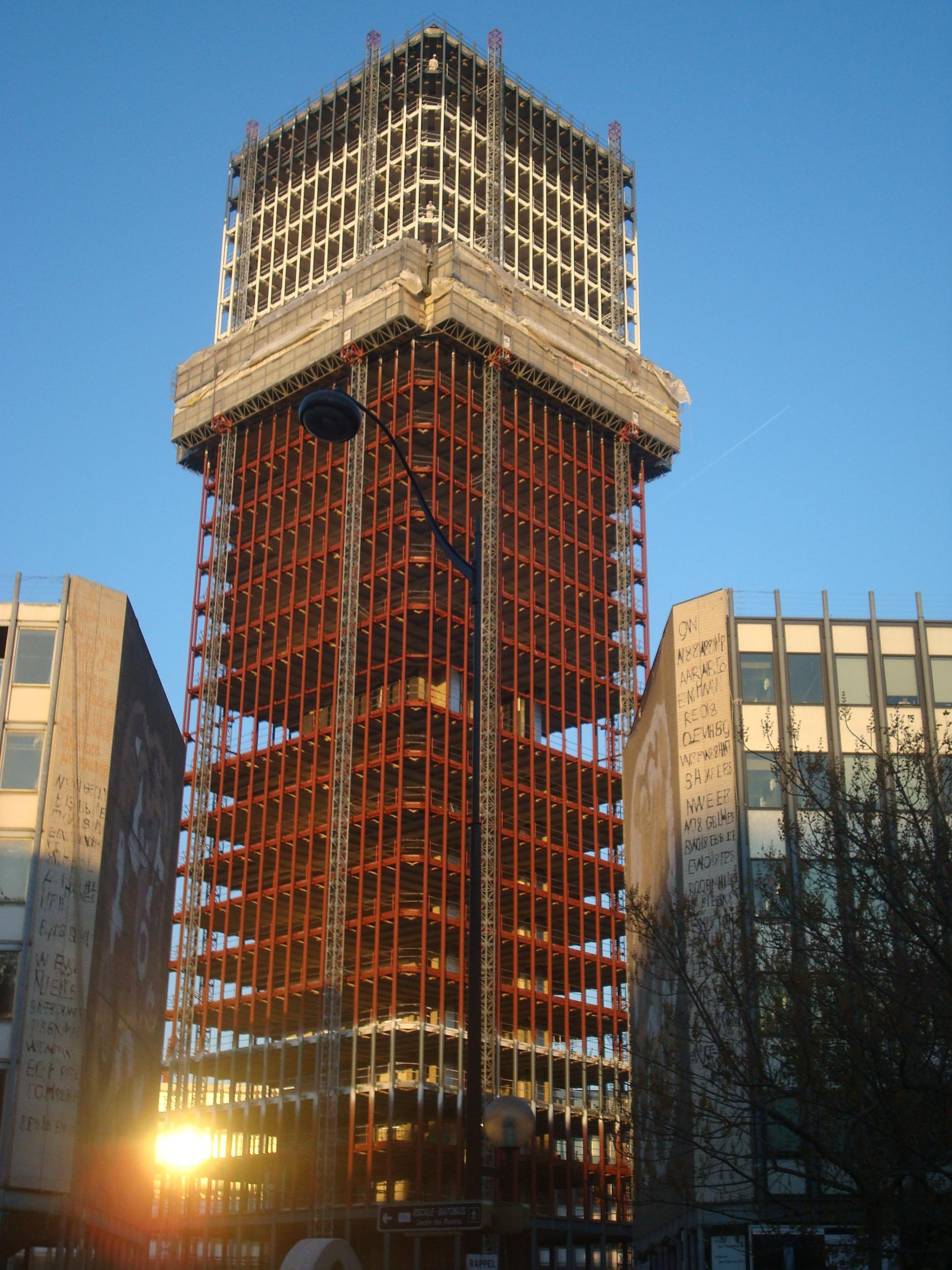
In 2007, after the asbestos removal.

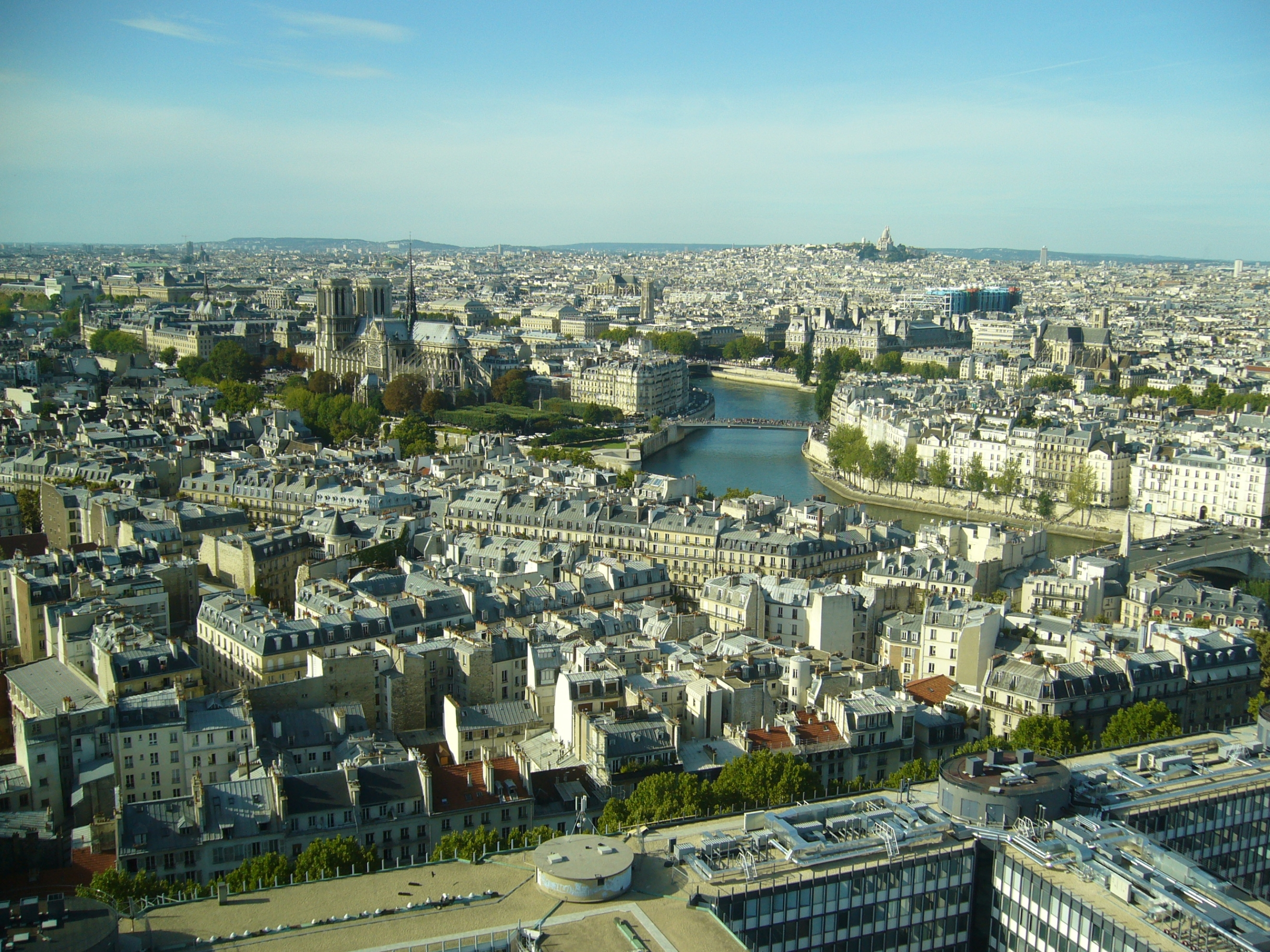
View from the 24th floor of the tower.

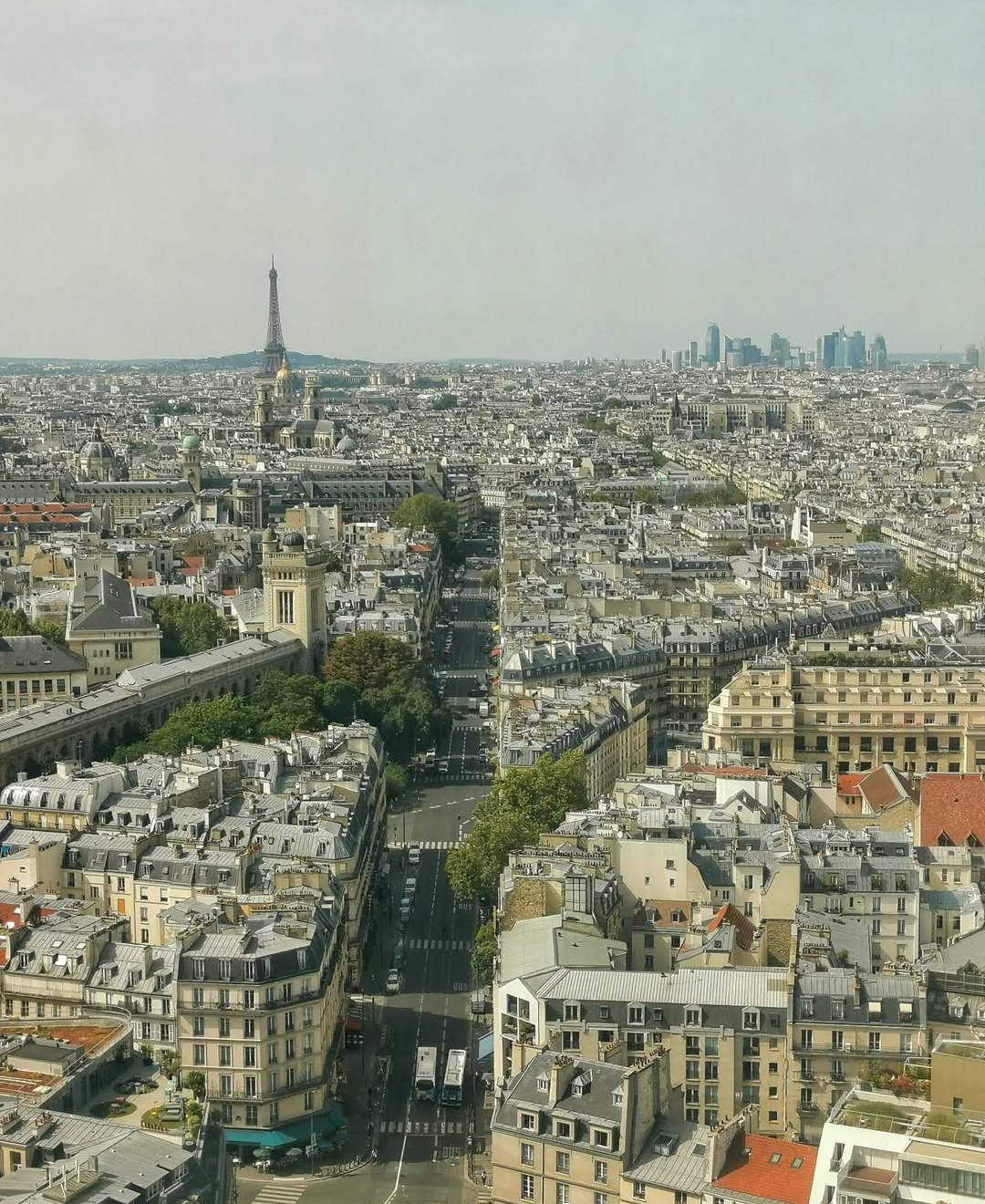
View from the top of the Zamansky Tower

== Use ==
The Zamansky Tower houses the administrative offices of Sorbonne University, a new institution resulting from the merger of the Paris-Sorbonne University and the Pierre and Marie Curie University. Some rooms are rented out (for events, filming): a reception area (panoramic room, for 120 to 140 people) and eight meeting rooms (a panoramic room for 32 people on the 23rd floor, seven rooms for 12 to 36 people on the 10th floor).

== Bibliography ==
- Bertrand Lemoine, La Tour Jussieu en chantier, 2004-2009, Archibooks, Paris, 2010. ISBN 978-2357331020
