= Alan C. Greenberg =

American businessman (1927–2014)

- Born: Alan Courtney Greenberg; September 3, 1927; Wichita, Kansas, U.S.
- Died: July 25, 2014 (aged 86); New York City, U.S.
- Education: University of Missouri (BA)
- Occupation: Businessman
- Known for: Chairman and CEO of Bear Stearns
- Spouses: Ann Greenberg (m. 1954; div. 1976) Kathryn A. Olson (m. 1987)
- Children: 2

Alan Courtney "Ace" Greenberg (September 3, 1927 – July 25, 2014) was an American businessman who was an executive at The Bear Stearns Companies, Inc., serving as its CEO from 1978 to 1993 and Chairman of the Board from 1985 to 2001.

== Early life and education ==
Greenberg was born in Wichita, Kansas but raised in Oklahoma City in an upper-middle-class neighborhood to a Jewish family, one of three children of Theodore and Esther Greenberg. His father owned a woman's clothing store and was part of an extended family that operated clothing stores in Kansas, Oklahoma and Missouri. Greenberg first attended the University of Oklahoma on a football scholarship. After injuring his back, he transferred to the University of Missouri, from which he graduated with a B.A. in business in 1949. He was a brother of Zeta Beta Tau. Greenberg pursued a career on Wall Street after college, accepting a position as a clerk at Bear Stearns for $32.50 per week.

== Career ==
Greenberg rose through the ranks of Bear Stearns eventually serving as its CEO from 1978 to 1993 and Chairman of the Board from 1985 to 2001. Greenberg also served as a non-executive director of Viacom. He was the author of Memos from the Chairman, which is a compilation of memos he issued to the associates of Bear Stearns during his tenure as CEO. In 1969, Greenberg hired James Cayne as a stockbroker at Bear Stearns. In 1993, Greenberg was ousted and replaced as CEO by Cayne. Cayne served as CEO until January 2008 and was succeeded by Alan Schwartz, who oversaw the firm's demise in March 2008.

While serving as chairman of the executive committee of Bear Stearns, Greenberg oversaw the collapse of the company in March 2008. He was subsequently involved in the talks with JPMorgan Chase which eventually bought out the failing company. Fortune reported that Greenberg agreed to join JPMC as vice chairman of Bear's retail business. Greenberg was the financier of Kaufman and Greenberg, a company he set up with Richard Kaufman to publish magic books.

== Philanthropy ==
- Greenberg was a member of the Society of American Magicians. In 1998, Greenberg donated $1 million to New York City's Hospital for Special Surgery to underwrite sildenafil prescriptions for impotent men without necessary income.
- UJA-Federation of New York named him "a giant in our community and a stalwart champion of the Jewish people, both at home and in Israel."
- Greenberg stated and he told People that his wife Kathryn told him, "You do some nutty things, you've made your money, and you can spend it any way you want."

== Personal life ==
Alan Greenberg was married twice:

- His first wife was Ann Greenberg, whom he divorced in 1976. They have two children:
  - Lynne Koeppel who was the first woman to own a seat on the American Stock Exchange. She later gave up her seat to focus on raising her two children, Allison and Melissa Frey. In 1991, she and her first husband, Jonathan Frey, divorced. Frey and his father-in-law engaged in a very public lawsuit over unpaid interest on a loan Greenberg had made to Frey for the purchase of the newly married couple's first home, a lawsuit Greenberg lost. Lynne is remarried to Caleb Koeppel, son of Alfred J. Koeppel.
  - Ted Greenberg who works, as his father did, in risk arbitrage at Dresdner Kleinwort, a subsidiary of Dresdner Bank in New York City. Ted is a graduate of Harvard University and was also a writer in the 1980s for Late Night with David Letterman on NBC. Ted is married to Kathleen Marie Cigich (maiden name Durst).
- In 1987, he married 40-year-old Kathryn A. Olson who is the board chair of Cardozo School of Law and the founder of the New York Legal Assistance Group.

In 2003, Greenberg contributed a note to Jeffrey Epstein's birthday book.

=== Death ===
On July 25, 2014, Greenberg died of cancer.

== Bridge accomplishments ==
Greenberg was an avid bridge player, having won the Reisinger Board-a-Match Teams in 1977. In 1981, he won the Maccabiah Games teams bridge tournament and was second in the Reisinger later that year.

=== Wins ===
- North American Bridge Championships (1)
  - Reisinger (1) 1977

=== Runner-up finishes ===
- North American Bridge Championships (1)
  - Reisinger (1) 1981
