= Samanski =

Samanski is a surname. Notable people with the surname include:

- John Samanski (born 1962), Canadian ice hockey centre and coach
- Josh Samanski (born 2002), German and Canadian ice hockey forward, son of the above

== See also ==
- Zamansky
- Zemanski
