= Robert B. Stearns =

American financier

- Born: 1888
- Died: 14 December 1954 (aged 66)
- Education: Yale University (BA)
- Occupation: Banker
- Known for: Co-founder of Bear Stearns
- Spouse(s): Bernice Marks (divorced); Margaret Allen
- Children: 3
- Family: Marcus M. Marks (father-in-law)

Robert B. Stearns (1888 – 14 December 1954) was a prominent American financier. He co-founded investment bank Bear Stearns in 1923.

== Early life ==
Stearns was born in a Jewish family in 1888 to Virginia (née Michaels) and Isaac, founder of Stern's Department Stores. He graduated from Phillips Academy, Andover in 1906 and Yale University in 1910. He may have changed his name when he enrolled at Andover, whose headmaster at the time was Alfred Stearns.

== Wall Street career ==
After working some years in Europe, Stearns worked at the brokerage J.J. Danzig & Co. before founding Bear Stearns with partners Joseph Ainslie Bear and Harold C. Mayer in 1923. He became a member of the New York Curb Exchange, later the American Stock Exchange in 1929, and would eventually be its chairman.

== Death ==
Stearns married twice. His first wife was Bernice Marks, daughter of Manhattan Borough President, Marcus M. Marks; they had three children, Veronica Stearns Lamy (married to actor Douglas N. Lamy), Pamela Stearns Baron, and Roland B. Stearns, before divorcing. His second wife was Margaret Allen. Stearns died at Roosevelt Hospital in Manhattan on 14 December 1954, aged 66.
