= Joseph Ainslie Bear =

American banker

- Born: Joseph Ainslie Bear; May 28, 1878; Louisville, Kentucky
- Died: July 13, 1955 (aged 77)
- Occupation: Banker
- Known for: Co-founder of Bear Stearns
- Spouse: Julia Pam

Joseph Ainslie Bear (May 28, 1878 – July 13, 1955) was an American banker who co-founded the investment bank Bear Stearns.

== Early life and education ==
Bear was born to a Jewish family on May 28, 1878, in Louisville, Kentucky. He was educated in France, Germany, and Switzerland.

== Career ==
He worked at the bond trading firm J.J. Danzig where he met Harold C. Mayer and Robert B. Stearns. In 1923, they founded Bear Stearns with $500,000 in capital.

== Personal life ==
His first wife was Julia Pam, sister of judge Hugo Pam.
