= Jeffrey Epstein's birthday book =

2003 gift to the American financier and sex offender

The First Fifty Years
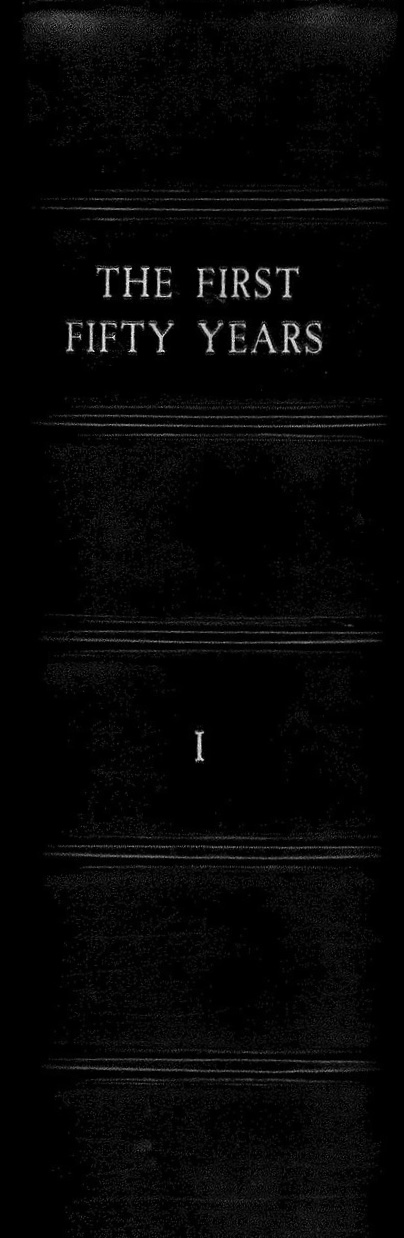
- Spine of the first volume of The First Fifty Years
- Editor: Ghislaine Maxwell
- Language: English
- Publication date: September 8, 2025
- Pages: 238

In 2003, friends and associates of American financier Jeffrey Epstein—who would later, in 2008, be convicted of sexual offenses against minors—gave him a three-volume bound album with personalized greetings for his 50th birthday, entitled The First Fifty Years. The album was assembled by Epstein's close friend, Ghislaine Maxwell, with help from assistants. She asked for "drawings, photos or stories" from associates of Epstein.

The existence of the book was first reported in a July 2025 article by The Wall Street Journal. The article also detailed a letter from the book that was allegedly written and signed by Donald Trump, the U.S. president at the time the article was published; the letter was described as featuring a hand-drawn outline of a naked woman and ending with the valediction "may every day be another wonderful secret". The article was published at a time when Trump's former relationship with Epstein was coming under heavy scrutiny. Trump denied the legitimacy of the letter and attempted to sue for $10 billion. The book also features a letter from former U.S. president Bill Clinton. The contents of the book were made public by the House Oversight Committee in September 2025.

== Contents ==
Drawing of Epstein gifting lollipops and balloons to young girls, alongside him receiving massages from topless women 20 years later

The book comprises three volumes. In her introduction to the album, Ghislaine Maxwell wrote that she had intended to "gather stories and old photographs to jog your memory about places, people and different events. Some of the letters will definitely achieve their intended goal—some well... you will have to read them to see for yourself." In a 2025 interview with Todd Blanche, Maxwell tells that she got the idea from when her mother, Elizabeth Maxwell made a birthday book for Robert Maxwell's 60th birthday. When Blanche asked Maxwell what she asked of contributors, she said "It's his 50th birthday, say anything you want on a piece of paper".

The Wall Street Journal described many of the birthday greetings as "anodyne" but wrote that others were "bawdy and made crude jokes about sex". Multiple digital copies of the album have been created. The album was reviewed by officials from the U.S. Department of Justice during their investigation into Epstein and his sex trafficking scandals. In August 2025, The New York Times published letters sent to Epstein for his 63rd birthday in 2016.

One unsigned drawing captioned "What a great country!" shows Epstein gifting lollipops and balloons to young girls, labelled 1983, juxtaposed with another drawing of Epstein receiving massages from topless women, labelled 2003. One of the women has Epstein's initials "JE" tattooed on her buttocks. Epstein's infamous Lolita Express private jet appears in the background. The Guardian described the drawing as "one of the most striking images in the collection". Isa Farfan, writing for Hyperallergic, called it "one of the most overt allusions to Epstein's criminal behavior in the book".

=== Partial list of contributors ===
Contributors to the album were sorted into the groups "Family", "Brooklyn", "Business", "Girlfriends", "Children", "Friends", "Science", "Girl-Friends", "Special Assistants" and "The Next 50 Years". The letter attributed to Donald Trump was framed by the outline of a naked woman with several lines of typewritten text imagining a conversation between the pair, with them implying something that's "more to life than having everything." They agree they "have certain things in common," with language intimating a prior mutual awareness of these things. One of the final lines: "Enigmas never age, have you noticed that?" sparked controversy regarding the authenticity of the note originally with the defense that "enigma" isn't a word Trump used, although video of Trump extemporaneously using the word on several occasions quickly surfaced.

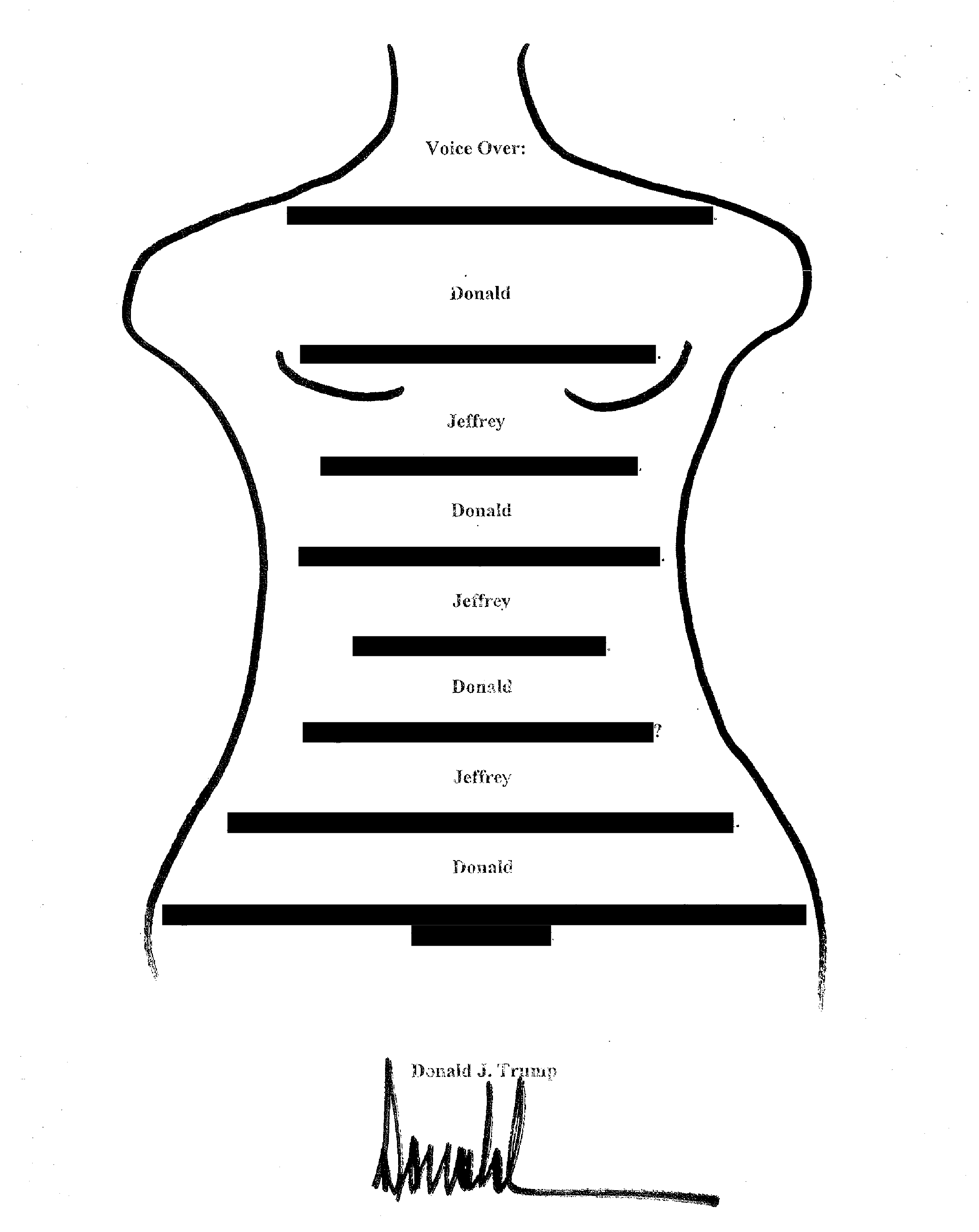
Birthday letter to Jeffrey Epstein attributed to Donald Trump (text redacted due to potential copyright concerns)

The letter ends saying "may every day be another wonderful secret." The Wall Street Journal described the drawing as "[appearing] to be hand-drawn with a heavy marker. A pair of small arcs denotes the female's breasts, and [Trump's] signature is a squiggly 'Donald' below her waist, mimicking pubic hair". After Epstein's estate provided a copy of the album to Congress, the Journal published a copy of the letter with the drawing and Trump's signature.

Editor of The New York Independent Keith Girard pointed to the problematic nature of Trump's relationship with Epstein and Ghislaine Maxwell. He described the birthday card Trump gave to Epstein: "The card included an outline of a prepubescent, small-breasted nude girl, signed by Trump in a spot that suggestively looked like pubic hair." Girard also noted Trump's message and summarized: "Taken together, it's hard to conclude anything other than Trump reveled in their shared secret—having sex with underage girls. It's as close to a contemporaneous admission as you can possibly get."

Leon Black contributed a "handwritten poem with a rhyme scheme" which included the acronym "V.F.P.C." which stood for "Vanity Fair Poster Child". This was in reference to a profile of Epstein that was being written for the magazine. The poem contained the lines "Blonde, Red or Brunette, spread out geographically/With this net of fish, Jeff's now The Old Man and The Sea". He signed the poem "Love and kisses, Leon".

Bill Clinton wrote, "It's reassuring isn't it, to have lasted as long, across all the years of learning and knowing, adventures and errors, and also to have your childlike curiosity, the drive to make a difference and the solace of friends". Alan Dershowitz's contribution was a pretend Vanity Unfair magazine cover "with mock headlines". Nathan Myhrvold sent photographs from a recent trip to Africa that he had taken which "seemed more appropriate than anything I could put in words". The photographs included "a monkey screaming, lions and zebras mating, and a zebra with its penis visible".

Vera Wang's contribution suggested they go on a shopping trip and joked about Epstein appearing on The Bachelor television series. Les Wexner's letter had a "line drawing of what appeared to be a woman's breasts" alongside a short message. Mortimer Zuckerman's letter joked about having looked for information on Epstein in the New York Daily News, of which he was part owner, and said that Epstein was "born in Liechtenstein and had a wife and three children". Martin Nowak contributed several pages referring to his work on the evolution of language and evolutionary dynamics. Other contributors include Jean-Luc Brunel, James Cayne, Epstein's brother Mark Epstein, Murray Gell-Mann, Alan C. Greenberg, and Peter Mandelson.

== Release ==
The existence of the album was made public with the publication of a July 17, 2025 article in The Wall Street Journal titled "Jeffrey Epstein's Friends Sent Him Bawdy Letters for a 50th Birthday Album. One Was From Donald Trump". The article was published amidst the maelstrom surrounding Trump's relationship with Epstein in mid 2025. A second article, titled "Jeffrey Epstein's Birthday Book Included Letters From Bill Clinton, Leon Black" was published on July 25, 2025. The full album was released and published online in September 2025 by House Oversight Committee.

== Reactions ==
Several contributors reacted to the publication of The Wall Street Journal articles on the album in July 2025. Many contributors had since disavowed and publicly regretted their relationship with Epstein. Myhrvold said he did not recall his submission, and that he "regularly shares photos of and writes about animal behavior" as a wildlife photographer. Trump disowned the letter prior to publication of the Wall Street Journal article in 2025, saying, "This is not me. This is a fake thing. It's a fake Wall Street Journal story" and that he "never wrote a picture in my life. I don't draw pictures of women ... It's not my language. It's not my words." Trump subsequently sued The Wall Street Journal's publisher, Dow Jones, parent company News Corp and their executives, and the reporters of the article for $10 billion in damages. Black, Clinton and Wexner declined to comment. Zuckerman and Wang did not respond to requests for comment. Dershowitz could not recall his contribution.

U.S. representatives Ro Khanna and Robert Garcia requested a copy of the book by August 10, 2025, as they deemed it essential to their congressional oversight of the Epstein controversy and the Trump administration. On September 8, 2025, Democrats on the House Oversight Committee released a letter matching a description of the one that was allegedly signed by Trump. That evening, Representative Jasmine Crockett emphasized on CNN that the material had come from the Epstein estate, not from a partisan source. Upon the release of the album, White House press secretary Karoline Leavitt denied that Trump drew the image, further stating that his "legal team will continue to aggressively pursue litigation". Trump also told NBC News that the letter was a "dead issue".

Peter Mandelson, who was the British ambassador to the United States when the book became public, was dismissed from his position by the British prime minister Keir Starmer on September 11. A day before that, further communication between Mandelson and Epstein was published, and the content of the information showed a supportive attitude from Mandelson to Epstein. Although Starmer supported Mandelson during the Prime Minister's Questions of the same day, he dismissed him on the following day. After the dismissal, Minister of State for North America Stephen Doughty said "the depth and extent of Peter Mandelson's relationship with Jeffrey Epstein is materially different from that known at the time of his appointment. In light of that, and mindful of the victims of Epstein's appalling crimes, he has been withdrawn as ambassador with immediate effect." In January 2026, activists created an art project with a giant copy of the Trump Epstein card on the National Mall, timed with Epstein's birthday and the first anniversary of the second Trump administration's inauguration.

In a 2025 interview with Todd Blanche, Ghislaine Maxwell claims that she does not remember anything submitted by Trump.

In April 2026, a judge dismissed Trump's lawsuit against the Wall Street Journal, writing that Trump "has not plausibly alleged that Defendants published the Article with actual malice." Trump amended his complaint with new allegations, but it was dismissed with prejudice in October 2026.
