= Alan Schwartz =

American business executive

- Born: 1950 or 1951 (age 75–76); New York City, New York, U.S.
- Education: Duke University
- Occupation: Executive chairman of Guggenheim Partners
- Known for: President and CEO of Bear Stearns
- Spouse: Nancy Seaman
- Children: 5

Alan David Schwartz is an American businessman and is the executive chairman of Guggenheim Partners, an investment banking firm based in Chicago and New York City. He was previously the last president and chief executive officer of Bear Stearns when the Federal Reserve Bank of New York forced its March 2008 acquisition by JPMorgan Chase & Co.

== Early life and education ==
Born in Bay Ridge, Brooklyn, he is the son of a Jewish traveling salesman and Presbyterian housewife from Kansas. Schwartz is a 1972 graduate of Duke University. There he pitched on the baseball team as a scholarship athlete, making the ACC academic honor roll three times. He was drafted as a pitcher by the Cincinnati Reds but never reported due to an injury.

== Career ==
Alan Schwartz joined Bear Stearns in 1976, first working in Dallas. In 1979, he was appointed the director of research and investment in New York City. In 1985, he became executive vice president and head of Bear Stearns' Investment Banking Division. He became Co-President and Co-COO on June 25, 2001. Schwartz became sole President and COO in August 2007 after Warren Spector (the original heir-apparent to Chairman and CEO Jimmy Cayne) was forced to resign in the wake of the collapse of two hedge funds, which foreshadowed the upcoming subprime mortgage crisis and financial meltdown. Schwartz became CEO in January 2008.

When Schwartz became CEO, Bear Stearns stock traded around $75 per share; however, the share price continued to drop as the financial crisis worsened over 2007-08. Within a week of its near collapse and merger with JPMorgan Chase on March 16, 2008, the shares were trading at $5.33 per share. After the deal with JPMorgan was announced, the fire sale price of the stock prompted a reportedly angry confrontation between Schwartz and senior trader Alan Mintz in the company gym. Schwartz stayed on with JPMorgan for a short while to manage the transition but declined a permanent senior position with the firm. Schwartz also turned down offers from rival investment banks Goldman Sachs and Morgan Stanley.

In June 2009, Schwartz became executive chairman of Guggenheim Partners, an investment banking firm based in Chicago and New York. According to Schwartz, the new job meant "fate has dealt [him] an opportunity to start from scratch." Schwartz is also the chairman of the Board of Visitors at the Fuqua School of Business at Duke and is a trustee on the Duke University Board of Trustees. In 1994, Schwartz was elected to the Common Cause National Governing Board.

In 2006, he was a founding board member of the Robin Hood Foundation.

== Personal life ==
Schwartz resides in Greenwich, Connecticut, with his wife, Nancy Seaman, chairman of Houlihan Lawrence Realty Corporation. They have five children.
