= G. Ware Travelstead =

American property developer (1938–2021)

Gooch Ware Travelstead
- Born: March , 1938; United States
- Died: October 19, 2021 (aged 83)
- Other name: "G" Travelstead
- Occupation: Property developer
- Known for: Original designer and promoter of the Canary Wharf financial district

Gooch Ware "G" Travelstead (March 1938 – October 19, 2021) was an American property developer and entrepreneur. Born in Kentucky in 1938, he was the head of First Boston Real Estate, a subsidiary of Credit Suisse First Boston, Travelstead was the original designer and promoter of the Canary Wharf financial estate in London.

== Early life and family ==
Travelstead came from a Kentucky family. His grandmother Nelle Gooch Travelstead was the daughter of a prominent Democratic state politician and was a teacher.

His father Will Gooch Travelstead was an engineer and businessman who owned Travelstead Construction Company in Baltimore, Maryland. He was involved in the construction of many projects such as the World Trade Center building, and also was the subcontractor for the construction of Cape Kennedy. He and his first wife were the parents of two children, G. Ware Travelstead and Malcolm Travelstead.

After retiring in 1975, Will Travelstead returned to Bowling Green, Kentucky and lived in a vacation home until he could complete renovation of the old family home, Travelogs. Will Travelstead died in 1981.

== Career ==
During the 1980s Credit Suisse First Boston made him the head of their real estate division, which provided US$37 million in financing for Travelstead's projects.

Among these projects, Travelstead was the original promoter of the London Docklands project, convincing the Lower London Development Commission to start the project.

Travelstead promoted the development of Barcelona's run-down port area in the run up to the Olympic Games of 1992, working with Bruce Graham of Skidmore, Owings and Merrill to create the scheme which later became Porto Olimpico. He was behind the design and development of the Hotel Arts, a 45-storey, 600-room luxury hotel, together with Japanese company Sogo. However, later the hotel was acquired by Deutsche Bank.

In the early 1990s Travelstead proposed a 74-story 1,400,000 sq ft (130,000 m^{2}) tower at 383 Madison Avenue. Designed by Kohn Pedersen Fox, the building was to have an elegant crown of screens at the top and to be about the same height as the Chrysler Building. Unfortunately he was unable to acquire sufficient "air rights" to build the tower - and embarked on an innovative attempt to acquire such rights in a swap from Grand Central Terminal. The City of New York opposed this development and changed the rules to prevent this from being attempted again. Without the air rights the building was unviable and his development partners pulled out in 1993. The new Bear Stearns headquarters was built on the 383 Madison Avenue site.

== Death ==
Travelstead died on October 19, 2021, at the age of 83.

== See also ==
Canary Wharf
