= Richard Marin (investment banker) =

American investment banker

Rich Marin
- Born: Richard A. Marin; January 30, 1954 (age 72); Fort Lauderdale, Florida, U.S.
- Education: Cornell University (BA); Samuel Curtis Johnson Graduate School of Management (MBA)
- Occupation: former investment banker
- Known for: former head of asset management, Bear Stearns
- Title: Managing Director, SEDA Experts LLC

Richard A. Marin (born January 30, 1954) is a former American investment banker at the former New York investment bank Bear Stearns.

== Biography ==
Marin attended Cornell University, where he obtained his B.A. in economics and government in 1975. He then attended Cornell's business school, the Johnson School, where he received an MBA in finance in 1976. Upon graduation he joined the New York bank Bankers Trust and built up the derivatives business. He spent twenty-three years at Bankers Trust and was a member of the Management Committee when they sold themselves to Deutsche Bank. After Bankers Trust was acquired by Deutsche Bank, he became the chairman of Deutsche Bank Asset Management, Inc. In March 2000, he left Deutsche Bank to found and run Beehive Ventures LLC, a New York-based venture capital fund specializing in financial services. In June 2003, he was hired by Bear Stearns to be chairman and CEO of Bear Stearns Asset Management. He went on to be chairman and CEO of AFI(USA), a $3 billion distressed commercial real estate company. Since then he was CEO of Ironwood Global, a distressed mortgage fund, and he is the former president and CEO of New York Wheel LLC, a company building a giant Ferris wheel on Staten Island. In 2019 he joined as Managing Director SEDA Experts LLC, a consulting firm providing financial services elite expert witness services. His philanthropic activities include Cornell University and CARE, the global relief and development agency.

Two of Bear Stearns' hedge funds, the "High-Grade Structured Credit Fund" and the High-Grade Structured Credit Enhanced Leveraged Fund, collapsed in June 2007, requiring bail out, and putting Marin at the center of the news. On June 22, 2007, Bear Stearns pledged a collateralized loan of up to $3.2 billion to bail out the High-Grade Structured Credit Fund. While covering the story. The New York Times, discovered that Marin had a blog, entitled "Whim of Iron," and on June 28, 2007 published what Marin had posted there. The blog had mostly innocuous entries, chiefly concerning his critiques of movies, his travel to Saudi Arabia and elsewhere, and how he lost weight after bariatric surgery. It also stated that in dealing with the crisis over Bear Stearns' hedge funds he felt like Leonidas and the Spartans fighting off the Persians in 300. Twenty-four hours later Marin was relieved from his major duties at Bear Stearns and shunted aside to a job as an adviser.

Marin's blog was accessible on June 28, 2007. As of June 29, 2007 it ceased to be accessible to the general public, but many of its entries can be read through caches.

After a several year absence, Marin has returned to the world of blogging with a new venture. The site follows his earlier efforts in reviewing theatrical films, only this time with a slant towards the world of hedge funds.
