= Bear Stearns =

Defunct American investment bank

The Bear Stearns Companies, Inc.

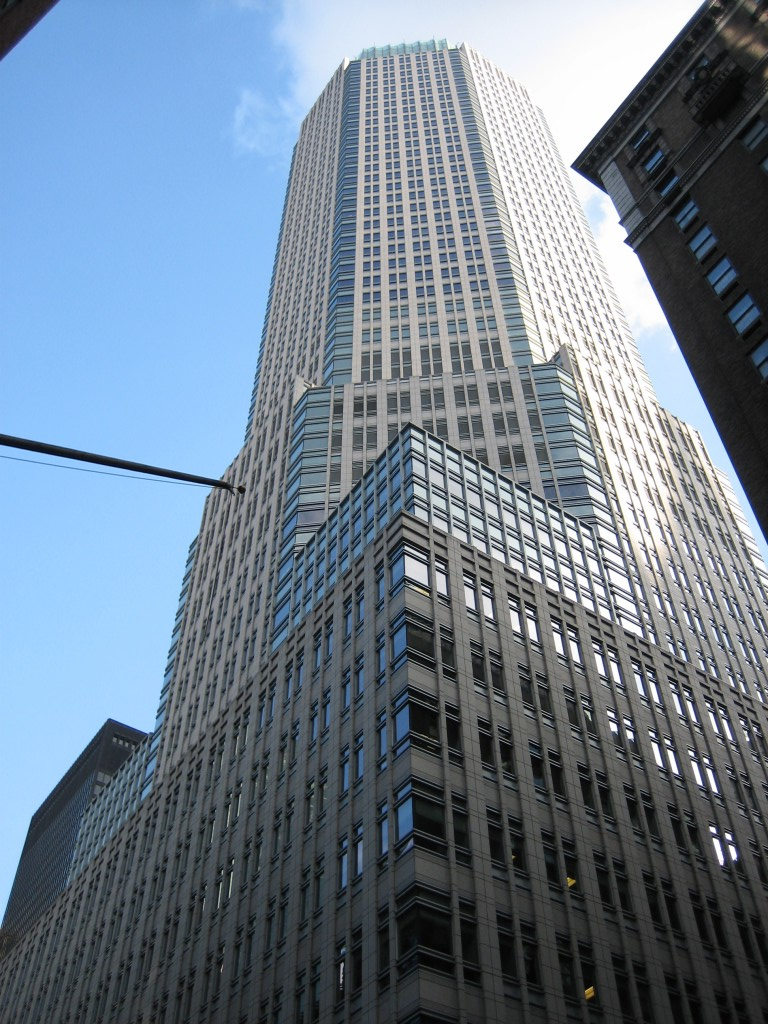
- The Bear Stearns Building, the company's former headquarters at 383 Madison Ave
- Type: Public
- Traded as: NYSE: BSC
- Industry: Investment services
- Founded: May 1, 1923; 103 years ago
- Founders: Joseph Ainslie Bear; Robert B. Stearns
- Defunct: March 16, 2008; 18 years ago
- Fate: Acquired by JPMorgan Chase
- Successor: JPMorgan Chase
- Headquarters: New York City, New York, U.S.
- Key people: Alan Schwartz (former CEO); James Cayne (former chairman and CEO); David Robert Malpass (chief economist for the last six years before its failure)
- Products: Financial services Investment banking Investment management

The Bear Stearns Companies, Inc. was an American holding company that had investment banking, securities trading, and brokerage firm operations. Its former headquarters were located at the Bear Stearns building in Manhattan, New York City.

Founded in 1923, Bear Stearns grew into the fifth-largest investment bank in the United States and at its peak it was one of the highest-performing brokerage firms on Wall Street. It was led for much of its modern history by Alan "Ace" Greenberg and later CEO James Cayne.

Bear Stearns was affected by the 2007–2008 global financial crisis due to its subprime mortgage exposure, where it was subject to a liquidity run by its customers. It was subsequently merged with JP Morgan Chase. In January 2010, JPMorgan ceased using the Bear Stearns name.

== History ==
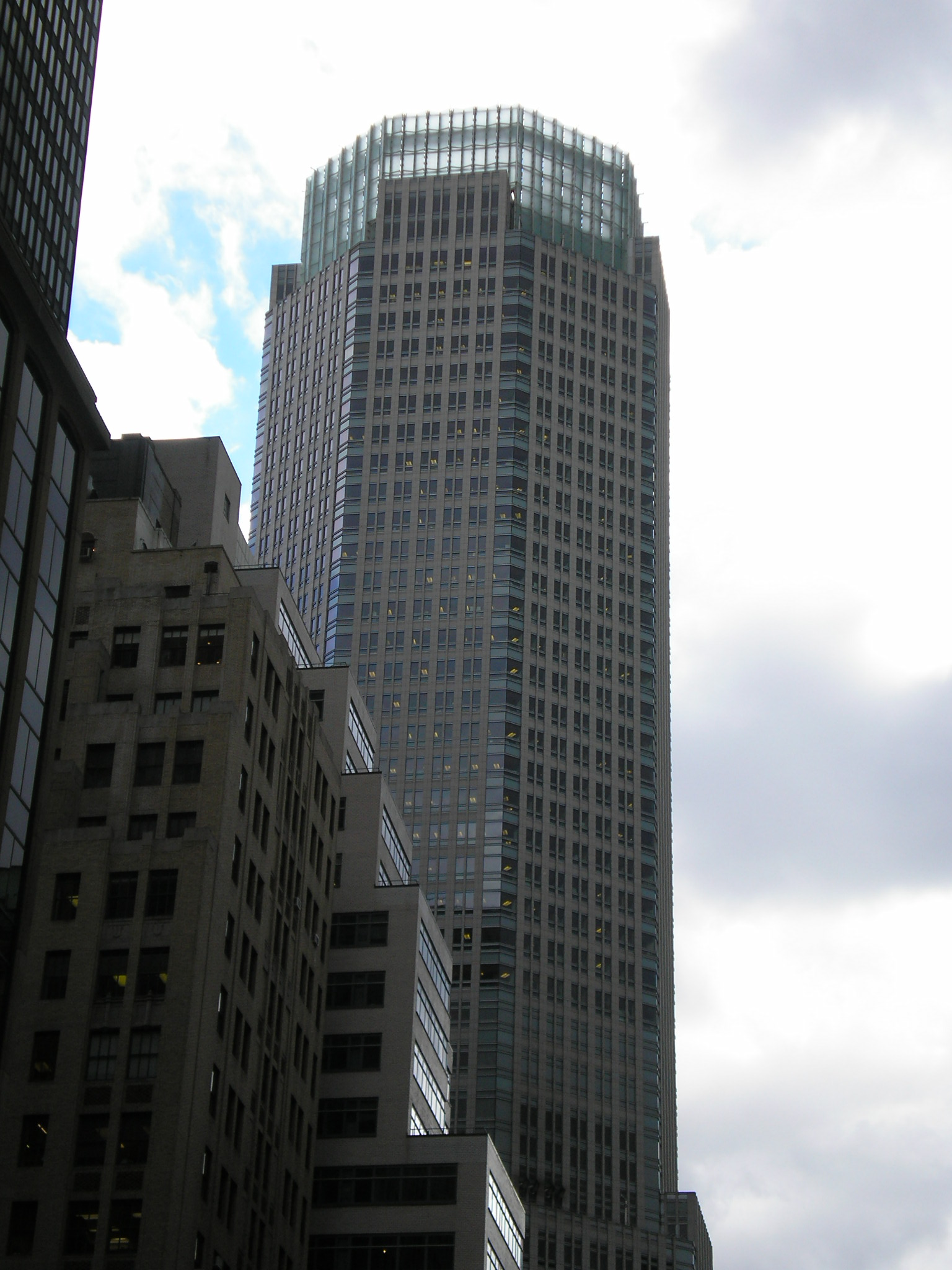
Bear Stearns' former offices at 383 Madison Avenue

Bear Stearns was founded as an equity trading house on May 1, 1923, by Joseph Ainslie Bear, Robert B. Stearns and Harold C. Mayer with $500,000 in capital (equivalent to $9,448,242 in 2025). Internal tensions quickly arose among the three founders resulting in at least one public tussling. The firm survived the Wall Street Crash of 1929 without laying off any employees and by 1933 opened its first branch office in Chicago. In 1955 the firm opened its first international office in Amsterdam.

In 1985, Bear Stearns became a publicly traded company. It served corporations, institutions, governments, and individuals. The company's business included corporate finance, mergers and acquisitions, institutional equities, fixed income sales & risk management, trading and research, private client services, derivatives, foreign exchange and futures sales and trading, asset management, and custody services. Through Bear Stearns Securities Corp., it offered global clearing services to broker dealers, prime broker clients and other professional traders, including securities lending.

Bear Stearns' World Headquarters was located at 383 Madison Avenue, between East 46th Street and East 47th Street in Manhattan. By 2007, the company employed more than 15,500 people worldwide. The firm was headquartered in New York City with offices in Atlanta, Boston, Chicago, Dallas, Denver, Houston, Los Angeles, Irvine, San Francisco, St. Louis; Whippany, New Jersey; and San Juan, Puerto Rico. Internationally the firm had offices in London, Beijing, Dublin, Frankfurt, Hong Kong, Lugano, Milan, São Paulo, Mumbai, Shanghai, Singapore and Tokyo.

In 2005–2007, Bear Stearns was recognized as the "Most Admired" securities firm in Fortune's "America's Most Admired Companies" survey, and second overall in the securities firm section. The annual survey is a prestigious ranking of employee talent, quality of risk management and business innovation. This was the second time in three years that Bear Stearns had achieved this "top" distinction.

=== Lead-up to the failure – increasing exposure to subprime mortgages ===
By November 2006, the company had total capital of approximately $66.7 billion and total assets of $350.4 billion and according to the April 2005 issue of Institutional Investor magazine, Bear Stearns was the seventh-largest securities firm in terms of total capital. A year later, Bear Stearns had notional contract amounts of approximately $13.40 trillion in derivative financial instruments, of which $1.85 trillion were listed futures and option contracts. In addition, Bear Stearns was carrying more than $28 billion in 'level 3' assets on its books at the end of fiscal 2007 versus a net equity position of only $11.1 billion. This $11.1 billion supported $395 billion in assets, which means a leverage ratio of 35.6 to 1. This highly leveraged balance sheet, consisting of many illiquid and potentially worthless assets, led to the rapid diminution of investor and lender confidence, which finally evaporated as Bear was forced to call the New York Federal Reserve to stave off the looming cascade of counterparty risk which would ensue from forced liquidation.

=== Start of the crisis – two subprime mortgage funds fail ===
On June 22, 2007, Bear Stearns pledged a collateralized loan of up to $3.2 billion to "bail out" one of its funds, the Bear Stearns High-Grade Structured Credit Fund, while negotiating with other banks to loan money against collateral to another fund, the Bear Stearns High-Grade Structured Credit Enhanced Leveraged Fund. Bear Stearns had originally put up just $25 million, so they were hesitant about the bailout; nonetheless, CEO James Cayne and other senior executives worried about the damage to the company's reputation. The funds were invested in thinly traded collateralized debt obligations (CDOs). Merrill Lynch seized $850 million worth of the underlying collateral but only was able to auction $100 million of them. The incident sparked concern of contagion as Bear Stearns might be forced to liquidate its CDOs, prompting a mark-down of similar assets in other portfolios. Richard A. Marin, a senior executive at Bear Stearns Asset Management responsible for the two hedge funds, was replaced on June 29 by Jeffrey B. Lane, a former vice chairman of rival investment bank Lehman Brothers.

During the week of July 16, 2007, Bear Stearns disclosed that the two subprime hedge funds had lost nearly all of their value amid a rapid decline in the market for subprime mortgages. On August 1, 2007, investors in the two funds took action against Bear Stearns and its top board and risk management managers and officers. The law firms of Jake Zamansky & Associates and Rich & Intelisano both filed arbitration claims with the National Association of Securities Dealers alleging that Bear Stearns misled investors about its exposure to the funds. This was the first legal action made against Bear Stearns. Co-President Warren Spector was asked to resign on August 5, 2007, as a result of the collapse of two hedge funds tied to subprime mortgages. A September 21 report in The New York Times noted that Bear Stearns posted a 61 percent drop in net profits due to their hedge fund losses. With Samuel Molinaro's November 15th revelation that Bear Stearns was writing down a further $1.2 billion in mortgage-related securities and would face its first loss in 83 years, Standard & Poor's downgraded the company's credit rating from AA to A.

Matthew Tannin and Ralph R. Cioffi, both former managers of hedge funds at Bear Stearns, were arrested June 19, 2008. They faced criminal charges and were found not guilty of misleading investors about the risks involved in the subprime market. Tannin and Cioffi were also named in lawsuits brought by Barclays Bank, which claimed they were one of the many investors misled by the executives. They were also named in civil lawsuits brought in 2007 by investors, including Barclays, who claimed they had been misled. Barclays claimed that Bear Stearns knew that certain assets in the Bear Stearns High-Grade Structured Credit Strategies Enhanced Leverage Master Fund were worth much less than their professed values. The suit claimed that Bear Stearns managers devised "a plan to make more money for themselves and further to use the Enhanced Fund as a repository for risky, poor-quality investments". The lawsuit said Bear Stearns told Barclays that the enhanced fund was up almost 6% through June 2007—when "in reality, the portfolio's asset values were plummeting."

=== Fed bailout and sale to JPMorgan Chase ===
On March 14, 2008, the Federal Reserve Bank of New York (FRBNY) agreed to provide a $25 billion loan to Bear Stearns collateralized by unencumbered assets from Bear Stearns in order to provide Bear Stearns the liquidity for up to 28 days that the market was refusing to provide. Shortly thereafter, FRBNY had a change of heart and told Bear Stearns that the 28-day loan was unavailable to them. The deal was then changed to where FRBNY would create a company (what would become Maiden Lane LLC) to buy $30 billion worth of Bear Stearns' assets, and Bear Stearns would be purchased by JPMorgan Chase in a stock swap worth $2 a share, or less than 7 percent of Bear Stearns' market value just two days before. This sale price represented a staggering loss as its stock had traded at $172 a share as late as January 2007, and $93 a share as late as February 2008. Eventually, after renegotiating the purchase of Bear Stearns, Maiden Lane LLC was funded by a $29 billion first priority loan from FRBNY and a $1 billion subordinated loan from JPMorgan Chase, without further recourse to JPMorgan Chase. The structure of the transaction, with both loans collateralized by securitized home mortgages and with the JPMorgan Chase loan bearing losses before the FRBNY loan, meant that FRBNY could not seize or otherwise encumber JPMorgan Chase's assets if the underlying collateral became insufficient to repay the FRBNY loan. Federal Reserve Chairman Ben Bernanke defended the bailout by stating that a bankruptcy of Bear Stearns would have affected the real economy and could have caused a "chaotic unwinding" of investments across US markets.

On March 20, SEC Chairman Christopher Cox said the collapse of Bear Stearns was due to a lack of confidence, not a lack of capital. Cox noted that Bear Stearns' problems escalated when rumors spread about its liquidity crisis which in turn eroded investor confidence in the firm. "Notwithstanding that Bear Stearns continued to have high quality collateral to provide as security for borrowings, market counterparties became less willing to enter into collateralized funding arrangements with Bear Stearns", said Cox. Bear Stearns' liquidity pool started at $18.1 billion on March 10 and then plummeted to $2 billion on March 13. Ultimately market rumors about Bear Stearns' difficulties became self-fulfilling, Cox said.

On March 24, 2008, a class action suit was filed on behalf of shareholders, challenging the terms of JPMorgan's acquisition of Bear Stearns. That same day, a new agreement was reached that raised JPMorgan Chase's offer to $10 a share, up from the initial $2 offer, which meant an offer of $1.2 billion. The revised deal was aimed to quiet upset investors and was necessitated by what was characterized as a loophole in a guarantee that was open-ended, despite the fact that the deal required shareholder approval. While it was not clear if JPMorgan's lawyers, Wachtell, Lipton, Rosen & Katz, were to blame for the mistake in the hastily written contract, JPMorgan's CEO, Jamie Dimon, was described as being "apoplectic" about the mistake. The Bear Stearns bailout was seen as an extreme-case scenario, and continues to raise significant questions about Fed intervention. On April 8, 2008, former Fed chairman Paul Volcker stated that the Fed had taken actions that "extend to the very edge of its lawful and implied powers." See his remarks at a luncheon of the Economic Club of New York. On May 29, Bear Stearns shareholders approved the sale to JPMorgan Chase at the $10-per-share price.

An article by journalist Matt Taibbi for Rolling Stone contended that naked short selling had a role in the demise of both Bear Stearns and Lehman Brothers. A study by finance researchers at the University of Oklahoma Price College of Business studied trading in financial stocks, including Bear Stearns and Lehman Brothers, and found "no evidence that stock price declines were caused by naked short selling." Time magazine also labelled former Bear Sterns head James Cayne as the CEO most responsible out of all the CEOs who "screwed up Wall Street" during the 2008 financial crisis, even reporting that "none seemed more asleep at the switch than Bear Stearns' Cayne."

== Structure prior to collapse ==
=== Managing partners/chief executive officers ===
- Salim L. Lewis: 1949–1978
- Alan C. Greenberg: 1978–1993
- James Cayne: 1993–2008
- Alan Schwartz: 2008

=== Major shareholders ===
The largest Bear Stearns shareholders as of December 2007 were:

- Barrow Hanley Mewhinney & Strauss – 9.73%
- Joseph C. Lewis – 9.36%
- Morgan Stanley – 5.37%
- James Cayne – 4.94%
- Legg Mason Capital Management – 4.84%
- Private Capital Management – 4.49%
- Barclays Global Investors – 3.10%
- State Street Global Advisors – 3.01%
- The Vanguard Group – 2.67%
- Janus Capital Management – 2.34%

== See also ==
- Bankruptcy of Lehman Brothers
- Irving Place Capital
- Primary dealer
