= Marc Zamansky =

French mathematician

Marc Zamansky (Genève 14 February 1916 - 6 November 1996) was a French mathematician and a member of the French Resistance.
