= Jake Zamansky (lawyer) =

American securities arbitration attorney

Jacob (Jake) H. Zamansky is an American securities arbitration attorney.

== Career ==
Zamansky worked for the Federal Trade Commission as a federal prosecutor, and at the firm Skadden, Arps, Slate, Meagher & Flom. In June 2001, Zamansky won a securities arbitration case against Wall Street firm Merrill Lynch and stock analyst Henry Blodget and received a $400,000 settlement.

In late 2006, Zamansky filed a case against a Long Island-based financial adviser alleging the defendant's clients were the victims of predatory lending. Zamansky has represented securities professionals involved in employment disputes and been involved in Termination Form U-5 defamation cases. Zamansky has opposed the court ruling, (Rosenberg v. Metlife) which provides brokerage firm's with "absolute privilege" regarding what they write on a Form U-5.
