= James Cayne =

American businessman (1934–2021)

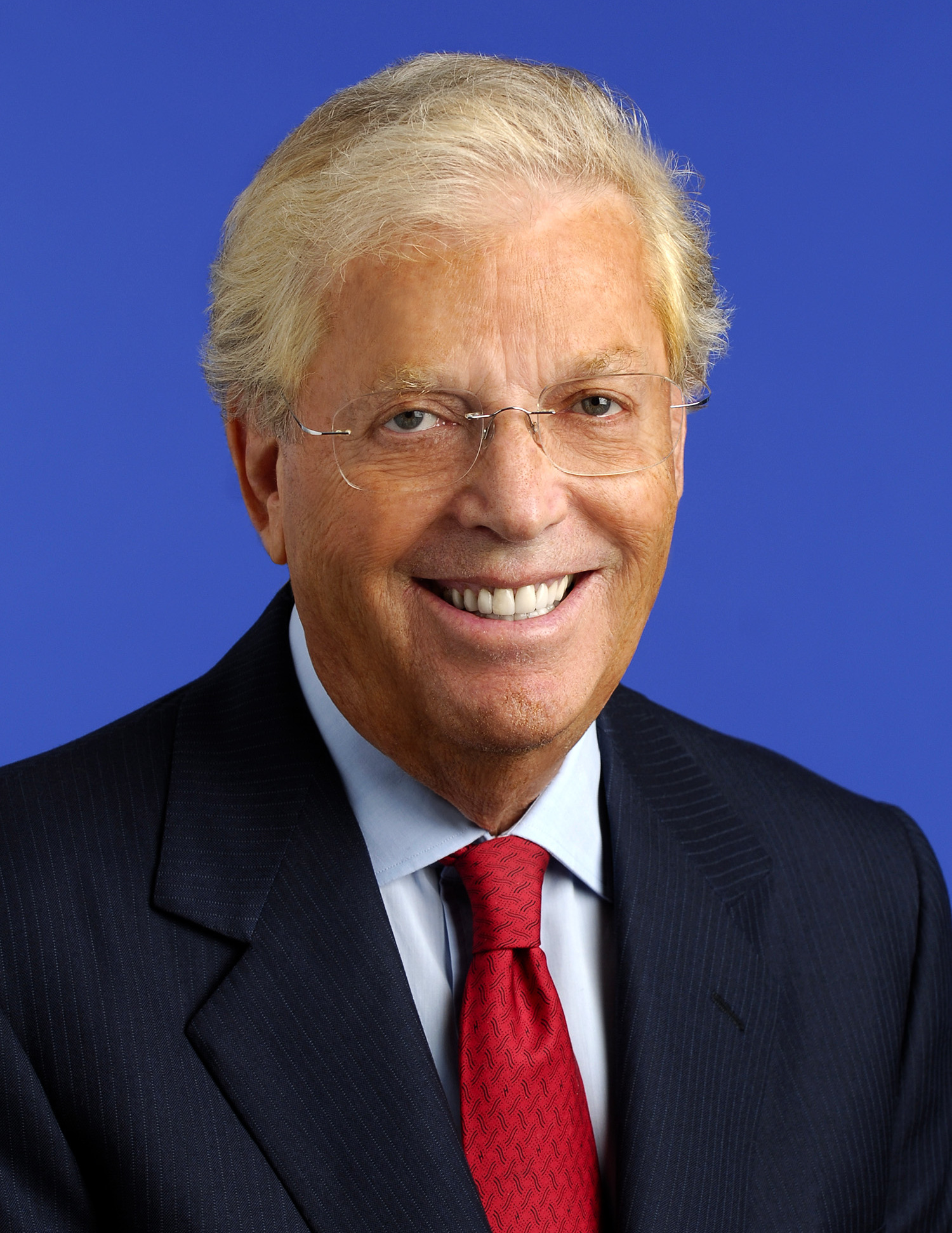
- Cayne in 2007
- Born: February 14, 1934; Evanston, Illinois, U.S.
- Died: December 28, 2021 (aged 87); Long Branch, New Jersey, U.S.
- Education: Purdue University
- Occupation: Businessman
- Known for: CEO of Bear Stearns
- Spouse: Patricia Denner
- Children: 2
- Family: Richard C. Perry (nephew)

James E. "Jimmy" Cayne (February 14, 1934 – December 28, 2021) was an American businessman and CEO of Bear Stearns. In 2006, he became the first Wall Street chief to own a company stake worth more than $1 billion, but he lost most of that in the 2007–2008 collapse of Bear's stock and sold his entire stake in the company for $61 million.

== Early life and career ==
Cayne was born and raised in Evanston, Illinois, the son of Jean and Maurice Cayne, a patent attorney. Cayne attended Purdue University, but left before graduating to join the United States Army. Cayne was a member of Kappa Beta Phi.

His first job was as a traveling salesman; he then sold scrap iron and municipal bonds. In 1969 he was playing bridge full-time in New York City when Alan C. Greenberg, then a relative novice at the bridge table, hired him as a stockbroker at Bear Stearns. Cayne became president in 1985, CEO in 1993, and chairman of the board (while continuing as CEO) in 2001. He was replaced as CEO only in 2008 and he was with the company until its demise.

=== Wealth ===
In 2005, Forbes magazine ranked him 384th among the 400 richest Americans, with an estimated net worth of $900 million. By 2008 Cayne had lost nearly 95% of his fortune as a result of the collapse of Bear Stearns.

Cayne has been the subject of various press reports since the Bear collapse, including the fact that he sold his stake in the company for $61 million after its crash. On March 14, 2008, Charlie Gasparino of CNBC reported that the value of Cayne's holdings in Bear Stearns had declined from $997 million to significantly less than $200 million in the wake of Bear Stearns' liquidity crisis. Just days later, Bear Stearns came to an agreement with competitor JP Morgan for a full buyout at only $2 per share, or roughly $236 million for the entire firm. At the time, Cayne had significant exposure to the company's stock, with most of his net worth tied up in shares of the company. It is estimated that the value of Cayne's holdings had dropped to less than $15 million as a result, effectively removing him from the list of the wealthiest individuals in the country. On March 27, 2008, it was announced that Cayne sold his entire stake in Bear Stearns, over 5.61 million shares, for $10.82 a share. This stake was sold prior to the vote on the renewed bid by JP Morgan for Bear Stearns.

In February 2009, Cayne was named in Time Magazine's list of "25 People to Blame for the Financial Crisis." In addition to being named on this list, Time also alleged that of all the CEOs during the crisis, "none seemed more asleep at the switch" than Cayne.

== Personal life and death ==
Cayne had one child from his first marriage, Jennice Cayne Nienkerk, who has two daughters. In 1971, Cayne married his second wife, Patricia Denner. They had one child, Alison Cayne Schneider. Alison is divorced from hedge fund manager Jack Schneider with whom she has five children. He was uncle to hedge fund investor Richard Cayne Perry.

Cayne was rumored to be a regular marijuana smoker, though he denied the allegations.

Cayne died on December 28, 2021, at the age of 87, at a hospital in Long Branch, New Jersey, from complications of a stroke.

In 2025, a copy of Jeffrey Epstein's birthday book from 2003 was released, which included a note from Cayne. The New York Times described him and Epstein as having a "close relationship".

=== Bridge ===
Cayne, himself a sound bridge player, recruited international-class professionals to form teams that have won more than a dozen North American championships. For example, he hired one American and four Italian world champions to win the Reisinger Board-a-Match Teams in November 2011, his sixth win in that teams-of-four competition. His bridge career as a sponsor and player has resulted in attaining the ranks of ACBL Grand Life Master and World Bridge Federation World Master. In the biennial Bermuda Bowl world championship teams, his 1995 team USA1—one of two that represented the United States, a unique status—finished ninth (the lowest U.S. finish in the sixty-year history of the event), while Team USA2 placed first. In March 2002, The New York Daily Sun announced that Cayne would be contributing a bridge column.

Wins

North American Bridge Championships (17)

- Spingold (3) 1989, 1990, 2015
- Reisinger (6) 1977, 1988, 1992, 2007, 2010, 2011
- Grand National Teams (1) 1994
- Open Board-a-Match Teams (1) 2011
- Men's Board-a-Match Teams (2) 1969, 1988
- Jacoby Open Swiss Teams (2) 1996, 2005
- Master Mixed Teams (1) 1966
- Life Master Men's Pairs (1) 1969

United States Bridge Championships (1)

- Open Team Trials (1) 1995

Other notable wins:

- Maccabiah Games (1) 1981
- Cavendish Invitational Teams (1) 1986
- Cavendish Invitational Pairs (1) 1982
- Goldman Pairs (1) 1968

Runners up

- Olympiad Mixed Teams (1) 1974
- World Mixed Pairs (1) 1974

North American Bridge Championships (15)

- Vanderbilt (3) 1983, 1997, 1998
- Spingold (3) 1994, 1997, 2006
- Reisinger (4) 1981, 1993, 1994, 1996
- Open Board-a-Match Teams (1) 1995
- Men's Board-a-Match Teams (1) 1989
- Mixed Board-a-Match Teams (1) 1996
- Life Master Pairs (2) 1969, 1973

United States Bridge Championships (1)

- Open Team Trials (1) 1998

Other notable second places:

- Now! Invitational Pairs (1) 1981
- Cavendish Invitational Pairs (1) 1976
