= History of Grand Central Terminal =

History of a New York City commuter rail station

Coordinates: 40°45′10″N 73°58′38″W

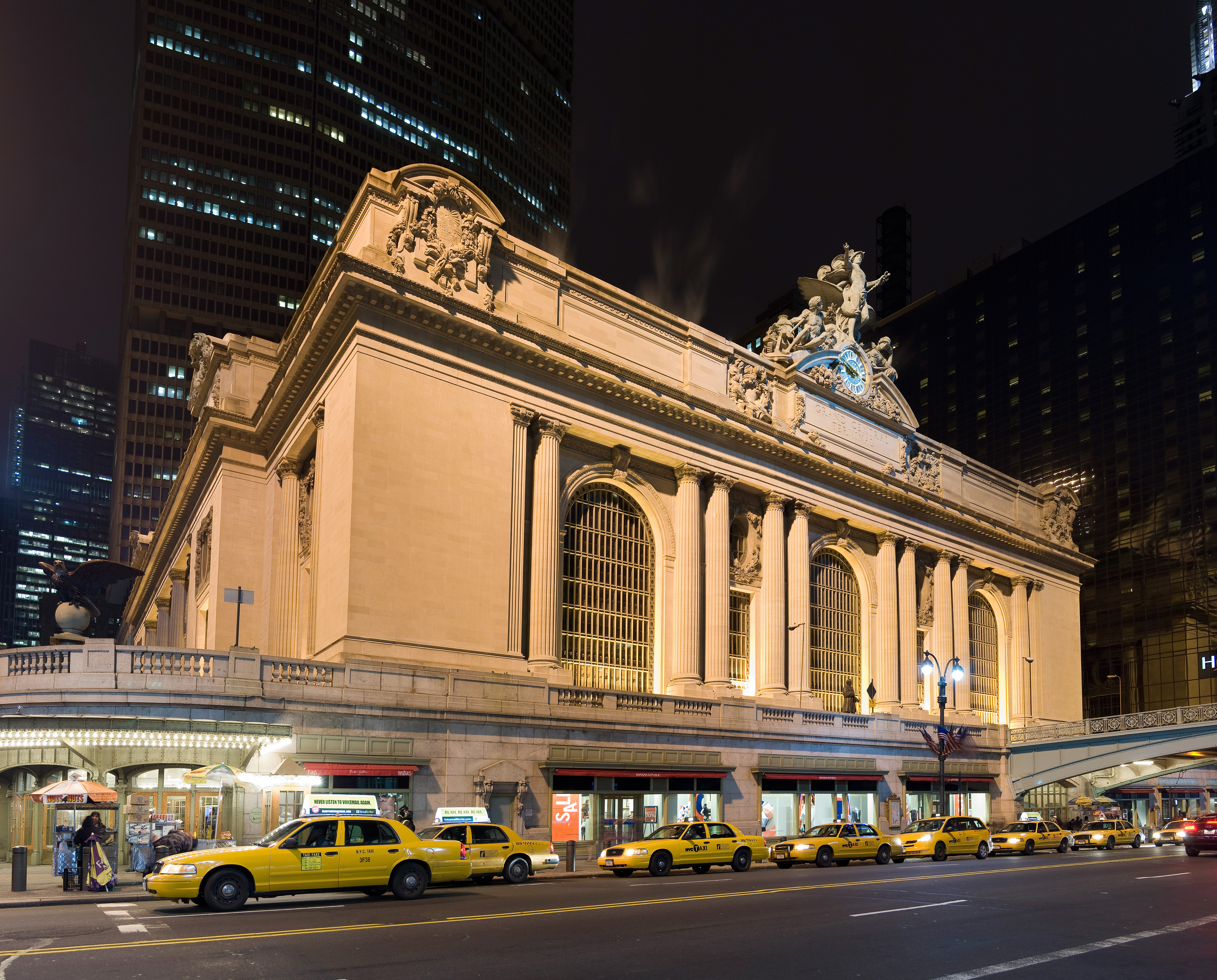
42nd Street exterior at night

Grand Central Terminal is a major commuter rail terminal in Midtown Manhattan, New York City, serving the Metro-North Railroad's Harlem, Hudson and New Haven Lines, and the Long Island Rail Road (LIRR). It is the most recent of three functionally similar buildings on the same site. The current structure was built by and named for the New York Central & Hudson River Railroad, though it also served the New York, New Haven and Hartford Railroad. Passenger service has continued under the successors of the New York Central and New Haven railroads.

Grand Central Terminal arose from a need to build a central station for three railroads in present-day Midtown Manhattan. In 1871, the magnate Cornelius "Commodore" Vanderbilt created Grand Central Depot for the New York Central & Hudson River, New York and Harlem Railroad, and New Haven railroads. Due to rapid growth, the depot was reconstructed and renamed Grand Central Station by 1900. The current structure, designed by the firms Reed and Stem and Warren and Wetmore, was built after a 1902 crash between two steam trains had prompted a study of the feasibility of electric trains. The building's construction started in 1903 and it was opened on February 2, 1913.

The terminal continued to grow until after World War II, when train traffic started to decline. In the 1950s and 1970s, there were two separate proposals to demolish Grand Central, though both were unsuccessful. The terminal was given several official landmark designations during this period. Minor improvements occurred through the 1970s and 1980s, followed by an extensive rehabilitation in the mid- and late 1990s.

From 1913 to 1991, Grand Central was also a major intercity terminal. In its latter years as an intercity station, all trains traveling along Amtrak's Empire Corridor—the former main line of the New York Central—originated and terminated at Grand Central. In 1991, Amtrak consolidated its New York City services at nearby Penn Station. The East Side Access project, which brought LIRR service to a new station beneath the terminal, was completed in January 2023.

== Background ==
Grand Central Terminal arose from a need to build a central station for the Hudson River Railroad, the New York and Harlem Railroad, and the New York and New Haven Railroad in what is now Midtown Manhattan. The Harlem Railroad was the first of these railroads to operate, having been incorporated in 1831. The railroad had been extended to Harlem, in upper Manhattan, by 1837. The first railroad structure of any kind on the modern-day site of Grand Central Terminal was a maintenance shed for the Harlem Railroad, built c. 1837 on the west side of Fourth Avenue between 42nd and 43rd streets.

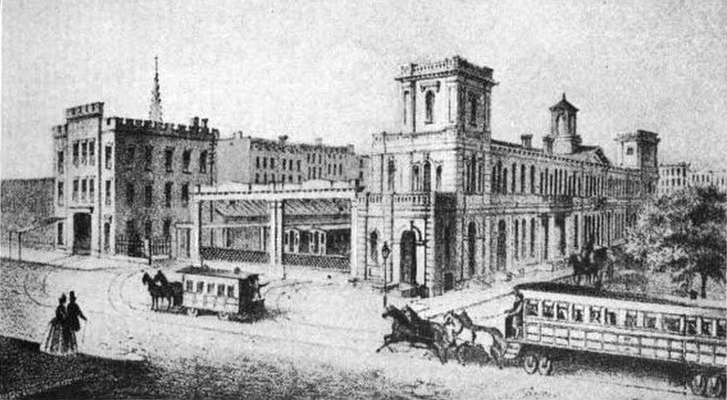
26th Street terminal in Manhattan, 1857

Since the Harlem Railroad had the exclusive right to operate along the east side of Manhattan south of the Harlem River, it originally ran as a steam railroad on street level along Fourth (now Park) Avenue. After the passage of laws prohibiting steam trains in Lower Manhattan, the railroad's southern terminal was moved northward from 14th Street in Union Square to 26th Street near Madison Square. In 1857, the New Haven Railroad built a terminal adjacent to the Harlem Railroad's; their rail lines turned into a rail yard shared by both terminals, which was the beginning of the idea of a central terminal, shared by different rail companies. The building was later converted into the first Madison Square Garden.

The New Haven Railroad was chartered in 1849 and had trackage rights to operate on the Harlem Railroad's tracks from Wakefield, Bronx, to Manhattan. The Hudson River Railroad did not have any trackage rights with the Harlem Railroad, so it ran in Manhattan separately along what would become the West Side Line, terminating at Tenth Avenue and 30th Street in what is now Hudson Yards. When the city banned steam trains below 42nd Street c. 1857–1858, the Harlem and New Haven Railroads' southern terminal was moved there. The Hudson River Railroad, meanwhile, was limited to the west side of Manhattan, away from the development that was concentrated on the east side.

The business magnate Cornelius Vanderbilt, who operated steamboats along the Hudson River, started buying the Harlem Railroad's stock in 1863. By the next year, he also controlled the Hudson River Railroad. Vanderbilt attempted to get permission to merge the railroads in 1864, but Daniel Drew, a one-time competitor in the steamboat industry, bribed state legislators to scuttle the proposal. Drew unsuccessfully attempted to short-sell Harlem and New York Central stock, and Vanderbilt made large profits after buying stock in both companies. Vanderbilt became the president of the Hudson River and New York Central railroads in 1867, and merged them into the New York Central & Hudson River Railroad two years later, on November 1, 1869. He then built a connecting line along the Harlem River's northern and eastern bank, running from the Hudson River Railroad in Spuyten Duyvil, Bronx, to the junction with the Harlem Railroad in Mott Haven, Bronx, as part of the Spuyten Duyvil and Port Morris Railroad.

Concurrently, the Harlem Railroad expanded in the area around the 42nd Street depot, which at the time was still sparsely developed. By the mid-1860s, the railroad owned 11 parcels bounded by 42nd and 48th streets on either side of Fourth Avenue, between Lexington Avenue and Madison Avenue. The structures on these parcels included two locomotive sheds, a car house, and a stable and horseshoeing shop for the horses that pulled Harlem Railroad carriages from 42nd Street to Madison Square.

Vanderbilt developed a proposal to unite the three railroads at a single central station, replacing the separate and adjacent stations that created chaos in baggage transfer. The three lines would meet at Mott Haven, then run on the Harlem Railroad's tracks along Park Avenue in Manhattan to a new hub station at 42nd Street.

== Grand Central Depot ==
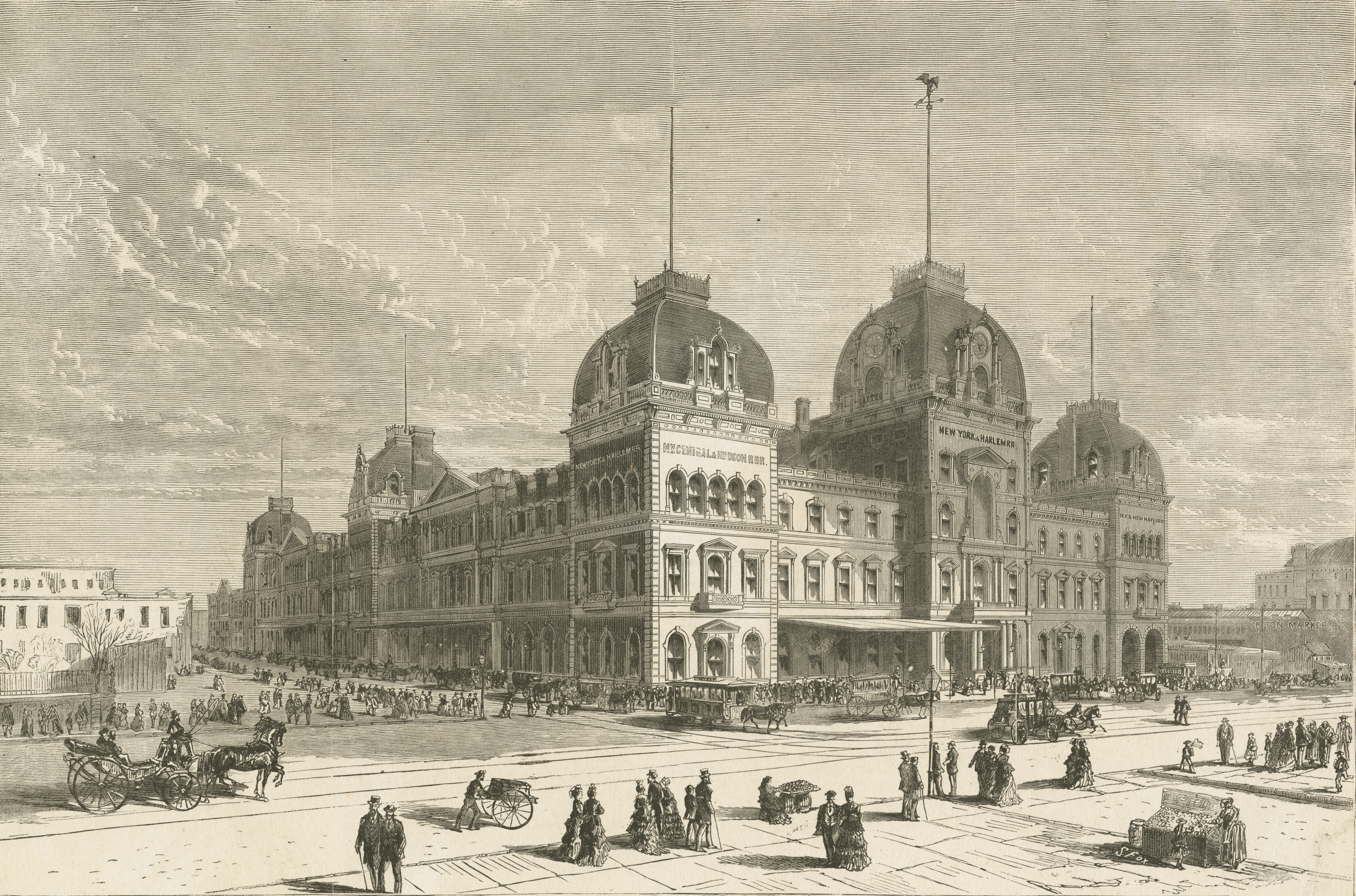
Grand Central Depot

By 1869, Vanderbilt had commissioned John B. Snook to design his new station, dubbed Grand Central Depot, on the site of the 42nd Street depot. The site was far outside the limits of the developed city at the time, and even Vanderbilt's backers warned against building the terminal in such an undeveloped area. Snook worked with engineers Isaac Buckhout and R.G. Buckfield to design the structure. Its train shed was designed by either Joseph Duclos or R. G. Hatfield, both of whom were employed by the fabricators, the Architectural Iron Works. Although Vanderbilt was inspired by French Classical architecture, Snook's final design was in the Second Empire style. Its design, materials, and convenience rivaled European train stations; it was considered the first in the U.S. to measure up to those in Europe.

Construction started on September 1, 1869, and the depot was completed by October 1871. The project included the creation of Vanderbilt Avenue, a service road along the depot's western border. To reduce confusion, the railroads staggered their inaugural runs to the new station. The Harlem Railroad switched from its Madison Square depot on October 9, 1871; the New Haven Railroad arrived on October 16; and the New York Central & Hudson River Railroad on November 1, eight days later than planned.

=== Structure ===
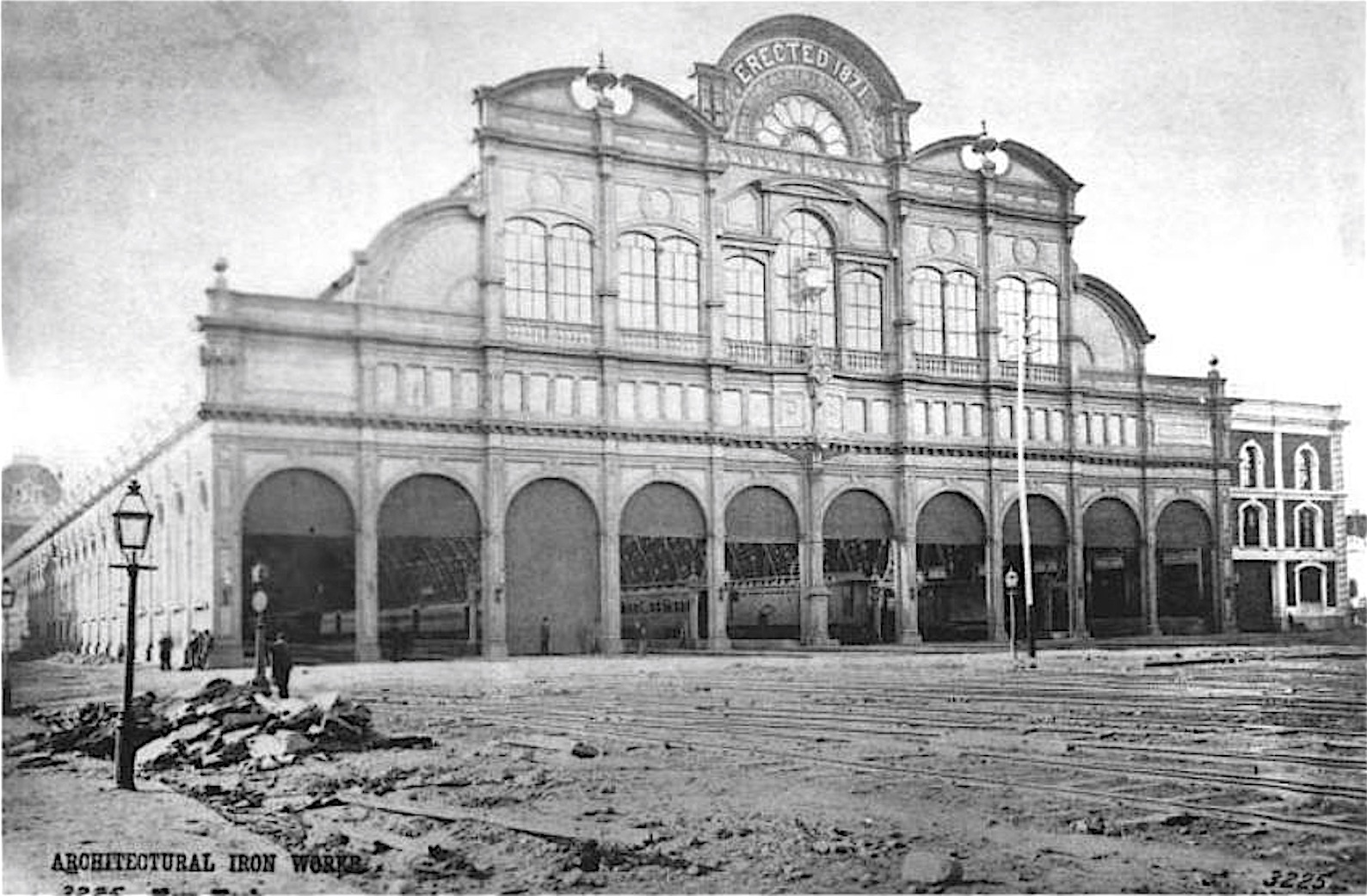
The depot and station's train shed

The terminal consisted of a three-story head house as well as a train shed to the north and east of the head house. The head house was an L-shaped structure with a short leg running east–west on 42nd Street and a long leg running north–south on Vanderbilt Avenue. It contained passenger service areas at ground level and railroad offices on the upper levels. The train shed was a generally cylindrical-shaped glass structure about 530 feet (160 m) long by 200 feet (61 m) wide, with a height of 100 feet (30 m) at the crown. The train shed's roof was composed of thirty-two trusses that arched above the platforms. There were three waiting rooms, one for each of the three railroads, and a metal-and-glass screen with metal doors closed off the north end of the station. The structure measured 695 feet (212 m) along Vanderbilt Avenue and 530 feet (160 m) along 42nd Street. It was considered the largest railroad station in the world, with 12 tracks that could accommodate 150 train cars at once. It also had the largest interior space in North America. The storage yard stretched north to 58th Street, and the New York Central employed several switchers to shunt empty passenger cars to and from the storage sidings.

Grand Central Depot contained three innovative features of note: high-level platforms, level with train cars' floors; a balloon roof for the train shed, enabling a clear span over the tracks; and inspectors who allowed only ticketed passengers on the platforms. There were four restaurants, a billiards room, stores, and a police station. Its design was similar to that of other major railroad stations, such as St Pancras station in London and Gare du Nord and Gare de Lyon in Paris. In particular, Snook took inspiration for the train shed's roof from St Pancras and London's Crystal Palace, as well as from the Louvre museum in Paris.

=== Later modifications ===
The tracks laid to the new terminal proved problematic. Accidents began immediately at the grade crossings along Fourth Avenue from 42nd and 59th streets; seven people died within 12 days of the New York Central & Hudson River Railroad's move to Grand Central. The following year, in 1872, Vanderbilt proposed the Fourth Avenue Improvement Project. The tracks between 48th and 56th streets were to be moved into a shallow open cut, while the segment between 56th and 97th streets, which was in a rock cut, would be covered over. (Note: The line entered fully enclosed brick tunnels between 67th and 71st streets, and between 80th and 96th streets. The remainder of this segment was located in a "beam tunnel" structure, which were mostly open-air, except where cross-streets traversed the cut on steel-beam bridges.) The improvements were completed in 1874, allowing trains approaching Grand Central Depot from the north to descend into the Park Avenue Tunnel at 96th Street and continue underground into the new depot. As part of the project, Fourth Avenue was transformed into a boulevard with a median strip that covered the railroad's ventilation grates, and renamed Park Avenue. Eight footbridges crossed the tracks between 45th and 56th streets; vehicles crossed on overpasses at 45th and 48th streets.

Traffic at Grand Central Depot grew quickly, filling its 12 tracks to capacity by the mid-1880s, not the late 1890s or early 1900s as expected. In 1885, a seven-track annex with five platforms was added to the east side of the existing terminal. Designed in the same style as the original station, with a 90-foot-high (27 m) mansard roof, it handled passengers disembarking to New York City, while the original building handled outbound traffic. If the annex had been a standalone station, it would have been the country's fourth-largest at the time, The New York Sun wrote just before it opened. The project included the construction of Depew Place, a marginal road on the east side of the annex named for longtime Vanderbilt lawyer Chauncey Depew and meant to complement Vanderbilt Avenue on the station's west side. The train yards were also expanded, and various maintenance sheds were moved to Mott Haven.

== Grand Central Station ==
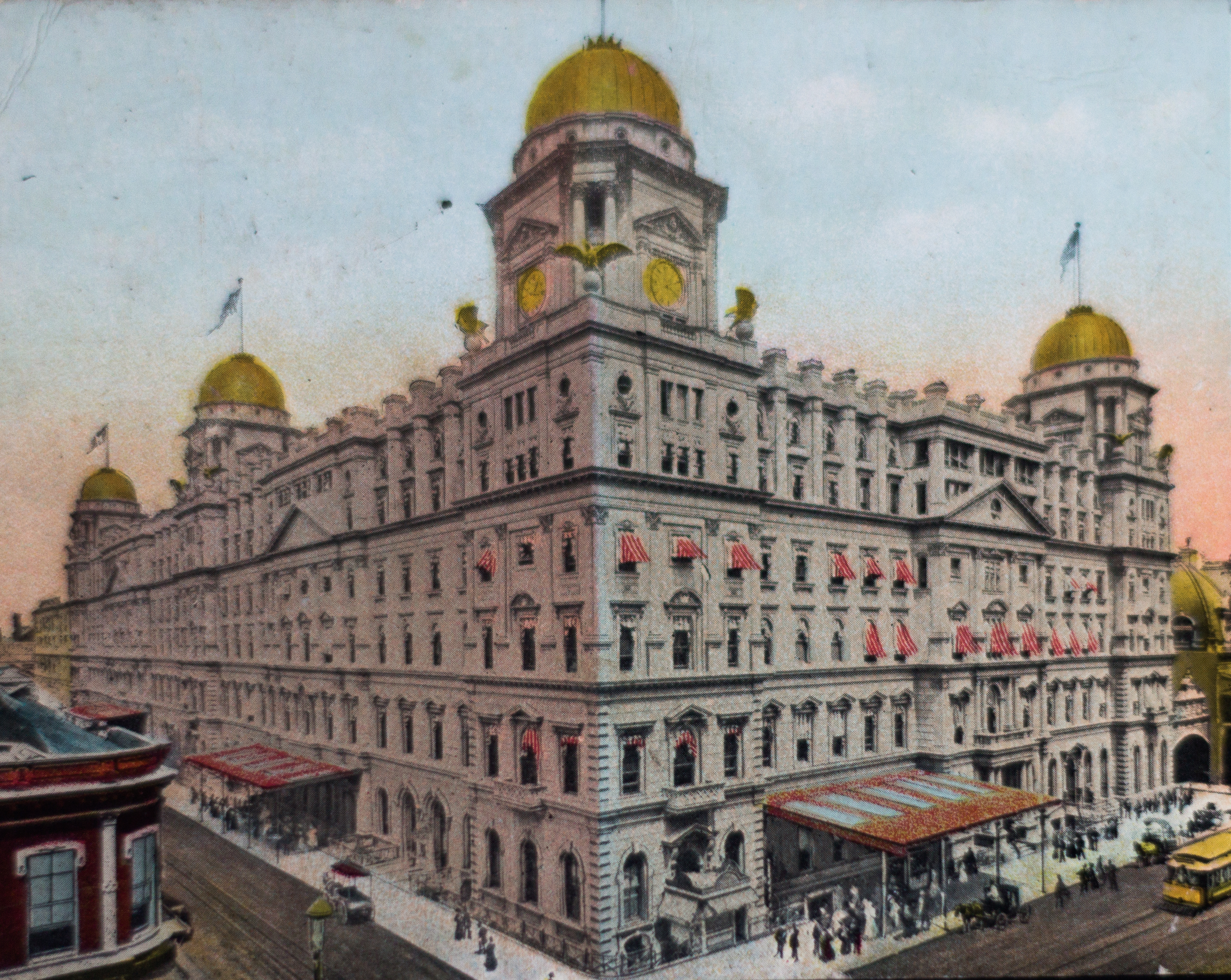
Grand Central Station, c. 1902

Grand Central Depot reached its capacity again by 1897, when it saw 11.5 million passengers a year. To accommodate the crowds, the railroads expanded the head house from three to six stories, enlarged the concourse at a cost of $2.5 million to connect the three railroads' separate waiting rooms, and increased the combined areas of the waiting rooms from 12,000 to 28,000 square feet (1,100 to 2,600 m^{2}). Foyers were added to the west, south, and east sides of the station; women's waiting rooms, smoking rooms, and restrooms were also added. The tracks that previously continued south of 42nd Street were removed. The train yard was reconfigured and a pneumatic switch system was added in an effort to reduce congestion and turn-around time for trains. Finally, the renovation added a new facade in the Neo-Renaissance style, based on plans by railroad architect Bradford Gilbert.

The reconstructed building was renamed Grand Central Station. The new waiting room, located between 42nd Street and the concourse, opened in October 1900. By this time, Grand Central had lost its impression of grandeur, and there was much criticism of the station's filthiness. In 1899, The New York Times published an editorial that began, "Nothing except the New York City government has been so discreditable to it as its principal railroad station […] at 42nd Street." The architect Samuel Huckel Jr. was commissioned to make further modifications to the terminal's interior. A nearby post office was also proposed to ease mail handling.

=== Park Avenue Tunnel crash and aftermath ===
As train traffic increased in the late 1890s and early 1900s, so did the problems of smoke and soot produced by steam locomotives in the Park Avenue Tunnel, the only approach to the station. In 1899, William J. Wilgus, the New York Central's chief engineer, proposed electrifying the lines leading to the station, using a third rail power system devised by Frank J. Sprague. Railroad executives approved the plan, but shelved it as too expensive.

On January 8, 1902, a southbound train overran signals in the smoky Park Avenue Tunnel and collided with another southbound train, killing 15 people and injuring more than 30 others. A week later, New York Central president William H. Newman announced that all of the railroad's suburban lines to Grand Central would be electrified, and the approach to the station would be put underground. The New York State Legislature subsequently passed a law to ban all steam trains in Manhattan beginning on July 1, 1908. By December 1902, as part of an agreement with the city, New York Central agreed to put the approach to Grand Central Station from 46th to 59th Streets in an open cut under Park Avenue, and to upgrade the tracks to accommodate electric trains. Overpasses would be built across the open cut at most of the cross-streets.

All this prompted Wilgus—who had become the vice president of New York Central—to write a fateful letter to Newman. Dated December 22, 1902, it argued that the Park Avenue open cut should be electrified because electric trains were cleaner, faster, and cheaper to repair. Electrification would also remove the issue of smoke and soot exhaust; as such, the open cut could be covered over, and the railroad would benefit from enabling new real estate to be built along sixteen blocks of Park Avenue. The tunnel had to be approved soon because the New York City Rapid Transit Commission was planning to give the Interborough Rapid Transit Company (IRT) the right to construct an underground subway route around Grand Central Station, which would preempt New York Central's rights to build underground. Wilgus' letter also proposed replacing the two-year-old station with a new two-level electric train terminal, which would allow a larger yard to be built. The terminal would include balloon loops to allow trains to turn around without changing direction. To offset the costs of construction and of acquiring the expensive new land that would be required—Grand Central proper only covered three blocks—he proposed to superimpose over the terminal a 12-story, 2,300,000-square-foot (210,000 m^{2}) building whose rents would bring in gross annual income of either $1.35 million or $2.3 million.

In March 1903, Wilgus presented a more detailed proposal to the New York Central board, describing a terminal with separate levels for commuter and intercity railroads; a main concourse with ramps to the lower concourse and the IRT subway station; an expansive waiting room; a hotel on Madison Avenue; and a viaduct surrounding the 12-story building above the station building. New York Central also planned to eliminate railroad crossings in the Bronx, as well as straighten out and add tracks to the railroad lines leading to Grand Central, as part of the Grand Central improvement. The railroad's board of directors approved the $35 million project in June 1903; ultimately, almost all of Wilgus's proposal would be implemented.

== Replacement ==
1903 design competition plans

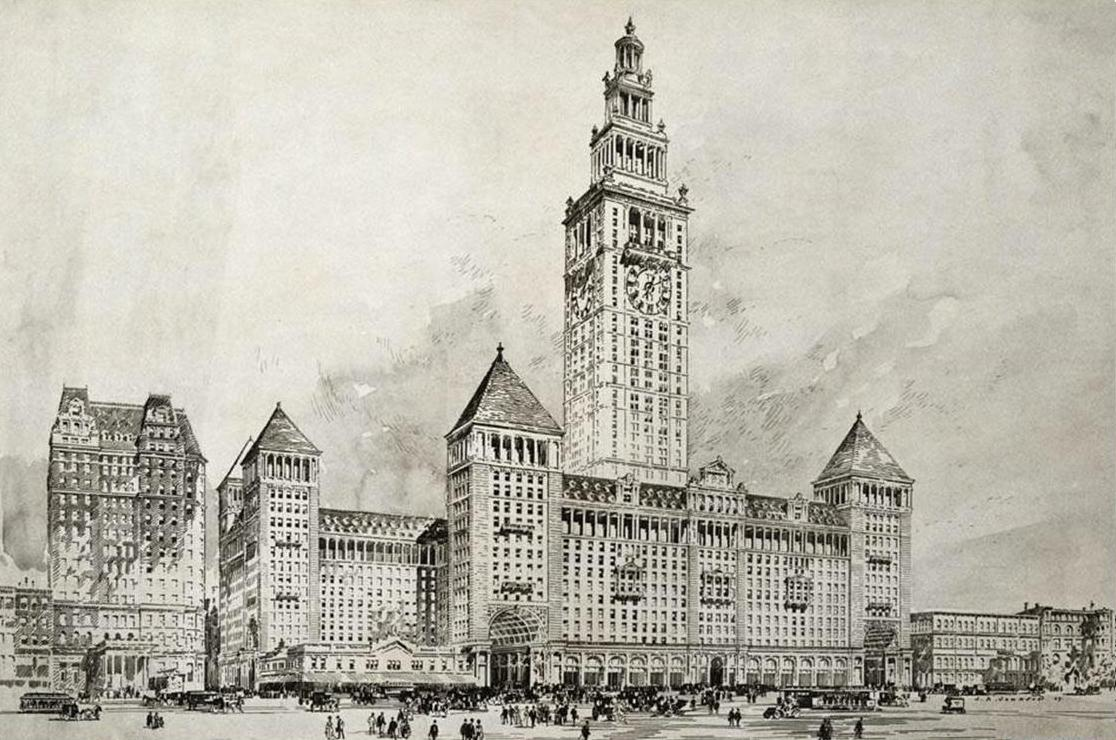
McKim, Mead & White

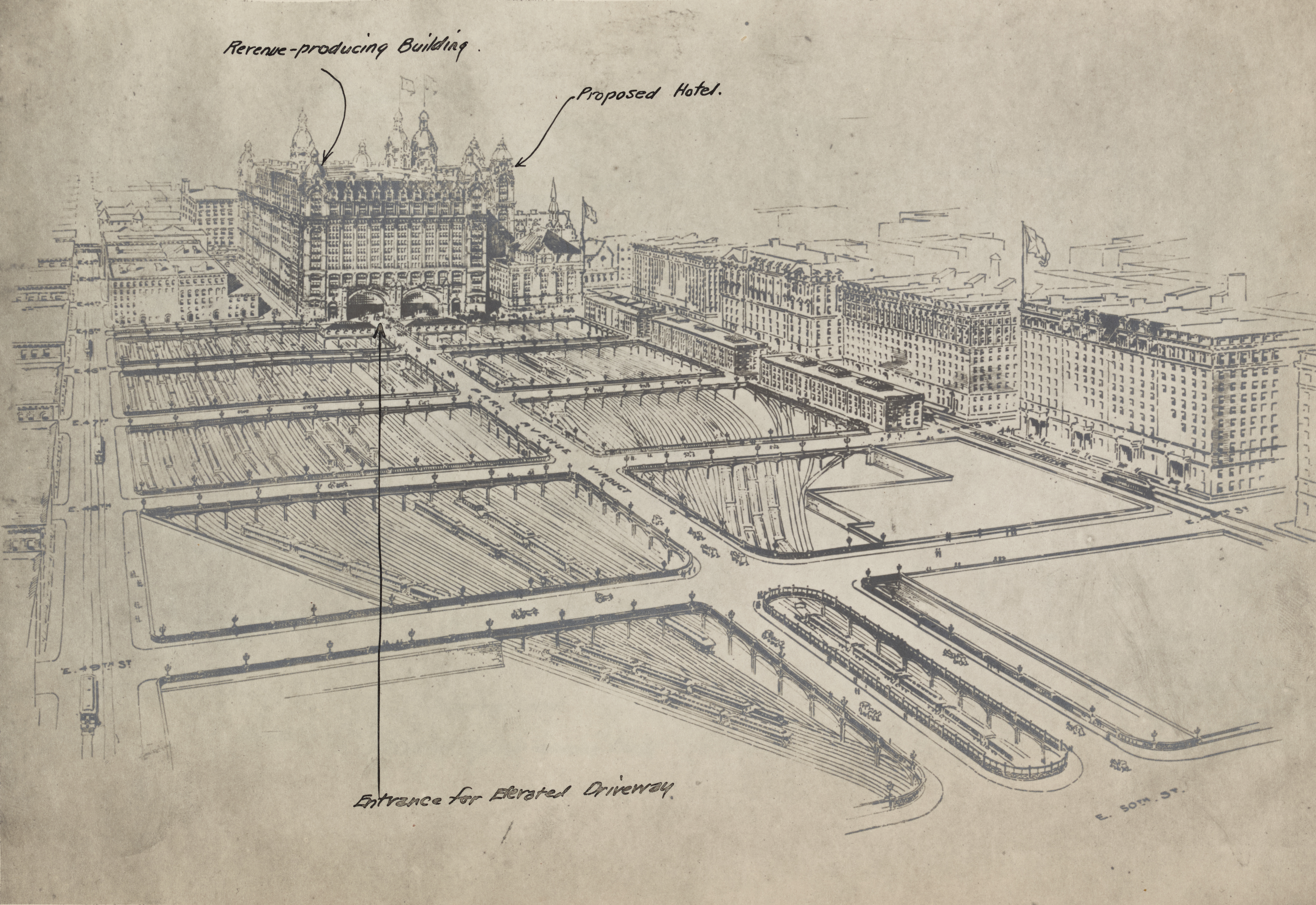
Samuel Huckel Jr.

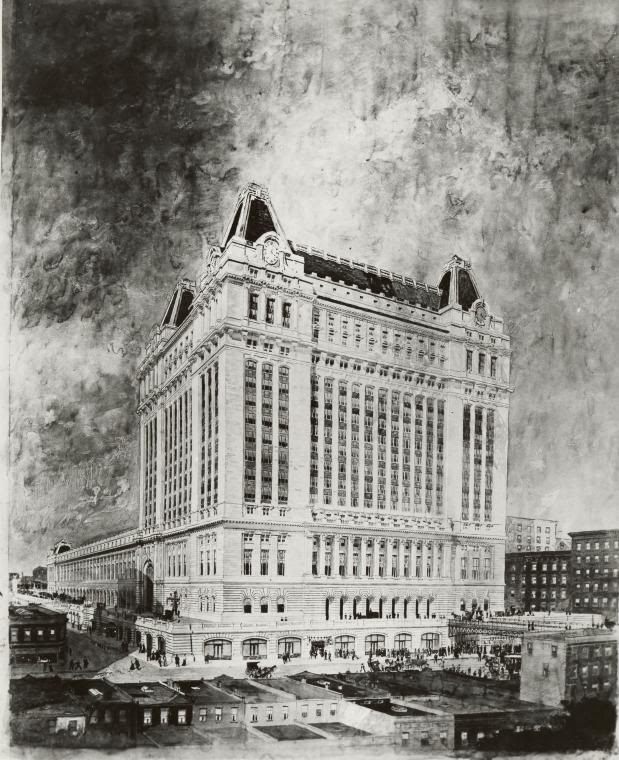
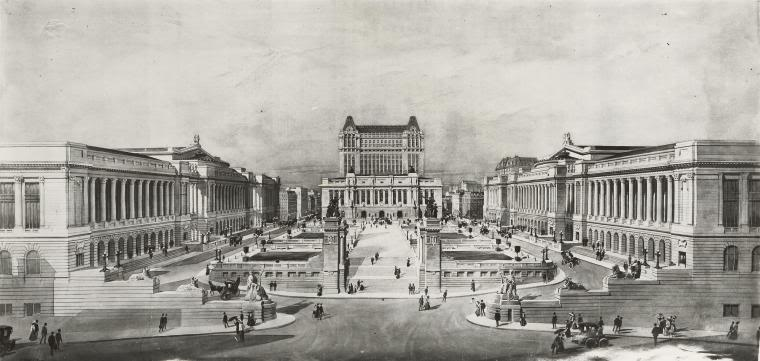
Proposals from Reed and Stem

The entire building was to be torn down in phases and replaced by the current Grand Central Terminal. It was to be the biggest terminal in the world, both in the size of the building and in the number of tracks. The Grand Central Terminal project was divided into eight phases, though the construction of the terminal itself comprised only two of these phases. (Note: The projects included: 1. excavation of Grand Central Yard; 2. construction of Grand Central's station building; 3. electrification of the Harlem, Hudson, and New Haven divisions; 4. lowering the Port Morris Branch tracks in the Bronx; 5. building tunnels along the Hudson Division around the Harlem River Ship Canal in Marble Hill, Manhattan (ultimately never built, as the Harlem River Ship Canal was relocated); 6. eliminating grade crossings; 7. adding tracks on the Harlem and New Haven divisions)

=== Design process ===
The current building was intended to compete with the now-destroyed Pennsylvania Station, a high-end electric-train hub being built on Manhattan's west side for the arch-rival Pennsylvania Railroad by McKim, Mead & White. Wilgus wanted the new Grand Central Terminal's architecture to match the grand design of Penn Station. In 1903, New York Central invited four well-known firms and architects to compete for the job: Daniel H. Burnham; McKim, Mead & White; Reed and Stem; and Samuel Huckel Jr. All four proposed a station topped by a tower, though Huckel did not seem to have participated significantly in the competition. McKim, Mead & White suggested a 60- to 65-story tower with an 18-story base, and space underneath for Park Avenue and 43rd Street to run through the building. Copies of Burnham's proposal no longer exist, but it followed the lines of the City Beautiful movement.

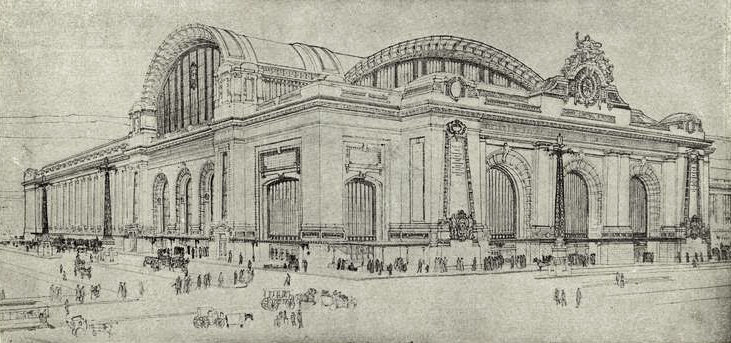
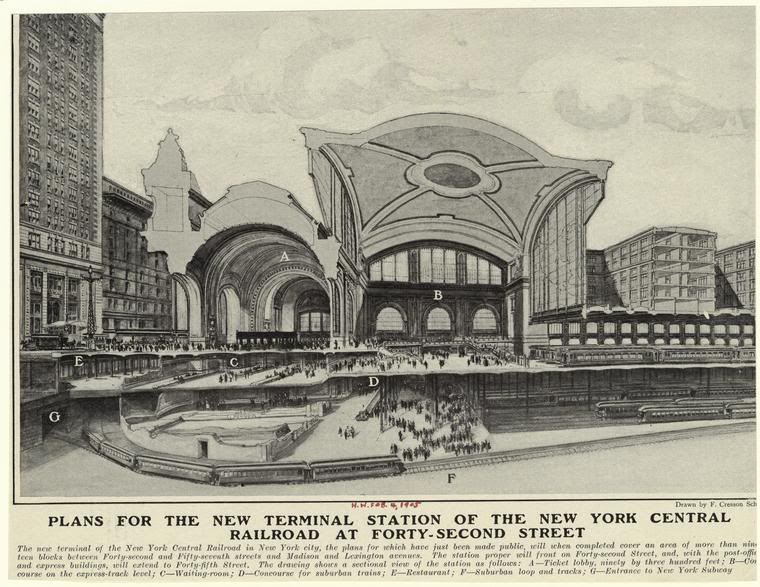
Proposal of the associated architects of Grand Central, 1905

The railroad ultimately chose the design offered by Reed and Stem, experienced railway-station designers who proposed vehicular viaducts around the terminal and ramps between its two-passenger levels. Warren and Wetmore were also selected to co-design the building, The design also incorporated air rights above the tracks, as had Wilgus's original proposal. Nepotism may have played a role in the selection of Reed & Stem—one partner, Charles A. Reed, was Wilgus's brother-in-law, and the official reason for their selection was that Reed & Stem's plan contained "an elevated driveway around the Terminal". Family ties definitely accounted for the decision to hire Warren and Wetmore as co-designers: Cornelius Vanderbilt's grandson William insisted upon employing the firm co-founded by his cousin Whitney Warren. Warren was an alumnus of the École nationale supérieure des Beaux-Arts, which influenced his final design for the building.

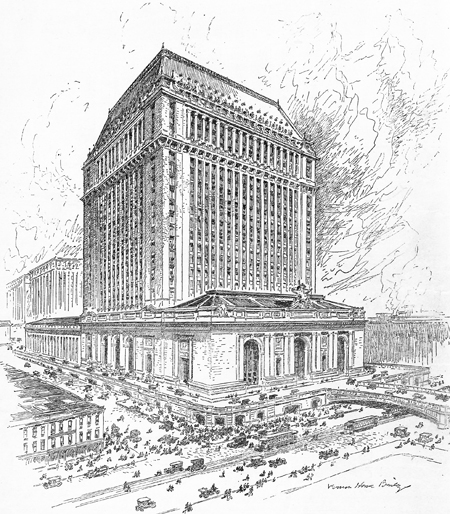
A 1911 proposal for an office building atop Grand Central Terminal

The two firms entered an agreement to act as the associated architects of Grand Central Terminal in February 1904. Reed and Stem were responsible for the overall design of the station, while Warren and Wetmore worked on designing the station's Beaux-Arts exterior. Charles Reed was appointed the chief executive for the collaboration between the two firms, and he promptly appointed Alfred T. Fellheimer as head of the combined design team. New York Central submitted its final proposal for the terminal to the New York City Board of Estimate later that year. The proposed station was massive, containing two track levels, a large main concourse, a post office, several entrances, and a construction footprint spanning 19 blocks.

The design team, called Associated Architects of Grand Central Terminal, had a tense relationship due to constant design disputes. Over Wilgus' objections, Warren and Wetmore removed the 12-story tower and vehicular viaducts that had been part of Reed and Stem's plan. The New Haven Railroad, which bore one-third of the project's cost, also objected to the tower's removal because it would deprive the railroad of revenue, and objected to Warren's elaborate design because it would cost more to build than Wilgus's and Reed and Stem's. The New Haven refused to approve the final design until December 1909, when the two railroads and agreed to include foundations to support a future building above Grand Central Terminal. The elevated viaducts were also restored, as were several of Reed and Stem's other design elements, but Warren's elaborate headhouse design was retained. Reed died in 1911; the day after his funeral, Wetmore and New York Central met secretly. The railroad then entered a contract solely with Warren and Wetmore, who took full credit for the station's design. Allen H. Stem of Reed and Stem subsequently sued Warren and Wetmore, which was ordered to pay restitution after a protracted legal battle.

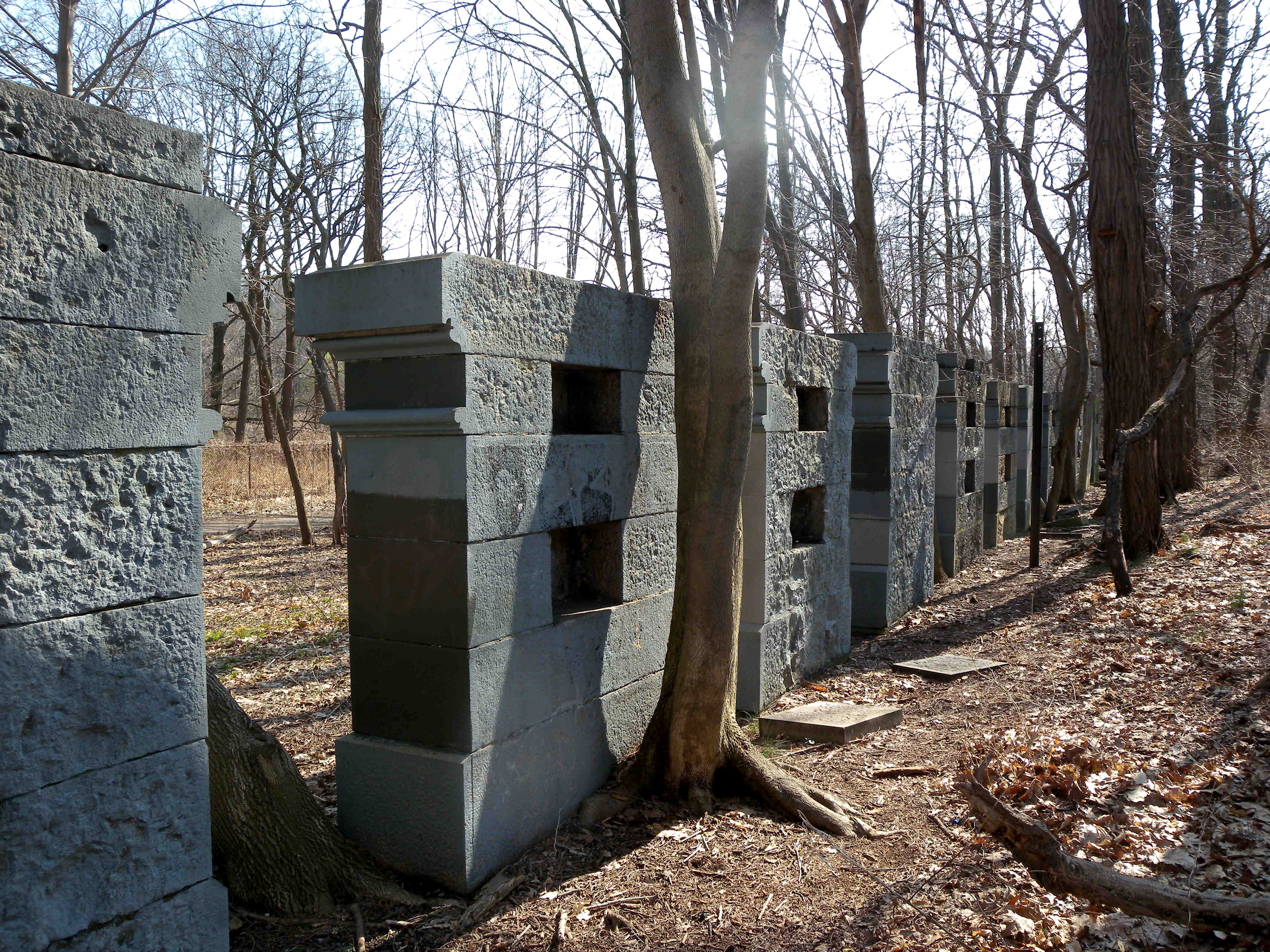
Structural stone testing site for the terminal facade in Van Cortlandt Park

Before construction, the architects tested several aspects that were to be included in the building. They installed ramps of different angles and watched as people of a variety of ages, heights, and weights walked up and down them, in unblinded and blind trials. The incline chosen was 8 degrees, reportedly gentle enough for a child to toddle from a train to 42nd Street. One additional test took place in Van Cortlandt Park in the Bronx, where 13 stone pillars were erected and allowed to weather. The architects wanted to choose a durable stone to use on Grand Central's facade, and thus pillars made of a different varieties of stone were installed in the woods (now by the John Kieran Nature Trail, which opened in 1987).The variety eventually chosen was Indiana limestone.

=== Construction starts ===
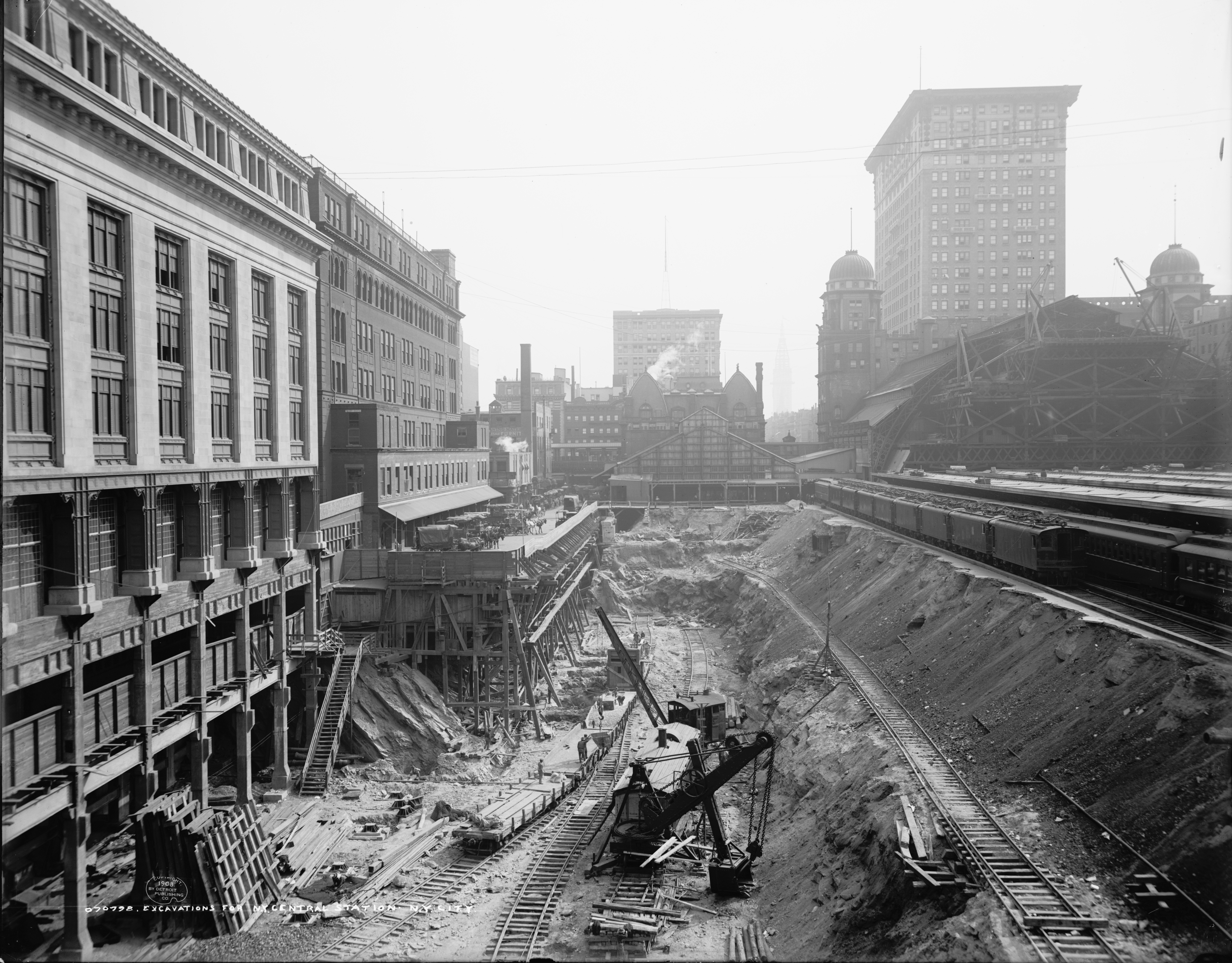
Excavation for the new terminal and demolition of the old station (center right), 1908

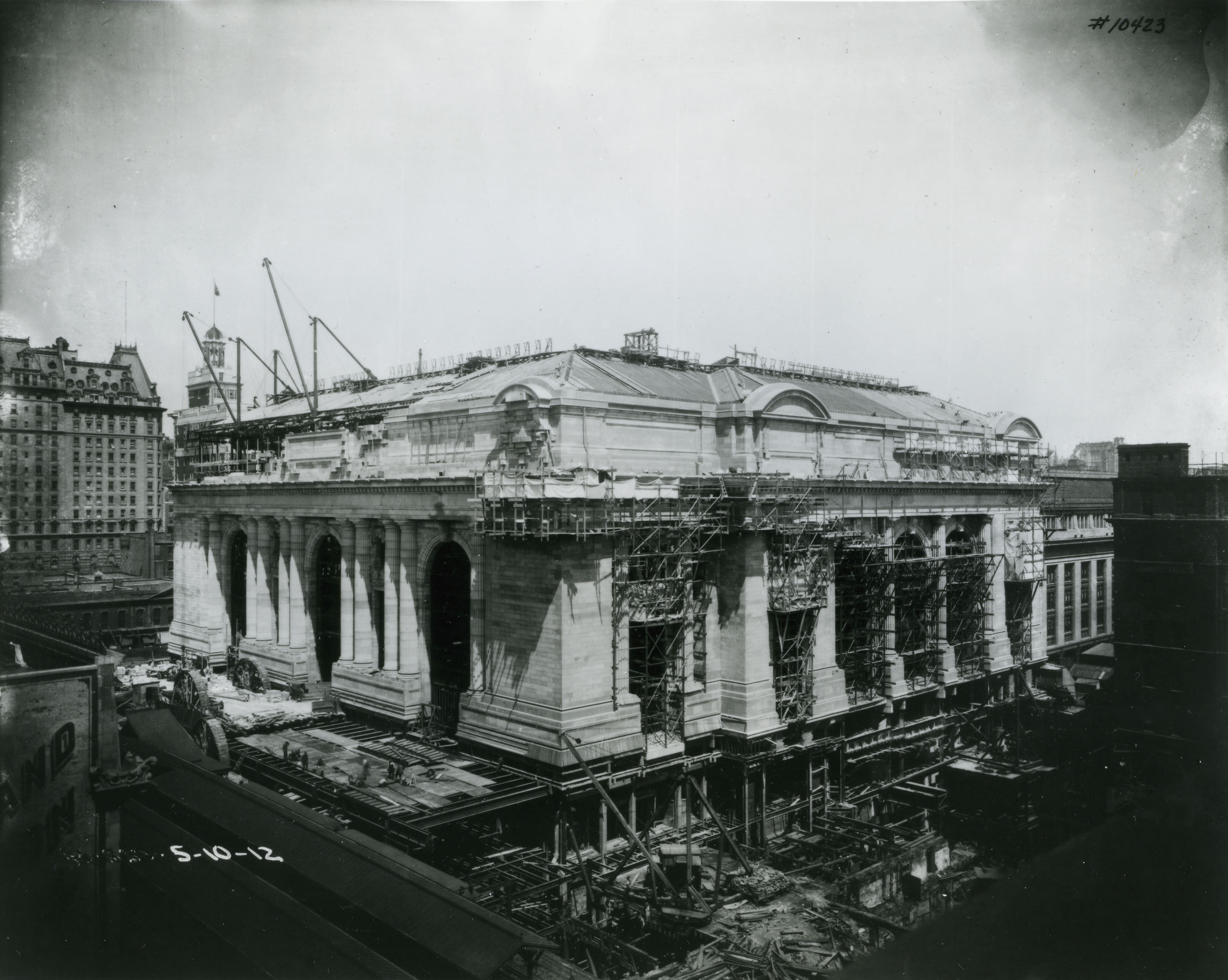
Terminal construction, 1912

Meanwhile, Wilgus, who had been tapped to lead the project, started to figure out ways to build the new terminal efficiently. To prevent interrupting railroad service, he decided to demolish, excavate, and build the terminal in sections. The project was to contain three phases or "bites" in total, moving from east to west. As originally planned, the first new bite was supposed to be completed in December 1905, and the last bites would be completed two or three years afterward.

Construction on Grand Central Terminal started on June 19, 1903, though official construction plans were not submitted to the city until December 1904. A contract for depressing the tracks on Park Avenue south of 57th Street, as well as for excavating the storage yards, was awarded to the O'Rourke Construction Company in August 1903. The following year, New York Central bought two additional blocks of land east of the future terminal, bounded by Lexington Avenue, Depew Place, and 43rd and 45th streets. This land acquisition included the Grand Central Palace Hotel, an exhibition hall that would be used as a temporary station during construction.

The construction project was enormous. About 3.2 million cubic yards (2,400,000 m^{3}) of the ground were excavated at depths of up to 10 floors, with 1,000 cubic yards (760 m^{3}) of debris being removed from the site daily. Over 10,000 workers were assigned to put 118,597 short tons (107,589 t) of steel and 33 miles (53 km) of track inside the final structure. The excavation produced too much spoil for horse-drawn wagons, which at the time could carry 3 or 4 cubic yards (2.3 or 3.1 m^{3}) apiece, so a 0.5-mile-long (0.80 km), 6-foot-wide (1.8 m) drainage tube was sunk 65 feet (20 m) under the ground to the East River. O'Rourke also carried waste away by train, using hopper cars to transport rock and earth to a landfill in Croton-on-Hudson, New York, via the Hudson Division. Excavations were only performed if there were available tracks to accommodate the work trains. Although construction continued around the clock, workers often halted every few minutes to allow trains to pass, and a smaller crew worked during the day than in the night. In addition, since Grand Central Station saw 800 trains per day, rock-blasting for excavation could only be performed at night, and only one track at a time could be taken out of service. Despite the scale of the project, no pedestrians were hurt during construction.

The first bite, which covered the area along Lexington Avenue, required the demolition of more than 200 buildings — and the eviction of hundreds of people from their homes — on a 17-acre (6.9 ha) plot of land bounded by Madison and Lexington avenues between 50th and 45th streets. O'Rourke soon fell behind schedule, and soon it was unable to excavate the first bite before the deadline of July 1, 1906. The construction company blamed New York Central for not making tracks available, thereby preventing its trains from hauling out debris, but was loath to hire more workers because it would cost more money. This considerably slowed construction progress. In May 1907, O'Rourke and New York Central terminated their contract. The first bite was described as being largely complete the same year.

The section-by-section building process doubled the cost of construction; at first the project was supposed to cost $40.7 million, but the cost jumped to $59.9 million in 1904 and to $71.8 million in 1906. The total cost of improvements, including electrification and the development of Park Avenue, was estimated at $180 million in 1910. Of that, the construction of Grand Central Terminal alone was expected to cost $100 million.

=== Ongoing construction and completion ===
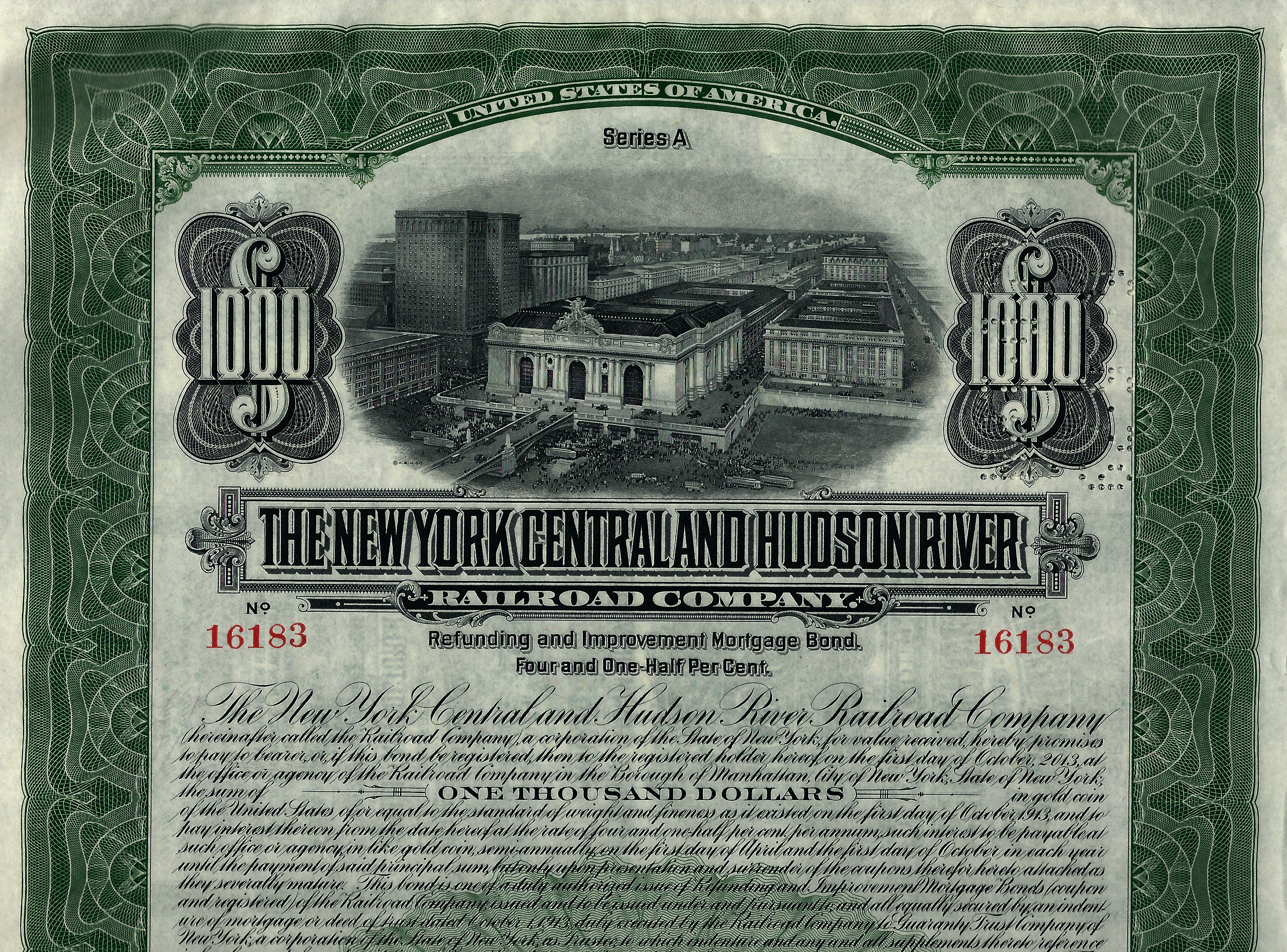
New York Central & Hudson River Railroad bond, prominently featuring the then-new Grand Central Terminal

The New York Central Railroad tested third-rail-powered electric trains in 1904, using a fleet of new MU Sprague-GE cars from the General Electric Company, and found that their speeds were adequate for service into Grand Central. Over the next few years, the New York Central and New Haven Railroads electrified their tracks, allowing trains to enter Grand Central Terminal upon its completion. The first electric train departed for the soon-to-be-demolished Grand Central Station, to the Harlem Division's High Bridge station in the Bronx, on September 30, 1906. Electrification was eventually extended to Croton–Harmon station, the Hudson Line's northern terminus. By late 1906, Harlem Division trains were also electrified, and its operations moved to the basement of Grand Central Palace; Harlem Line electrification would ultimately stretch as far north as Southeast station. New Haven Division electric trains started running to Grand Central in October 1907. Though the segments of the lines into Grand Central were electrified by 1907, full electrification on the remaining parts of these lines was not completed until 1913. Subsequently, as Grand Central Terminal was being completed, all three commuter rail lines moved their operations to Grand Central Palace.

Work on the yard progressed slowly, due to the small size of each individual bite, as well as the difficulty of designing two levels with separate track layouts, and the need for ultra-strong columns to support the upper level. The upper level was covered over in 1910. The second and third bites were harder to construct than the first bite, as these were located over the most active sections of track on the west and center sides of Grand Central. North of the station site, Park Avenue and surrounding streets were raised onto bridges above the tracks.

The first and second bites had been completed by 1910. The last train left Grand Central Station at midnight on June 5, 1910, and workers promptly began demolishing the old station. A large scaffold, as high and wide as the trusses of the train shed, was erected at the rear of the shed. The scaffold was built on rollers, and as each section was demolished, the scaffold was moved to the next section. The design of the new station was not finalized until 1910 because certain design elements of the new terminal, such as the Main Concourse, were not decided until most of Grand Central Station had been demolished In January 1911, the railroad filed 55 blueprints for the new station building with the New York City Department of Buildings, among the most comprehensive sets of plans that had ever been submitted to the department. The last tracks from the former Grand Central Station were decommissioned on June 21, 1912.

On December 19, 1910, a gas explosion at an electrical substation near Grand Central killed 10 people and injured 117 more. It was later discovered that a motorman had accidentally broken a gas storage tank, causing a leak. A jury later declined to find the motorman guilty of wrongdoing.

== 1910s–1940s: Opening and heyday ==
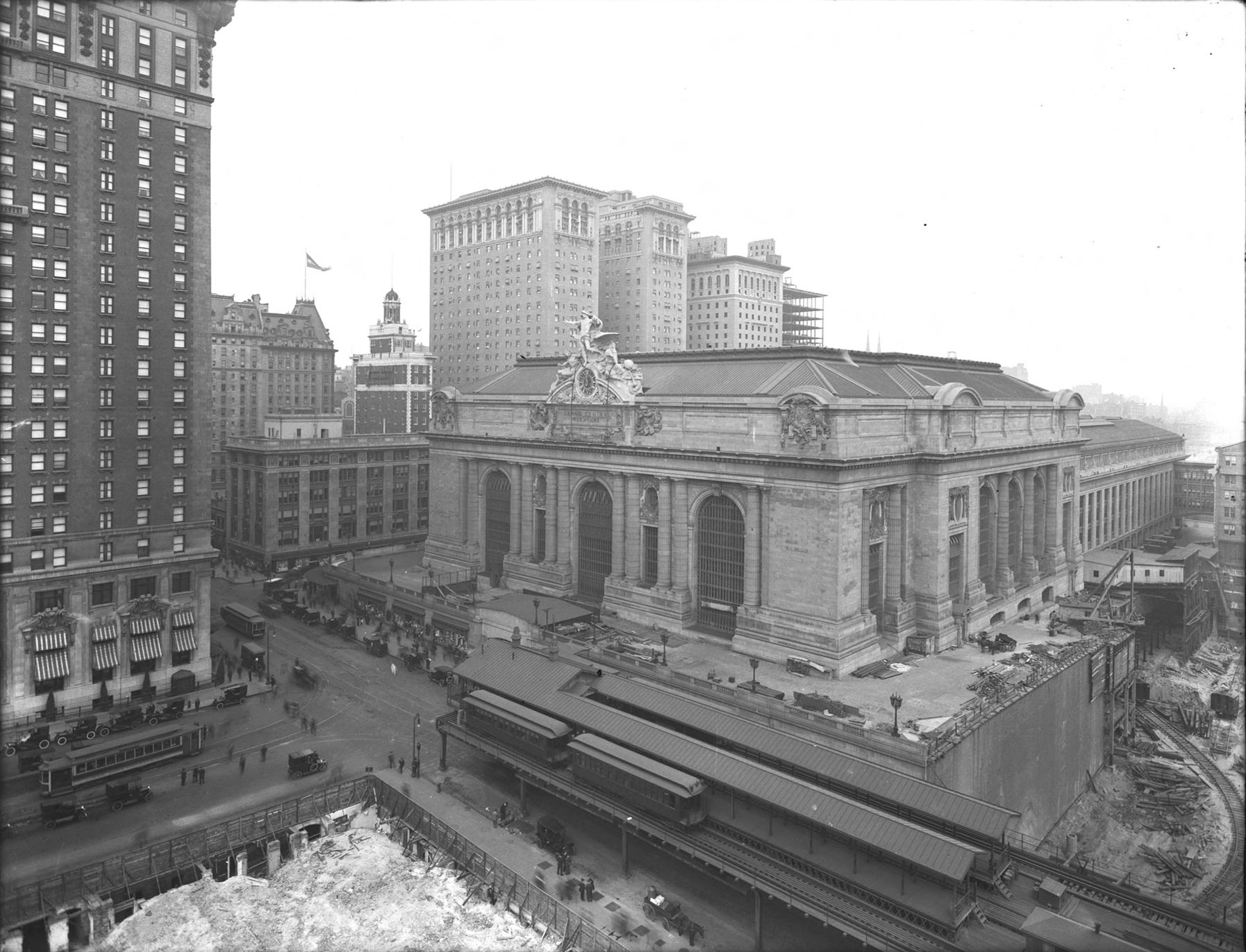
The terminal alongside the Grand Central IRT elevated station, c. 1914

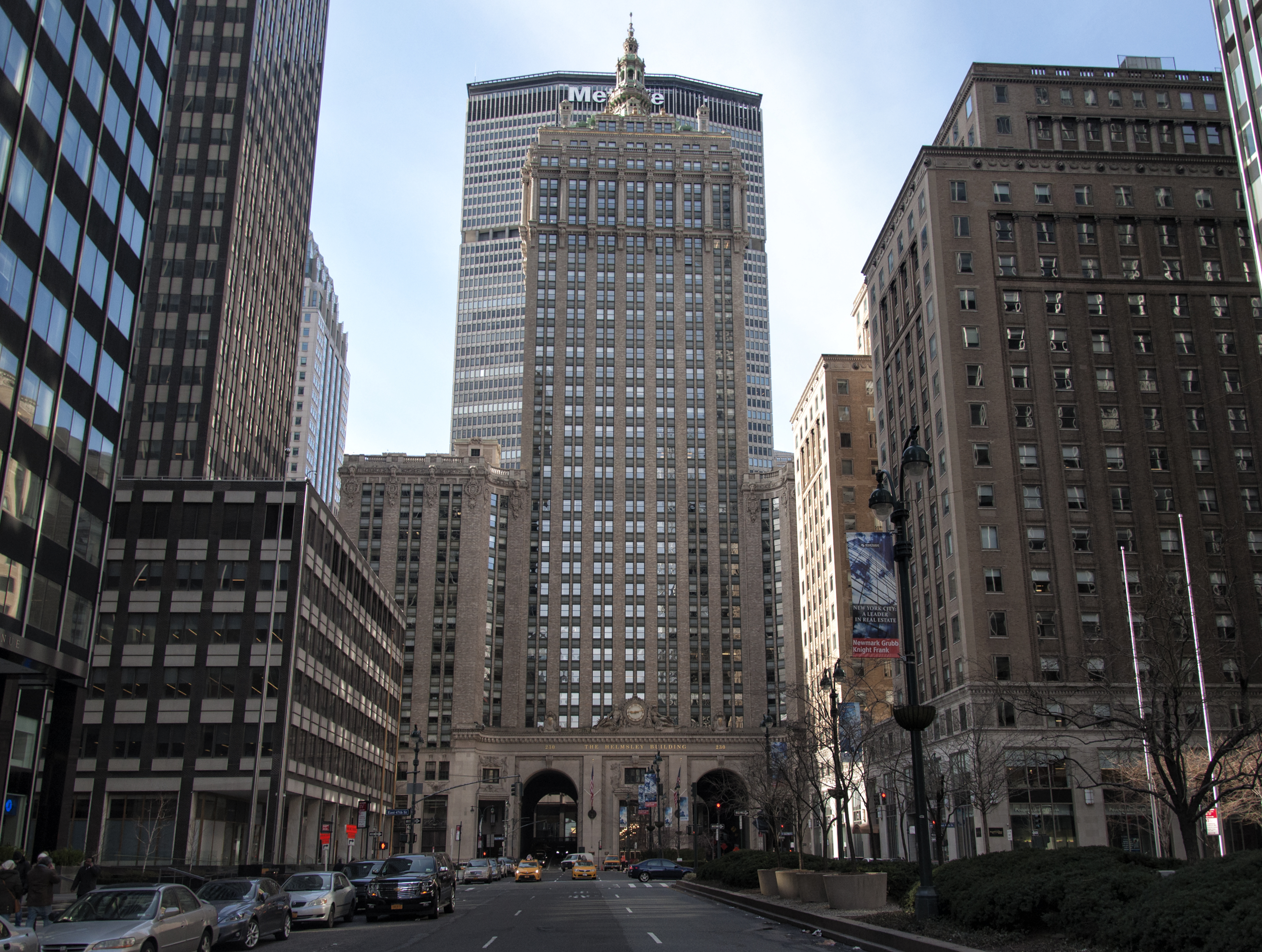
The Helmsley Building, in foreground, was built as part of Terminal City, a commercial and office district created above the tracks.

On February 2, 1913, the new terminal was opened. Passengers boarded the first train at one minute past midnight. The opening had been celebrated one day prior with a private dinner for Warren and Wetmore and 100 guests at the Grand Central Terminal Restaurant. Within 16 hours of its opening, an estimated 150,000 people had passed through the new station. The building was nearly finished by this point, although some additions would take place later, including the installation of Glory of Commerce in 1914.

The terminal spurred development in the surrounding area, particularly in Terminal City, a commercial and office district created above where the tracks were covered. Land values along Park Avenue and in Terminal City more than tripled from 1904 to 1926. Terminal City would eventually include office buildings such as the Chrysler Building; luxury apartment houses along Park Avenue; and an array of high-end hotels. The Commodore Hotel, built on the east side of Grand Central Terminal, was opened in 1919. Terminal City was mostly complete by the late 1920s with the completion of the Graybar Building in 1927 and the Helmsley Building in 1929. The development of Terminal City also included the construction of the Park Avenue Viaduct, surrounding the station; one leg of the viaduct opened in 1919, and another part of the viaduct opened in 1928.

The electrification of the commuter lines and subsequent completion of Grand Central Terminal contributed to the development of affluent suburbs in the lower Hudson Valley and southwestern Connecticut. This trend had been observed as early as 1907, following the completion of electrification. Well-to-do passengers were likely to travel to destinations served by electric trains that ran directly from Grand Central, such as Greenwich or Larchmont, while less wealthy passengers were likely to get off at stops that were further away, such as Stamford or New Rochelle. New York Central promoted new private suburban developments through its “Four-Track Series" magazine. Following Grand Central Terminal's completion, traffic to and from the new terminal increased considerably. In the fiscal year ending June 30, 1913, Grand Central handled 22.4 million passengers. By 1920, a total of 37 million passengers used the station. However, Grand Central was not the most-used station in New York City after 1919, because Penn Station consistently saw more passengers than Grand Central. Even so, Grand Central's development led to the rapid growth of New York City's northern suburbs. The Bronx's population nearly quadrupled between 1900 and 1920, while Westchester's population more than doubled.

In 1918, flags were hung in Grand Central Terminal, honoring railroad employees who were fighting in World War I. One flag read 4,976 for the number of New York Central employees serving, another read 1,412 for New York, New Haven & Hartford employees, and a third read 104 for Grand Central Terminal employees.

In 1918, New York Central proposed expanding Grand Central Terminal. Three tracks would be built on the outside of the suburban level, new platforms would be built, and the ramps to the platforms would be widened. A power plant would also be constructed at 43rd Street. Passenger numbers continued to grow, and by 1927, the terminal saw 43 million annual passengers. Minor improvements were made to Grand Central Terminal during the 1920s and 1930s, such as the 1926 opening of the Graybar Passageway, as well as the 1937 opening of Grand Central's newsreel theater. In 1938, two lower-level platforms were extended to allow commuters to board more easily. By that year, the terminal was regularly accommodating 100,000 passengers and at least 300,000 visitors on an average weekday.

The ridership of New York Central as a whole declined slightly during the Great Depression. Regulations from the Interstate Commerce Commission and competition from automobile traffic were cited as factors in this decline. The railroad's finances were also put in danger because of the large amounts of debt incurred during the construction of Grand Central Terminal and Terminal City. New York Central's debt had grown from $299 million in 1911 to $377 million in 1914. By 1932, the railroad could not pay dividends to its stockholders, though this financial deficit was somewhat ameliorated by the end of the decade.

=== Associated structures ===
When Grand Central Terminal opened, it contained a direct connection to the adjacent IRT subway station. The current 42nd Street Shuttle platforms were part of the original IRT subway, which opened in 1904. The IRT Flushing Line platform, served by the 7 and <7> trains, opened in 1915, two years after Grand Central Terminal's opening. The IRT Lexington Avenue Line platforms, served by the 4, 5, 6, and <6> trains, opened in 1918.

The Grand Central Art Galleries opened in the terminal in 1923. The space was operated by the Painters and Sculptors Gallery Association, founded by artists John Singer Sargent, Edmund Greacen, Walter Leighton Clark, and others. At its opening, the Galleries extended over most of the terminal's sixth floor, 15,000 square feet (1,400 m^{2}), and offered eight main exhibition rooms, a foyer gallery, and a reception area. The official opening on March 22, 1923, was attended by 5,000 people. A year after it opened, the galleries established the Grand Central School of Art, which occupied 7,000 square feet (650 m^{2}) on the seventh floor of the east wing of the terminal. The school was directed by Sargent and Daniel Chester French. The Grand Central School of Art remained in the east wing until 1944. In 1958, the Grand Central Art Galleries moved out of the terminal, to the Biltmore Hotel. (Note: They remained at the Biltmore for 23 years until 1981, and then moved to 24 West 57th Street, ceasing operations by 1994.)

A power and heating plant had been built in conjunction with the terminal, on the east side of Park Avenue between 49th and 50th streets. The plant provided power to the tracks and the station, as well as to nearby buildings. By the late 1920s, the power and heating plant had become largely unnecessary, as most power and heating services were contracted out to Consolidated Edison. The power plant was torn down starting in 1929 and replaced by the Waldorf Astoria New York hotel. A new substation was built 100 feet (30 m) under the Graybar Building at a cost of $3 million, and opened in February 1930.

=== J. P. Carey & Co. ===
In 1913 when the terminal opened, J. P. Carey leased 12 square feet (1.1 m^{2}) and opened a shop adjacent to and one level below the terminal's waiting room (now Vanderbilt Hall). Carey's business expanded to include a barbershop, laundry service, shoe store, and haberdashery, all under the name J. P. Carey & Co. In 1921, Carey also ran a limousine service using Packard cars, and in the 1930s, he added regular car and bus service to the city's airports as they opened. The businesses were very successful due to their location and show windows that Carey installed. Terminal shops were known to inflate prices, so the Carey businesses displayed affordable items with visible price tags in its show windows, as opposed to the norm of displaying the most expensive and luxury items.

Carey would store his merchandise in an unfinished, underground two-story section of the terminal, which railroad employees and maintenance staff began calling "Carey's Hole". The name has remained even as the space has been used for different purposes, including currently as a lounge and dormitory for railroad employees.

=== World War II ===
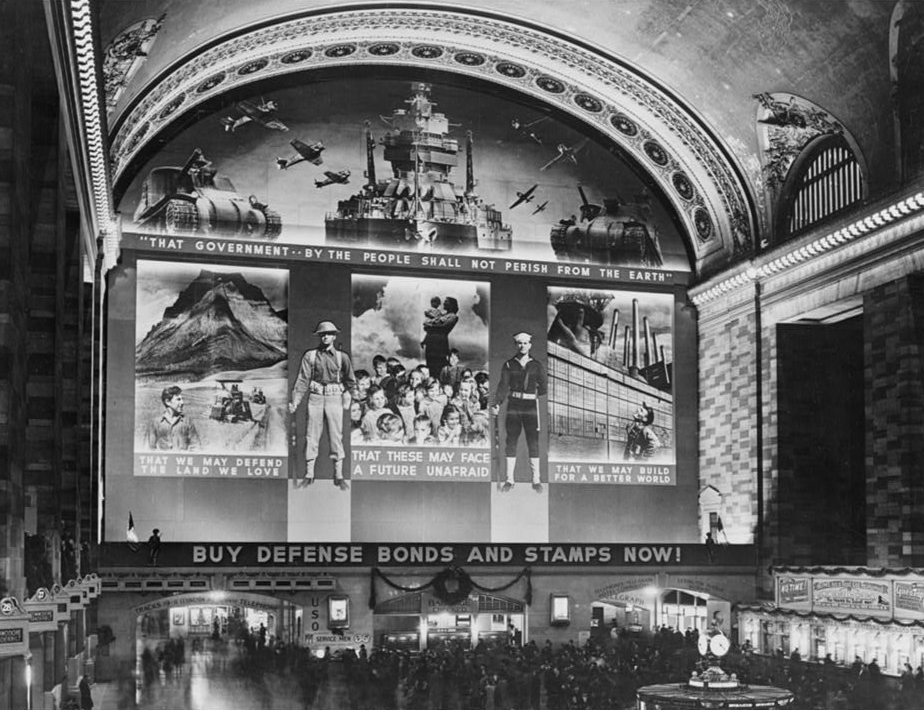
1941 Farm Security Administration mural to promote the sales of war bonds

During World War II, the terminal became heavily used by troops moving across the United States, and thus additional ticket offices were opened. Mary Lee Read, an organist playing in the terminal from 1928 to the late 1950s, brought commuter traffic to a standstill during the war while playing the U.S. national anthem, and was subsequently asked by the stationmaster not to play the anthem and delay commuters. Also during the war, retired employees rejoined the terminal's staff, and women first began being trained as ticket agents, both to make up for the lack of younger men. Due to Grand Central's importance in civilian and military transit, the terminal's windows were covered with blackout paint, which would prevent aerial bombers from easily detecting the building.

The war also prompted the Farm Security Administration to install a 118 ft × 100 ft (36 m × 30 m) mural on the Main Concourse's east wall in 1941. The mural, which had a montage of photographs, was part of a campaign to sell war bonds, and its unveiling was a nationally broadcast event that also drew 3,000 people on-site. In 1943, this mural was replaced by another, 75 by 30 feet (22.9 m × 9.1 m), also installed over the east wall. A large flag also hung in the Main Concourse honoring the 21,314 New York Central Railroad employees that participated in the war.

The terminal also hosted a canteen operated by the United Service Organizations. Known as the Service Men's Lounge, the space on the east balcony had pool and ping pong tables, a piano, lounge chairs, and lunch counters. The terminal was used for military funeral processions as well.

== 1950s–1980s: Decline and gradual restoration ==
=== 1950s: Demolition and modification proposals ===
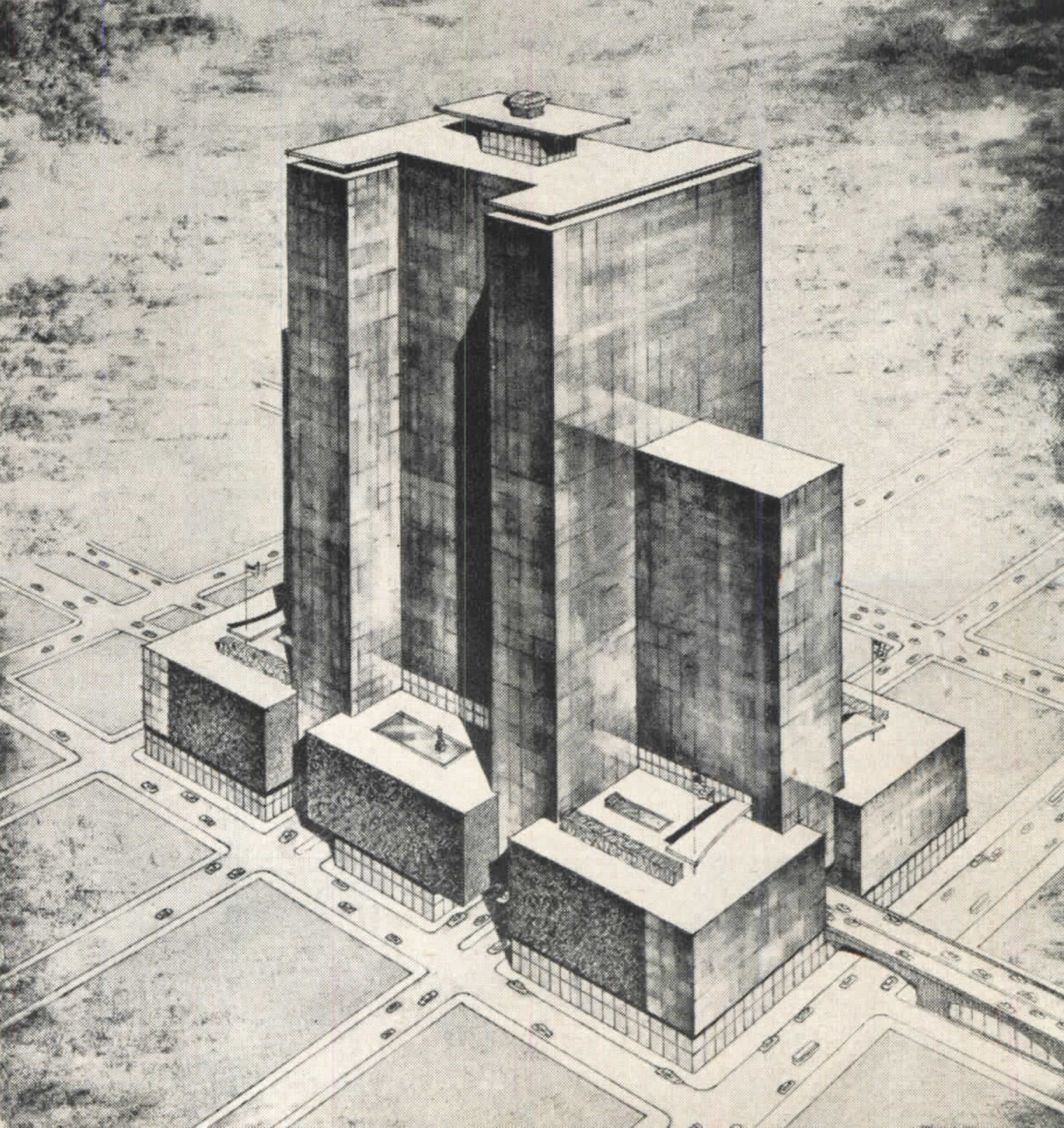
Replacement structure proposed by Fellheimer & Wagner, 1954

Grand Central's ridership began to rise again during and after World War II. Its annual passenger traffic reached its apogee in 1946, with more than 65 million passengers. The station's decline came soon afterward with the beginning of the Jet Age and the construction of the Interstate Highway System. In particular, the New York State Thruway, completed in 1954, was a direct competitor to all three of New York Central's commuter rail lines that ran into Grand Central. Around this time, passenger volumes had declined so dramatically that there were proposals to demolish and replace the station. In 1954, New York Central considered at least two of these proposals—one by Fellheimer & Wagner and another by I. M. Pei. The railroad company was losing money (partially on paying taxes on the building's air rights), and wanted to sell the property or its air rights, allowing construction of a skyscraper above or in place of the terminal. Fellheimer & Wagner's proposal called for a 55-story building, the largest office building in the world with four to six million square feet. I. M. Pei, along with the developer William Zeckendorf, initially proposed an 80-story, 5-million-square-foot (460,000 m^{2}) tower that would have succeeded the Empire State Building as the world's tallest building; this evolved into the Hyperboloid, a 108-story wasp-waisted glass cylinder. The plans by Fellheimer & Wagner and I. M. Pei prompted 235 letters from American architects to Grand Central's railroad directors, urging them to save the terminal. Neither design was ultimately carried out.

By 1958, New York Central proposed abandoning its commuter lines and stations in New York City and closing Grand Central Terminal. However, Grand Central remained a busy hub. In 1960, the terminal had 2,035 employees, including its own fire inspection team, a 37-member police force, and two doctors and two nurses in its own emergency facility. It also held religious services hosted three times a week on track 13.

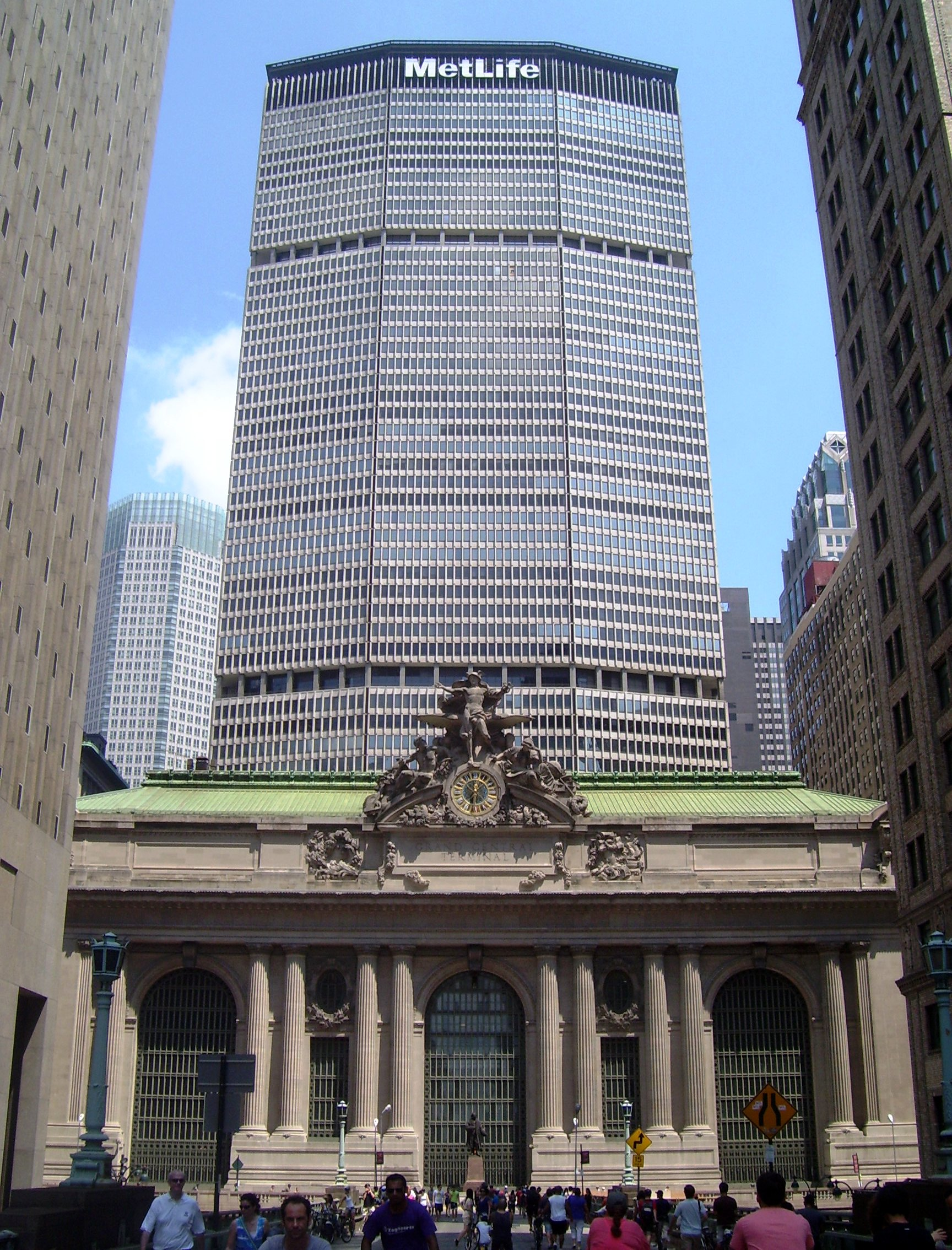
The MetLife Building, completed in 1963, is just north of Grand Central Terminal's head house and is above the platforms.

In March 1955, to increase revenue for New York Central, the company's chairman Robert R. Young invited developers to submit proposals to redevelop the terminal. Developer Erwin S. Wolfson proposed a 65-story tower to replace the six-story baggage structure north of the terminal. A modified proposal for a 50-story tower was approved in 1958. The tower became the Pan Am Building (now the MetLife Building), which was opened in 1963.

=== 1960s: Further proposals and court decisions ===
Another controversial proposal, put forward in August 1960, called for the upper 47 feet (14 m) of the 58-foot-tall waiting room to be converted into a three-story bowling alley. The proposal was controversial and critics referred to it as a "desecration" of Grand Central. The city vetoed the proposal in January 1961. The New York Central and New Haven Railroads unsuccessfully challenged the decision in state and federal court.

Although the Pan Am Building's completion averted the terminal's imminent destruction, the New York Central continued to decline, and in 1968 it merged with the Pennsylvania Railroad to form the Penn Central Railroad. The Pennsylvania Railroad had started demolishing Penn Station's original station building in 1963, and over the following years, it was replaced with the current Pennsylvania Station, above which was built Madison Square Garden. The demolition of Penn Station directly resulted in the creation of the New York City Landmarks Preservation Commission, which made Grand Central Terminal a designated city landmark in August 1967.

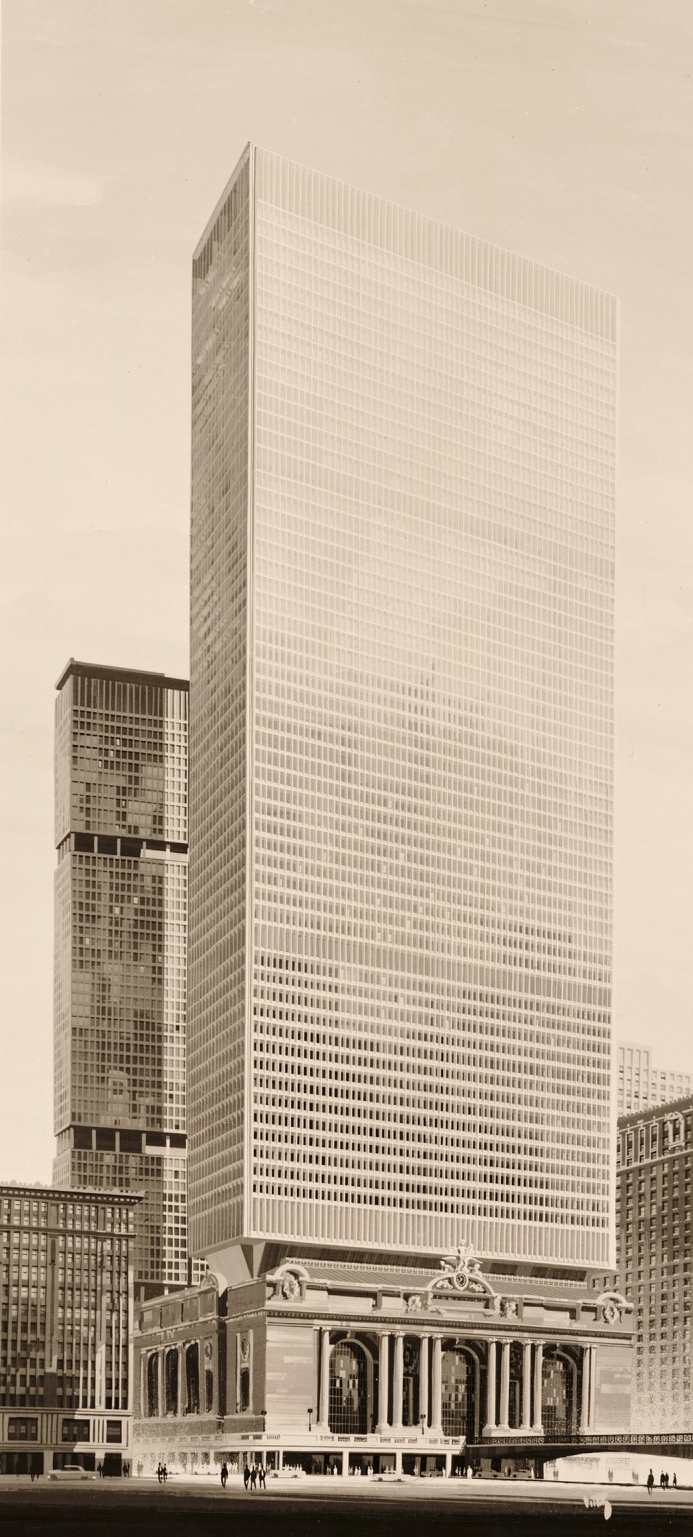
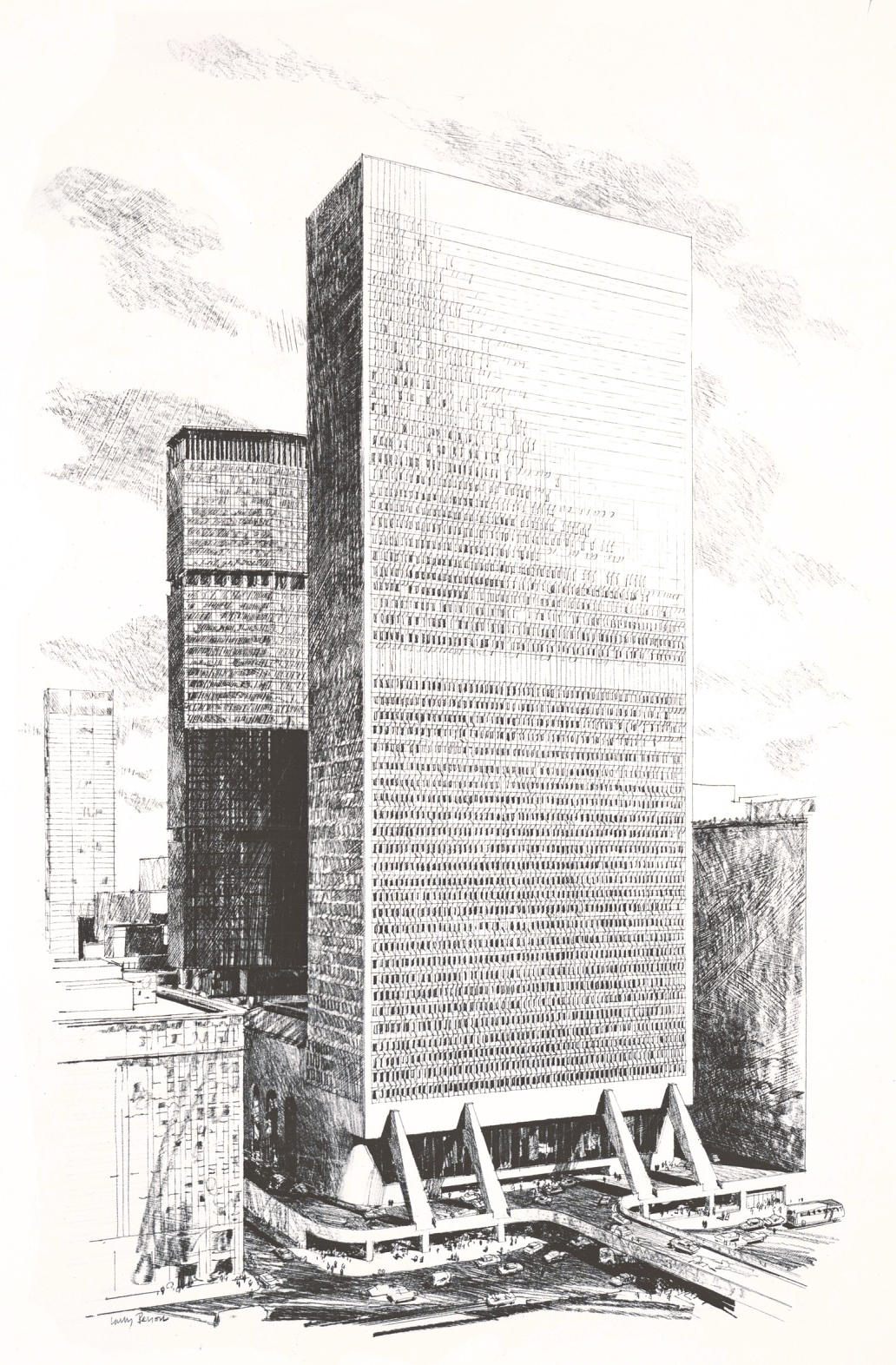
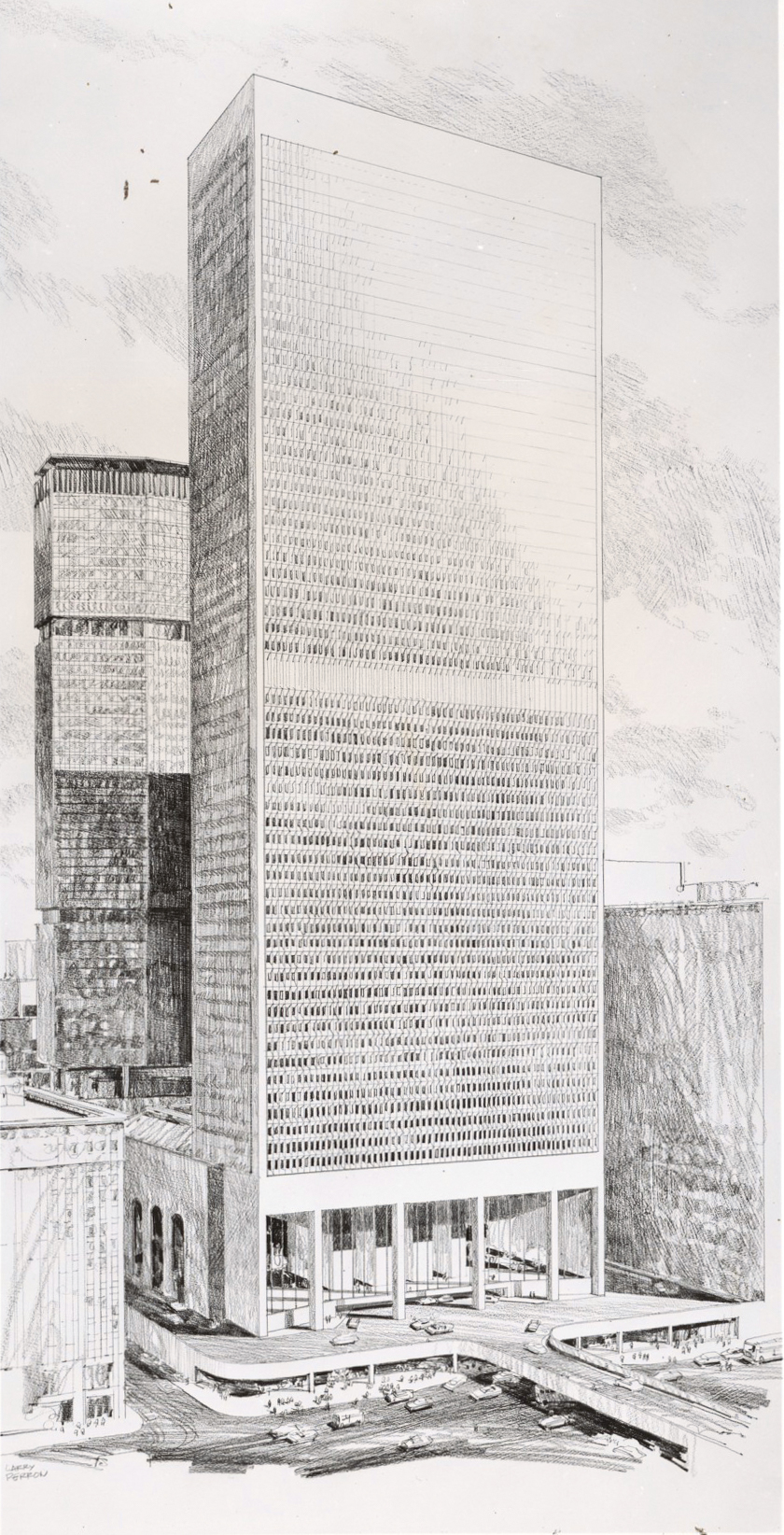
Marcel Breuer proposals for Grand Central Tower included variations keeping the 1913 facade and demolishing it.

In February 1968, six months after Grand Central Terminal was landmarked, plans were announced for a tower over the terminal, known as Grand Central Tower and designed by Marcel Breuer. With a proposed height of 950 feet (290 m), the tower would have stood 150 feet (46 m) taller than the Pan Am Building, and its footprint would have measured 309 by 152 feet (94 by 46 m), the same size as the Main Concourse. The tower would have spared the Main Concourse, using the existing building's support structure and four huge trusses to cantilever over the concourse, but the southern third of the terminal would have been destroyed to make way for elevator lobbies and a taxi drop-off area.

The plans drew huge opposition from the public and from architects. The most prominent criticisms came from Jacqueline Kennedy Onassis, who stated:

Is it not cruel to let our city die by degrees, stripped of all her proud monuments, until there will be nothing left of all her history and beauty to inspire our children? If they are not inspired by the past of our city, where will they find the strength to fight for her future? Americans care about their past, but for short term gain they ignore it and tear down everything that matters. Maybe... this is the time to take a stand, to reverse the tide, so that we won't all end up in a uniform world of steel and glass boxes.

— Jacqueline Kennedy Onassis

In response to criticism, Penn Central modified the proposal in June 1969, decreasing the footprint of the proposed building and relocating it closer to the Pan Am Building. However, because of Grand Central's landmark status, the Landmarks Preservation Commission prohibited Penn Central from executing either of Breuer's two blueprints. The railroad sued the city, alleging a taking, and in January 1975, a judge for the New York Supreme Court invalidated the New York City landmark designation. Major personalities and the public held rallies to prevent the demolition of the terminal, and the New York Supreme Court's decision was overturned by an appeals court that December. The railroad's lawsuit against the city, Penn Central Transportation Co. v. New York City, was decided by the Supreme Court of the United States in 1978. In a 6–3 decision, the Supreme Court ruled in favor of the city, holding that New York City's Landmarks Preservation Act did not constitute a "taking" of Penn Central's property under the Fifth Amendment. That final ruling prevented Penn Central from constructing the proposed tower.

=== Ownership changes ===
The Metropolitan Transportation Authority, formed in 1965 and expanded through mergers with other transit agencies in 1968, started leasing the Penn Central trackage upon its formation. The MTA took partial ownership of the New Haven Line in January 1971, and gained ownership of the Hudson and Harlem Lines in May 1972. After Penn Central went bankrupt in 1970, its railroad operations were taken over by Conrail in 1976, but Penn Central retained title to Grand Central Terminal. In 1983, the MTA took over full operations of the Harlem, Hudson, and New Haven Lines and combined them to form the Metro-North Commuter Railroad.

=== 1970s: Gradual restoration ===
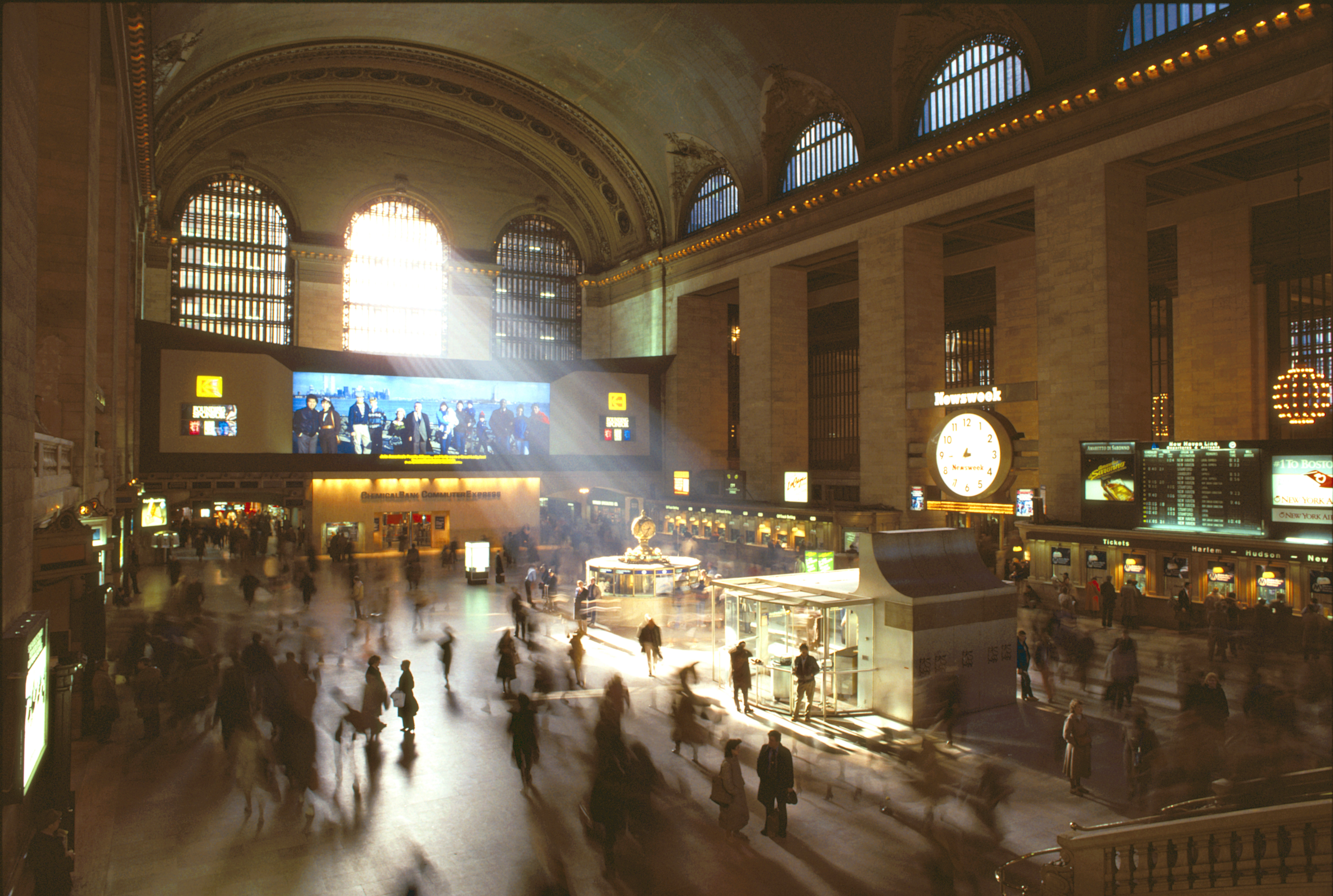
The Kodak Colorama, a Newsweek clock advertisement, and two banks inside the Main Concourse in 1986

Grand Central and the surrounding neighborhood became dilapidated during the financial collapse of its host railroads and the near bankruptcy of New York City itself. The interior of Grand Central was dominated by huge billboard advertisements. The most famous was the giant Kodak Colorama photos that ran along the entire east side, installed in 1950, and the Westclox "Big Ben" clock over the south concourse. The clock was sponsored by various companies throughout the latter half of the 20th century. In 1971, with state legalization of off-track horse race betting, ten ticket windows were repurposed for wagering on horse racing.

In 1975, real estate developer and later U.S. president Donald Trump bought the Commodore Hotel to the east of the terminal for $10 million and then worked out a deal with hotel magnate Jay Pritzker to transform it into Grand Hyatt New York, one of the first Grand Hyatt hotels. Trump negotiated various tax breaks and, in the process, agreed to renovate the exterior of the terminal. The complementary masonry from the Commodore was covered with a mirror-glass "slipcover" facade; the masonry still exists underneath. In the same deal, Trump optioned Penn Central's rail yards on the Hudson River between 59th and 72nd streets that eventually became Trump Place, the biggest private development in New York City. The Grand Hyatt opened in 1980 and the neighborhood immediately began a transformation. Trump would sell his half-share in the hotel for $140 million in 1996.

To improve passenger flow, a new passageway at Grand Central was opened in May 1975. Grand Central Terminal was listed on the National Register of Historic Places in 1975 and declared a National Historic Landmark in the following year. The interior was ultimately designated as a city landmark in 1980.

On September 10, 1976, a group of Croatian nationalists planted a bomb in a coin locker at Grand Central Terminal. The group also hijacked a TWA airplane (Flight 355). After stating their political demands, they revealed the location of the planted explosives, which were removed and taken to a bomb squad demolition range in the Bronx. The bomb exploded as the police attempted to disarm it, injuring three New York City Police Department officers and killing another, a bomb squad specialist.

=== 1980s: Air rights and withdrawal of intercity service ===
After the failure of the Breuer proposal, Penn Central had some 1.8 million square feet (170,000 m^{2}) of air rights above Grand Central Terminal and its rail yards, of which only 75,000 square feet (7,000 m^{2}) had been used to date. In 1983, it transferred about 1.5 million square feet (140,000 m^{2}) of these air rights to a partnership led by G. Ware Travelstead and First Boston Corporation. The group proposed to use the air rights to construct a 1.4-million-square-foot (130,000 m^{2}), 1,029-foot-tall (314 m) building on the site of an existing 600,000-square-foot (56,000 m^{2}) office tower at 383 Madison Avenue, near 46th Street, which partially overhung the underground rail yards. This would use up 800,000 square feet (74,000 m^{2}) of the air rights. However, when the local community board vetoed the office building proposal, the developers threatened to build the tower above Grand Central's station building instead, or risk losing money because they could not use the air rights. In August 1989, the New York City Planning Commission rejected the plan to transfer the air rights to the 383 Madison Avenue site because the proposed site was not adjacent to the terminal, but rather, was only connected via a series of underground properties. A state judge upheld the city's decision in 1991.

In the early 1980s, plans were developed for a series of passageways at the northern end of the station, leading to brand-new exits at locations at 45th through 48th Streets. The project, which later became Grand Central North, would be the first major expansion to Grand Central Terminal since 1913. Preliminary plans for Grand Central North were approved by the MTA board in 1983, though final approval for the project was not given until 1991. The MTA performed some restorations at Grand Central in the late 1980s, in advance of the terminal's 75th anniversary in 1988. The project restored the building's cornice, removed blackout paint applied to the skylights during World War II, installed new doors, and cleaned marble floors and walls. The leaking copper roof, damaged as a result of several patchwork repair jobs over the years, was resurfaced. The Biltmore Room was renovated in 1985 by Giorgio Cavaglieri, and new departures and arrivals boards were installed above the ticket booths in the Main Concourse that June.

In 1988, Amtrak announced that it would stop serving the station upon the completion of the Empire Connection on Manhattan's West Side, which would allow trains using the Empire Corridor from Albany, Toronto, and Montreal to use Penn Station. At the time, all Amtrak services using the Northeast Corridor had been consolidated at Penn Station, and Amtrak passengers who wanted to transfer between Empire and Northeast Corridor services had to walk or otherwise transit the roughly one-half mile between the stations. The two stations had never been connected, even when they came under common ownership with the Penn Central merger. Not only did Amtrak have to spend a considerable amount to maintain two stations in New York City, but it also had to pay the MTA over $600,000 a year to use the tracks leading to Grand Central. The final regular Amtrak train stopped at Grand Central on April 7, 1991. Proposals to consolidate all intercity service at Penn Station had been considered on numerous occasions over the years. However, none of them moved beyond the planning stages until the 1980s. The opening of the Empire Connection made transfers between Empire and Northeast Corridor services much more convenient; indeed, a number of passengers had balked at traveling to New York City via train due to the need to make their own way between Grand Central and Penn Station.

Since then, Grand Central has almost exclusively served Metro-North Railroad. However, it has been pressed into service for Amtrak on two brief occasions due to maintenance at Penn Station. It served Empire Service trains in summer 2017 and several of its former Amtrak routes—the Empire Service, Maple Leaf, Ethan Allen Express, and Adirondack trains—in summer 2018.

== 1990s: Major restoration ==
=== Planning ===
External videos
- For details on the 1990s renovation, see: "Grand Central Terminal, Reborn" on YouTube, CBS News Sunday Morning, February 14, 1999

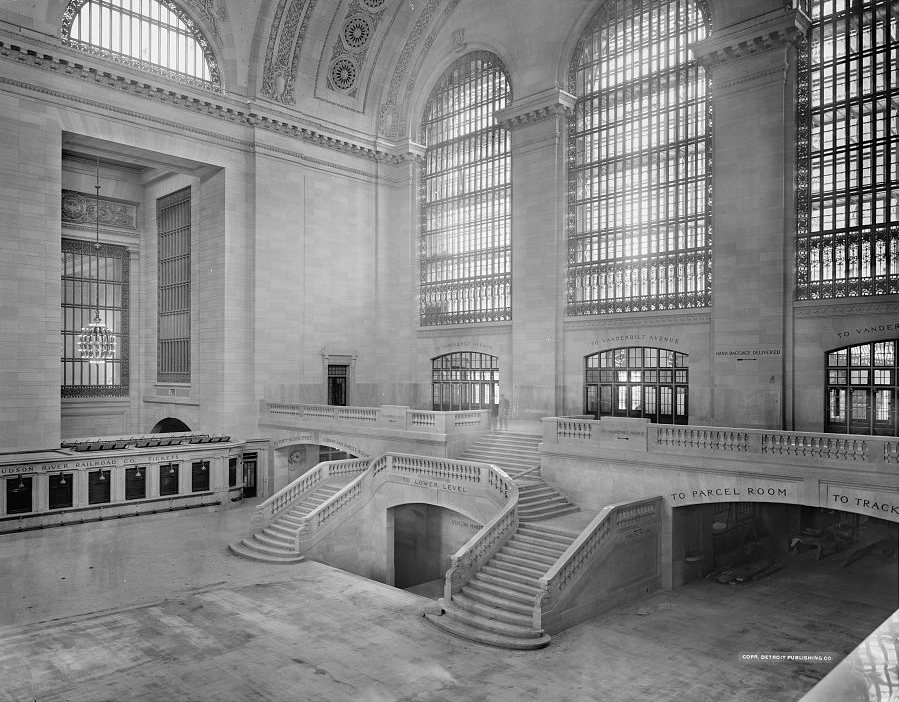
The western balcony in the main concourse c. 1910–1920; this was turned into a retail area during the 1990s

In 1988, the MTA commissioned a study of the Grand Central Terminal, hiring the architects Beyer Blinder Belle, Harry Weese, and Seelye Stevenson Value & Knecht to create a master plan. The report found that parts of the terminal could be turned into a retail area, and the balconies could be used for "high-quality" restaurants. This would increase the terminal's annual retail and advertising revenue from $8 million to $17 million. At the time, more than 80 million subway and Metro-North passengers used Grand Central Terminal every year, but eight of 73 storefronts were empty, and almost three-quarters of leases were set to expire by 1990. The total cost of an extensive renovation was estimated at $400 million, which was considered an exorbitant amount. Minor maintenance continued to occur. By the end of 1989, the Kodak Colorama advertisements were planned to be removed from the Main Concourse, though the removal of the Colorama exhibit did not happen until March 1990. The MTA rehabilitated the large clock at the south facade in 1992, giving the clock its first-ever complete restoration.

By December 1993, the MTA was finalizing plans to sign a 110-year, $55 million lease on the Grand Central Terminal as part of an agreement to renovate the terminal. In the same transaction, the amount of retail space was increased from 105,000 to 155,000 square feet (9,800 to 14,400 m^{2}). When Penn Central reorganized as American Premier Underwriters (APU) in 1994, it retained ownership of Grand Central Terminal. APU would later be absorbed by American Financial Group. The same year, the MTA signed a 280-year lease for the terminal with APU.

In January 1995, the agency announced an $113.8 million renovation of the terminal, the most extensive rehabilitation in its history. Some $30 million was to come from Metro-North's capital allocation, the other $84 million through the sale of bonds. The MTA predicted that the renovation would be completed in 1998, and that the retail space would net $13 million in annual revenue the following year, increasing to $17.5 million in 2009. In preparation for the renovation, some three dozen shops were evicted from the terminal in late 1995 and early 1996. Simultaneously, the adjacent subway station was slated to receive an $82 million renovation.

=== Rehabilitation ===
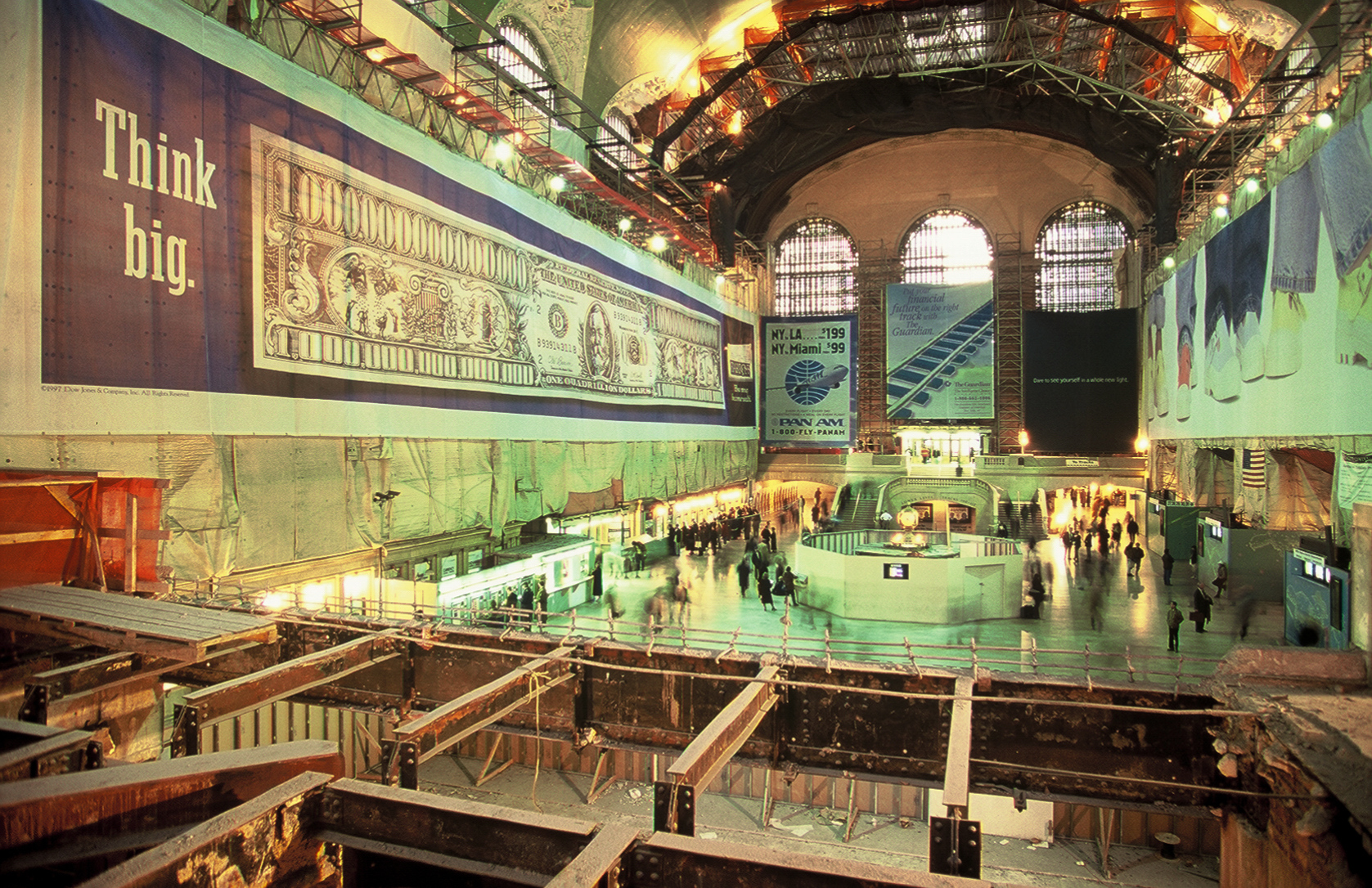
The Main Concourse undergoing restoration, late 1990s

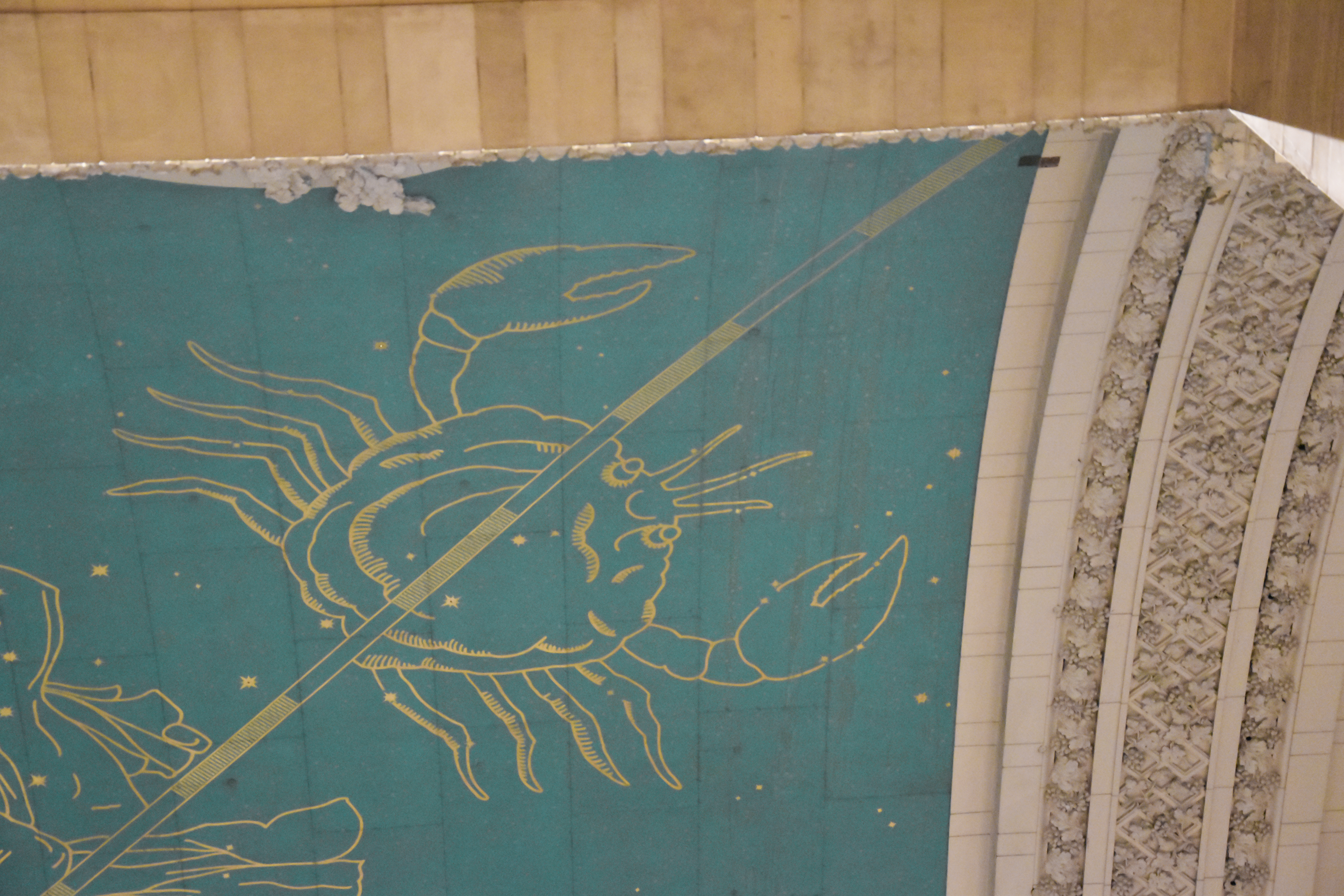
A single patch remains uncleaned following the ceiling's restoration; the Cancer constellation points toward it

During the 1995 renovation, all billboards were removed and the station was restored. Construction was also started on Grand Central North, the system of passageways leading north of Grand Central, in 1994, The most striking effect of the project was the restoration of the Main Concourse ceiling, revealing the painted skyscape and constellations. The renovations included the construction of the East Stairs, a curved monumental staircase on the east side of the station building that matched the West Stairs. The stairs were proposed in 1994, and were built on the site of the original baggage room, which had since been converted into retail space. Although the baggage room had been designed by the original architects, the restoration architects found evidence that a set of stairs mirroring those to the West was originally intended for that space.

The original quarry in Tennessee was reopened to provide stone for the new staircase and to replace damaged stone elsewhere. Each piece of new stone was labeled with its installation date and the fact that it was not a part of the original terminal building. The waiting room was restored and the walls were cleaned through an arduous process. Other modifications included a complete overhaul of the superstructure and a replacement of the mechanical departures board with an electronic one.

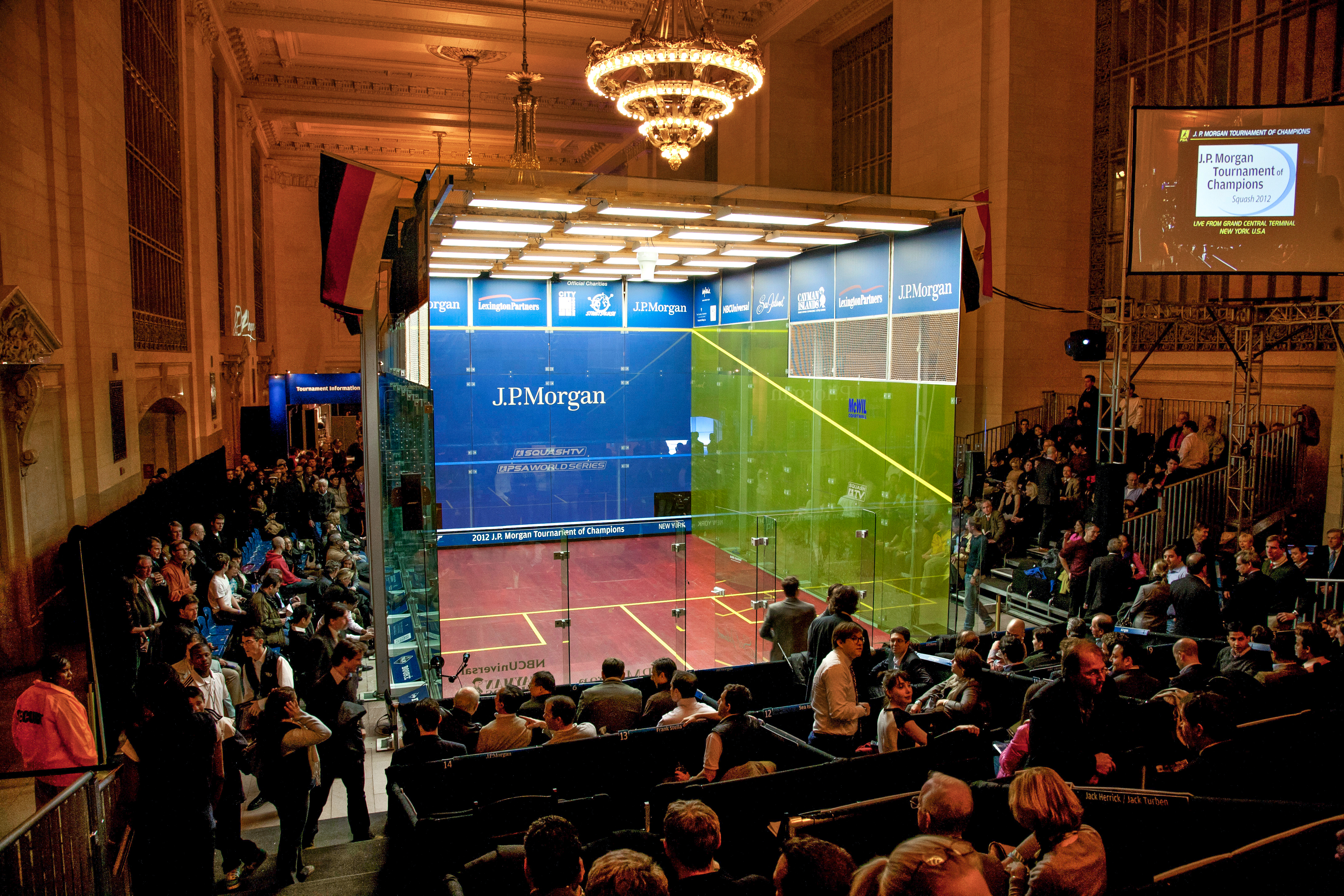
The Tournament of Champions squash championship in 2012

The project involved cleaning the facade, rooftop light courts, and statues; filling in cracks; repointing stones on the facade; restoring the copper roof and the building's cornice; repairing the large windows of the Main Concourse; and removing the remaining blackout paint on the windows. A 4,000-pound (1,800 kg) cast-iron eagle from the facade of the former Grand Central Depot, which had ended up at a house in Bronxville, New York, was donated back to Grand Central Terminal and installed above a new entrance on Lexington Avenue. The renovation also nearly doubled the terminal's retail space, from 105,000 square feet (9,800 m^{2}) to 170,000 (16,000). Aesthetic standards were important in the renovation, which involved returning the terminal's interior to its appearance in 1913. This included removal of a twelve-foot-long neon sign for the Grand Central Oyster Bar, put in place two weeks prior to replace a similar sign that had been installed there from 1974 to 1997.

An official re-dedication ceremony was held on October 1, 1998, marking the completion of the interior renovations. The cost of the project had ballooned to $196 million. The New York Times lauded the restoration effort, though it criticized the MTA's plans to turn the terminal into a mall of shops and restaurants, distracting visitors from the terminal's grandeur, and making it a large commercial enterprise. The Grand Central North passageways opened on August 18, 1999, at a final cost of $75 million. Some of the minor refits, such as the replacement of the train information displays at the entrances to each platform, were not completed until 2000. The final cost of $250 million was funded by the federal government, the MTA, the Grand Central Partnership, and bond issues.

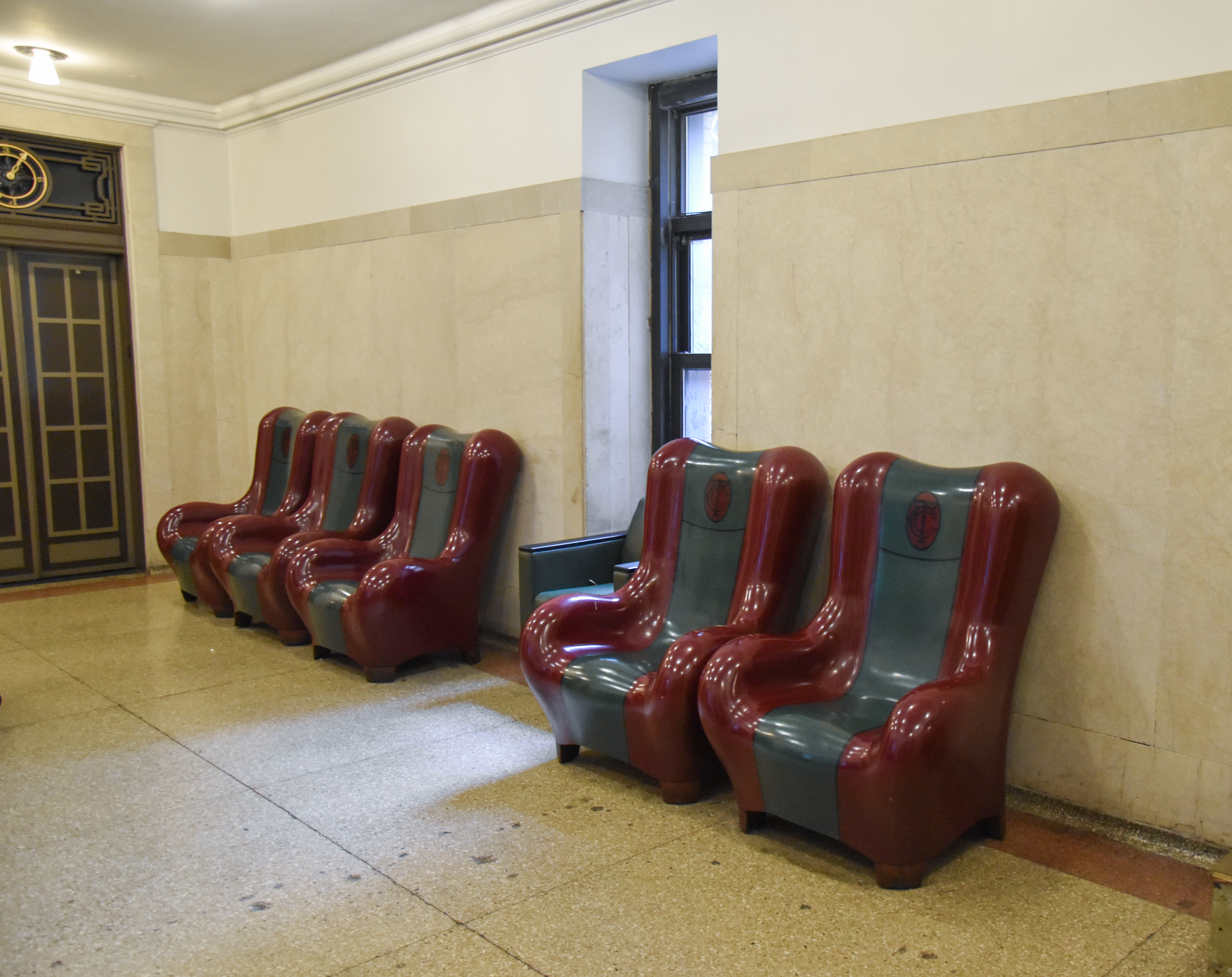
Five of the fiberglass chairs, located near the Vanderbilt Tennis Club entrance

In 1998, upon completion of the renovation, the MTA installed several oversize armchairs in the Dining Concourse to draw in crowds and encourage them to stay and eat there. The chairs were made from a fiberglass resin, and resembled the plush wing chairs that were on the 20th Century Limited, one of the most famous trains to utilize Grand Central. The chairs were removed in 2011 to improve passenger circulation in the concourse, as they became too frequently used by tourists taking photos. The chairs were subsequently moved to the terminal's employee lounges.

Since 1999, the terminal's Vanderbilt Hall has hosted the international Tournament of Champions squash championship annually. The event involves installation of a 21 x 32-foot free-standing theatre in the round, made of glass, with spectators sitting on three sides around it.

== 21st century ==
=== 2000s and early 2010s ===
In 2001, the September 11 attacks that destroyed the World Trade Center complex, also in Manhattan, led to increased security in Grand Central and other transit hubs across the city. The Joint Task Force Empire Shield (personnel from the New York National Guard) has since maintained a constant presence in the terminal. Shortly after the attacks, the MTA ordered two American flags to be hung in the terminal's Main Concourse, including a 20 x 40 ft. flag hung from the ceiling in the center of the room.

By 2010, the station house was undergoing a 5-year project to replace its flooring, which was scheduled to be completed in 2012. This included 45,000 square feet (4,200 m^{2}) of marble tile and an additional 65,000 square feet (6,000 m^{2}) of terrazzo. Obtaining the matching marble required reopening the Tennessee quarry where the original marble was cut from.

In 2011, one of the fine dining restaurants in the terminal, Charlie Palmer's Metrazur, closed. The restaurant, named after a French train line, was soon replaced by an Apple store.

=== Centennial and improvements ===
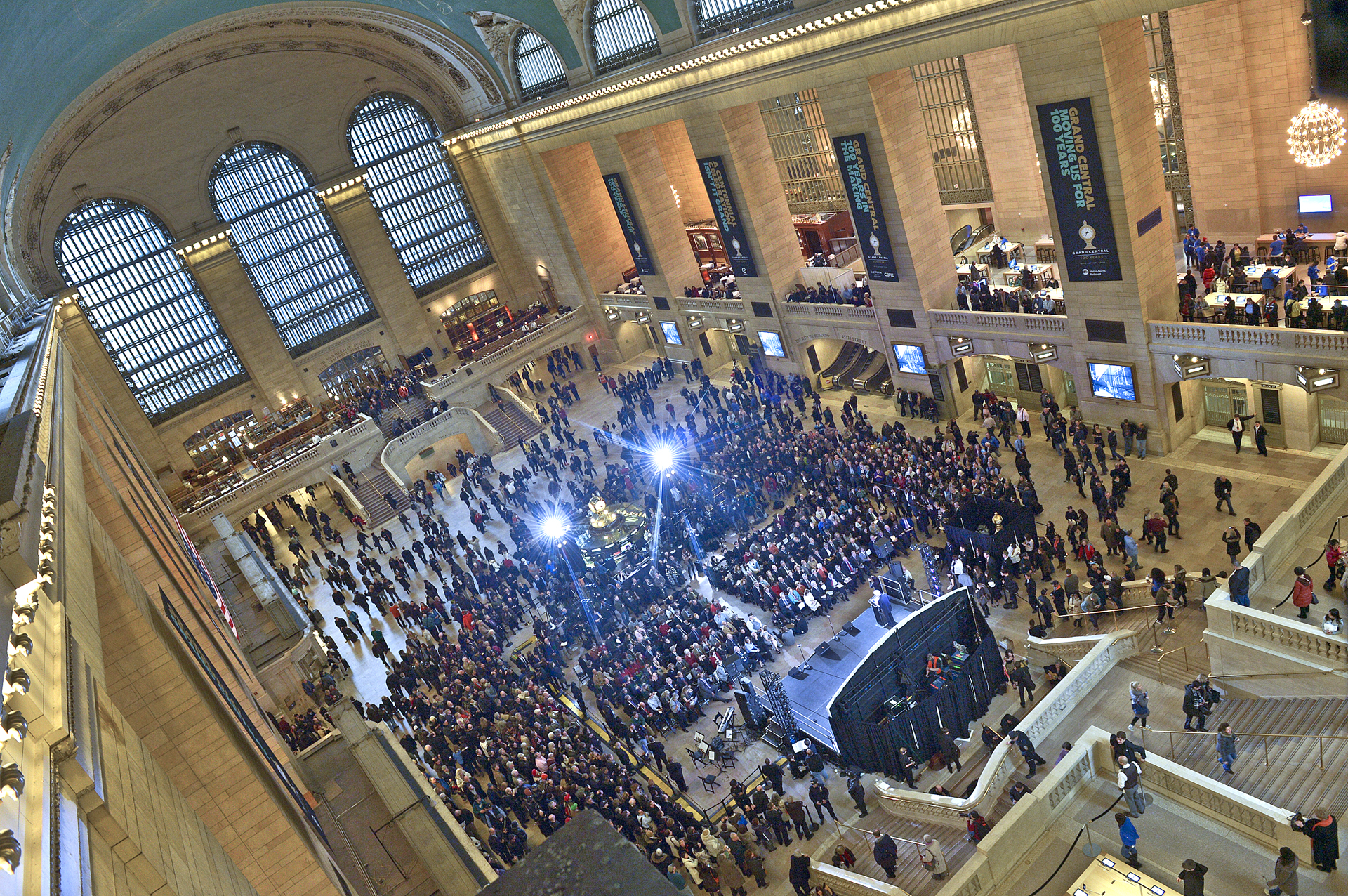
Centennial celebration performance, 2013

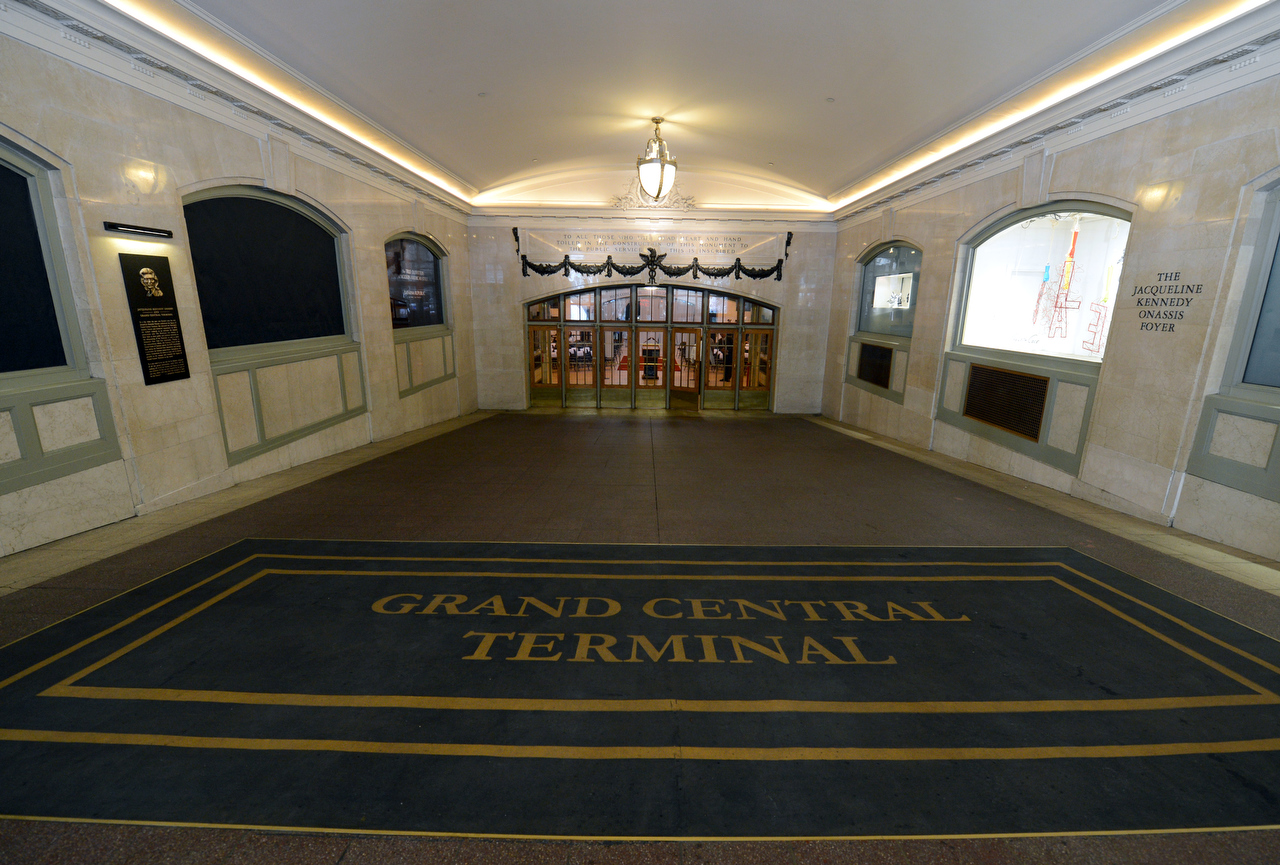
Foyer at the 42nd Street entrance, dedicated to Jacqueline Kennedy Onassis in 2014

On February 1, 2013, the terminal celebrated its centennial with a rededication ceremony and numerous displays, performances, and events. On that day, the American Society of Civil Engineers gave the terminal recognition as a Historic Civil Engineering Landmark. The New York Transit Museum exhibited Grand by Design, a history of the terminal, in the structure's Vanderbilt Hall. It was displayed there from February 1 to March 15, 2013, and subsequently at the Riverfront Library in Yonkers, New York from January 11 to March 17, 2014. Grand Central also became a sister station with Tokyo Station in Japan, in a similar agreement to those of sister cities. The agreement commemorated the two stations' centennials and recognized both as historic landmarks with important social and economic roles. Later in the year, Grand Central became a sister station of the Hsinchu railway station in Taiwan, a Baroque-inspired building that also opened in 1913.

The main entrance foyer on 42nd Street was renamed after former U.S. first lady Jacqueline Kennedy Onassis on June 30, 2014, following a renovation. Also in 2014, following the rezoning of East Midtown, the One Vanderbilt supertall skyscraper was proposed for a site to the west of Grand Central Terminal, across Vanderbilt Avenue. The building, constructed from 2016 to 2020, has a transit hall at its base, underground access to Grand Central, and a pedestrian plaza between the skyscraper and terminal. Another improvement project near Grand Central Terminal, the replacement of the Grand Hyatt New York hotel, was announced in 2019. The structure would be torn down and replaced with a 2-million-square-foot (190,000 m^{2}) mixed-use structure with office and retail space, as well as a smaller hotel.

In December 2017, the MTA awarded contracts to replace the display boards and public announcement systems and add security cameras at Grand Central Terminal and 20 other Metro-North stations in New York state. The next-train departure time screens will be replaced with LED signs.

As part of the 2020–2024 MTA Capital Program, the Grand Central Terminal train shed's concrete and steel will be repaired. The work will tear up portions of Park Avenue and adjacent side streets for several years. The project would start in 2021 or 2022 and cost $250 million. Since trains will continue to run during the project, the MTA will conduct a pilot renovation of Park Avenue between 53rd and 55th streets.

=== Long Island Rail Road access ===
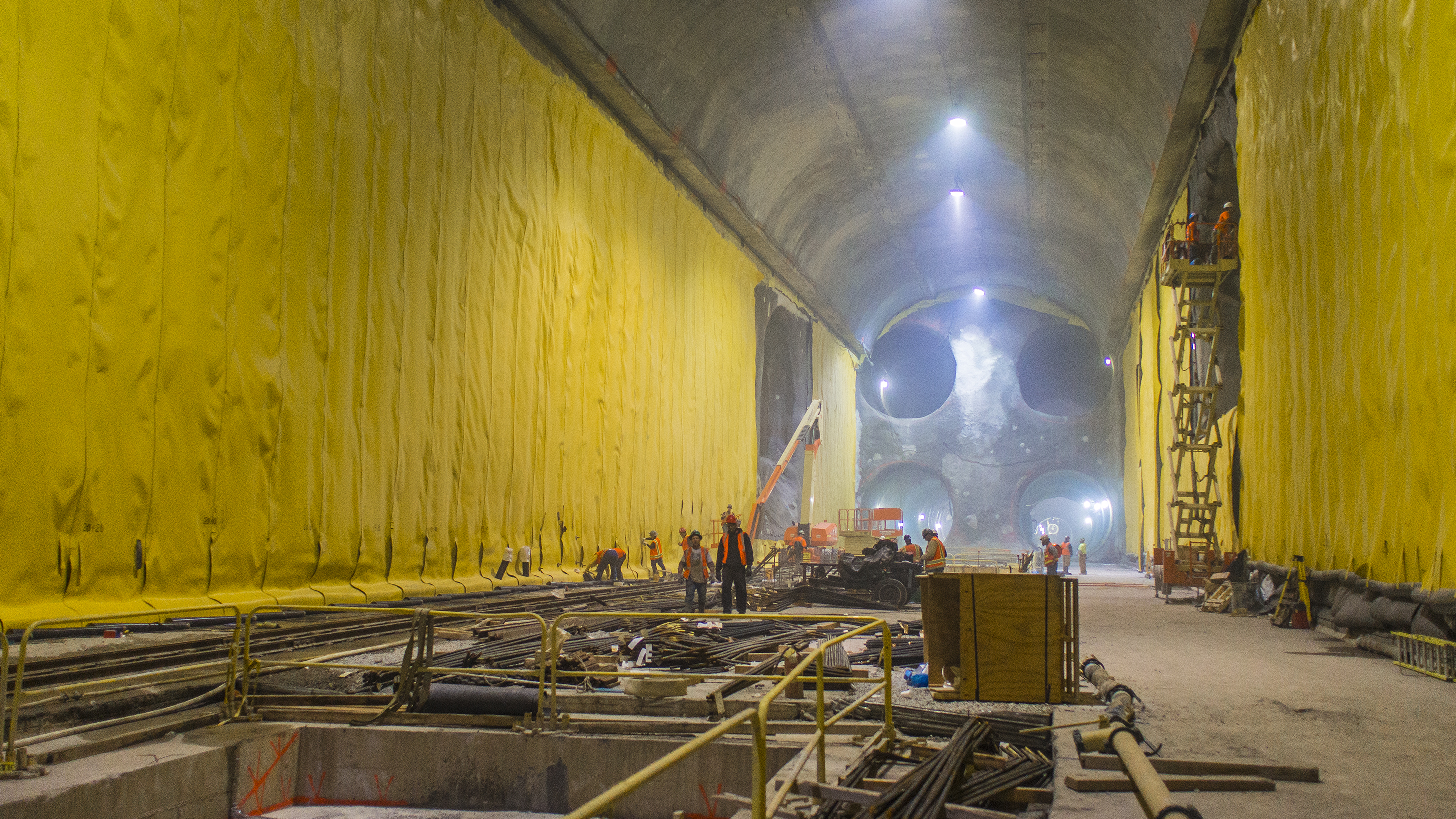
East Side Access progress in 2014

Work on the East Side Access project, which brought Long Island Rail Road trains into the Grand Central Madison station under the existing terminal, started in 2007. LIRR trains reach Grand Central from Harold Interlocking in Sunnyside, Queens, via the existing 63rd Street Tunnel and new tunnels on both the Manhattan and Queens sides. LIRR trains arrive and depart from a bi-level, eight-track tunnel with four platforms that will sit more than 140 feet (43 m) below Park Avenue and more than 90 feet (27 m) below the Metro-North tracks. Reaching the street from the lowest new level, more than 175 feet (53 m) deep, will take about 10 minutes. A new 350,000-square-foot retail and dining concourse is accessed via stairwells, 22 elevators, and 47 escalators connecting to Grand Central's existing food court. The MTA also planned and built new entrances at 45th, 46th, and 48th streets.

The first proposals for Long Island Rail Road trains entering the east side of Manhattan date to 1963. In 1968, the 63rd Street Tunnel and a new "Metropolitan Transportation Center" at 48th Street and Third Avenue were proposed for the LIRR as part of the Program for Action. After people living near the proposed transportation center objected, the MTA's board of directors voted to use Grand Central as the terminal for the proposed LIRR route in 1977. However, due to the 1975 New York City fiscal crisis, the LIRR project was postponed indefinitely before the 63rd Street Tunnel could be completed.

The East Side Access project was restarted after a study in the 1990s that showed that more than half of LIRR riders work closer to Grand Central than to the current terminus at Penn Station. Cost estimates jumped from $4.4 billion in 2004, to $6.4 billion in 2006, then to $11.1 billion. The new Grand Central Madison station and its tunnels opened on January 25, 2023.

=== Purchase by the MTA ===
Midtown Trackage Ventures, LLC, an investment group controlled by Argent Ventures, purchased the station from American Financial in December 2006. As part of the transaction the lease with the MTA was renegotiated through February 28, 2274. The MTA paid $2.4 million annually in rent in 2007 and had an option to buy the station and tracks in 2017, although Argent could extend the date another 15 years to 2032.

In November 2018, the MTA proposed purchasing the Hudson and Harlem Lines as well as the Grand Central Terminal for up to $35.065 million from Midtown Trackage Ventures, opting out of the 280-year lease with that company. The purchase price is equal to all the $2.4 million rent payments the MTA has been paying and would have continued to pay, discounted to their present value via a discount rate of 6.25%. The seller further reduced the purchase price by a $500,000 cash discount. The purchase would include all inventory, operations, improvements, and maintenance associated with each asset, except for the transferable air rights over Grand Central. At the time, the Hudson and Harlem Lines were owned by a holding company that had taken possession of Penn Central's assets upon its bankruptcy, while Grand Central Terminal was owned by Midtown Trackage Ventures. Under the terms of the leases for each asset, the MTA would only be able to exercise an option to purchase the three assets before October 2019. The MTA wanted to purchase the assets in order to avoid future double-payments on its existing leases for these assets. If the option were exercised, the closing of the sale was not proposed to occur until at least April 2020. The MTA's finance committee approved the proposed purchase on November 13, 2018, and the full board approved the proposal two days later. The deal finally closed on February 28, 2020, with the MTA taking ownership of the terminal and rail lines, and with the final purchase price for the terminal at $33 million.

=== Late 2010s to present ===
In 2017 and 2018, the terminal planned to replace several of its longstanding foodservice tenants with more upscale eateries. MTA officials said they were willing to take lower rents in order to move trendier businesses into its retail spaces. One of the new operations is Art Bird, which is co-owned by chef Art Smith and Joseph Germanotta, father of musician Lady Gaga. Art Bird replaced Dishes, a grab-and-go business. Another is Prova Pizzabar, owned by restaurateur Donatella Arpaia, which replaced a Two Boots location.

In September 2019, the MTA board approved its 2020–2024 Capital Program, which includes $348.8 million to repair the Grand Central Terminal train shed. The train shed project will be completed in multiple stages and will be completed in future capital programs. During the first part of the train shed project, the first section of train shed will be replaced and design work will be completed for the next part. The train shed repairs will address the deterioration of the train shed's roof and its support due to the intrusion of water and salt from Park Avenue. The Park Avenue Tunnel project will construct four new emergency exits in two locations. As part of the train shed project, about 650,000 square feet (60,000 m^{2}) of the roof would be replaced; this involved replacing the roadways and sidewalks above the train shed. By 2024, the cost of the train shed replacement had increased to $1.7 billion.

In 2020, Art Bird refused to pay rent to the MTA, complaining about the increasing use of the dining concourse by the city's homeless population. In response, the MTA threatened to evict the restaurant just as the COVID-19 pandemic was beginning to affect New York City. Another tenant, the Campbell, objected to the MTA's refusal to alter the bar's $1 million annual rent agreement while the agency was requesting a $4 billion bailout. As the outbreak became a pandemic and the state was put on lockdown, ridership declined, and the terminal was reported by The New York Times and other sources to be one of many typically busy locations in the city that had become nearly empty. A cartoon of the terminal's empty Main Concourse by Eric Drooker was the cover of The New Yorker's March 30 issue. In July 2020, the Great Northern Food Hall closed permanently; its space was leased in April 2022 to City Winery, which in September 2024 was replaced by a 400-seat restaurant called Grand Brasserie.

== Events and exhibitions ==
Special events and exhibits at Grand Central Terminal have included:

- In 1916, plans for then-controversial improvements to Riverside Park were displayed at Grand Central.
- In 1918, the American Museum of Natural History and New York State Food Commission hosted an exhibit about food conservation and the "ideal diet" in the eastern gallery.
- In December 1931, a 12.5-foot-long (3.8 m) model of a completed Cathedral of St. John the Divine was placed on the north balcony. At the time, the cathedral had been under construction for close to four decades.
- In October 1934, one thousand photos of various Depression-era improvement projects were displayed at the terminal.
- From 1935 to 1936, an exhibit of tourist attractions in New York state, sponsored by the state government, was held on the east balcony.
- The Kodak Photographic Information Center had a dedicated spot on the east balcony through the 1950s and 1960s. The center was erected in conjunction with the Kodak Colorama gallery that was displayed prominently in the Main Concourse from 1950 until 1990.
- In 1955, a 22-foot-long (6.7 m) model of the USS Shangri-La, an aircraft carrier, was displayed in the Main Concourse.
- In May 1958, an 18-foot-long (5.5 m) model of the Sergeant missile was displayed in the terminal.
- In 1988, a Double Dutch jump-roping competition was held in the Main Concourse as part of a city-sponsored "Summer Games".

== Incidents ==
In 2015, the terminal banned protests known as die-ins, which were taking place there in reaction to police brutality. Among those arrested in the protests was the activist Reverend Billy. In the same year, the terminal was also host to several Black Lives Matter protests. Freedom of Information Act requests showed that MTA Police and undercover officers were monitoring and photographing the protesters there illegally.

The Metropolitan Transportation Authority Police Department's actions within the terminal have received significant attention in the media, including a 1988 scandal involving seven officers behaving inappropriately in the terminal, including harassing a homeless man and patrolling the terminal unclothed. The department also arrested and harassed two transgender individuals, Dean Spade in 2002, and Helena Stone in 2006. Both were denied access to restrooms aligning with their gender identities; after lawsuits the MTA dropped its charges and changed its policy to allow use of restrooms according to gender identity. In 2017, an MTA police officer assaulted and arrested a conductor who was removing a passenger from a train in the terminal.
