= Grand Central Tower =

Unbuilt building in New York City

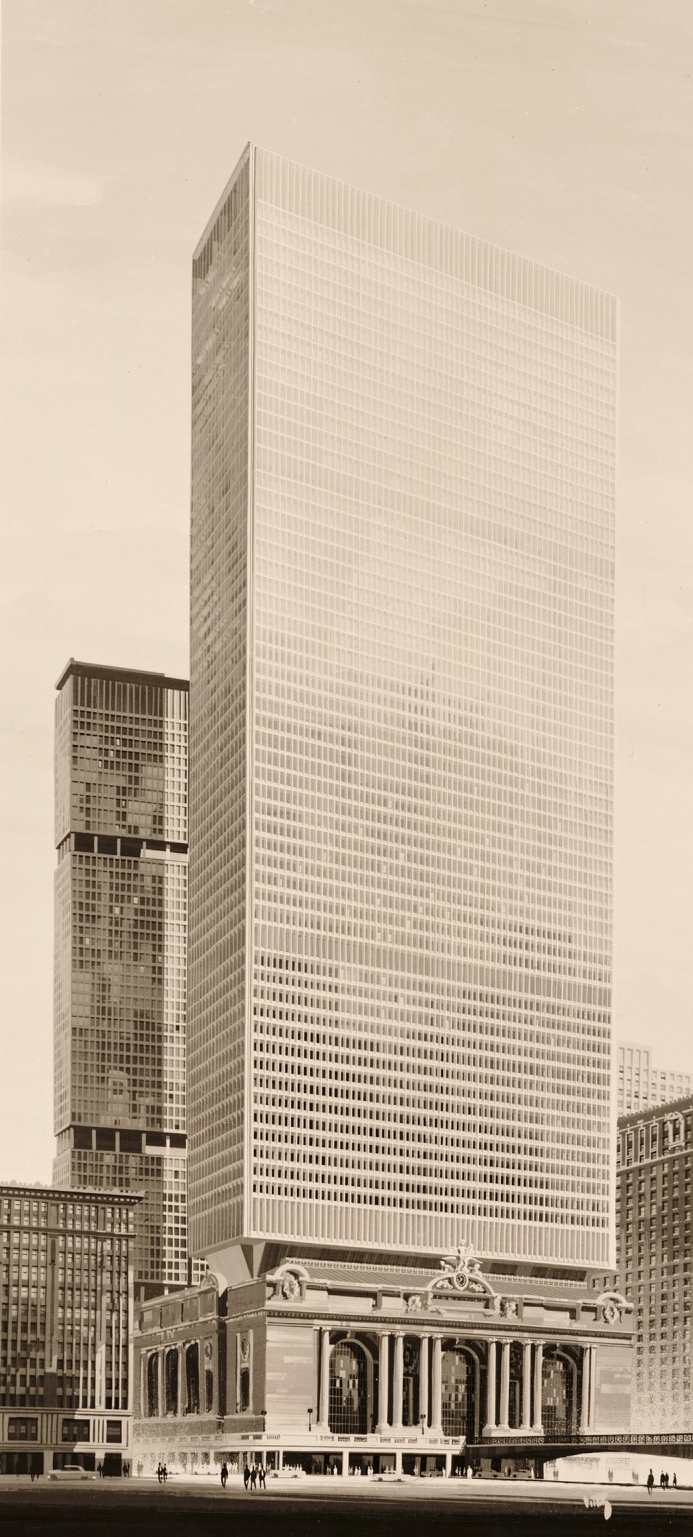
- A proposed design by Marcel Breuer
- Interactive map of the Grand Central Tower area
- Alternative names: 175 Park Avenue

General information
- Status: Never built
- Location: Atop Grand Central Terminal, Park Avenue, Manhattan, New York City, US
- Coordinates: 40°45′9.5″N 73°58′38.5″W

Height
- Height: 1,600 feet (490 m) (Pei proposal); 950 feet (290 m) (Breuer proposal)

Design and construction
- Architects: Fellheimer & Wagner (1954 proposal); I. M. Pei (1954–1956 proposals); Marcel Breuer (1968–1969 proposal)

Grand Central Tower (also known as 175 Park Avenue) was a scrapped plan for a skyscraper atop Grand Central Terminal in Manhattan, New York City, United States. The skyscraper was first proposed in 1954 by the terminal's owner, New York Central Railroad, which wished to sell the site or its air rights in response to financial shortfalls. Penn Central, a later owner of Grand Central, put forth a separate plan for a skyscraper in 1968. Due to public opposition, neither plan was built.

The 1954 plan included two competing proposals for the replacement of Grand Central Terminal: one by I. M. Pei and another by Fellheimer & Wagner. Pei's original plan called for an 80-story tower, which would have been the world's tallest building, while Wagner's proposal called for a 55-story H-shaped structure. Though Wagner's proposal did not proceed, Pei modified his plans in 1956, creating a hyperboloid-shaped tower with an hourglass-shaped elevation, for which plans were never published. The neighboring Pan Am Building was approved in 1958 because it was located behind, rather than above, the terminal; it was completed in 1963.

The 1968 proposal was designed by Marcel Breuer and would have been 950 feet (290 m) tall. The plan itself drew major opposition from the public and architects, as it would have resulted in the destruction of the terminal. Opponents, including former U.S. first lady Jacqueline Kennedy Onassis and the architecture critics Emily Genauer and Wolf Von Eckardt, criticized both its architecture and its symbolism. Breuer modified his plan in 1969, but the New York City Landmarks Preservation Commission rejected both proposals, since the existing building was a designated city landmark. The rejections prompted a decade-long legal battle; the Supreme Court of the United States ruled in favor of the city in Penn Central Transportation Co. v. New York City, preventing the tower's construction.

== 1950s plans ==
=== Background ===
Grand Central Terminal, the New York Central Railroad's main terminal in New York City, was designed by Reed & Stem and Warren & Wetmore; it was completed in 1913. Proposals for a skyscraper had existed since even before the terminal opened. As part of the construction of Grand Central Terminal, the station's architects had proposed a 23-story tower set back from the sidewalk on 42nd Street, which would run outside the terminal's entrance. The 219-by-294-foot (67 by 90 m) structure, with doughnut-shaped floor plans surrounding an internal light court, was to have been accessed from the corners of the terminal's Main Concourse. The tower was excluded from the final plans, and the Main Concourse's eastern staircase (proposed as part of the office tower) was not built as a result.

The station's decline came after World War II, with the beginning of the Jet Age and the construction of the Interstate Highway System. With passenger volumes at Grand Central Terminal having declined dramatically from the early 20th century, there were proposals to demolish and replace the station. Vehicular traffic around Grand Central Terminal also increased in the late 1950s. At the same time, the New York, New Haven and Hartford Railroad retained a partial interest in the terminal's operation. Under the city's zoning, sites were assigned a certain amount of air rights or development rights, which dictated how much floor area was allowed for a building on that lot. The site had a large amount of unused air rights that could be used to develop a substantially larger structure. The New York Central was paying taxes on the building's unused air rights, and the company wanted to sell the property or its air rights to allow the construction of a skyscraper there. Further, while early proposals for buildings in the Terminal City area generally complemented the original design, later proposals called for replacing the terminal entirely.

=== Competing proposals ===
Initially, New York Central's chairman Robert R. Young had been negotiating with developer Erwin S. Wolfson and their mutual friends Herbert and Stuart Scheftel to determine how the Grand Central site could be redeveloped. After these discussions broke down, two competing plans for the replacement of Grand Central Terminal were proposed in 1954: one by I. M. Pei and another by Fellheimer & Wagner. The proposals were publicized that September. The New York Times's editorial board wrote that, although the terminal was valuable because it provided convenient rail connections to suburban communities, the land was a prime candidate for redevelopment for that very reason.

Pei's proposal, revealed on September 7, 1954, was suggested by Young and developer William Zeckendorf. The proposal called for an 80-story, 5-million-square-foot (460,000 m^{2}) tower spanning a footprint of 275 by 275 feet (84 by 84 m). With an advertised height of 1,600 feet (490 m)—composed of a 1,000-foot (300 m) office section and a 600-foot (180 m) observation tower—it would have become the world's tallest building. The New York Herald Tribune wrote that the building would have had a glass elevator on its side.

Fellheimer & Wagner's proposal was announced on September 17, 1954, on the suggestion of New Haven Railroad president Patrick McGinnis and developer Erwin S. Wolfson. Fellheimer & Wagner's lead architect, Alfred T. Fellheimer, had supervised the design of Grand Central Terminal forty years earlier. Fellheimer viewed the terminal as a "Chinese wall" blocking the path of Park Avenue, 43rd Street, and 44th Street, and creating traffic jams and heavy pedestrian traffic. The building was to be composed of an H-shaped tower and six shorter structures, roughly twice the width of Pei's proposed tower. Two wings were to extend north and south of the crossbar of the "H". There was to be retail on the lower levels and a helipad near the roof. In addition, the building was to have a 2,400-space parking garage, and 43rd and 44th streets were to continue under the building at ground level. Rising 55 stories and spanning at least 4 million square feet (370,000 m^{2}), it was advertised as the world's largest office building; however, Chicago's Merchandise Mart had just over 4 million square feet, while the Pentagon had 6.2 million square feet (580,000 m^{2}). Fellheimer's plan would have included a rooftop helipad, restaurants and shops, and 2,400 parking spots. It would have 43rd and 44th streets cross through the building, straighten the route of the Park Avenue Viaduct directly through the building, and open Depew Place to the public.

=== Reaction and cancellation ===
The plans by Fellheimer & Wagner and I. M. Pei prompted Architectural Forum magazine to publish an editorial endorsing the preservation of Grand Central's Main Concourse. Architectural Forum also wrote to hundreds of prominent architects and urban planners, asking them to support the terminal's preservation. The directors of the two railroads received 235 letters, most of which urged the railroads to save the terminal. Notable detractors included Fellheimer; Marcel Breuer and Minoru Yamasaki, both of whom consulted for the New Haven Railroad; and George Howe, a modernist. A 65-story tower called Grand Central City, just north of the terminal, was proposed in February 1955. This proposal was forgotten the next month, when Zeckendorf was named the partner for any new development in the vicinity of Grand Central, including further planning for a skyscraper adjacent to or above Grand Central Terminal.

Zeckendorf and Pei's modified plans, which were never publicized, were completed in 1956. Unpublished drawings indicate that Pei's second design was supposed to be a tower shaped like a hyperboloid. This structure would have had a circular floor plan that tapered toward the middle and widened at the top and bottom, creating an hourglass-shaped elevation. The floors would have ranged in width from 200 feet (61 m) at its base to 100 feet (30 m) at the center. The facade itself would have consisted of a lattice of diagonal support beams. At the base, the building reportedly would have been sturdy enough to survive a nuclear bomb. Although Pei later said that he had no memory of drawing up the hyperboloid plans, he did remember details of the plans themselves. In a 2010 video, he recalled having tried to persuade urban planner Robert Moses to construct the hyperboloid, but to no avail.

Neither Pei's nor Fellheimer's designs were ultimately carried out. Pei's hyperboloid tower faced extensive criticism from both professionals and the general public, and its most avid supporter, Robert Young, killed himself in 1958. The railroads faced significant financial shortfalls, and the economy as a whole had started to decline, leaving Zeckendorf unable to finance the project. Details of the hyperboloid plan were presented in a 2024 retrospective of Pei's work.

== Pan Am Building and continued threats ==
A design for a 50-story Grand Central City tower was announced in 1958. That structure, built to the north of the terminal, was approved because it did not involve modifying the terminal building itself. The Grand Central City project, which became known as the Pan Am Building, was completed in 1963.

New York Central continued to decline, and in 1968 it merged with the Pennsylvania Railroad to form the Penn Central Railroad. The Pennsylvania Railroad had started demolishing Penn Station's original station building in 1963, replaced by the current Pennsylvania Station and the Madison Square Garden above it. The demolition of Penn Station directly resulted in the creation of the New York City Landmarks Preservation Commission (LPC). The LPC designated Grand Central Terminal as a city landmark in August 1967; this designation initially applied only to the terminal's exterior. The landmark designation had been granted in part because of the opposition to the 1950s skyscraper plans. Even though the public generally saw the Main Concourse as more significant, it did not receive landmark status until 1980.

In September 1967, New York Central proposed constructing a 45-story building directly above the Main Concourse, spanning 2 million square feet (190,000 m^{2}). This building required approval from the LPC and from the New York City Planning Commission due to its impact on the terminal's esthetics, natural light exposure, and pedestrian circulation. New York Central solicited bids for the project for one month. Architects such as Max O. Urbahn and Pan Am Building co-designer Richard Roth opposed the plans, as did modernist architect Philip Johnson, who said he was ethically disinclined to design the tower given his role in the Grand Central preservation movement. Several construction firms also reportedly refused to bid on the plans, citing the difficulty of constructing a skyscraper on that site in a cost-effective manner.

== Breuer plans ==
=== Original plan ===
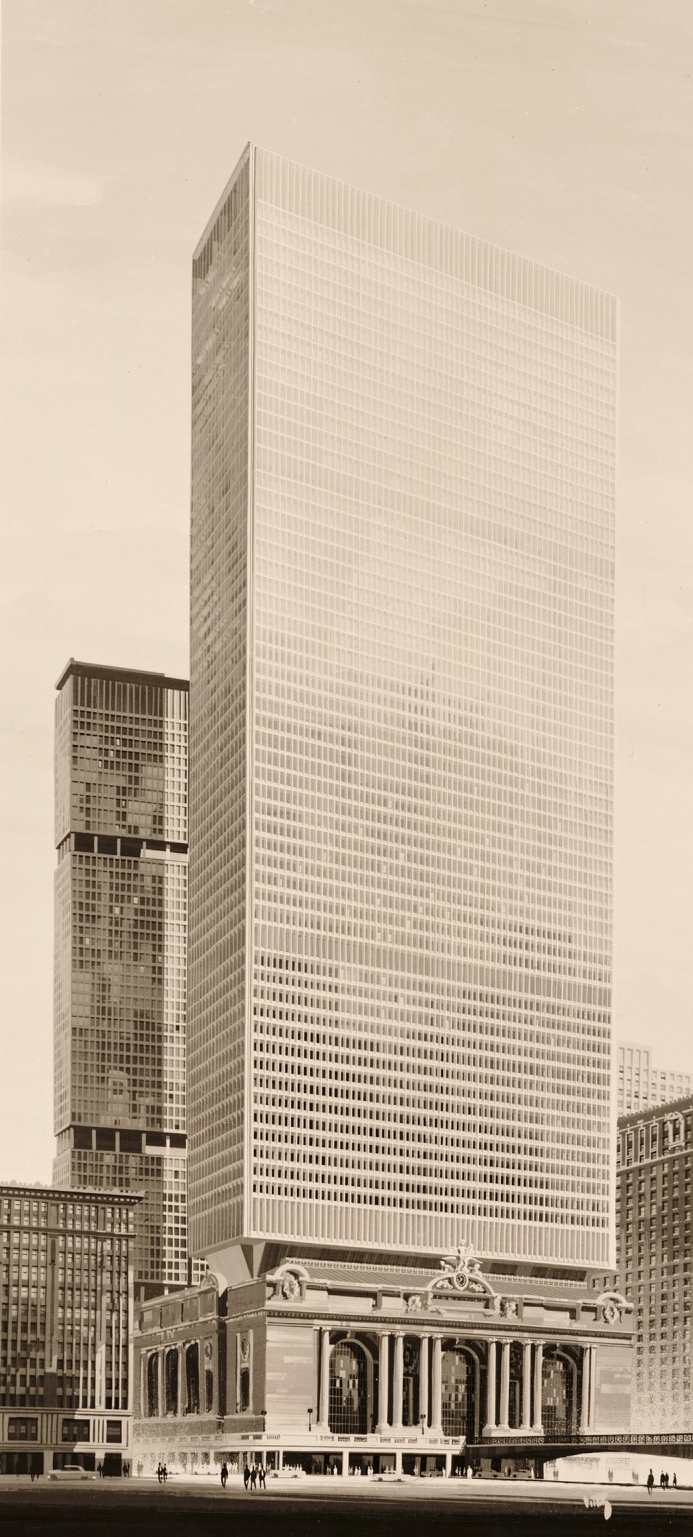
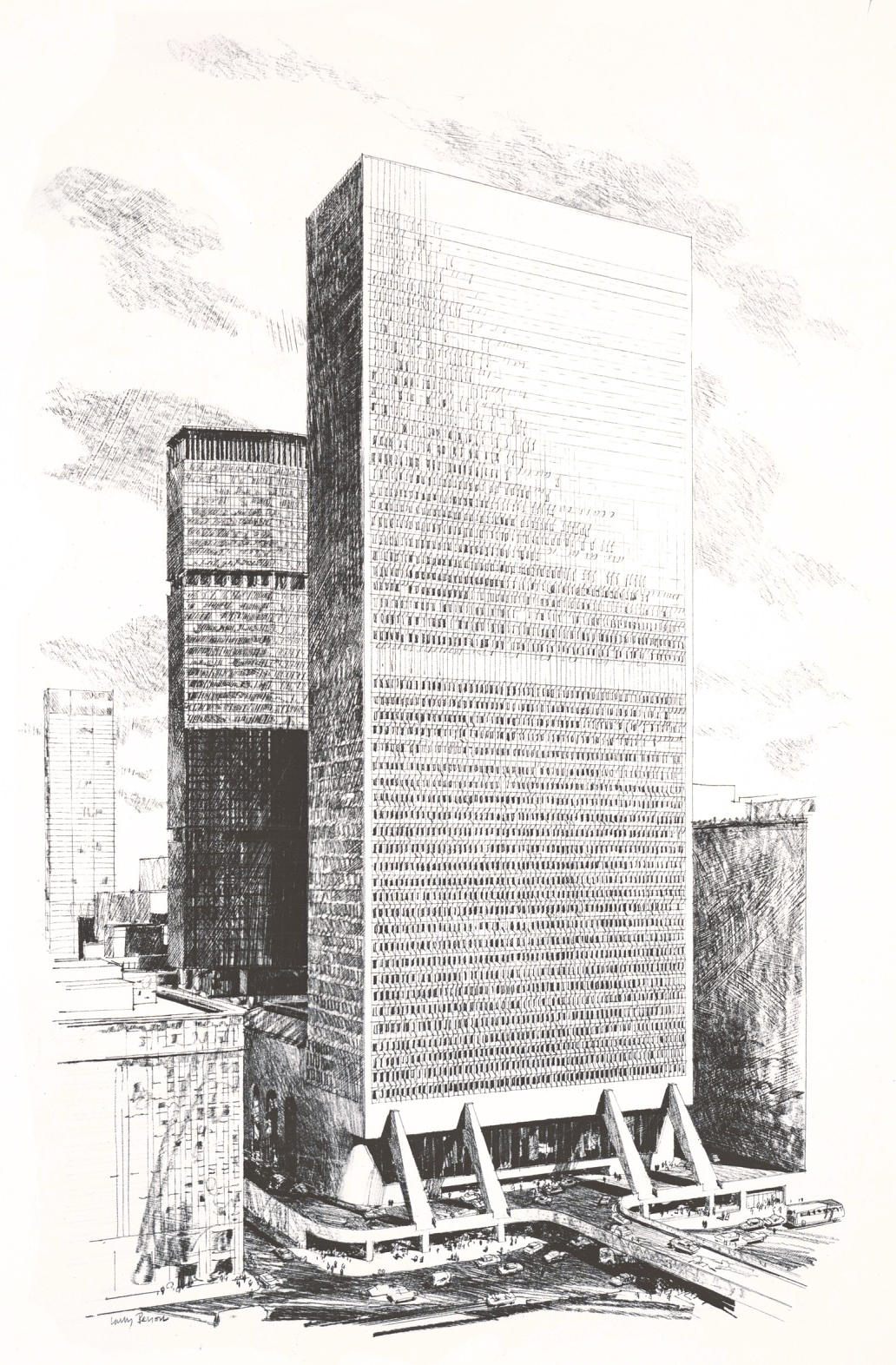
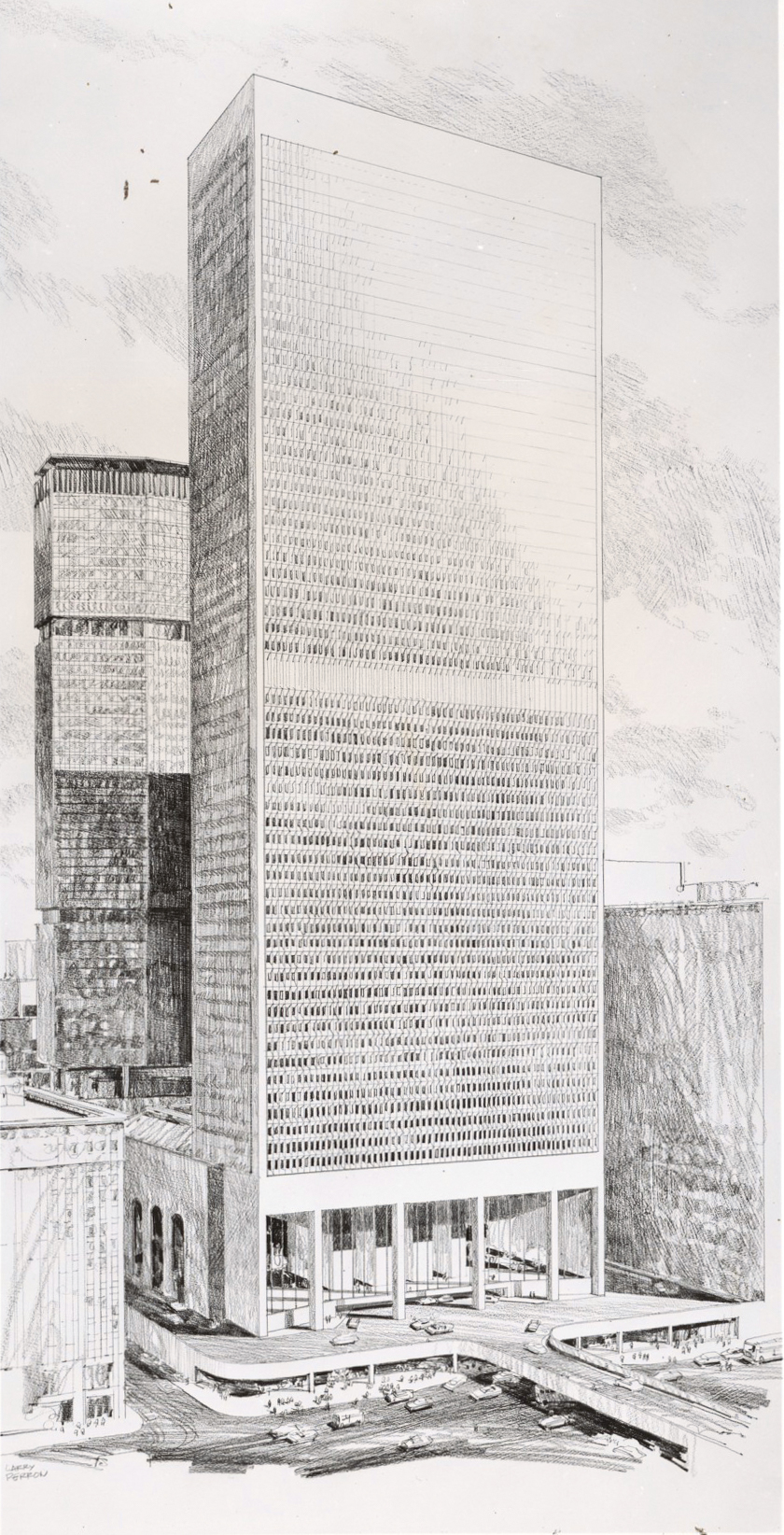
Marcel Breuer proposals included variations keeping the 1913 facade and demolishing it.

Morris Saady, head of development firm Union General Properties (UGP), acquired the terminal's air rights in January 1968, signing a 50-year lease at an annual rate of at least $3 million. Saady hired Marcel Breuer the next month to design a skyscraper there. Breuer said he waited a week before accepting the job, and he agreed to take the commission only if the building were "of superior materials and quality design", as architecture writer Ada Louise Huxtable described it. Progressive Architecture magazine speculated that Breuer had accepted the commission because Walter Gropius, his former Bauhaus colleague, had designed the adjacent Pan Am Building. The project was also to involve general contractor Diesel Construction Company, structural engineer James Ruderman, and mechanical engineering firm Jaros, Baum & Bolles. Marcel Breuer Associates' archives refer to this project as 175 Park Avenue.

Further details of the plan, later known as Breuer I, were announced on June 19, 1968. With a proposed height of 950 feet (290 m), the tower would have stood 150 feet (46 m) taller than the Pan Am Building, and its footprint would have measured 309 by 152 feet (94 by 46 m), spanning the Main Concourse's width. The facade would have been clad in stone, the same material used on the existing terminal, and would have been divided into three sections. The tower would have begun some 160 feet (49 m) or 188 feet (57 m) above ground, over the Main Concourse's ceiling. Four huge trusses would have carried the tower over the concourse, and the office floors would have been cantilevered outward in all directions. A core with 52 elevators would have helped support the building,

Despite Breuer's stated intention of preserving the interior, the construction of the building's lobby would have required demolishing the terminal's waiting room. Improvements to adjacent sidewalks, the terminal itself, and the New York City Subway's Grand Central–42nd Street station were also proposed. In total, the structure was to have 1.9 million square feet (180,000 m^{2}) or 2 million square feet (190,000 m^{2}) of space. If it were approved, it would have taken 30 months to construct.

==== Reactions ====
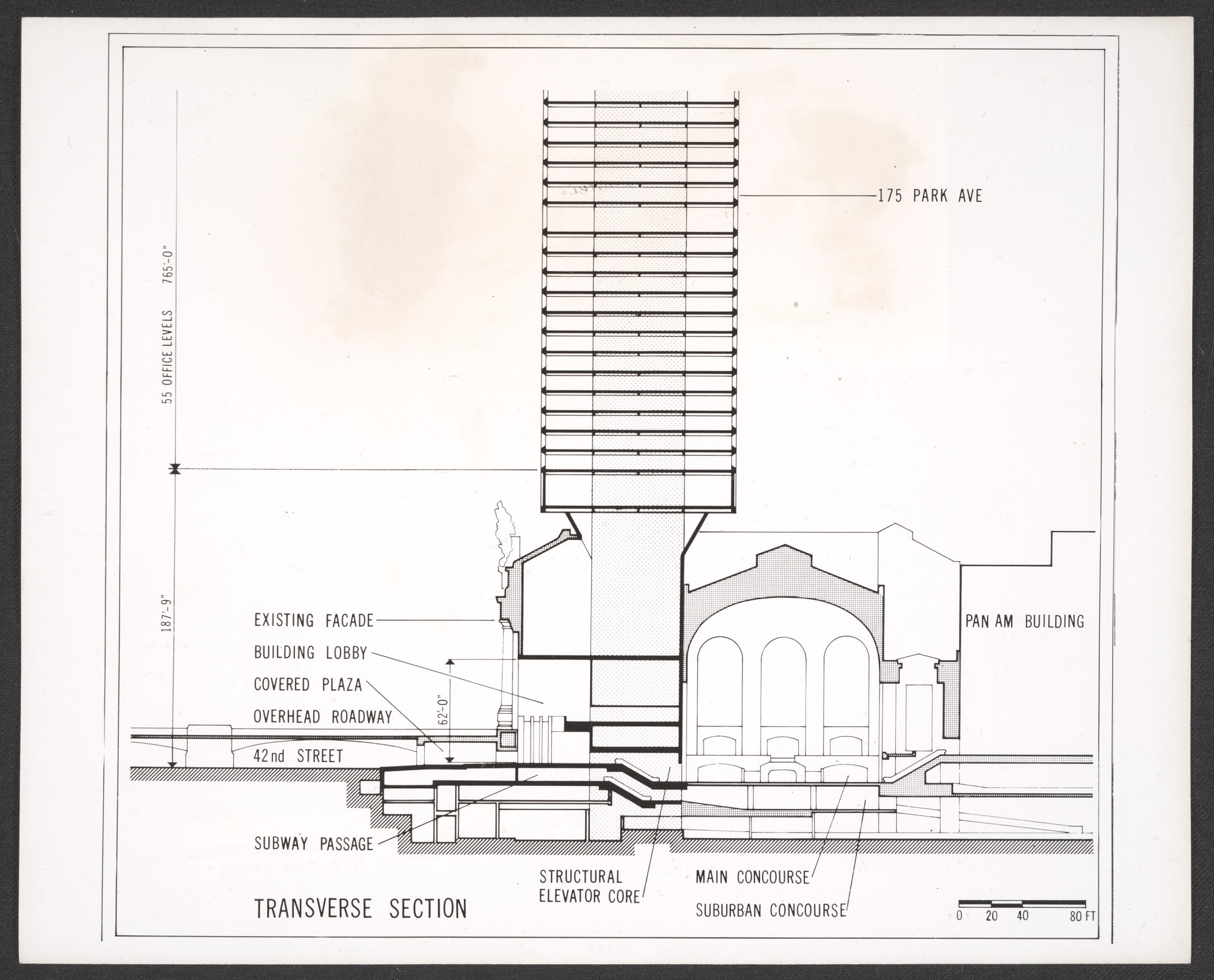
Cutaway drawing of the tower proposal to minimize impact on the terminal building

The plans drew huge opposition from the public, especially given the relative recency of Penn Station's destruction. The criticism largely targeted its location rather than its appearance; the New York City Planning Commission's chairman, Donald K. Elliott, called it "the wrong building at the wrong place at the wrong time". The critic Emily Genauer wrote that the skyscraper's very existence would be a defeat for urbanism and "a victory for real estate interests to whom human beings are for burrowing, not breathing", and Wolf Von Eckardt similarly said that the plans were part of a "childish insistence on making the city unlivable and unworkable for people" just for the sake of profit. Huxtable described the building as a "grotesquerie" and characterized the plans as "a truly remarkable shotgun wedding between sentiment and speculative economics". The Municipal Art Society also opposed construction, and Mayor John Lindsay's Urban Design Council advocated for the city government to stymie the plans by creating a special zoning district around the terminal. The Village Voice mocked the plans, publishing sketches of other city landmarks (such as City Hall and the New York Public Library Main Branch) beside other skyscrapers. Former U.S. first lady Jacqueline Kennedy Onassis stated:

Is it not cruel to let our city die by degrees, stripped of all her proud monuments, until there will be nothing left of all her history and beauty to inspire our children? If they are not inspired by the past of our city, where will they find the strength to fight for her future? Americans care about their past, but for short term gain they ignore it and tear down everything that matters. Maybe... this is the time to take a stand, to reverse the tide, so that we won't all end up in a uniform world of steel and glass boxes.

— Jacqueline Kennedy Onassis

Architecturally, Genauer said the design was not as overwhelming as that of the Pan Am Building or Breuer's earlier Whitney Museum building. Wolf Von Eckardt said the cantilevered structure showed Breuer's "technical genius" and that the design itself was no worse than the Pan Am Building or the World Trade Center. Huxtable said, "Mr. Breuer has done an excellent job with a dubious undertaking, which is like saying it would be great if it weren't awful", and that the terminal was vulnerable even without the tower, since Penn Central could request the terminal's demolition if maintaining it was an excessive financial hardship. Industrial Design wrote that the hiring of Breuer may have been intended to mollify opposition to a skyscraper above the terminal, given his high regard in architectural circles, although it said the tower would still "effectively destroy" the composition of the terminal's facade. Progressive Architecture suggested that the new development could be "made to work as well as Rockefeller Center" despite permanently altering the terminal's setting. Architectural writer Paul Spencer Byard said that Breuer had not intended to mock the terminal's design, but rather, aligned with Penn Central's commercial focus and Breuer's Bauhaus philosophy.

Some preservationists, including James Marston Fitch, did not take a stance on the tower's development because numerous architects had endorsed it. Many of Breuer's friends and peers opposed the project, and his plans had relatively few defenders. UGP and Penn Central, responding to criticism of the design, said that Breuer's tower had been intended to improve the site. In response to esthetic objections, Breuer said he had accepted the commission because he "thought it would be good for New York", and that the earlier Pan Am building had already ruined sightlines of Park Avenue. Breuer claimed that the terminal "appears doomed anyway" and that, without his plan, some other developer would propose an even less appealing design for a skyscraper there. The Wall Street Journal retrospectively wrote that Breuer had not conceived that there could be any opposition to the Grand Central Tower plans until someone had suggested putting a tower over his earlier Whitney Museum building.

=== Modified proposal ===
Saady requested city approval of the plans in July 1968, requesting a "certificate of no exterior effect" from the LPC. The agency rejected the first plan that September, saying that the tower visually modified the terminal's appearance. Commission members stated that the plan "would reduce the [terminal] to the status of a curiosity", regarding it as an "esthetic joke". (Note: Byard 1998, p. 83, quotes a different spelling of "aesthetic joke".) Breuer proposed a modified plan known as Breuer II. The plans called for a 59-story building that would replace the entire terminal except the Main Concourse, destroying the facade. Rising 830 feet (250 m), it was similar in appearance to many of Breuer's older prefabricated concrete structures. Breuer initially envisaged replacing the terminal's facade with square piers before suggesting a variant with sloped buttresses. At the rear, the building would have been supported by the existing terminal building's framework. Like the original plans, Breuer II involved improving access to the terminal and subway station.

The Breuer II plans were completed in March 1969 and presented to the LPC the next month. Although UGP's lawyers claimed it was illegal to prevent Penn Central from using their property as they saw fit, the revised plans were highly contentious, attracting both significant support and opposition. Supporters said that Penn Central reserved the right to lease the air rights as they wished, while opponents spoke out against any tower at the site. Elliott and Jaquelin T. Robertson proposed an alternative in which the air rights could be shifted to other nearby buildings. Huxtable wrote that Breuer II, while being "a far better and more sensible solution" than Breuer I, was still fundamentally flawed because of its location. Byard characterized the two proposals as "Machiavellian alternatives" that required, at the very least, demolishing either the exterior or the waiting room. I. M. Pei, who was a friend of Breuer's, did not support the revised design.

Penn Central modified the proposal in June 1969, decreasing the footprint of the proposed building and relocating it closer to the Pan Am Building. The LPC rejected the Breuer II plan that August, since, as Goldstone said, it would require demolishing a landmarked structure outright. Douglas Haskell of The Architectural Review retrospectively said that all of Breuer's plans had been thinly-veiled attempts to circumvent the landmark law by either lifting the tower "ridiculously into the air" or by preserving only the Main Concourse. Penn Central and UGP sued the city government the next month, claiming that they were being deprived of a combined $8 million per year. Anticipating that Penn Central would file a lawsuit over the city's landmarks law, the LPC offered to allow Penn Central to sell Grand Central's air rights. Penn Central initially agreed to this plan, since it was more interested in obtaining rental income. The railroad later reneged, refusing to release UGP from its contract to lease the air rights and cutting off negotiations with the city government.

=== Legal dispute ===
Penn Central sued the city again in October 1969, targeting the terminal's landmark designation in Penn Central Transportation Co. v. New York City and claiming that the designation violated the U.S. Constitution. The lawsuit continued for several years, during which Penn Central went bankrupt and UGP tried to buy the air rights outright. Although architectural societies, lawyers, and politicians supported the city's position, the city had limited resources to fight the lawsuit, especially during the 1975 New York City fiscal crisis. In January 1975, a justice for the New York Supreme Court invalidated the New York City landmark designation, theoretically allowing the tower's development to proceed. Major personalities and the public held rallies to prevent the demolition of the terminal, and the New York Supreme Court's decision was overturned by an appeals court that December.

The state's highest court, the New York Court of Appeals, ruled in June 1977 that the landmark law was constitutional and that Breuer's structure could not be built. The railroad appealed the decision to the Supreme Court of the United States. In June 1978, the Supreme Court ruled 6–3 in favor of the city, holding that the landmark law did not constitute a "taking" of Penn Central's property under the Constitution's Fifth Amendment. That final ruling allowed the city government to prevent the construction of any towers on the site, although it did not preclude a future demolition of the terminal. More broadly, the ruling turned Grand Central into a "kind of lodestone for landmarks preservation", as The New York Times described it, since the ruling helped spur preservation legislation in every U.S. state.

== Aftermath ==
Breuer had been a highly-regarded architect when he drew his plans, winning the AIA Gold Medal in 1968 even as his planned tower drew criticism during the same time. Even though Breuer had already designed numerous massively-scaled buildings such as IBM La Gaude and the Robert C. Weaver Federal Building, his reputation experienced a major decline in the aftermath of the Grand Central Tower controversy. The writer Robert McCarter stated that Breuer's firm turned to "increasingly repetitive and formulaic designs" in the years after Breuer designed the tower. Despite the backlash to Breuer's plans, some of its opponents later advocated for preserving Breuer's Whitney Museum building.

With the cancellation of the tower plans, Penn Central and its successors had 1.8 million square feet (170,000 m^{2}) of unused air rights above Grand Central Terminal and its rail yards. In ten years, they had managed to sell only 75,000 square feet (7,000 m^{2}). A plan to shift some of these air rights to the developer of 383 Madison Avenue was rejected in 1989. Mayor Michael Bloomberg proposed rezoning the area in 2012, allowing the air rights to be distributed more widely, but his plan was also rejected. The New York City Council passed the Midtown East rezoning in 2017, which finally allowed these air rights to be sold to developers of nearby buildings.

The firm of Gruzen & Partners considered reviving Reed & Stem's skyscraper proposal in 1980 before rejecting the proposal as infeasible. The restoration of Grand Central, originally envisaged as part of Breuer's design, was partially realized in the mid-1980s. The terminal underwent a more substantial refurbishment the following decade.

== See also ==
- History of Grand Central Terminal
- List of I. M. Pei projects
- List of Marcel Breuer works
