= Missoula station (Northern Pacific Railway) =

Missoula, MT
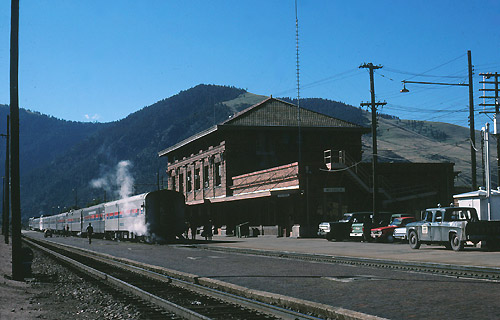
- Amtrak's North Coast Hiawatha at Missoula in July 1976

General information
- Location: Railroad and Higgins Avenue, Missoula, Montana; USA
- System: inter-city rail station
- Platforms: 1 side, 1 island platform (removed)
- Tracks: 2

History
- Opened: 1883
- Closed: 1979
- Rebuilt: 1901

Former services
Preceding station	Amtrak	Following station
Paradise toward Seattle	North Coast Hiawatha	Deer Lodge toward Chicago
Preceding station	Northern Pacific Railway	Following station
De Smet toward Seattle or Tacoma	Main Line	Bonner toward St. Paul
De Smet toward Wallace	Wallace – Missoula	Terminus
Post toward Darby	Bitter Root Branch	Terminus
- Northern Pacific Railroad Depot
- U.S. National Register of Historic Places
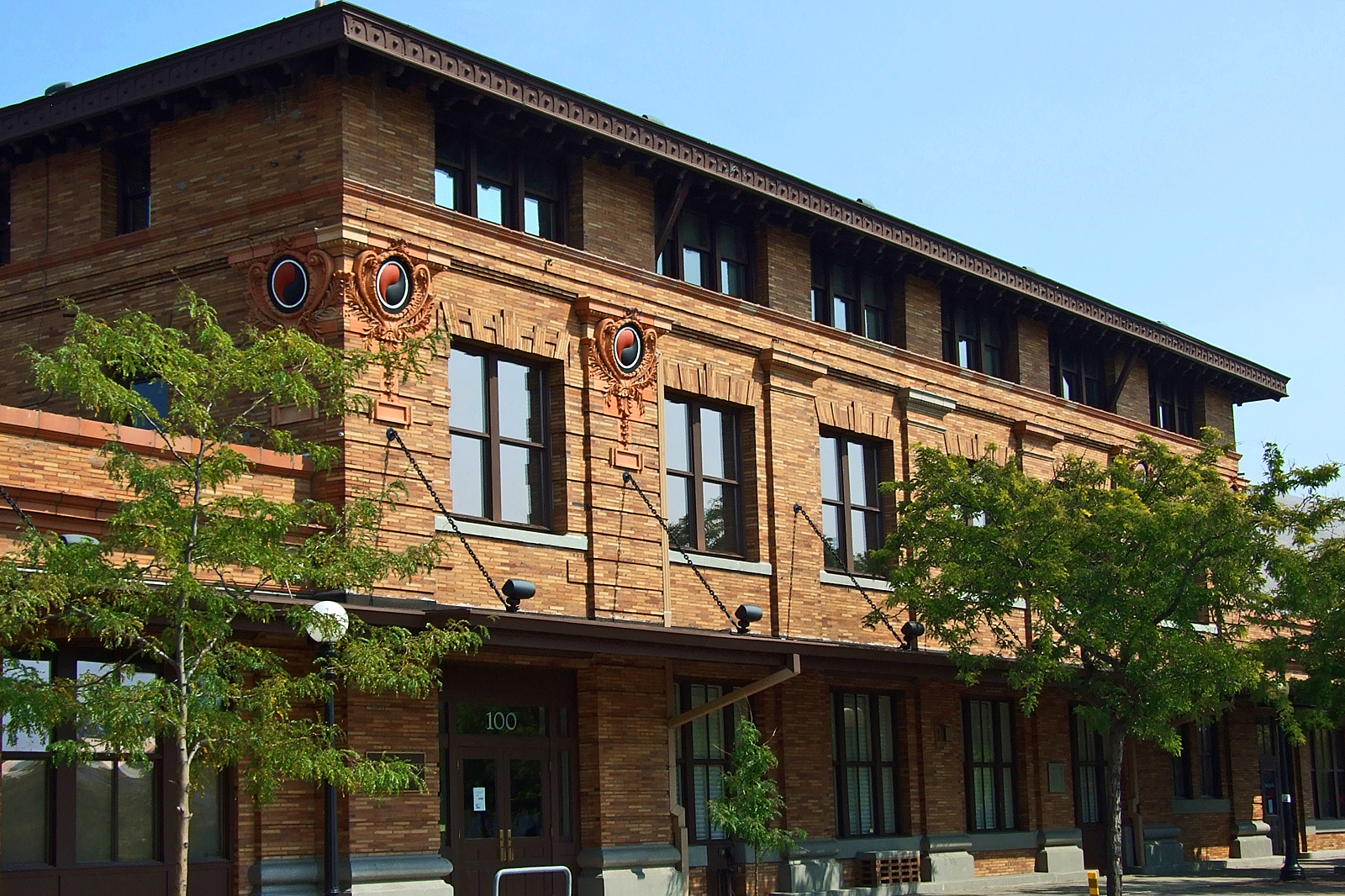
- The depot in 2012
- Location: Railroad and Higgins Avenue; Missoula, Montana
- Coordinates: 46°52′31″N 113°59′30″W
- Built: 1901
- Architect: Reed and Stem
- Architectural style: Simplified Renaissance Revival
- NRHP reference No.: 85000644
- Added to NRHP: March 28, 1985
Location

The Missoula station in Missoula, Montana, was built by the Northern Pacific Railway in 1901. The current structure is the third depot built in Missoula by the Northern Pacific, which reached Missoula in 1883. It was listed on the National Register of Historic Places in 1985, as the Northern Pacific Railroad Depot.

== History ==
The coming of the Northern Pacific Railway to Missoula ensured the town's economic prosperity as a major transportation hub in Western Montana. The first depot in Missoula was constructed in 1883 and was located approximately 800 feet (240 m) west of the current structure. This depot was planned to be replaced in 1896, but the replacement depot was destroyed by arson before it was completed. The current depot, which was completed in 1901, was designed by architects Reed and Stem of St. Paul, Minnesota, in a simplified Renaissance Revival style of architecture. Reed and Stem designed over 100 railroad depots, including the Grand Central Terminal in New York City.

The depot is constructed of beige Roman brick that had been salvaged by Northern Pacific from the railroad's abandoned Olympian Hotel project in Tacoma, Washington, that would later be rebuilt as Stadium High School. Bricks from that hotel would also be used to construct a depot at Wallace, Idaho the same year. The Missoula depot features a main three-story structure flanked by one story wings on each side. The main structure is divided by brick columns into six bays, with the outer four columns on each side sporting the Northern Pacific black and red yin-yang logo. The wings are likewise divided into four bays. The main structure has a hipped roof with terra cotta tiles, while the wings feature flat roofs.

Passenger trains of the Northern Pacific stopped at the depot through 1971, when passenger service in the United States was taken over by Amtrak. Amtrak continued to provide service to Missoula with the North Coast Hiawatha until 1979. The tracks are now used for freight only, and are owned by BNSF.

The depot was placed on the National Register of Historic Places on March 28, 1985, and is considered to be the most prominent structure symbolizing the importance of the railroad in developing and transforming Missoula's economy.

Near the depot is the preserved Northern Pacific #1356 4-6-0 steam locomotive.

== See also ==
- National Register of Historic Places listings in Missoula County, Montana
