= Bismarck station =

Bismarck, ND
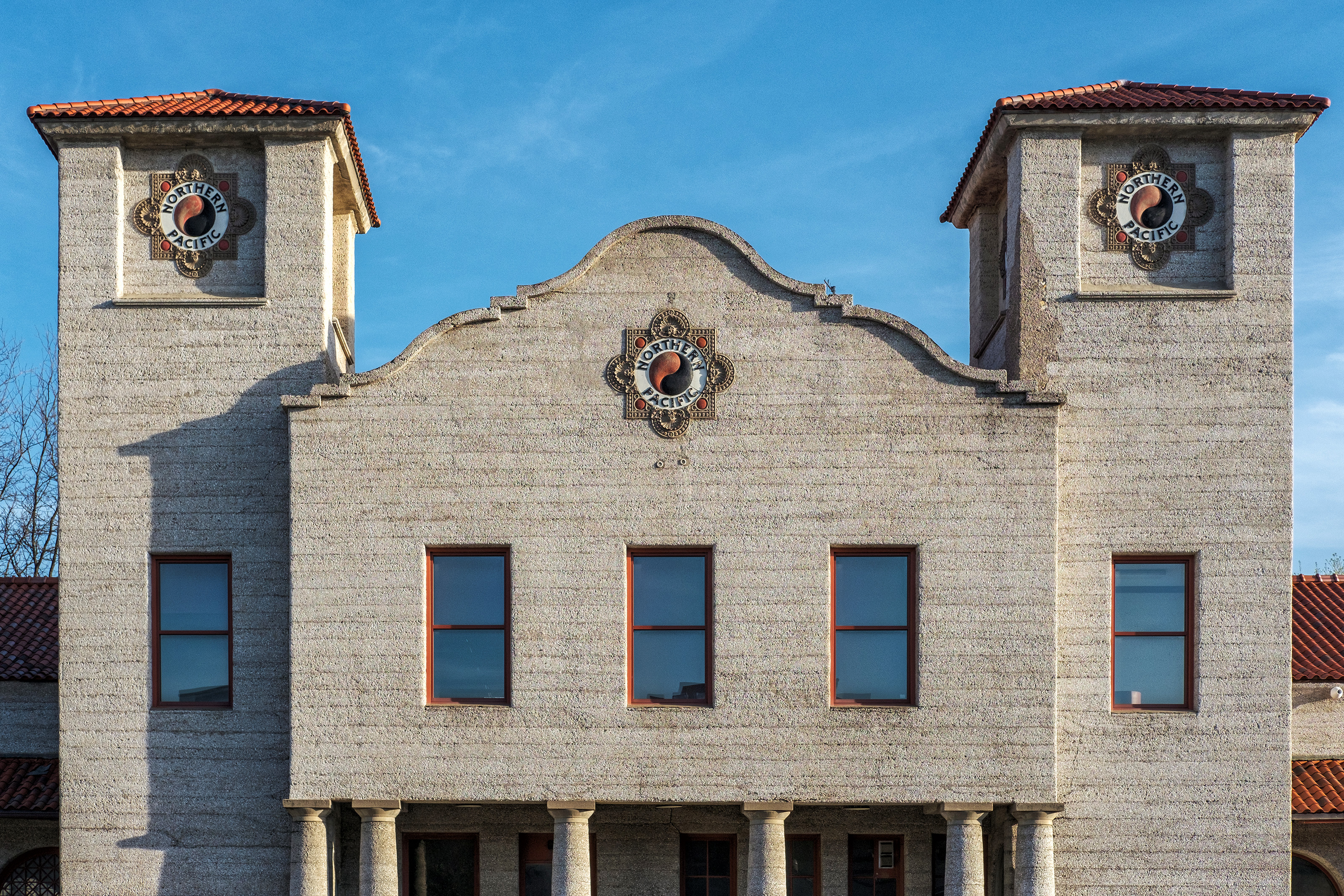
- The former Bismarck station in 2009.

General information
- Location: 410 East Main Avenue, Bismarck, North Dakota; USA
- System: inter-city rail station
- Platforms: 1 side platform (removed)
- Tracks: 4 (1 remains)

History
- Opened: June 5, 1873
- Closed: 1979
- Rebuilt: 1900

Former services
Preceding station	Amtrak	Following station
Mandan toward Seattle	North Coast Hiawatha	Jamestown toward Chicago
Preceding station	Northern Pacific Railway	Following station
Mandan toward Seattle or Tacoma	Main Line	Burleigh toward St. Paul
- Northern Pacific Railway Depot
- U.S. National Register of Historic Places
- Location: 410 E. Main Ave., Bismarck, North Dakota
- Coordinates: 46°48′18″N 100°47′7″W
- Area: 1 acre (0.40 ha)
- Built: 1900
- Architect: Reed & Stem
- Architectural style: Mission/Spanish Revival
- NRHP reference No.: 77001022
- Added to NRHP: September 19, 1977
Location

Bismarck station is a former railroad station in Bismarck, North Dakota, built in 1900.

== Architecture ==
The structure was built in the Mission/Spanish Revival style and designed by architects Reed & Stem of St. Paul, Minnesota, for the Northern Pacific Railway. It "is notable for its Spanish mission-style architecture, a familiar mode in the Southwest and California but uncommon in the northern plains."

The station's stucco-like exterior incorporated marble chips and the building was designed with red Ludowici tile. Cherry-trimmed railroad offices and waiting rooms were located in the building's central block, and floors featured elaborate mosaics.

== History ==
The station's location was originally the site of the Sheridan House, a prominent hotel. The hotel owner's eventually gave up their 99-year lease on the land and moved the hotel building across the street to allow for the construction of the Bismarck station in 1901.

After the Northern Pacific Railway and then Burlington Northern Railroad discontinued passenger service, Amtrak's North Coast Hiawatha used the station from 1971 until it was discontinued in 1979. The building was added to the National Register of Historic Places in 1977 as the Northern Pacific Railway Depot.

The station underwent a renovation that was completed in 2018, and a brewery was opened in the building. The brewery closed in 2020 with plans to renovate the building into restaurant, office, and event space.

== Bibliography ==
- Federal Writer's Project (1938). Bismarck North Dakota: A Short History of a Guide to Points of Interest In and About the City. Washington D.C.: Works Progress Administration.
