= Forest Lodge Library =

- Planter Road – Jackson Creek Bridge
- U.S. National Register of Historic Places
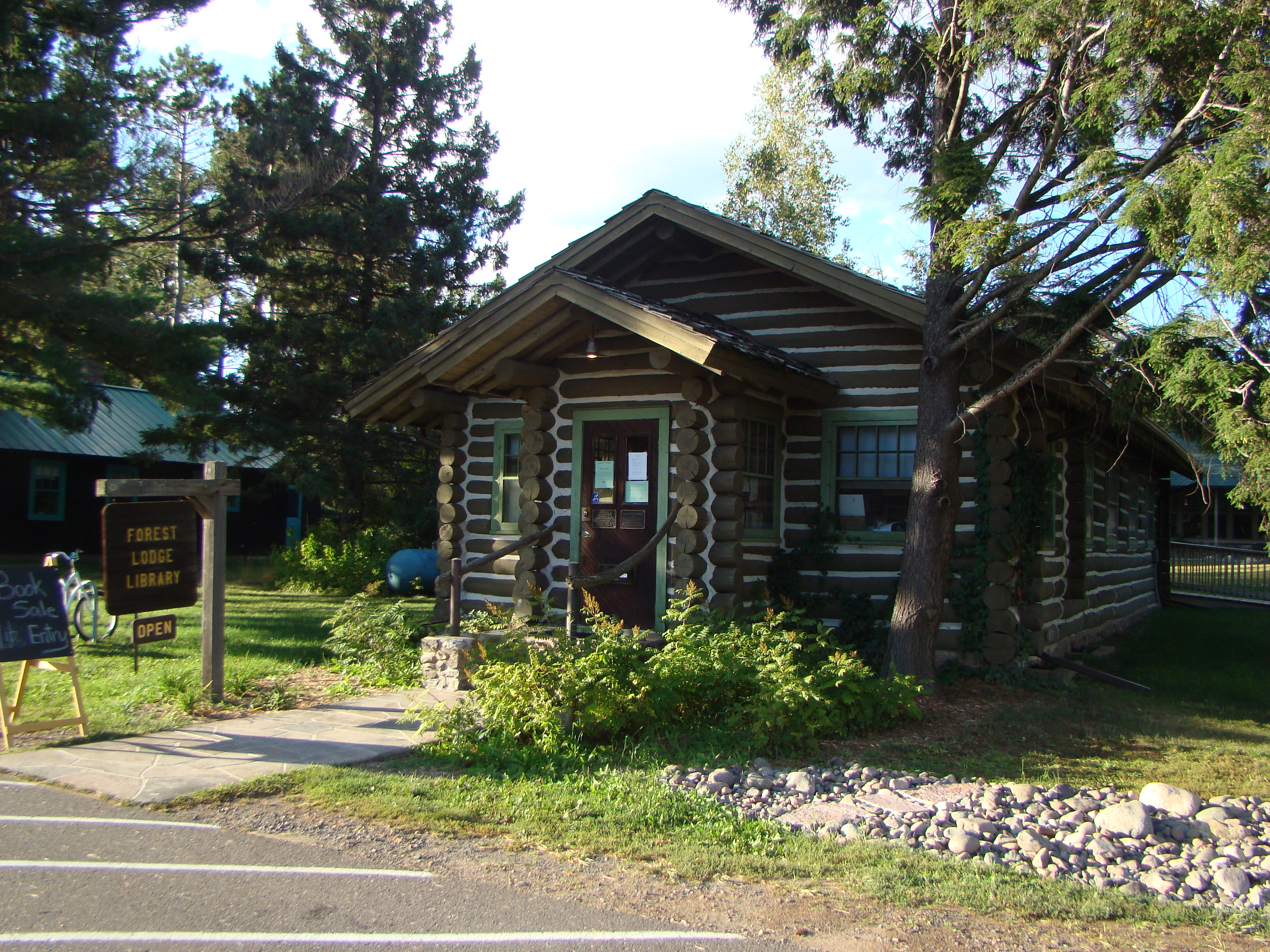

- Location within Wisconsin Location within the United States
- Location: Cable, Wisconsin
- Coordinates: 46.20784°N 91.29184°W
- Built: 1925
- NRHP reference No.: 01000735

The Forest Lodge Library is located in Cable, Wisconsin. It was added to the National Register of Historic Places in 2001. Additionally, it is on the registry of historic buildings for Wisconsin.

== History ==
The library was built in 1925. It was designed in part by Allen H. Stem of Reed and Stem. In addition to be a library, to building has also served as a meeting place for the local Lutheran church. It became a public library in 1969.
