= De Smet station =

Historic railroad depot in South Dakota, U.S.

De Smet
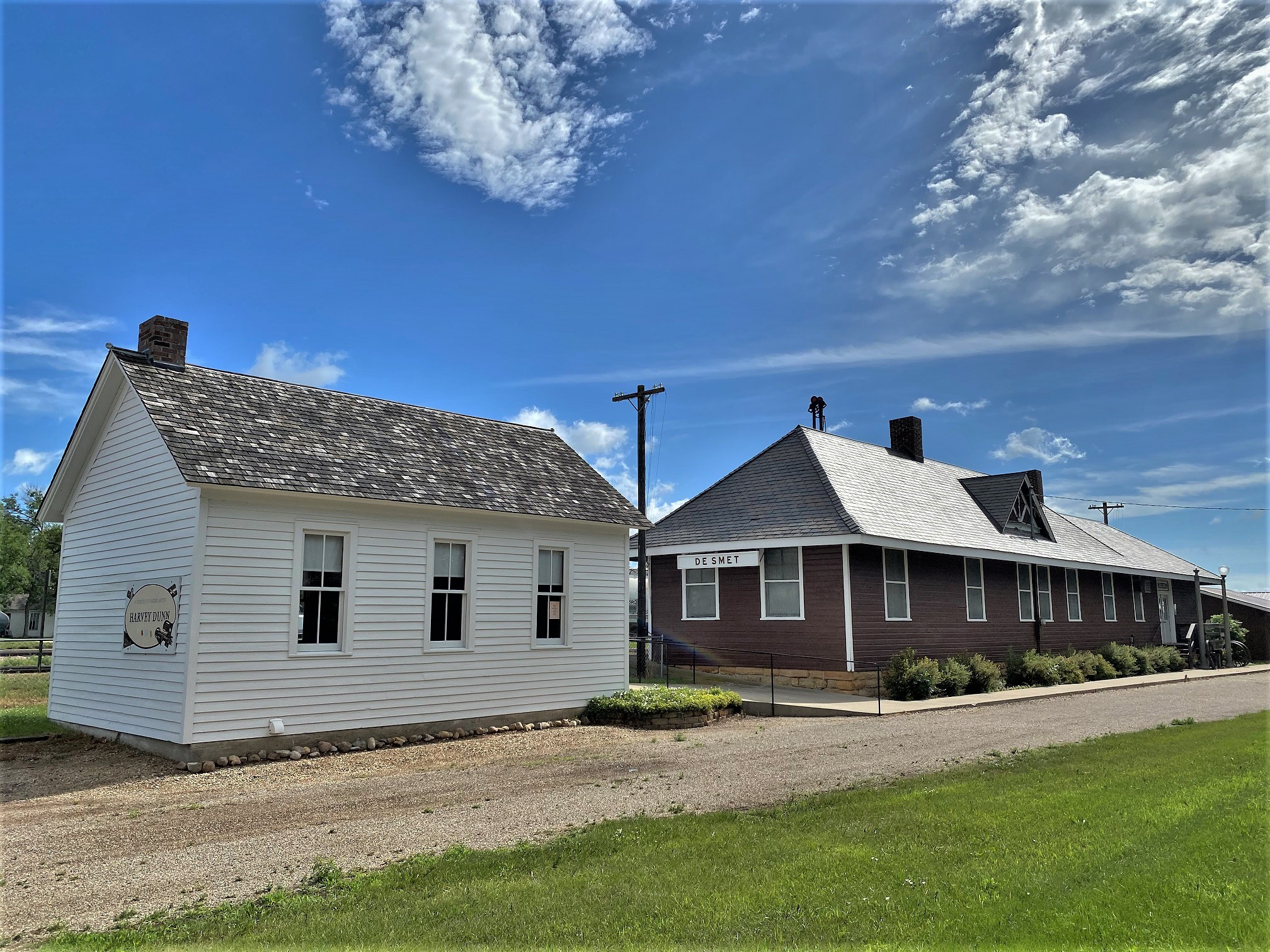
- De Smet depot (2020)

General information
- Location: 104 Calumet Ave NE, De Smet, South Dakota
- Coordinates: 44°23′09″N 97°32′50″W
- System: Former Chicago and North Western Railway passenger rail station

History
- Opened: 1906
- Closed: 1960

Former services
Preceding station	Chicago and North Western Railway	Following station
Manchester toward Lead	Elroy – Lead	Lake Preston toward Elroy
- Chicago Northwestern Depot
- U.S. National Register of Historic Places
- Location within South Dakota
- Location: Highway 25; De Smet, South Dakota
- Coordinates: 44°23′09″N 97°32′50″W
- Built: 1906
- Architect: C&NW Building and Bridge Department
- NRHP reference No.: 76001739
- Added to NRHP: December 12, 1976
Location

The Chicago Northwestern Depot in De Smet, South Dakota was built by the Chicago and North Western Railway (C&NW). It began construction in June 1905 and was finished in August 1906. The depot is consistent with other small depots built during the early 1900's with its hip roof, red horizontal wood siding, trackside bay window and floor plan. Limestone blocks from Lime Siding, Minnesota, serve as the building's foundation. The depot features two waiting rooms, one for the men and one for the women, separated by the agent's office as well as a freight portion on one end.

The depot was listed in the National Register of Historic Places because of its architecture and also because of its association with the development of De Smet. Passenger service ceased with the end of the Dakota 400 in 1960. Today, the former depot serves as a museum.
