= Alfred T. Fellheimer =

American architect (1875–1959)

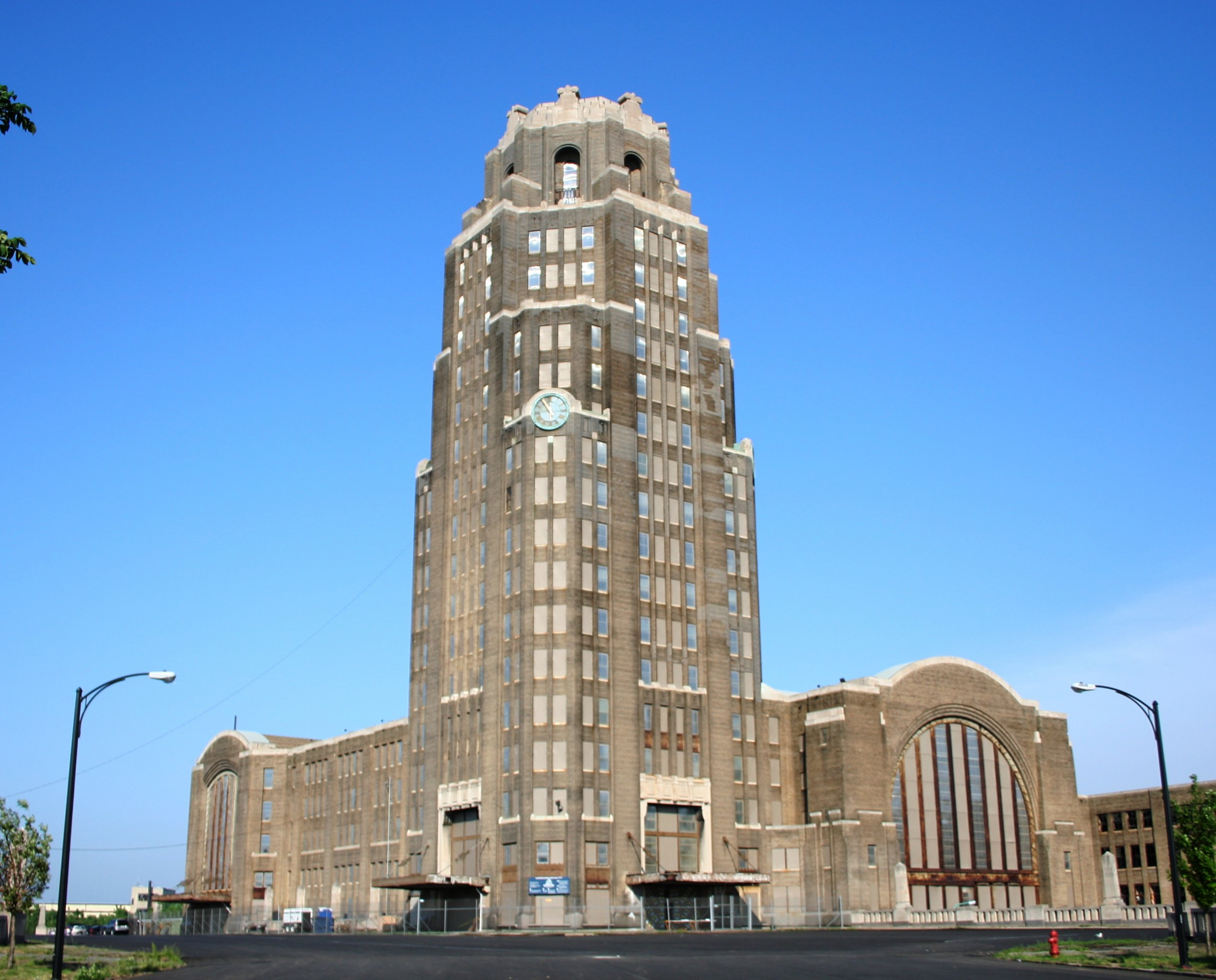
Buffalo Central Terminal

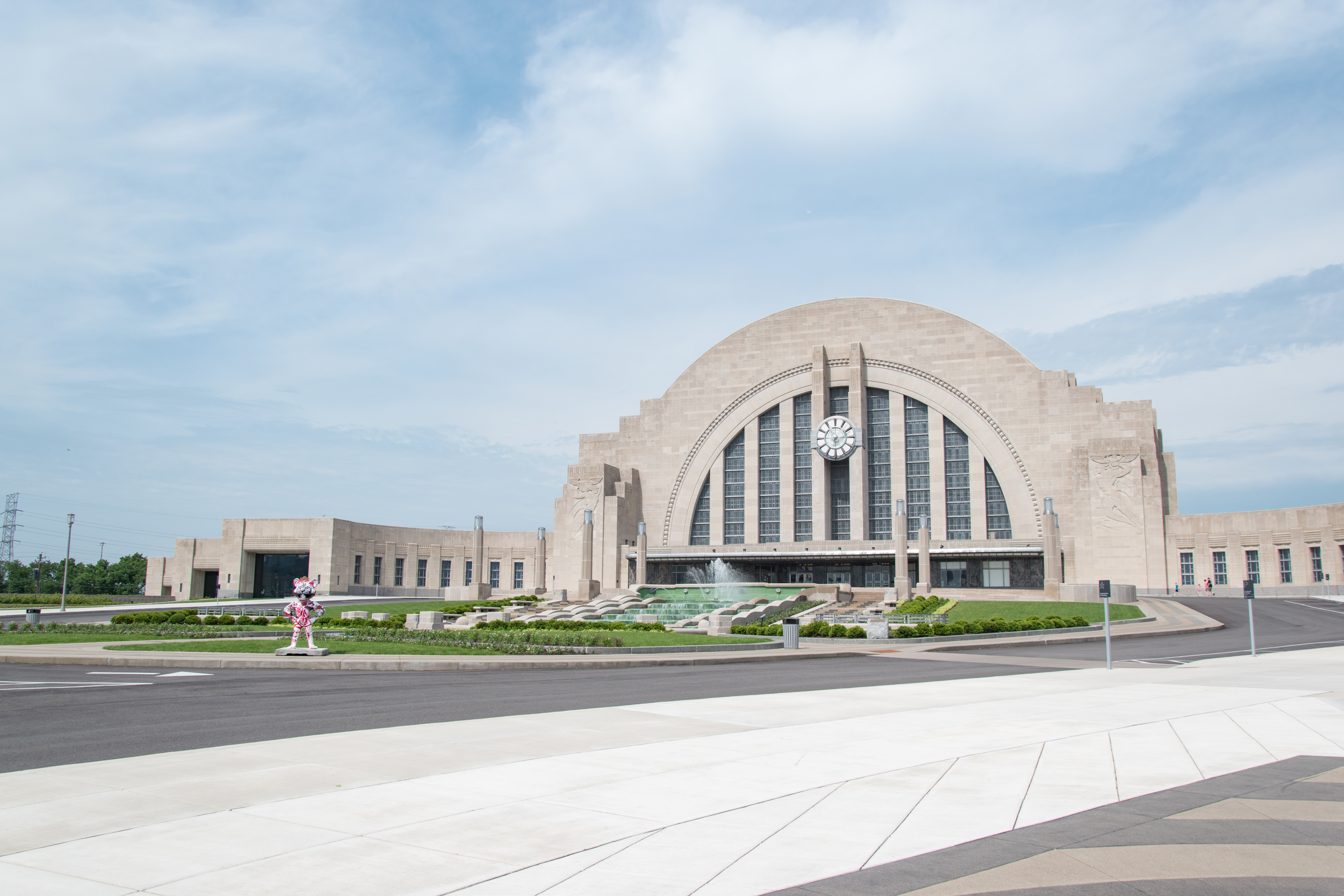
Cincinnati Union Terminal

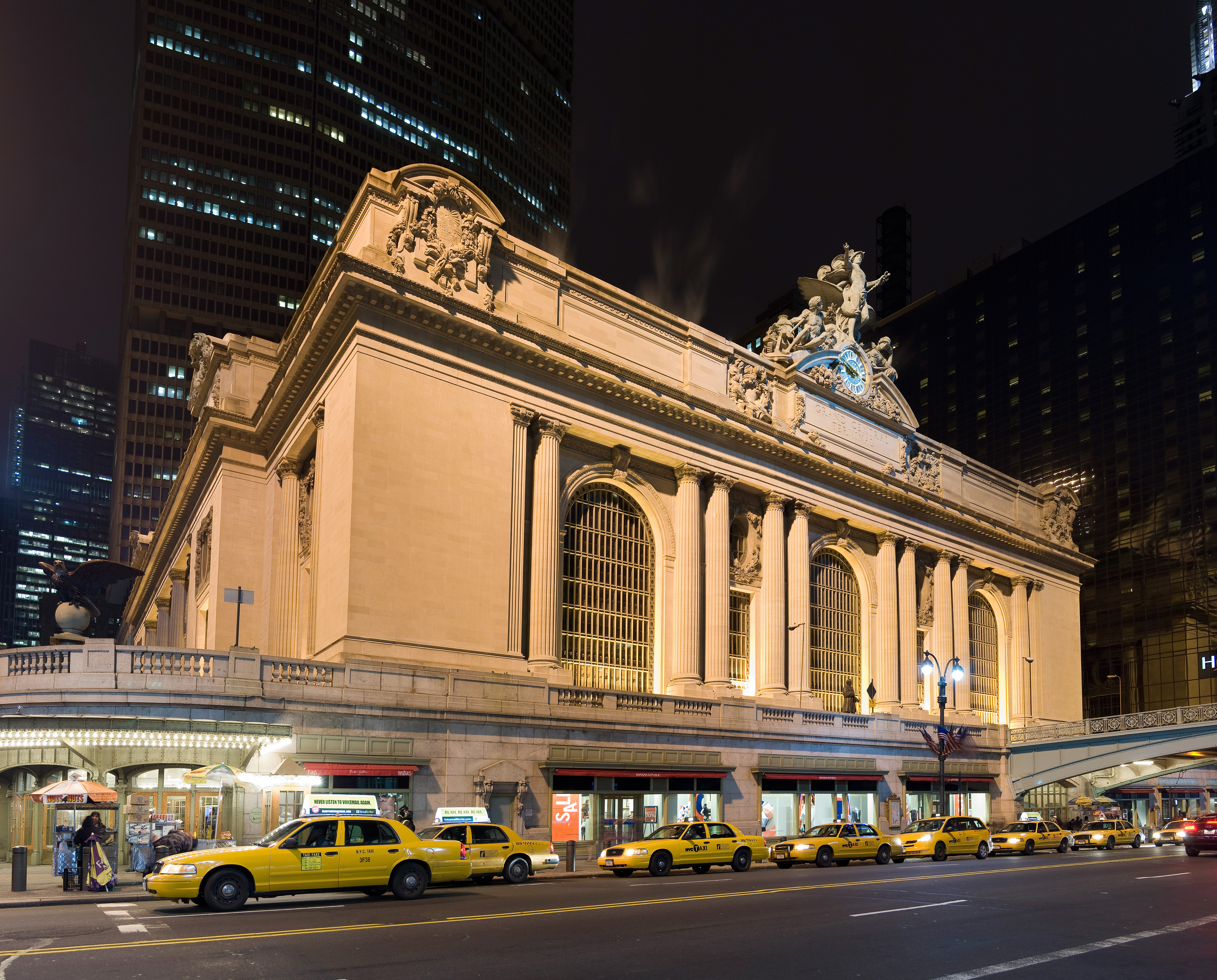
Grand Central Terminal

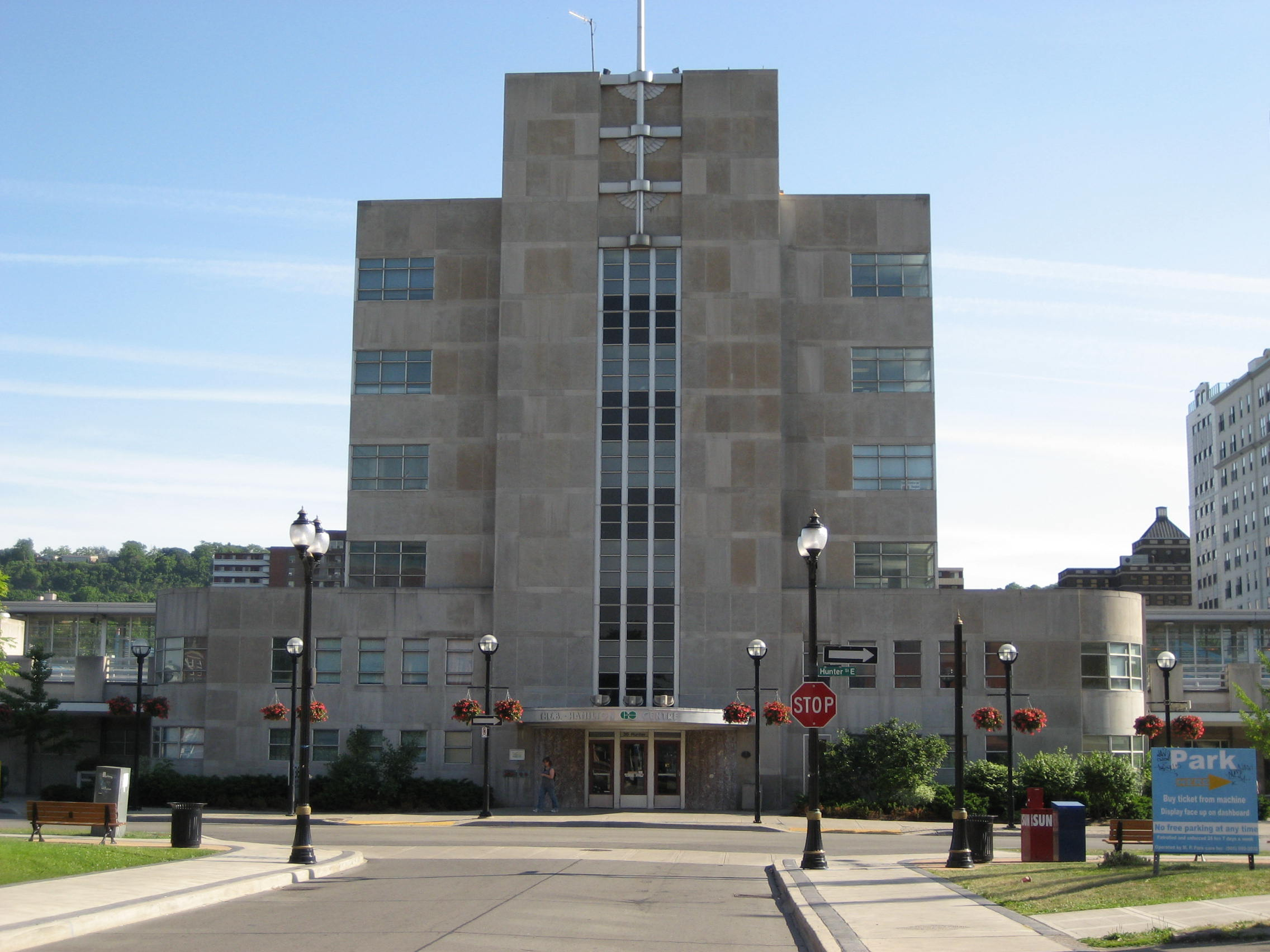
Hamilton GO station

Alfred T. Fellheimer (March 9, 1875 – 1959) was an American architect. He began his career with Reed & Stem, where he was lead architect for Grand Central Terminal. Beginning in 1928, his firm Fellheimer & Wagner designed Cincinnati Union Terminal.

== Biography ==
Fellheimer was born in Chicago. He graduated in 1895 from the University of Illinois School of Architecture where he had studied with Nathan Clifford Ricker.

In 1898, he joined the firm of Frost & Granger. In 1903 he joined Reed and Stem. As a junior partner he was lead architect in Reed & Stem's partnership with Warren and Wetmore to design Grand Central Terminal during its construction, starting in 1903. Following the death of Charles Reed in 1911 he became a named partner of Stem & Fellheimer which designed Union Station (Utica, New York) in 1913. The firm became Fellheimer & Long with Allen H. Stem Associated Architects in 1914 and designed the Morris Park station in the Bronx.

In 1923 he and an associate, Steward Wagner, from the earlier firm formed Fellheimer & Wagner and designed the Union Station in Erie, Pennsylvania. The firm completed the Cincinnati station in 1933. In 1939 the firm had a commission to do a complete overhaul of the CBS Studio Building.

The firm became Fellheimer, Wagner & Vollmer which designed the Farragut Houses project in Brooklyn starting in 1942. and the Albany Houses complex in Brooklyn starting in 1950 for the New York City Housing Authority.

In 1951, the firm designed a new Montclair, New Jersey branch store with Roland Wank for Newark-based Hahne & Company. In 1952, Fellheimer & Wagner designed the Beekman Theatre in New York City.

The architectural drawings of Fellheimer & Wagner are held by the Department of Drawings & Archives at the Avery Architectural and Fine Arts Library, Columbia University.

== Projects ==
- Grand Central Terminal, Manhattan, New York, 1913
- Quaker Ridge (NYW&B station), New Rochelle, New York, 1912
- Union Station, Utica, New York, 1913
- Morris Park (NYW&B station), Bronx, New York 1914
- Terminal Station (Macon, Georgia), 1916
- Union Station (Burlington, Vermont), 1916
- Union Station, Erie Pennsylvania, 1927
- Greensboro (Amtrak station), Greensboro, North Carolina, 1927
- Buffalo Central Terminal, Buffalo, New York, 1929
- Union Station (South Bend, Indiana), 1929
- Hamilton GO Centre (TH&B Head Office and Hamilton Station), Hamilton, Ontario (1931-1933)
- Cincinnati Union Terminal, Cincinnati, Ohio, 1933
- CBS Studio Building, Manhattan, New York, 1939 (remodel)
- Farragut Houses, Brooklyn, New York, 1942
- Albany Houses, Brooklyn, New York, 1950
- Hahne & Company department store, Montclair, New Jersey, 1951
- Beekman Theatre, Manhattan, 1952

== See also ==
- Avery Architectural and Fine Arts Library

== Gallery ==
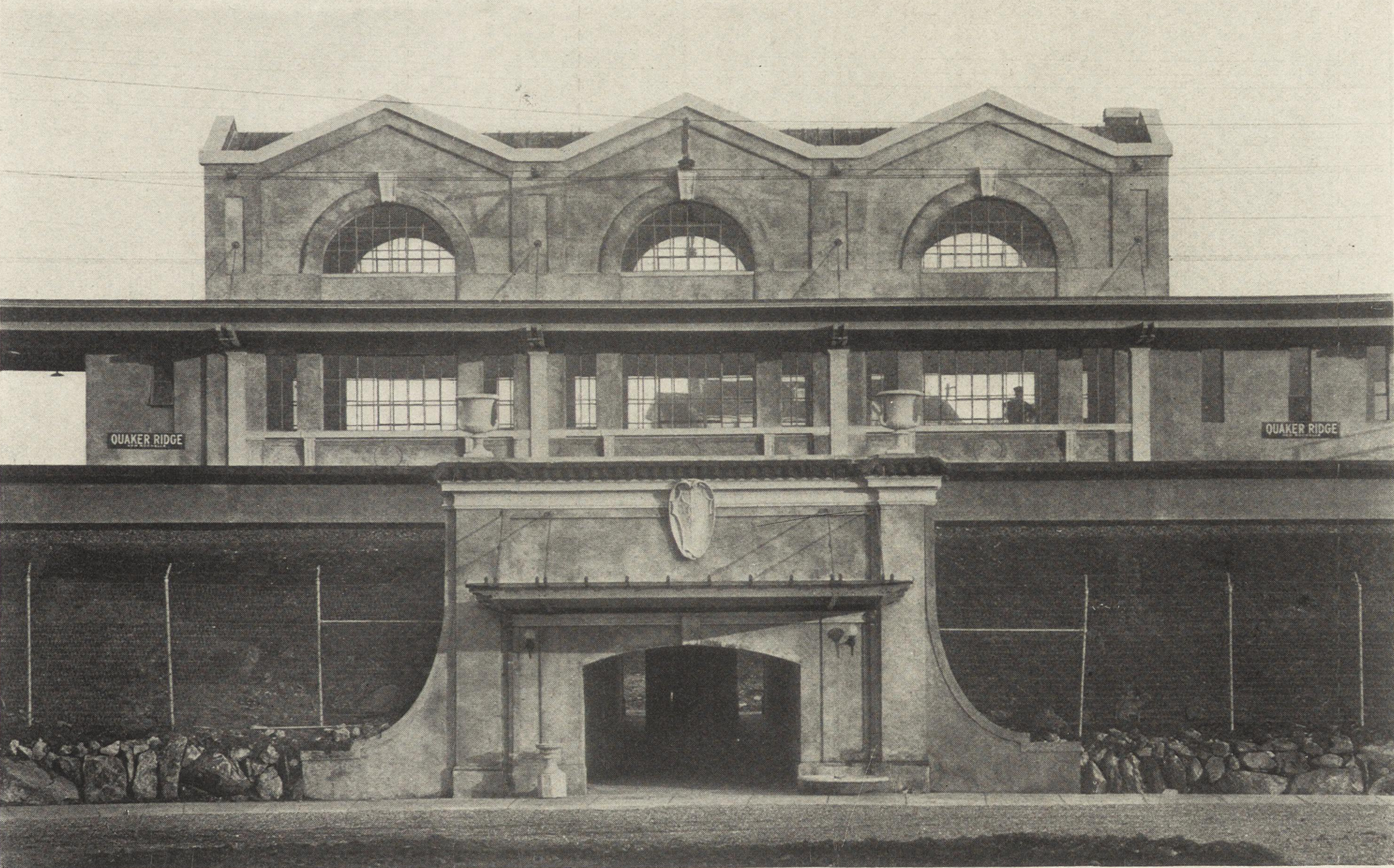
Quaker Ridge Station of New York, Westchester and Boston Railway, New Rochelle, New York

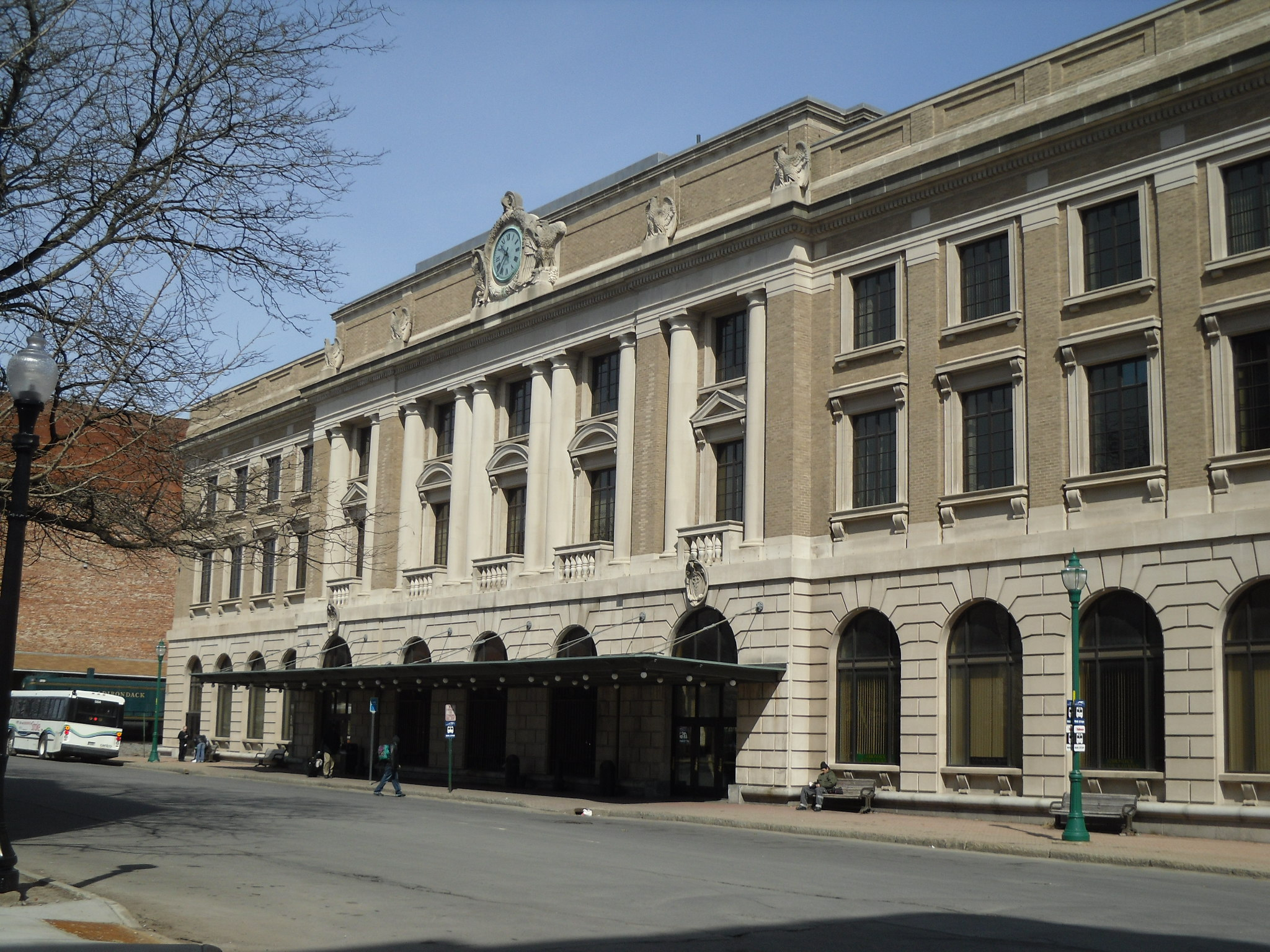
Union Station, Utica, New York

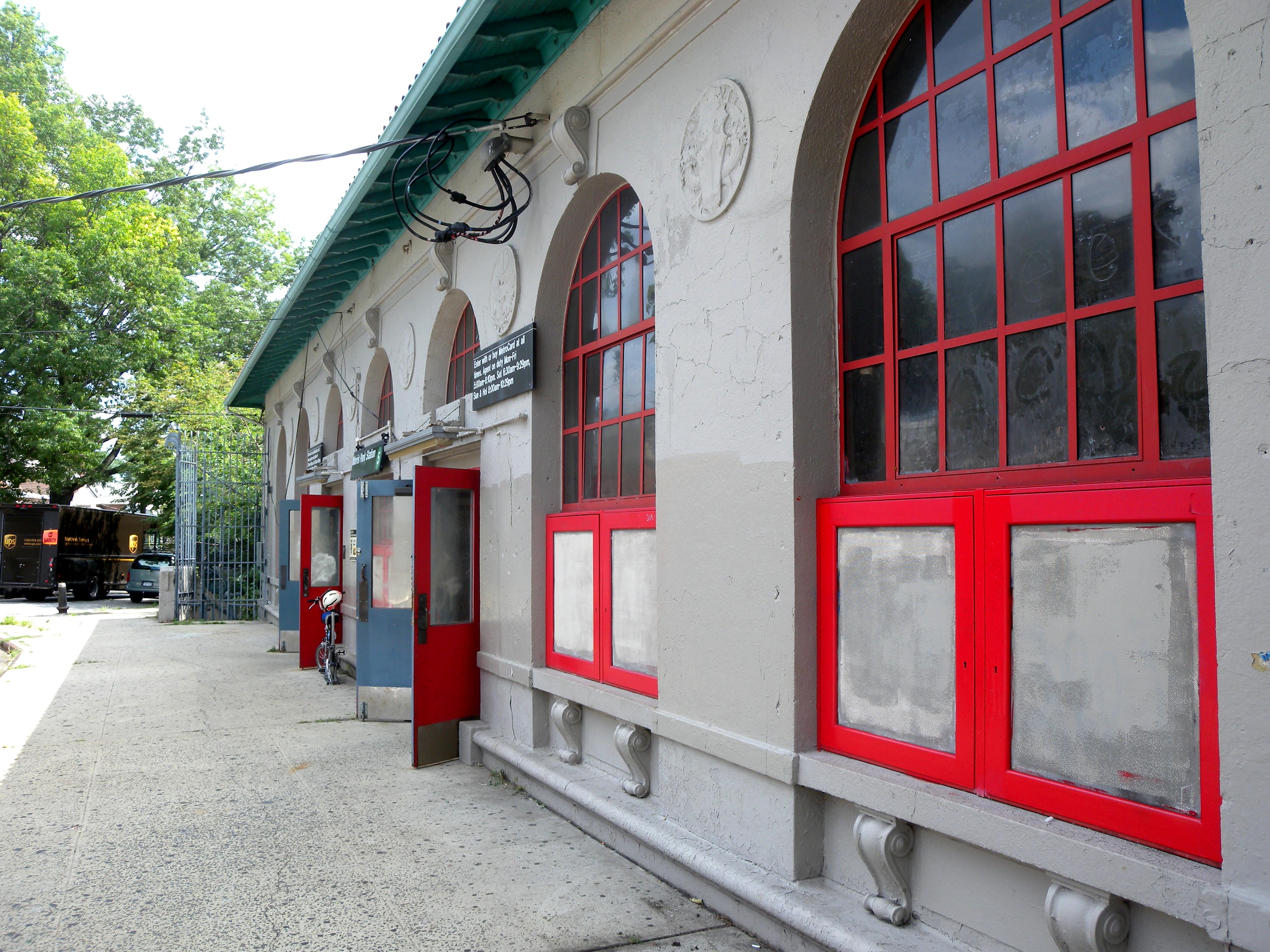
Morris Park Station facade, New York, Westchester and Boston Railroad, Bronx, New York

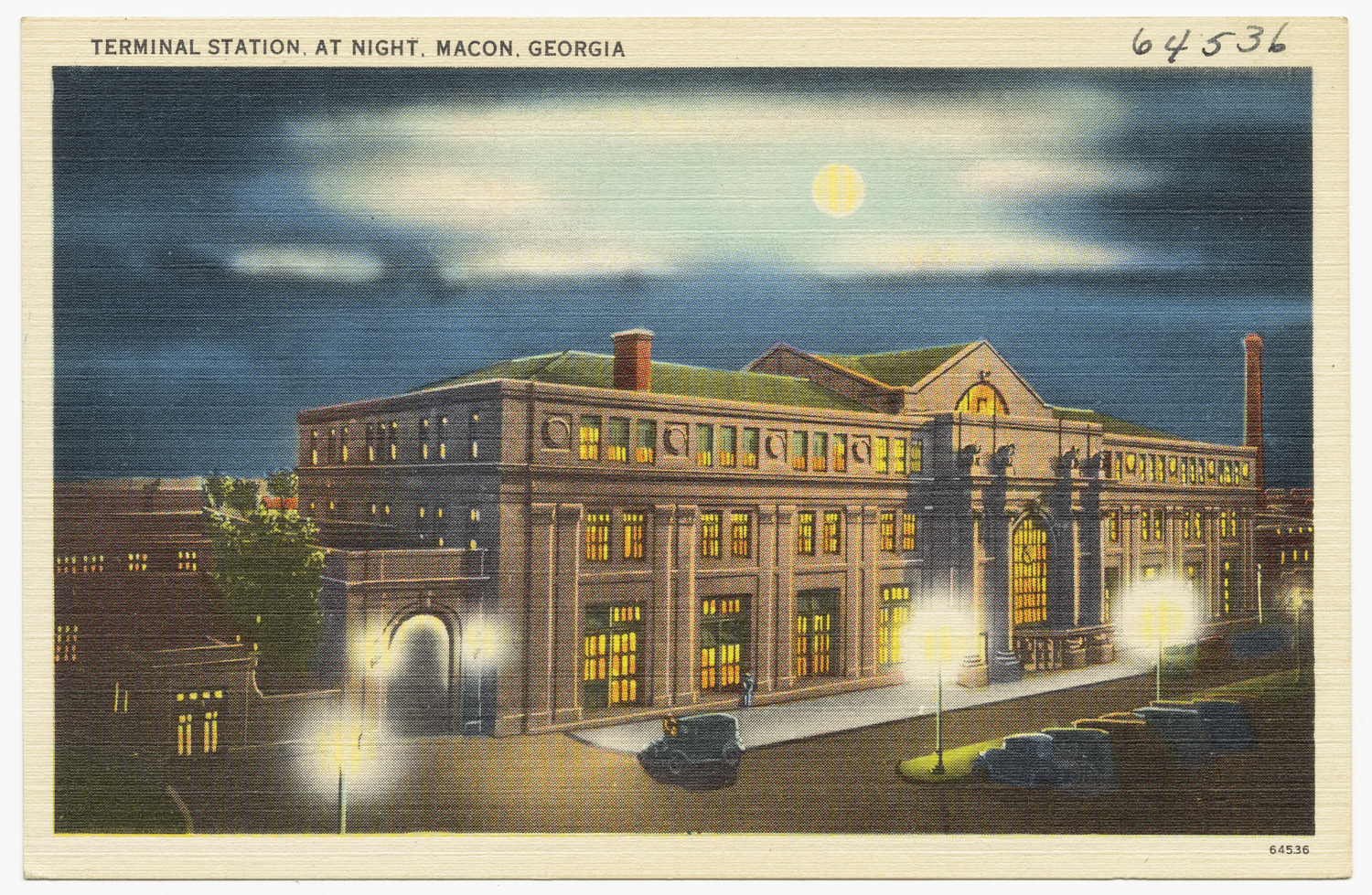
Terminal Station, Macon, Georgia

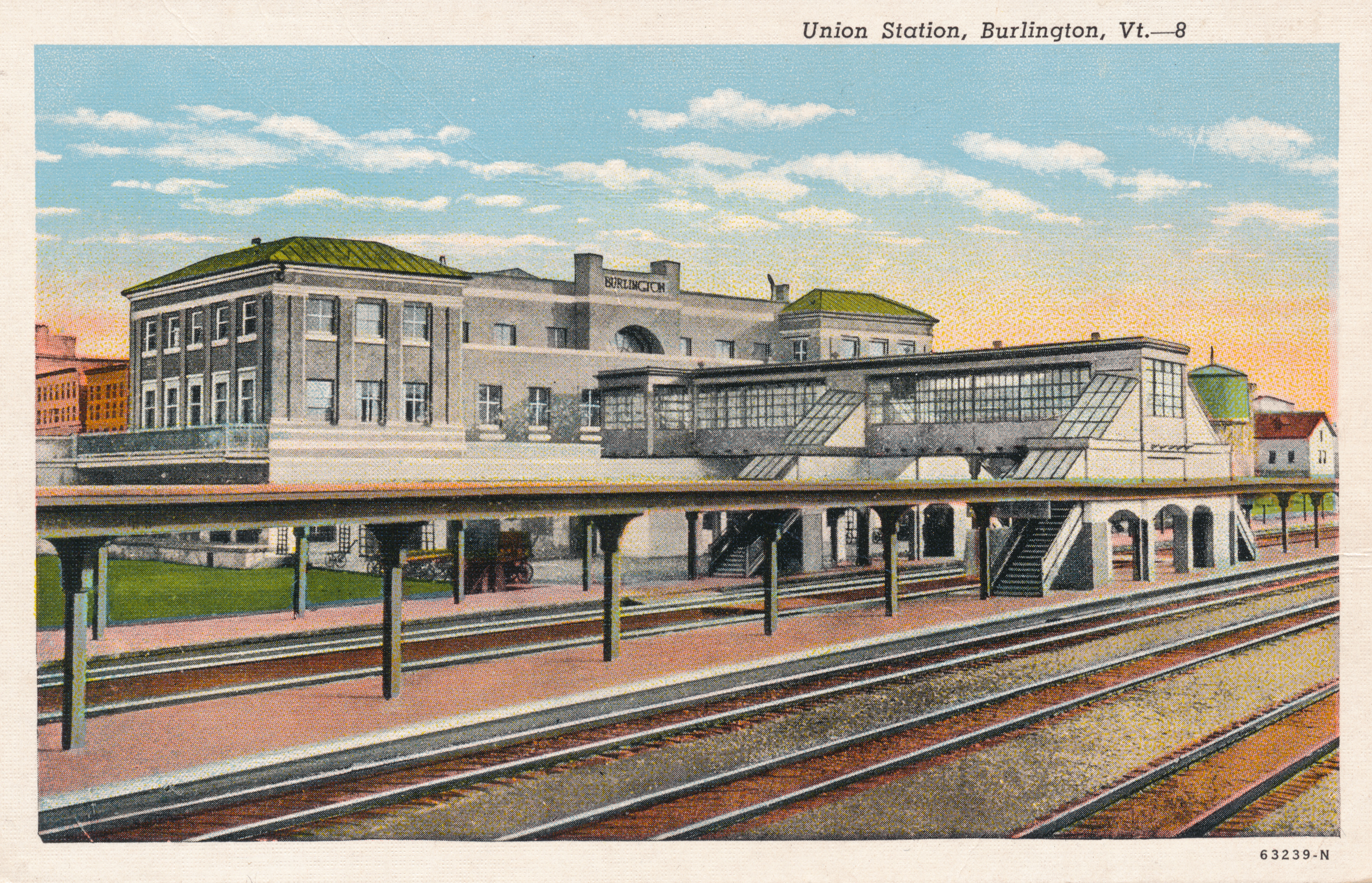
Union Station, Burlington, Vermont

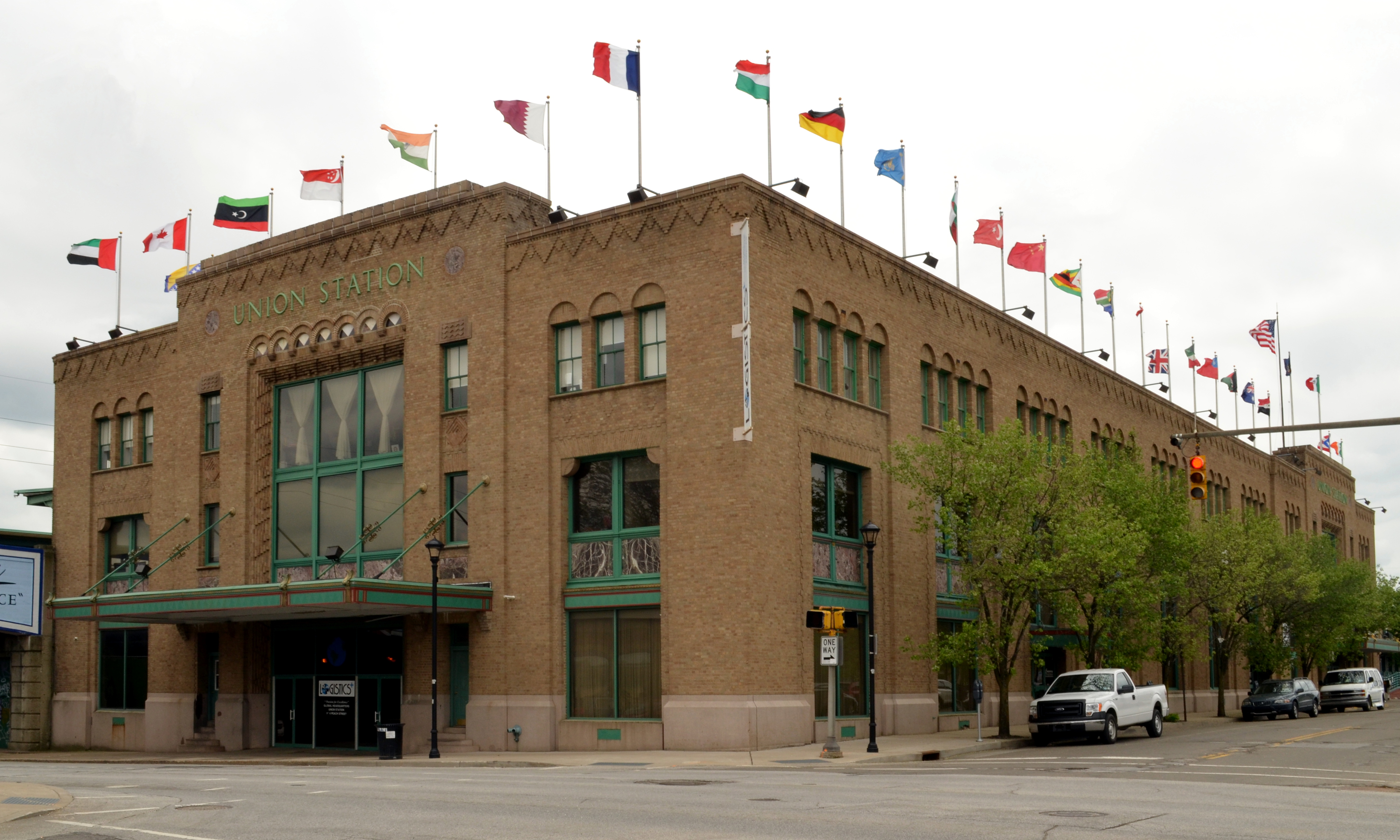
Union Station, Erie, Pennsylvania

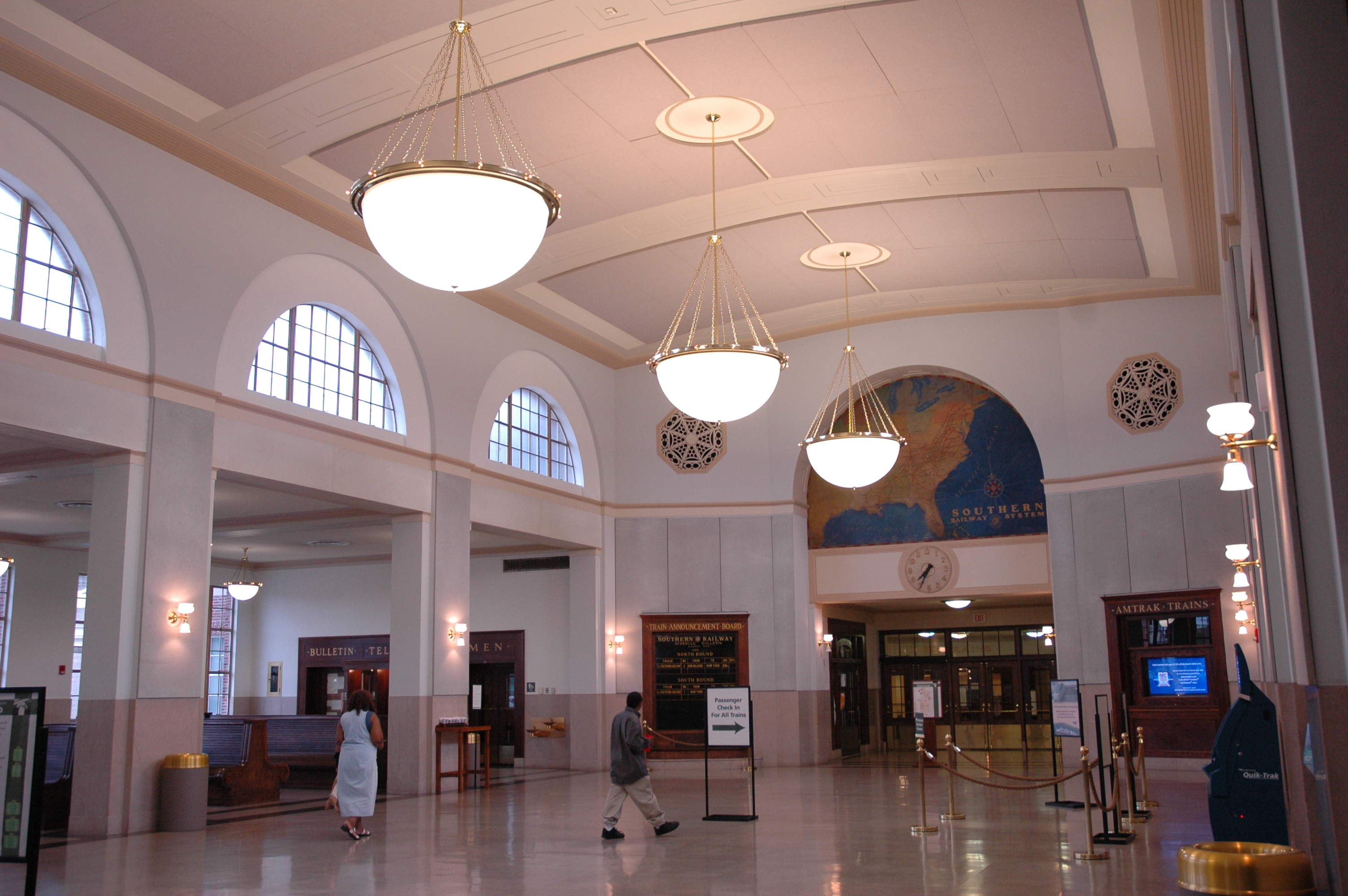
Southern Railway (Amtrak) Depot interior, Greensboro, North Carolina

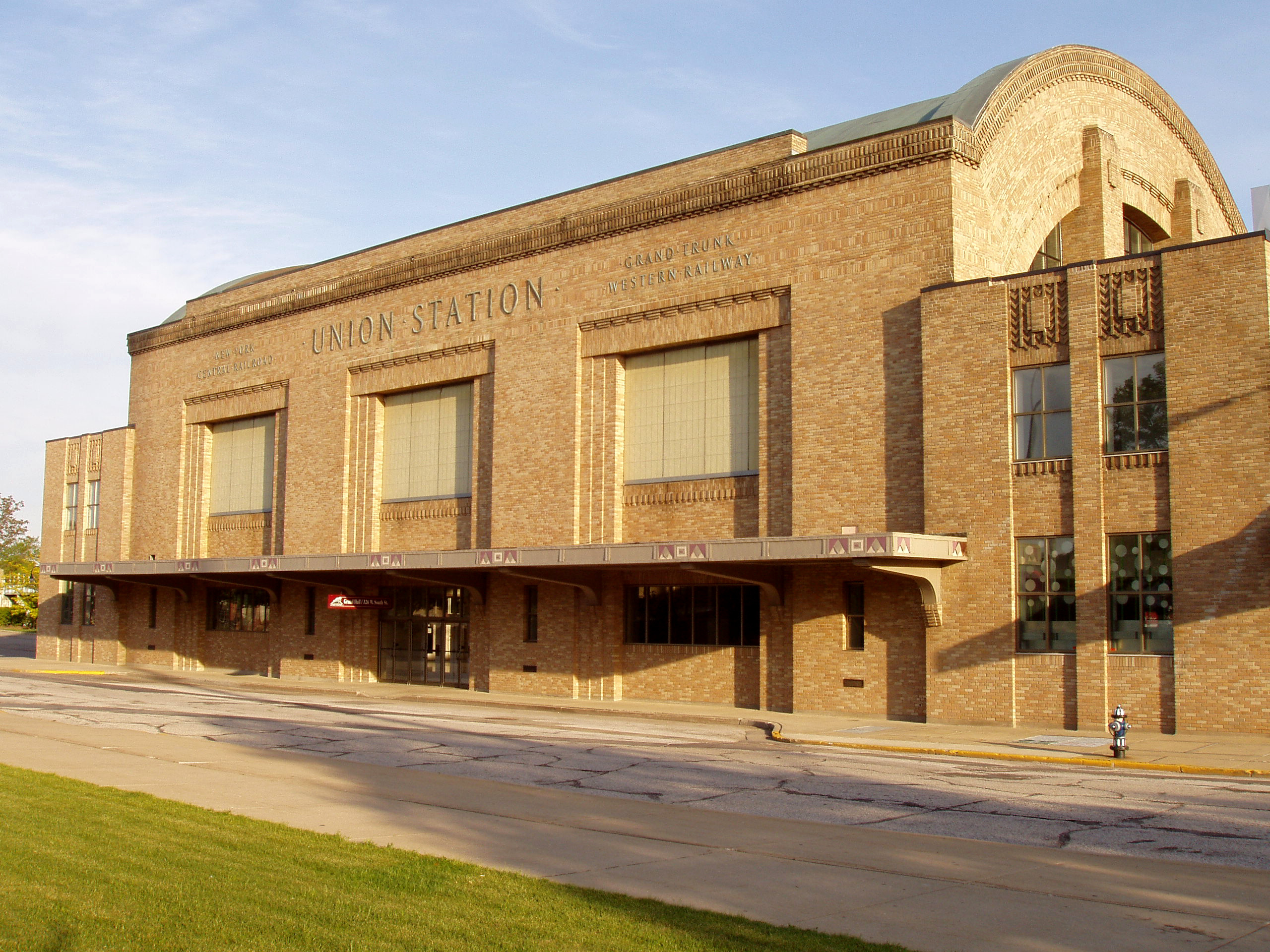
Union Station, South Bend, Indiana

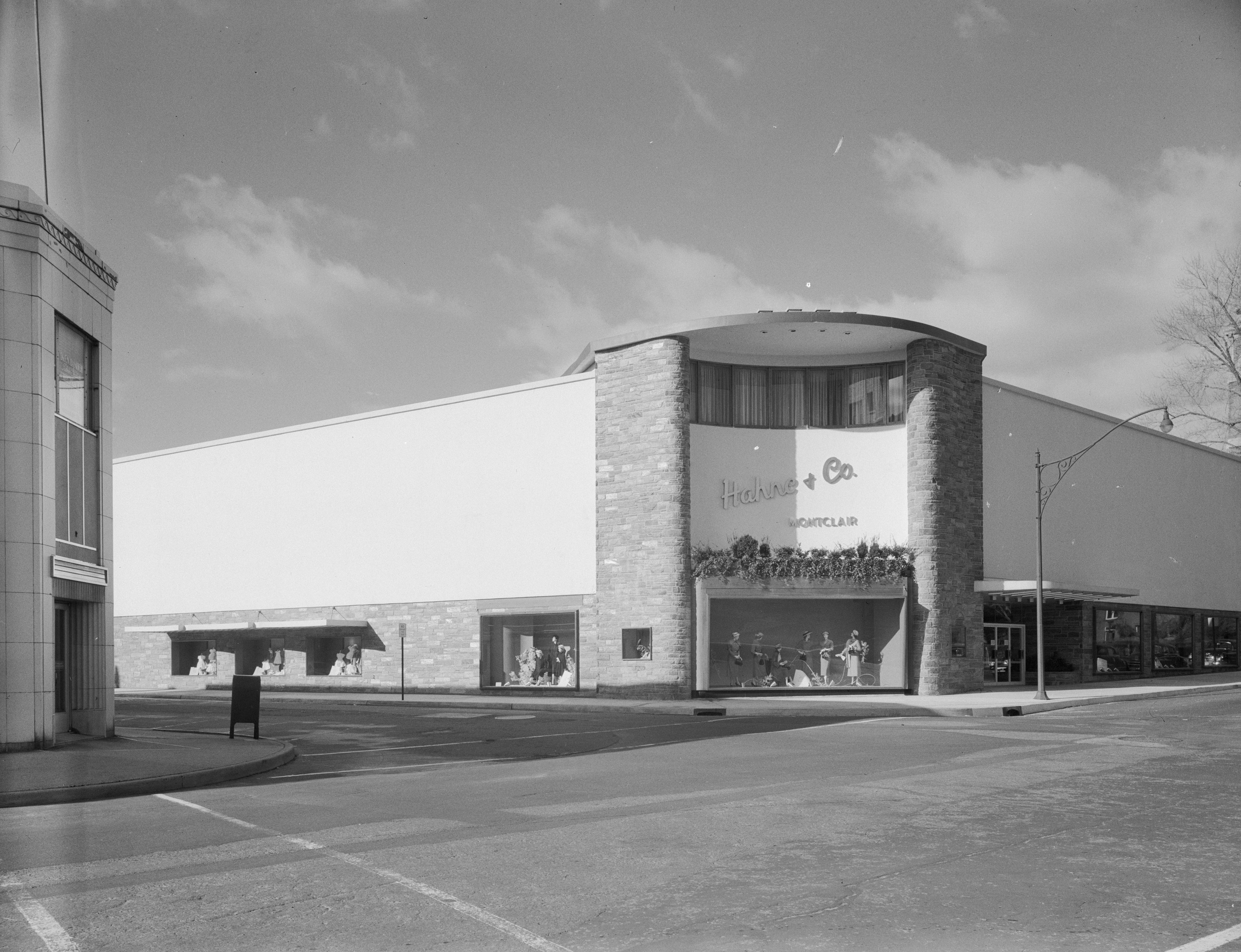
Hahne & Company department store, Montclair, New Jersey
