= Reed and Stem =

American architectural and engineering firm

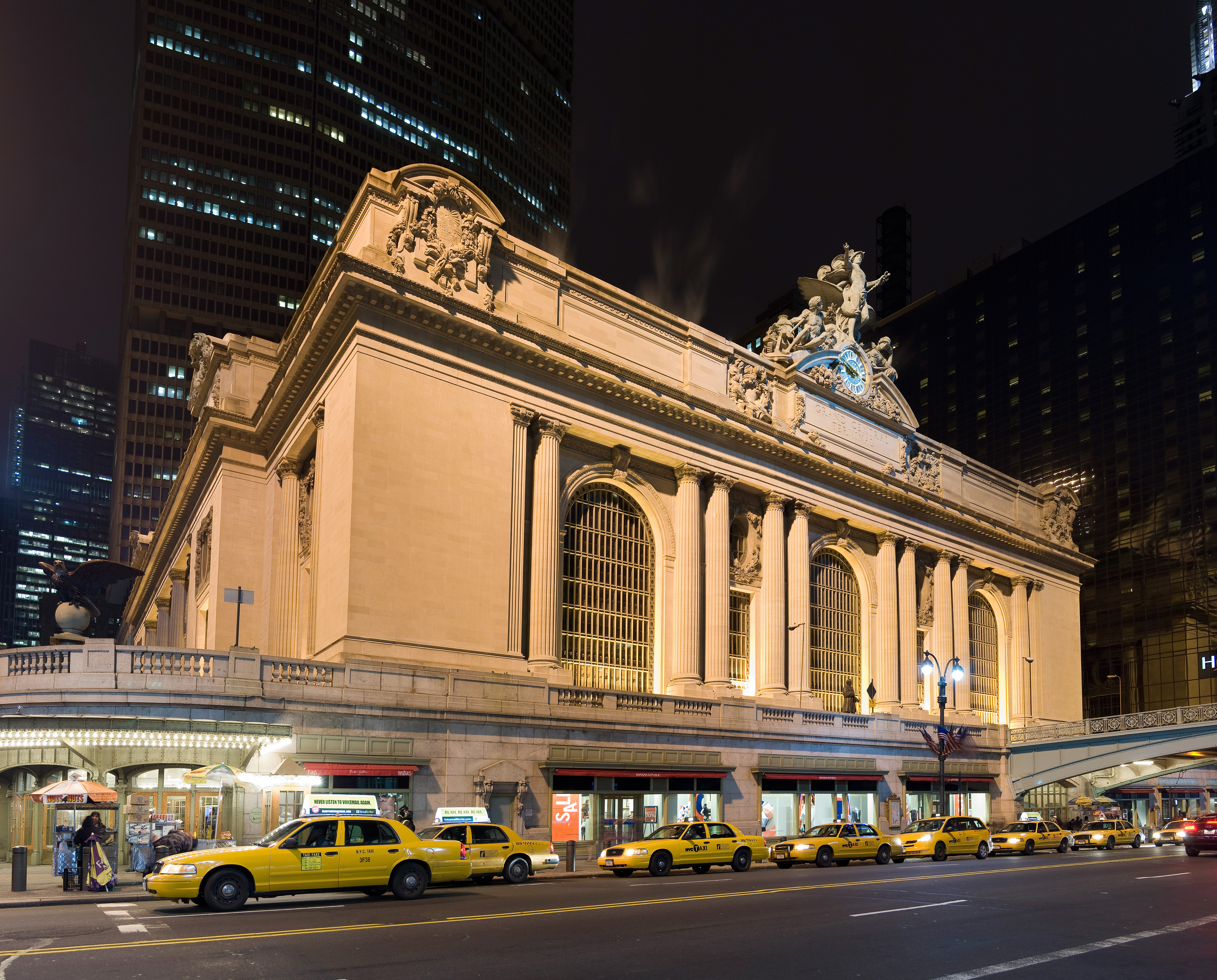
Grand Central Terminal (1913), New York City, designed with Beaux-Arts architecture

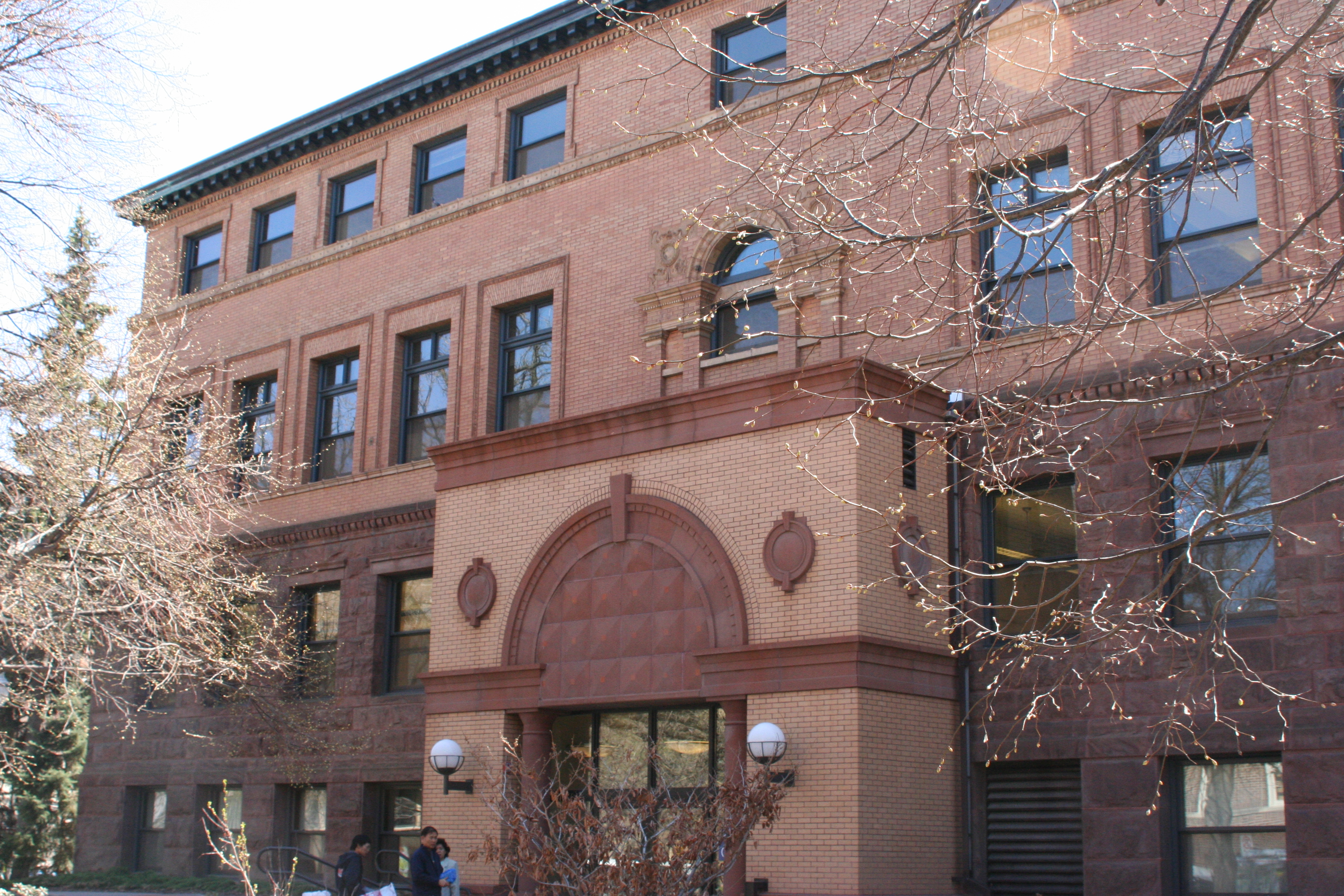
Wulling Hall (Medical Hall), Minneapolis, Minnesota

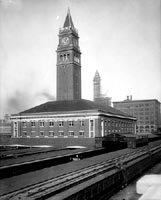
King Street Station, Seattle, Washington

Reed and Stem (present-day WASA Studio) is an American architectural and engineering firm. The firm was founded in St. Paul, Minnesota in 1891 as a partnership between Charles A. Reed (1858–1911) and Allen H. Stem (1856–1931), the successful partnership captured a wide range of commissions. The firm was reformed as Wank Adams Slavin Associates in 1961, and adopted the name WASA Studio in 2004.

== History ==
One early work was Medical Hall on the campus of the University of Minnesota. They were, however, most widely known for their work on railway stations over the course of two decades. Through Reed's relationship, by marriage, to the president of the New York Central Railroad, they gained a high-profile commission for the construction of New York's Grand Central Terminal with the architecture firm of Warren and Wetmore, and the newly hired Alfred T. Fellheimer as lead architect. In addition, Reed and Stem undertook many significant projects for the Great Northern Railway and the Northern Pacific Railway. After Reed's death, Stem continued to practice with Fellheimer until his retirement in 1920.

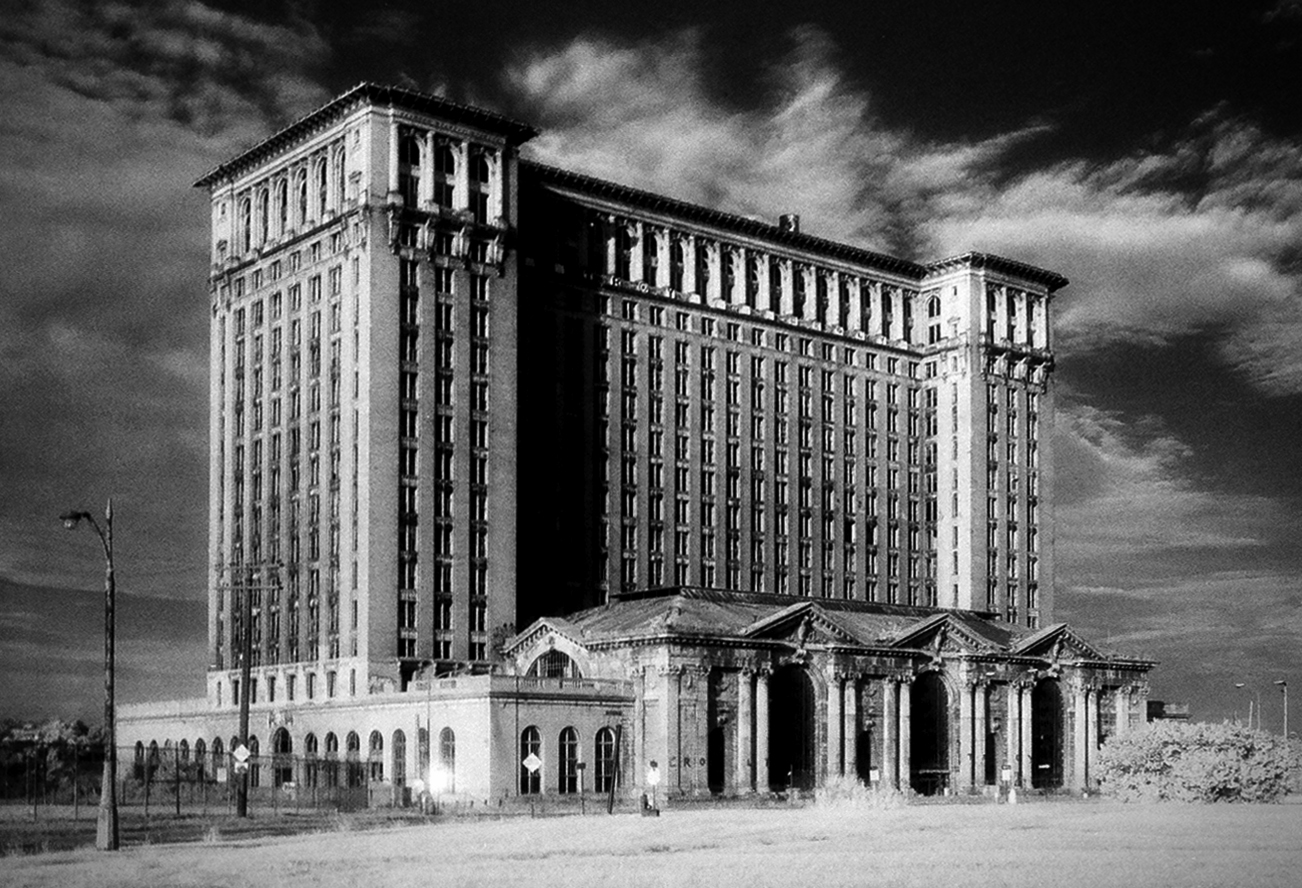
Michigan Central Station, Detroit, Michigan

The firm moved from Minnesota to New York after being selected to design Grand Central Terminal.

The Reed and Stem papers held by the Northwest Architectural Archives, in the Elmer L. Andersen Library, at the University of Minnesota constitute only a small portion of their output. Eight unique commissions are listed, and represent a sample of the firm's experience in non-railroad related commission work, namely residences and commercial buildings.

The firm was reformed as Wank Adams Slavin Associates in 1961, and adopted the name WASA Studio in 2004. The firm's office is located on Broadway. In 2015, the firm—which had millions of dollars in debt and was facing several lawsuits from previous former clients—filed for bankruptcy and was granted chapter 11 protection from creditors.

== Major commissions ==
The firm "has worked on more than 100 train stations ... along with college campus buildings and corporate parks."

- Grand Central Terminal, New York, New York, 1913, NRHP-listed
- King Street Station, Seattle, Washington, 1906
- Livingston Depot, Livingston, Montana, 1902
- Crane Ordway Building, St. Paul, Minnesota, 1904
- The Saint Paul Hotel, St. Paul, Minnesota, 1910
- Michigan Central Station, Detroit, Michigan, 1913
- Tacoma Union Station, Tacoma, Washington, 1911
- Wulling Hall (Medical Hall), University of Minnesota, Minneapolis, Minnesota, 1892
- Northern Pacific Depot, Ellensburg, Washington, 1910
- Grand Central Palace, New York City, 1913 with Warren and Wetmore, demolished 1964
- Saint Paul Athletic Club, St. Paul
- Cincinnati Union Terminal
- Jerome Robbins Theater

== Work with the Northern Pacific Railway ==
During the tenure of President Howard Elliott (1903–1912), the Northern Pacific Railway Company engaged in the upgrading of numerous depots across its system, from Minnesota to Washington. Many of these depots bear common architectural stamps, and are likely to be Reed and Stem designs. There is also the possibility the designs for smaller stations were drawn up by the Northern Pacific's Engineering Department, based on the design elements of Reed and Stem. In addition to the major works, such as the Tacoma Union Station and the former Montana Division Headquarters at Livingston, Montana, these lesser structures like Ellensburg, Washington, probably include:

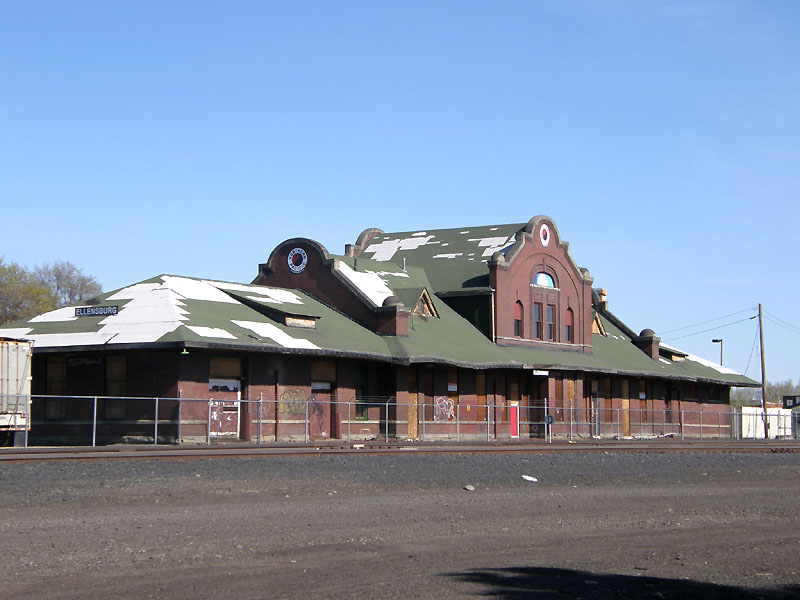
Northern Pacific Railway depot overview, Ellensburg, Washington

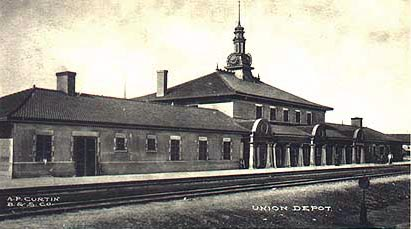
Northern Pacific Railway depot overview, Helena, Montana, circa 1904

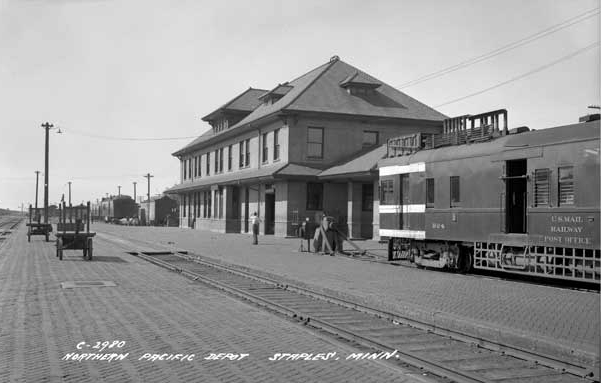
Northern Pacific Railway depot, Staples, Minnesota

- Aitkin, Minnesota, 1916
- Beach, North Dakota
- Belgrade, Montana
- Billings, Montana, 1909
- Butte, Montana, 1906
- Centralia, Washington, 1912
- Chehalis, Washington, 1912
- Detroit Lakes, Minnesota, 1908
- Fergus Falls, Minnesota
- Garrison, Montana, demolished 2000
- Helena, Montana, 1904
- Missoula, Montana, 1901, Renaissance Revival style
- Ritzville, Washington, 1910
- Sandpoint, Idaho, 1916
- Staples, Minnesota, 1909
- Toppenish, Washington, 1911 The Northern Pacific's Toppenish depot is now the Northern Pacific Railway Museum
- Trident, Montana, 1909, moved to Three Forks, Montana, July 27, 2011, for rehabilitation into a museum)
- Wallace, Idaho, 1902
- Yakima, Washington, c. 1912: The Northern Pacific built at least three depots in Yakima. The first when they began construction across Stampede Pass c. 1884, the second, larger wood structure in 1901 was alleged to have a clock tower, and the final depot in a style similar to that in nearby Ellensburg, Washington, c. 1912. The last was likely the Reed and Stem design. Another noted architect -- Cass Gilbert, designed the 1901 depot. This structure was later relocated to another part of town, and converted into an apartment building. As of 2010, it was still standing in Yakima, minus the clock tower. Because the Northern Pacific never installed clocks in a tower, instead they used their large Monad trademark (the ying-yang), adopted by the road in 1896. In addition to the 1901 depot at Yakima, Gilbert also designed the Northern Pacific's depots at Little Falls, Minnesota, Bismarck, North Dakota, and Fargo, North Dakota.

Several of their works are listed on the National Register of Historic Places. These are (with attribution):

- One or more works in Commercial District, Roughly bounded by Park, C, Clark, 3rd, and Callendar Sts. Livingston, Montana (Reed & Stem), NRHP-listed
- Fort Yellowstone, Mammoth Hot Springs, Wyoming; Norris, Wyoming; Gardiner, Montana, near Buffalo Lake, Idaho Mammoth Hot Springs, WY (Reed and Stem, Reamer, Robert), NRHP-listed
- Grand Central Terminal, 71–105 E. 42nd St. New York, New York (Reed & Stem), NRHP-listed
- Grand Central Terminal (Boundary Increase: Park Avenue Viaduct), 71-105 E. 42nd St., Park Ave. between E. 40th and E. 42nd Sts. New York, New York (Reed & Stern), NRHP-listed
- One or more works in Helena Railroad Depot Historic District, Roughly bounded by Railroad/Helena Aves., Gallatin St., N. Sanders St. and N. Harris St. Helena, Montana (Reed, Charles A.), NRHP-listed
- King Street Station, 3rd St., S. and S. King St. Seattle, Washington (Reed & Stem), NRHP-listed
- Morris Park Station, under Espalanade at Bogart and Colden Ave. and Hone Ave. Bronx, New York (Reed & Stem), NRHP-listed
- Northern Pacific Railroad Depot, Railroad and Higgins Ave. Missoula, Montana (Stem & Reed), NRHP-listed
- Northern Pacific Railway Depot, 410 E. Main Ave. Bismarck, North Dakota (Reed & Stem), NRHP-listed
- Northern Pacific Railway Passenger Depot, 606 W. Third St. Ellensburg, Washington (Reed & Stem), NRHP-listed
- Forest Lodge Library, 13450 Cty Hwy M Cable, Wisconsin (Stem, Allen H.), NRHP-listed
- New York, Westchester and Boston Railroad Administration Building, 481 Morris Park Ave. New York, New York (Stem, Allen H.), NRHP-listed

== Sources ==
- Cone, Rufus L., and Dick, James C. Electronic mail, June 14, 2011. Dr. Cone is author of several articles on the history of the Northern Pacific Railway for the Northern Pacific Railway Historical Association's quarterly The Mainstreeter. James C. Dick is volunteer archivist for the Northern Pacific Railway Historical Association Archives in St. Paul, Minn.
- Malby, Andy. Moving Day. Belgrade, Montana News. Accessed August 15, 2011. (Covers moving of Trident, Mont., depot to Three Forks, Mont., for use as a museum.)
- Nixon, Jeanne. Missoula Tour: The NP Depot. Accessed June 15, 2011.
- Cass Gilbert Society Northern Pacific Railway Depot - Yakima. Accessed June 14, 2011.
- Helena As She Was - Transportation via Rail. Accessed June 15, 2011.
- NP Railroad Depot Museum. Accessed June 14, 2011.
