= Bedford (surname) =

Bedford is an English toponymic surname which indicates someone from Bedfordshire County, and the name derived from the name of a Saxon monk 'Bede' combined with the old English ford 'a river crossing'. Notable people with the surname include:

- Barbara Bedford (actress) (1903–1981), American actress
- Barbara Bedford (swimmer) (born 1972), American former backstroke swimmer
- Brian Bedford (1935–2016), English actor
- Celia Frances Bedford (1904–1959), British artist
- David Bedford (1937–2011), British composer and musician
- David Bedford (athlete) (born 1949), English long-distance runner
- Dave Bedford (footballer) (1926–2017), Australian footballer
- Davis Evan Bedford (1898–1978), British physician
- Frances Bedford (born 1953), Australian politician
- Francis Bedford (photographer) (1815–1894), English photographer
- Francis Donkin Bedford (1864–1954), English book illustrator
- Francis Octavius Bedford (1784–1858), English architect
- Fred Bedford (1902–1972), English professional footballer
- Gerald Augustus Harold Bedford (1891–1938), British entomologist
- Harry Bedford (rugby) (1866–1929), rugby union footballer of the 1880s and 1890s for England and Batley
- Harry Bedford (music hall) (1873–1939), English music hall entertainer
- Harry Bedford (politician) (1877–1918), New Zealand politician
- Harry Bedford (footballer) (1899–1976), English footballer
- Harry Bedford (cricketer) (1907–1968), English cricketer
- Henry Bedford (educator) (1816–1903), English Catholic convert, educator and writer
- Henry Bedford (cricketer) (c. 1854–?), English cricketer
- Henry Edward Bedford (1860–1932), American painter and sculptor
- Herbert Bedford (1867–1945), British composer, author and artist
- Ian Bedford (1930–1966), English cricketer
- Jan Bedford (born 1945), Australian gymnast
- James Bedford (1893–1967), psychologist and the first person cryonically preserved
- John Bedford (c. 1720 – 1791), English iron worker and industrialist
- Kodie Bedford, Australian screenwriter
- Lou Singletary Bedford (1837–1920), American poet, author, editor
- Luke Bedford (born 1978), British composer
- Mark Bedford (born 1961), English musician, songwriter and composer
- Martyn Bedford (born 1959), British novelist and literary critic
- Olivia Cajero Bedford (1938–2022), American politician
- Paddy Bedford (c. 1922 – 2007), Australian artist
- Peter Bedford (politician) (born 1986), British politician
- Peter Bedford (sportsman) (born 1947), Australian rules footballer and cricketer
- Robert Bedford (1874–1951), English-Australian museum curator, scientist and entrepreneur (born Robert Buddicom)
- Sybille Bedford (1911–2006), German-born English writer
- Walter Bedford (1879–1939), English cricketer

== See also ==
- Admiral Bedford (disambiguation)
- Senator Bedford (disambiguation)
