= Henry Bedford =

Henry Bedford may refer to:

- Henry Bedford (educator) (1816–1903), English Catholic convert, educator and writer
- Henry Bedford (cricketer) (c. 1854–?), English cricketer
- Henry Edward Bedford (1860–1932), American painter and sculptor

== See also ==
- Harry Bedford (disambiguation)
