= Harry Bedford =

Harry Bedford may refer to:

- Harry Bedford (rugby) (1866–1929), rugby union footballer of the 1880s and 1890s for England and Batley
- Harry Bedford (music hall) (1873–1939), English music hall entertainer
- Harry Bedford (politician) (1877–1918), New Zealand politician
- Harry Bedford (footballer) (1899–1976), English footballer
- Harry Bedford (cricketer) (1907–1968), English cricketer

== See also ==
- Henry Bedford (disambiguation)
