= Main Concourse =

Primary concourse of Grand Central Terminal in New York City

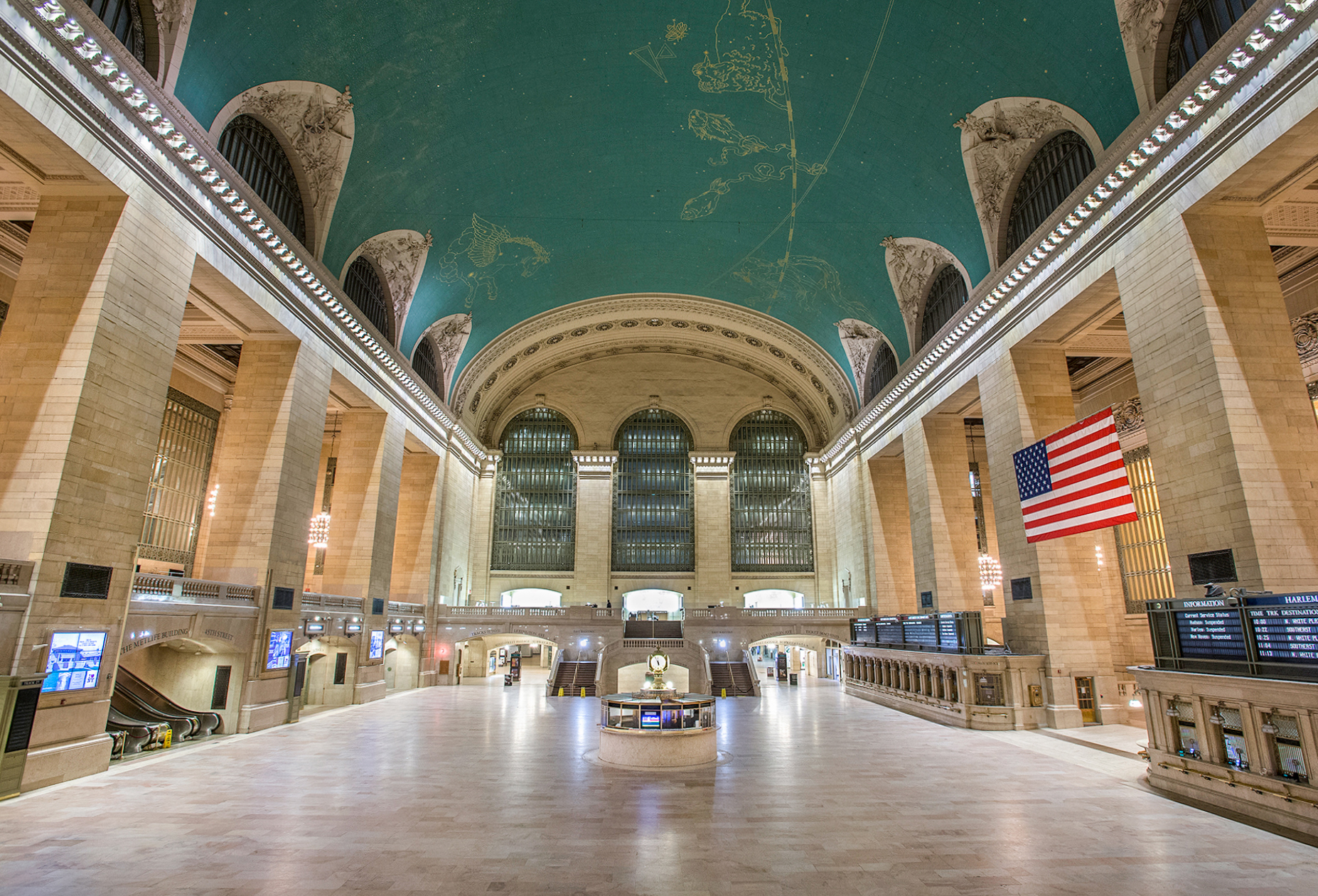
- Building: Grand Central Terminal
- Location: 89 East 42nd Street; Manhattan, New York City, U.S.
- Coordinates: 40°45′10″N 73°58′38″W
- Dimensions: 275 ft × 120 ft × 125 ft (84 m × 37 m × 38 m)
- Area: 35,000 sq ft (3,300 m^{2})
- Purpose: Concourse
- Operator: Metropolitan Transportation Authority
- Dedicated: February 2, 1913
- Style: Beaux-Arts
- Architect: Reed and Stem; Warren and Wetmore

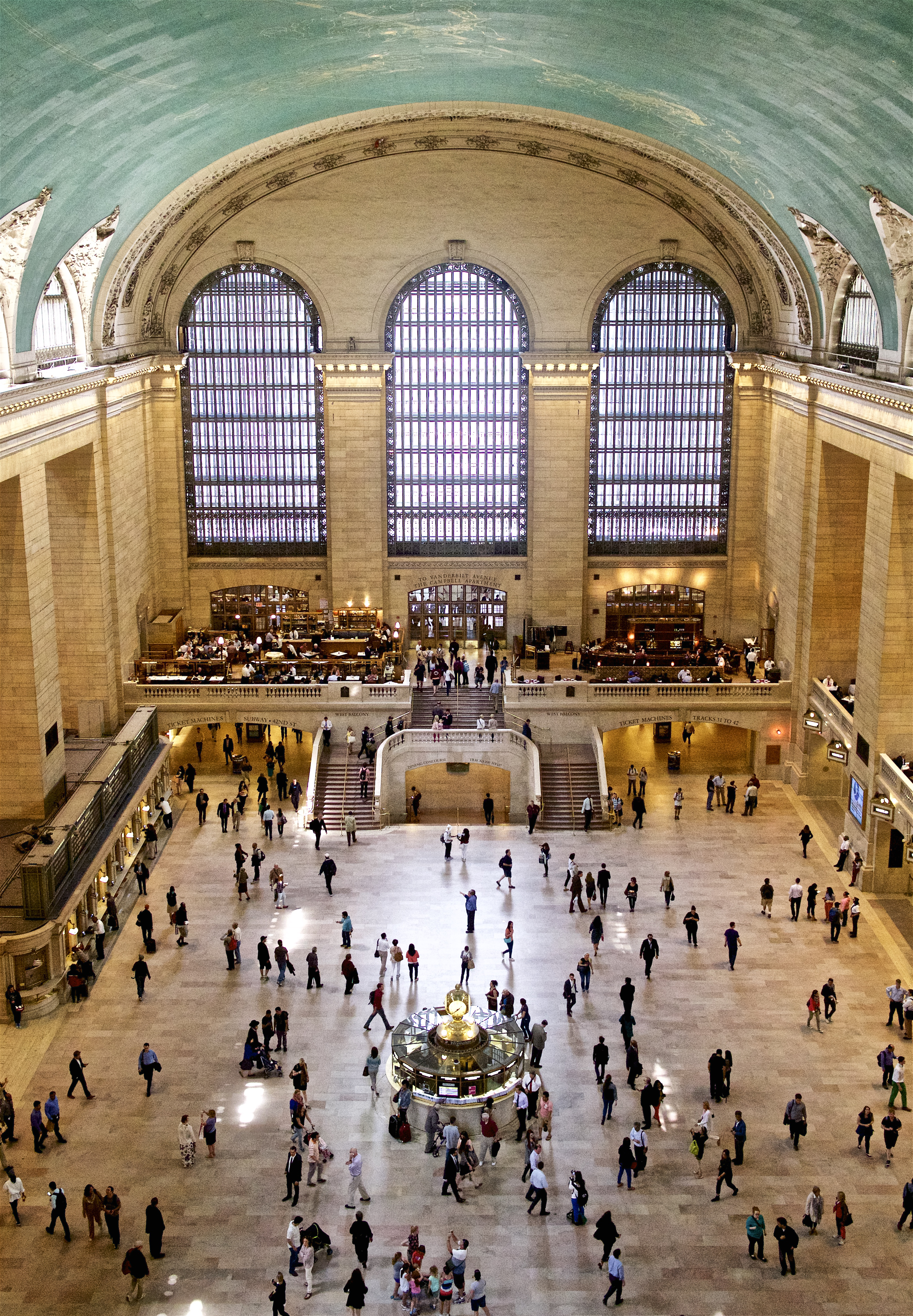
Afternoon pedestrian traffic in the Main Concourse

The Main Concourse is the primary concourse of Grand Central Terminal, a railway station in Midtown Manhattan, New York City. The space is located at the center of the terminal's station building.

The distinctive architecture and design of the Main Concourse helped earn several landmark designations for the station, including as a National Historic Landmark. The concourse, along with some other interior spaces, has been protected as an interior New York City Landmark since 1980. The room's Beaux-Arts design incorporates numerous works of art. The terminal is one of the world's ten most-visited tourist attractions, with 21.6 million visitors in 2018, excluding train and subway passengers.

The Main Concourse is located on the upper platform level of Grand Central, in the geographical center of the station building. The 35,000-square-foot (3,300 m^{2}) concourse leads directly to most of the terminal's upper-level tracks, although some are accessed from passageways near the concourse. The Main Concourse is usually filled with bustling crowds and is often used as a meeting place.

Opened with the rest of the terminal in 1913, the Main Concourse held numerous events, exhibitions, and other attractions over the next decades. In World War II, its east balcony became a United Service Organizations canteen. In 1944, its ceiling proved to be damaged beyond repair, and was covered over with a false ceiling, replicating the artistry of the original work. In 1967, the first train departure display was installed in the Main Concourse. The display, affectionately known as the Big Board, was replaced with more modern equipment several times (in 1985, 1996, and 2019). In the mid-20th century, the room started to deteriorate, its windows were darkened, advertisements were installed on its walls, and bank kiosks were placed on its floor. In the late 1990s, a restoration project overhauled the terminal, restoring the concourse nearly to its 1913 appearance. The biggest change was the addition of the east staircase, an element planned but never implemented until then. No major changes have been made since the overhaul finished in 1998.

== Layout and architecture ==
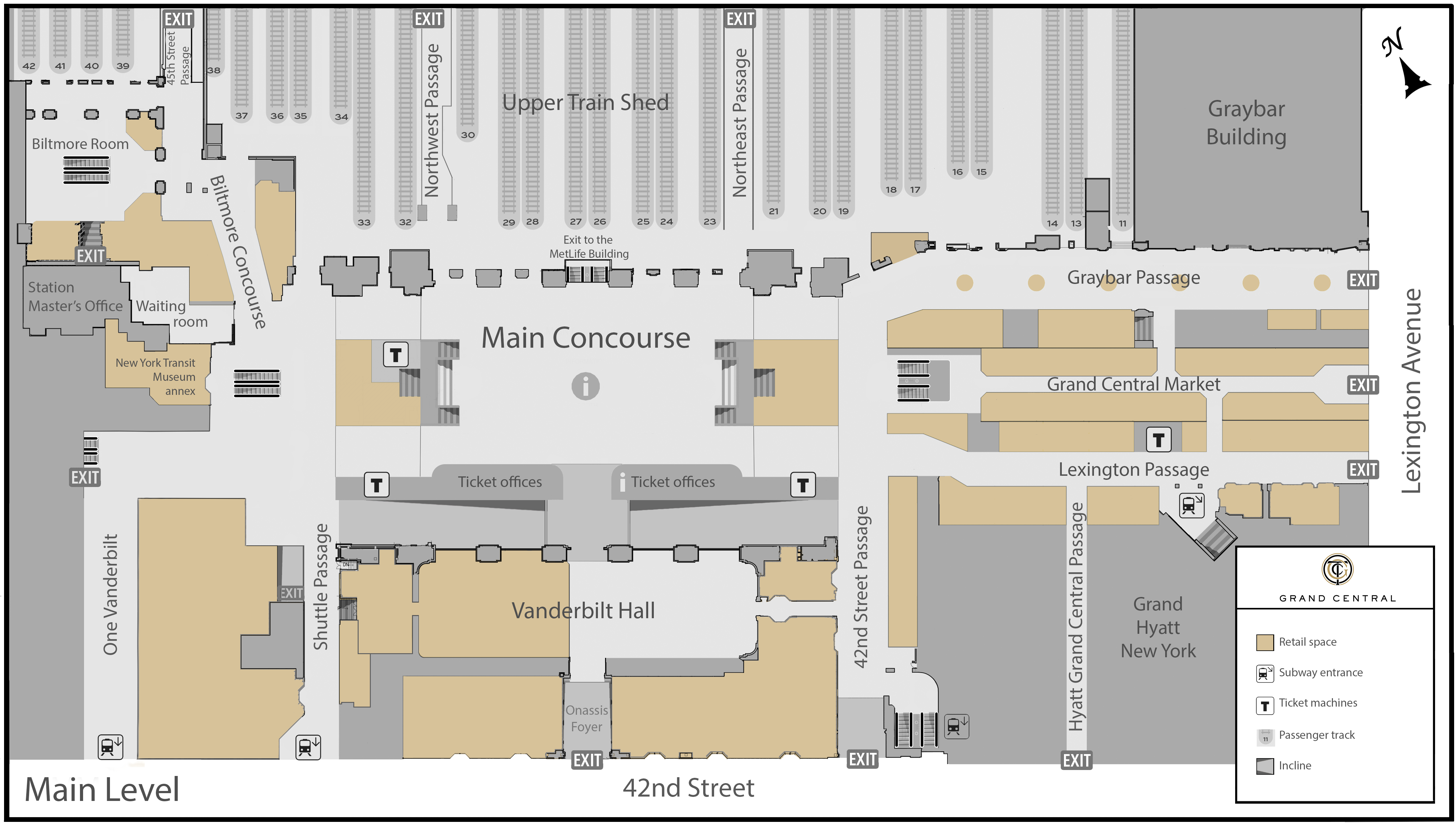
Floor plan of the main level of the terminal; the Main Concourse is roughly in the center

The Main Concourse, on the terminal's upper platform level, is located in the geographical center of the station building. The cavernous concourse measures 275 ft (84 m) long by 120 ft (37 m) wide by 125 ft (38 m) high; a total of about 35,000 square feet (3,300 m^{2}). Its vastness was meant to evoke the terminal's "grand" status.

The Main Concourse was deliberately placed at the same level as the mezzanine of the New York City Subway's Grand Central–42nd Street station; at the time of the terminal's construction, 80 percent of passengers transferred to and from the subway. The remainder of Grand Central Terminal was then designed around the floor level of the Main Concourse.

=== Iconography ===
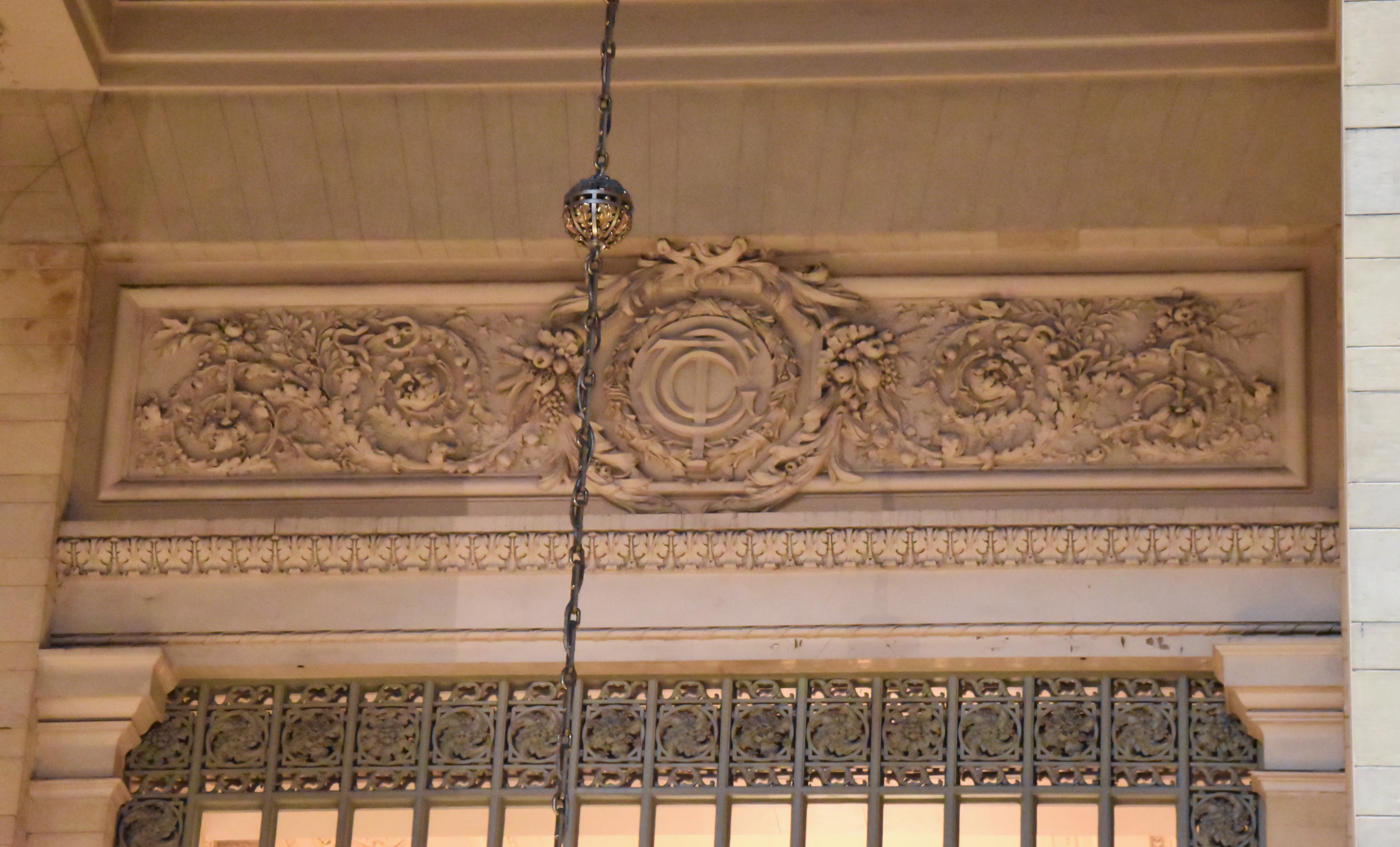
Frieze displaying the terminal's original logo

Many parts of the Main Concourse and rest of the terminal are adorned with sculpted oak leaves and acorns, nuts of the oak tree. Cornelius Vanderbilt chose the acorn as the symbol of the Vanderbilt family, and adopted the saying "Great oaks from little acorns grow" as the family motto. Among these decorations is a brass acorn finial atop the four-sided clock in the center of the Main Concourse. Other acorn or oak leaf decorations include carved wreaths under the Main Concourse's west stairs; sculptures above the lunettes in the concourse; metalwork above the elevators; reliefs above the train gates; and the electric chandeliers in the Main Waiting Room and Main Concourse. These decorations were designed by Sylvain Salières.

The overlapping letters "G", "C", and "T" are sculpted into multiple places in the Main Concourse and terminal, including in friezes atop several windows above the terminal's ticket office. The symbol was designed with the "T" resembling an upside-down anchor, intended as a reference to Cornelius Vanderbilt's commercial beginnings in shipping and ferry businesses. In 2017, the MTA based its new logo for the terminal on the engraved design; MTA officials said its black and gold colors have long been associated with the terminal. The spur of the letter "G" has a depiction of a railroad spike. The 2017 logo succeeded one created by the firm Pentagram for the terminal's centennial in 2013. It depicted the Main Concourse's ball clock set to 7:13, or 19:13 using a 24-hour clock, referencing the terminal's completion in 1913. Both logos omit the word "terminal" in its name, in recognition to how most people refer to the building.

=== Information booth and clock ===
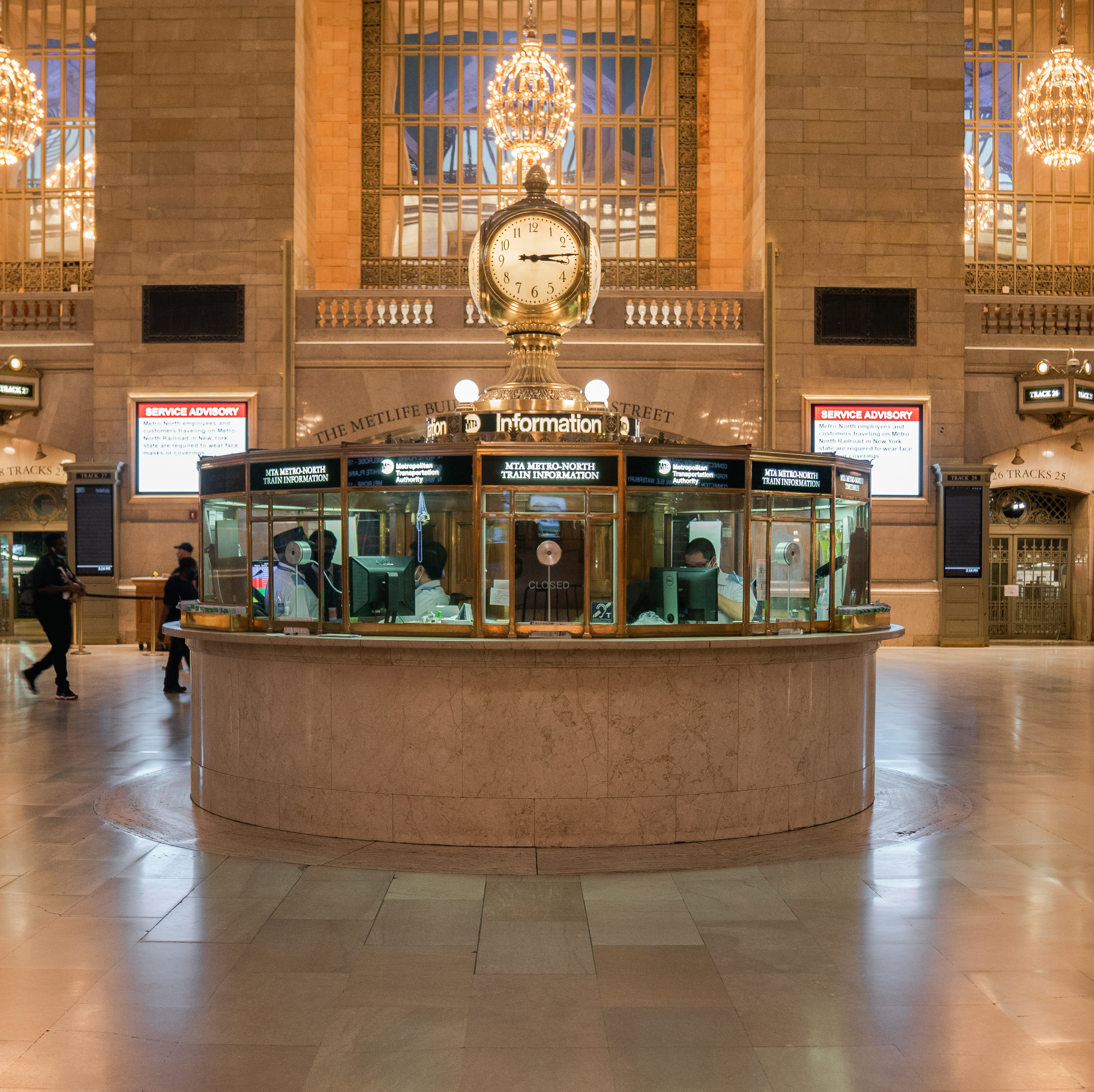
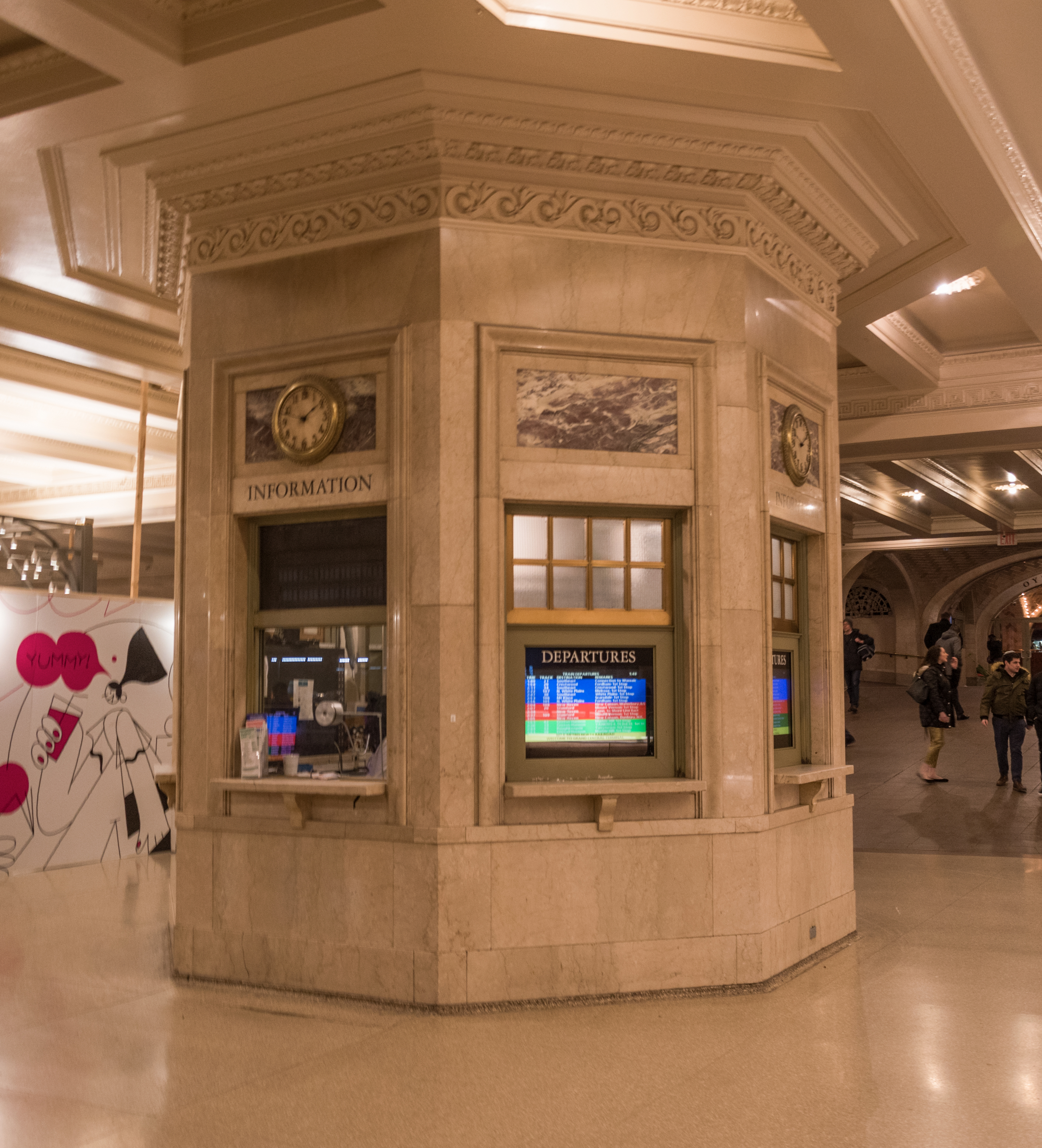
The Main Concourse information booth (left) and the Dining Concourse information booth (right). The two are connected by a spiral staircase.

The 18-sided main information booth is in the center of the concourse. Its attendants provide train schedules and other information to the public; in 2015, they fielded more than 1,000 questions an hour, according to an MTA spokesman. A door within the marble and brass pagoda conceals a spiral staircase down to a similar booth on the station's Dining Concourse. The Main Concourse booth originally had a simple counter surrounding the enclosed staircase and clock, though by the end of 1914 the entire booth was enclosed with a glass roof, and eventually with window panels on its sides.

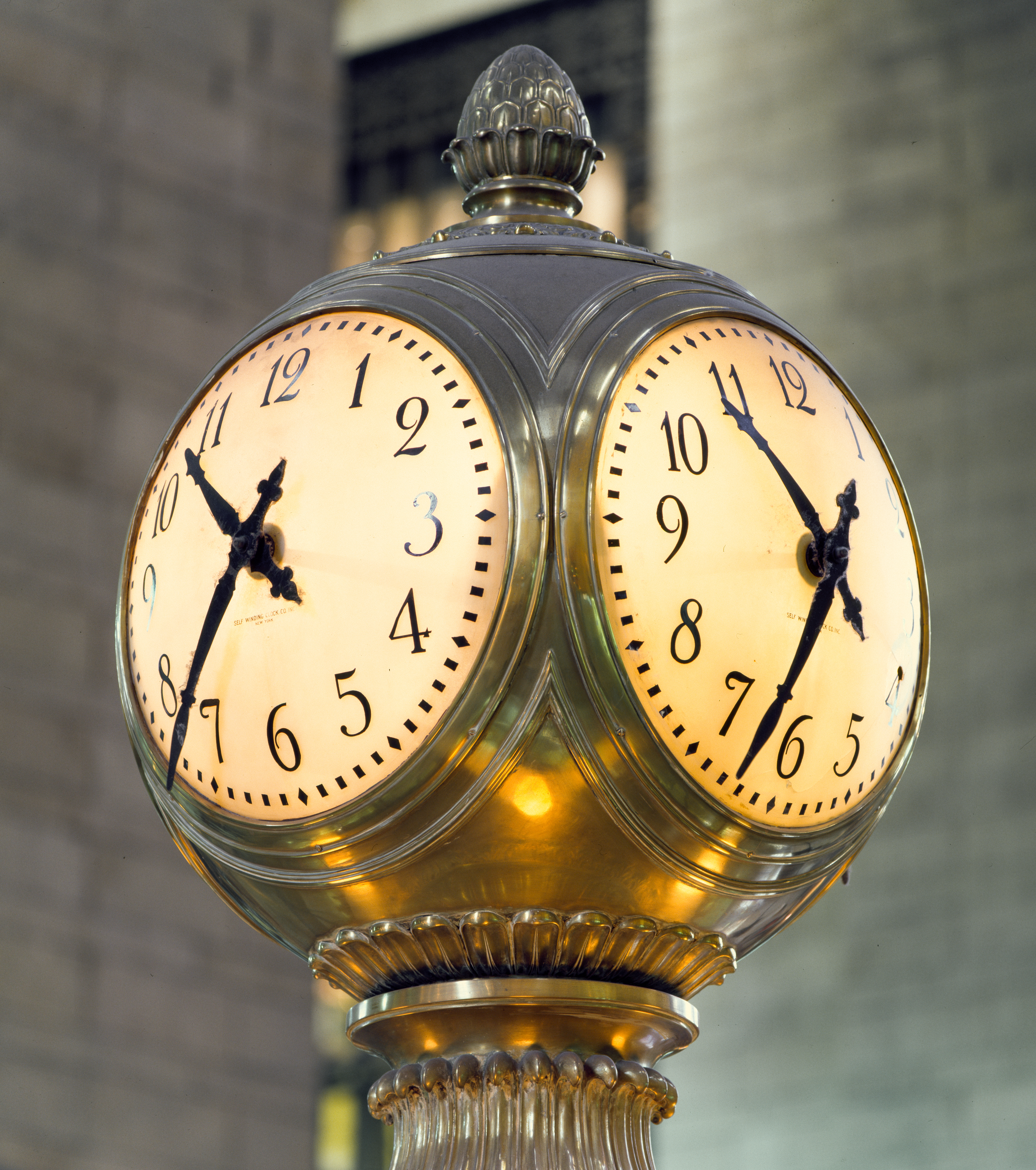
Main Concourse clock

The booth is topped by a four-faced brass clock, one of Grand Central's most recognizable icons. The clock was designed by Henry Edward Bedford and cast in Waterbury, Connecticut. Its mechanism was designed by the Self Winding Clock Company and built by the Seth Thomas Clock Company, along with several other clocks in the terminal. Each 24-inch (61 cm) face is made from opalescent glass, now often called opal glass or milk glass. An urban legend, which arose in news reports in the 1990s or even earlier, claimed that the clock faces were actually made of opal, a precious gem, and that renowned auction houses had estimated their worth at millions of dollars. This myth was spread by tour guides in the terminal, by its presentation as fact in Wikipedia from 2006 to 2013, and by major news publications into the present day. It was debunked by Untapped New York in 2020.

The clock was first stopped for repairs in 1954, after it was found to be losing a minute or two per day. One of the four original clock faces was damaged in 1968 by a police officer's bullet, while he chased members of the Youth International Party who staged a protest inside the terminal. The cracked face was removed in the 1990s during the terminal's restoration. It was replaced with a replica; the original is now part of the New York Transit Museum collection.

Along with the rest of the New York Central Railroad system's clocks, it was formerly set to a clock in the train dispatcher's office at Grand Central. Through the 1980s, they were set to a master clock at a workshop in Grand Central. Since 2004, they have been set to the United States Naval Observatory's atomic clock, accurate to a billionth of a second.

=== Departure and gate boards ===
The terminal's primary departure board is located on the south side of the concourse, installed directly atop the two sets of ticket windows. Colloquially known as the "Big Board", it shows the track and status of arriving and departing trains.

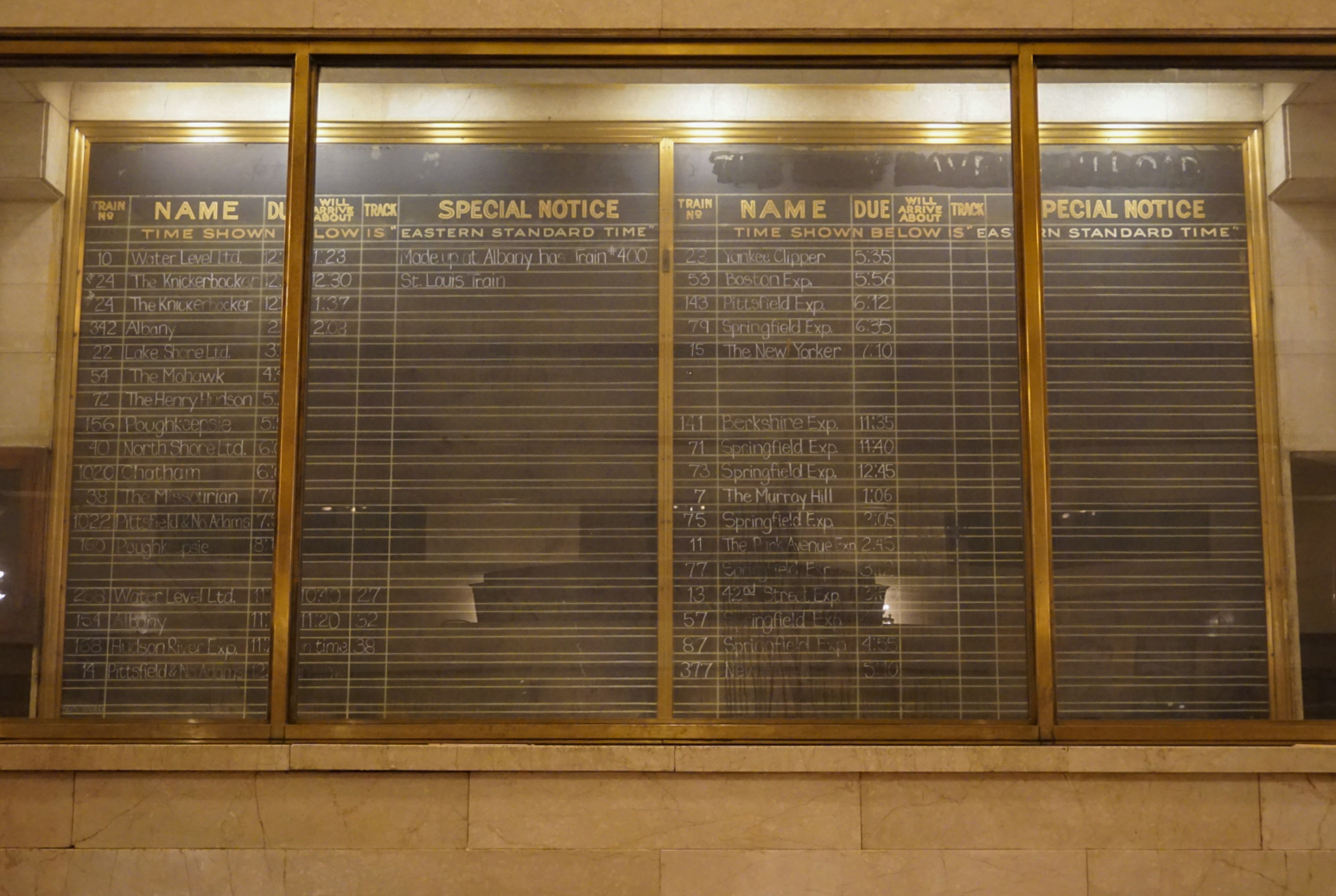
1913–1967 blackboard

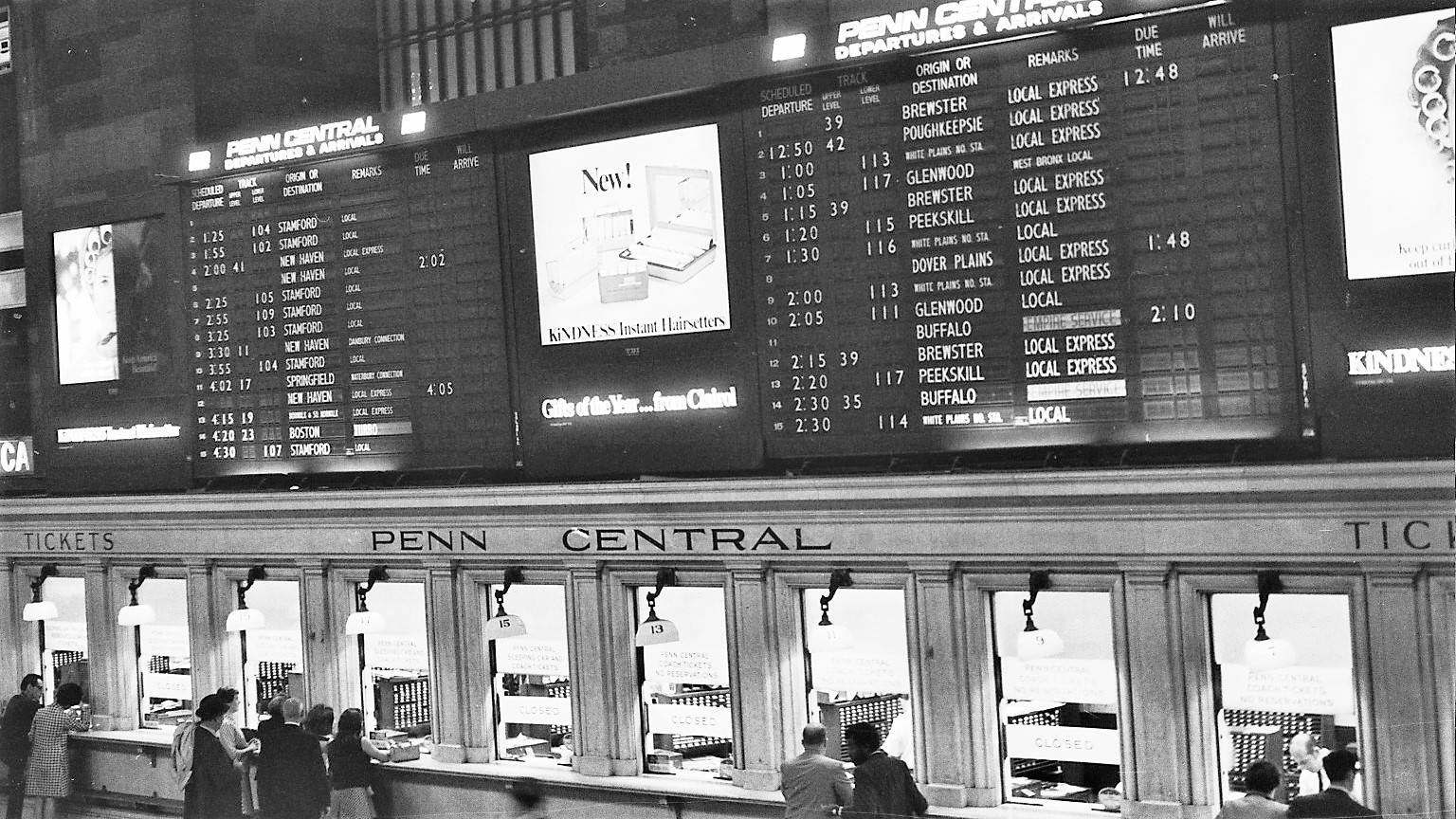
1967–1985 Solari board

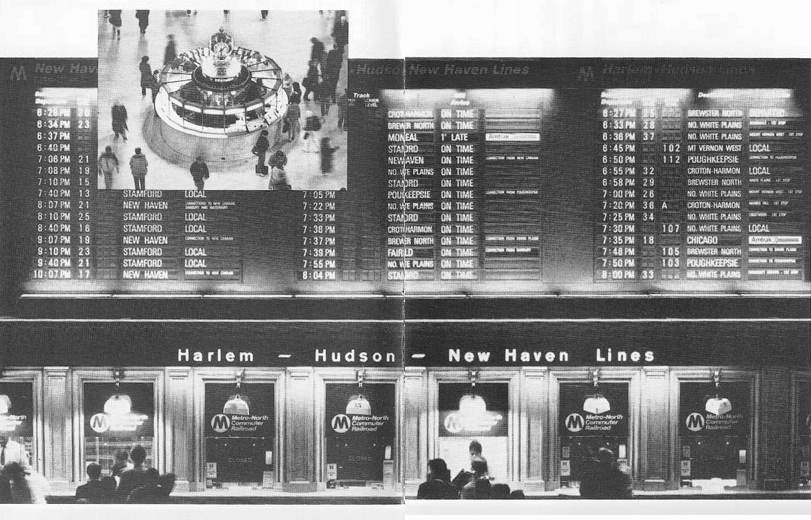
1985–1996 Omega board

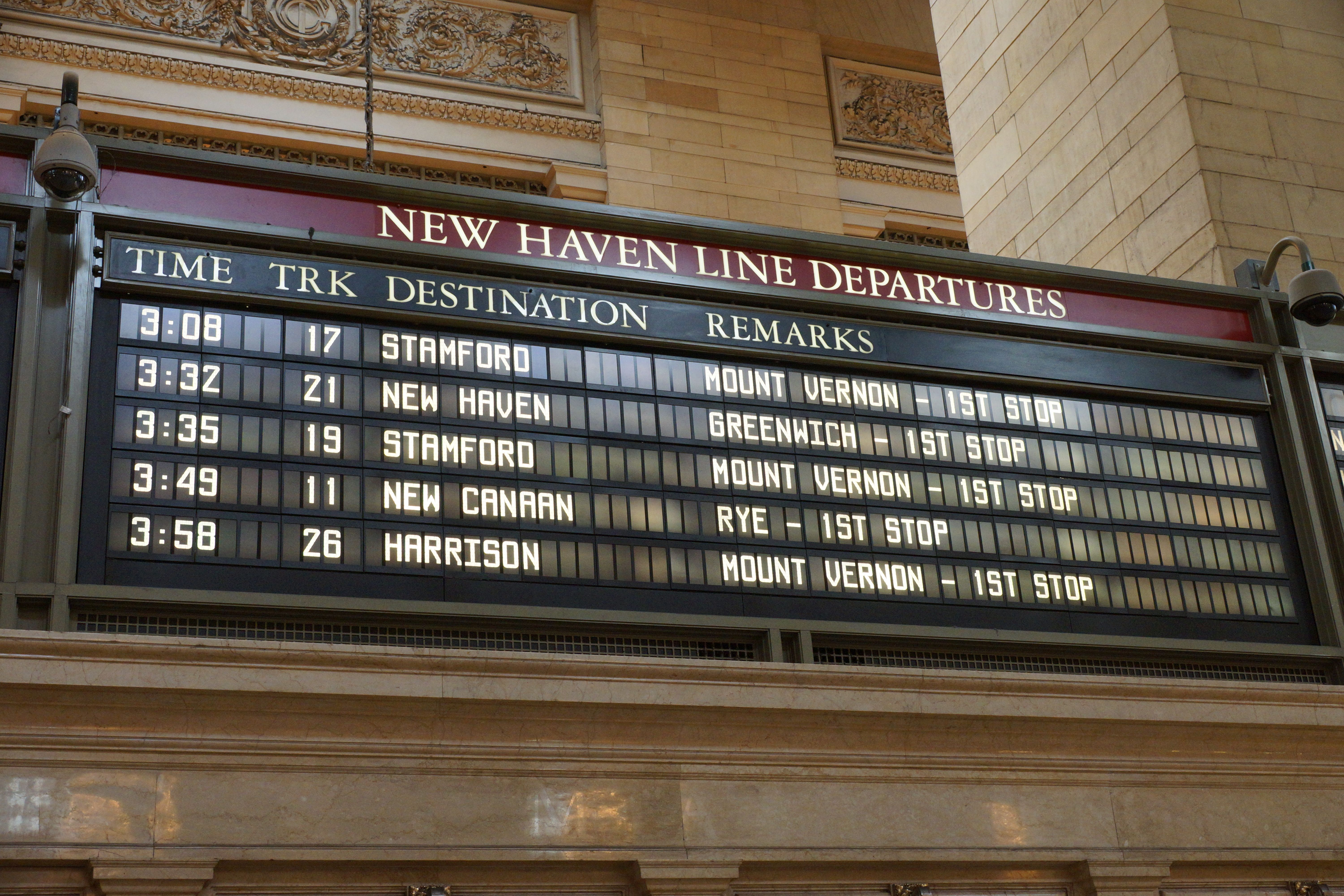
1996–2019 LCD board

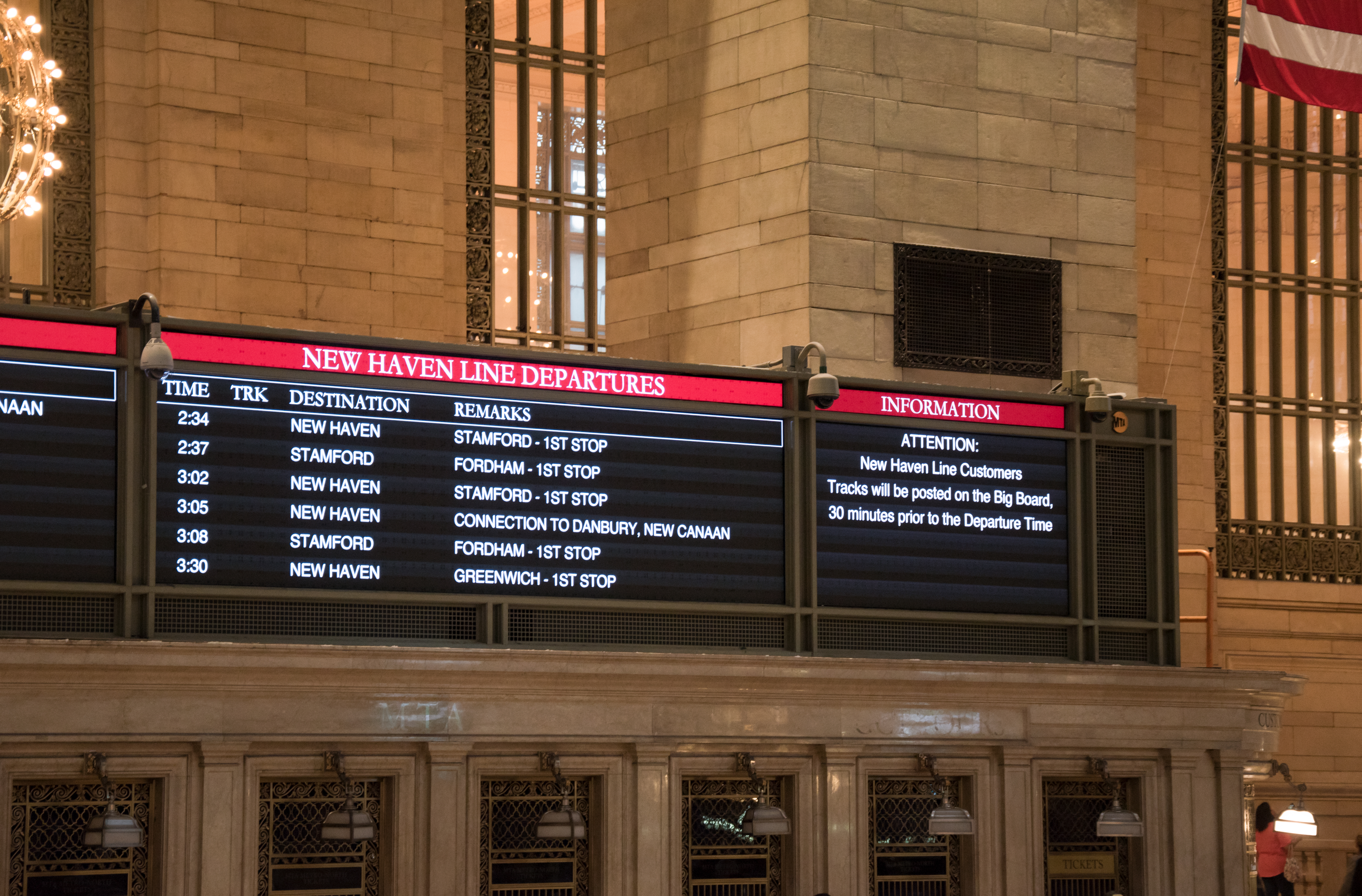
2019 LED replacement

There have been five departure boards used over the terminal's history: the 1913–1967 chalkboard, the 1967–1985 Solari board, the 1985–1996 Omega board, the 1996–2019 LCD board, and the 2019 fully digital display. For the first 54 years of the terminal's operation, train arrival and departure information was hand-chalked on a blackboard. The blackboard still hangs as a relic in its original place in the Biltmore Room, but in 1967, its function was supplanted by an electromechanical display in the main concourse over the ticket windows. This new display, dubbed a Solari board after its Italian manufacturer Solari di Udine, showed train information on rows of flip panels that made a distinctive flapping sound as they rotated to reflect changes. In 1985, the Solari board was replaced with the more technologically advanced Omega board, with flip panels controlled by a computer database of train information instead of manual inputs. It was built by watchmaker Omega SA to a design by Advanced Computer Systems of Dayton, Ohio, which also installed it. This board was removed during a terminal renovation in July 1996; it was replaced several months later with liquid-crystal displays that replicated the analog look of the older boards, yet were the first to span over both the east and west ticket offices. Between March and September 2019, the LCD boards — whose software had become unavailable — were removed from their housings and replaced by LED video wall screens. Designed by the MTA and New York's State Historic Preservation Office, the LED displays are brighter, easier to read, and ADA-compliant; they are also the first of the boards to offer real-time updates to train information. Commuter complaints about the new displays were published in the news, as had complaints over the three prior board replacements, in 1967, 1985, and 1996.

There are also arrival and departure displays at each of the platform gates, about 93 in total. Originally these were cloth curtains with train information stitched onto them, posted at the platform entrances. The signs were eventually replaced with flip panels, replaced again with the installation of the Omega Board in 1987, and supplanted again by LCD panels, which were replaced between 2017 and 2020.

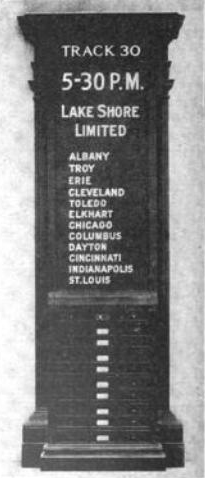
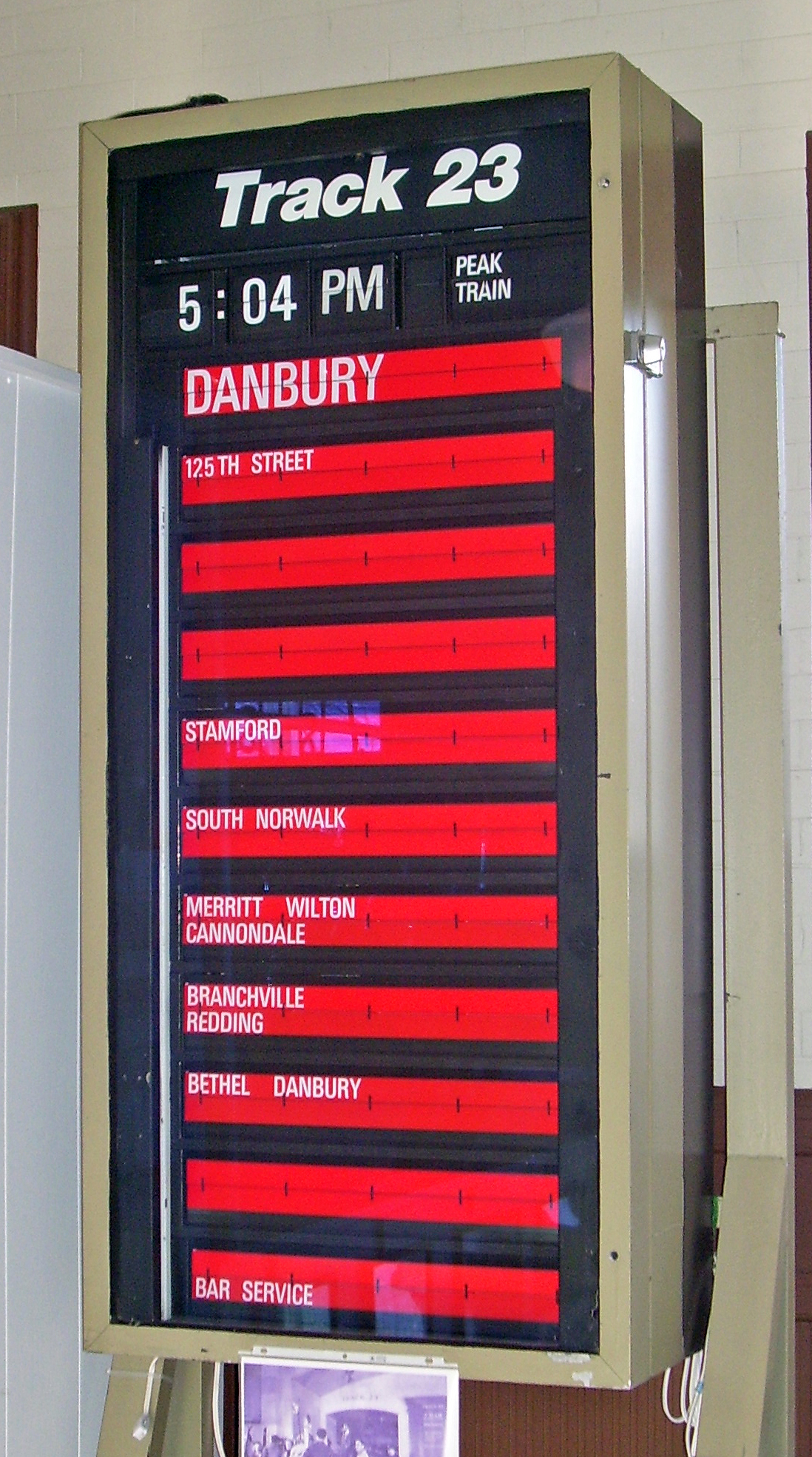
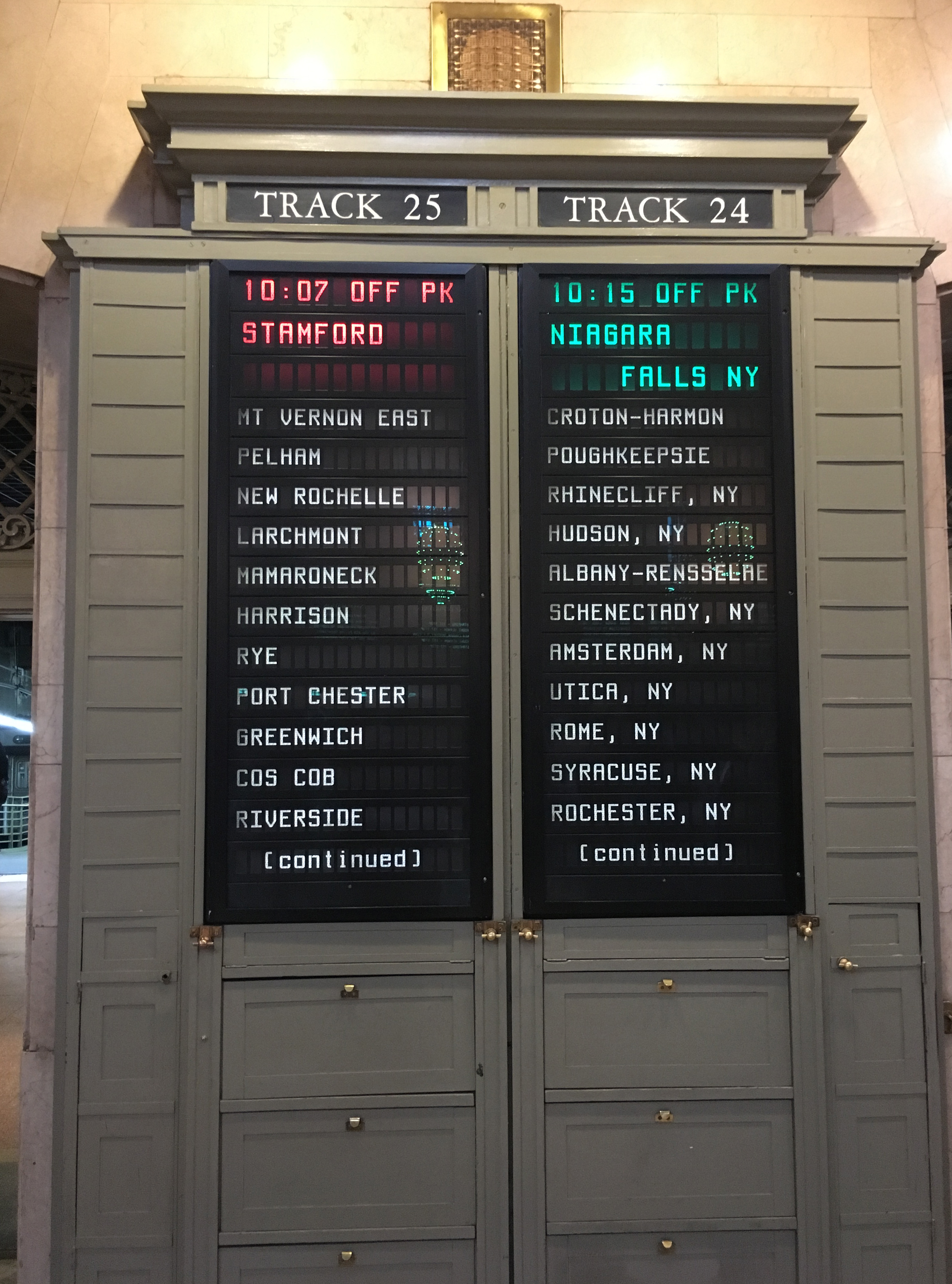
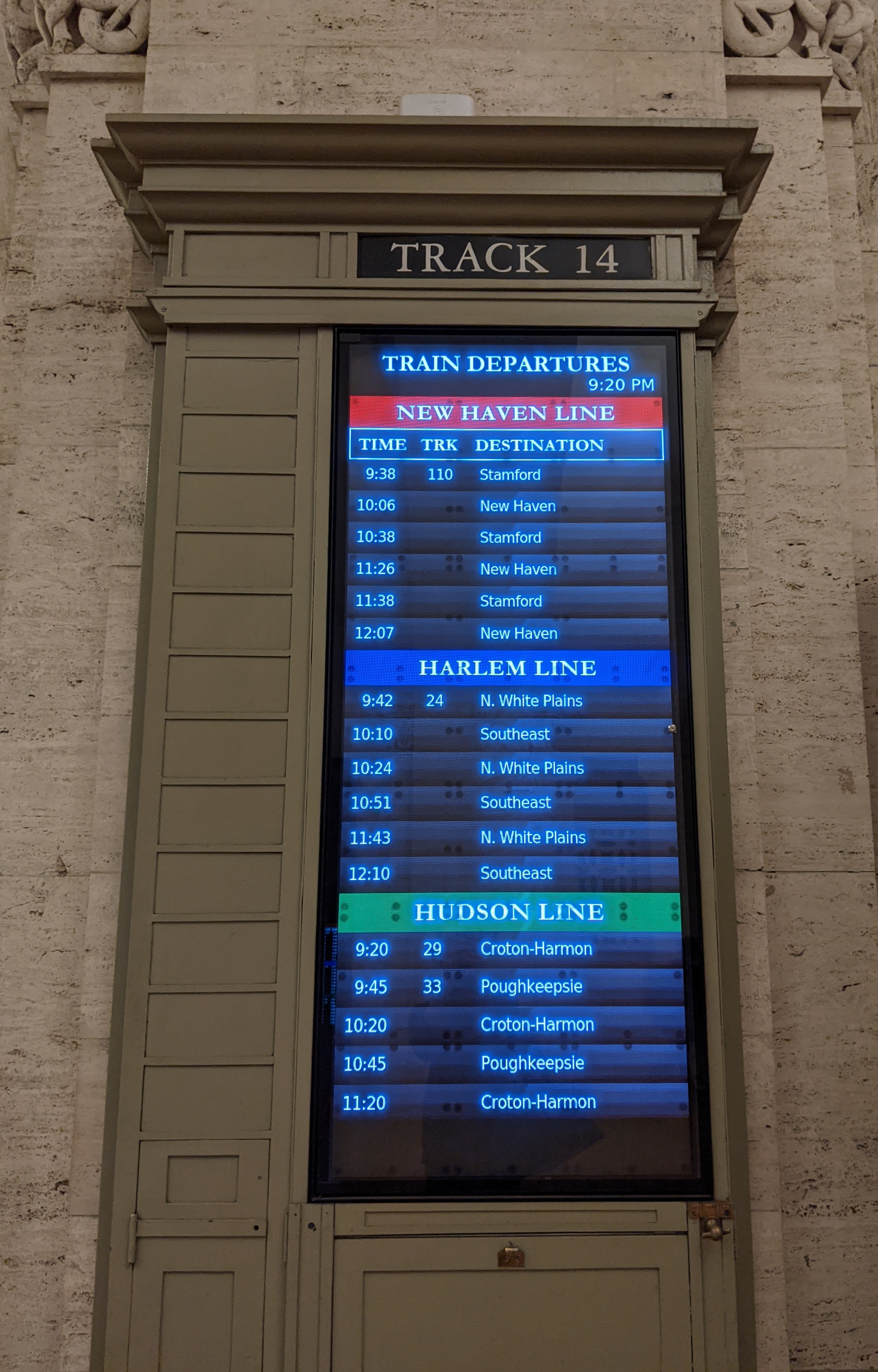
Left to right:
• 1913–1967 train gate display
• 1967–1985 Solari gate display (out of cabinetry)
• 1996–2020 LCD
• 2019–present fully digital display

=== Triple windows ===
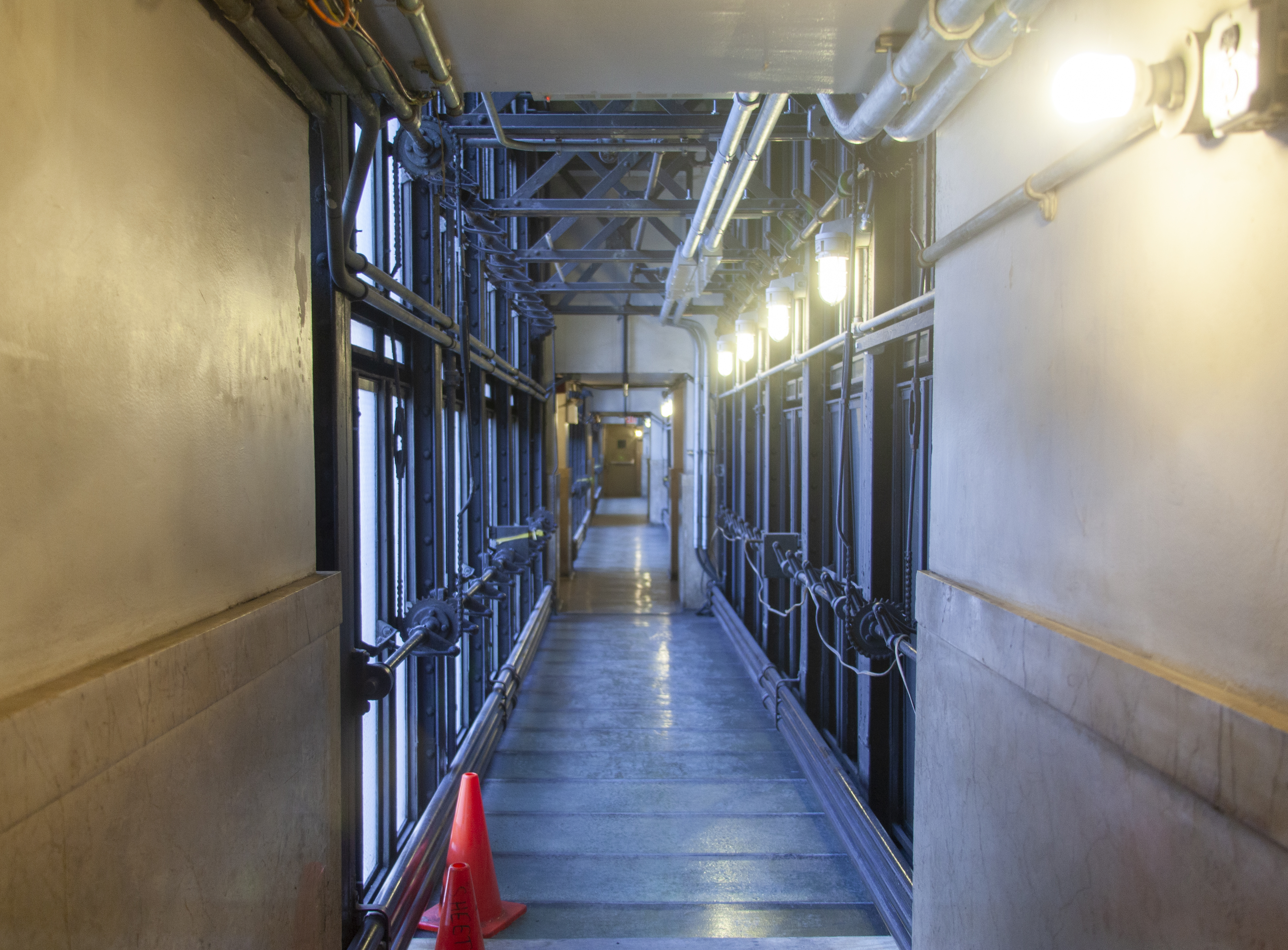
One of the walkways in the Main Councourse east windows

Natural light comes from large windows in the concourse's east and west walls. Each wall has three round-arched windows, about 60 feet (18 m) high, identical in size and shape to the three on the terminal's south facade. The design was inspired by the Palais Garnier in Paris. Catwalks, used mostly for maintenance, run across the east and west windows. Their floors are made of semi-transparent rock crystal, cut two inches (51 mm) thick. These windows were designed to open, allowing cross-breezes through the terminal, though they have not been opened in decades.

=== Ticket windows ===
Two sets of ticket offices span the south side of the room, on the east and west of the entryway from Vanderbilt Hall. Many have been closed or repurposed since the introduction of ticket vending machines.

=== Ceiling ===
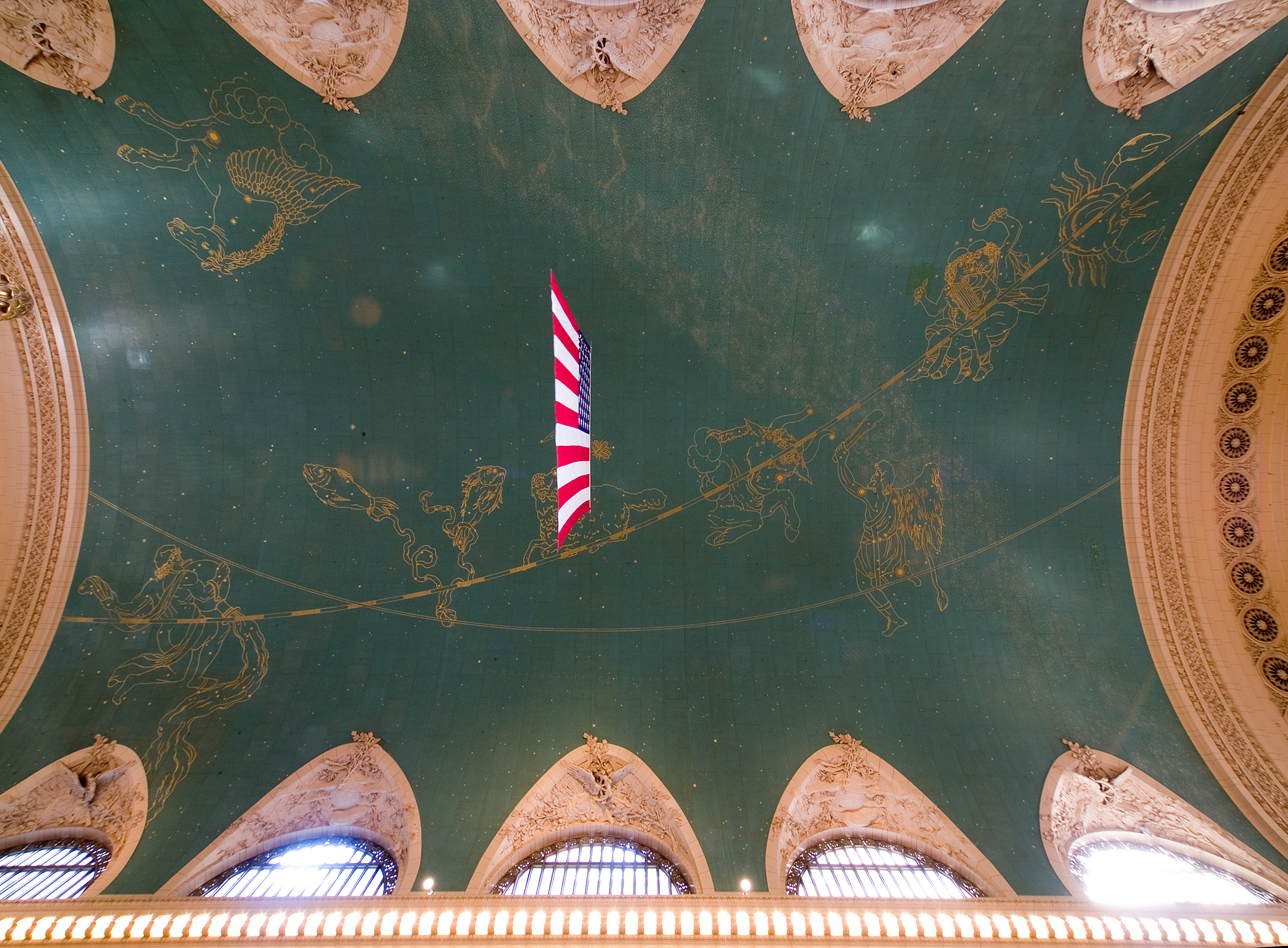
Main Concourse ceiling

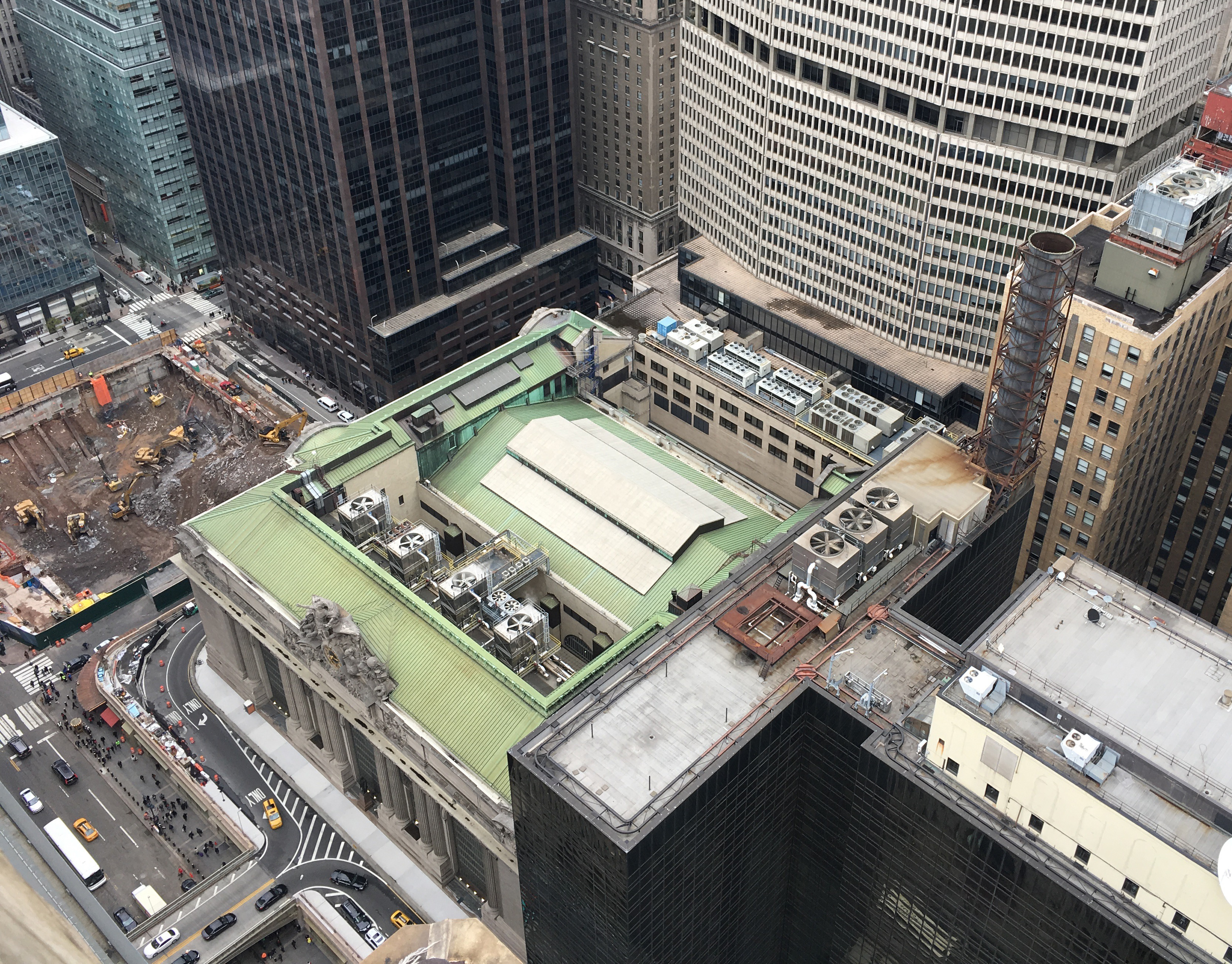
Monitor roof of the Main Concourse, seen in the center of the terminal structure

The Main Concourse's ceiling is an elliptical barrel vault, with its base at an elevation of 121.5 feet and its crown at 160.25 feet. A skylight was originally supposed to be installed to provide light into the terminal, and accommodations were made for a large ceiling light, in case an office building were to be constructed over the terminal.

A false ceiling of square boards, installed in 1944, bears an elaborate mural of constellations painted with more than 2,500 stars and several bands in gold set against a turquoise backdrop. It is a less-detailed version of an earlier mural painted directly on the ceiling itself. The original mural, conceived in 1912 by architect Warren and painter Paul César Helleu and executed in 1913 by Brooklyn's Hewlett-Basing Studio, became water-damaged and faded by the 1920s. In 1945, New York Central covered it with cement-and-asbestos boards and a new version of the mural. Both the original mural and its mid-century copy contain several astronomical inaccuracies: the stars within some constellations appear correctly as they would from earth, other constellations are reversed left-to-right, as is the overall arrangement of the constellations on the ceiling. Though the astronomical inconsistencies were noticed promptly by a commuter in 1913, they have not been corrected in any of the subsequent renovations of the ceiling.

There are half-moon clerestory windows on the north and south sides, with carvings by Salières, alternately depicting a globe adorned with Mercury's staff and a winged wheel that symbolizes the speed of the railway, adorned with lightning bolts to symbolize the line's then-recent electrification. Both designs include laurel and oak branches. These windows were covered over with black paint for decades, until the first major renovation of the terminal in 1988. The reason for the painting over is not fully clear; while many modern sources attribute it to blackout paint to avoid Germans targeting the station during World War II, others have claimed it to be leftover from filming inside the concourse. Before it was confirmed the darkening was caused by paint, Metro-North staff supported the theory that the darkening was from decades of dirt or pigeon droppings.

=== Balconies ===
The Main Concourse has balconies on its north, west, and east sides, overlooking the main floor. Its east and northeast balconies house an Apple Store. The southern end of the west balcony includes Cipriani Dolci, a restaurant and bar that is part of Cipriani S.A. The west and northwest balconies also housed a Michael Jordan's Steakhouse for years; the space is currently vacant.

=== Entrances and exits ===
The concourse, in the terminal's center, leads north to its train shed as well as an escalator, placed centrally on the north wall, leading up to the MetLife Building. There is only one entrance from the south end – a wide bridge spanning over the Oyster Bar ramps leading into Vanderbilt Hall. Passageways also lead from the west and east ends of the concourse, on either side of the west and east sets of stairs. These passageways lie underneath the east and west balconies, with shops and ticket machines along the walls, and lead to additional passageways that largely make up the station interior.

==== Staircases ====
Two nearly-identical sets of staircases are placed on either side of the concourse space. The east and west sets each have central stairwells leading down to the Dining Concourse, flanked by sets of stairs leading up to the balconies. The concourse was originally designed to have both sets of staircases, though a change in design led to only the west staircase having been built by the time the terminal opened. During the terminal's restoration in the 1990s, the east staircase was added. It uses the same stone as the west staircase, as well, as a similar design (modified for ADA compliance, and to show close observers that it is not original). The staircases were modeled after those of the Palais Garnier in Paris.

=== Other details ===
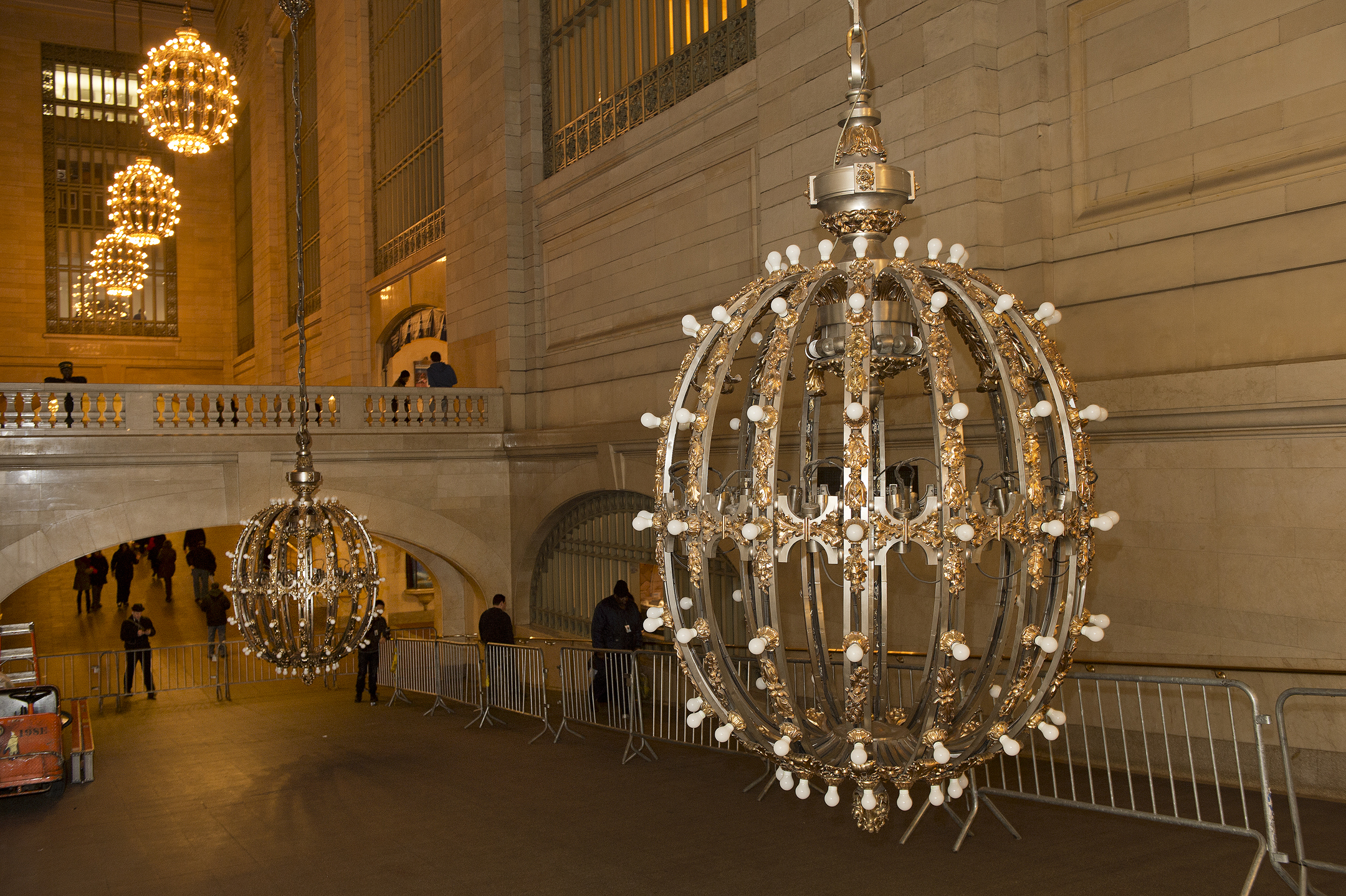
The concourse chandeliers lowered for cleaning in 2013

The concourse floor is made of pink Tennessee marble.

The concourse is lit by ten globe-shaped chandeliers in the Beaux-Arts style, each of which weighs 800 pounds (360 kg) and contains 110 bulbs.

Underneath the east and west balconies lie two intricately carved marble water fountains. The fountains, which date to the terminal's opening, still operate and are cleaned daily, though they are rarely used.

The concourse's large American flag was installed there a few days after the September 11 attacks on the World Trade Center.

The four corners of the Main Concourse have roughly square towers, lobbies for the office tower proposed to be built atop the terminal since its planning began. The four towers each contain a bank of four elevators, along with intricate staircases.

=== Historical elements ===
The Main Concourse has featured numerous advertisements, displays, and kiosks on its floor since the terminal's opening. Among the long-term elements was a massive illuminated clock, in place from 1959 to the late 1980s. Additionally, Kodak displayed a large photographic display, the Colorama, over the east balcony from 1950 to 1989.

== History and uses through time ==
While the Dining Concourse was completed and opened early, the Main Concourse was completed in 1913, and opened along with the rest of the terminal. It held numerous events, exhibitions, and other attractions over the coming decades.

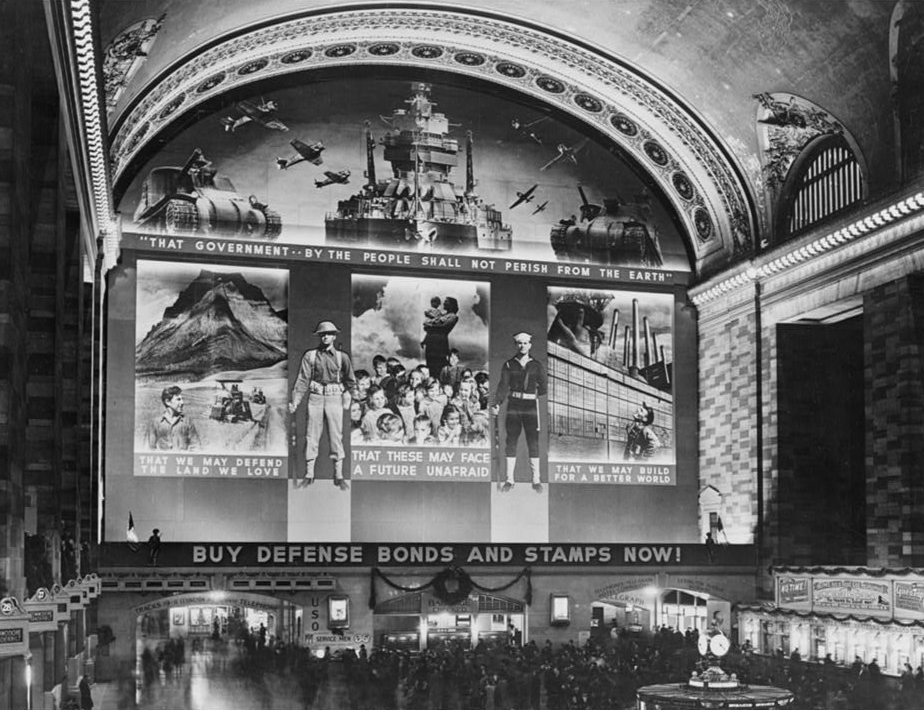
1941 Farm Security Administration mural to promote the sales of war bonds

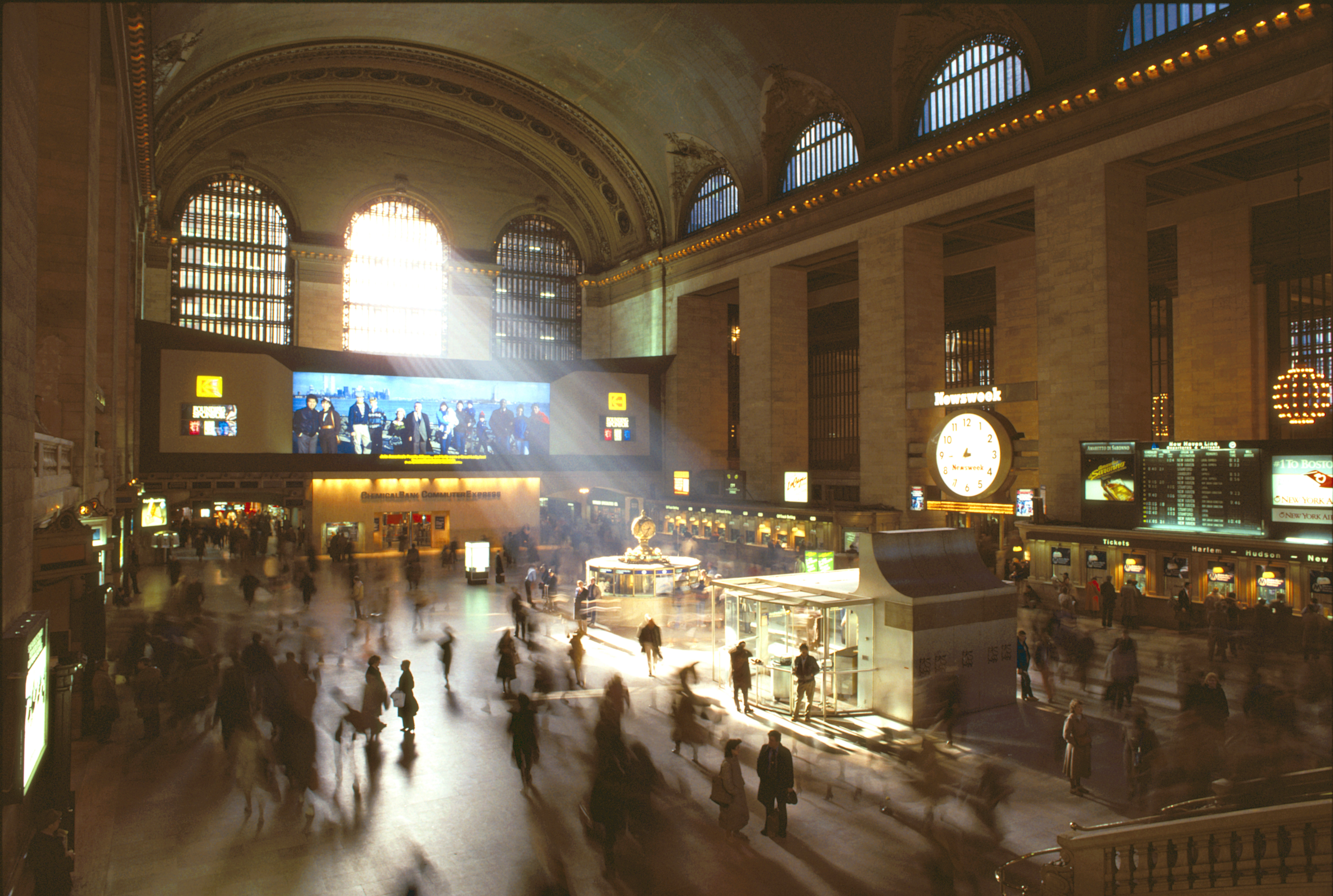
The Main Concourse in 1986, featuring the Kodak Colorama, the illuminated clock, and two banks

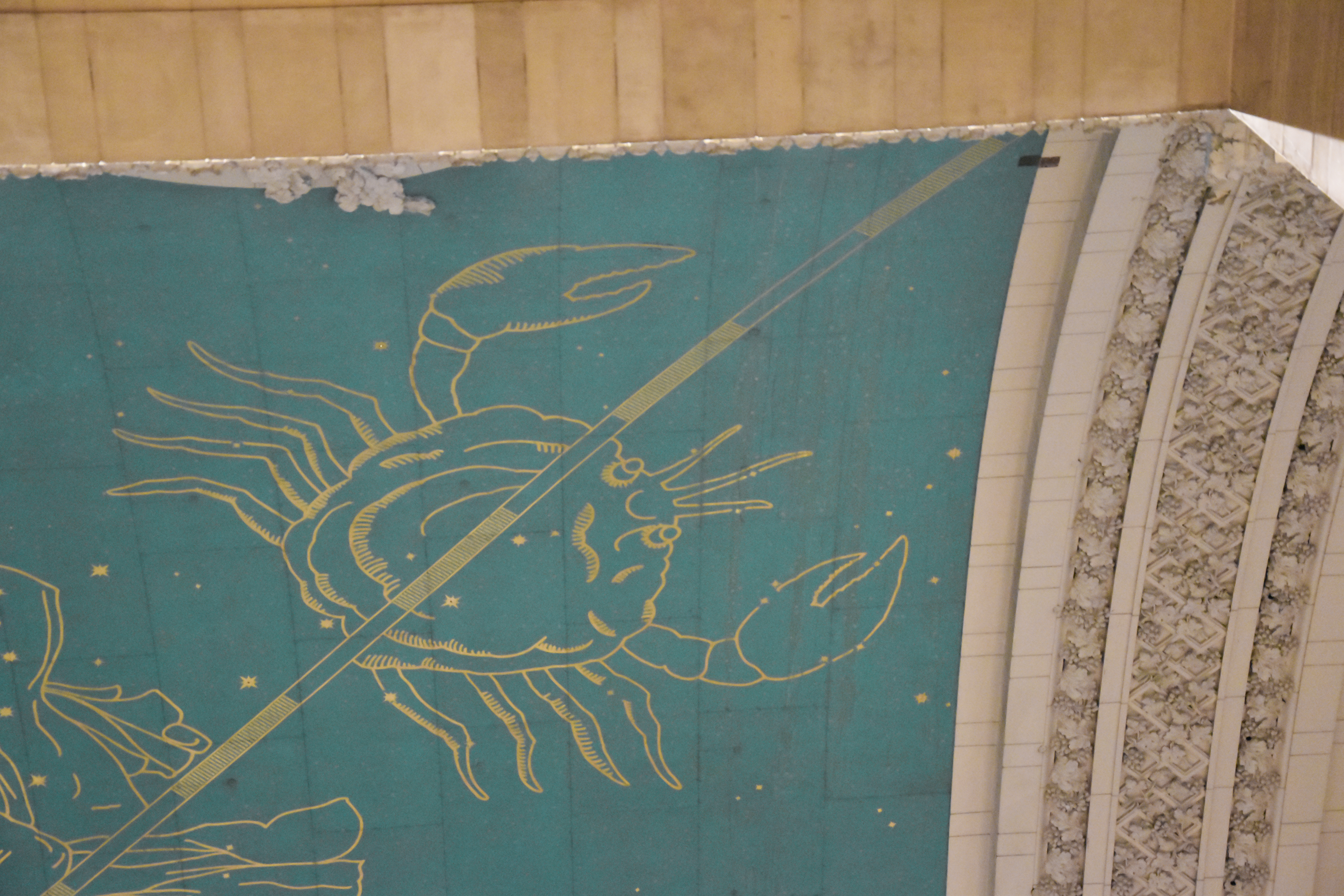
A single patch remains uncleaned following the ceiling's restoration; the Cancer constellation points toward it

During World War II, the terminal became heavily used by troops moving across the United States. Due to Grand Central's importance in civilian and military transit, many of the terminal's windows were covered with blackout paint, which would prevent aerial bombers from easily detecting the building. The war also prompted the Farm Security Administration to install a 118 ft × 100 ft (36 m × 30 m) mural on the Main Concourse's east wall in 1941. The mural, which had a montage of photographs, was part of a campaign to sell war bonds, and its unveiling was a nationally broadcast event that also drew 3,000 people on-site. In 1943, this mural was replaced by another, 75 by 30 feet (22.9 m × 9.1 m), also installed over the east wall. A large flag also hung in the Main Concourse honoring the 21,314 New York Central Railroad employees that participated in the war. The terminal also hosted a canteen operated by the United Service Organizations. Known as the Service Men's Lounge, the space on the east balcony had pool and ping pong tables, a piano, lounge chairs, and lunch counters. The terminal was used for military funeral processions as well.

In 1944 its ceiling proved to be damaged beyond repair, and was covered over with a false ceiling, replicating the artistry of the original work. In 1967, the first train departure display was installed in the Main Concourse. The display, affectionately known as the Big Board, was replaced with more modern equipment several times (1985, 1996, and 2019). Since the mid-20th century, the room started to deteriorate, as its windows were darkened, advertisements were installed on its walls, and bank kiosks were placed on its floor. In the late 1990s, a restoration project overhauled the terminal with a significant focus on the concourse, making it appear nearly like it did in 1913. The most major change was the addition of the east staircase, an element planned but never implemented until then. Since the renovation was completed in 1998, the concourse has been maintained to keep its original overall appearance. The building's purchase by the MTA in 2020 has ensured its well-kept state for the foreseeable future.

=== Uses ===
The size of the Main Concourse has made it an ideal advertising space. During World War II, a large mural with images of the United States military hung in the concourse, and from the 1950s to 1989, the Kodak Colorama exhibit was a prominent fixture. A thirteen-and-a-half-foot-diameter (4.1 m) illuminated clock hung in the Main Concourse at the entrance to the main waiting room from the 1960s to the 1990s. The clock, sometimes referred to as "Big Ben", had chimes, and after 1986, news and stock information. The clock was sponsored by at least five companies; its first and most significant was Westclox. All of these advertisements and fixtures were removed around the time of the terminal's renovation in the 1990s; only four advertisement screens remain on the concourse, each about 7 by 6 feet (2.1 m × 1.8 m).

The Main Concourse has also been used as a gathering venue. In the 1960s, the terminal's tenant CBS installed a CBS News television screen above the ticket offices to follow the spaceflights of Project Mercury; thousands would gather in the Main Concourse to watch key events of the flights. Politicians such as U.S. presidents Calvin Coolidge and Harry S. Truman; presidential candidates Thomas Dewey and Robert F. Kennedy; and governor Herbert Lehman have also held events within the concourse. The Main Concourse has also been used for memorials, including events to commemorate U.S. ambassador to France Myron T. Herrick and former first lady Jacqueline Kennedy Onassis after their deaths; celebrations for Martin Luther King Jr. Day; and an impromptu memorial created after the September 11 attacks in 2001. Several celebrations have also taken place at the terminal, such as a celebration for the New York Giants after they won the NFL championship in 1933; an event for the Brooklyn Dodgers in 1941; and several large parties and New Year's celebrations.

Various special exhibits and events have also been held at the Main Concourse throughout the years.

== Art ==
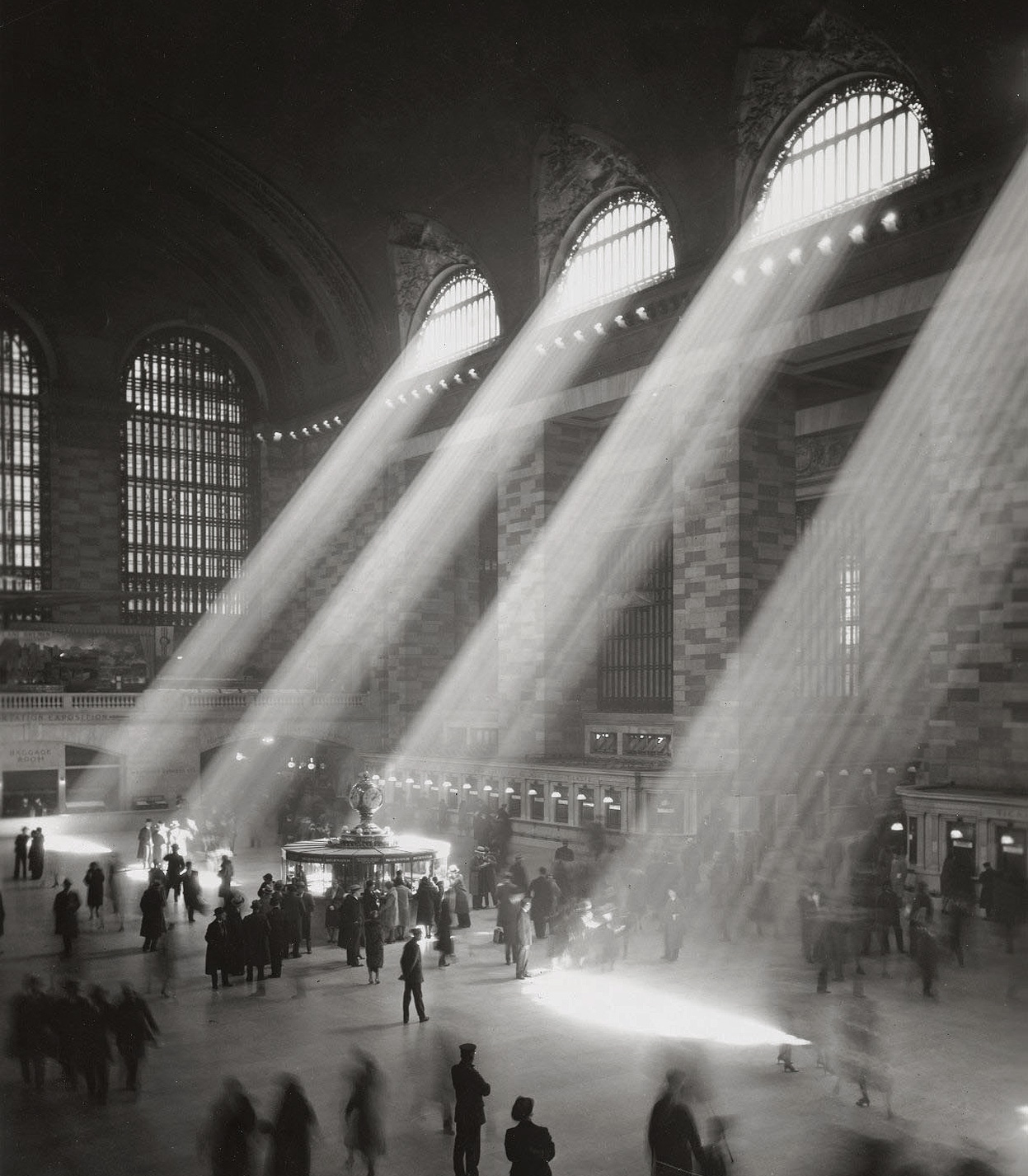
Rays of light streaming into the concourse, c. 1930

The Main Concourse is one of the most-photographed places in New York City and the United States. One of the most famous photographs of the space shows light streaming from its clerestory windows down to the floor. The work is reproduced online through hundreds of different images, with variations in angles, cropping, flipping, filters, and watermarks, as well as the author and date attributed to the works. Photographer Penelope Umbrico collected a sample of such images in Four Photographs of Rays of Sunlight in Grand Central, on display in the terminal's Dining Concourse.

== Architectural influence ==
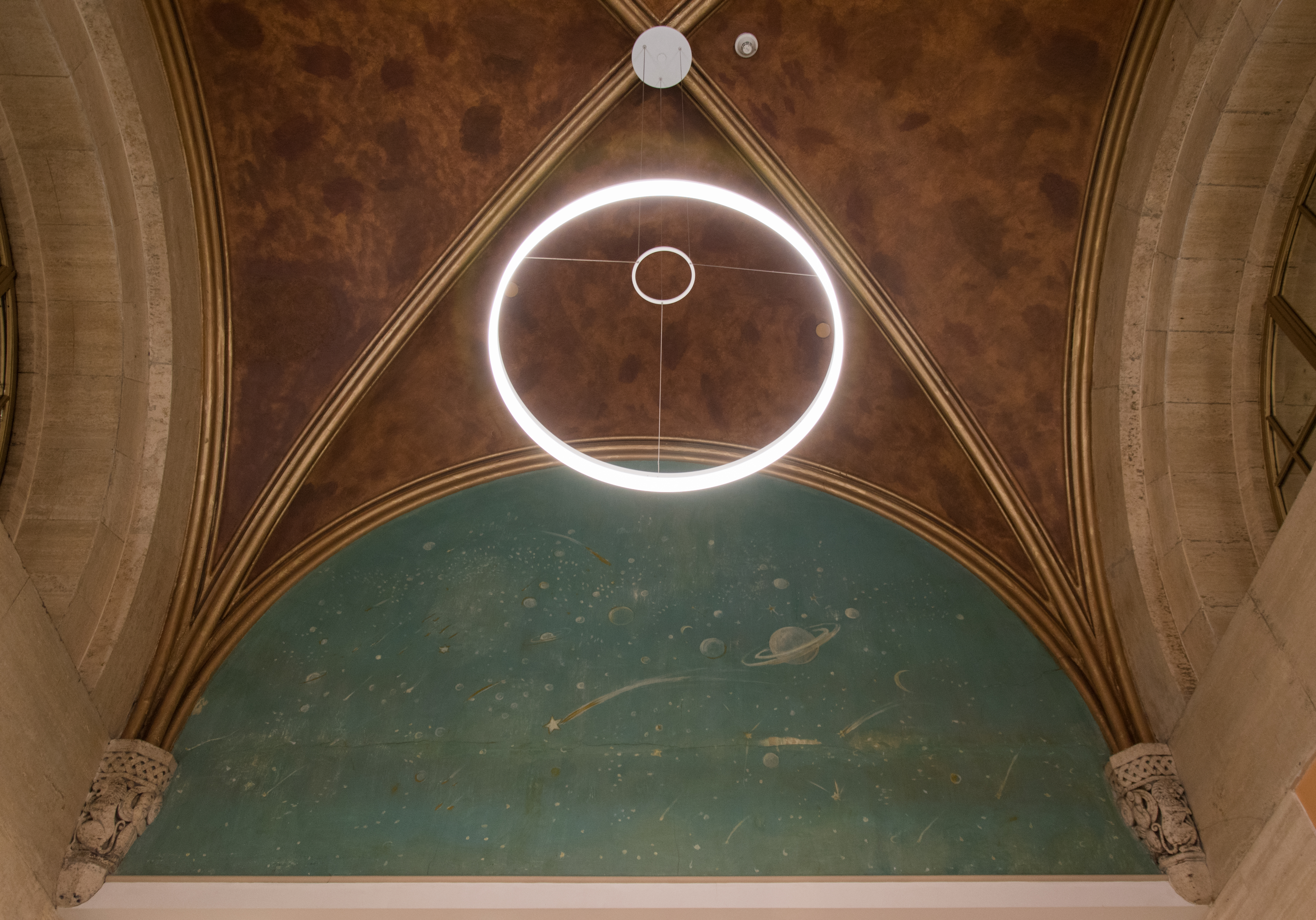
Central Cellars mural

The Main Concourse inspired multiple works of architecture and art. These include the nearby Biltmore Hotel (designed by Warren & Wetmore and built in 1913), which held a palm court modeled after the Main Concourse. The building was gutted by developers in 1981, and although preservationists managed to secure an agreement to approximately re-create the space, a new agreement in 1983 prompted a $500,000 donation to a landmarks fund instead.

The concourse's architecture, including its central clock, is depicted on the stage of Saturday Night Live, an NBC television show. The soundstage reconstruction of the terminal in Studio 8H was first installed in 2003.

An additional inspiration taken from the Main Concourse is at the terminal's wine-and-liquor store Central Cellars. The space was formerly the Grand Central Theatre or Terminal Newsreel Theatre, open from 1937 to around 1979. The theater lobby featured an astronomical mural, which has similar colors and style to the Main Concourse ceiling. A renovation in the early 2000s removed a false ceiling, revealing the mural as well as the theater's projection window.
