= David Bedford (disambiguation) =

David Bedford (1937–2011) was an English composer and musician

David Bedford may also refer to:

- David Bedford (athlete) (born 1949), English long-distance runner
- Dave Bedford (footballer) (1926–2017), Australian footballer
