= Kodak Colorama =

Photographic display

Colorama
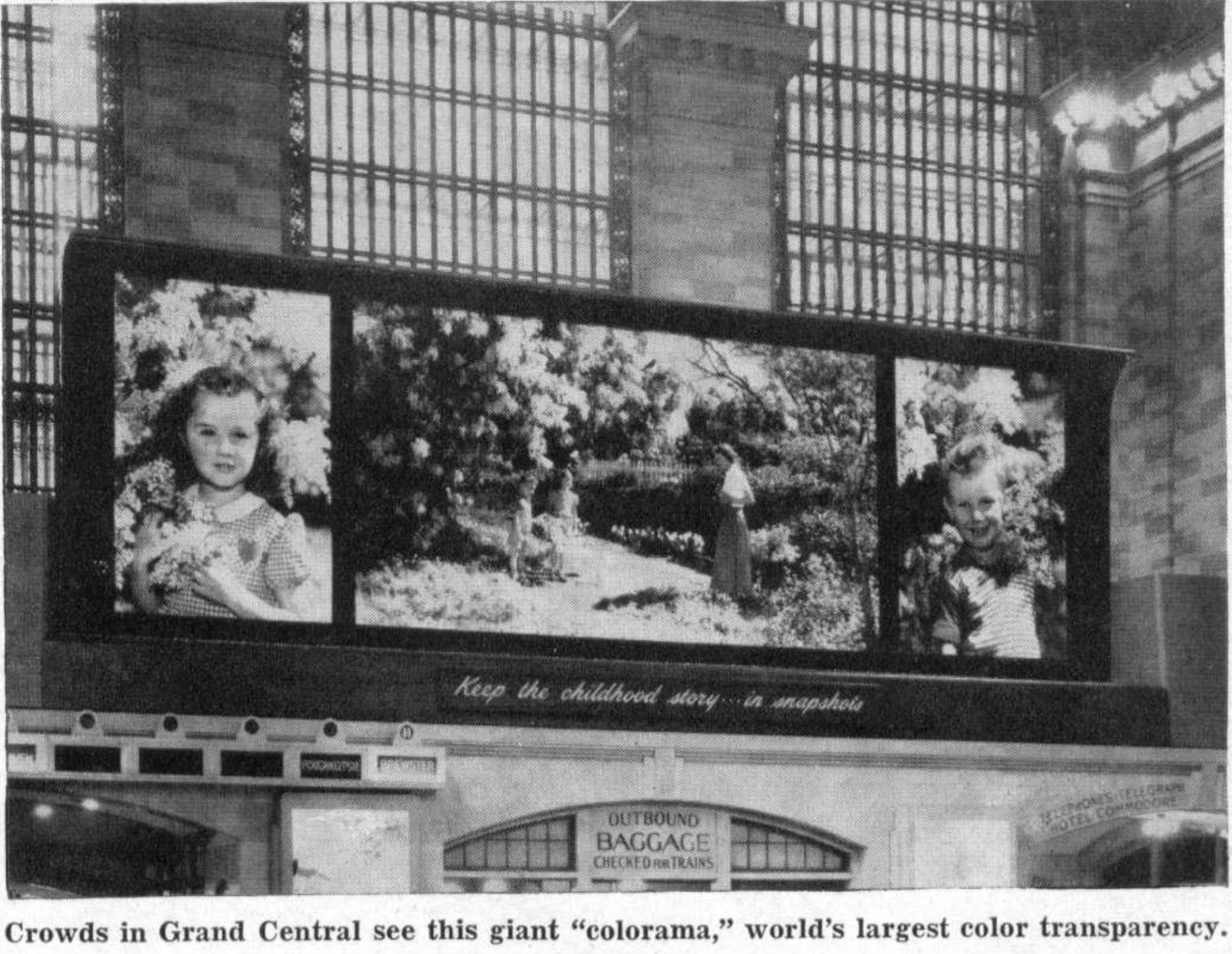
- The Colorama as first installed, 1950
- Status: Defunct
- Genre: Photography
- Date: 1950-1990
- Location: Grand Central Terminal's Main Concourse east balcony

The Colorama was a large photographic display located on the east balcony inside New York City's Grand Central Terminal from 1950 to 1990, with 565 being made. Used as advertisements by the Eastman Kodak Company, the photographs were backlit (with a mile of tubing) transparencies 18 feet (5.5 meters) tall by 60 feet (18 meters) wide. The photographs were described as "The World's Largest Photographs".

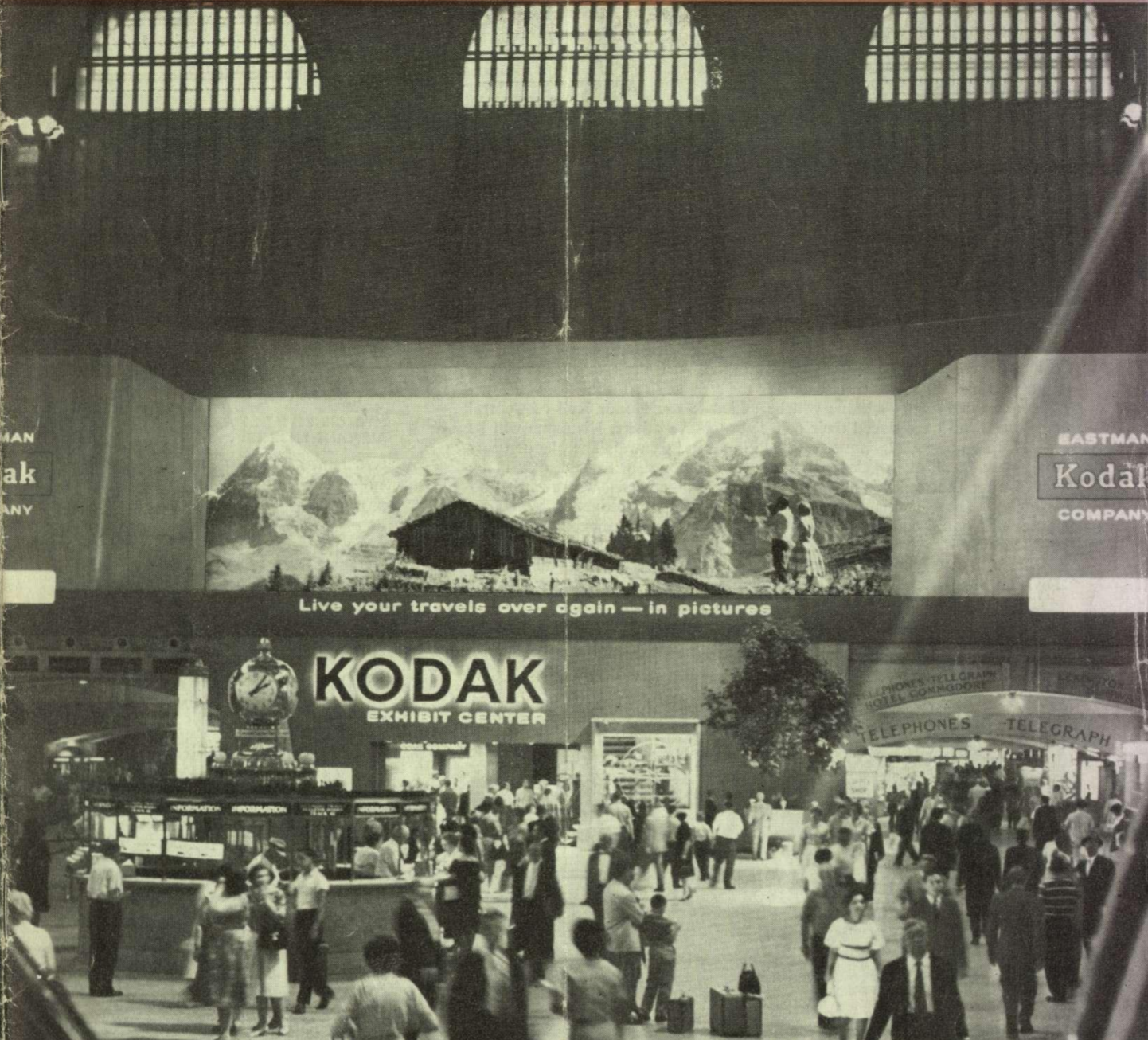
Newly darkened Main Concourse windows behind the Colorama and Kodak Exhibit Center, 1961
