= Gaston and Andree =

Gaston and Andree were a duo of British adagio dancers and gymnasts, who were popular performers in variety shows in the 1930s, and later became theatrical producers. They were Jimmy Gaston (born James Thomas; c.1887–1966) and Rosemary Andree (born Rose Wallis; c.1909–1974).

== Biography ==
James Thomas was the son of a Welsh dairy farmer. He initially became a wrestler, but before the First World War, under the name Jimmy Wood, worked as a gymnastic act with Arthur Cragg, one of the Cragg family of acrobats. After the end of the war, he formed his adagio act with a succession of at least five female partners, billed as Gaston and Andree, and toured the world, appearing in 1926 in an "All English" show at the Palace Theatre, New York.

In 1928 he teamed with Rose Wallis, who became known as Rosemary Andree. They are credited with being the first to introduce adagio dancing to variety shows in Britain. During the 1930s, they topped the bill around the country, and appeared at the Folies Bergère in Paris, and in the Royal Variety Performance in 1933, and again in 1938. They also invented and promoted personal exercise equipment. The pair appeared in the 1934 Will Hay film Those Were the Days, and the 1936 Nervo and Knox film It's in the Bag. In 1933, Walter Bird published a book of nude photographs of the pair, Beauty in the Human Form, followed by Andrée, Britain's Venus, in 1943.

After the Second World War, Gaston and Andree gave up their adagio act, and worked together as theatre show agents and producers. They put on pantomimes, and devised shows for Arthur Lucan, better known as "Old Mother Riley", between 1952 and 1954. It was at one of their shows, in Hull, that Lucan died while waiting to make his stage entry, and was immediately replaced by his understudy.

Rosemary Andree published an autobiography, My Life Story, in 1951. Jimmy Gaston died in 1966, and Rosemary Andree in 1974.
