= Those Were the Days (1934 film) =

1934 film by Thomas Bentley

- Claud Allister, Lawrence Hanray and Will Hay in the film
- Directed by: Thomas Bentley
- Written by: Jack Jordan; Frank Launder; Frederick A. Thompson
- Based on: The Magistrate by Arthur Wing Pinero
- Produced by: Walter C. Mycroft
- Starring: Will Hay; Iris Hoey; Angela Baddeley; Claud Allister; George Graves; John Mills
- Cinematography: Otto Kanturek
- Edited by: Edward B. Jarvis
- Music by: Idris Lewis
- Production company: British International Pictures
- Distributed by: Wardour Films
- Release date: 28 March 1934
- Running time: 80 minutes
- Country: United Kingdom
- Language: English

Those Were the Days (also known as The Magistrate) is a 1934 British comedy film directed by Thomas Bentley and starring Will Hay in his first major screen role, Iris Hoey, John Mills, and a number of music-hall stars as themselves. It was written by Jack Jordan, Frank Launder and Frederick A. Thompson based on Arthur Wing Pinero's 1885 farce The Magistrate and was the first of two Hay films based on Pinero's plays, the other being Dandy Dick (1935).

== Plot ==
Strait-laced magistrate Brutus Poskett is concerned that his wife may be older than he believes her to be, especially since his young stepson seems very precocious for an apparently fifteen-year-old boy.

Mrs. Poskett tries to stop an impending visit from her first husband's friend, who knows her true age, by confronting him at a local music hall. However, unbeknown to her, Poskett has also been persuaded to go to the music hall with his "adolescent" stepson and, in an ensuing melée Poskett's wife and her sister are arrested.

The following day, Poskett sentences both to seven days imprisonment, failing to recognise them as they are heavily veiled.

== Cast ==
- Will Hay as Magistrate Brutus Poskett
- Iris Hoey as Agatha Poskett
- Angela Baddeley as Charlotte
- Claud Allister as Capt. Horace Vale
- George Graves as Col. Alexander Lukyn
- John Mills as Bobby
- Jane Carr as Minnie Taylor
- Marguerite Allan as Eve Douglas
- H. F. Maltby as Mr. Bullamy
- Laurence Hanray as Wormington
- Syd Crossley as Wyke
- Wally Patch as Insp. Briggs
- Jimmy Godden as Pat Maloney
- Lily Morris as herself
- Harry Bedford as himself
- Gaston & Andree as themselves
- Sam Curtis as himself
- Frank Boston & Betty as themselves
- G. H. Elliott as himself

== Production ==
The film was produced and released by British International Pictures and was shot at the company's Elstree Studios. The film's sets were designed by the art director Duncan Sutherland.

== Reception ==
Kine Weekly wrote: "This farcical comedy is set in the most convincing and fascinating atmosphere, which recalls tender memories of the days when music-halls were music-halls. The individual turns are cleverly used to punctuate the story development, and such is the sense of balance reposed in the direction that the novelty values are given sparkling recognition without disturbing the continuity. The complexities of the plot are productive of a swift succession of riotous situations, all of which gain their hilarious fun at the expense of the conventions of the period, while the songs fit the mood and are delightfuly reminiscent."

Picturegoer wrote: "The acting is uniformly good. Will Hay, music hall and wireless comedian, plays the part of Mr. Posket splendidly. It would be rash to say that he is as good on the screen as he is on the stage merely on this one performance, but we look forward to his next picture with more than ordinary interest."

The Daily Film Renter wrote: "The director has wisely allowed the fun to take its own course, with the result that here is an indubitable box-office clean-up of sheer entertainment for all tastes, from nine to ninety."
