= Senator Bedford =

Senator Bedford may refer to:

- Gunning Bedford Jr. (1747–1812), Delaware State Senate
- Gunning Bedford Sr. (1742–1797), Delaware State Senate
- Mervin Bedford (1902–1960), Nebraska State Senate
- Olivia Cajero Bedford, Arizona State Senate
- Roger Bedford Jr. (born 1956), Alabama State Senate
