= Celia Frances Bedford =

British painter (1904–1959)

- Born: 11 February 1904; Kensington, London
- Died: 23 February 1959 (aged 55)
- Known for: Portrait painting

Celia Frances Bedford (11 February 1904 – 23 February 1959) was a British artist, notable for her portrait and figure paintings plus her work as a lithographer.

== Biography ==
Bedford was born in Kensington in west London into an artistic family, her father being the illustrator Francis Donkin Bedford. She studied at the Chelsea School of Art during 1931 and 1932. As well as individual portraits, Bedford often depicted groups of people relaxing in cafes and restaurants. She specialised in lithography and was an artist member of the Senefelder Club. Bedford had solo exhibitions at the Twenty-One Gallery and the Leicester Galleries in London. She exhibited on a regular basis at the Royal Academy, the Royal Society of British Artists, the Society of Women Artists. She was also a member of the Women's International Art Club and in 1955 was elected a member of the New English Art Club.

Works by Bedford are held by Birmingham Museum and Art Gallery, the Atkinson Art Gallery and Library in Southport and Leamington Spa Art Gallery. The Victoria & Albert Museum also has examples. In 1960 a memorial exhibition for Bedford was held at Walker's Galleries in London.
