= Walter Bedford =

English cricketer

Walter Bedford (24 February 1879 – 28 July 1939) was an English first-class cricketer, who played two matches for Yorkshire County Cricket Club in May 1903. He was a right-handed batsman who scored 38 runs for just one dismissal, and took two wickets at 58.5 with his right arm fast medium bowling.

Born in Royston, near Barnsley, Yorkshire, Bedford made his debut against Worcestershire in a drawn match at New Road, Worcester, batting number 11 and failing to take a wicket in his 26 overs. He found more success in his last match against Cambridge University, bowling Fry for 12 and Marsh for 15 in Cambridge's first innings, but his services were not called upon again after Yorkshire completed a five wicket win.

He played in at least 14 matches for Yorkshire's Second XI between 1901 and 1903.

He died, aged 60, in July 1939 in Balby, Doncaster.
