= Admiral Bedford =

Admiral Bedford may refer to:

- Arthur Bedford (1881–1949), British Royal Navy vice admiral
- Frederick Bedford (1838–1913), British Royal Navy admiral
- William Bedford (Royal Navy officer) (c. 1764–1827), British Royal Navy vice admiral
