= Henry Bedford (cricketer) =

English cricketer

Personal information
- Born: 1854; Canterbury, Kent, England
- Died: Unknown
- Bowling: Leg break

Domestic team information
- Years: Team
- 1882: Hampshire

Career statistics
Competition	First-class
Matches	1
Runs scored	3
Batting average	3.00
100s/50s	0/0
Top score	3
Balls bowled	16
Wickets	1
Bowling average	5.00
5 wickets in innings	0
10 wickets in match	0
Best bowling	1/5
Catches/stumpings	0/–
- Source: Cricinfo, 24 June 2024

Henry Bedford (1854 — date of death unknown) was an English first-class cricketer.

Bedford was born in 1854 in Canterbury. He made a single appearance in first-class cricket for Hampshire against Somerset at Southampton in 1882. Batting once in the match, he was dismissed in Hampshire's first innings for 3 runs from the lower order by Francis Reed, while with his leg break bowling he took the wicket of Arnold Fothergill.
