= Dave Bedford (footballer) =

Australian rules footballer

Personal information
- Full name: David Athelstan Bedford
- Born: 29 August 1926; Camberwell, Victoria
- Died: 25 April 2017 (aged 90)
- Original team: Melbourne Grammar
- Position: Defence

Playing career^{1}
Years	Club	Games (Goals)
1950	Melbourne	4 (0)
- ^{1} Playing statistics correct to the end of 1950.

David Athelstan Bedford (29 August 1926 – 25 April 2017) was an Australian rules footballer who played with Melbourne in the Victorian Football League (VFL).
