= Harry Bedford (cricketer) =

English cricketer

Harry Bedford (17 July 1907 – 5 July 1968) was an English first-class cricketer, who played five games for Yorkshire in 1928.

Born in Morley, Yorkshire, England, he was, unusually for a Yorkshire born cricketer, a right arm leg break and googly bowler, who took a total of eight wickets at 22.37. His career best of 6 for 91 against Derbyshire County Cricket Club at Dewsbury, helped spin Yorkshire to a win by an innings and 22 runs. Wilfred Rhodes, who had destroyed the Derbyshire batting in the first innings, failed to take a wicket as the 21-year-old Bedford bowled 32 overs with six maidens for his 6 for 91. He scored 57 runs at 14.25, with a top score of 24 against Essex.

He played at least 27 times for Yorkshire Second XI from 1926 to 1933, and was unlucky not to feature again in the first team.

Bedford died aged 60, in July 1968 in Croydon, Surrey.
