= Harry Bedford (music hall) =

English music hall entertainer (1873–1939)

Harry Bedford (1873 – 17 October 1939) was a British music hall comedian and singer.

Born in Pimlico, London, he made his first onstage appearance at the age of seven. He was an apprentice in a boat-building business before becoming a professional entertainer in 1888, making his first appearances in pantomimes and minstrel shows. By 1895 he had become a leading music hall entertainer, appearing at the Middlesex Music Hall in London and developing an act that was considered somewhat risqué for the time. Described as a "low comedian", his popular songs (written by others) included "A Little Bit Off the Top", "The Cock of the North", and "When I Get Some Money".

Part of his act can be seen in the 1934 Will Hay film Those Were the Days.

He died in London in 1939.
