= Henry Edward Bedford =

American painter and sculptor

Henry Edward Bedford (1860–1932) was an American painter and sculptor who designed the four-faced clock on top of the information booth located in Grand Central Terminal in New York City. As a painter, Henry E. Bedford was best known for his studies of the Maine coast. The American Art Annual reported Bedford's sudden demise on October 29, 1932, on the train ride from Maine to Brooklyn. The death notice stated that "… he was especially fond of reproducing the scenery of Maine, and his landscapes and marines won him much praise from critics…" Henry E. Bedford is listed in key art reference publications such as Who Was Who in American Art and was a member of the Salmagundi Club. He also can be found online on Askart.com and Artprice.com.

The Bedford family had a long history in the clock and watch industry. Alfred Bedford, Henry's father, was a "member of the original Tiffany and Company and the London representative of the Waltham Watch Company." Henry E. Bedford, along with his uncle, Edward T. Bedford, and his brother, Alfred C. Bedford, were executives of the Self Winding Clock Company. Henry E. Bedford reportedly retired from the company in the mid-1920s. His obituary in the American Art Annual stated that Henry Bedford designed "several other large clocks" in addition to the famous one in Grand Central Terminal. His death announcement in The New York Times, notes "he designed the clock in the Grand Central Station and several other large clocks here [New Haven, CT] and in other cities."
