= InterContinental New York Barclay Hotel =

Hotel in Manhattan, New York

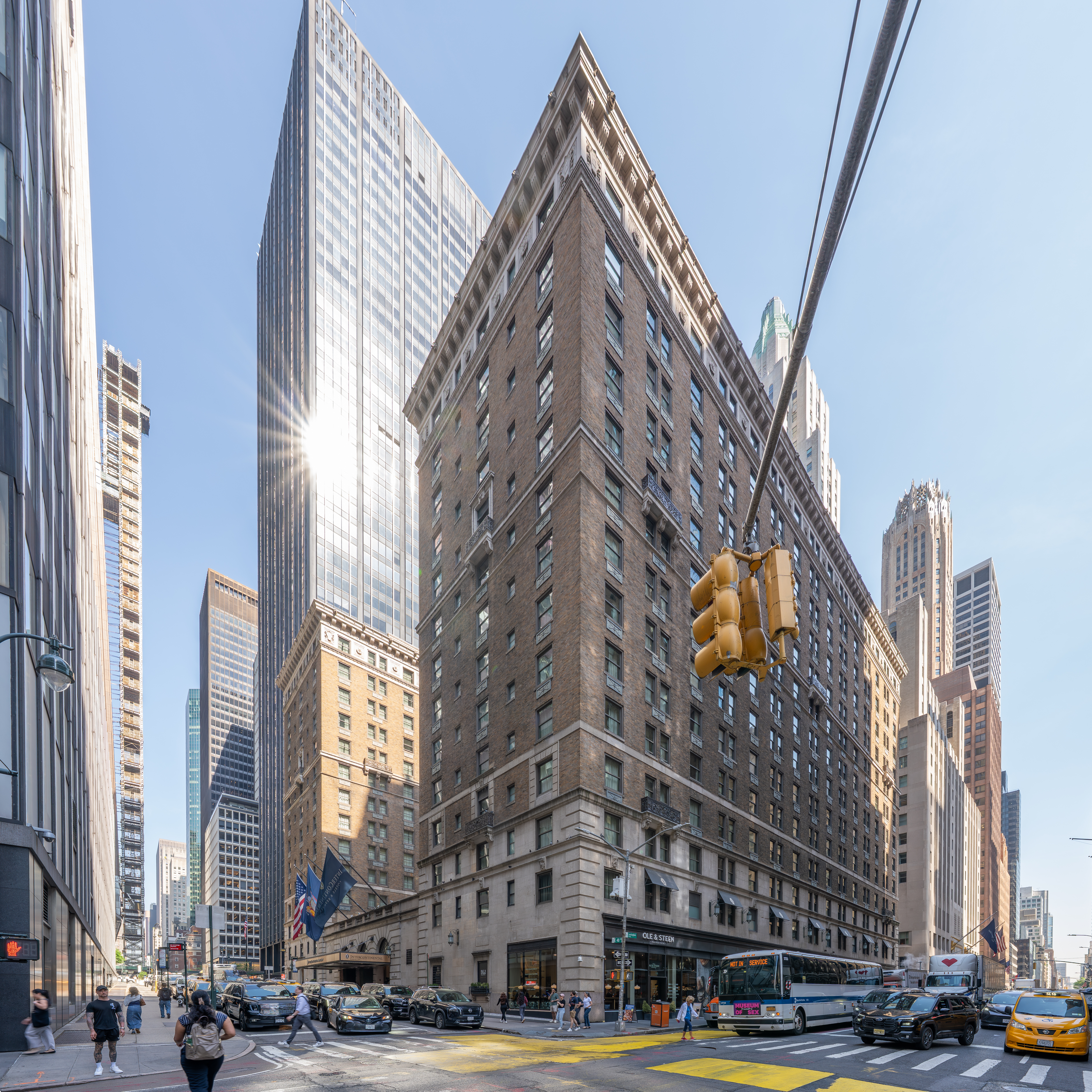
- Front entrance on 48th Street
- Interactive map of the InterContinental New York Barclay Hotel area

General information
- Location: 111 East 48th Street, Manhattan, New York
- Coordinates: 40°45′21″N 73°58′24″W
- Opening: 1926

Technical details
- Floor count: 14

Design and construction
- Architect: Cross and Cross

Other information
- Number of rooms: 702
- Number of suites: 32

Website
- intercontinentalnybarclay.com

The InterContinental New York Barclay Hotel is a hotel at 111 East 48th Street, on Lexington Avenue between 48th and 49th Streets, in the Midtown Manhattan neighborhood of New York City. The 14-story hotel, operated by IHG Hotels & Resorts, was designed by Cross and Cross in the Colonial style and contains 702 rooms. The Barclay was one of several large hotels developed around Grand Central Terminal as part of Terminal City.

The hotel building contains a facade of brick and limestone, with entrances from all three of the surrounding streets. It is arranged in the shape of the letter "H", with light courts facing north and south. The ground level contains a lobby, storefronts, and restaurant spaces, while the second story contains two ballrooms and other event spaces. Unlike traditional hotels of its time, the Barclay was designed as an apartment hotel and originally lacked large convention spaces or ballrooms. When the hotel opened, it had 842 guestrooms, in addition to bedrooms for maids and servants, but this has been reduced over the years. The top story initially contained a 17-room suite for New York Central Railroad director Harold Stirling Vanderbilt.

The Barclay Hotel opened on November 4, 1926, and was operated by Realty Hotels, a subsidiary of the New York Central Railroad, for more than six decades. The New York Central was superseded in 1968 by Penn Central, which tried to sell the hotel multiple times after going bankrupt in the 1970s. Loews Hotels purchased the hotel in June 1978 and resold it to InterContinental Hotels, which renamed the Barclay as the Inter-Continental New York in 1982 after an extensive renovation. The hotel was renovated again in 1995; it was rebranded the InterContinental, The Barclay New York in 2001 and as the InterContinental New York Barclay in 2009. Constellation Hotel Holdings bought a majority stake in the hotel in 2013, and the hotel underwent another renovation from 2014 to 2016.

== Site ==
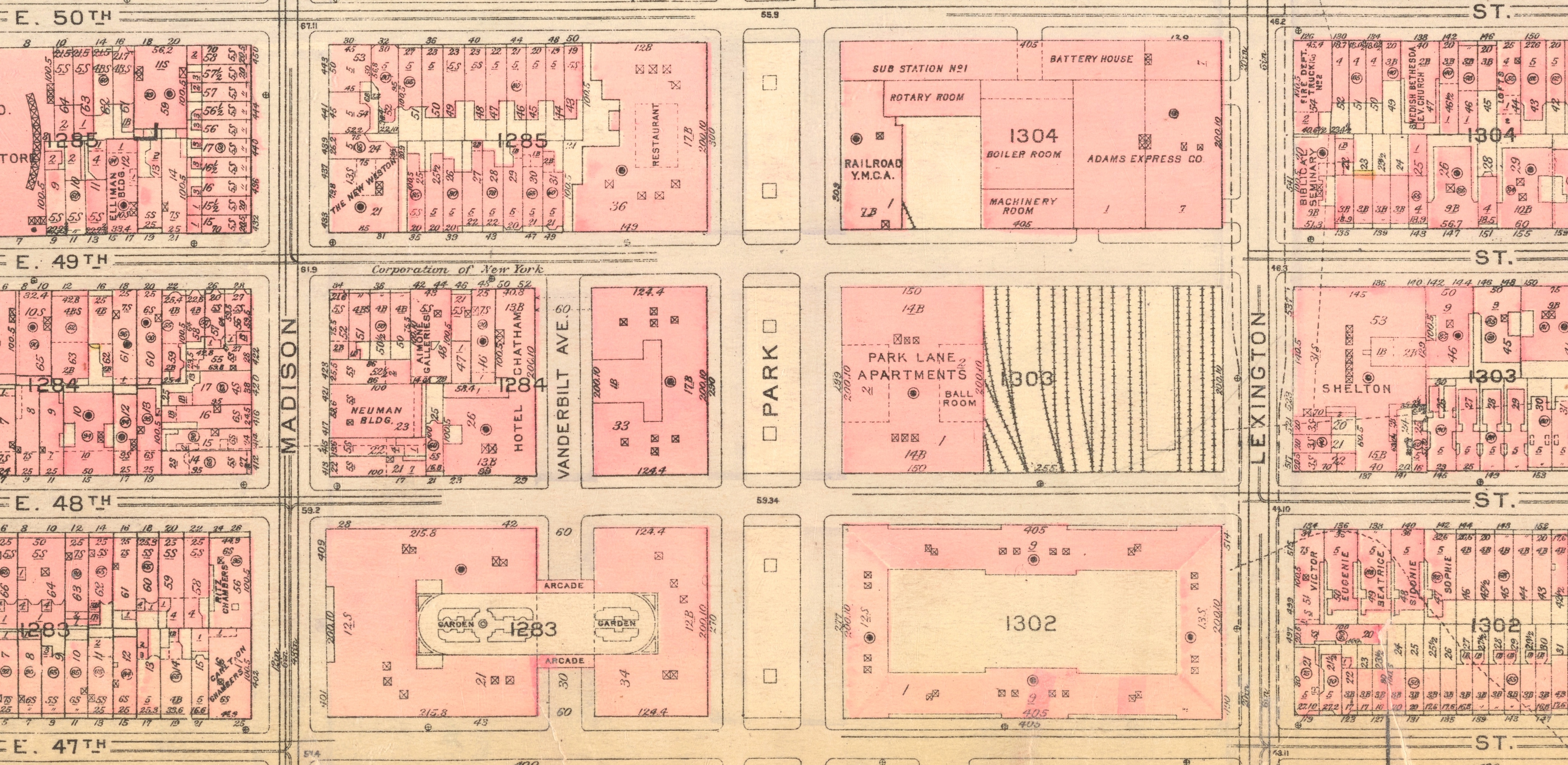
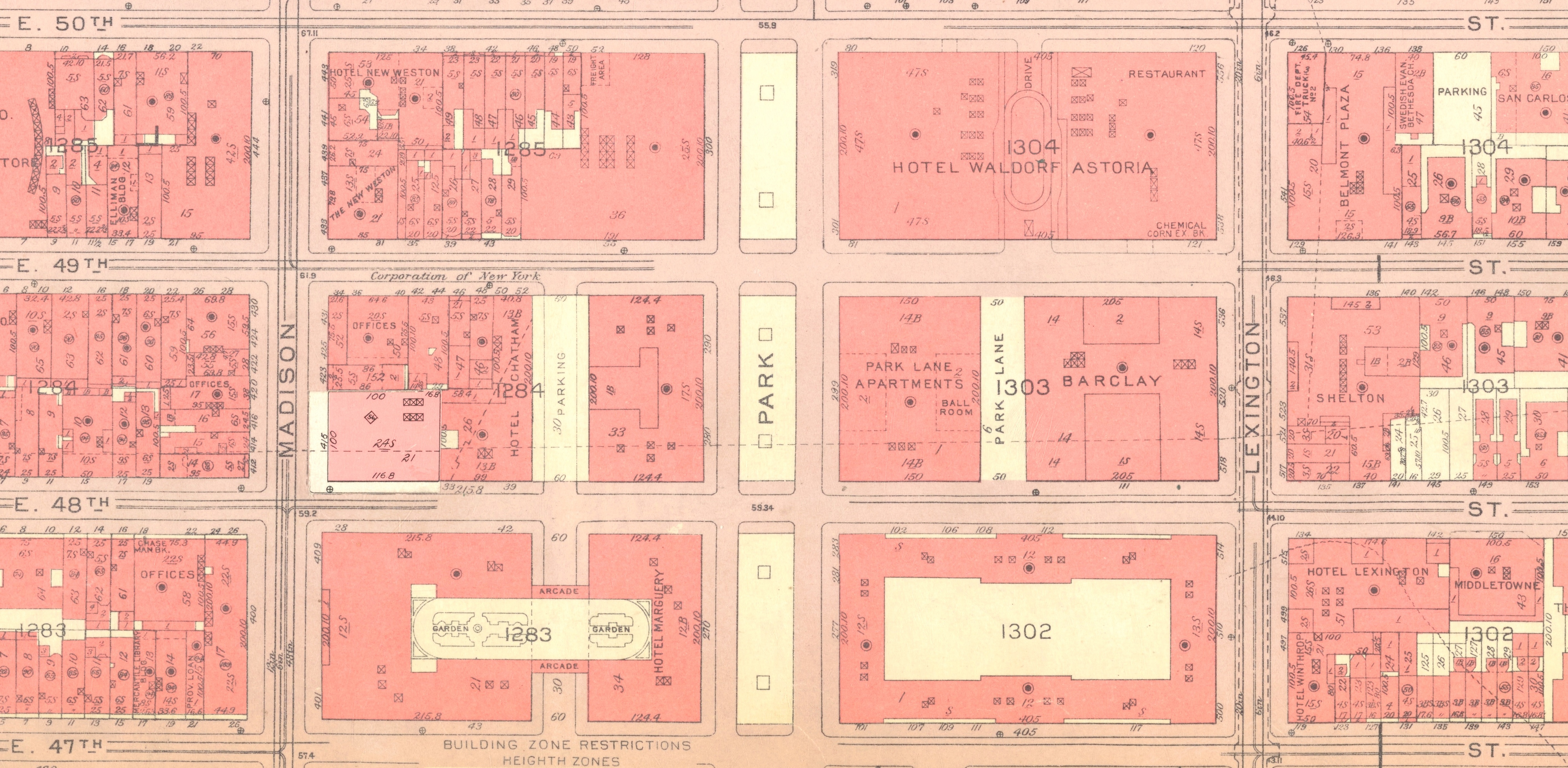
Maps from the 1920s (top) and the 1950s showing the site of The Barclay, center right

The InterContinental Barclay Hotel is at 111 East 48th Street, on the western side of Lexington Avenue between 48th and 49th Streets, in the Midtown Manhattan neighborhood of New York City. It sits on the eastern portion of a city block bounded by Park Avenue to the west, 48th Street to the south, Lexington Avenue to the east, and 49th Street to the north. The Barclay occupies a rectangular land lot with an area of 41,170 ft^{2} (3,825 m^{2}). The site has a frontage of 200 ft (61 m) on Lexington Avenue and 205 ft (62 m) on either side street. When the Barclay was built in the 1920s, it adjoined Park Lane, a private driveway, to the west.

The Barclay shares the block with 299 Park Avenue to the west. Along Park Avenue, the buildings at 245 Park Avenue and 277 Park Avenue are directly to the south, while the Waldorf Astoria New York hotel is directly to the north. On Lexington Avenue, the Barclay adjoins the Lexington Hotel NYC to the southeast and the Hotel Shelton to the east. The Barclay was part of "Hotel Row", a collection of hotels developed along Lexington Avenue in the early 20th century. The hotel's address at 111 East 48th Street was intended to relate to the apartment hotels that occupied the adjacent section of Park Avenue during the early 20th century, such as the Park Lane Hotel and Hotel Ambassador.

== Architecture ==
The Barclay Hotel was designed by Cross & Cross. The hotel is 157 feet (48 m) high with 14 stories. To distinguish the hotel from others in the area, Cross and Cross designed the Barclay in the Colonial style. The designer R. T. Haines Halsey oversaw the interior design along with Mrs. Charles Sabin, who headed the hotel's interior advisory committee. Halsey and Sabin both contributed some of their own artwork to the hotel's design collection.

=== Form and facade ===
The hotel building is arranged in the shape of the letter "H", with light courts facing north and south, allowing the ground-story spaces to be illuminated by skylights. The lower stories of the facade are clad in limestone, with carvings of sea creatures and shells at the base. The main entrance on 48th Street was composed of a loggia with three arches, a set of bronze doors, and a marble frame. There were secondary entrances on Lexington Avenue and 49th Street, which led to the guestroom elevators. The rest of the hotel's facade was designed in the Italian Renaissance style and was made of light-colored brick, interspersed with architectural terracotta trim. The facade is topped by a cornice with heavy denticulation.

=== Public rooms ===
==== Ground floor ====
As designed, the lobby and lounge was a square space accessed directly from the 48th Street entrance. The lobby floor was made of Bardiglio marble with a black-and-gold border, while the wainscoting was made of verde antique marble. The lobby also contains a carved plaster frieze on the walls. Two marble columns in the lobby supported a ceiling with a Tiffany glass skylight, directly below the southern light court. The skylight was made of amber glass and contained ironwork with arrow and star motifs. The lobby was further decorated with American colonial-style symbols against a blue background. A bird cage was installed at the center of the lobby in 1945. Following the 1980s renovation, the Barclay's lobby was decorated with wood paneling and contained chandeliers suspended from a lofty ceiling. The space also contained couches and a replica bird cage at its center. The cage was ultimately removed altogether in 1995, and a green-marble entrance vestibule near the main entrance was constructed at that time. When the hotel was renovated in 2016, a grand staircase of Carrara marble was built within the lobby.

On the eastern portion of the ground level were six storefronts facing Lexington Avenue. A corridor led west from Lexington Avenue to an elevator hall, separating the two storefronts to the north from the four storefronts to the south. Just west of the storefronts, another corridor led from 49th Street to the main lobby, providing access both to the two northernmost storefronts and the elevator lobby. The four southern storefronts could also be accessed from the lobby. There were six passenger elevators, three on either side of the elevator lobby. In addition, there were two freight elevators, which traveled to service lobbies on each guestroom story. A set of six dumbwaiters connected with the ground-level kitchen and with service pantries on each guestroom story.

The ground level had two dining rooms. The main dining room was placed at the southwestern corner of the ground level; it could be accessed from a separate vestibule from 48th Street. This dining room could fit 300 people and was designed in a manner reminiscent of George Washington's Mount Vernon estate. It contained oak paneling with replicas of pieces by Duncan Phyfe. A lounge called the Barclay Terrace extended off the western end of the lobby; it was originally used for serving tea. In addition, there was a kitchen at the northwestern corner. As part of a 1995 renovation, a bar was installed behind the Barclay Terrace. A small private dining room, fitting 24 people, was constructed next to the bar. During 2016, a bar called the Gin Parlour was created within the lobby, as well as the Club InterContinental lounge.

==== Second and third floors ====
Unlike traditional hotels of its time, the Barclay was designed as an apartment hotel and originally lacked large convention spaces or ballrooms. The second floor contained three private dining rooms, including two dining suites. One of the dining suites evoked the Baltimore Room in the Met Fifth Avenue's American wing and could be reached by a private entrance. There was also a children's dining room and various apartments for tenants' servants. In the 1980s, a wine cellar was constructed on the second floor, occupying a former telephone room on that level; the cellar could not be placed below ground level due to the presence of Grand Central Terminal's underground railroad tracks. During a 2016 renovation, two ballrooms were built within the light courts on the second story, which formerly contained technical equipment. The Grand Ballroom was placed above the lobby and covered 4,954 ft^{2} (460.2 m^{2}), while the Empire Ballroom covered 3,000 ft^{2} (280 m^{2}). Both of these spaces contain architectural details such as chandeliers suspended from 17 ft-high (5.2 m) coffered ceilings.

The third story was a clubhouse for the Cornell Club of New York from 1939 to 1961, with a bar, library, dining room, and women's lounge. The Cornell Club space, covering 10,000 ft^{2} (930 m^{2}), had a private entrance and an elevator. Public rooms were added to the third story in the 1980s, with separate rooms for business meetings and social events. By 2016, the hotel had 15,000 ft^{2} (1,400 m^{2}) of event space, including nine meeting rooms.

=== Guestrooms ===
When the hotel opened, it had 842 guestrooms, in addition to bedrooms for maids and servants; a 1932 guide cited the hotel as having 850 rooms. Each story had 69 rooms, and guests could rent either furnished or unfurnished rooms. The corridors originally contained wallpaper, decorated with an old print that depicted New York City in 1720. The guestrooms themselves contained up to three bedrooms, which could be rearranged as needed. All bedrooms had their own bathrooms, and each guestroom had a small pantry and a small private foyer. The bathrooms, foyers, and in-room pantries were placed between the guestrooms and the corridors. Many rooms on the four upper stories contained fireplaces. Each story also had its own service pantry shared by all occupants of that story, with kitchen appliances such as cabinets, refrigerators, and sinks.

Following a renovation in the late 1990s, the hotel had 680 rooms, including 80 suites. The guestrooms included small standard suites; mid-sized deluxe suites; and large junior and one-bedroom suites. The guestrooms were decorated in two color schemes and contained hardwood floors, beamed ceilings, and crown moldings; the larger suites contained fireplaces and sitting areas. Following a renovation in 2016, the hotel contained 704 units. The Barclay was reduced to 26 suites because some of the other suites had been subdivided; the largest suites were the Presidential Suite, as well as the Penthouse Sky Suite, the latter of which included an outdoor terrace spanning 1,500 ft^{2} (140 m^{2}). During the 2016 renovation, the hotel's operators added soundproofing between the different guestrooms, and they constructed larger bathrooms with walk-in showers in each guestroom. The rooms were also designed with motifs from the original hotel; these details even extended to the door handle plates, which contained eagle medallions.

New York Central Railroad director Harold Stirling Vanderbilt originally had a 17-room suite on the top floor. The suite was decorated in the French Renaissance style and contained imported French oak paneling in several rooms including the drawing room, dining room, library, and several bedrooms. Vanderbilt's suite also included an onyx-and-marble stairway, as well as a gymnasium and squash court on the roof. By 1942, Vanderbilt's suite had been converted to a clubhouse.

== History ==
In the 19th century, New York Central Railroad lines north of Grand Central Depot in Midtown Manhattan were served exclusively by steam locomotives, and the rising traffic soon caused accumulations of smoke and soot in the Park Avenue Tunnel, the only approach to the depot. After a fatal crash in 1902, the New York state legislature passed a law to ban all steam trains in Manhattan by 1908. The New York Central's vice president William J. Wilgus proposed electrifying the line and building a new electric-train terminal underground, a plan that was implemented almost in its entirety. The old Grand Central Depot was torn down in phases and replaced by the current Grand Central Terminal. Construction on Grand Central Terminal started in 1903, and the new terminal was opened on February 2, 1913. Passenger traffic on the commuter lines into Grand Central more than doubled in the years following the terminal's completion.

The terminal spurred development in the surrounding area, particularly in Terminal City, a commercial and office district created above where the tracks were covered. Terminal City soon became Manhattan's most desirable commercial and office district. A 1920 New York Times article said, "With its hotels, office buildings, apartments and underground Streets it not only is a wonderful railroad terminal, but also a great civic centre." The Barclay was one of several hotels developed in Terminal City, along with other hostelries such as the Commodore, the Roosevelt, and the Biltmore.

=== Realty Hotels operation ===
==== Development and early years ====
By the mid-1920s, the parcel on the west side of Lexington Avenue between 48th and 49th Streets was one of the last remaining vacant parcels in Terminal City. The New York State Realty and Terminal Company, a division of the New York Central Railroad, leased this parcel in January 1925 to a syndicate headed by architect Eliot Cross and businessman William Seward Webb Jr. The syndicate, known as the Barclay Park Corporation, planned to construct a 600-unit apartment house above the railroad tracks there, with one to three rooms per unit. By that June, Cross and Cross had drawn up plans for a 14-story hotel on the site, to be known as the Barclay, and had hired Todd Richardson Todd as the general contractor. The firm filed plans for the hotel the next month. The Vanderbilt family provided funding for the hotel's construction.

The hotel was originally scheduled to open on October 21, 1926, although some residents began moving into their apartments at the beginning of that month. The opening date was ultimately postponed to November 4, when the developers hosted a dance at the hotel. Fred Swoboda was the Barclay's first maître d'hôtel. The Barclay gained a reputation for being elegant, glamorous, and popular in social circles after its opening. The hotel attracted guests such as actor Marlon Brando, and it also hosted events such as Miss America competitions. In May 1927, the Barclay Park Corporation was authorized to issue $1.2 million in convertible first mortgage bonds, $1.2 million in 7 percent notes, and two tranches of common stock totaling 72,000 shares.

During the 1930s, the hotel hosted such events as art competitions and meetings of civic group Lexington Avenue Association. The Barclay started to receive power from hydraulic plants in Grand Central Terminal's basement in 1931, and the hotel began serving alcoholic beverages for the first time in late 1933, after a Prohibition-era ban had been repealed. The Barclay Park Corporation sought to reorganize in 1935 after suffering net losses of about $600,000 during each of the preceding two years. By the late 1930s, the hotel contained clubs for the alumni of several colleges, including Cornell University, Wellesley College, and Bryn Mawr College. At the time, George V. Lindholm was the Barclay's general manager. At some point in the mid-20th century, Frank A. Ready also served as the Barclay's resident manager.

==== 1940s to 1960s ====
As apartment hotels declined in popularity, the Barclay gradually became a regular hotel for short-term guests. William H. Rorke was appointed as the hotel's general manager in 1943, after Lindholm was promoted as a vice president of Realty Hotels. In 1945, the Barclay became the first hotel in the world to install a bird cage in its lobby; visitors could bring their own birds. The bird cage became a popular meeting place over the years. The Barclay largely remained a residential hotel, and half of its guests lived there permanently in 1946. The Barclay's restaurant temporarily closed that year due to a foodworkers' strike. The hotel continued to host events during the 1940s and early 1950s, such as awards ceremonies for the New York Newspaper Woman's Club, a meeting of the National Federation of Business and Professional Women, and a reception hosted by US senator Robert A. Taft.

Harry M. Anholt took over as Realty Hotels' president in 1954. Despite the New York Central's financial troubles during this time, Realty Hotels intended to retain the Barclay and its other hotels. During the 1950s, the Barclay was renovated as part of a $5 million project spanning three hotels. The dining room was refurbished with red carpets and decor. Following this renovation, the dining room became an English-style grill room called the King's Inn. Although the hotel was still profitable, the New York Central as a whole had begun to lose money by the late 1950s.

Virginia Lee Baker was appointed as the Barclay's manager in 1964. The Barclay remained a popular hostelry; in 1963, the hotel had accommodated guests from all except one US state. The hotel's clientele that year also included travelers from 45 countries, largely European and South American nations. During the 1960s, Realty Hotels replaced about half of the manually operated elevators at the Barclay, Biltmore, Commodore, and Roosevelt, and it renovated these hotels as part of a $22 million modernization program. In addition, when the chain's Park Lane Hotel was demolished in the early 1960s, the Park Lane's period-furniture collection was relocated to the Barclay. Realty Hotels' president said the renovations had helped attract new and returning customers to the hotels.

=== 1970s sales ===
The New York Central had experienced financial decline during the 1960s, merging with the Pennsylvania Railroad in 1968 to form the Penn Central Railroad. Penn Central continued to face financial issues and failed to make mortgage payments. After Penn Central went bankrupt in 1970, the company sought to sell its properties, including the land below the Barclay Hotel. The buildings were placed for sale at an auction in October 1971, and Kalikow Realty made a low bid of $12.56 million for the hotel. Penn Central received two bids for the hotel, one of which was rejected.

Penn Central's trustees announced plans in August 1972 to sell the 802-room Barclay to Western International Hotels, a subsidiary of United Air Lines, for $21.8 million, subject to approval from a federal district court. The same year, the Barclay, Biltmore, Commodore, and Roosevelt began showing in-room movies. The court rejected the proposed sale to Western International in early 1973 because of discrepancies in the hotel's appraised value, as well as the fact that Helmsley-Spear had made a $23 million offer for the Barclay. The proceedings were delayed for several years. Penn Central, which had placed all of Realty Hotels' properties for sale, subsequently withdrew its offer to sell the hotels. Instead, Penn Central spent $4.5 million renovating the Biltmore, Barclay, and Roosevelt hotels in 1976.

In April 1978, Penn Central requested permission from a federal district court to sell the Biltmore, Barclay, and Roosevelt hotels for $45 million to Loews Hotels. A consortium of Middle Eastern investors subsequently offered to buy the hotels for $50 million. Loews raised its offer for the three hotels to $55 million, and a federal judge approved the sale at the beginning of June 1978. Carter B. Horsley wrote that Loews's purchase of the three hotels "may save their future". At the time, the hotel had 790 rooms. Initially, Loews planned to operate the Barclay and sell the other two hotels. Instead, Loews resold the Barclay to InterContinental Hotels, a subsidiary of Pan Am, in July 1978. InterContinental Hotels planned to renovate the hotel at a cost of $18 million. The Barclay, which was the first hotel operated by Pan Am in New York City, was to become the flagship of the InterContinental chain.

=== InterContinental ownership ===
==== 1980s ====
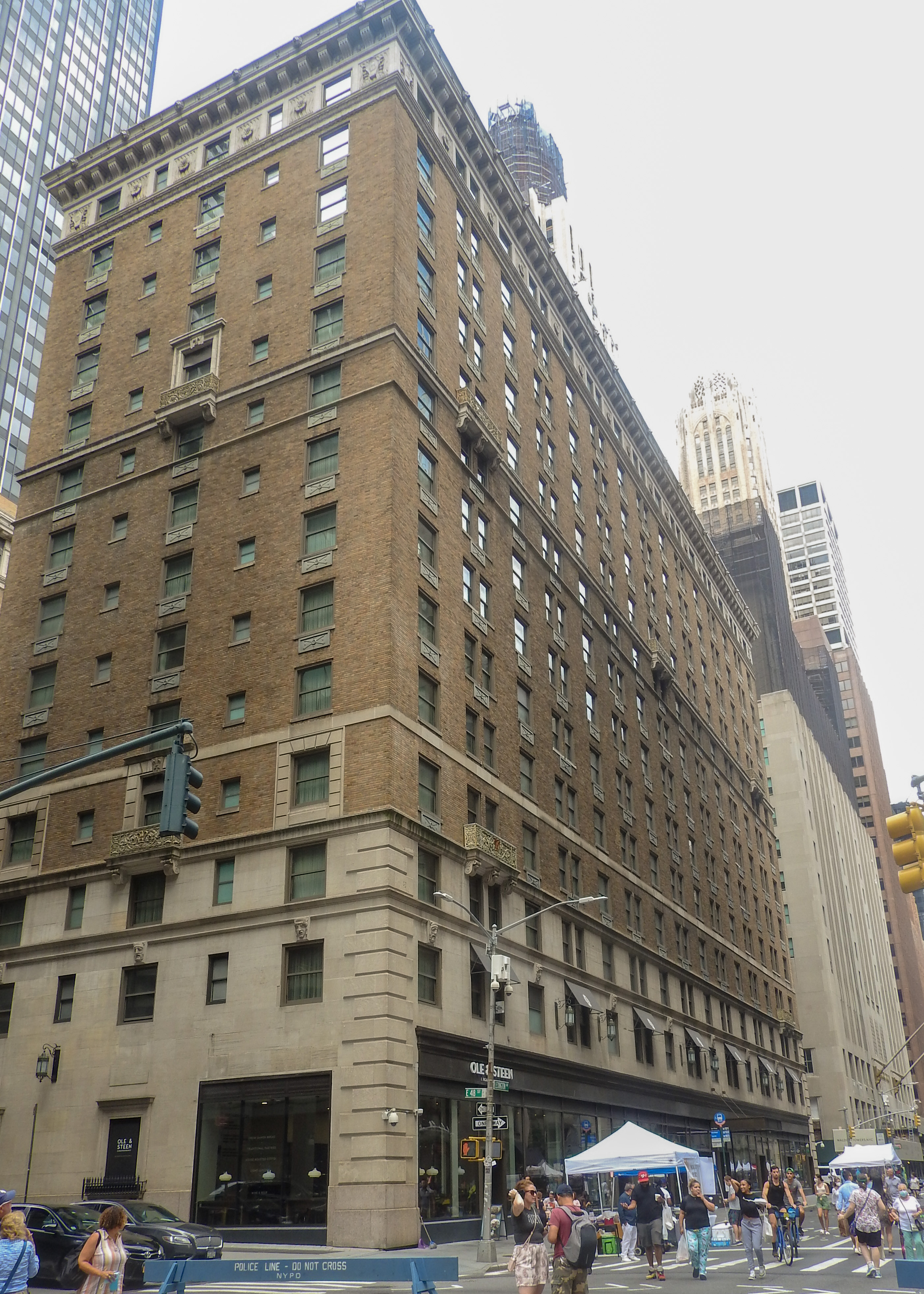
Seen from Lexington Avenue

InterContinental received a $37 million loan from the Connecticut General Life Insurance Company in late 1979, and the chain began refurbishing the hotel. The hotel remained open during the renovation, though about a third of the rooms were undergoing renovations at any given time in 1981. The renovation was complicated by the fact that workers could not find some of the original construction plans. Grand Metropolitan subsequently purchased the InterContinental chain in 1981 and began operating the Barclay. Advertising agencies Doyle Dane Bernbach and Smith/Greenland created a television advertisement for the newly renovated hotel. The promotion, starring English actor John Gielgud in his first television advertisement, was the first time that a hotel in the InterContinental chain used TV advertising. Other advertisements featured the bird cage in the lobby, as well as the new public rooms on the third floor, which included a new restaurant called La Recolte.

After the $32 million renovation was completed, the hotel was renamed the Inter-Continental New York in 1982. The renovation occurred in spite of increasing land values; the Baltimore Sun estimated in 1984 that the site's valuation "dictates 30- and 40-story prestige office buildings rather than hotels". The hotel's managers announced in 1986 that they would close the La Recolte restaurant permanently to make way for a reception room for the ballroom. In addition, they would renovate the Barclay restaurant "in the manner of La Recolte" for $2 million. The next year, the hotel designated an entire floor of 60 rooms as non-smoking rooms. By the late 1980s, the hotel was the most profitable in the InterContinental chain, with an occupancy rate of 78.5 percent, although its occupancy rates and room rates both lagged behind those of similarly sized hotels in New York City. The hotel's most expensive room, the presidential suite, had a nightly room rate of $5,000. Seiji Tsutsumi's Saison Group acquired the hotels in the InterContinental chain, including the former Barclay, in October 1988, amid a decline in tourism in New York City.

==== 1990s and 2000s ====
By the early 1990s, the InterContinental New York frequently hosted road shows. Around the same time, the United States Department of Justice investigated complaints that the hotel violated the Americans with Disabilities Act of 1990. As a result, in 1993, Saison Group agreed to spend $1.7 million over the next five years to make the hotel more accessible. The changes included adding ramps, widening doorways, installing braille signage, converting 21 rooms to wheelchair-accessible rooms, and installing new decorations that complemented the hotel's original design. The installation of a ramp at the front entrance was complicated by the presence of the railroad tracks underneath the building. The lobby, public rooms, and guestrooms were restored in 1995 as part of a $20 million project. As part of the lobby renovation, architect Kenneth Hurd added a bar and a private dining room behind the Barclay Terrace restaurant, and he built a new wheelchair-accessible vestibule and reception desk in the lobby. The bird cage in the lobby was removed at this time. The Barclay Bar & Grill opened within the hotel's lobby in 1997.

Architecture firm Forrest Perkins renovated the guestrooms in the late 1990s. During the renovation, hotel staff began issuing complimentary vouchers to dissatisfied guests; this program continued after the renovation was completed. Upon the hotel's 75th anniversary in 2001, it rebranded the InterContinental, The Barclay New York. Due to security concerns following the September 11 attacks in 2001, the hotel directed all guests to use a single entrance, where staff conducted security checks. By the mid-2000s, about 70 percent of the hotel's guests were Americans; business travelers frequented the Barclay during weekdays, while tourists commonly stayed there during the weekend. The Barclay's business declined after the 2008 financial crisis. In 2009, the hotel became the InterContinental New York Barclay.

=== Constellation ownership ===
InterContinental Hotels Group began marketing the Barclay in 2011. IHG planned to sell its stake in the Barclay in early 2012 to Qatari businessman Ghanim Bin Saad Al Saad for $300 million. Later that year, the chain announced that it might keep a minority stake in the Barclay. IHG had broken off negotiations with Al Saad by November 2012, and the chain solicited new bids for the hotel. After failing to find a buyer for the hotel, IHG withdrew its offer to sell the Barclay in 2013 and began renovating the property. In December 2013, IHG agreed to sell an 80 percent stake in the Barclay to Constellation Barclay Holding U.S. LLC, a subsidiary of Qatari chain Constellation Hotel Holdings for $240 million. The sale was finalized in April 2014. At the time, the hotel was valued at $300 million. Under the terms of the sale, IHG would continue to operate the hotel for the next 30 years, with options for two 10-year extensions.

Constellation planned to conduct a $175 million renovation of the hotel. Constellation planned to fund four-fifths of the renovation cost, while IHG would provide the remaining funding. To fund the acquisition and the renovation, Deutsche Bank gave Constellation a loan of $240 million in early 2014, including $185 million in debt and $55 million for the renovation. The hotel closed for renovations in September 2014. Architecture firm Stonehill + Taylor, interior designer HOK, and consultant IHG Design Studio designed the renovation, while Shawmut Construction was the general contractor. The project involved redesigning the hotel's public spaces and restoring all of the guestrooms. The hotel reopened in May 2016. The project ultimately cost $180 million and took 20 months.

== Notable tenants ==
When the Barclay opened, its guests included Eliot Cross, one of the principals of the Cross & Cross firm, as well as H. B. Hollins, who had been one of the firm's clients. The Barclay's first residents also included businessman Walter W. Law, politician William Henry Barnum, and actor Charles Ray. During the mid-20th century, the hotel's residents included exiled Russian prince Nicholas Engalitcheff, composer Amy Beach, and producer James Kevin McGuinness. Other notable guests included Madame Nhu, wife of Vietnamese leader Ngô Đình Nhu, during the 1960s. In later years, Bette Davis, Gloria Swanson, Mary Pickford, Marlon Brando, Jimmy Durante, Debbie Reynolds, Ernest Hemingway and David O. Selznick all lived at the Barclay.

Caswell-Massey, the oldest chemist and perfumer in the United States, was one of the first tenants to lease space in the Barclay in June 1926, operating its flagship store there for decades. In addition, Doubleday subsidiary Doubleday Page Book Shop Company was among the Barclay's earliest tenants. Abraham Beame had a campaign office at the Barclay during the 1973 New York City mayoral election, and Bill Clinton used the Barclay as his New York headquarters during the Bill Clinton 1992 presidential campaign. Kofi Annan also frequented the Barclay while he was Secretary-General of the United Nations.

The Barclay also hosted several clubhouses. The New York chapter of the Delphian Society was organized at the Barclay in 1935 and met there through the 1930s. The Cornell Club of New York leased space at the hotel in 1938; the club was initially housed on the first floor, but a Cornell Club headquarters opened on the third floor in April 1939. The Wellesley College and Bryn Mawr College clubs of New York also occupied space on the 14th floor beginning in 1938, although the Wellesley club moved in 1954. The American Women's Association also relocated to Harold S. Vanderbilt's suite in the Barclay in 1942. The Cornell Club relocated to a new building three blocks away in 1961. The Manhattan Club, a gentlemen's club, announced plans to relocate to the Cornell Club's space in 1966.

== Critical reception ==
When the hotel opened, Helen Bishop of Arts & Decoration wrote that the Barclay was "an individual residence of restrained luxury in the mellow manner of the late 18th century, done on a larger scale." Bishop particularly praised the hotel's architectural style, saying: "Among New York's recent beautiful buildings of this nature, not one tells such a vivid and fascinating story of Colonial days as the Barclay." In a book published in 1932, W. Parker Chase wrote that the Barclay "caters only to the most refined, offering luxury of seclusiveness in a section of the city where New York is smartest, gayest and busiest – where there is the comforting preassurance of the prestige of one's fellow guests".

During 1981, the Mobil Travel Guide rated the Barclay as "excellent" with three stars on a five-star scale. The New York Times wrote in 1982: "But when it comes to lobbies, few in New York catch quite the elegance and stability of the lobby that adds luster to the Hotel Inter-Continental New York." Similarly, the book The Best of New York stated in 1983: "For our money there is no finer hotel in New York." Writing in 2006, a critic for the St. Louis Post-Dispatch praised the physical facilities and the doorman service but lamented the small bathrooms and the fact that the lobby's bird cage had been removed. Christopher Gray, writing for the Times in 2009, said that the hotel "is a standout in magnificent condition".

== See also ==
- List of hotels in New York City
