= New York Biltmore Hotel =

Hotel in New York City (1913–1981)

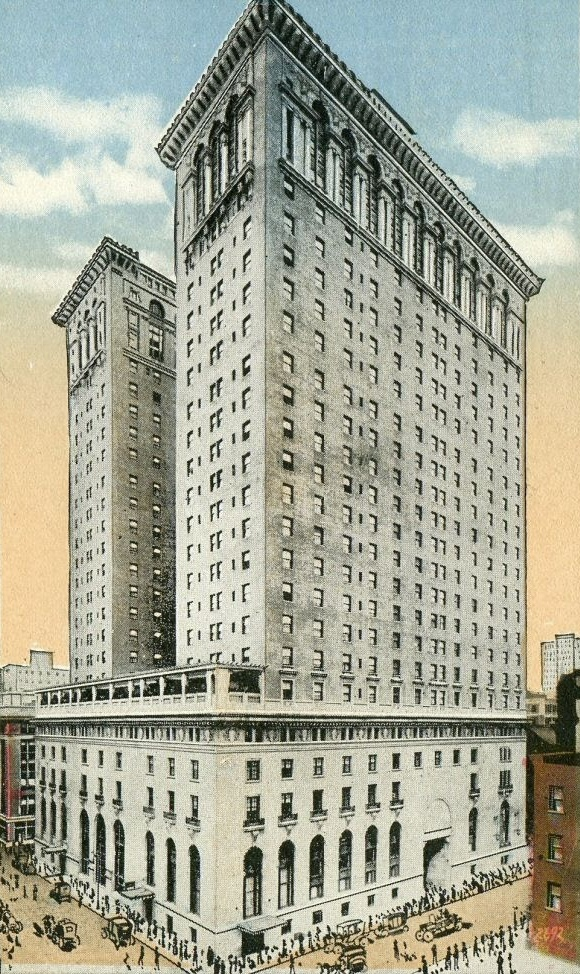
- (1917)
- Site of the hotel
- Alternative names: Biltmore Hotel
- Etymology: Biltmore Estate in North Carolina

General information
- Status: Demolished (except for frame and basement)
- Architectural style: Italian Renaissance Revival
- Location: 335 Madison Avenue, Manhattan, New York City
- Coordinates: 40°45′13″N 73°58′41″W
- Groundbreaking: March 1913
- Completed: December 1913
- Opened: December 31, 1913
- Closed: August 14, 1981
- Demolished: 1981–1983 (facade and interior)
- Cost: US$5.5 million (equivalent to $179 million in 2025)

Height
- Height: 305 feet (93 m)

Technical details
- Floor count: 23–26

Design and construction
- Architect: Warren and Wetmore
- Developer: New York State Realty and Terminal Company

Other information
- Number of rooms: 1,000

The New York Biltmore Hotel was a luxury hotel at 335 Madison Avenue in Midtown Manhattan, New York City. The hotel was developed by the New York Central Railroad and the New York, New Haven and Hartford Railroad and operated from 1913 to 1981. It was one of several large hotels developed around Grand Central Terminal as part of Terminal City. The Biltmore was designed in the Italian Renaissance Revival style by Warren and Wetmore, one of the firms involved in designing Grand Central. Although the hotel's steel frame still exists, the hotel itself was almost entirely demolished and replaced by an office building in the early 1980s.

The hotel building was variously cited as having between 23 and 26 stories. The hotel had a facade of granite, limestone, brick, and terracotta. Most of its floor plan was U-shaped, with a light court facing east toward Vanderbilt Avenue. In the basement was a reception room that led directly from Grand Central Terminal. The public dining rooms, including the Palm Court and main dining room, were at ground level. There was a roof garden above the sixth story, facing east toward Vanderbilt Avenue. There were additional ballrooms and meeting spaces on the upper stories. In total, the Biltmore had 1,000 rooms and suites; the fourth floor included a private entertainment suite called the Presidential Suite.

Following the construction of Grand Central Terminal, the New York Central started planning a hotel on the city block in the early 1910s, and it officially opened on December 31, 1913. The hotel was originally operated by Gustav Baumann, who died in October 1914. The hotel's manager, John McEntee Bowman, then operated it until his own death in 1931, affiliating the Biltmore with the Bowman-Biltmore Hotels chain. Realty Hotels Inc., a subsidiary of the New York Central, took over the hotel in 1934 and operated it for four decades. Paul Milstein acquired the hotel in 1978 and began demolishing the interiors immediately after the hotel closed on August 15, 1981. Despite protests from preservationists, Milstein gutted the Biltmore and converted it into an office building called Bank of America Plaza, which reopened in May 1984. Bank of America relocated in 2010 and the building became 335 Madison Avenue. Following another renovation in 2019, the structure became The Company Building, which in turn was renamed 22 Vanderbilt in late 2022.

== Architecture ==
The Biltmore Hotel was designed by the architectural firm of Warren and Wetmore, which also helped design the adjoining Grand Central Terminal, in the Italian Renaissance Revival style. The building had either 23, 25, or 26 above-ground stories. In addition, the hotel had two basement levels, although the site extended five stories underground. According to plans filed by Warren and Wetmore, the hotel building was 305 feet (93 m) tall. About 12,000 short tons (11,000 long tons; 11,000 t) of structural steel were used in the hotel's construction, along with 5,000 barrels of Portland cement.

The Biltmore occupied the entire city block bounded by Madison Avenue to the west, 44th Street to the north, Vanderbilt Avenue to the east, and 43rd Street to the south, measuring 200 by 215 feet (61 by 66 m). The hotel replaced a four-story post office and ticket office operated by the New York Central Railroad, which was demolished at the beginning of 1912.

=== Form and facade ===
The hotel had a facade of granite, limestone, brick, and terracotta. Although the hotel's main entrance was on 43rd Street, it also had two entrances on Vanderbilt Avenue, which led to different corridors for men and women. The hotel's lowest four stories occupied the entire site. Above the fourth story, the hotel was shaped like a "U", with a light court on Vanderbilt Avenue surrounded by hotel rooms to the north, west, and south. The base was primarily clad in granite. The stories above the base were primarily clad in brick and limestone. The stories directly above the base contained a limestone facade, while the main shaft of the building consisted of a brick facade. The facade used approximately four million pieces of common brick and two million pieces of gray brick.

The building contained 3,000 short tons (2,700 long tons; 2,700 t) of gray architectural terracotta, which one contemporary trade journal described as being one of the largest such terracotta contracts at the time. Above the 21st story, the crown was clad entirely with terracotta and was designed in the Federal style. On all four primary elevations of the facade, there were pilasters and fluted columns extending from the 21st to 23rd stories. Above these columns and pilasters was an arched frieze with ornate spandrel panels.

=== Public spaces ===
The hotel was built above twelve of Grand Central Terminal's railroad tracks. The first story was raised slightly above the ground. The public dining rooms were all at ground level; the southern side of the hotel featured retail space, while the northern half was devoted to more upscale eateries. There were additional ballrooms and meeting spaces on the upper stories.

==== Basement ====
The Biltmore Hotel had its own reception room in the basement, which originally served as a waiting room for intercity trains and was colloquially known as the kissing room. It was completed in 1915 and later became known as the incoming train room and the Biltmore Room. The space is a 64-by-80-foot (20 by 24 m) marble hall northwest of the Main Concourse, serving as an entrance to tracks 39 through 42 within the terminal. The room had a 30-foot-tall (9.1 m) ceiling and seven entrances. The Biltmore Room still exists beneath the modern-day 335 Madison Avenue; a grand staircase, dating from the original hotel's construction, leads to 43rd Street. The room was restored in 1985 after the rest of the hotel had been demolished. In the 2010s, the room was converted to an entrance for the Long Island Rail Road's Grand Central Madison station as part of the East Side Access project.

The basement connected directly with Grand Central Terminal's upper platform level. The hotel was also connected to the New York City Subway's Grand Central–42nd Street station, as well as to neighboring buildings, via the terminal's corridors. According to The New York Times, a passenger arriving at Grand Central "will be able to go directly from his seat in the Pullman to his room in the hotel, not only without having stepped from under cover, but without once having passed beyond what will really be one structure". The passageways from the former Biltmore's basement to the terminal still exist as of 2019; the passageways are protected as New York City designated landmarks, as are other parts of Grand Central Terminal. On the 44th Street side of the hotel was a sloped driveway to the basement, which was used as a taxi ramp and featured a vaulted ceiling with Guastavino tiles. Although the driveway still exists as of 2013, it leads to a garage. The Biltmore formerly shared its garage with the Commodore Hotel.

One of the hot rooms in the Victorian-style Turkish baths

Next to Grand Central, a stairway from the main entrance descended to a grill room, bar, and men's clubroom in the basement. These spaces were all designed in the Elizabethan style, with oak furnishings; marble and wood floors; and paneled walls and pilasters that reached the ceiling. The grill room's ceiling was composed of English-style plasterwork in low relief. In 1924, these spaces were replaced with stores and an arcade that extended between 43rd and 44th Streets. There were 11 stores facing Madison Avenue, each measuring 16.5 by 43.5 feet (5.0 by 13.3 m) across, as well as three additional booths that opened into the arcade. In addition, there were Victorian-style Turkish baths and a swimming pool in the basement. The Turkish baths in the basement had been converted into a health club by the late 20th century. In 1962 a women's parlor room, with red decorations, was added in the basement.

==== Ground level ====
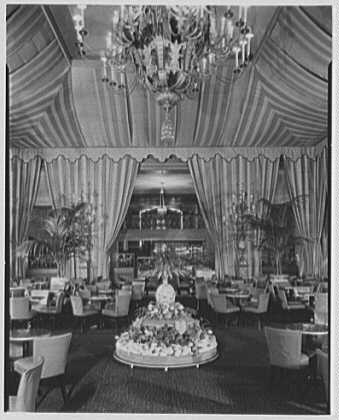
The Palm Court, 1956

The southern half of the ground level contained writing and reception rooms for men, while the northern had similar rooms for women. Adjacent to the 43rd Street entrance was the hotel's main office. About one-third of the ground floor was underneath a skylight, above which were the hotel's air shafts.

A corridor led west from the 43rd Street entrance to the men's dining room and main dining room on Madison Avenue. Women's lounging rooms were on the north side of the corridor between the main entrance and main dining room. The main dining room covered 40 by 120 feet (12 by 37 m). It had dark-oak furniture and red carpets, upholstery, and window draperies; gold-colored decorations of birds and festoons; and marble walls and pilasters. The dining room's ceiling contained three glass chandeliers and Elizabethan-style gold-on-white decorations of classical figures in low relief. The men's dining room was 40 by 80 feet (12 by 24 m) and was designed in a similar style to the main dining room.

The Palm Court and a main lounging room were next to the main dining room. The space connected the men's and women's rooms at ground level. The Palm Court had marble walls with bronze decorations. In the center of the room a gilded clock measuring 2.5 by 4 feet (0.76 by 1.22 m) across was displayed; it consisted of two dials flanked by a pair of sculpted nude figures. The room also incorporated skylights and palm trees. The Palm Court's elliptical vaulted ceiling was interrupted by elliptical arches with carved friezes. The Palm Court became a popular meeting place; after the Biltmore Hotel closed, the Palm Court's clock was reinstalled in 335 Madison Avenue's lobby.

To the east of the lobby was a nightclub known as the Bowman Room, which opened in October 1936. The space hosted performers such as Horace Heidt and Carmen Cavallaro. The room was renovated in 1942, and a bar was installed in the room in 1947. The shows in the Bowman Room were discontinued permanently in September 1949 after the federal government imposed a 20 percent excise tax on such shows. The Bowman Room was converted into a furniture storage room at some point before the hotel closed in 1981.

==== Upper stories ====
There were mezzanines above the ground level. The mezzanine contained writing rooms for both genders, as well as hairdressing, reception, and cloak rooms for women. Directly above the dining room were the kitchen and refrigeration boxes. Similar hotels at the time had kitchens in their basements, but the Biltmore Hotel had a limited amount of space in its basement because of the presence of railroad tracks. There was also a library on the second floor, while the fourth floor had private dining rooms. The kitchen, mezzanines, and dining spaces were all illuminated by natural light. In 1928, Leonard Schultze of Schultze & Weaver designed a Gothic-style meditation room on the third floor, with oak paneling, stained glass windows, and red draperies.

On Vanderbilt Avenue, there was a roof garden along the sixth-story setback, with flower beds, shrubs, grass, a fountain, and shaded walkways. Known as the Italian Garden, it was transformed into an ice skating rink during the winter months. This roof garden also featured terracotta caryatids. It was sheltered by a pergola that ran the entire width of the facade from 43rd to 44th Street. Initially, the roof garden was open only during tea time.

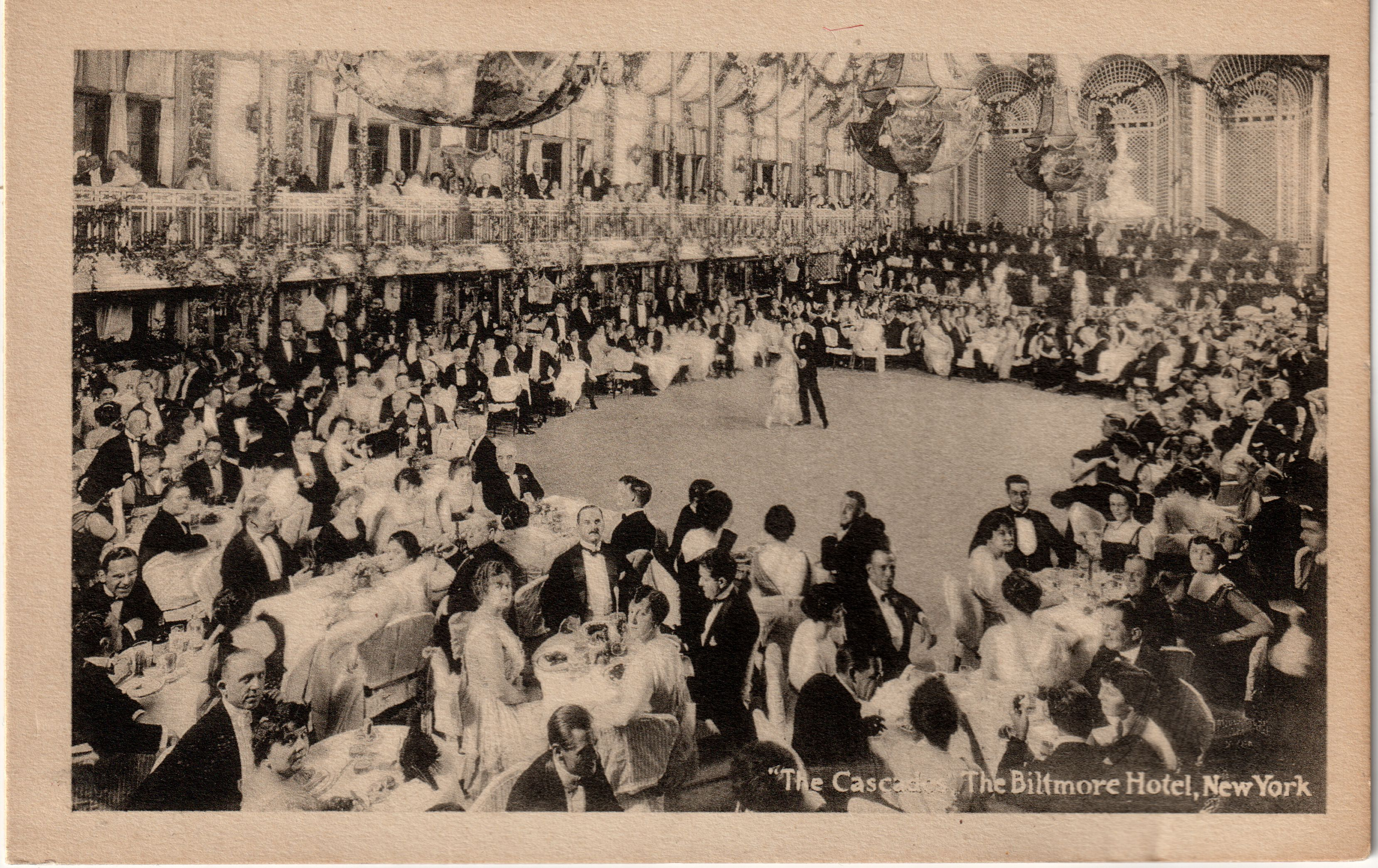
The Cascades ballroom, circa 1910s

On the 23rd story of the hotel was the grand ballroom and banquet hall. The grand ballroom was called the Cascades because there was a large waterfall at one end. It was designed in the Louis XVI style and was decorated in a gold and blue color scheme. The ballroom and banquet hall contained loges, with box seating, on three sides. The ballroom also had movable windows, which measured 10 by 25 feet (3.0 by 7.6 m). The ballroom was typically used for lunch, dinner, and banquets, although visitors could only enter by invitation. The center of the ballroom was used as a dance floor at night. During the summer months, the hotel's managers could open the windows and convert the ballroom into an open-air loggia; this was a major amenity for guests before air conditioning became popular. The ballroom also had its own foyer, assembly room, lounging room, bar, and kitchen. The space could have a capacity of 600 people. North of the grand ballroom was a first-aid wing.

=== Hotel rooms ===
Private suite, The Biltmore Hotel, New York, 1915

The Biltmore had 1,000 rooms and suites, about 950 of which had their own bathrooms. These rooms were expected to accommodate over 1,200 guests. All rooms and suites faced either the street or the interior light court. Most rooms measured 15 by 20 feet (4.6 by 6.1 m) across, although there were several smaller rooms measuring 12 by 13 feet (3.7 by 4.0 m).

The doors within each room were "noiseless" and had silent locks; according to The Construction News, "no person will be able to disturb another hotel guest by carelessly slamming his door". W. & J. Sloane furnished the rooms. A sample room generally had light-colored walls with white-enameled woodwork; a neutral-colored carpet; cream-colored electric chandeliers; and mahogany bureaus, chairs, dressers, and writing tables. In addition, the curtains were Chinese-inspired designs in blue, black, mulberry, and soft red. The bathrooms had white tiles, while the rooms had "unusually large closets" with coatracks, umbrella holders, and space for hanging clothes. The Biltmore's rooms were generally smaller than those of older hostelries, such as the Hotel Manhattan, which had 600 rooms and had about the same floor area as the Biltmore.

The fourth floor included the Presidential Suite, a private suite for entertaining guests. The Presidential Suite included a parlor, reception room, dining room, foyer, and dressing room, as well as a small ballroom with a capacity of 300 guests. The Presidential Suite had its own elevator leading directly to Grand Central Terminal. During the construction of the Biltmore Hotel, Warren and Wetmore had included space for 12 to 14 private apartments on the 18th through 20th floors. Each of these apartments faced 43rd Street or Vanderbilt Avenue in addition to a light court, and they had between eight and twelve rooms. In contrast to the remainder of the hotel, these private apartments were to be sold to tenants, who would then hire their own architects to design each apartment. The private apartments did not have their own kitchens; instead, they received meals from the hotel's catering service. Otherwise, these suites functioned separately from the rest of the hotel and were rented out for yearlong terms. The hotel also had bedrooms and lounges for the staff.

=== Mechanical features ===
There were eight passenger and five service elevators, as well as several dumbwaiters leading from the kitchen to the upper stories. The elevators were enclosed within glass vestibules on each floor, preventing noise from the elevators from reaching the bedrooms. The elevators led directly from the basement to the ground-floor lobby and upper stories. According to The Sun, guests could have their baggage delivered from the train directly to their rooms without going outdoors.

When the Biltmore was constructed, it had several communication systems; a telautograph, dictograph, telephone, and pneumatic tube systems. The New York Times characterized the systems as "the most complete in existence". In addition, the hotel had a steam plant that was powered by filtered water. Each of the guestroom stories also had a small kitchen for room service, and several of the larger apartments had their own kitchens. The Atlanta Journal-Constitution wrote that some of the Biltmore's mechanical features "threaten the extinction of the bellboy".

== History ==
In the 19th century, New York Central Railroad lines north of Grand Central Depot in Midtown Manhattan were served exclusively by steam locomotives, and the rising traffic soon caused accumulations of smoke and soot in the Park Avenue Tunnel, the only approach to the depot. After a fatal crash in 1902, the New York state legislature passed a law to ban all steam trains in Manhattan by 1908. The New York Central's vice president William J. Wilgus proposed electrifying the line and building a new electric-train terminal underground, a plan that was implemented almost in its entirety. The old Grand Central Depot was torn down in phases and replaced by the current Grand Central Terminal. Construction on Grand Central Terminal started in 1903, and the new terminal was opened on February 2, 1913. Passenger traffic on the commuter lines into Grand Central more than doubled in the years following the terminal's completion.

The terminal spurred development in the surrounding area, particularly in Terminal City, a commercial and office district created above where the tracks were covered. Terminal City soon became Manhattan's most desirable commercial and office district. A 1920 New York Times article stated, "With its hotels, office buildings, apartments and underground Streets it not only is a wonderful railroad terminal, but also a great civic centre." Most of these buildings were designed by Warren and Wetmore, which had also designed the terminal itself. According to Christopher Gray of The New York Times, the Biltmore was "the linchpin of what was called Terminal City", being one of the district's first large buildings. Warren and Wetmore had co-designed the terminal with Reed and Stem, but Warren and Wetmore took full credit for the design of Terminal City. This was because, after Charles A. Reed of Reed and Stem had died in 1911, Warren and Wetmore had secretly renegotiated their architectural contract with the New York Central. The Biltmore was one of several hotels developed in Terminal City, along with other hostelries such as the Commodore, the Roosevelt, and the Barclay.

=== Development ===
As part of the construction of Grand Central Terminal, the New York Central started planning a hotel on the city block bounded by Madison Avenue, 44th Street, Vanderbilt Avenue, and 43rd Street. It was to be one of two hotels adjacent to the terminal; there would be another hotel on Lexington Avenue to the east. The New York Central formally announced plans for the 23-story Biltmore Hotel on Madison Avenue in February 1912; the railroad wanted to maximize usage of the site, which was largely occupied by the new terminal's railroad tracks. The hotel was to be named after the Biltmore Estate in North Carolina, itself named for the last syllable of the Vanderbilt family's name. the hotel would be developed by the New York Central and the New York, New Haven and Hartford Railroad. The New York State Realty and Terminal Company, a division of the New York Central, leased the hotel to Gustav Baumann, operator of the Holland House hotel. In March 1912, Warren and Wetmore filed plans with the New York City Department of Buildings for the 26-story hotel, which was projected to cost US$4.5 million. Baumann hired John McEntee Bowman that May to manage the hotel, and Bowman supervised the Biltmore's development.

Baumann ordered $1 million worth of furniture from W. & J. Sloane, and $800,000 of silverware from the Gorham Manufacturing Company, in mid-1912. The New-York Tribune described the latter contract as "one of the largest ever placed for hotel silverware". That July, the New York Central awarded the Fuller Construction Company a $5.5 million general contract for the hotel's construction; at the time, it was expected that the hotel would be completed by the beginning of October 1913. In addition, the American Bridge Company was hired to manufacture 14,000 short tons (12,000 long tons; 13,000 t) of structural steel for the hotel. By the end of that year, workers were completing excavations on the hotel's site. The Biltmore's construction started in March 1913, and the hotel's structural steel was topped out on August 15, 1913. The construction of the hotel coincided with the completion of Grand Central Terminal's final phase.

The Biltmore was scheduled to open with a party on New Year's Eve 1913, and every table in the hotel's main dining room was reserved in advance of the opening. In the two weeks before the hotel opened, the project employed 1,300 construction workers, who worked 24 hours a day to complete the hotel on schedule. The total cost of construction, including furnishings, was estimated at $10 million. The hotel itself accounted for $5.5 million of this cost, the furnishings $1.5 million, and the land $3 million. At the hotel's opening, its rooms had already been leased for a combined $20 million. In describing the Biltmore's location above a portion of Grand Central Terminal, the Real Estate Record and Guide wrote: "The new Biltmore Hotel will, so far as we can recollect, be the first station hotel of any importance erected in this country." The Biltmore's operators rented the air rights above Grand Central Terminal's tracks, paying the New York Central $100,000 annually.

=== Baumann and Bowman operation ===
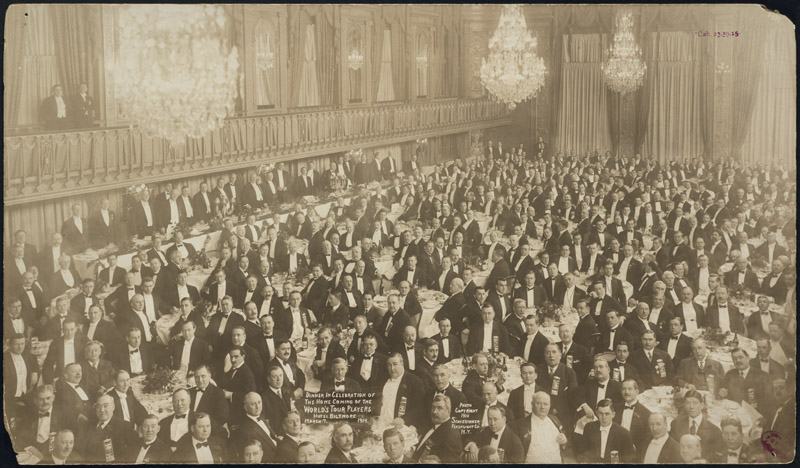
The Biltmore as seen in 1914

The Biltmore hosted its first dinner on December 28, 1913, with a celebration featuring various officials involved in the hotel's construction. The hotel informally opened on December 30, and the first guests arrived at the hotel the next day, December 31. There were also two brokerage offices in the hotel when it opened. In its first year of operation, the Biltmore became extremely popular. Baumann operated the hotel for less than a year; he died on October 15, 1914, after falling from the hotel's roof while observing employees. At the time of Baumann's death, the hotel was valued at $4 million, of which $1.5 million was appraised as goodwill created by the hotel's prominent location in midtown Manhattan. Even so, Baumann had been operating the Biltmore at a net loss at the time of his death. Meanwhile, Allen H. Stem of Reed and Stem had sued Warren and Wetmore over Terminal City's architectural contract. After a protracted legal battle, the New York Supreme Court ordered Warren and Wetmore to pay Stem one percent of the Biltmore's construction cost.

Bowman took control of the hotel's lease shortly after Baumann died. Under Bowman's management, members of the social elite began to frequent the Biltmore. By 1918, the hotel had an annual payroll of over $1 million. After Bowman and rival hotel operator Benjamin L. M. Bates agreed to merge their respective companies in May 1918, the Biltmore became part of the Bowman-Biltmore Hotels chain. Later the same year, Bowman said that the Biltmore, as well as his other hotels near Grand Central and Penn Station, were "doing more business than ever before". Bowman also developed other Biltmore hotels across the United States, all named after the hotel in New York City. After Prohibition in the United States came into effect in 1919, the Biltmore's bar was closed and replaced with a lunch counter. The hotel remained successful through the early 1920s, amid rapid increases in Grand Central's passenger traffic following the terminal's completion.

Bowman announced in July 1924 that the grill room, bar, and men's clubroom would be replaced with stores at a cost of $500,000. By then, the upper-class residences that had characterized the adjacent portion of Madison Avenue in the 19th century were being replaced with retail establishments. Warren and Wetmore designed the modifications. These storefronts were initially leased to tenants in the clothing and textile industries, such as the Gotham Silk Hosiery Company and Edward Gropper Inc., as well as a drug store. Bowman continued to operate the New York Biltmore until he died in 1931, and David Mulligan took over as Bowman-Biltmore's president the next year. During the 1930s, the Biltmore was one of the most expensive hotels in New York City, along with the Chatham, Park Lane, Roosevelt, and Waldorf Astoria. The Canadian Club of New York moved to the Biltmore in 1930, and the Traffic Club of New York relocated its clubhouse to the Biltmore's 18th and 19th floors in 1934. After New York state repealed a Prohibition-era ban on standing bars in May 1934, Bowman-Biltmore Hotels installed a 50-foot (15 m) long bar at the Madison Avenue end of the hotel, replacing a haberdashery there. When the bar opened in 1936 it was open only to men; its guests included New York governor Al Smith.

=== Realty Hotels operation ===
==== 1930s to 1950s ====
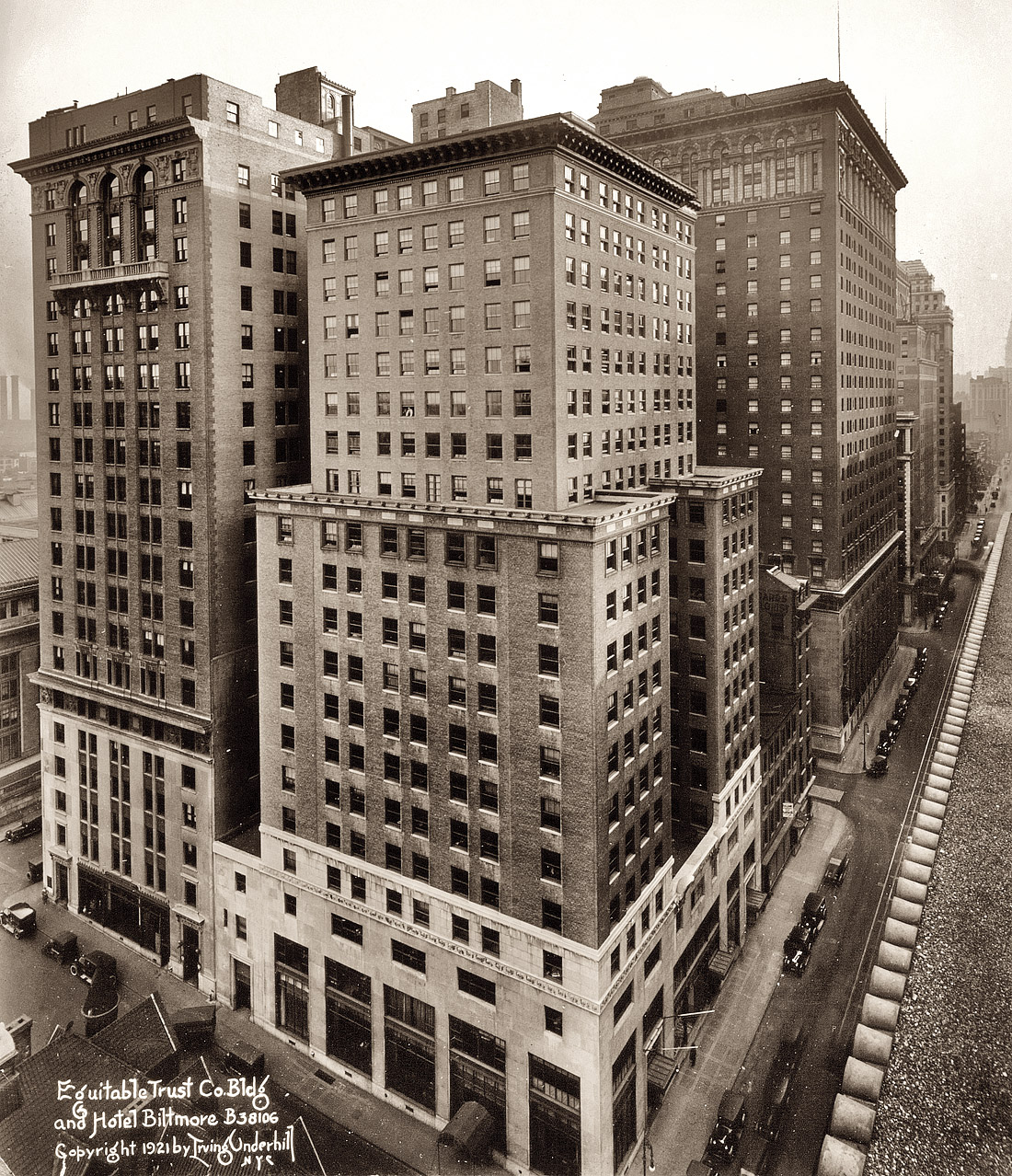
In this image taken in 1921, the Biltmore can be seen at far right, behind the Equitable Trust Company Building (center).

The New York Central canceled Bowman-Biltmore's lease of the Biltmore Hotel in December 1934. The railroad formed a holding company called Realty Hotels Inc. to operate the Biltmore, and Realty Hotels' president David B. Mulligan became the Biltmore's managing director. The New York Central retained full ownership of the Biltmore and other properties around Grand Central Terminal. The Bowman Room, a nightclub at ground level, opened at the hotel in October 1936. When the Chatham and Park Lane hotels became part of the Realty Hotels chain in 1940, Frank Regan, who had managed the two other hotels, took over the Biltmore's management. The Biltmore was booked to capacity during World War II, when politicians and members of the U.S. Armed Forces frequented the hotel. Regan renovated all of the hotel's rooms in the 1940s, although the hotel remained open during the project. The work included replacing the guest rooms' decorations, adding automatic elevators, refurbishing the restrooms, and installing mechanical equipment.

Harry M. Anholt took over as Realty Hotels' president in 1954. During that decade, as part of a $5 million project spanning three hotels, Realty Hotels added 54 guest rooms to the Biltmore's top floor. In addition, the hotel's managers added several executive suites, which were then rented to industries and businesses for year-long terms. The Biltmore also began offering discounts and other sales packages to attract groups and conventions; by 1958, conventions at the hotel were being booked up to two years in advance. Additionally, the Grand Central Art Galleries (founded in 1922 by a group that included Walter Leighton Clark, John Singer Sargent, and Edmund Greacen) moved from Grand Central to the Biltmore in May 1959. The new space, on the hotel's second floor, contained six exhibition rooms and an office. Although the hotel was still profitable, the New York Central as a whole had begun to lose money by the late 1950s.

During this time, the New Haven and the New York Central were involved in a long-running dispute; New Haven officials argued that they were entitled to half of the Biltmore's profits, as the two railroads were equal partners in the terminal's operation. In November 1958, the New Haven indicated that it did not want to renew Realty Hotels' lease of the Biltmore, which was about to expire, as Realty Hotels was a wholly owned subsidiary of the New York Central. The New Haven wanted Realty Hotels to start paying rent directly to Grand Central's manager, which would split the profits evenly between the two railroads. In response, the New York Central ordered the terminal's manager to refuse the payments. A New York state court granted the New York Central a temporary injunction against the New Haven. The New York Supreme Court ruled in September 1960 that the New Haven had the right to collect income from the Biltmore. The Supreme Court's Appellate Division upheld the ruling in 1961, as did the New York Court of Appeals the next year. The New Haven had filed for bankruptcy by then, so a state judge ordered the New York Central to pay $1.6 million to the New Haven's trustees in July 1962.

==== 1960s and 1970s ====
The Parlor Car, a women's parlor room, opened at the hotel in 1962, within a passageway known as the Pullman Corridor. The same year, amid competition from other hotels, the Biltmore, Commodore, and Roosevelt hotels formed an alliance to attract conventions with 1,500 to 5,000 guests. The alliance allowed the three hotels to host a single convention across 4,000 guestrooms, 90 meeting rooms, 15 restaurants, and 50,000 square feet (4,600 m^{2}) of exhibit space. By then, rail traffic had begun to decline with the beginning of the Jet Age and the construction of the Interstate Highway System, and there was also rising demand for office space in Manhattan. During this decade, Realty Hotels replaced about half of the manually operated elevators at the Barclay, Biltmore, Commodore, and Roosevelt, and it renovated these hotels as part of a $22 million modernization plan. Realty Hotels' president said the renovations had helped attract new and returning customers to the hotels. Thomas J. Kane was appointed as the hotel's managing director in 1968.

After the Plaza Hotel opened its formerly men- only Oak Bar to women in 1969 following a series of protests by some women, the Biltmore became the scene of similar protests. The bar's patrons attempted to discourage women from entering by staring at any who tried to enter and applauding until they relented and left. After a 1970 court ruling against gender discrimination, women began entering the bar. The Biltmore initially did not rename the Men's Bar, prompting complaints. The New York City government ordered the Biltmore's managers to rename the bar in 1973, and a New York Supreme Court judge upheld this decision in 1974. The Barclay, Biltmore, Commodore, and Roosevelt began showing in-room movies in 1972. As part of a small refurbishment project, Realty Hotels renovated the main dining room in the mid-1970s. The Palm Court reopened in 1975 as a bar named "Under the Clock", a reference to the famous expression "Meet me under the clock", which the hotel claimed to have been inspired by the famous clock at the Palm Court's entrance. The Biltmore Bar closed permanently at the end of June 1977.

=== 1970s sale ===
The New York Central experienced financial decline during the 1960s, merging with the Pennsylvania Railroad in 1968 to form the Penn Central Railroad. Penn Central continued to face financial issues and failed to make mortgage payments. By late 1970, the Biltmore Hotel was facing foreclosure, as were several other buildings that Penn Central owned around Grand Central Terminal. After Penn Central went bankrupt that year, the company sought to sell its properties, including the land below the Biltmore Hotel. The buildings were placed for auction in October 1971, and UGP Properties made a low bid of $11.65 million for the hotel. The proceedings were delayed for several years. UGP and Penn Central proposed a 56-story skyscraper for the Biltmore Hotel's site in 1972 after Penn Central unsuccessfully tried to replace the adjacent Grand Central Terminal with a skyscraper. Penn Central had placed all of Realty Hotels' properties for sale but subsequently withdrew its offer to sell the hotels. Instead, Penn Central spent $4.5 million renovating the Biltmore, Barclay, and Roosevelt hotels in 1976.

In April 1978, Penn Central requested permission from a federal district court to sell the Biltmore, Barclay, and Roosevelt hotels for $45 million to Loews Hotels. The New York City government also offered the Biltmore Hotel's unused air rights to Penn Central in exchange for allowing the New York City Landmarks Preservation Commission (LPC) to designate Grand Central Terminal as a city landmark, a move that Penn Central opposed. A consortium of Middle Eastern investors subsequently offered to buy the hotels for $50 million. Loews raised its offer for the three hotels to $55 million, and a federal judge approved the sale at the beginning of June 1978. Carter B. Horsley wrote that Loews's purchase of the three hotels "may save their future". At the time, the hotel had 907 rooms.

Loews resold the Biltmore and the Roosevelt to developer Paul Milstein in July 1978 for $30 million. The old Biltmore Bar was replaced in 1978 by the Cafe Fanny restaurant, operated by George Lang, which closed in April 1979. The space, in turn, became a computer store. In the hotel's final years, it became visibly dilapidated, and the owners refused to buy new furnishings, despite a shortage of such objects as tableware and linens. In addition, the Biltmore faced increasing competition from newer hotels, and it was only able to secure "cheap conventions and tourist groups", according to its manager. The New York Times reported that, during the late 1970s, there were rumors that the Biltmore would be converted to another use, rebuilt, or demolished.

=== Closure and replacement with offices ===
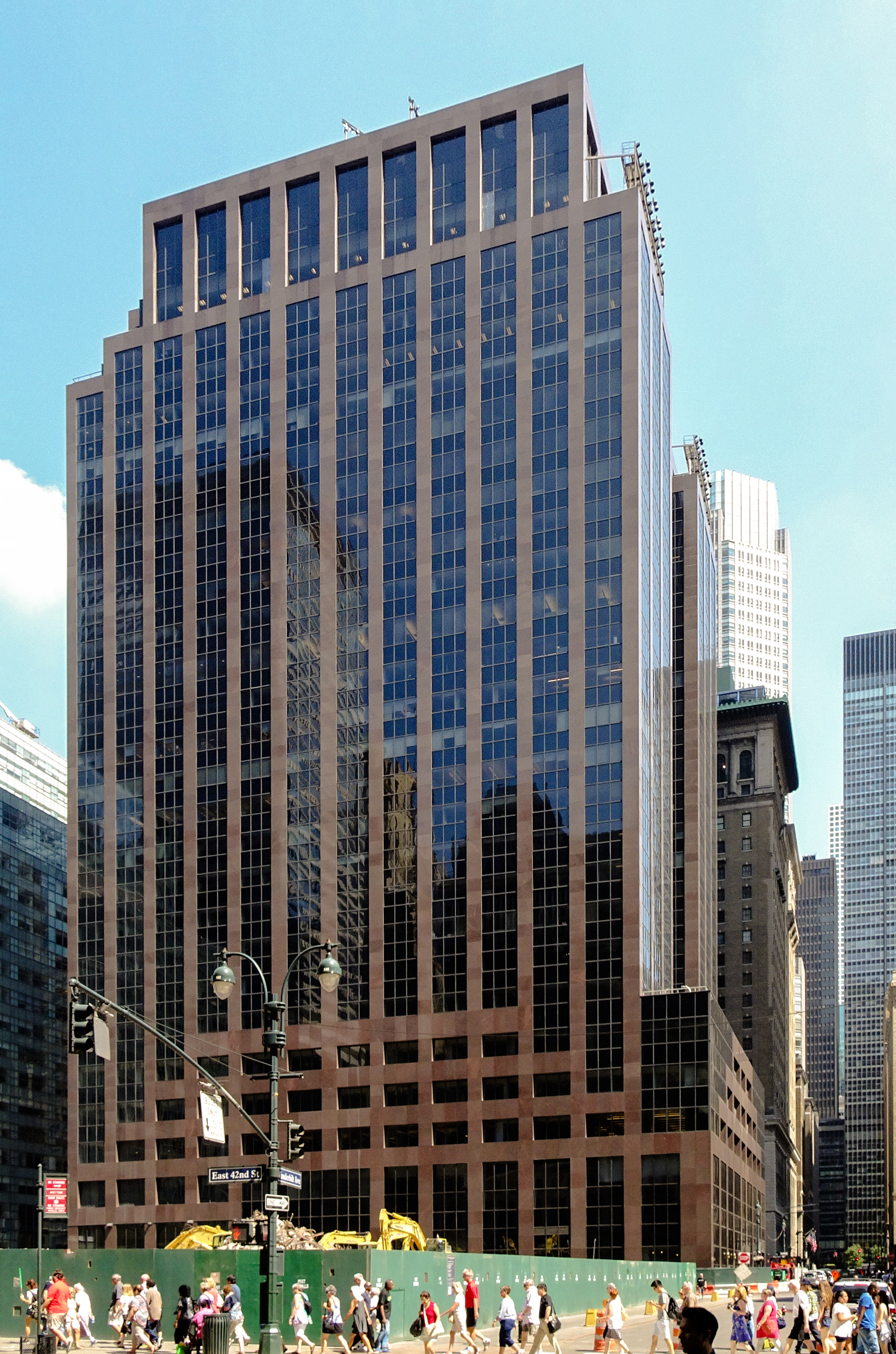
22 Vanderbilt, the former Biltmore Hotel building, seen in 2016

In March 1981, Milstein filed plans with the city to gut the hotel and rebuild it as an office building. Initially, Milstein had planned to replace the facade with a glass exterior similar to that of the Hyatt Grand Central New York. A few months later, Paul Milstein presented plans to the LPC for a proposed modification of the hotel's interior. On July 29, Milstein agreed to rent half of the building to Bank of America. Over the next two days, registered letters were sent to the hotel's residential guests, informing them they would have to move in the near future. After Bank of America's announcement, Seymour and Paul Milstein modified the design of the planned office building, which would now be made of granite. Variety magazine wrote: "The end of the Biltmore comes at a time when the city's hoteliers believe that the golden era of the hotels, which started in 1976, is over."

==== Final days and preservation controversy ====
The Biltmore ceased operations abruptly on August 14, 1981, two weeks before it had been scheduled to close. Overnight guests were informed that the hotel was closing, and permanent residents were given 30 days to leave. Demolition crews entered the same day and began removing decorations, boarding up the Madison and Bowman rooms even as other parts of the hotel remained open. The Palm Court's clock was removed and placed into storage. All but 150 guests had relocated within a day of the announcement, and the Grand Central Art Galleries closed shortly afterward. Describing the end of the Biltmore and the Grand Central Art Galleries' final show there, John Russell of The New York Times wrote: "Hardly since Samson tore down the great temple at Gaza has a building disappeared as rapidly as the Biltmore Hotel. But people have shown a rare persistence this last day or two in pushing their way upstairs at the entrance on Vanderbilt Avenue to where the Grand Central Galleries has been holding its own."

The New York Landmarks Conservancy and the Municipal Art Society filed for and received a temporary restraining order on August 15. Preservationists claimed that the Milsteins had destroyed the public spaces as quickly as possible to prevent it from being preserved. Conversely, a lawyer for the Milsteins said that preservationists had failed to act despite knowing that the hotel building had been leased to Bank of America. Although preservationists requested another restraining order on August 17, they were unable to raise a $75,000 bond to keep the restraining order in place. By then, the Palm Court's French doors, balustrades, and fixtures had already been removed. The Environmental Protection Agency also notified the demolition contractors that they had violated federal asbestos regulations as they were demolishing the Biltmore's interior. The LPC had been considering giving the hotel's interiors landmark status, preventing the Milsteins from further modifying these spaces. By August 18, the restraining orders had expired or been overruled. When LPC officials toured the hotel that same day, the 19th-floor Grand Ballroom was the only public room that was still extant.

The LPC scheduled a hearing on whether the ballroom and exterior should be designated as city landmarks, thus preventing significant modifications to these parts of the hotel. A New York state judge declined to grant further injunctions against demolition. The condition of the ballroom remained uncertain, even though the Milsteins promised to notify preservationists when demolition of the room was to start. On September 9, a week before the landmarks hearings, the Milsteins agreed to reconstruct the hotel's Palm Court, lobby, and main 43rd Street entrance within the office building, so long as the LPC did not designate the spaces as landmarks. The LPC voted against granting exterior and interior landmark statuses on September 16, despite concerted protests by preservationists. In addition, the interiors had been demolished so rapidly that almost nothing was salvageable.

==== Reconstruction as office building ====
The firm Hardy Holzman Pfeiffer Associates (HHPA) was hired as a consultant for the restoration of the Biltmore's public spaces. In August 1982, HHPA resigned, stating that the demolition work had made any re-creation impossible. Norman Pfeiffer of HHPA said the firm had discovered that further demolition had occurred the previous month, to the extent that "there was nothing left to give you even the beginning of a restoration". A settlement was brokered in September 1983, in which the Milsteins contributed $500,000 to a fund operated by the Landmarks Conservancy. The Conservancy had accepted the agreement because a recreation of the rooms inside the office tower would "rightly be perceived by architectural historians and the public at large as resulting in a design that would amount to little more than a caricature." According to Brendan Gill of the Conservancy, the alternative was a lawsuit that might have lasted for several years.

Another firm, Environetics, redesigned the Biltmore. The old hotel was almost entirely gutted, although most of the steel framework was retained. Paul Milstein estimated that the existing steel frame increased construction costs by 25 percent, but it also allowed him to include 200,000 square feet (19,000 m^{2}) more usable space than a completely new building on the site. The two ends of the Biltmore's U-shaped massing were connected, turning the hotel into an "O"-shape. A new elevator core was built and a 28-story atrium was created in the center of the building. The facade was also rebuilt with brown granite, and elevators, heating, cooling, and other mechanical systems were entirely replaced. The lowest three stories were converted into 25,000 square feet (2,300 m^{2}) of retail space.

The Palm Court's clock was the only decoration from the hotel that was preserved. The Metropolitan Transportation Authority owned the driveway on 44th Street and the Biltmore Room in the basement, and a Catholic bookstore occupied a storefront at 43rd Street and Vanderbilt Avenue; these three spaces remained intact. The hotel's redevelopment was temporarily halted in April 1982 after leaks developed in the Biltmore Room. Milstein subsequently paid for a restoration of the Biltmore Room, which reopened in April 1985 following a renovation designed by Giorgio Cavaglieri.

==== Office use ====
Bank of America had started moving into the 2nd through 14th floors of the structure by late 1983, and the former Biltmore reopened on May 15, 1984, as Bank of America Plaza. Initially, Bank of America only occupied half of the 28-story building. Other tenants included telephone company NYNEX on the 20th and 21st floors; real-estate services firm Landauer Associates on the 18th floor; and the Union Bank of Bavaria and Westpac on one floor each. When Bank of America Plaza opened, several other large banks were relocating to Madison Avenue. Paul Goldberger criticized the new design, saying, "Now the East Coast headquarters of the Bank of America, this is a bloated, heavy form of glass and polished granite, unrelieved by any of the gracious ornament that made the old Biltmore so beloved a presence." Further tenants moved into the building in the 1990s, such as the American Management Association and the New York Life Insurance Company.

Bank of America relocated to 1 Bryant Park in 2010 and the structure became known by its address, 335 Madison Avenue. By the 2010s, the building's tenants included several technology companies, such as Addepar and Facebook Inc. During that decade, city government officials sought to change zoning regulations around Grand Central Terminal as part of the Midtown East rezoning plan. After the Midtown East rezoning was announced, Paul Milstein's son Howard Milstein indicated in 2015 that he wanted to construct a larger office tower with a luxury hotel on the site. Milstein subsequently decided to renovate the existing building and add an atrium lobby for US$150 million to designs by SHoP Architects. In addition, 335 Madison Avenue was rebranded as The Company Building, and its space was advertised to technology startups.

The renovation was largely completed by the end of 2019. The building was again renamed in late 2022, becoming 22 Vanderbilt. As of 2024, the building's major tenants included Bain & Co.

== Guests ==
Among the hotel's early guests was William H. Newman, president of the New York Central Railroad, who lived there until his death in 1918, as well as architect William Rutherford Mead of the firm McKim, Mead & White, who was recorded as living at the Biltmore in 1919. During the 1920s, New York governor Al Smith also occupied a suite of rooms in the Biltmore Hotel.

=== Use as meeting place ===
Christopher Gray wrote in 2013, "The Biltmore, and in particular its clock, became almost as much an institution as Grand Central itself." The reclusive writer J. D. Salinger frequently met William Shawn, the editor of The New Yorker, under the Biltmore's lobby clock. Writer F. Scott Fitzgerald was also among those who met "under the clock at the Biltmore". In the hotel's heyday, hundreds of young women met with each other under the Biltmore's clock. Additionally, for several decades, the Belmore Cafeteria at the Biltmore Hotel was a common gathering place for New York City's taxi drivers.

The hotel was a popular meeting place for college students because of its proximity to Grand Central Terminal, as well as to several clubs for Ivy League alumni. The New York Herald Tribune wrote in 1956 that up to 2,000 students gathered at the hotel on Fridays and Saturdays. During some holidays, more than half of the hotel's total revenue came from college students; in many cases, 16 to 18 students would book rooms at the same time. To attract these students, the hotel offered discounts of 40 to 60 percent. The New York Times wrote in 1957 that the hotel was "the unofficial headquarters here for college and preparatory schools". In 1970, the Young Women's Towne House took over 32 rooms at the hotel, renting the rooms to young women at discounted rates.

=== Democratic Party use ===
The Biltmore was also frequented by Democratic Party politicians, who frequently conducted deals at the hotel's Turkish baths and rented the function rooms during elections. This trend had started in the 1930s, when Democratic Party chairman James A. Farley established a command post there. During the 1932, 1936, 1940, 1944, and 1948 U.S. presidential elections, the Democratic National Committee operated its national campaign out of the Biltmore Hotel. Democratic presidential candidate Franklin D. Roosevelt also had his national campaign headquarters there in 1932, 1936, and 1940. The Democratic Party occupied all of the hotel's second floor until 1962. Employees frequently described Farley, merchant Bernard F. Gimbel, and boxer Gene Tunney as part of "the Order of the Biltmore Baths" because they frequented the hotel's Turkish baths. At the time of the Biltmore's closure in 1981, several prominent Democrats still occupied offices on the mezzanine, including Tammany Hall chief Carmine DeSapio and former New York Democratic Party chairman Michael H. Prendergast.

== Events ==
Soon after the Biltmore opened, it began hosting annual events, including New York Hotel Men's Association parties, Old Guard balls, and National Horse Show dinners. Additionally, in 1915, Henry Ford tried to broker a truce agreement to halt World War I while headquartered at the Biltmore. On August 4, 1916, the Treaty of the Danish West Indies was signed at the hotel, which transferred possession of the Danish West Indies, now the United States Virgin Islands, from Denmark to the United States. Other events at the hotel included a 1915 luncheon in honor of U.S. president Woodrow Wilson; a 1931 dinner in which the main ballroom was decorated to resemble the horse-racing track at Belmont Park; and a 1936 luncheon in honor of Madison Avenue's centennial.

From May 6 to 11, 1942, the hotel was the location of the Biltmore Conference, a meeting of Zionist groups that produced the Biltmore Program, a series of demands regarding Palestine. Soviet president Nikita Khrushchev and industrialist Cyrus S. Eaton ate lunch at the hotel in 1960, drawing widespread protests. In its later years, the Biltmore largely hosted conventions, such as a biennial convention of the American Jewish Congress.

== See also ==
- List of former hotels in Manhattan
