= Wilgus State Park =

State park in Vermont, United States

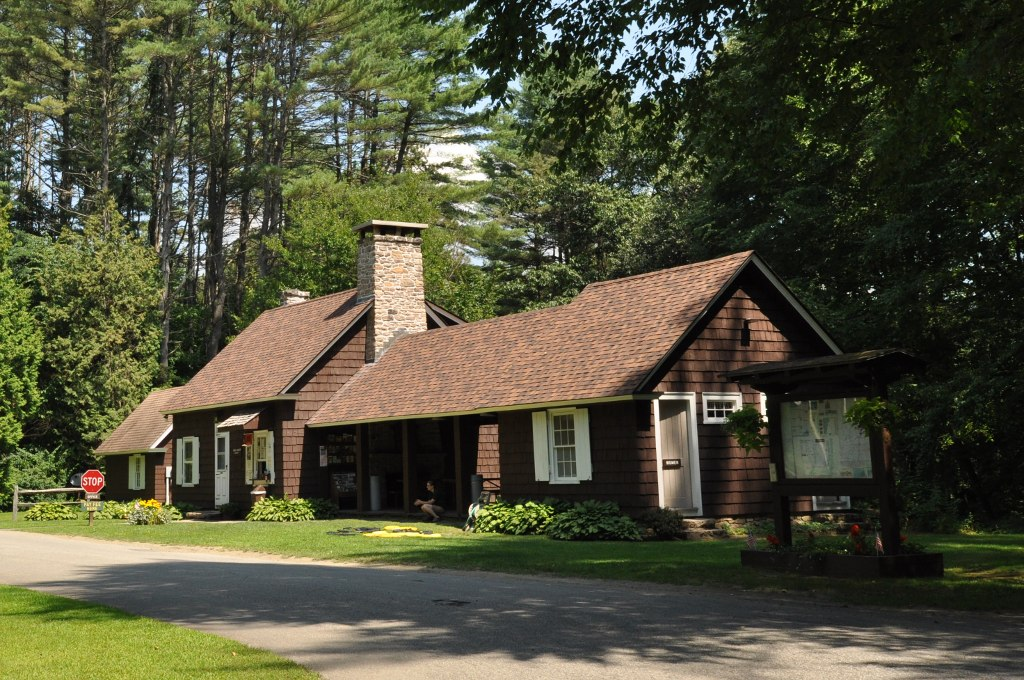
- Entrance station, built by the CCC
- Interactive map of Wilgus State Park
- Type: State park
- Location: Ascutney, Vermont
- Coordinates: 43°23′22″N 72°24′27″W
- Area: 100 acres (40 ha)
- Operator: Vermont Department of Forests, Parks, and Recreation
- Status: Open between Memorial Day and Columbus Day weekends
- Website: https://vtstateparks.com/wilgus.html

Wilgus State Park is a state park in Ascutney, Vermont. The park offers canoeing along the Connecticut River and hiking up the Pinnacle Trail. The park has tent and lean-to sites and is quite close to Mount Ascutney and the Saint-Gaudens National Historic Site. The park was originally constructed by the Civilian Conservation Corps (CCC) and is now administered by the Vermont Department of Forests, Parks, and Recreation as part of the Vermont state park system. It is named after William J. Wilgus, who donated the land for the park in 1933. The park is listed on the National Register of Historic Places for its well-preserved CCC infrastructure.

== Setting ==
Wilgus State Park is located on the western bank of the Connecticut River in central eastern Weathersfield. The park's 100 acres (40 ha) are roughly bisected by United States Route 5, from which the main access road enters the park. The park is heavily wooded, with most of its improvements between US 5 and the river. To the west of the road the terrain rises steeply to a promontory called Pinnacle Point, which is accessible via hiking trails. It is a few miles south of Weathersfield's town center, which is itself just south of Mount Ascutney, the area's most prominent peak.

== Features ==
The park access road enters from the east side of US 5 near the middle of the park, and snakes its way north, roughly paralleling the highway. Between the entry and the river is the picnic area, with a group camping area just to its south. The contact station and ranger residence is just to its north, separated from the highway by a grassy area. It also includes handicapped restroom facilities. North of the contact station is the campground, with 15 campsites, 4 cabins, and 6 leantos. The campground is equipped with a comfort station and dump station. Water spigots are provided in both the campground and picnic area. A hand-carry boat launch on the river is provided in the campground area.

Two trails lead from the developed area to Pinnacle Point. One leaves from near the comfort station in the campground, and the other begins across the highway from the contact station.

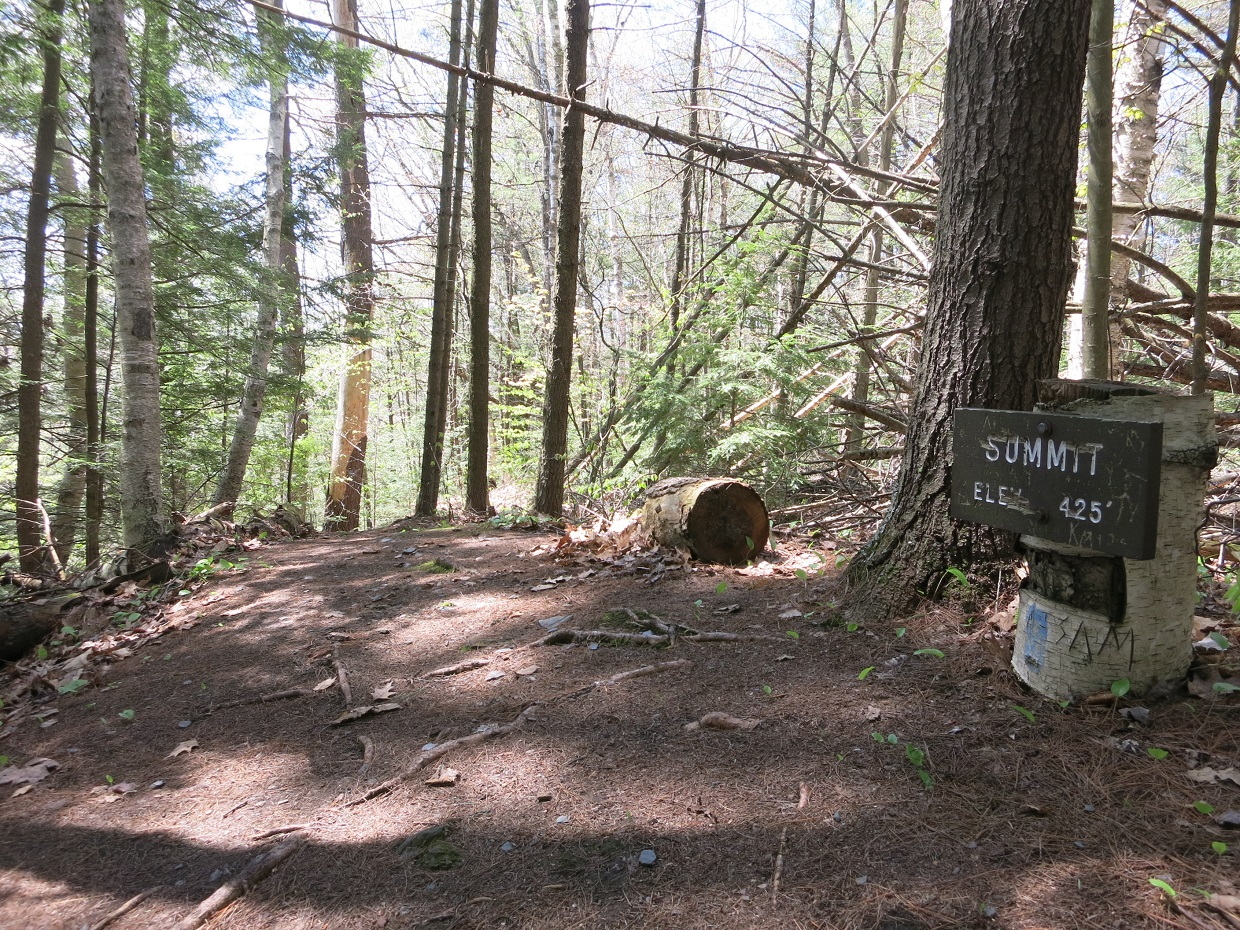
Pinnacle Point summit sign

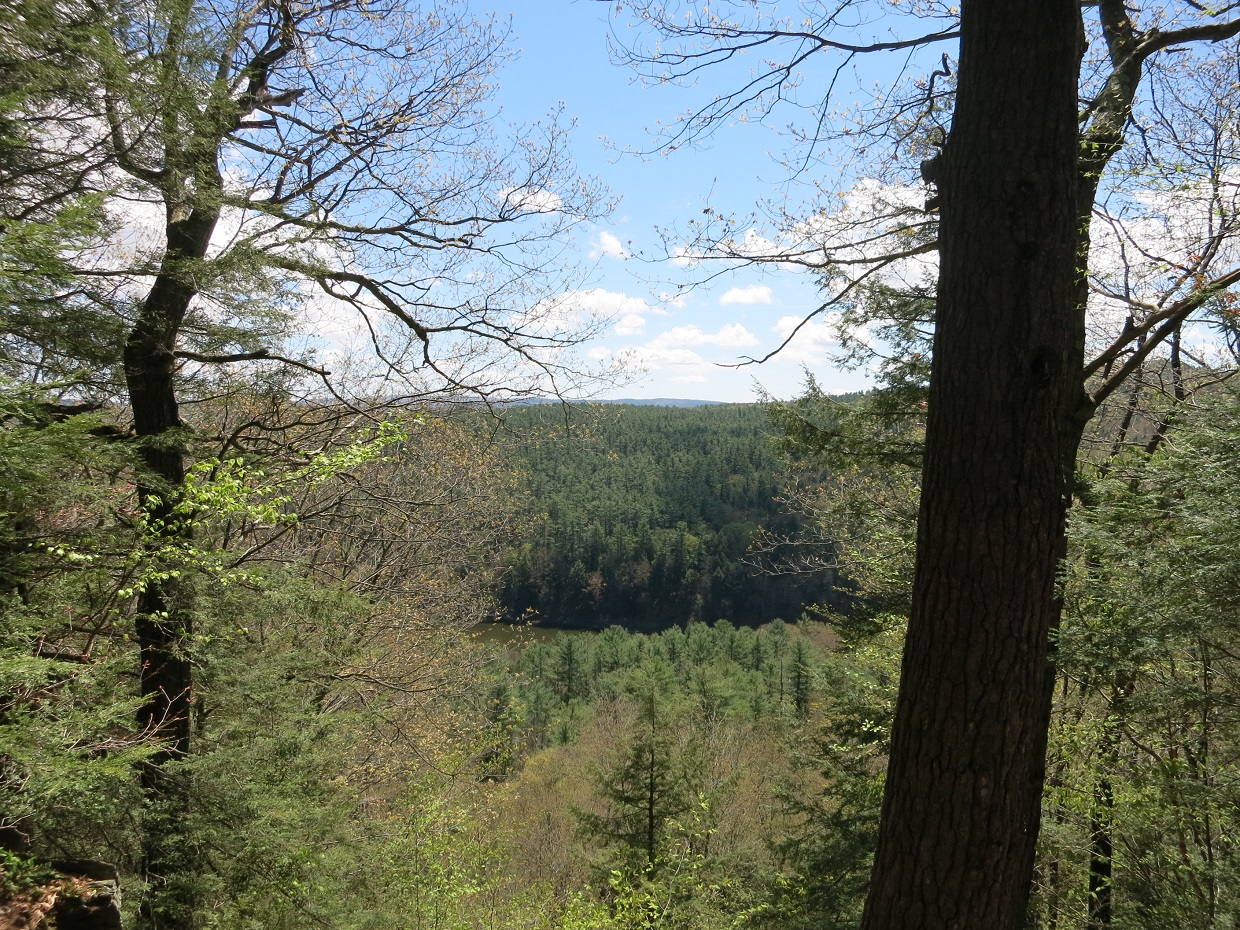
View east from near Pinnacle summit

== History ==
The park's land was given to the state in 1933 by William J. Wilgus, an engineer best known for his work in the design and construction of New York City's Grand Central Terminal. The park's early infrastructure was built out by crews of the Civilian Conservation Corps, a Depression-era works project, in 1935 and 1936. Surviving elements of this early work include the contact station, the trails to Pinnacle Point, stone posts for the gates flanking the main entrance, and numerous stone fireplaces located in the campground and picnic area. The campground, leantos, and boat launch were all developed in the 1960s or later.

== See also ==
- National Register of Historic Places listings in Windsor County, Vermont
