= Frank A. Ready =

Waldorf-Astoria general manager Frank A. Ready with the Duke and Duchess of Windsor, 1950s, exact date unknown

Frank A. Ready (1884–1961) was a hotel man, working mostly in New York City from 1903 until his death in 1961.

He served at the Waldorf-Astoria in Manhattan from 1931 to 1961, including many years as resident manager. He greeted visitors including Charles de Gaulle, Queen Elizabeth and presidents Dwight Eisenhower and Herbert Hoover. He was acquainted with residents and regular guests, including The Duke and Duchess of Windsor, and Gen. Douglas MacArthur.

In 1920, The New York Hotel Review called him “one of the outstanding figures among the rising younger men in the hotel field.” At the time, he was chief assistant manager of the Hotel McAlpin. The story notes that he was chairman of the committee in charge of the upcoming New York Greeters Ball, an event for hotel industry staff to be held in the Hotel Biltmore.

Frank A. Ready and Gen. Dwight Eisenhower

President Eisenhower sent a letter to Mr. Ready, noting that “This is a well-deserved tribute to and executive who has devoted fifty years of his life to the exacting business of making others feel at home, away from home."

From the program of the “Testimonial Dinner to Frank A. Ready for fifty years of distinguished service to the hotel industry. The Plaza, Tuesday June thirtieth, 1953” “Frank A. Ready is a man who richly deserves the tribute accorded him tonight. He has been active in his chosen work for fifty years and has a multitude of friends throughout the world in hotels and allied fields as well as in public and private life. If all the people who have been greeted by his friendly smile and firm handshake were gathered together at one time, there would not be room enough for them in the ballroom of the Waldorf-Astoria, the hotel where he has spent so many years."

== Biography ==
Ready was born in Hoosick Falls, New York. He started his hotel career in 1903 in the Cooley House, Springfield, Massachusetts and then went on to the Hotel Russwin in Meriden, Connecticut. He came to New York City in 1906, and until 1924, was associated with the Knickerbocker and McAlpin hotels and helped open Roosevelt Hotel on 45th street. In 1929, Guy Lombardo and His Royal Canadians its first New Year's Eve at the Roosevelt Hotel with the old Scottish song, "Auld Lang Syne." The tune becomes the band's signature. The News Year's eve concert was moved to the Waldorf in 1966.

During 1925 and 1926 he traveled between the Bellevue Stratford in Philadelphia, the new Willard in Washington, the Hotel Windsor in Montreal and the old Waldorf, all under the supervisions of Lucius Boomer. In 1927, he went to the Park Lane and the Barclay in New York, before rejoining the Waldorf-Astoria, where he has been serving as an executive since 1931. He has the envious record of continuous successful employment for fifty years.

In the 1953 book Confessions of a Grand Hotel, author Horace Sutton described ready as one of the Waldorf's "talent scouts." along with Boomer and Sonny Werblin of MCA.

"The strove for the unusual, took chances with newcomers on the rise, booked acts that seemed incongruous in the Waldorf," he wrote. Acts included Edgar Bergen, Victor Borge, Xavier Cugat, Dinah Shore. Benny Goodman and Frank Sinatra were "caught on the crest of acclaim."

In August 1944, Werblin stopped into Ready's office to tell him that Boomer-- who was out of town -- had asked for someone "new and different or a young talent on the rise."

Ready recalled telling him " 'I could suggest someone who is new and upcoming.'" Werblin had just signed Frank Sinatra. "Werblin was out of his chair. 'My God, do you think Boomer would stand for it?' Ready reminded him that the Waldorf had already withstood the onslaught of Benny Goodman and the jitterbugs." Boomer hedged, Ready pushed and Sinatra was booked. Sonny Werblin.

For many years, he was the President of the International Greeters, through which he met many famous people. He was a member of the Board of the Hotel Associations of New York City and New York State. Ready was the first man to give a course on Front Office Practice at the School of Hotel Administration at Cornell University. He was a long-time, active member of the Knights of Malta. On August 9, 1911, he married Ethel M. Severs and they have two sons, Robert and Frank, who both attended the Cornell Hotel School"

In 1949, he was featured in the documentary film Mighty Manhattan, New York's Wonder City. In it, he escorts the actress and dancer Ann Miller to a gala in the Starlight Roof Ballroom.
