= John R. Caswell =

American pharmacist

John Rose Caswell
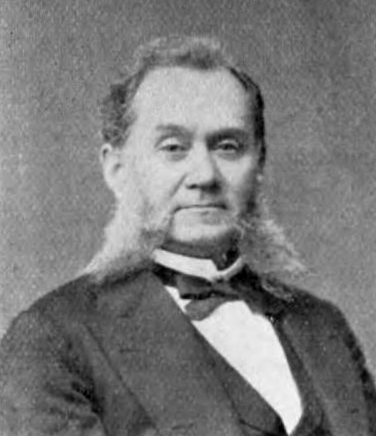
- Born: September 18, 1834; Jamestown, Rhode Island
- Died: March 9, 1918 (aged 83); Newport, Rhode Island
- Occupation(s): Businessman, pharmacist
- Spouses: Mary Ellen Gray (later married George M. Lavery); Mary E. Stuart (m. 1913) Ann E. Albro

John Rose Caswell (September 18, 1834 – March 9, 1918) was an American businessman, pharmacist, and long-time trustee and later a vice-president of the College of Pharmacy of the City of New York, incorporated into Columbia University in 1904.

== Biography ==
John R. Caswell was born to Philip and Elizabeth (Rose) Caswell in Jamestown, Rhode Island on September 18, 1834. He continued his father's apothecary business which started in Newport in 1780, which eventually formed into Caswell, Massey & Co. of New York, with the first branch opening in 1859. The Caswell, Massey apothecary business is still operating as of 2021, and is one of America's longest continuously running businesses.

He served as a trustee of the College of Pharmacy of the City of New York from 1887 to 1893, and as a vice-president from 1893 to 1897, 1898 to 1900, and 1903 to 1904.

He married a Miss Lavery, and they had one daughter. He remarried to Mary E. Stuart on April 15, 1913.

Caswell died at his home in Newport, Rhode Island on March 9, 1918.
