= Caswell-Massey =

American perfumer

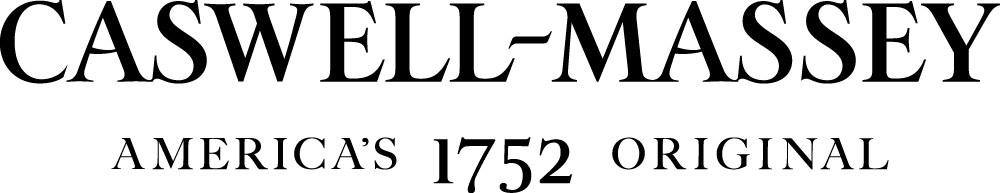
- Industry: Cosmetics
- Founded: 1752; 274 years ago
- Founder: William Hunter
- Headquarters: Edison, New Jersey
- Products: Cosmetics; Perfume
- Website: caswellmassey.com

Caswell-Massey, founded in 1752, is an American fragrance and personal care product company. Originally, Caswell Massey started as an apothecary shop in Newport, Rhode Island, by a Scottish-born doctor named William Hunter. The main product categories include fine-fragrance, soap, bath & body products, men's shaving products and toiletries and other assorted apothecary-style personal care accessories. Its products were preferred favorites of notable historical figures such as John F. Kennedy, George Washington, Cole Porter, Alla Nazimova, John Denver, and The Rolling Stones.

The company is regarded as the fourth-oldest continuously operating company in America and the oldest American consumer brand in operation. The current motto of Caswell-Massey is "America's Original".

Dr. William Hunter established Dr. Hunters Dispensary in Newport in 1752. Caswell Massey began as an apothecary shop selling medical supplies. Hunter gave the first lectures on anatomy and surgery in the Colonies in 1755 and invented orange soda to help his customers take the medicines sold in his apothecary shop.

At the time, Newport was a destination for the social elite to buy European-style luxuries. While selling medical products, Dr. Hunter also began selling cosmetic, personal care, and hygiene products and developed a business in medicinal essential oils, such as lavender and verbena. He also imported fragrances from Europe, and blended 20 of his own different colognes, numbered One through Twenty; Dr. Hunter's Cologne Number Six was often purchased by George Washington and was given as a gift by Washington to the Marquis de Lafayette, and thereby became very popular among many politicians and intellectuals in early American society after Independence. During the same time, White Rose perfume was introduced for women and became a favorite of Dolley Madison, who was rumored to bathe in the perfume. The shop was also known for its very high-quality Castile soap, which was purchased by Lewis and Clark for their Western expedition.

For approximately the first three-quarters of a century, the apothecary shop traditionally changed owners, each retiring pharmacist handing over the keys to his apprentice. Dr. William Hunter was followed by his son, also William Hunter, then by Charles Feke, who in turn was followed by Rowland Hazard in 1822. Hazard took Philip Caswell into partnership, and the name became Hazard & Caswell. In 1833 following Rowland Hazard's death, the company became Caswell & Hazard. The first Caswell-Hazard branch opened in New York City in the same year.

A fragrance called Jockey Club was introduced in 1840. During that time, the company continued to expand its line to include other apothecary products, including cucumber night cream, oatmeal soaps, goat's milk soaps, and other items. In the 1850s, Hazard formed a partnership with Phillip Caswell, and later in 1867, was joined by both John R. Caswell (Phillip's brother) along with J. Hazard (who was likely Rowland's brother or son).

Phillip Caswell resigned from the partnership in 1872 and sold his shares to Rowland Hazard; John Caswell set up shops and continued the business in parallel to the Hazard business during this time, and a lawsuit was undertaken in 1876 over the rights to be the successor of both the 'Caswell' name and the 'Established 1780 AD' trademark, as well as the books of formulations. Caswell was triumphant in the suit, proving in the court records that they had sold the physical shops and shop fixtures and stock in labels but not the name or formulations rights.

It is unclear whether the Hazards were given the exclusive right to claim the 'Established 1780 AD' mark. Nevertheless, Caswell also succeeded on this point, as it was later established that the business was established by Dr. Hunter in 1752 and not by Feke in 1780 – that had merely been the ruse, as mentioned earlier, that was used to prevent the firm from being confiscated under disloyalty to the new American government. The company took its present name, Caswell-Massey, when then-owner John Rose Caswell partnered with New York businessman William Massey in 1876. With rightful ownership of the original formulations of Dr. Hunter and a new partnership with William Massey, a Canadian doctor, the firm rightly claimed the 'Established 1752' trademark and provenance for their brand. That year, the company operated two stores, one in Newport and one in New York City. John R. Caswell and William Massey continued to operate in New York City and Newport, RI, until 1906, when the business was incorporated as the Caswell-Massey Company under the guidance of George C. Lyon and John C. Knight of the Hall & Lyon Company of Providence, Rhode Island; the business continued to grow to ten stores but was reduced to two stores by 1915.

== 1906–1936 ==
During the early to mid-1900s, the apothecary business expanded its service to provide 'custom' perfumes and fragrances as private stock for its most notable customers. Customers who used this service were interviewed on their food, music, and lifestyle tastes and given five fragrances to try. After some time, their favorite fragrance was selected, and five variants were created. After a final period of wearing these, the customer's signature fragrance was refined and bottled and could be ordered on demand. This was an expensive service at the time, costing customers up to $200 per ounce. A second gentleman's scent, Newport, was added in 1890.

Customers to the Caswell-Massey stores during this time included many notable New Yorkers, as well as Broadway stars such as Alla Nazimova, and New York elite such as the Astors and Vanderbilts; George Gershwin, Judy Garland, Katharine Hepburn and Greta Garbo. In 1926 a store was opened on Lexington (the 48th in New York City), in what was then the Barclay Hotel, later InterContinental New York Barclay Hotel. ( It remained the company's flagship store until 2010, when the Barclay's Hotel was closed for renovations).

In 1936, Ralph Taylor and his younger brother Milton Taylor bought the company. Ralph had worked for Caswell-Massey for twenty years since 1916, when a 13-year-old Ralph Taylor was hired to sweep the shop and clean bottles in the basement. Unlike the previous owners, the Taylors retained the name Caswell-Massey, which had acquired a worldwide reputation during the 60 years under Caswell as one of the world's most important fragrances and soap brands.

== 1940–1956 ==
In 1941, Caswell-Massey introduced Tricorn cologne and expanded its notoriety among the New York elite. The company's cold cream was a popular product for many Broadway actors, along with composer Cole Porter who wore the new Tricorn cologne.

Beginning in March 1955, Caswell-Massey was subject to a 20-month-long strike by the Retail Drug Employees Union Local 1199, triggered after a soda fountain washer claimed he had been fired because of his union membership. The store was picketed, delivery drivers were threatened or beaten, phone lines were jammed, and a stink bomb was thrown into the store. The phone-jamming operation resulted in felony convictions of several union organizers.

== 1960–1988 ==
During the second half of the century, clients included United States President John F. Kennedy, who wore Caswell Massey's Jockey Club cologne; his wife, Jacqueline Onassis (who bought avocado oil), and pop culture figures who shopped from the company's famously hand-illustrated direct mail catalog and who frequented the company's Lexington Avenue Store. Patrons at the Lexington & 48th street store included Debbie Harry, Joni Mitchell, John Denver, and the Rolling Stones. In the 1980s, the company expanded across the United States and added several overseas stores.

Caswell-Massey was managed by the Taylor family from 1936–1989. Milton's older son Adam joined the company in 1974 and soon became president, and his younger son Joshua joined in 1979. When they started working at Caswell-Massey, the company had only one store. However, the new younger Taylor blood injected fresh energy into the enterprise. Over the next ten years, they added 20 more retail stores and about a dozen franchise stores spread throughout the US and Canada. Also, during that time frame, Josh oversaw and overhauled the extensive product lines and assortments offered by the company and introduced or re-packaged 600 Caswell-Massey branded products, and together with the retail store expansion, the company grew ten times in sales.

Josh created and introduced Greenbriar cologne in 1984.

== 1988–2007 ==
The Taylors sold the company to private owners in 1988; at the time, the company had over 28 stores in the US; the company continued with modest growth under new owners for several years before taking a downturn due to rising competition from mall competitors such as Crabtree & Evelyn (founded in 1972) and Bath & Body Works (founded in 1990) which offered similar products, albeit with less history. In 1999, after struggling for several years, Anne Robinson led a buyout of the company. Under Anne Robinson's leadership, the company experienced a brief turnaround and celebrated its 250th anniversary in 2002. Modest growth and international business continued for the company. Anne Robinson departed the company in 2003. After trading hands between various investors, the company was purchased by its current ownership in 2007.

== Re-branding & re-launch ==
As of 2017, the company remains privately owned and operated in America, headquartered in Edison, New Jersey. The company re-branded in 2017, including the launch of a new website and catalog. Updated formulas, new fragrances, and a new fragrance bottle design have been re-released.
