= Traffic Club of New York =

The Traffic Club of New York is a Manhattan-based professional association composed of members who work in the transportation industry. Participating members operate the day-to-day logistics of many American rail, trucking, and shipping corporations.

== Club history ==
The Traffic Club of New York (TCNY) was created by a number of transportation magnates at the Arkwright Club on April 10, 1906, in reaction to Congress passing the Carmack Amendment to Interstate Commerce Act of 1887 and the Hepburn Act.

Since 1907 the TCNY has held an annual dinner, which became a prominent Club event, suspended only during World War II. The Club dinner provides food, entertainment, and allows businessmen to make connections.

== Presidents ==
The following people have served as President of the Traffic Club of New York:

- B.D. Caldwell (1906)
- D.W. Cooke (1907)
- George T. Smith (1907)
- C.S. Keene (1908)
- George A. Cullen (1909)
- Judge G.F. Moore (1010)
- F.E. Herriman (1911)
- E.G. Warfield (1912)
- A.F. Mack (1913)
- R.H. Wallace (1914)
- W.C. Hope (1915)
- Thomas Gantt (1916)
- T.N. Jarvis (1917)
- W.L. Woodrow (1918)
- Ralph S. Stubbs (1919)
- Fred E. Signer (1920)
- R.J. Menzies (1921)
- T.T. Harkrader (1922)
- Frank W. Smith (1923)
- W.A. Schumacher (1925)
- W.S. Cowie (1926)
- H.C. Snyder (1927)
- Charlton A. Swope (1930)
- Louis M. Porter (1932)
- Ralph P. Bird (1933)
- J.W. Roberts (1934)
- Charles W. Braden (1935)
- Henry R. McLean (1938)
- James M. Breen (1945)
- E.A. O'Brien (1956)
- Eugene V. Fitzpatrick (1980)
- William B. Rose (1981)
- Greg Snyder (2014)

== Annual Dinner Guest Speakers ==
The annual Club dinner has had many notable guest and keynote speakers, including the following:

- Charles Evans Hughes (1907) Governor of New York
- Isaac Asimov (1981) Scientist, futurist
- David Paterson (2012) Governor of New York
- Admiral Edward M. Straw (2015)
