= William J. Wilgus =

American civil engineer (1865–1949)

William John Wilgus
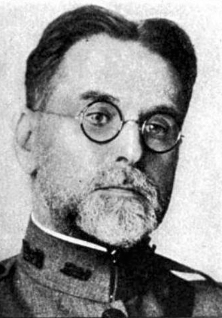
- Born: November 20, 1865; Buffalo, New York, US
- Died: October 24, 1949 (aged 83); Claremont, New Hampshire, US
- Education: Cornell University
- Spouses: May Reed (m. 1892; died 1918) Gertrude Bernadette Tobin (m. 1919)
- Children: 2
- Engineering career
- Projects: Grand Central Terminal
- Significant design: Wilgus-Sprague Third Rail System
- Awards: Telford Medal
- Military career
- Branch: United States Army
- Rank: Colonel
- Conflicts: World War I
- Awards: Distinguished Service Medal

William J. Wilgus (1865–1949) was an American civil engineer. In 1902 he was responsible for the design and construction of New York City's Grand Central Terminal. Wilgus coined the term "taking wealth from the air" from his idea to lease the area above the Park Avenue Tunnel in order to help finance the station. This is based on the legal concept known as air rights. He is also credited with the double-stacked track design of the station, that greatly increased its capacity. During the First World War, Wilgus served as the American Expeditionary Force chief of logistics and rail transport.

== Biography ==
William John Wilgus was born on November 20, 1865, in Buffalo, New York, the son of Frank Augustus Wilgus and his wife Margaret Ann Woodcock.

Wilgus graduated from Buffalo Central High School in 1883. He studied for two years under a local civil engineer and took a Cornell correspondence course in drafting, 1883–1885, ending his formal education. Afterward, Wilgus embarked on what would soon become a prominent career in civil engineering. Wilgus worked on some of the largest and most complex railroad projects during his time.

== Career ==
After high school he was privately tutored in engineering before accepting his first position as a rodman and draughtsman for the Minnesota and Northwestern Railroad in 1885. Wilgus rose rapidly in his profession. In 1893 he began his association with the New York Central and Hudson River Railroad as an assistant engineer on its Rome, Watertown and Ogdensburg line. By 1899 he became the railroad's chief engineer for construction and maintenance of way (track) and in 1903 became the vice-president in charge of construction. During these years he supervised the planning and construction of Buffalo Union Station, the Michigan Central Railway Tunnel and the Weehawken Terminal.

In 1907 Wilgus was forced to resign from the New York Central and Hudson River Railroad after a crash involving the new electric locomotives he had helped to develop killed 20 passengers. Sixteen died on impact, and four more died in the hospital. The victims were mostly women and children. Anxious to defend his reputation, he carefully documented the design decisions, but the railroad's lawyers forced him to destroy his papers, fearing that they would be brought into court as evidence. To keep the railroad from pinning the blame on him, he reconstructed the documentation and used its existence to keep the railroad from throwing him to the wolves. Wilgus went on to open his own consulting practice. He advised numerous railroad companies on construction and improvement projects and on the valuation of their holdings. He also worked with several states and municipalities including several concerned with the improvement of passenger and freight transportation in the New York Metropolitan area. He was awarded a Telford Medal by the Institution of Civil Engineers in their 1910–11 session.

Wilgus was appointed director of military railways and deputy director of general transportation in the American Expeditionary Forces; he retired with the rank of Colonel and a Distinguished Service Medal.

== Personal life and death ==
In 1892, he married Mary Reed. In 1933, Wilgus donated land in Weathersfield, Vermont to the state for use as a state park; developed in the 1930s by the Civilian Conservation Corps, it is called Wilgus State Park in his honor.

Wilgus died on October 24, 1949. He is buried with his second wife (m. 1919) Gertrude Bernadette Tobin (February 18, 1873, in Twillingate, Newfoundland Colony – 1959) at Union Cemetery, Claremont, New Hampshire. By his first wife Mary Reed (May 6, 1864, in New York State – October 2, 1918, in Manhattan, New York County, New York), his children included:

- Margaret Fitch Wilgus (December 12, 1892, in Minnesota – May 31, 1919, in Manhattan, New York County, New York; aged 26); she married August 4, 1911, in Westchester County, New York, to medical student Clarence Howard Smith (February 1891 in New York City – March 10, 1918), son of Joel Sumner Smith and Mary Baese; one son:
  - Clarence Aldrich Smith (1912–1976); had issue.
- William John Wilgus Jr. (b. September 1898 in Minnesota)

== Accomplishments ==
- Along with Frank J. Sprague, designed and patented in 1908 the Wilgus-Sprague bottom contact third rail system.
- President of the American Society of Civil Engineers New York chapter (1920–1921)
- Honorary doctorate in engineering from the Stevens Institute of Technology (1921)
- Honorary doctorate in engineering from the University of Vermont (1927)
- Served as a colonel in the United States Army in World War I, directing all logistics and rail transport, decorated with the Distinguished Service Medal for his accomplishments.
