= Grand Central Terminal =

Railway terminal in Manhattan, New York

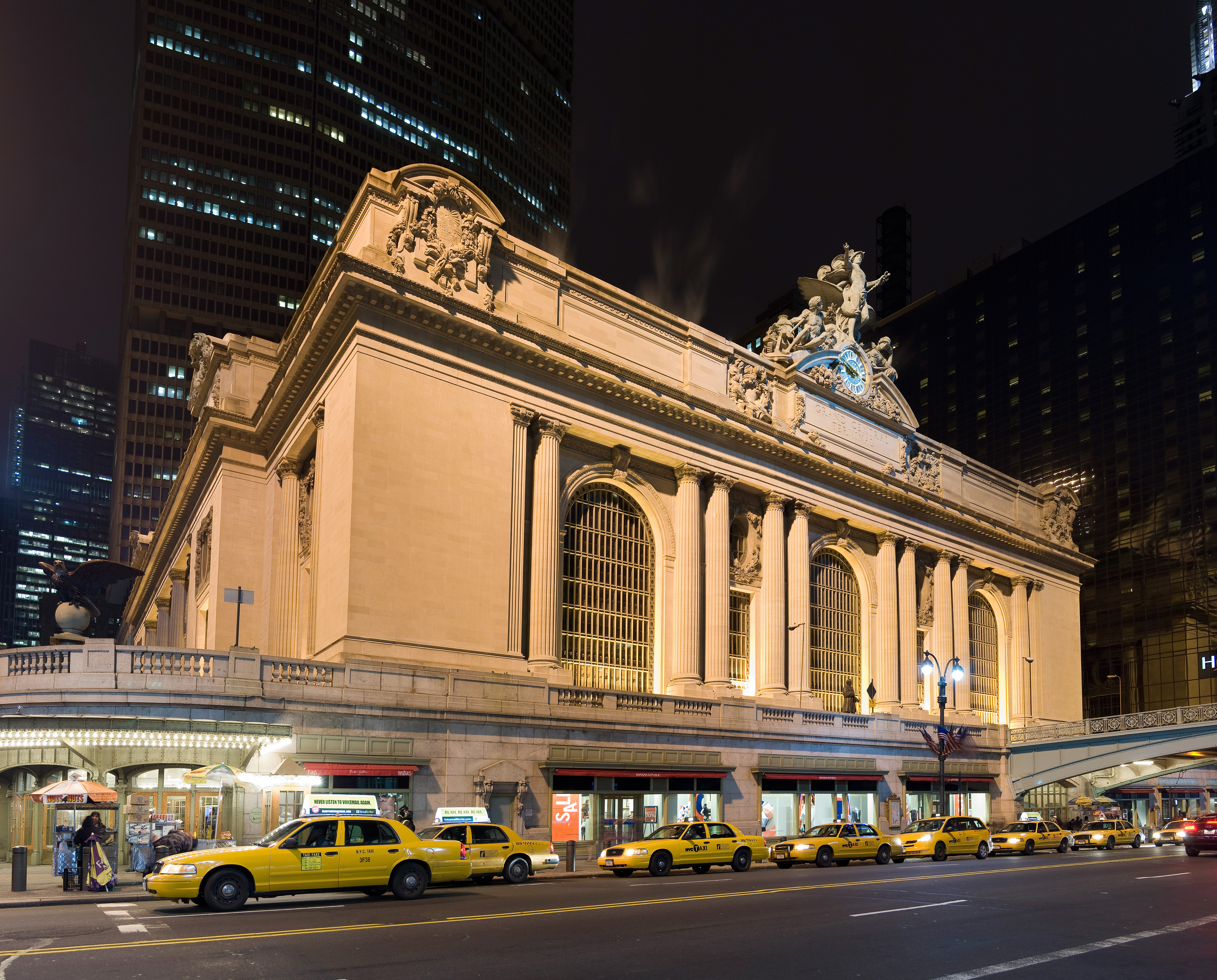
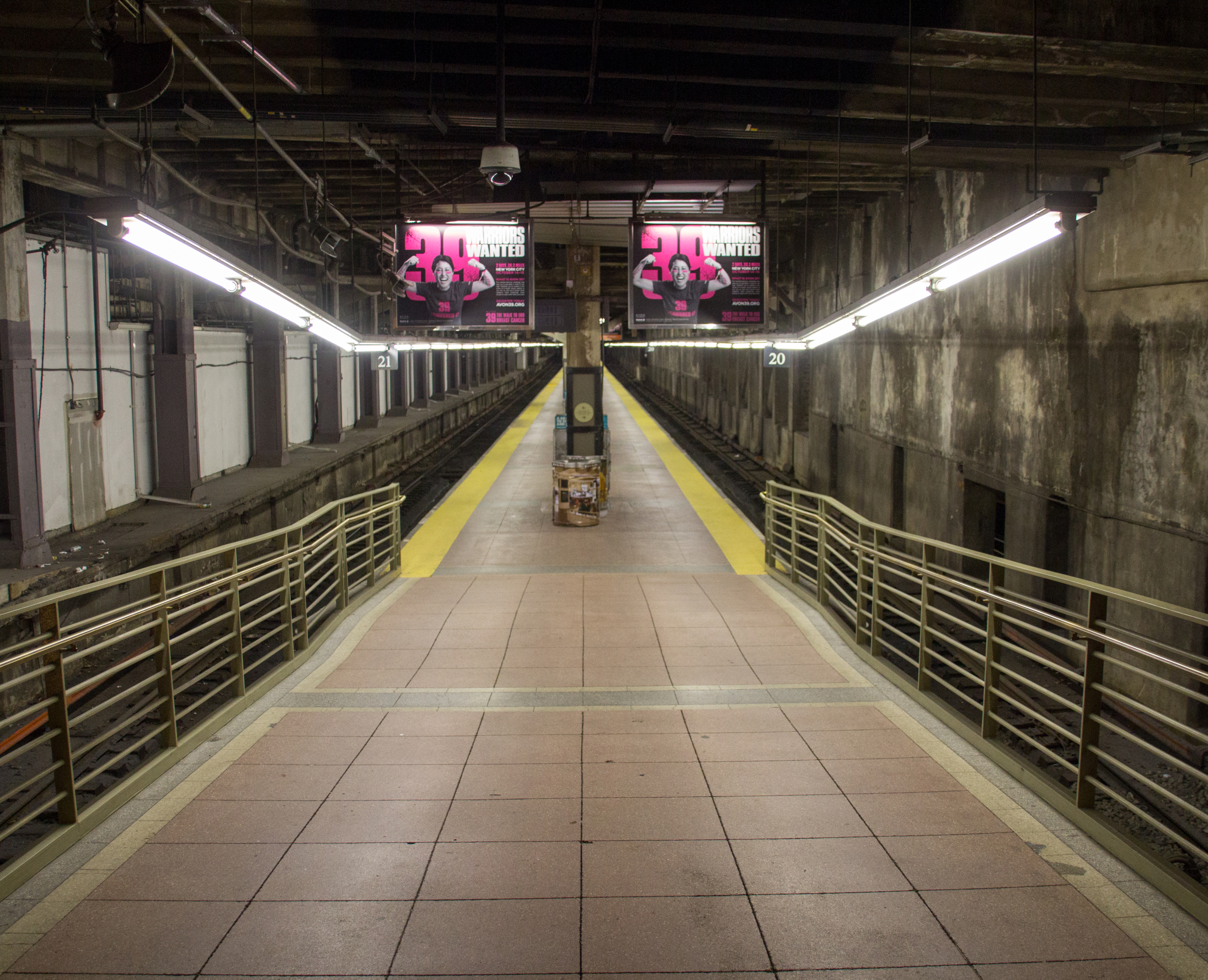
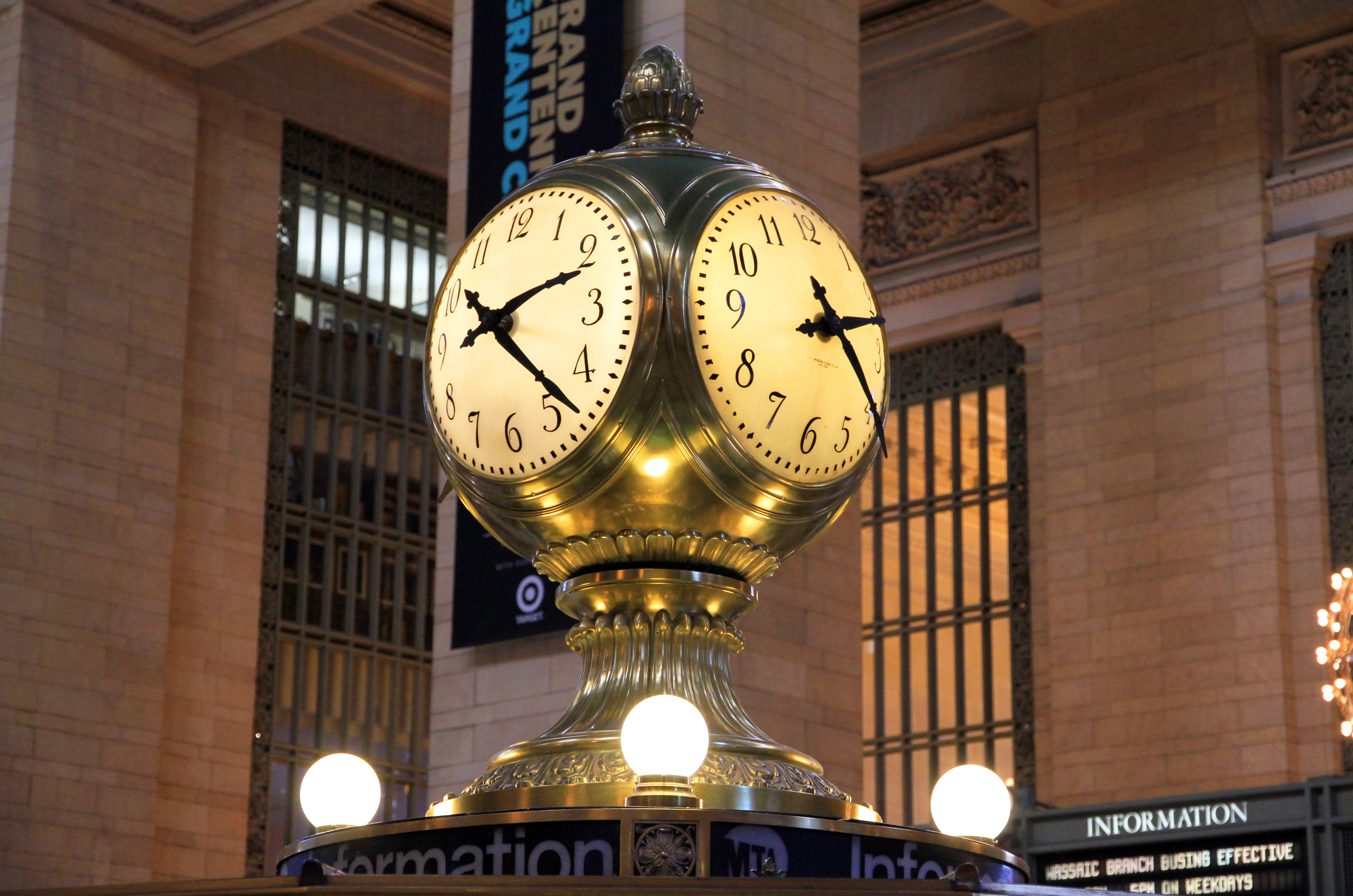
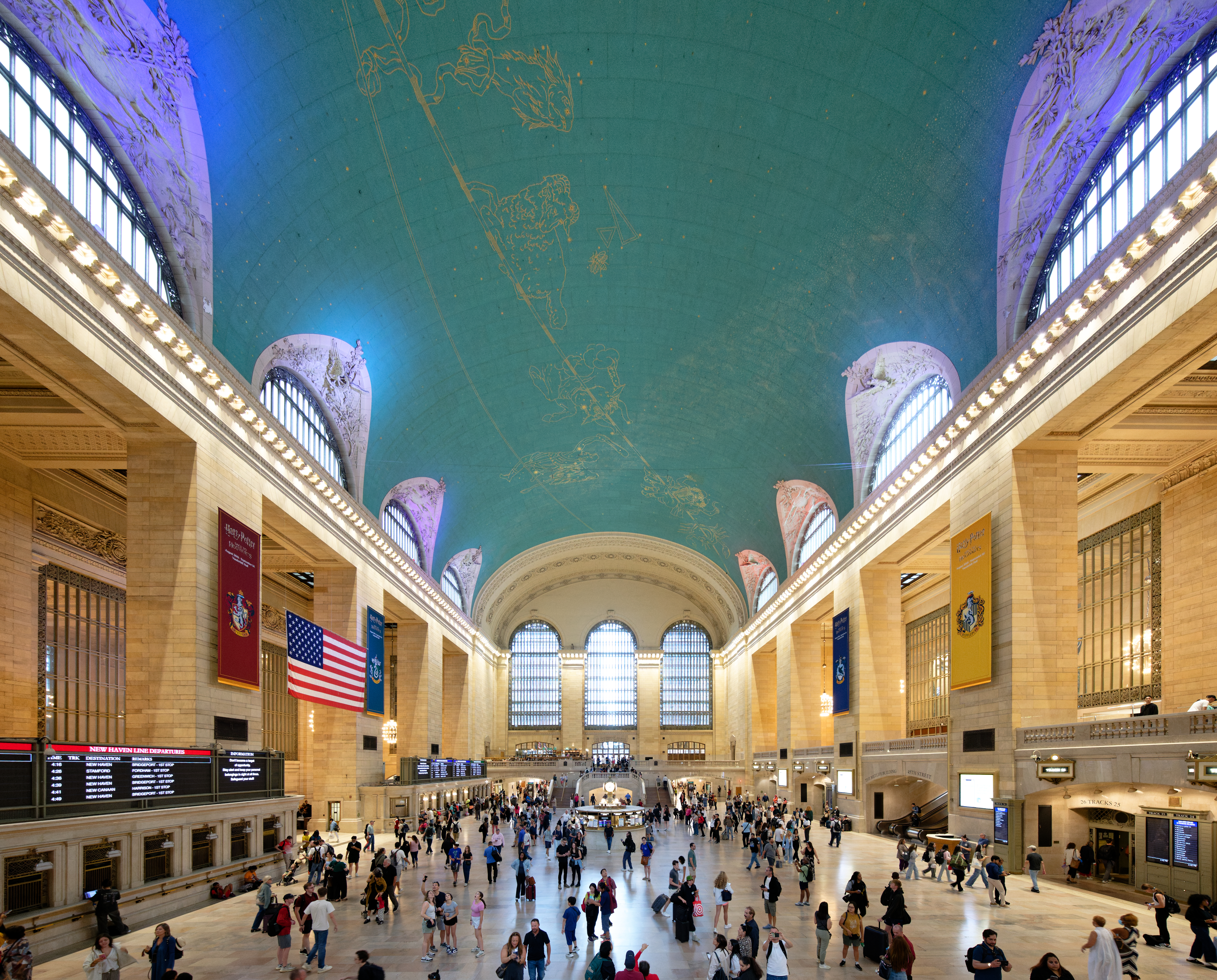
- Top: The terminal's logo features an interlocking G, C, and T. Below: Clockwise from top left: 42nd Street facade; underground Metro-North platform and tracks; Main Concourse; iconic clock atop the information booth

General information
- Location: 89 East 42nd Street; Manhattan, New York City, U.S.
- Owner: New York Central & Hudson River Railroad (1913‍–‍1914); New York Central Railroad (1914‍–‍1968); Penn Central Transportation Company (1968‍–‍1994); American Premier Underwriters (1994‍–‍2006); Midtown Trackage Ventures (2006‍–‍2020); Metropolitan Transportation Authority (2020‍–‍present)
- Operator: New York Central & Hudson River (1913‍–‍1914); New York Central (1914‍–‍1968); New York, New Haven and Hartford Railroad (1913‍–‍1968); Penn Central (1968‍–‍1976) (Note: Terminal operations were leased for 90 years to the Metropolitan Transportation Authority on June 1, 1972.); Amtrak (1971‍–‍1991); Conrail (1976‍–‍1983); Metro-North Railroad (1983‍–‍present)
- Manager: George Monasterio (director)
- Line: Park Avenue main line
- Platforms: 44: 43 island platforms, 1 side platform (6 tracks with Spanish solution)
- Tracks: 67: 56 passenger tracks (30 on upper level, 26 on lower level); 41 in use for passenger service (28 on the upper level, 13 on the lower level); 11 sidings
- Connections: Long Island Rail Road at Grand Central Madison; New York City Subway: at Grand Central–42nd Street NYCT Bus: M1, M2, M3, M4, M42, M101, M102, M103; MTA Bus: Q32 NYCT Bus, MTA Bus, Academy Bus: express services

Construction
- Platform levels: 2
- Accessible: Accessible (Note: Grand Central Terminal meets Americans with Disabilities Act (ADA) requirements. However, not all features are fully ADA-accessible.)

Other information
- Website: Official website

Key dates
- Construction: 1903–1913; Opened February 2, 1913; 113 years ago

Passengers
- FY 2018: 67 million annually, based on weekly estimate ▲0.6% (Metro-North)

Services
Preceding station	Metro-North Railroad	Following station
Terminus	Harlem Line	Harlem–125th Street toward North White Plains, Southeast or Wassaic
Terminus	Hudson Line	Harlem–125th Street toward Croton–Harmon or Poughkeepsie
Terminus	New Haven Line	Harlem–125th Street toward Stamford or New Haven
Terminus	New Canaan Branch weekday service	Harlem–125th Street toward New Canaan
Terminus	Danbury Branch weekday service	Harlem–125th Street toward Danbury
Former services
Preceding station	New York Central Railroad	Following station
125th Street toward Chicago	Main Line	Terminus
125th Street toward Peekskill	Hudson Division	Terminus
125th Street toward Chatham	Harlem Division	Terminus
Preceding station	New York, New Haven and Hartford Railroad	Following station
Terminus	Main Line	Harlem–125th Street toward New Haven
Preceding station	Amtrak	Following station
Croton-Harmon toward Chicago	Lake Shore	Terminus
Croton-Harmon toward Detroit (Michigan Central)	Niagara Rainbow	Terminus
Yonkers toward Montreal	Adirondack	Terminus
Yonkers toward Niagara Falls, New York	Empire Service	Terminus
Yonkers toward Toronto	Maple Leaf	Terminus
Former services (pre-1913)
Preceding station	New York Central & Hudson River Railroad	Following station
110th Street Until 1906 toward Peekskill	Hudson Division	Terminus
86th Street Until 1901 toward Chatham	Harlem Division	Terminus
72nd Street Limited toward Chatham	Harlem Division	Terminus
- Interactive map
- 40°45′10″N 73°58′38″W

Site notes
- Architect(s): Reed and Stem; Warren and Wetmore
- Architectural style: Beaux-Arts
- Visitors: 21.6 million (in 2018)

U.S. National Historic Landmark
- Designated: December 8, 1976
- Reference no.: 75001206

U.S. National Register of Historic Places
- Designated: January 17, 1975; August 11, 1983 (increase)
- Reference no.: 75001206, 83001726

New York State Register of Historic Places
- Designated: June 23, 1980
- Reference no.: 06101.000365

New York City Landmark
- Designated: August 2, 1967 (facade); September 23, 1980 (interior)
- Reference no.: 0266 (facade); 1099 (interior)
Location

Grand Central Terminal (GCT; also referred to as Grand Central Station or simply as Grand Central) is a commuter rail terminal at 42nd Street and Park Avenue in Midtown Manhattan, New York City. Grand Central is the southern terminus of the Metro-North Railroad's Harlem, Hudson and New Haven Lines, serving the northern parts of the New York metropolitan area. It also serves the Long Island Rail Road through Grand Central Madison, a 16-acre (6.5 ha) addition to the station located underneath the Metro-North tracks, built from 2007 to 2023. The terminal also connects to the New York City Subway at the Grand Central–42nd Street station. The terminal is the third-busiest train station in North America, after New York Penn Station and Toronto Union Station.

The distinctive architecture and interior design of Grand Central Terminal's station house have earned it several landmark designations, including as a National Historic Landmark. Its Beaux-Arts design incorporates numerous works of art. Grand Central Terminal is one of the world's ten most-visited tourist attractions, with 21.6 million visitors in 2018, excluding train and subway passengers. The terminal's Main Concourse is often used as a meeting place and is especially featured in films and television. Grand Central Terminal contains a variety of stores and food vendors, including upscale restaurants and bars, a food hall, and a grocery marketplace. The building is also noted for its library, event hall, tennis club, control center and offices for the railroad, and sub-basement power station.

Grand Central Terminal was built by and named for the New York Central Railroad; it also served the New York, New Haven and Hartford Railroad and, later, successors to the New York Central. Opened in 1913, the terminal was built on the site of two similarly named predecessor stations, the first of which dated to 1871. Grand Central Terminal served intercity trains until 1991, when Amtrak consolidated its New York operations at nearby Penn Station. (Note: Prior to the consolidation, the track layout of the railroads meant that some Amtrak trains could only stop at Penn Station while others could only stop at Grand Central. Once the Empire Connection was ready to use, Penn Station became accessible from all approaches to New York, so Amtrak moved all of its trains there.)

Grand Central covers 48 acres (19 ha) and has 44 platforms, more than any other railroad station in the world. Its platforms, all below ground, serve 30 tracks on the upper level and 26 on the lower. In total, there are 67 tracks, including a rail yard and sidings; of these, 41 tracks are in use for passenger service, while the remaining two dozen are used to store trains. (Note: The 24 non-passenger tracks include 11 sidings that are not adjacent to any platform, and 13 tracks that are adjacent to platforms but not used in passenger service.)

== Name ==
Grand Central Terminal was named by and for the New York Central Railroad, which built the station and its two predecessors on the site. It has "always been more colloquially and affectionately known as Grand Central Station", the name of its immediate predecessor that operated from 1900 to 1910. The name "Grand Central Station" is also shared with the nearby U.S. Post Office station at 450 Lexington Avenue and, colloquially, with the Grand Central–42nd Street subway station next to the terminal.

The station has been named "Grand Central Terminal" since before its completion in 1913; the full title is inscribed on its 42nd Street facade. According to 21st-century sources, it is designated a "terminal" because trains originate and terminate there. The CSX Corporation Railroad Dictionary also considers "terminals" as facilities "for the breaking up, making up, forwarding, and servicing of trains" or "where one or more rail yards exist".

== Services ==
=== Commuter rail ===
Grand Central Terminal serves some 67 million passengers a year, more than any other Metro-North station. During morning rush hour, a train arrives at the terminal every 58 seconds.

Three of Metro-North's five main lines terminate at Grand Central:

Commuter rail services
Line	Branch	Destination	Notes
Harlem Line		Wassaic, New York	
Hudson Line		Poughkeepsie, New York	Amtrak connection to Albany
New Haven Line	Main Line	New Haven, Connecticut	Amtrak connection to Hartford, Springfield, Boston; Hartford Line to Hartford, Springfield; Shore Line East to New London
New Haven Line	New Canaan Branch	New Canaan, Connecticut	
New Haven Line	Danbury Branch	Danbury, Connecticut	
New Haven Line	Waterbury Branch	Waterbury, Connecticut	

Through these lines, the terminal serves Metro-North commuters traveling to and from the Bronx in New York City; Westchester, Putnam, and Dutchess counties in New York; and Fairfield and New Haven counties in Connecticut.

=== Connecting services ===
==== Long Island Rail Road ====
The MTA's Long Island Rail Road operates commuter trains to the Grand Central Madison station beneath Grand Central, completed in 2023 in the East Side Access project. The project connects the terminal to all of the railroad's branches via its Main Line, linking Grand Central Madison to almost every LIRR station. Partial service to Jamaica began on January 25, 2023.

==== Local services ====
The New York City Subway's adjacent Grand Central–42nd Street station serves the following routes:

Subway services
Routes	Line	Location
4, 5, 6, and <6> trains	IRT Lexington Avenue Line	Diagonally under the Pershing Square Building, 110 East 42nd Street, 42nd Street, and Grand Hyatt New York
7 and <7> trains	IRT Flushing Line	Under 42nd Street between Park Avenue and west of Third Avenue
S train	42nd Street Shuttle	Under 42nd Street between Madison Avenue and Vanderbilt Avenue

These MTA Regional Bus Operations buses stop near Grand Central:

Bus services
Operator	Routes	Type	Location
NYCT Bus	M1, M2, M3, M4, Q32	Local	Madison Avenue (northbound); Fifth Avenue (southbound)
NYCT Bus	SIM23 and SIM24	Express	Madison Avenue (northbound); Fifth Avenue (southbound)
NYCT Bus	X27, X28, X37, X38, SIM4C, SIM6, SIM8, SIM8X, SIM11, SIM22, SIM25, SIM26, SIM30, SIM31, SIM33C, QM63, QM64, QM68	Express	Madison Avenue (northbound)
NYCT Bus	X27, X28, X37, X38, SIM4C, SIM8, SIM8X, SIM25, SIM31, SIM33C	Express	Fifth Avenue (southbound)
NYCT Bus	M42	Local	42nd Street
NYCT Bus	M101, M102, M103	Local	Third Avenue (northbound); Lexington Avenue (southbound)
NYCT Bus	X27, X28	Express	Third Avenue (northbound)
NYCT Bus	SIM6, SIM11, SIM22, SIM26	Express	Lexington Avenue (southbound)
MTA Bus	BxM3, BxM4, BxM6, BxM7, BxM8, BxM9, BxM10, BxM11, BxM18, BM1, BM2, BM3, BM4, BM5, QM21	Express	Madison Avenue (northbound)
MTA Bus	BxM3, BxM4, BxM6, BxM7, BxM8, BxM9, BxM10, BxM11, BxM18, BM1, BM2, BM3, BM4, BM5	Express	Fifth Avenue (southbound)
MTA Bus	BxM1	Express	Lexington Avenue (southbound)
MTA Bus	BxM1, QM31, QM32, QM34, QM35, QM36, QM40, QM42, QM44	Express	Third Avenue (northbound)

=== Former services ===
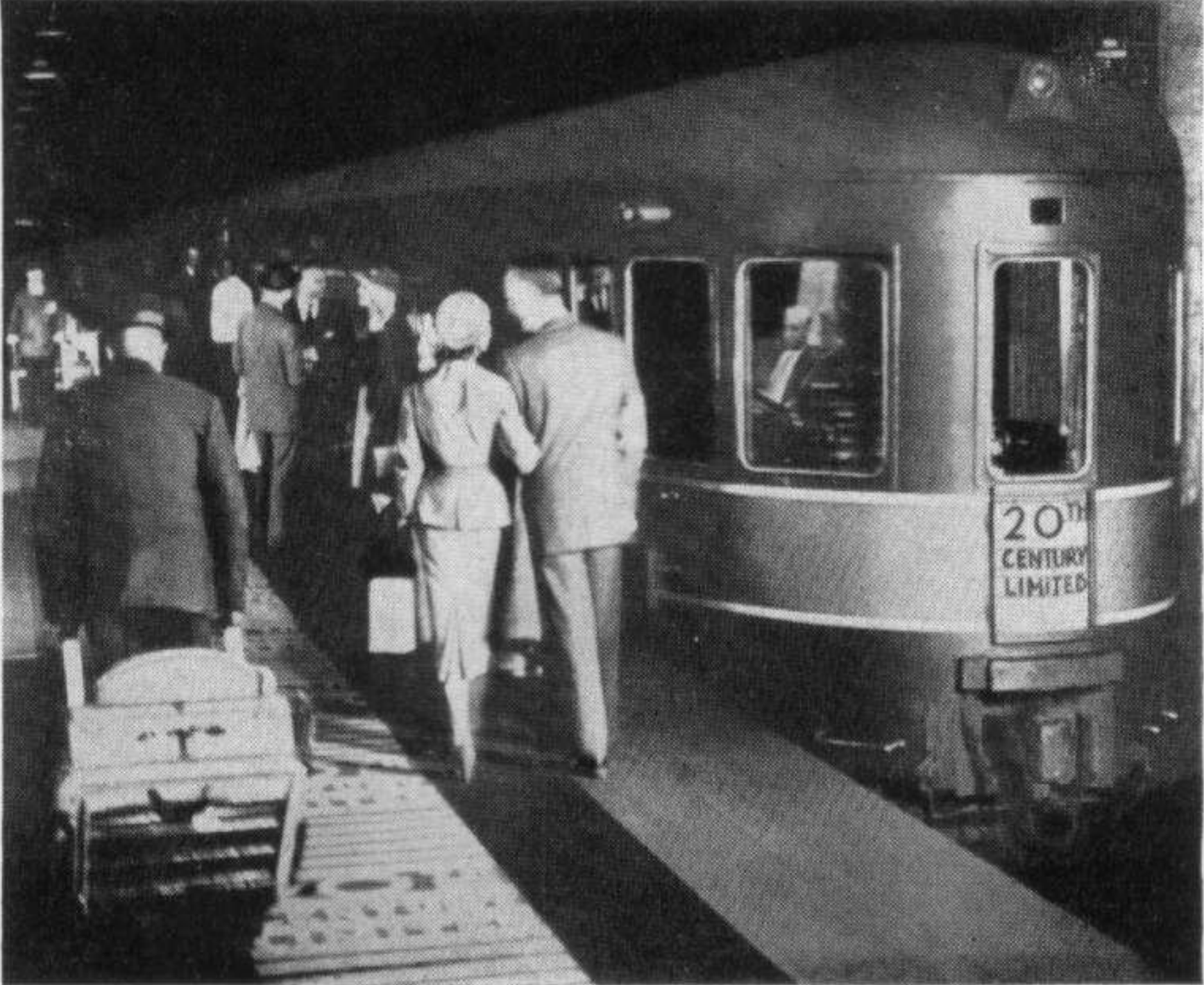
The 20th Century Limited at Grand Central Terminal, c. 1952

The terminal and its predecessors were designed for intercity service, which operated from the first station building's completion in 1871 until Amtrak ceased operations in the terminal in 1991. Through transfers, passengers could connect to all major lines in the United States, including the Canadian, the Empire Builder, the San Francisco Zephyr, the Southwest Limited, the Crescent, and the Sunset Limited under Amtrak. Destinations included San Francisco, Los Angeles, Vancouver, New Orleans, Chicago, and Montreal. Another notable former train was New York Central's 20th Century Limited, a luxury service that operated to Chicago's LaSalle Street Station between 1902 and 1967 and was among the most famous trains of its time.

From 1971 to 1991, all Amtrak trains using the Empire Corridor terminated at Grand Central, while Northeast Corridor trains stopped at Penn Station instead. Notable Amtrak services at Grand Central included the Lake Shore, Empire Service, Adirondack, Niagara Rainbow, Maple Leaf, and Empire State Express.

== Interior ==
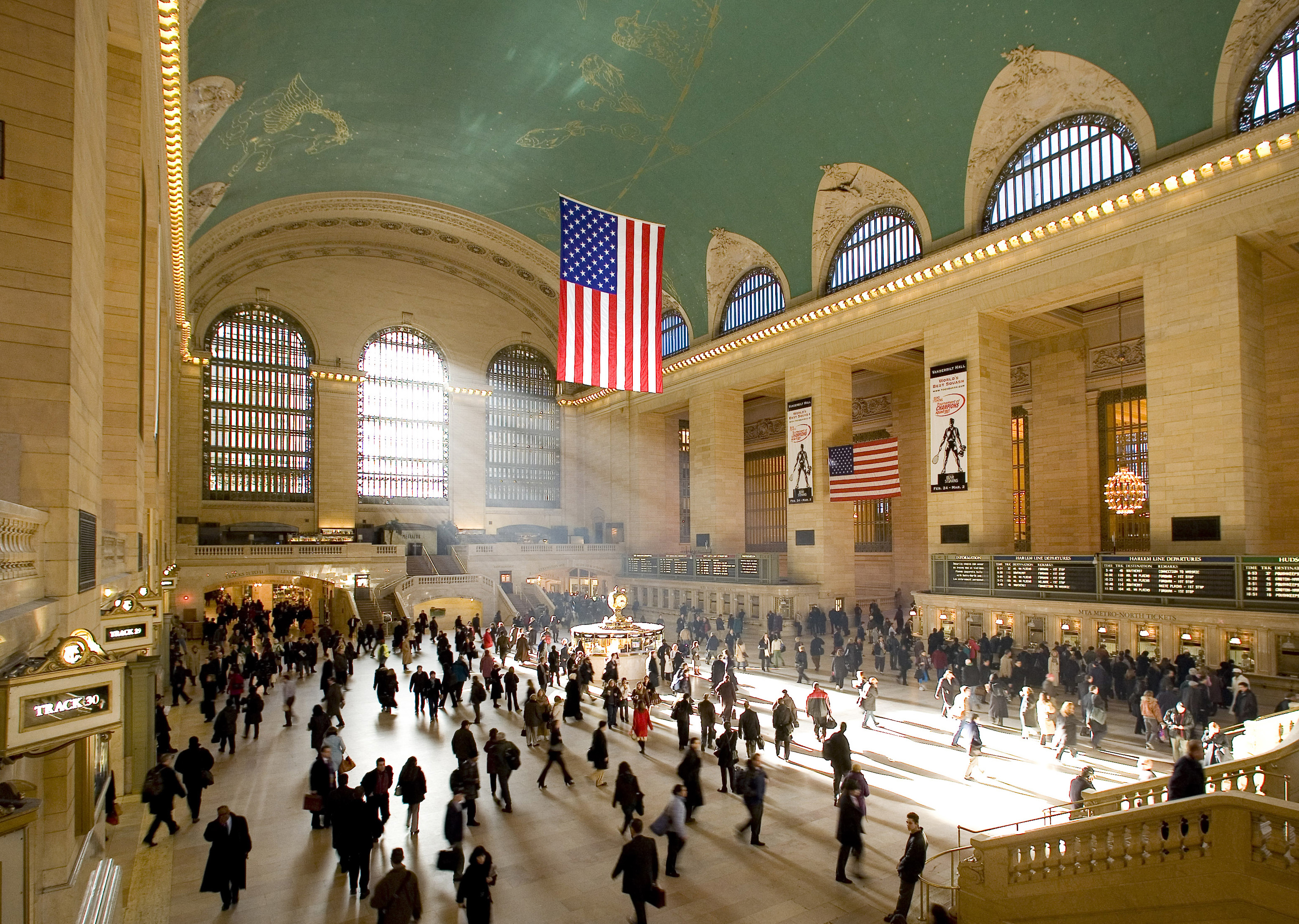
Morning pedestrian traffic in the Main Concourse

Grand Central Terminal was designed and built with two main levels for passengers: an upper for intercity trains and a lower for commuter trains. This configuration, devised by New York Central vice president William J. Wilgus, separated intercity and commuter-rail passengers, smoothing the flow of people in and through the station. The original plan for Grand Central's interior was designed by Reed and Stem, with some work by Whitney Warren of Warren and Wetmore.

=== Main Concourse ===
The Main Concourse is located on the upper platform level of Grand Central, in the geographical center of the station building. The 35,000-square-foot (3,300 m^{2}) concourse leads directly to most of the terminal's upper-level tracks, although some are accessed from passageways near the concourse. The Main Concourse is usually filled with bustling crowds and is often used as a meeting place. At the center of the concourse is an information booth topped with a four-sided brass clock, one of Grand Central's most recognizable icons. The terminal's main departure boards are located at the south end of the space. The boards have been replaced numerous times since their initial installation in 1967.

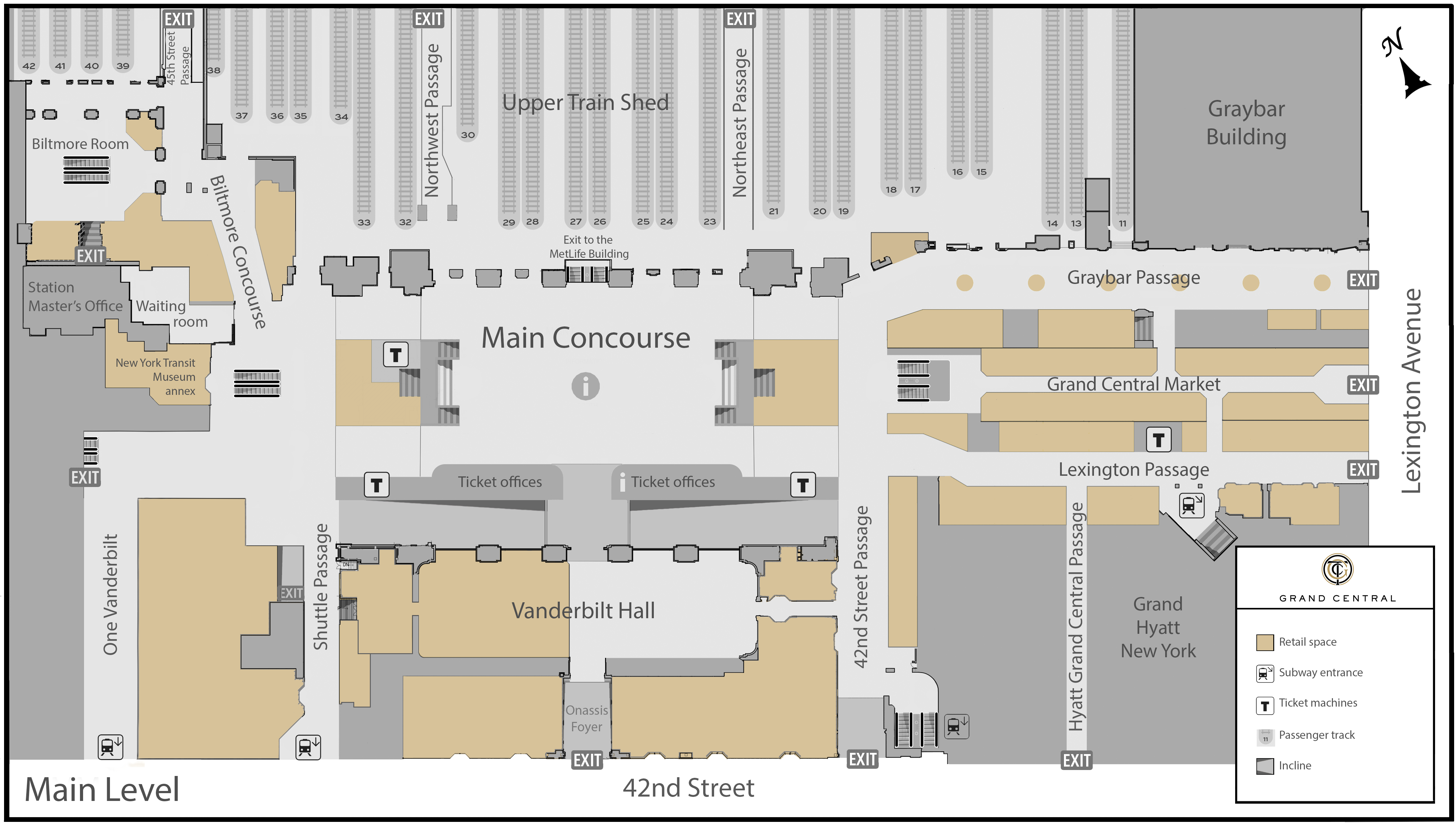
Floor plan of the main level of the terminal

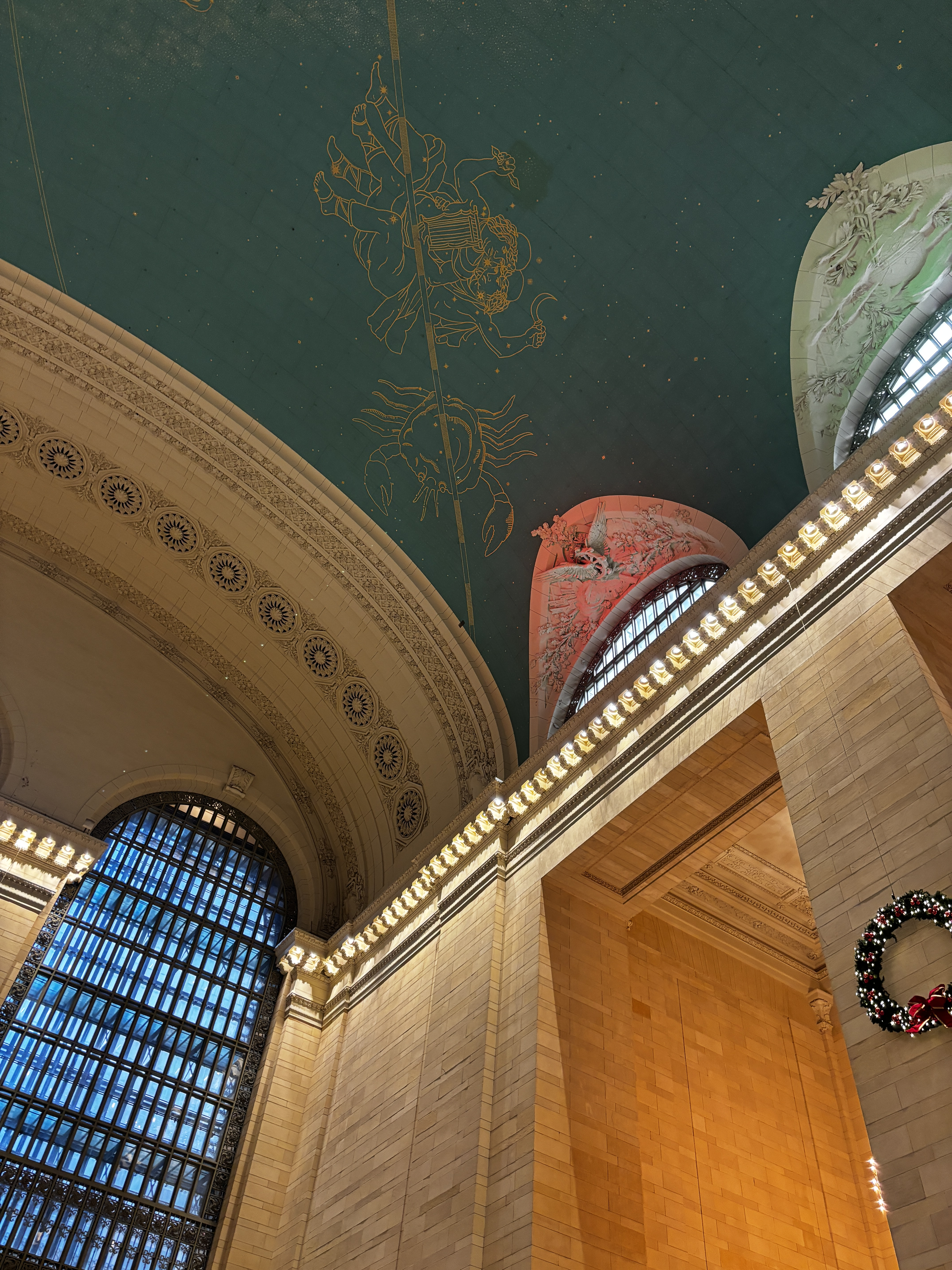
A single black brick was left behind during 1998 renovations as a reminder of the effects of indoor smoking.

=== Passageways and ramps ===
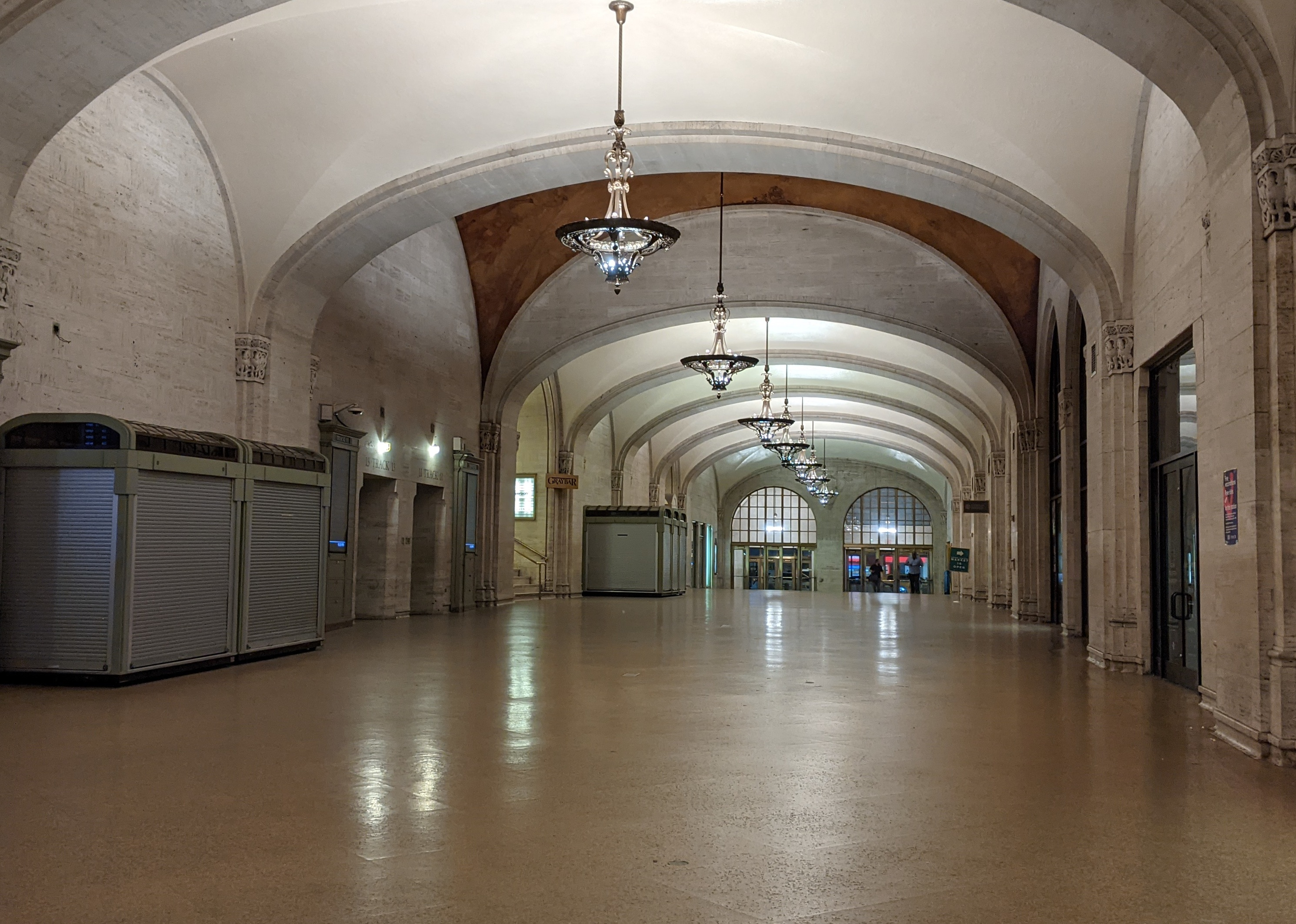
The Graybar Passage

In their design for the station's interior, Reed & Stem created a circulation system that allowed passengers alighting from trains to enter the Main Concourse, then leave through various passages that branch from it. Among these are the north–south 42nd Street Passage and Shuttle Passage, which run south to 42nd Street; and three east–west passageways—the Grand Central Market, the Graybar Passage, and the Lexington Passage—that run about 240 feet (73 m) east to Lexington Avenue by 43rd Street. Several passages run north of the terminal, including the north–south 45th Street Passage, which leads to 45th Street and Madison Avenue, and the network of tunnels in Grand Central North, which lead to exits at every street from 45th to 48th Street.

Each of the east–west passageways runs through a different building. The northernmost is the Graybar Passage, built on the first floor of the Graybar Building in 1926. Its walls and seven large transverse arches are made of coursed ashlar travertine, and the floor is terrazzo. The ceiling is composed of seven groin vaults, each of which has an ornamental bronze chandelier. The first two vaults, as viewed from leaving Grand Central, are painted with cumulus clouds, while the third contains a 1927 mural by Edward Trumbull depicting American transportation.

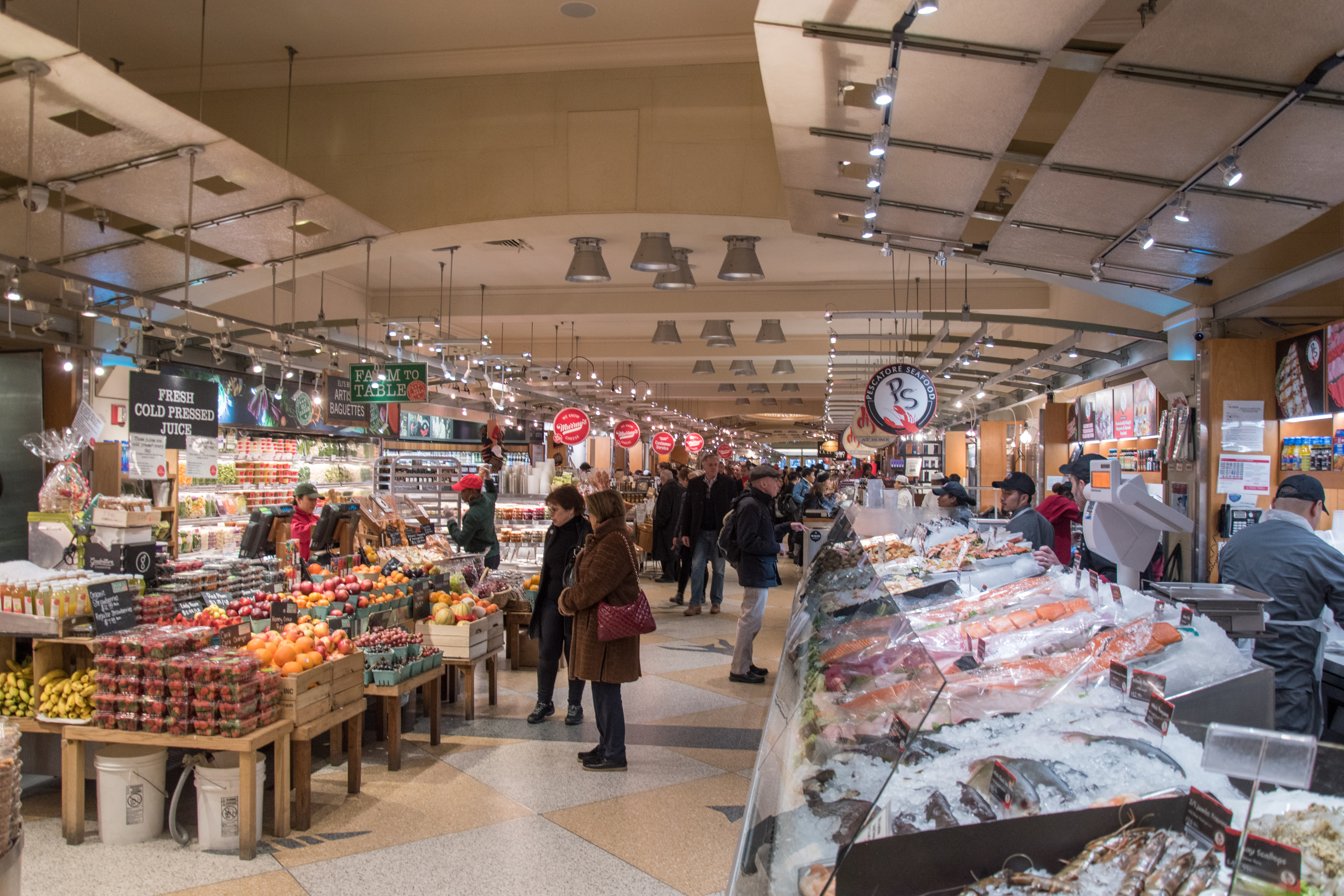
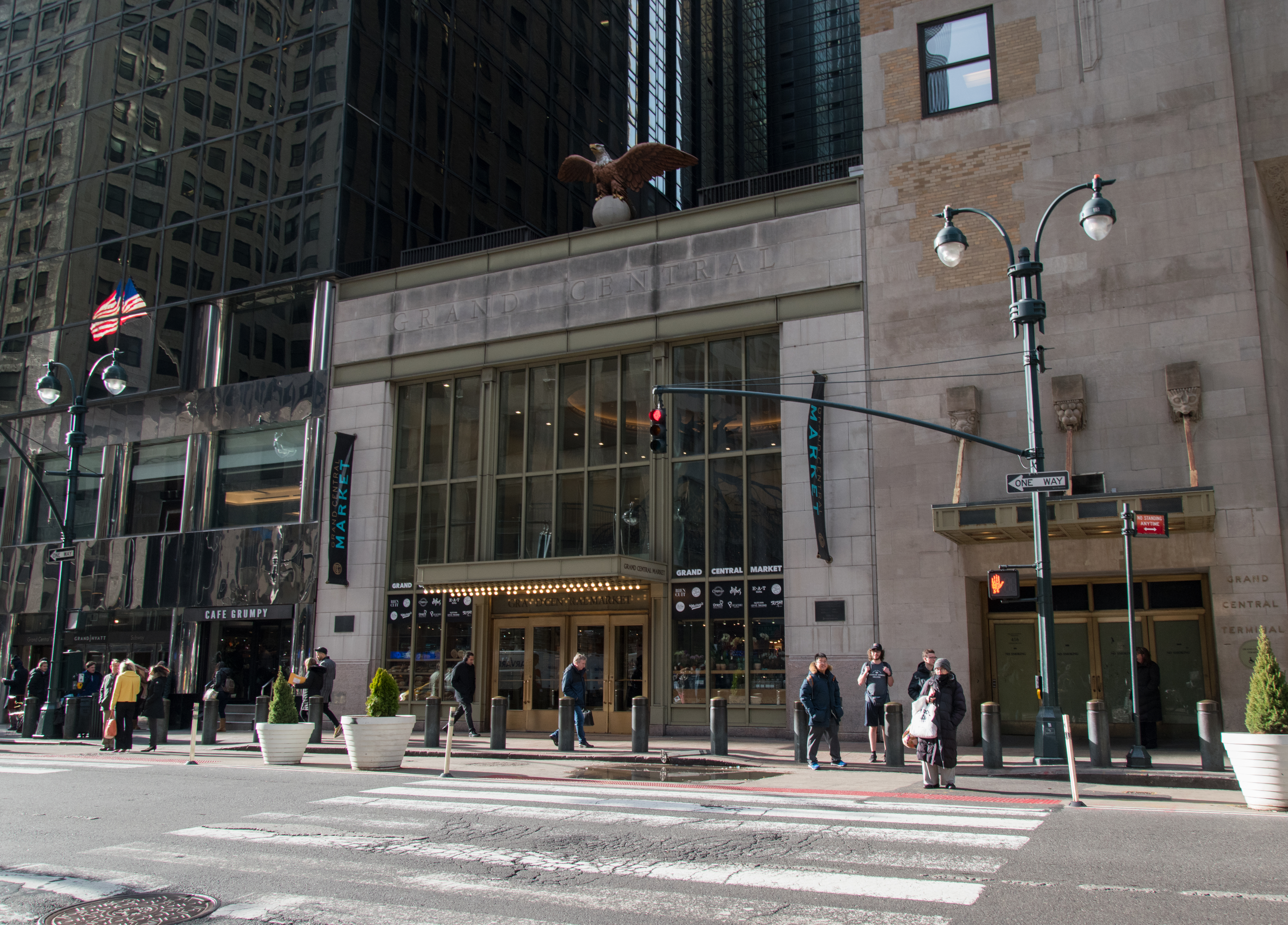
Grand Central Market's interior and its Lexington Avenue facade between the Grand Hyatt New York and Graybar Building

The middle passageway houses Grand Central Market, a cluster of food shops. The site was originally a segment of 43rd Street which became the terminal's first service dock in 1913. In 1975, a Greenwich Savings Bank branch was built in the space, which was converted into the marketplace in 1998, and involved installing a new limestone façade on the building. The building's second story, whose balcony overlooks the market and 43rd Street, was to house a restaurant, but is instead used for storage.

The southernmost of the three, the Lexington Passage, was originally known as the Commodore Passage after the Commodore Hotel, which it ran through. When the hotel was renamed the Grand Hyatt, the passage was likewise renamed. The passage acquired its current name during the terminal's renovation in the 1990s.

The Shuttle Passage, on the west side of the terminal, connects the Main Concourse to Grand Central's subway station. The terminal was originally configured with two parallel passages, later simplified into one wide passageway.

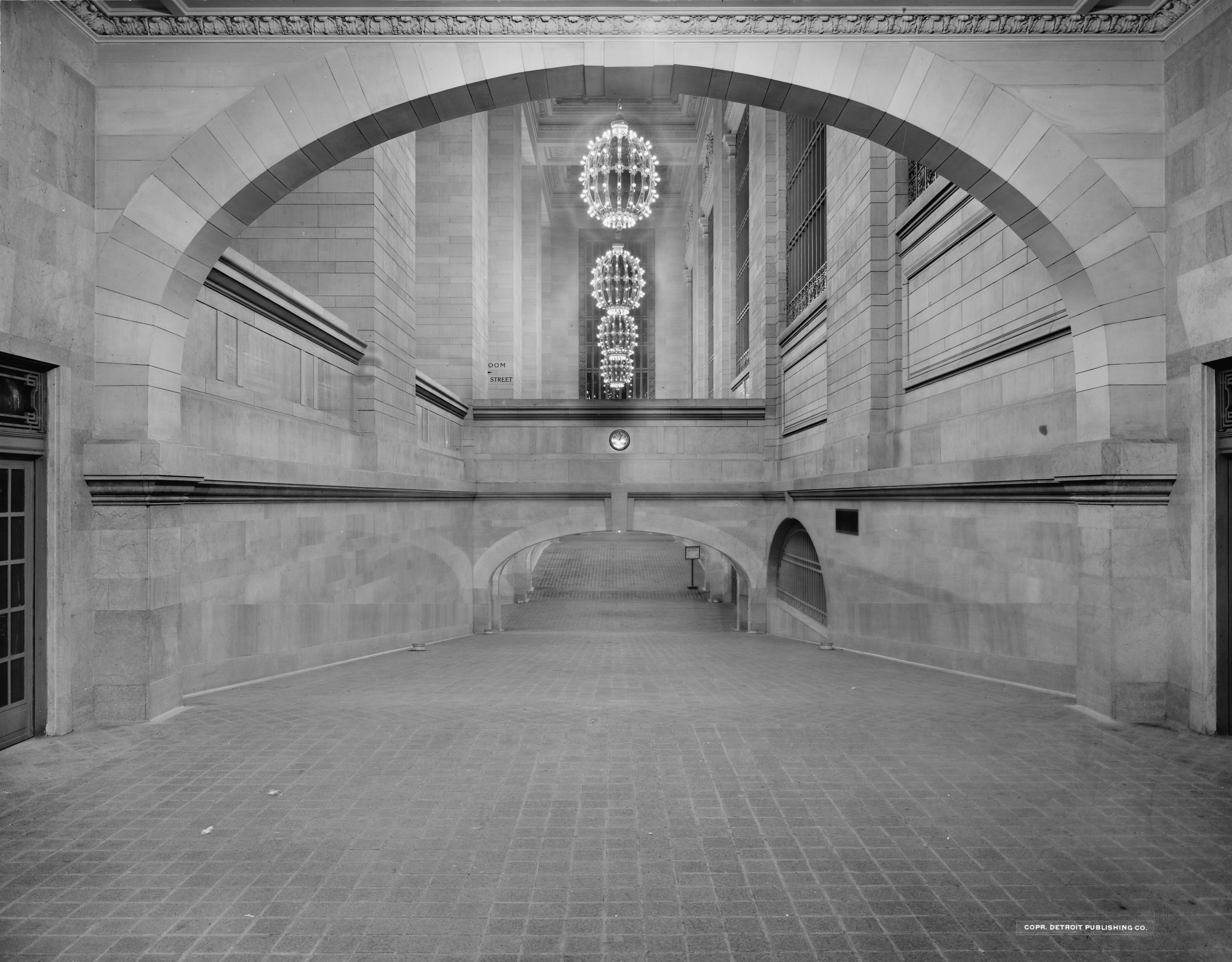
The Oyster Bar ramps shown c. 1913. They were completely restored in 1998 with one change – lower walls on the pedestrian overpass.

Ramps include the Vanderbilt Avenue ramp and the Oyster Bar ramps. The Vanderbilt Avenue or Kitty Kelly ramp leads from the corner of Vanderbilt Avenue and 42nd Street down into the Shuttle Passage. Most of the space above the ramp was built upon in the 20th century, becoming the Kitty Kelly women's shoe store, and later operating as Federal Express. The ramp was returned to its original two-story volume during the terminal's 1998 restoration.

The Oyster Bar ramps lead down from the Main Concourse to the Oyster Bar and Dining Concourse. They span a total of 302 ft (92 m) from east to west under an 84 ft (26 m) ceiling. A pedestrian bridge passes over the ramps, connecting Vanderbilt Hall and the Main Concourse. In 1927, the ramps were partially covered over by expanded main-floor ticket offices; these were removed in the 1998 renovation, which restored the ramps' original appearance with one minor change: the bridge now has a low balustrade, replacing an eight-foot-high solid wall that blocked views between the two levels. The underside of the bridge is covered with Guastavino tiling. The bridge's arches create a whispering gallery in the landing beneath it: a person standing in one corner can hear another speaking softly in the diagonally opposite corner.

==== Grand Central North ====
Interactive map: Grand Central North tunnels and entrances ■ Northwest Passage ■ Northeast Passage ■ 45th Street Cross-Passage ■ 47th Street Cross-Passage ■ Headhouse and train shed

Grand Central North is a network of four tunnels that allow people to walk between the station building (which sits between 42nd and 44th Street) and exits at 45th, 46th, 47th, and 48th Street. The 1,000-foot (300 m) Northwest Passage and 1,200-foot (370 m) Northeast Passage run parallel to the tracks on the upper level, while two shorter cross-passages run perpendicular to the tracks. The 47th Street cross-passage runs between the upper and lower tracks, 30 feet (9.1 m) below street level; it provides access to upper-level tracks. The 45th Street cross-passage runs under the lower tracks, 50 feet (15 m) below street level. Converted from a corridor built to transport luggage and mail, it provides access to lower-level tracks. The cross-passages are connected to the platforms via 37 stairs, six elevators, and five escalators.

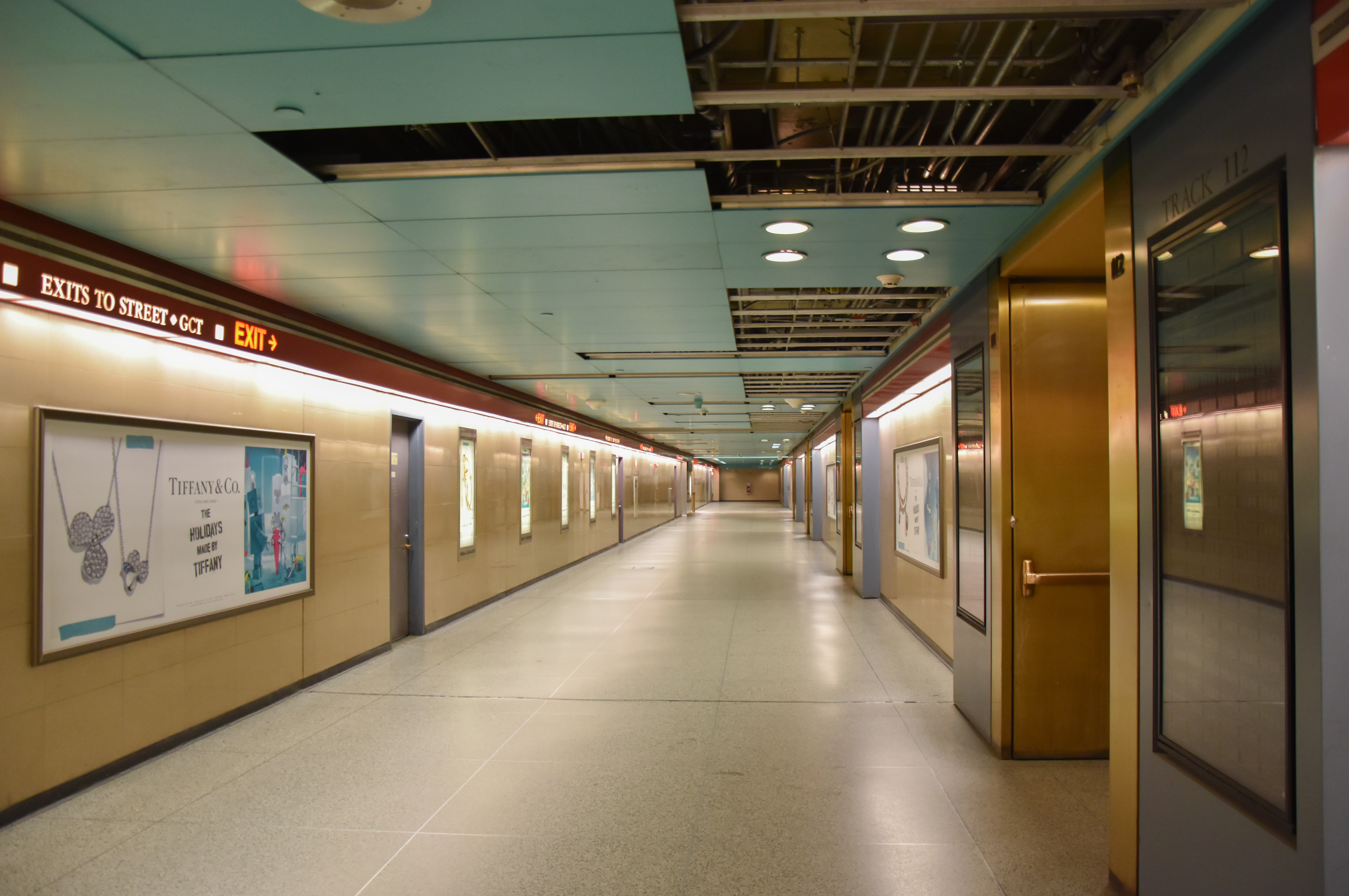
45th Street cross-passage

The tunnels' street-level entrances, each enclosed by a freestanding glass structure, sit at the northeast corner of East 47th Street and Madison Avenue (Northwest Passage), the northeast corner of East 48th Street and Park Avenue (Northeast Passage), in the two pedestrian walkways underneath the Helmsley Building between 45th and 46th streets, and (since 2012) on the south side of 47th Street between Park and Lexington avenues. Pedestrians can also take an elevator to the 47th Street passage from the north side of East 47th Street, between Madison and Vanderbilt avenues; this entrance adjoined the former 270 Park Avenue.

Proposals for these tunnels had been discussed since at least the 1970s. The MTA approved preliminary plans in 1983, gave final approval in 1991, and began construction in 1994. Dubbed the North End Access Project, the work was to be completed in 1997 at a cost of $64.5 million, but it was slowed by the incomplete nature of the building's original blueprints and by previously undiscovered groundwater beneath East 45th Street. During construction, MTA Arts & Design mosaics were installed; each work was part of As Above, So Below, by Brooklyn artist Ellen Driscoll. The passageways opened on August 18, 1999, at a final cost of $75 million.

In spring 2000, construction began on a project to enclose the Northeast and Northwest passages with ceilings and walls. Work on each passage was expected to take 7.5 months, with the entire project wrapping up by summer 2001. As part of the project, the walls of the passages were covered with glazed terrazzo; the Northeast Passage's walls have blue-green accents while the Northwest Passage's walls have red ones. The ceilings are 8 to 10 feet (2.4 to 3.0 m) high; the cross-passages' ceilings are blue-green, the same color as the Main Concourse, and have recessed lights arranged to resemble the Main Concourse's constellations. The passages were to be heated in winter and ventilated. Originally, Grand Central North had no restrooms or air-conditioning.

The entrances to Grand Central North were originally open from 6:30 a.m. to 9:30 p.m. Monday through Friday. During weekends and holidays, the 47th and 48th Street entrances were open from 9:00 a.m. to 9:30 p.m., while the two entrances to the Helmsley Building were closed. Five years after they opened, the passageways were used by about 30,000 people on a typical weekday. But they served only about 6,000 people on a typical weekend, so the MTA proposed to close them on weekends to save money as part of the 2005–2008 Financial Plan. Since summer 2006, Grand Central North has been closed on weekends.

As a precaution during the COVID-19 pandemic, Grand Central North closed on March 26, 2020. It reopened in September of that year with hours from 6:30 to 10 a.m. and 4 to 7 p.m. In 2021, its original hours were restored. On November 1, 2021, the entrance to the northeastern corner of Madison Avenue and 47th Street was "closed long-term to accommodate the construction of 270 Park Avenue". After Grand Central Madison begins full service, Grand Central North will be open from 5:30 a.m. until 2 a.m., seven days a week.

=== Other spaces on the main floor ===
==== Jacqueline Kennedy Onassis Foyer ====
The main entrance into the terminal, underneath the Park Avenue Viaduct, opens into the Jacqueline Kennedy Onassis Foyer. The room is a short passage with a sloped floor and arched shop windows along its side walls. It is adorned with glass and bronze chandeliers, a classical cornice, and a decorative tympanum above the doors leading to Vanderbilt Hall. The tympanum has sculpted bronze garlands and a caduceus below an inscripted panel that reads: "To all those with head, heart, and hand • Toiled in the construction of this monument to the public service • This is inscribed." Above the panel is a clock framed by a pair of carved cornucopias. In 2014, the foyer was named for Onassis, former First Lady of the United States, who in the 1970s helped ward off the demolition of the Main Concourse and the construction of Grand Central Tower.

==== Vanderbilt Hall ====
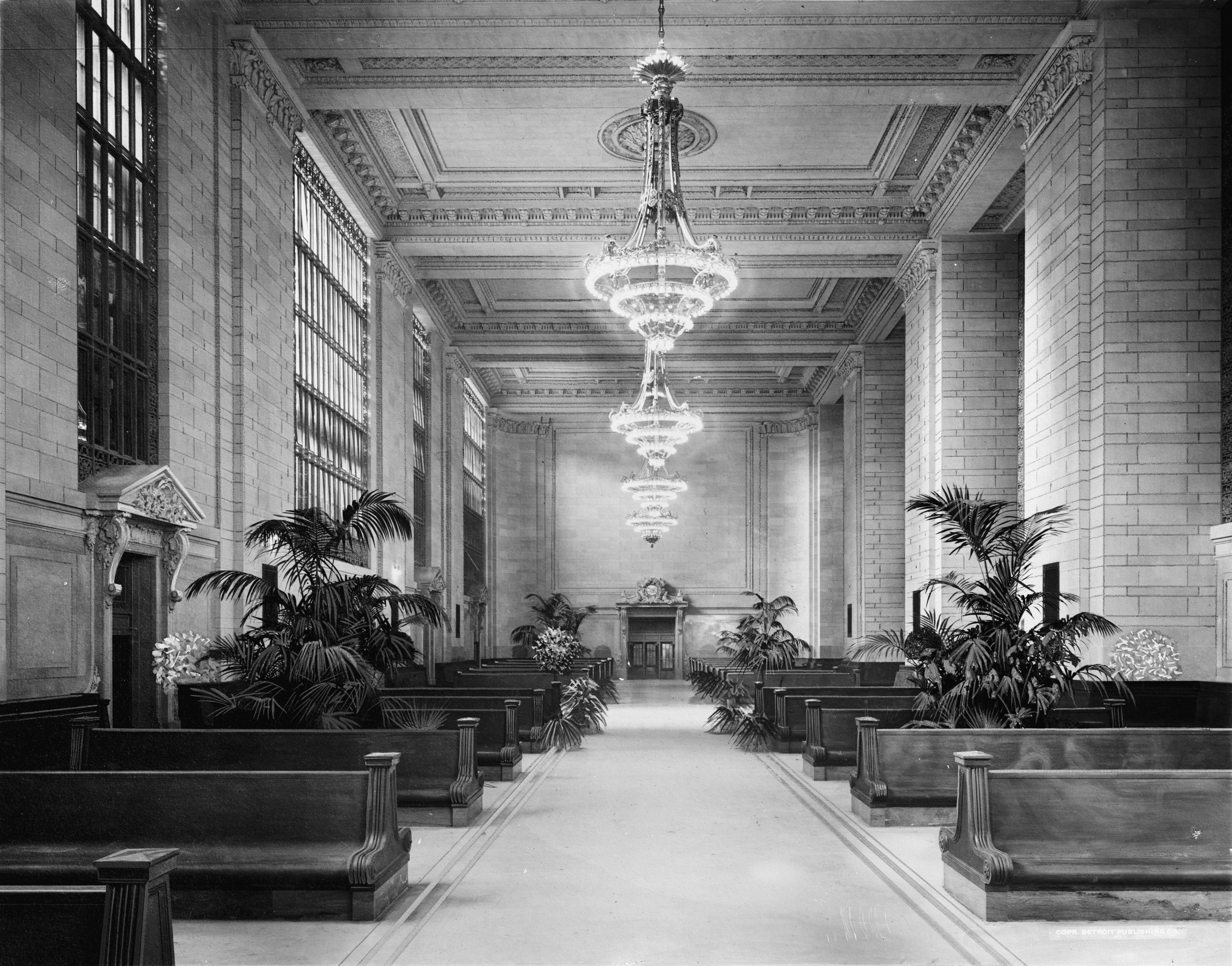
Vanderbilt Hall, c. 1913

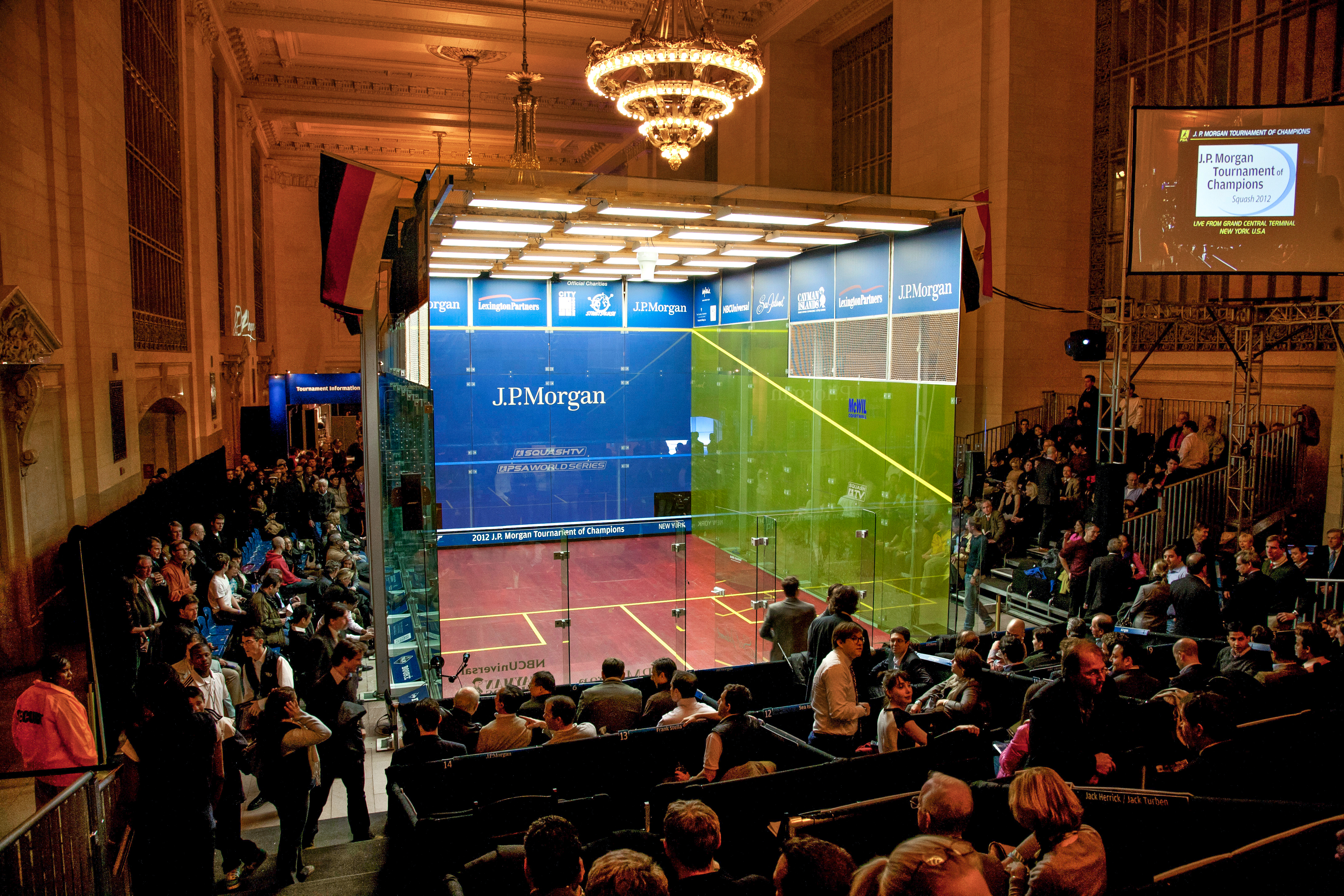
The Tournament of Champions squash championship in 2012

Vanderbilt Hall is an event space on the south side of the terminal, between the main entrance and the Main Concourse to its north. The rectangular room measures 65 by 205 feet (20 m × 62 m). The north and south walls are divided into five bays, each with large rectangular windows, screened with heavy bronze grills. The room is lit by Beaux-Arts chandeliers, each with 132 bulbs on four tiers. Vanderbilt Hall was formerly the main waiting room for the terminal, used particularly by intercity travelers. The space featured double-sided oak benches and could seat 700 people. As long-distance passenger service waned, the space became favored by the homeless, who began regularly living there in the 1980s. In 1989, the room was boarded up in preparation for its restoration in 1991. During the process, a temporary waiting room was established on an upper level of the terminal. (Note: Several of the hall's benches were moved to a smaller waiting room in the Station Master's Office. In 2018, two of the benches were sent on a long-term loan to Springfield, Massachusetts's Union Station.)

Around 1998, the renovated hall was renamed in honor of the Vanderbilt family, which built and owned the station. It is used for the annual Christmas Market, as well as for special exhibitions and private events. From 2016 to 2020, the west half of the hall held the Great Northern Food Hall, an upscale Nordic-themed food court with five pavilions. The food hall was the first long-term tenant of the space; the terminal's landmark status prevents permanent installations.

Since 1999, Vanderbilt Hall has hosted the annual Tournament of Champions squash championship. Each January, tournament officials construct a free-standing glass-enclosed 21-by-32-foot (6.4 by 9.8 m) squash court. Like a theatre in the round, spectators sit on three sides of the court.

A men's smoking room and women's waiting room were formerly located on the west and east sides of Vanderbilt Hall, respectively. In 2016, the men's room was renovated into Agern, an 85-seat Nordic-themed fine dining and Michelin-starred restaurant operated by Noma co-founder Claus Meyer, who also ran the food hall. Both venues permanently closed in 2020 during the COVID-19 pandemic. City Winery signed a lease for both the food hall and the Agern space in 2022. The firm opened a wine bar, a quick-service restaurant named City Jams, and a farm-to-table restaurant named Cornelius in these spaces that November.

==== Biltmore Room ====
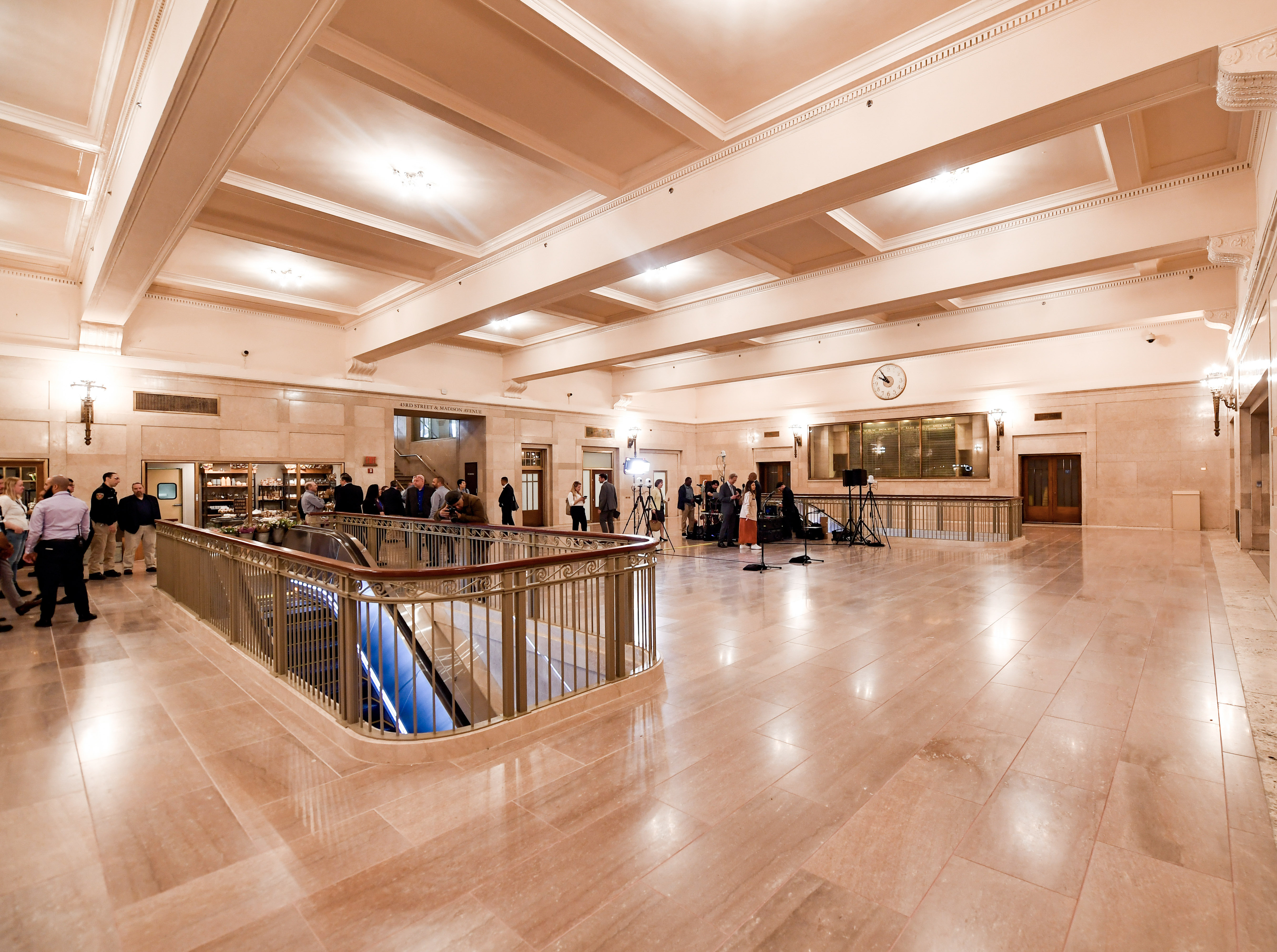
The Biltmore Room at its reopening in 2023

The Biltmore Room, originally known simply as the incoming train room, is a 64-by-80-foot (20 by 24 m) marble hall that serves as an entrance to tracks 39 through 42, and connects to Grand Central Madison. The hall is northwest of the Main Concourse and directly beneath 22 Vanderbilt, the former Biltmore Hotel building. The room was completed in 1915 as a waiting room for intercity trains, which led to its colloquial name of the "Kissing Room", in reference to the greetings that would take place there.

As the station's passenger traffic declined in mid-century, the room fell into neglect. In 1982 and 1983, the room was damaged during the construction that converted the Biltmore Hotel into the Bank of America Plaza. In 1985, Giorgio Cavaglieri was hired to restore the room, which at the time had cracked marble and makeshift lighting. During that era, a series of lockers was still located within the Biltmore Room. Later, the room held a newsstand, flower stand, and shoe shine booths. In 2015, the MTA awarded a contract to refurbish the Biltmore Room into an arrival area for Long Island Rail Road passengers as part of the East Side Access project. As part of the project, the room's booths and stands were replaced by a pair of escalators and an elevator to Grand Central Madison's deep-level concourse, which opened in May 2023.

The room's blackboard displayed the arrival and departure times of New York Central trains until 1967, when a mechanical board was installed in the Main Concourse.

==== Station Master's Office ====
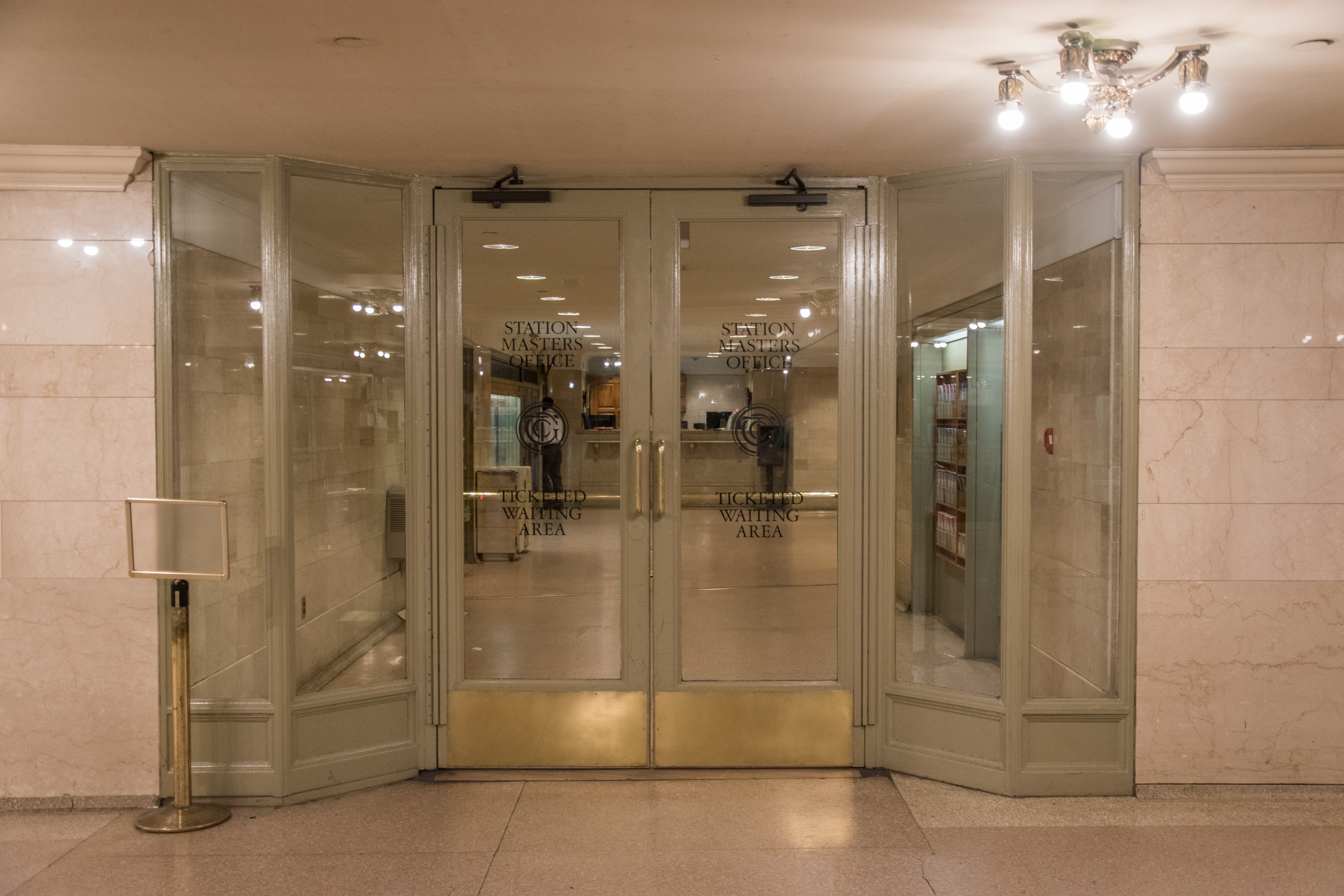
Doorway and front desk

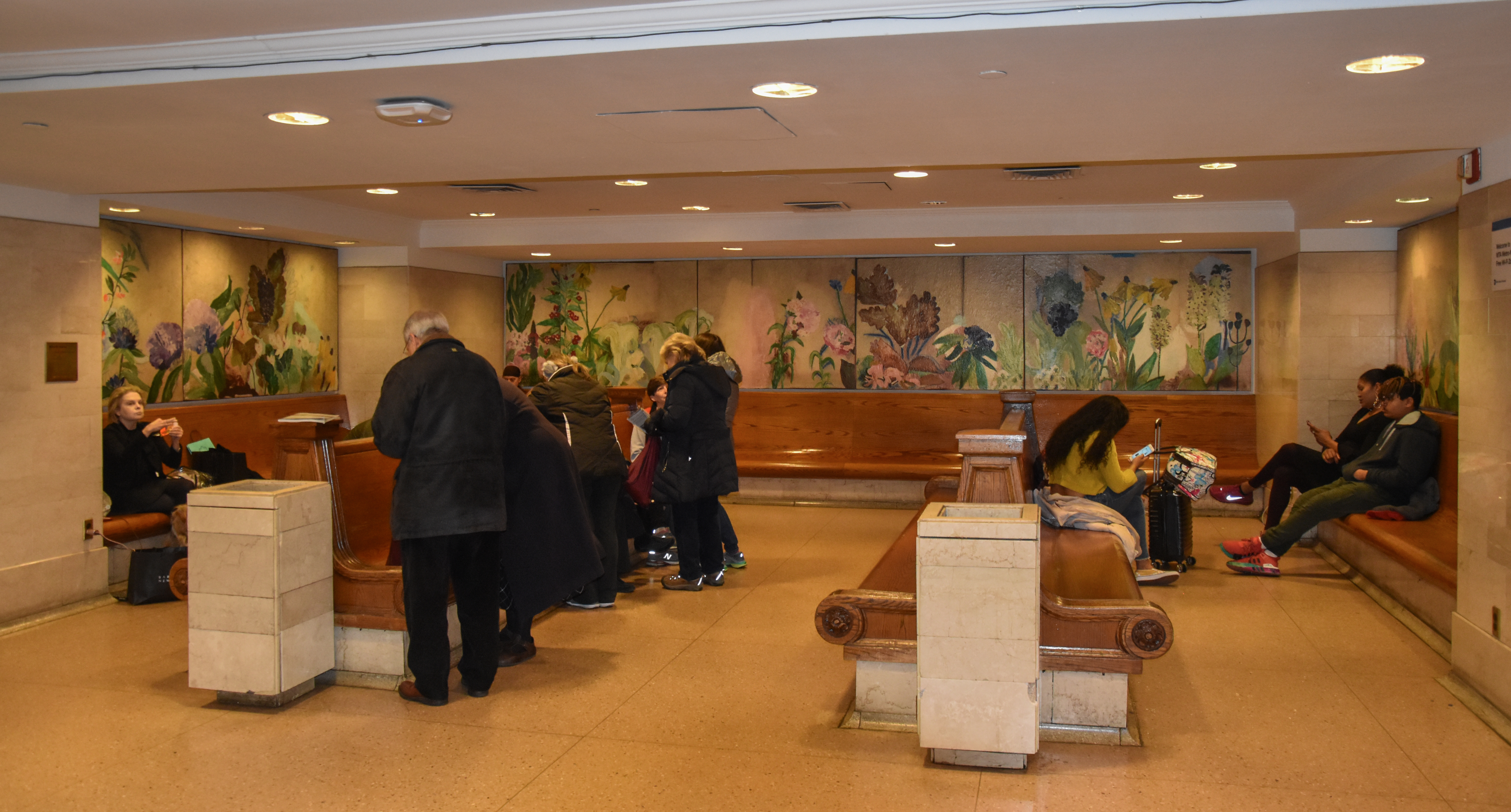
Ticketed waiting area

The Station Master's Office, located near Track 36, has Grand Central's only dedicated waiting room. The space has benches, restrooms, and a floral mixed-media mural on three of its walls. The room's benches were previously located in the former waiting room, now known as Vanderbilt Hall. Since 2008, the area has offered free Wi-Fi.

==== Former theatre ====
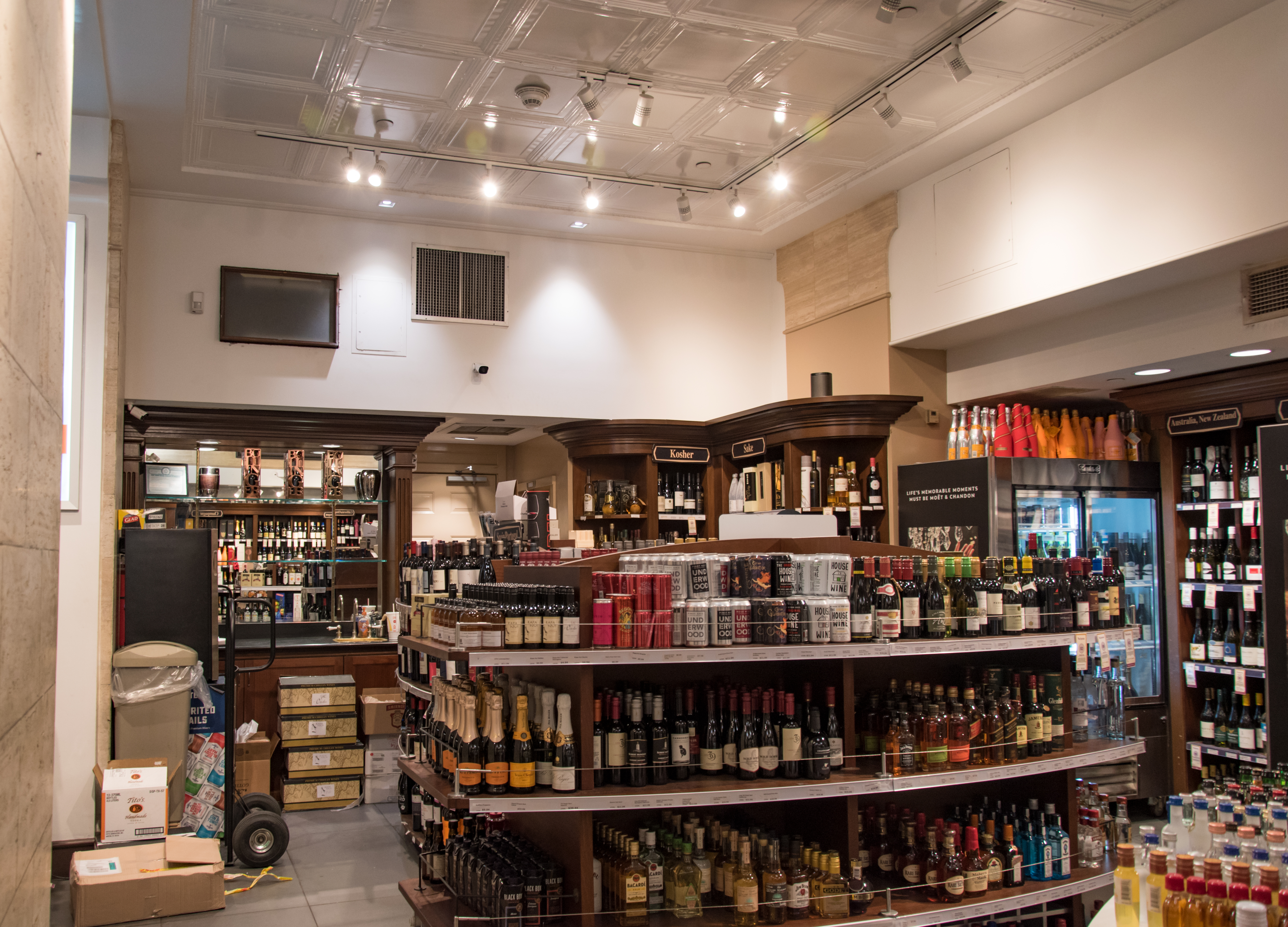
Central Cellars interior; the theater projection window is at the top left

One of the retail areas of the Graybar Passage, currently occupied by wine-and-liquor store Central Cellars, was formerly the Grand Central Theatre or Terminal Newsreel Theatre. Opened in 1937 with 25-cent admission, the theater showed short films, cartoons, and newsreels from 9 a.m. to 11 p.m. Designed by Tony Sarg, it had 242 stadium-style seats and a standing-room section with armchairs. A small bar sat near the entrance. The theater's interior had simple pine walls spaced out to eliminate echos, along with an inglenook, a fireplace, and an illuminated clock for the convenience of travelers. The walls of the lobby, dubbed the "appointment lounge", were covered with world maps; the ceiling had an astronomical mural painted by Sarg. The New York Times reported a cost of $125,000 for the theater's construction, which was attributed to construction of an elevator between the theater and the suburban concourse as well as air conditioning and apparatuses for people hard of hearing.

The theater stopped showing newsreels by 1968 but continued operating until around 1979, when it was gutted for retail space. A renovation in the early 2000s removed a false ceiling, revealing the theater's projection window and its astronomical mural, which proved similar in colors and style to the Main Concourse ceiling.

=== Dining Concourse ===
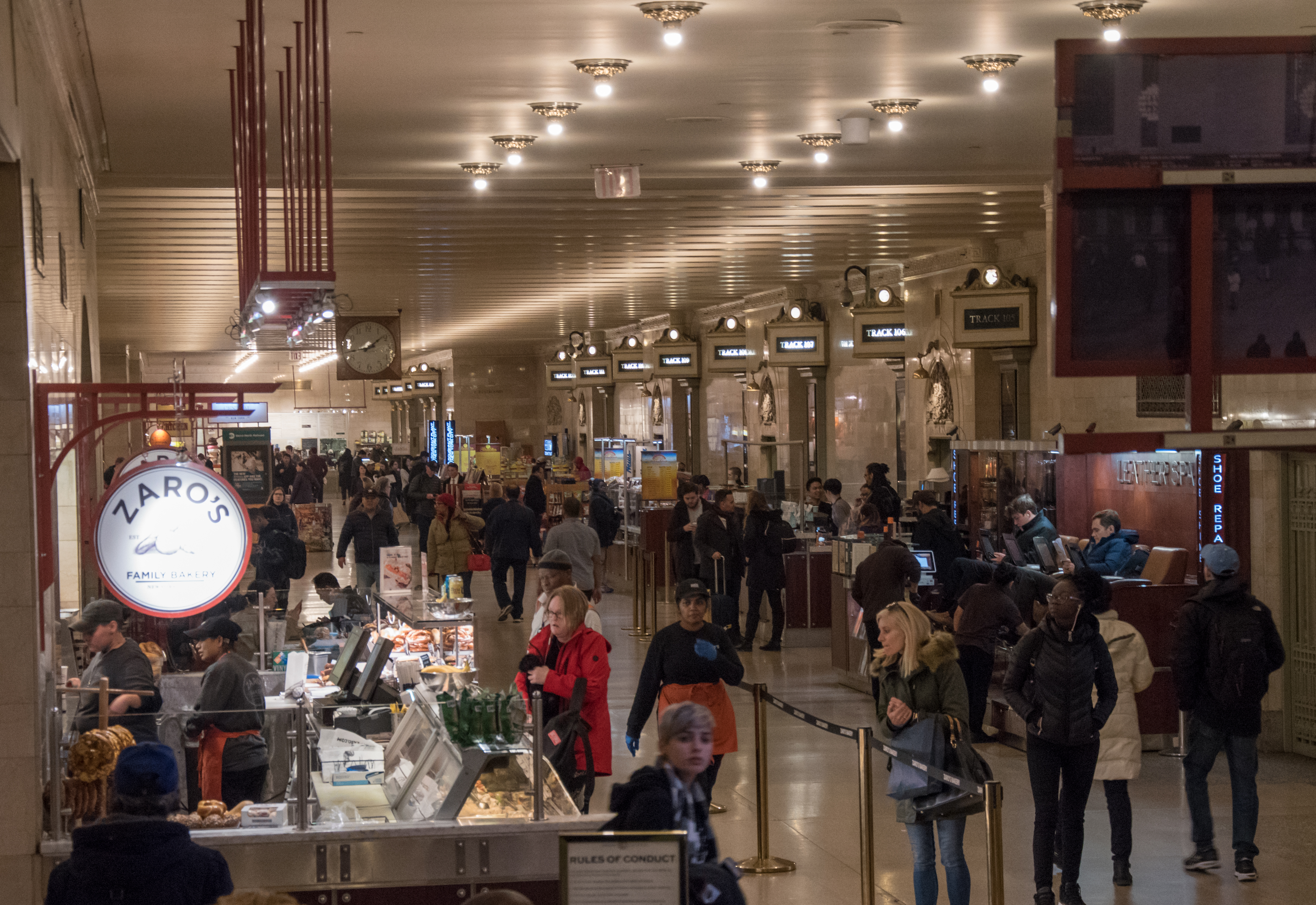
Dining Concourse food stalls and track entrances

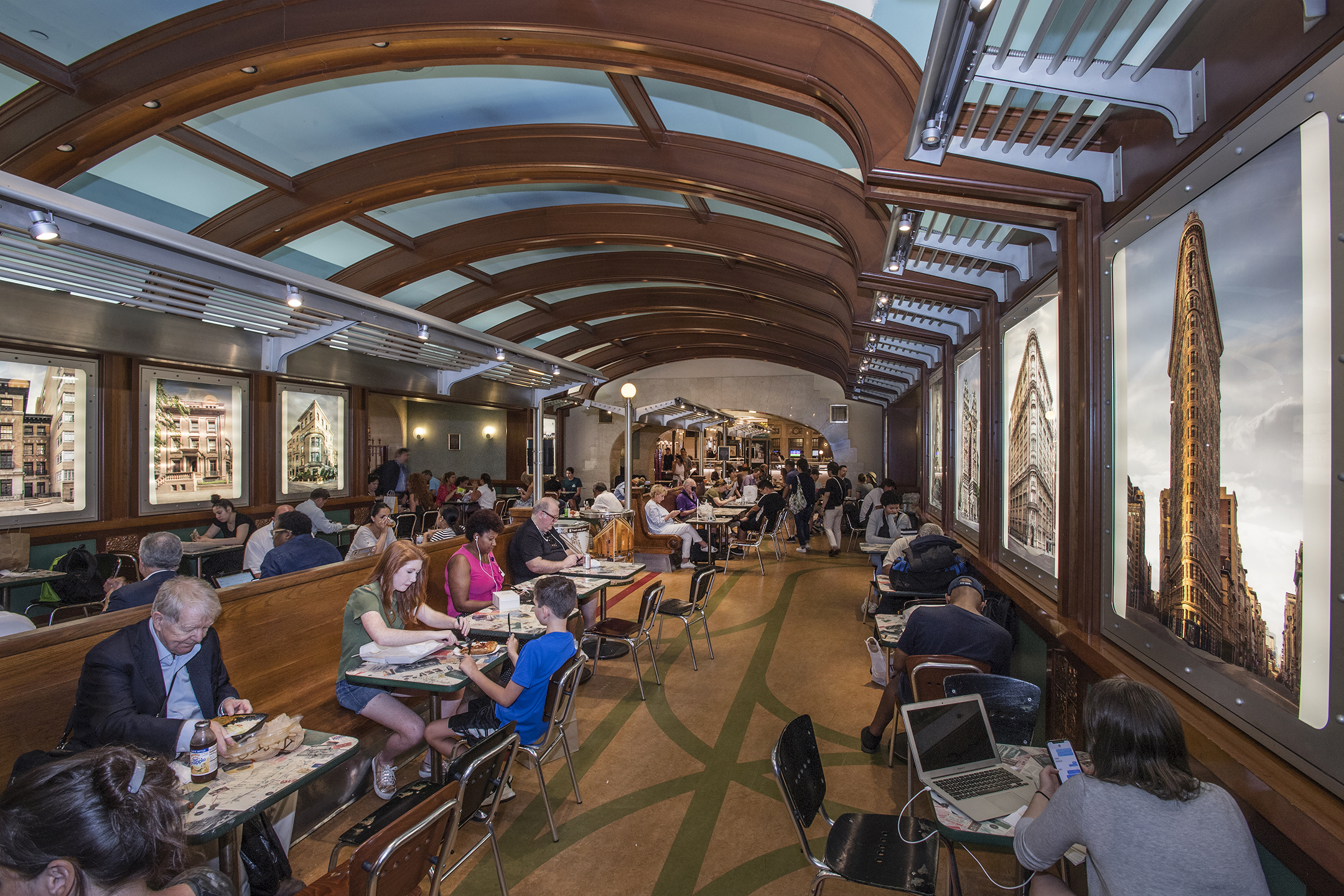
One of several public seating areas

Access to the lower-level tracks is provided by the Dining Concourse, located below the Main Concourse and connected to it by numerous stairs, ramps, and escalators. For decades, it was called the Suburban Concourse because it handled commuter rail trains. Today, it has central seating and lounge areas, surrounded by restaurants and food vendors. The shared public seating in the concourse was designed resembling Pullman traincars. These areas are frequented by the homeless, and as a result, in the mid-2010s the MTA created two areas with private seating for dining customers.

The terminal's late-1990s renovation added stands and restaurants to the concourse, and installed escalators to link it to the main concourse level. The MTA also spent $2.2 million to install two circular terrazzo designs by David Rockwell and Beyer Blinder Belle, each 45 feet in diameter, over the concourse's original terrazzo floor. Since 2015, part of the Dining Concourse has been closed for the construction of stairways and escalators to the new LIRR terminal being built as part of East Side Access.

A small square-framed clock is installed in the ceiling near Tracks 108 and 109. It was manufactured at an unknown time by the Self Winding Clock Company, which made several others in the terminal. The clock hung inside the gate at Track 19 until 2011, when it was moved so it would not be blocked by lights added during upper-level platform improvements.

==== Lost-and-found bureau ====
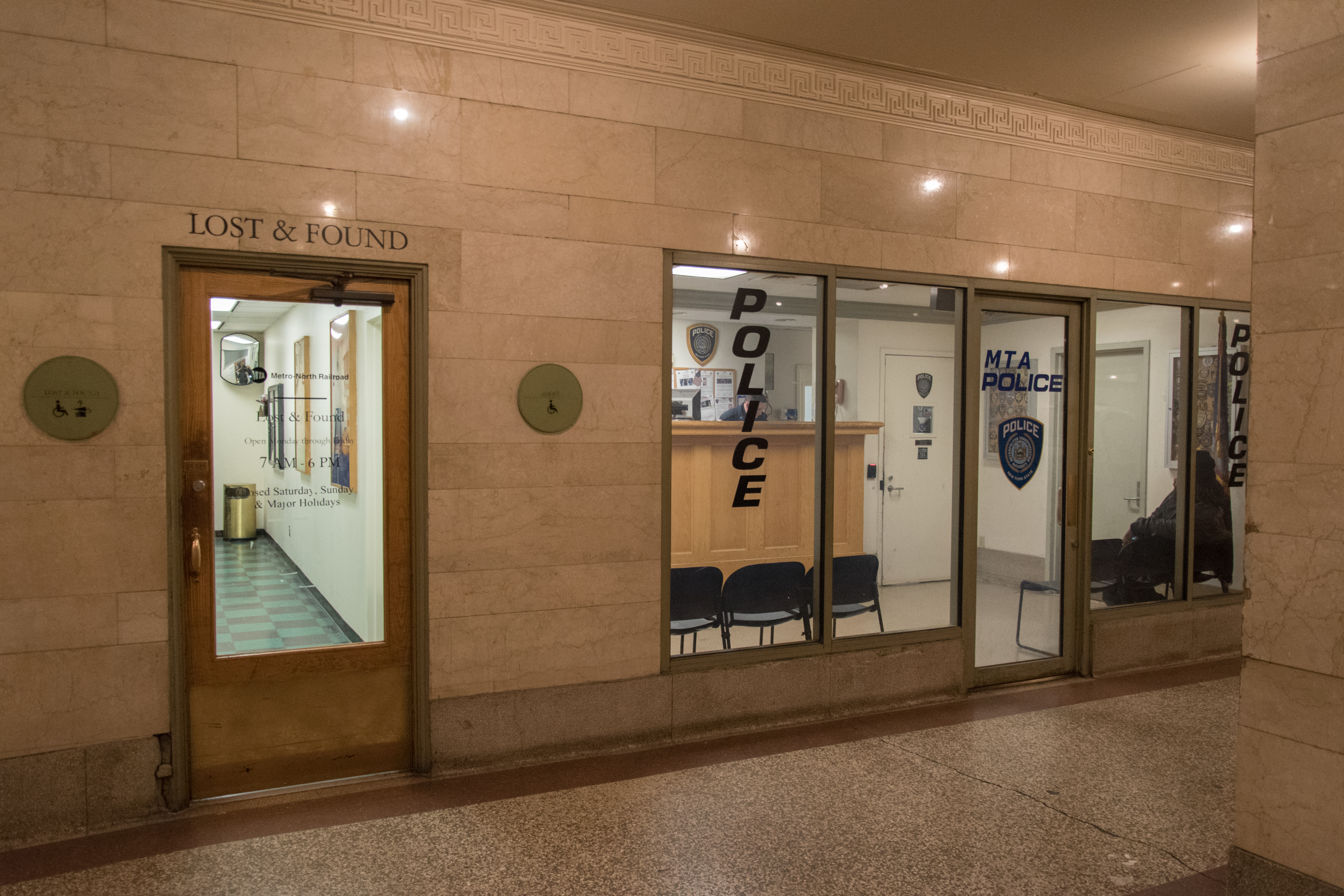
MTA Police and lost-and-found offices

Metro-North's lost-and-found bureau sits near Track 100 at the far east end of the Dining Concourse. Incoming items are sorted according to function and date: for instance, there are separate bins for hats, gloves, belts, and ties. The sorting system was computerized in the 1990s. Lost items are kept for up to 90 days before being donated or auctioned off.

As early as 1920, the bureau received between 15,000 and 18,000 items a year. By 2002, the bureau was collecting "3,000 coats and jackets; 2,500 cellphones; 2,000 sets of keys; 1,500 wallets, purses and ID's [sic]; and 1,100 umbrellas" a year. By 2007, it was collecting 20,000 items a year, 60% of which were eventually claimed. In 2013, the bureau reported an 80% return rate, among the highest in the world for a transit agency.

Some of the more unusual items collected by the bureau include fake teeth, prosthetic body parts, legal documents, diamond pouches, live animals, and a $100,000 violin. One story has it that a woman purposely left her unfaithful husband's ashes on a Metro-North train before collecting them three weeks later. In 1996, some of the lost-and-found items were displayed at an art exhibition.

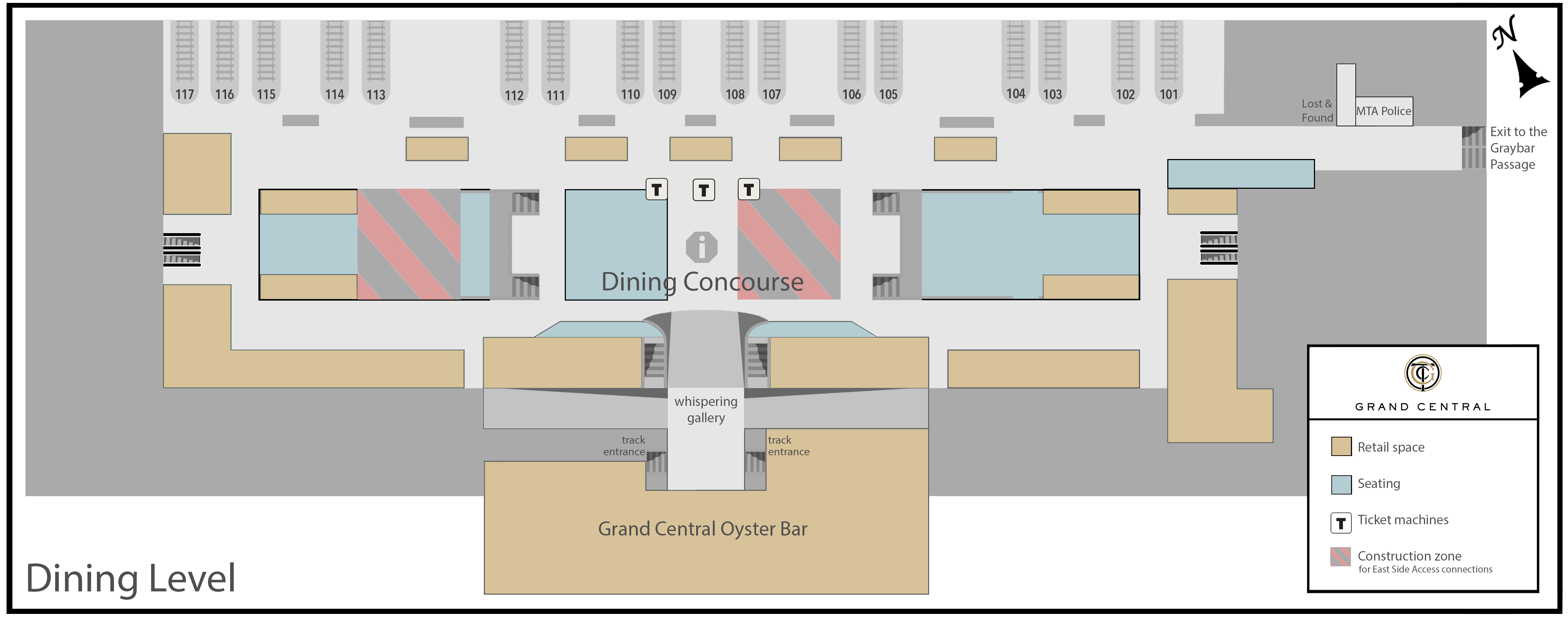
Floor plan of the Dining Level

=== Other food service and retail spaces ===
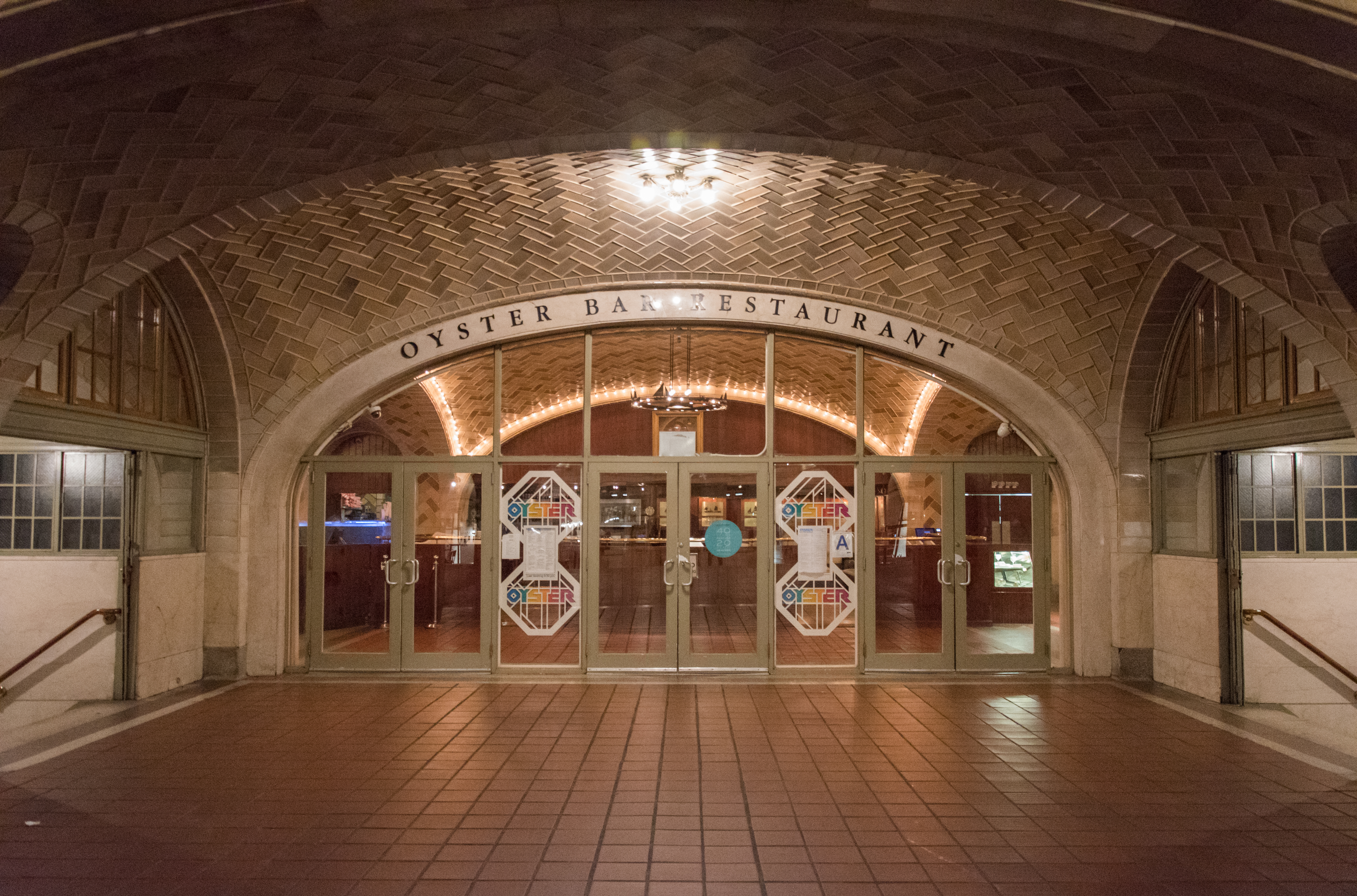
Entrance to the Oyster Bar

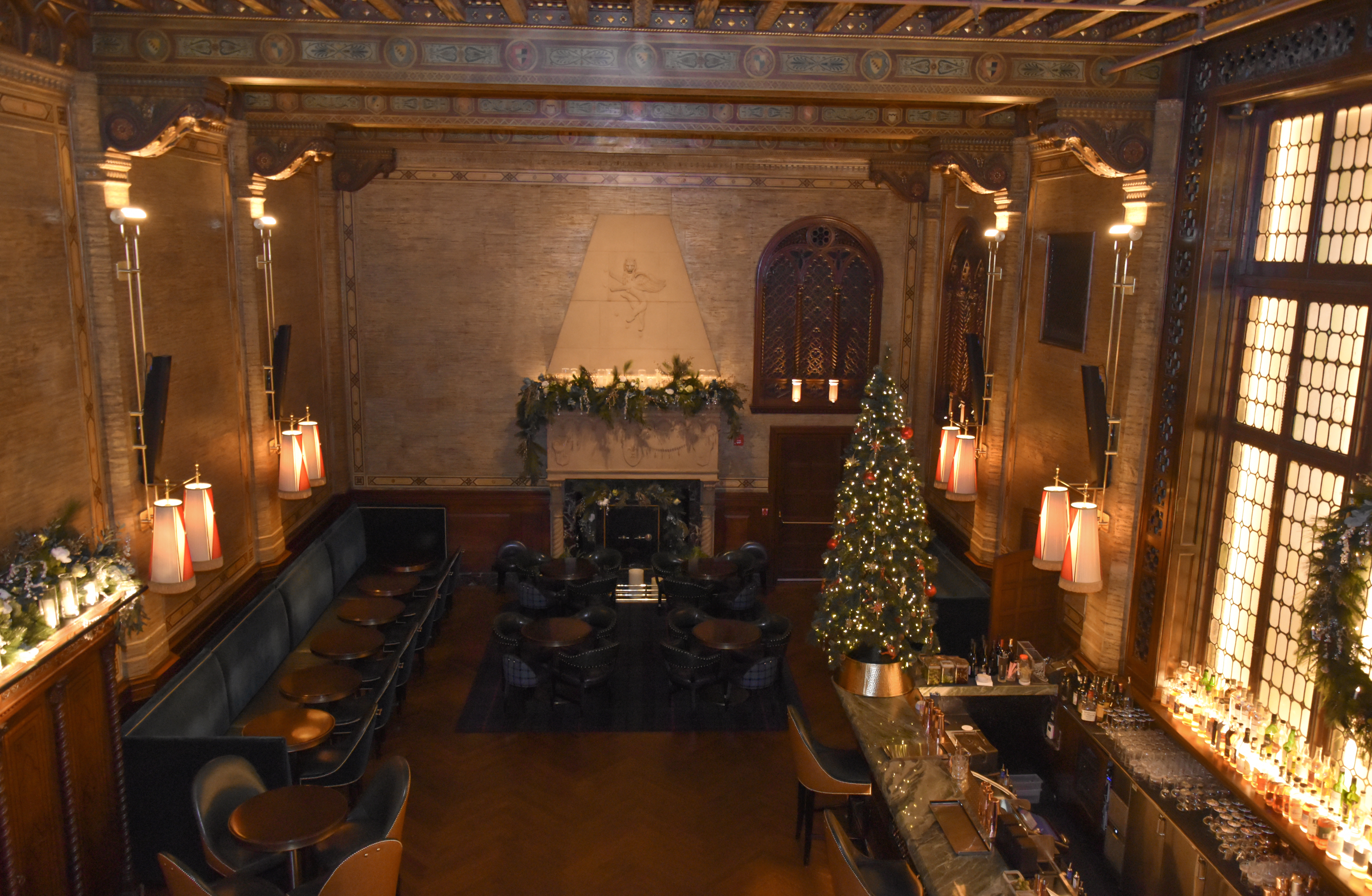
The Campbell Bar

Grand Central Terminal contains restaurants such as the Grand Central Oyster Bar & Restaurant and various fast food outlets surrounding the Dining Concourse. There are also delis, bakeries, a gourmet and fresh food market, and an annex of the New York Transit Museum. The 40-plus retail stores include newsstands and chain stores, including a Starbucks coffee shop, a Rite Aid pharmacy, and an Apple Store. The Oyster Bar, the oldest business in the terminal, sits next to the Dining Concourse and below Vanderbilt Hall.

An elegantly restored cocktail lounge, the Campbell, sits just south of the 43rd Street/Vanderbilt Avenue entrance. A mix of commuters and tourists access it from the street or the balcony level. The space was once the office of 1920s tycoon John W. Campbell, who decorated it to resemble the galleried hall of a 13th-century Florentine palace. In 1999, it opened as a bar, the Campbell Apartment; a new owner renovated and renamed it the Campbell in 2017.

=== Vanderbilt Tennis Club and former studios ===
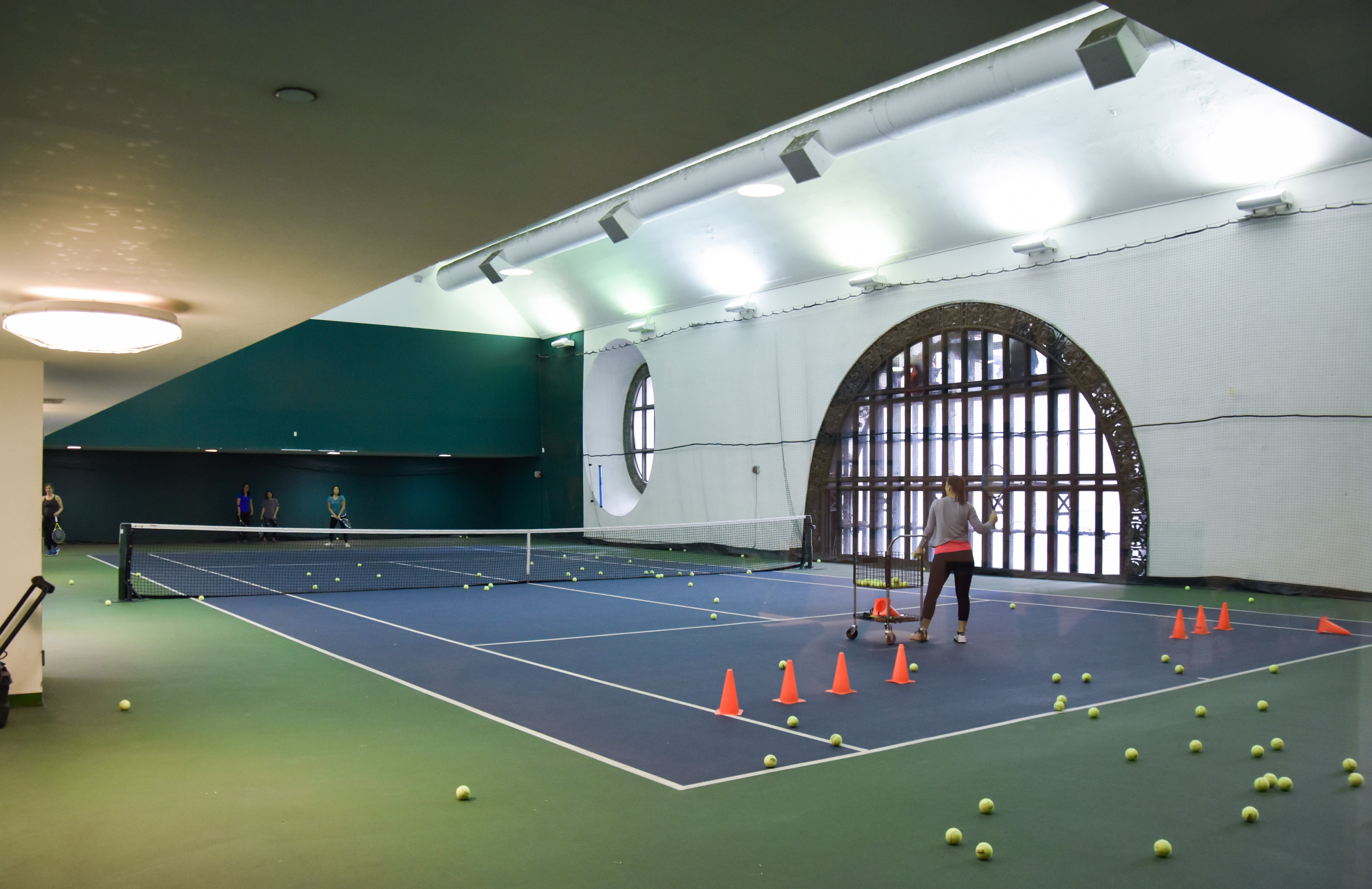
The Vanderbilt Tennis Club's court

From 1939 to 1964, CBS Television occupied a large portion of the terminal building, particularly in a third-floor space above Vanderbilt Hall. The CBS offices, called "The Annex", contained two "program control" facilities (43 and 44); network master control; facilities for local station WCBS-TV; and, after World War II, two production studios (41 and 42). The total space measured 225 ft × 60 ft × 40 ft (69 m × 18 m × 12 m). Broadcasts were transmitted from an antenna atop the nearby Chrysler Building installed by order of CBS chief executive William S. Paley, and were also shown on a large screen in the Main Concourse. In 1958, CBS opened the world's first major videotape operations facility in Grand Central. Located in a former rehearsal room on the seventh floor, the facility used 14 Ampex VR-1000 videotape recorders.

Douglas Edwards with the News broadcast from Grand Central for several years, covering John Glenn's 1962 Mercury-Atlas 6 space flight and other events. Edward R. Murrow's See It Now originated there, including his famous broadcasts on Senator Joseph McCarthy, which were recreated in George Clooney's movie Good Night, and Good Luck, although the film incorrectly implies that CBS News and corporate offices were in the same building. The long-running panel show What's My Line? was first broadcast from Grand Central, as were The Goldbergs and Mama. CBS eventually moved its operations to the CBS Broadcast Center on 57th Street.

In 1966, the vacated studio space was converted into the Vanderbilt Athletic Club, a sports club named for the hall just below. Founded by Geza A. Gazdag, an athlete and Olympic coach who fled Hungary amid its 1956 revolution, its two tennis courts were once deemed the most expensive place to play the game—$58 an hour—until financial recessions forced the club to lower the hourly fee to $40. Club amenities included a 65-by-30-foot (19.8 m × 9.1 m) nylon ski slope, a health club facility and sauna, and spaces for golf, fencing, gymnastics, and ballet practice. Gazdag's business was evicted from Grand Central in 1976, amid a lease dispute. In 1984, the club was purchased by real estate magnate Donald Trump, who discovered it while renovating the terminal's exterior. In 2009, the MTA planned a new conductor lounge in the space, and terminated Trump's lease that year. It divided the space into three floors, with the lounge on the original third floor. A single tennis court was added on the new fourth floor in 2010, along with two practice alleys on the new fifth floor. Trump found the new space too small to release, and so the current Vanderbilt Tennis Club operates independent of Trump.

=== Basement spaces ===
Grand Central Terminal's 48-acre (19 ha) basements are among the largest in the city. Basement spaces include M42, which has AC-to-DC converters to power the track's third rails, as well as Carey's Hole, a former retail storage space and present-day employee lounge and dormitory.

==== Power and heating plants ====
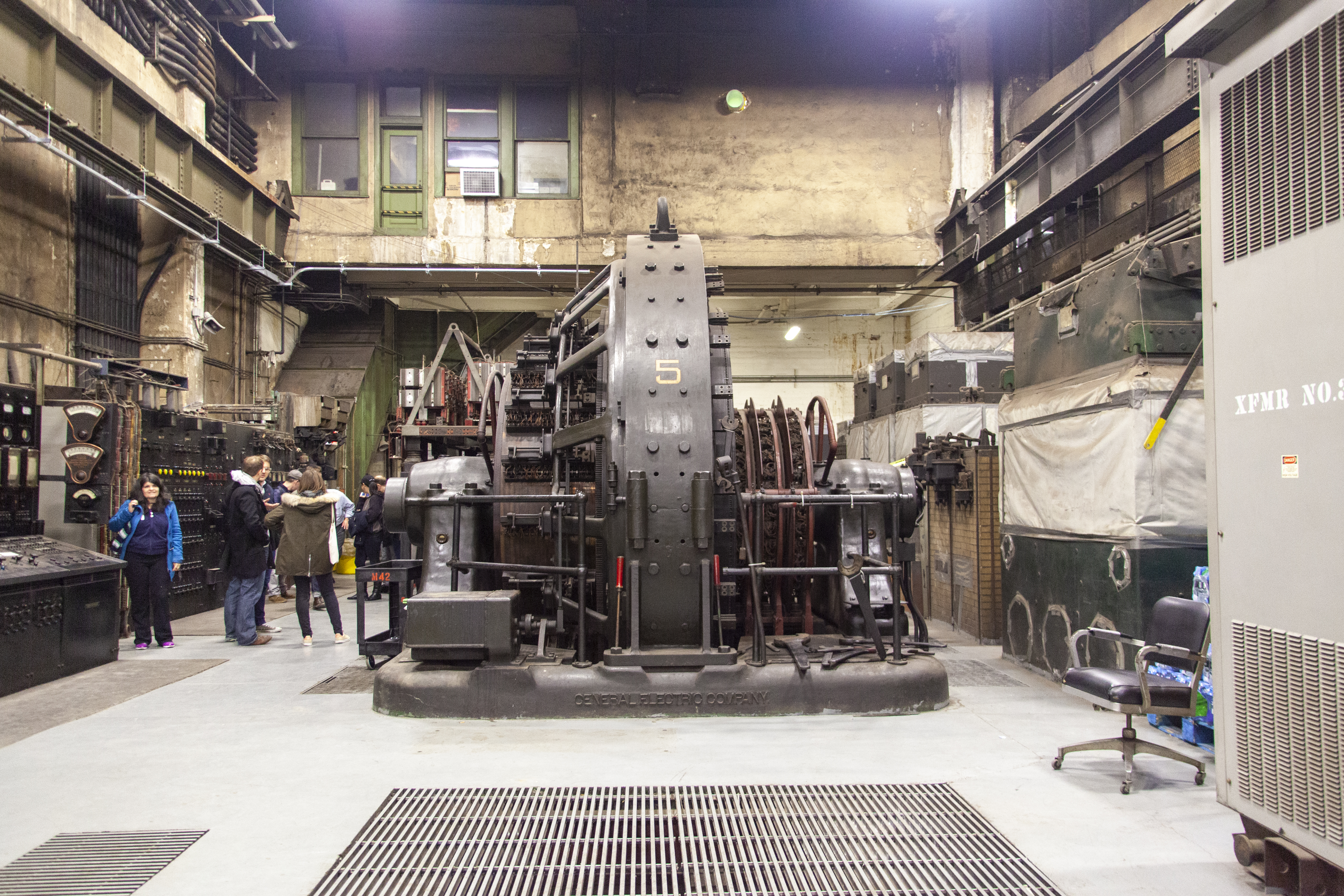
Rotary converter relics in the M42 basement

Grand Central Terminal contains an underground sub-basement known as M42. Its electrical substation is divided into substation 1T, which provides 16,500 kilowatts (22,100 hp) for third-rail power, and substation 1L, which provides 8,000 kilowatts (11,000 hp) for other lighting and power. The substation—the world's largest at the time—was built about 100 feet (30 m) under the Graybar Building at a cost of $3 million, and opened February 16, 1930. It occupies a four-story space with an area of 250 by 50 feet (76 by 15 m).

==== Carey's Hole ====
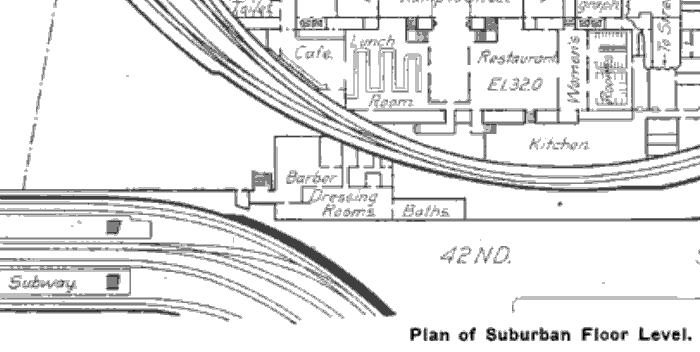
1913 map showing the space beneath Carey's barbershop

Another part of the basement is known as Carey's Hole. The two-story section is directly beneath the Shuttle Passage and adjacent spaces. In 1913, when the terminal opened, J. P. Carey opened a barbershop adjacent to and one level below the terminal's waiting room (now Vanderbilt Hall). Carey's business expanded to include a laundry service, shoe store, and haberdashery. In 1921, Carey also ran a limousine service using Packard cars, and in the 1930s, he added regular car and bus service to the city's airports as they opened. Carey would store his merchandise in an unfinished, underground area of the terminal, which railroad employees and maintenance staff began calling "Carey's Hole". The name has remained even as the space has been used for different purposes, including currently as a lounge and dormitory for railroad employees.

=== Platforms and tracks ===
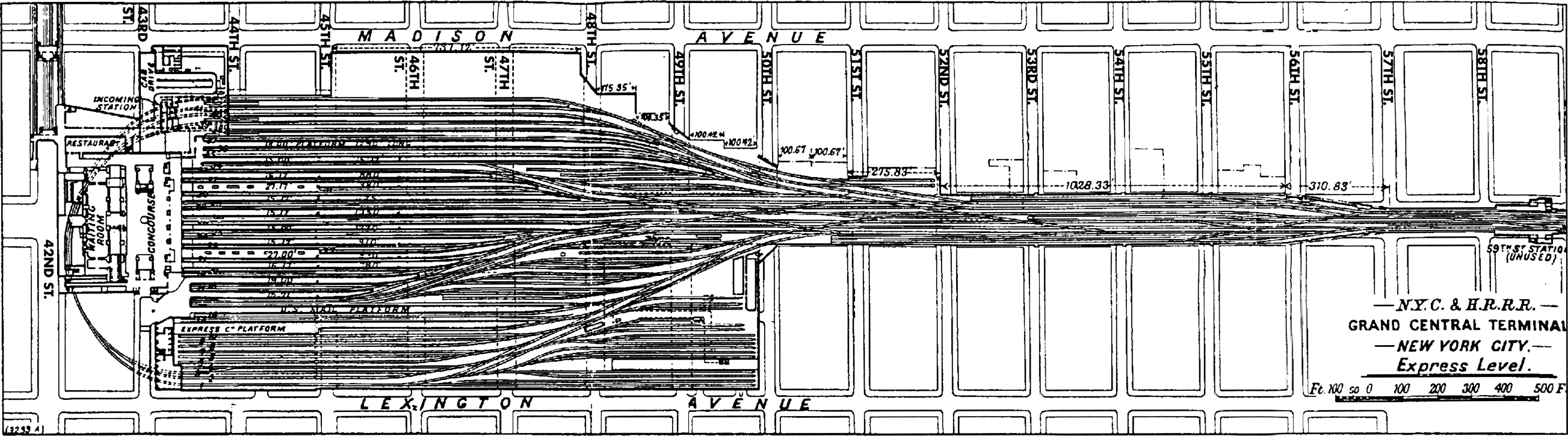
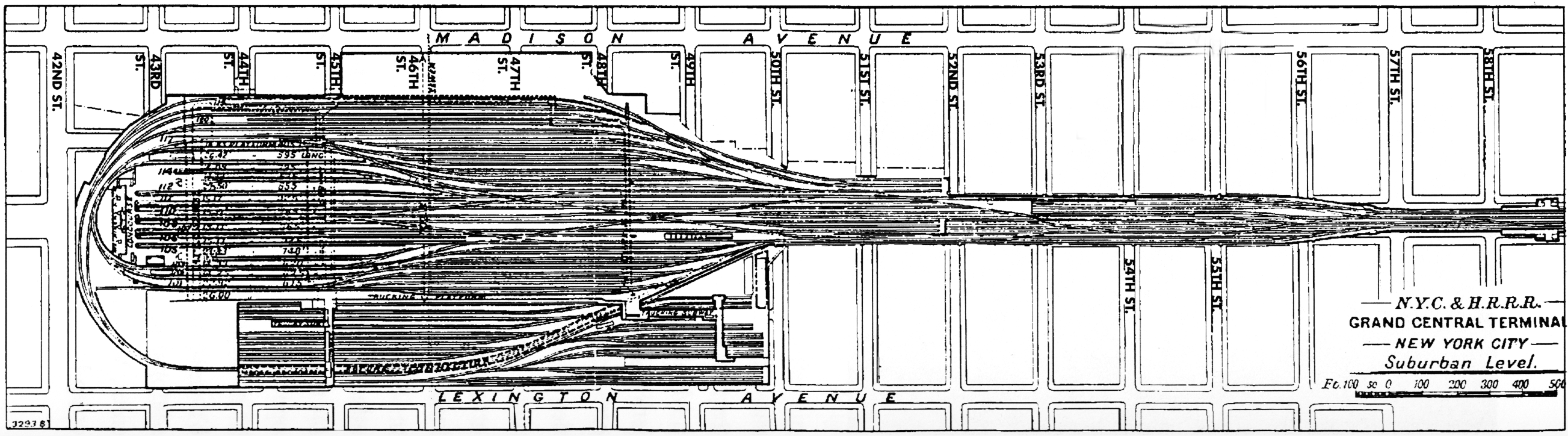
c. 1909 layout of the upper-level mainline tracks (top) and lower-level suburban tracks (bottom), showing balloon loops

The terminal holds a Guinness World Record as the railroad station with the most platforms: 28, which support 44 platform numbers. All are island platforms except one side platform. Odd-numbered tracks are usually on the east side of the platform; even-numbered tracks on the west side. As of 2016, there are 67 tracks, of which 41 are in regular passenger use, serving Metro-North. At its opening, the train shed contained 123 tracks, including duplicate track numbers and storage tracks, with a combined length of 19.5 miles (31.4 km).

The tracks slope down as they exit the station to the north, to help departing trains accelerate and arriving ones slow down. Because of the size of the rail yards, Park Avenue and its side streets from 43rd to 59th Streets are raised on viaducts, and the surrounding blocks were covered over by various buildings.

At its busiest, the terminal is served by an arriving train every 58 seconds.

==== Track distribution ====
The upper Metro-North level has 42 numbered tracks. Twenty-nine serve passenger platforms; these are numbered 11 to 42, east to west. Of these 29 tracks, 28 are used for passenger service in normal operation; track 14 is used for various maintenance purposes, most notably the loading of the terminal's garbage onto an outbound train for disposal elsewhere. Tracks 12, 22, and 31 do not exist; track 12 was replaced with a platform, while the paths of tracks 22 and 31 are occupied by the Grand Central North passageways. To the east of the upper platforms sits the East Yard: ten storage tracks numbered 1 through 10 from east to west. A balloon loop runs from Tracks 38–42 on the far west side of the station, around the other tracks, and back to storage Tracks 1–3 at the far east side of the station; this allows trains to turn around more easily.

North of the East Yard is the Lex Yard, a secondary storage yard under the Waldorf Astoria Hotel. The yard formerly served the power plant for Grand Central Terminal. Its twelve tracks are numbered 51 through 65 from east to west (track numbers 57, 58, and 62 do not exist). Two private loading platforms, which cannot be used for passenger service, sit between tracks 53 and 54 and between tracks 61 and 63. Track 61 is known for being a private track for United States President Franklin D. Roosevelt; part of the original design of the Waldorf Astoria, it was mentioned in The New York Times in 1929 and first used in 1938 by John J. Pershing, a top U.S. general during World War I. Roosevelt would travel into the city using his personal train, pull into Track 61, and take a specially designed elevator to the surface. It has been used occasionally since Roosevelt's death. The upper level also contains 22 more storage sidings.

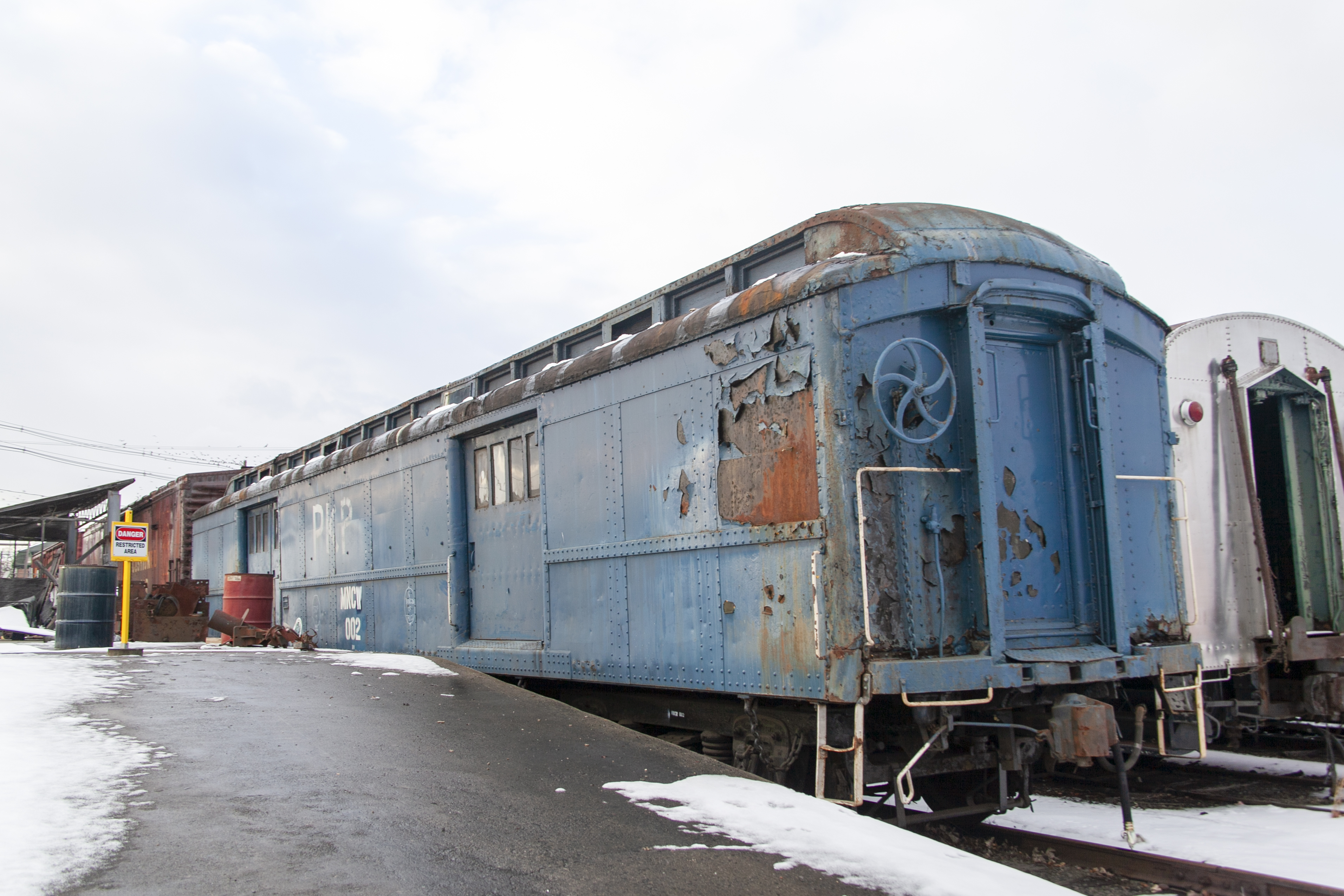
Baggage car mistakenly identified as Franklin D. Roosevelt's personal car, on display at the Danbury Railway Museum

Track 63 held MNCW #002, a baggage car, for about 20 to 30 years. The railcar's location near Roosevelt's Track 61 led former tour guide Dan Brucker and others to claim, erroneously, that this was the president's personal train car used for transporting his limousine. The baggage car was moved to the Danbury Railway Museum in 2019.

The lower Metro-North level had 27 tracks numbered 100 to 126, east to west. Two were originally intended for mail trains and two were for baggage handling. Today, only Tracks 102–114 are used for passenger service,. and track 115 is used for garbage trains. The lower-level balloon loop, whose curve was much sharper than that of the upper-level loop and could only handle electric multiple units used on commuter lines was removed at an unknown date. Tracks 116–125 were demolished to make room for the Long Island Rail Road (LIRR) concourse constructed underneath the Metro-North station as part of the East Side Access project.

The upper and lower levels have different track layouts and, as such, are supported by different sets of columns. The upper level is supported by ultra-strong columns, some of which can carry over 7 million foot-pounds force (9,500,000 J).

The LIRR terminal constructed as part of East Side Access has four platforms and eight tracks numbered 201–204 and 301–304 in two 100-foot-deep (30 m) double-decked caverns below the Metro-North station. It has four tracks and two platforms in each of the two caverns, with each cavern containing two tracks and an island platform on each level. A mezzanine is located on a center level between the LIRR's two track levels.

=== Office spaces and control center ===
Upper floors of the terminal primarily hold MTA offices. These spaces and most others in the terminal are not open to the public, requiring key cards to access. The fifth floor holds the office of the terminal's director, overlooking the Main Concourse. The seventh floor contains Metro-North's situation room (a board room for police and terminal directors to handle emergencies), as well as the offices of the Fleet Department.

Grand Central Terminal has an Operations Control Center on its sixth floor, where controllers monitor the track interlockings with computers. Completed in 1993, the center is operated by a crew of about 24 people. The terminal was originally built with five signal control centers, labeled A, B, C, F, and U, that collectively controlled all of the track interlockings around the terminal. The interlockings used to be of electro-mechanical type, supplied by General Railway Signal (GRS). Each switch was electrically controlled by a lever in one of the signal towers, where lights illuminated on track maps to show which switches were in use. As trains passed a given tower, the signal controllers reported the train's engine and timetable numbers, direction, track number, and the exact time. In 1993, the original interlockings machines were replaced with 17 GRS VPI microprocessors.

Tower U controlled the interlocking between 48th and 58th streets; Tower C, the storage spurs; and Tower F, the turning loops. A four-story underground tower at 49th Street housed the largest of the signal towers: Tower A, which handled the upper-level interlockings via 400 levers, and Tower B, which handled the lower-level interlockings with 362 levers. The towers housed offices for the stationmaster, yardmaster, car-maintenance crew, electrical crew, and track-maintenance crew. There were also break rooms for conductors, train engineers, and engine men. After Tower B was destroyed in a fire in 1986, the signal towers were consolidated into the modern control center.

=== Hospital ===
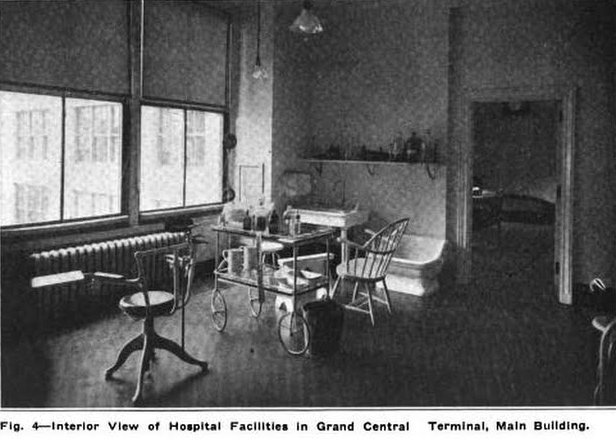
Hospital room in the terminal, 1915

During the terminal's construction, an "accident room" was set up to treat worker injuries in a wrecking car in the terminal's rail yard. Later on, a small hospital was established in the temporary station building on Lexington Avenue to care for injured workers. The arrangement was satisfactory, leading to the creation of a permanent hospital, the Grand Central Emergency Hospital, in Grand Central Terminal in 1911. The hospital was used for every employee injury as well as for passengers. In 1915, it had two physicians who treated a monthly average of 125 new cases per month and 450 dressings. The space had four rooms: Room A (the waiting room), Room B (the operating room), Room C (a private office), and Room D (for resting patients). The hospital was open at least until 1963; a Journal News article that year noted that the hospital treated minor to moderate ailments and was open every day between 8 a.m. and 5 p.m.

=== Libraries ===
Located on an upper floor above the Apple Store, the Williamson Library is a meeting space and research center for the New York Railroad Enthusiasts. Upon its founding in 1937, the association was granted use of the space in perpetuity by Frederick Ely Williamson, once president of the New York Central Railroad as well as a rail enthusiast and member of the association. Today, it contains about 3,000 books, newspapers, films, photographs, and other documents about railroads, along with artifacts, including part of a 20th Century Limited red carpet. The library is only accessible through secure areas, making it little known to the public and not included in tours of the terminal's hidden attributes. The association holds monthly meetings in the space, open to new visitors for free, and allows research visits by appointment.

Another library, the Frank Julian Sprague Memorial Library of the Electric Railroaders Association, existed on the terminal's fourth floor from 1979 to 2014. The library had about 500,000 publications and slides, focusing on electric rail and trolley lines. A large amount of these works were donated to the New York Transit Museum in 2013, or placed in storage. The now-8,000-volume library was moved to the Shore Line Trolley Museum in Connecticut in 2014, where it could operate with more staff attention and public access.

== Architecture ==
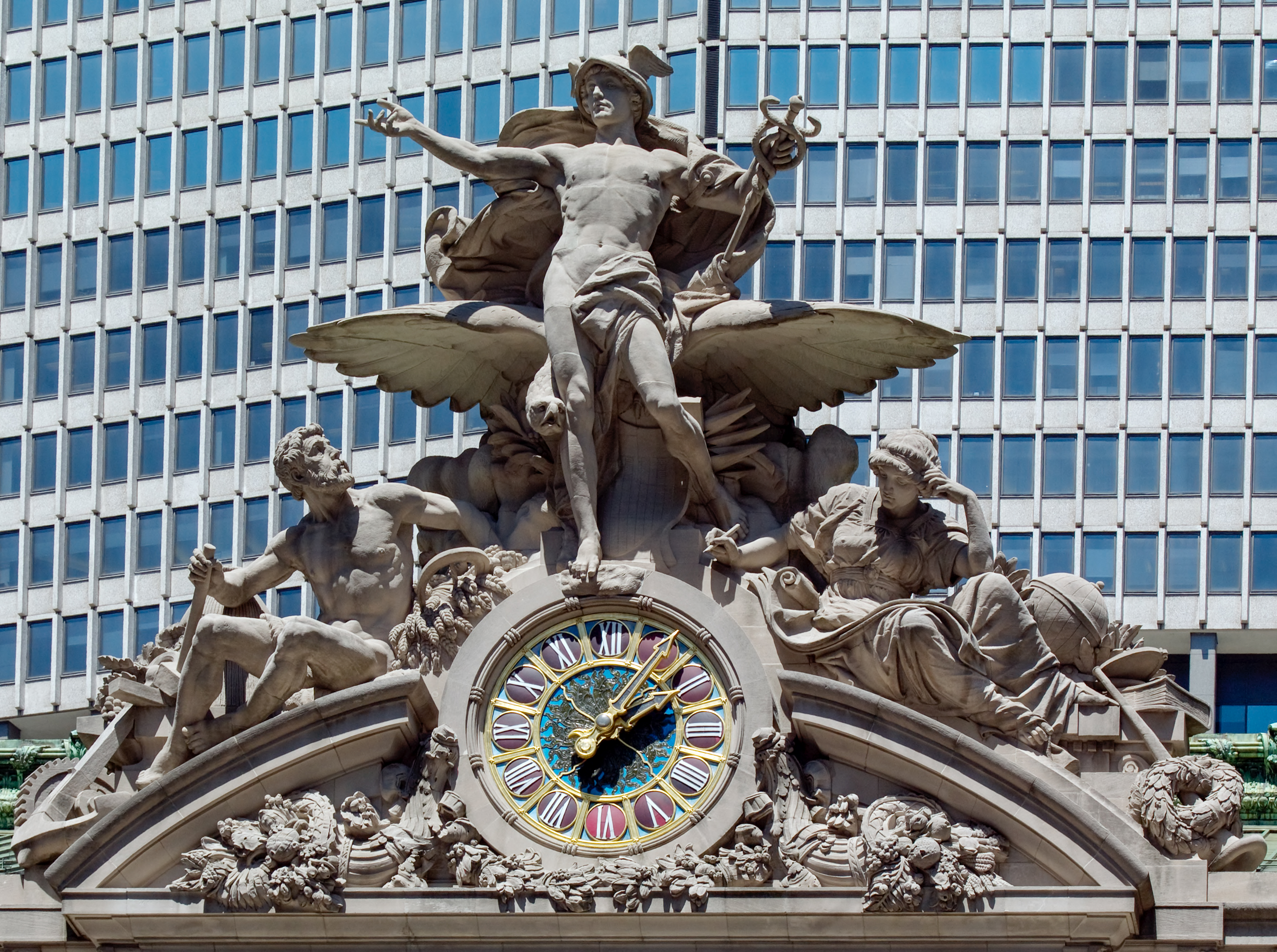
Glory of Commerce, a sculptural group by Jules-Félix Coutan

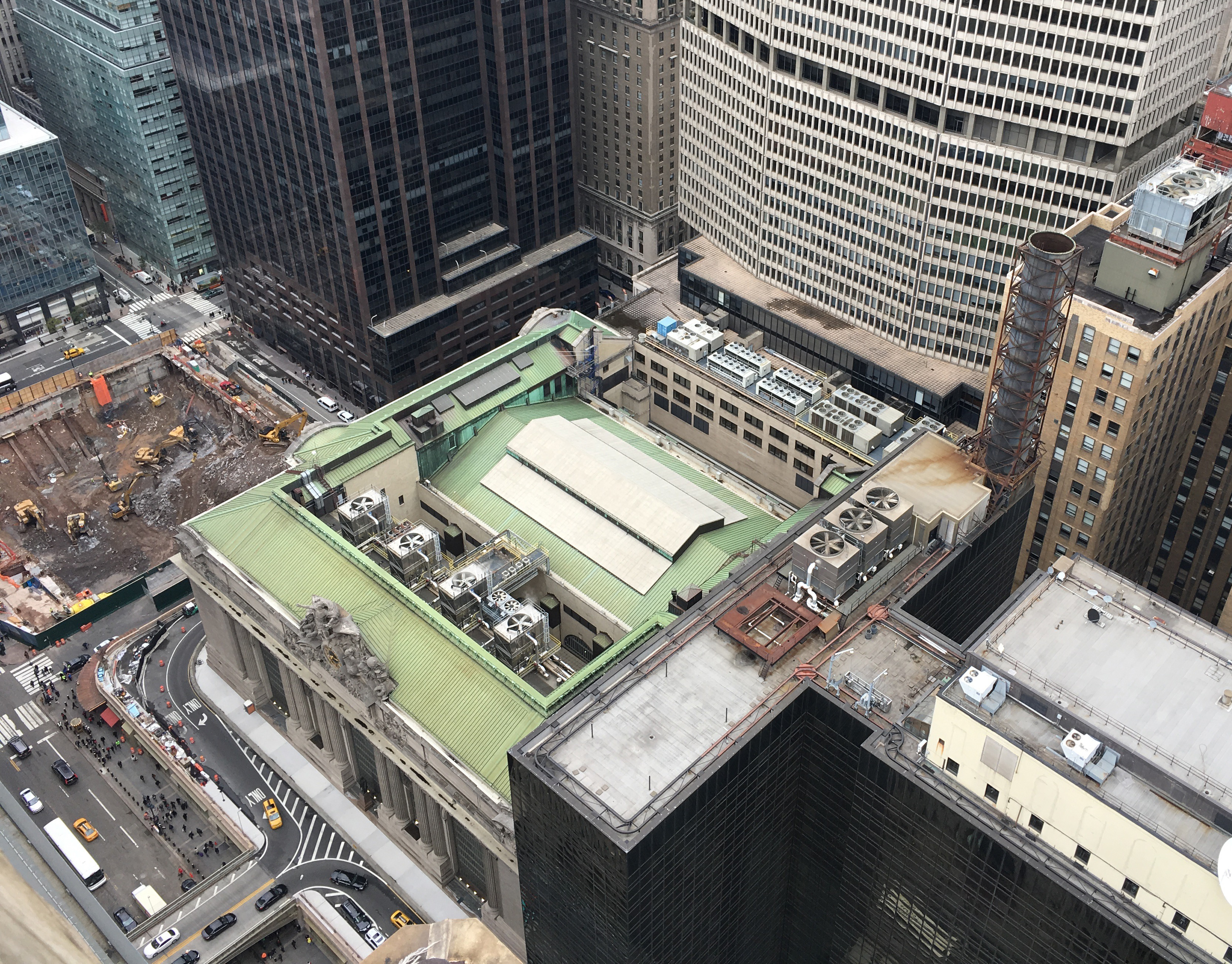
View of the station house looking northwest; the Main Concourse roof is visible in the building's center

Grand Central Terminal was designed in the Beaux-Arts style by Reed and Stem, which handled the overall design of the terminal, and Warren and Wetmore, which mainly made cosmetic alterations to the exterior and interior. Various elements inside the terminal were designed by French architects and artists Jules-Félix Coutan, Sylvain Salières, and Paul César Helleu. Grand Central has monumental spaces as well as meticulously crafted detail, especially on its facade, which is based on an overall exterior design by Whitney Warren.

The terminal is widely recognized and favorably viewed by the American public. In America's Favorite Architecture, a 2006–07 public survey by the American Institute of Architects, respondents ranked it their 13th-favorite work of architecture in the country, and their fourth-favorite in the city and state after the Empire State Building, Chrysler Building, and St. Patrick's Cathedral. In 2012, the American Society of Civil Engineers designated it a Historic Civil Engineering Landmark; one year later, historian David Cannadine described it as one of the most majestic buildings of the twentieth century.

As proposed in 1904, Grand Central Terminal was bounded by Vanderbilt Avenue to the west, Lexington Avenue to the east, 42nd Street to the south, and 45th Street to the north. It included a post office on its east side. The east side of the station house proper is an alley called Depew Place, which was built along with the Grand Central Depot annex in the 1880s and mostly decommissioned in the 1900s when the new terminal was built.

As first built, the station house measured about 722 feet (220 m) along Vanderbilt Avenue (120 feet longer than originally planned) and 300 feet (91 m) on 42nd Street. Floors above the first story are set back about 50 feet, making the rest of the station house originally measure 290 by 670 feet. The station is about 125 feet (38 m) tall.

=== Structure and materials ===
The station and its rail yard have steel frames. The building also uses large steel columns designed to hold the weight of a 20-story office building, which was to be built when additional room was required.

The facade and structure of the terminal building primarily use granite. Because granite emits radiation, people who work full-time in the station receive an average dose of 525 mrem/year, more than permitted in nuclear power facilities. The base of the exterior is Stony Creek granite, while the upper portion is of Indiana limestone, from Bedford, Indiana.

The interiors use several varieties of stone, including imitation Caen stone for the Main Concourse; cream-colored Botticino marble for the interior decorations; and pink Tennessee marble for the floors of the Main Concourse, Biltmore Room, and Vanderbilt Hall, as well as the two staircases in the Main Concourse. Real Caen stone was judged too expensive, so the builders mixed plaster, sand, lime, and Portland cement. Most of the remaining masonry is made from concrete. Guastavino tiling, a fireproof tile-and-cement vault pattern patented by Rafael Guastavino, is used in various spaces.

=== Facade ===
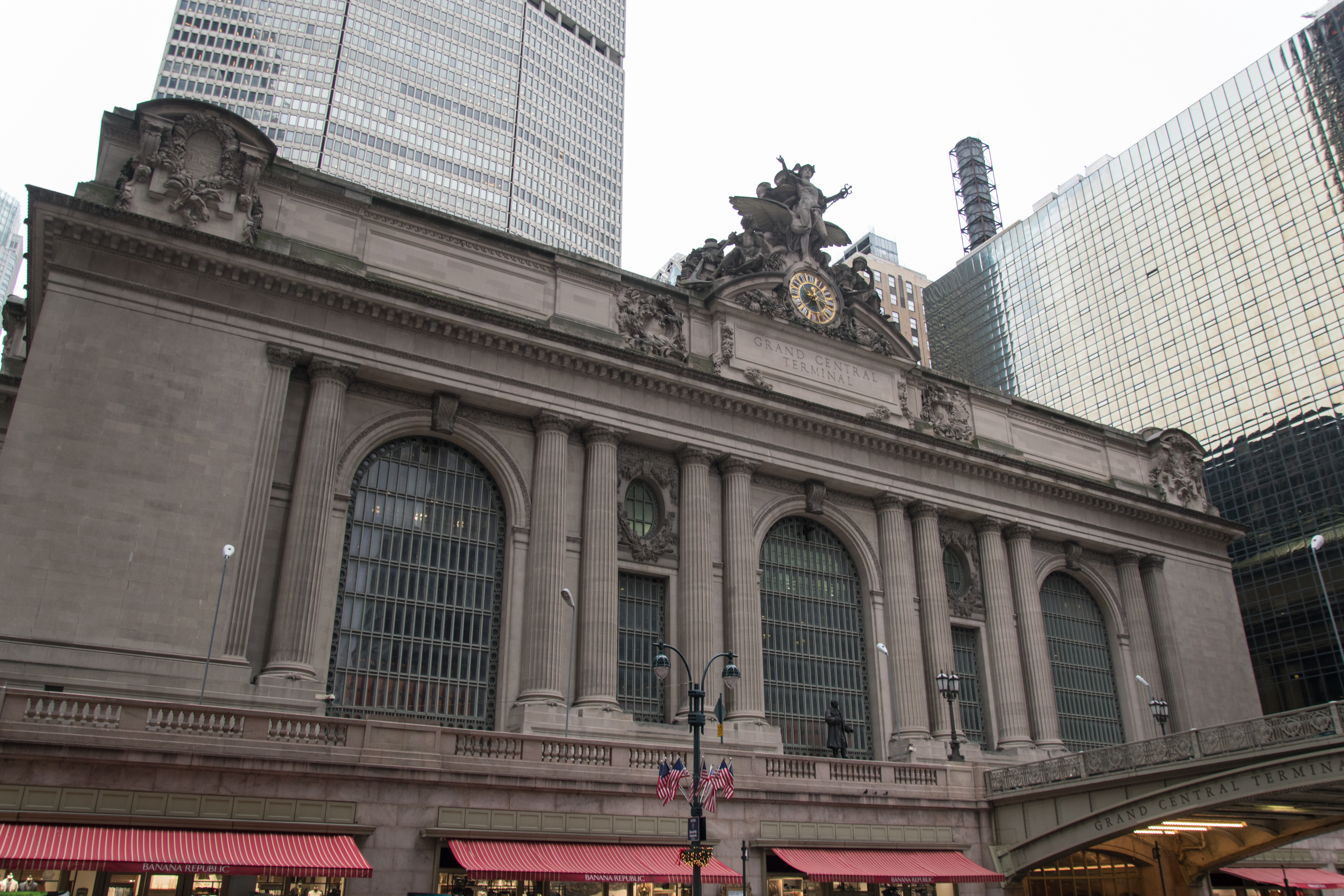
The south facade features a set of three arched windows, with the Glory of Commerce sculpture at the top-center and the Vanderbilt statue at the bottom-center.

The terminal's main facade is situated on the building's southern side, facing 42nd Street. It includes a low first story supporting the main portion of the facade, which was key to the architects' vision of the building as a gateway to the city. Its trio of 60-by-30-foot arched windows are interspersed with ten fluted Doric columns that are partially attached to the granite walls behind them, though they are detached from one another. Each window bay is separated by a double pair of these columns, which are in turn separated by a smaller bay with narrow windows. The set of windows resembles an ancient Roman triumphal arch, while the column placement is reminiscent of the Louvre Colonnade. The facade was also designed to complement that of the New York Public Library Main Branch, another Beaux-Arts edifice on nearby Fifth Avenue.

The facade includes several large works of art. At the top of the south facade is an elaborate entablature featuring a 13-foot-wide (4.0 m) clock set in the middle of a round broken pediment, flanked by overflowing cornucopias. Above the clock is the Glory of Commerce sculptural group, a 48-foot-wide (15 m) work by Jules-Félix Coutan, which includes representations of Minerva, Hercules, and Mercury. At its unveiling in 1914, the work was considered the largest sculptural group in the world. Below these works, facing the Park Avenue Viaduct, is an 1869 statue of Cornelius Vanderbilt, longtime owner of New York Central. Sculpted by Ernst Plassmann, the 8.5-foot (2.6 m) bronze is the last remnant of a 150-foot bronze relief installed at the Hudson River Railroad depot at St. John's Park; it was moved to Grand Central Terminal in 1929.

=== Interior ===
==== Main Concourse ====
The Main Concourse, on the terminal's upper platform level, is located in the geographical center of the station building. The cavernous concourse measures 275 ft (84 m) long by 120 ft (37 m) wide by 125 ft (38 m) high; a total of about 35,000 square feet (3,300 m^{2}). Its vastness was meant to evoke the terminal's "grand" status.

==== Iconography ====
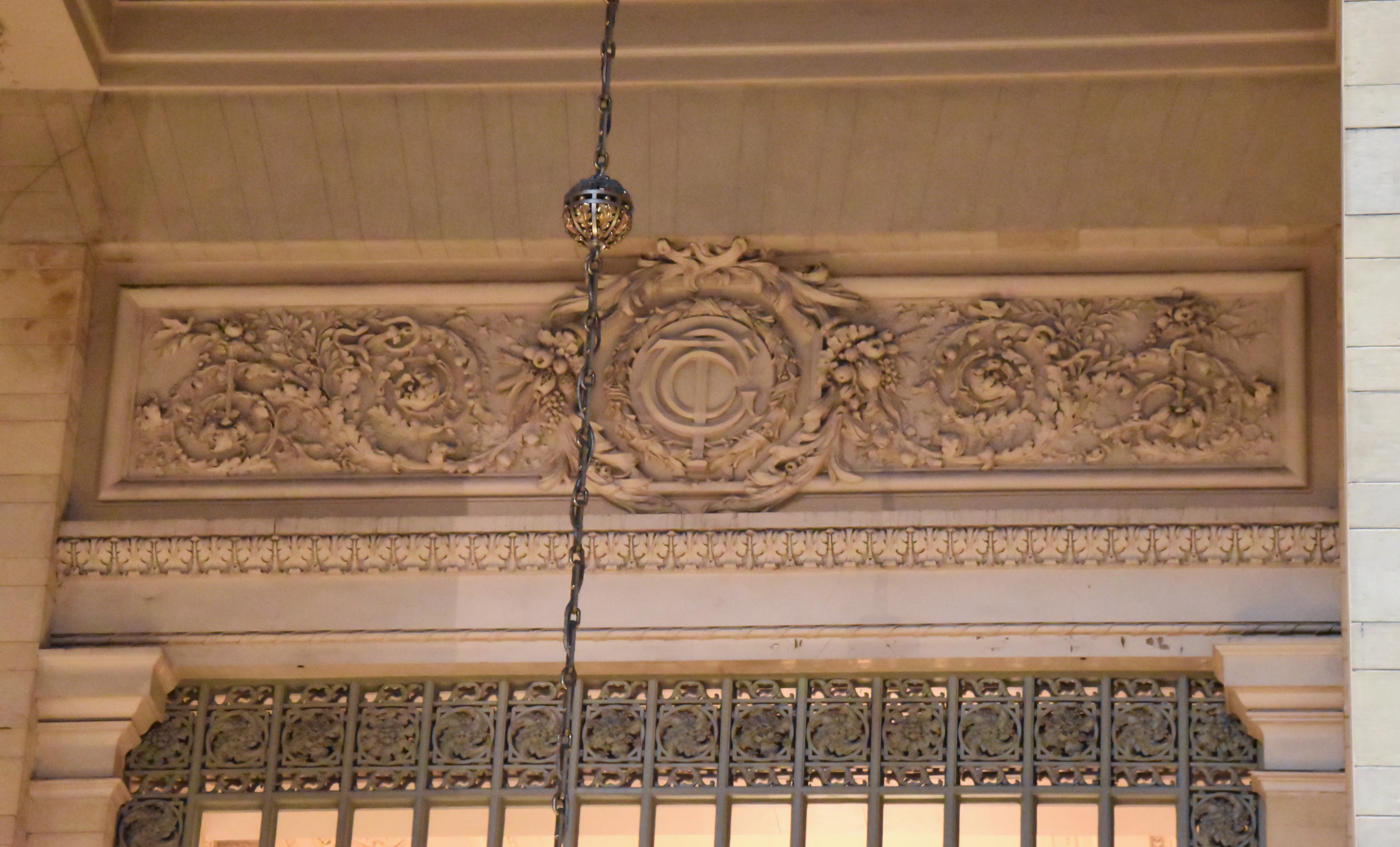
Frieze displaying the terminal's original logo

Many parts of the terminal are adorned with sculpted oak leaves and acorns, nuts of the oak tree. Cornelius Vanderbilt chose the acorn as the symbol of the Vanderbilt family, and adopted the saying "Great oaks from little acorns grow" as the family motto. Among these decorations is a brass acorn finial atop the four-sided clock in the center of the Main Concourse. Other acorn or oak leaf decorations include carved wreaths under the Main Concourse's west stairs; sculptures above the lunettes in the Main Concourse; metalwork above the elevators; reliefs above the train gates; and the electric chandeliers in the Main Waiting Room and Main Concourse. These decorations were designed by Salières.

The overlapping letters "G", "C", and "T" are sculpted into multiple places in the terminal, including in friezes atop several windows above the terminal's ticket office. The symbol was designed with the "T" resembling an upside-down anchor, intended as a reference to Cornelius Vanderbilt's commercial beginnings in shipping and ferry businesses. In 2017, the MTA based its new logo for the terminal on the engraved design; MTA officials said its black and gold colors have long been associated with the terminal. The spur of the letter "G" has a depiction of a railroad spike. The 2017 logo succeeded one created by the firm Pentagram for the terminal's centennial in 2013. It depicted the Main Concourse's ball clock set to 7:13, or 19:13 using a 24-hour clock, referencing the terminal's completion in 1913. Both logos omit the word "terminal" in its name, in recognition to how most people refer to the building.

=== Influence ===
Some of the buildings most closely modeled on Grand Central's design were designed by its two architecture firms. Warren and Wetmore went on to design many notable train stations, including the Poughkeepsie station in Poughkeepsie, New York; Union Station in Winnipeg, Manitoba; the Yonkers station in Yonkers, New York; Union Station in Houston; and Michigan Central Station in Detroit (also co-designed by Reed & Stem). Reed & Stem's successor firm Stem & Fellheimer designed Union Station in Utica, New York, which also has resemblances to Grand Central Terminal.

== Related structures ==
=== Park Avenue Viaduct ===
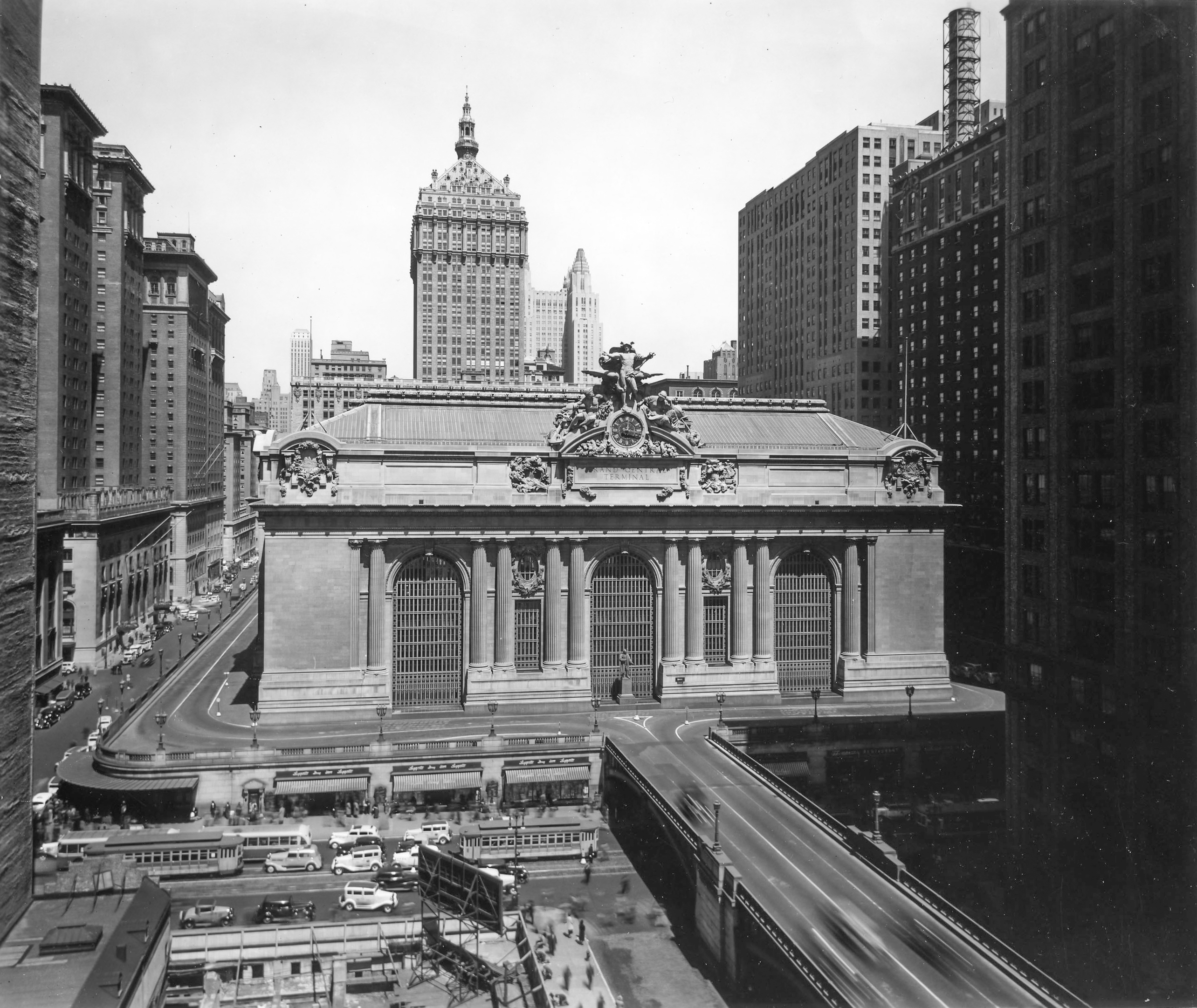
The viaduct as it approaches and wraps around Grand Central, 1944

The Park Avenue Viaduct is an elevated road that carries Park Avenue around the terminal building and the MetLife Building and through the Helmsley Building—three buildings that lie across the line of the avenue. The viaduct rises from street level on 40th Street south of Grand Central, splits into eastern (northbound) and western (southbound) legs above the terminal building's main entrance, and continues north around the station building, directly above portions of its main level. The legs of the viaduct pass around the MetLife Building, into the Helmsley Building, and return to street level at 46th Street.

The viaduct was built to facilitate traffic along 42nd Street and along Park Avenue, which at the time was New York City's only discontinuous major north–south avenue. When the western leg of the viaduct was completed in 1919, it served both directions of traffic, and also served as a second level for picking up and dropping off passengers. After an eastern leg for northbound traffic was added in 1928, the western leg was used for southbound traffic only. A sidewalk, accessible from the Grand Hyatt hotel, runs along the section of the viaduct that is parallel to 42nd Street.

=== Post office and baggage buildings ===
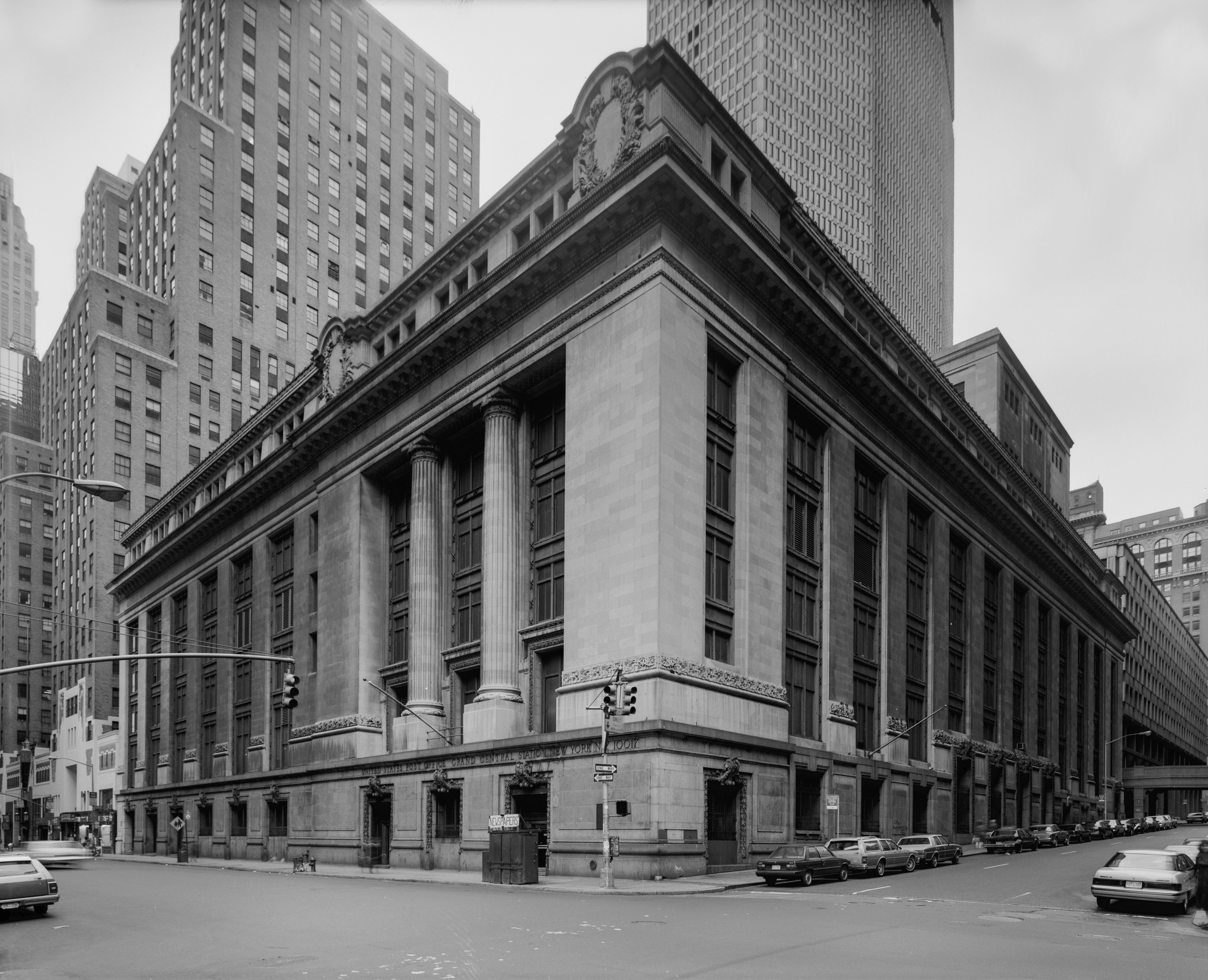
Grand Central Post Office Annex in 1988

Grand Central Terminal has a post office at 450 Lexington Avenue. Built from 1906 to 1909, it was topped with a high-rise tower in 1992. The original architecture matches that of the terminal, which was designed by the same architects. In 1915, postal operations expanded into a second building, also built by Warren & Wetmore, directly north of the original structure. This second building, erected as the Railroad Mail Service Building and today known as 237 Park Avenue, has been extensively renovated. Grand Central's post office buildings were designed to handle massive volumes of mail, though they were not as large as the James A. Farley Building, the post office that was built with the original Penn Station.

The terminal complex also originally included a six-story building for baggage handling just north of the main station building. Departing passengers unloaded their luggage from taxis or personal vehicles on the Park Avenue Viaduct, and elevators brought it to the baggage passageways (now part of Grand Central North), where trucks brought the luggage to the platforms. The process was reversed for arriving passengers. Biltmore Hotel guests arriving at Grand Central could get baggage delivered to their rooms. The baggage building was later converted to an office building, and was demolished in 1961 to make way for the MetLife Building.

=== Subway station ===
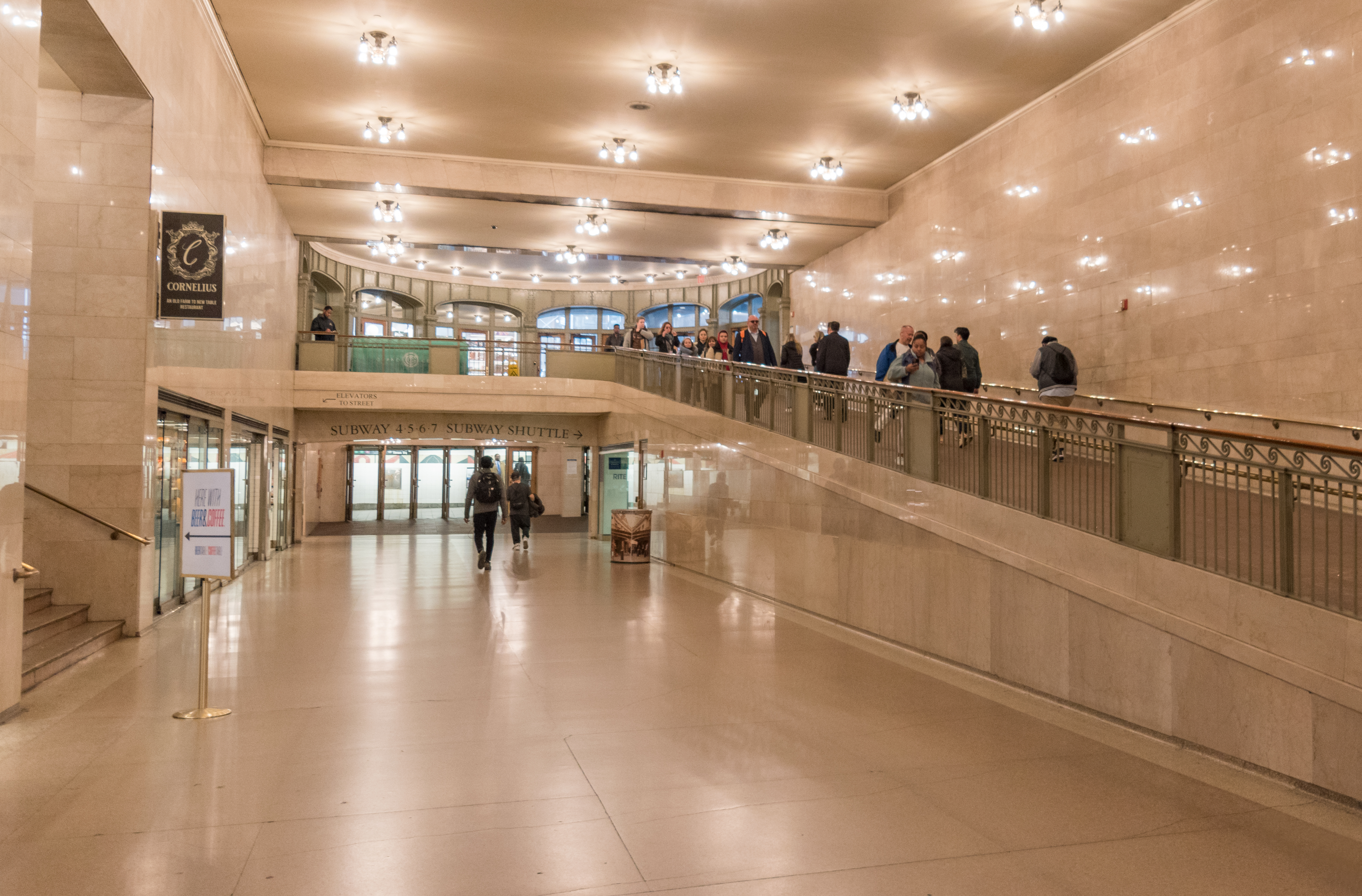
View of the Shuttle Passage facing the subway station entrance; the ramp at right leads to street level

The terminal's subway station, Grand Central–42nd Street, serves three lines: the IRT Lexington Avenue Line (serving the 4, 5, 6, and <6> trains), the IRT Flushing Line (serving the 7 and <7> trains), and the IRT 42nd Street Shuttle to Times Square. Originally built by the Interborough Rapid Transit Company (IRT), the lines are operated by the MTA as part of the New York City Subway.

The Main Concourse is connected to the subway platforms' mezzanine via the Shuttle Passage. The platforms can also be reached from the 42nd Street Passage via stairs, escalators, and an elevator to the fare control area for the Lexington Avenue and Flushing Lines.

The 42nd Street Shuttle platforms, located just below ground level, opened in 1904 as an express stop on the original IRT subway. The Lexington Avenue Line's platforms, which were opened in 1918 when the original IRT subway platforms were converted to shuttle use, run underneath the southeastern corner of the station building at a 45-degree angle, to the east of and at a lower level than the shuttle platforms. The Flushing Line platform opened in 1915; it is deeper than the Lexington Avenue Line's platforms because it is part of the Steinway Tunnel, a former streetcar tunnel that descends under the East River to the east of Grand Central. There was also a fourth line connected to Grand Central Terminal: a spur of the IRT Third Avenue elevated, which stopped at Grand Central starting in 1878; it was made obsolete by the subway's opening, and closed in 1923.

During the terminal's construction, there were proposals to allow commuter trains to pass through Grand Central and continue into the subway tracks. However, these plans were deemed impractical because commuter trains would have been too large to fit within the subway tunnels.

== History ==
Three buildings serving essentially the same function have stood on the current Grand Central Terminal's site.

=== Predecessors ===
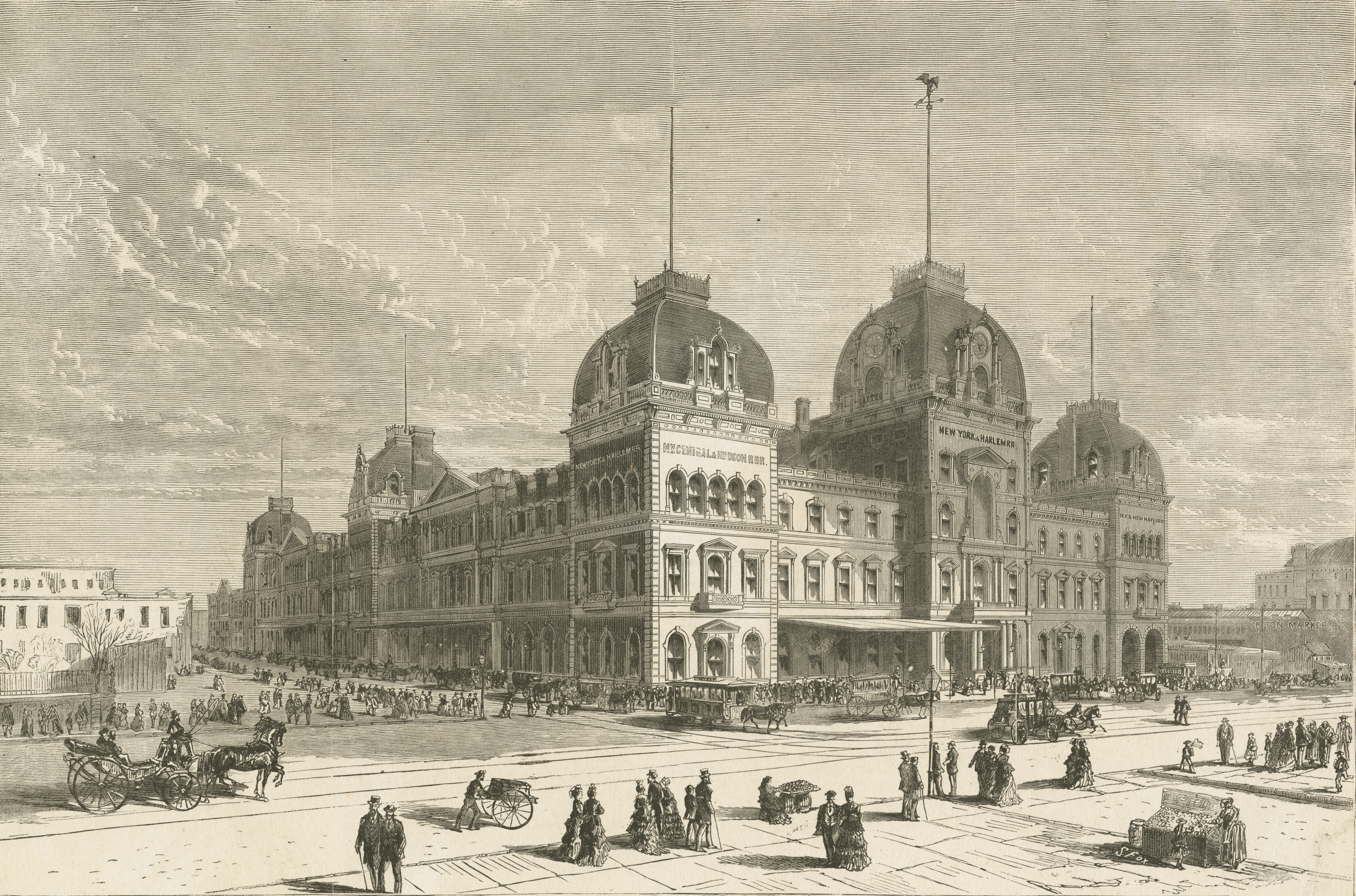
Grand Central Depot

Grand Central Terminal arose from a need to build a central station for the Hudson River Railroad, the New York and Harlem Railroad, and the New York and New Haven Railroad in modern-day Midtown Manhattan. The Harlem Railroad originally ran as a steam railroad on street level along Fourth Avenue (now Park Avenue), while the New Haven Railroad ran along the Harlem's tracks in Manhattan per a trackage agreement. The business magnate Cornelius Vanderbilt bought the Hudson River and New York Central Railroads in 1867, and merged them two years later. Vanderbilt developed a proposal to unite the three separate railroads at a single central station, replacing the separate and adjacent stations that created chaos in baggage transfer.

Vanderbilt commissioned John B. Snook to design his new station, dubbed Grand Central Depot, on the site of the 42nd Street depot. Construction ran from September 1, 1869, to October 1871. Designed in the Second Empire style, the station was considered the country's first to measure up to those in Europe.

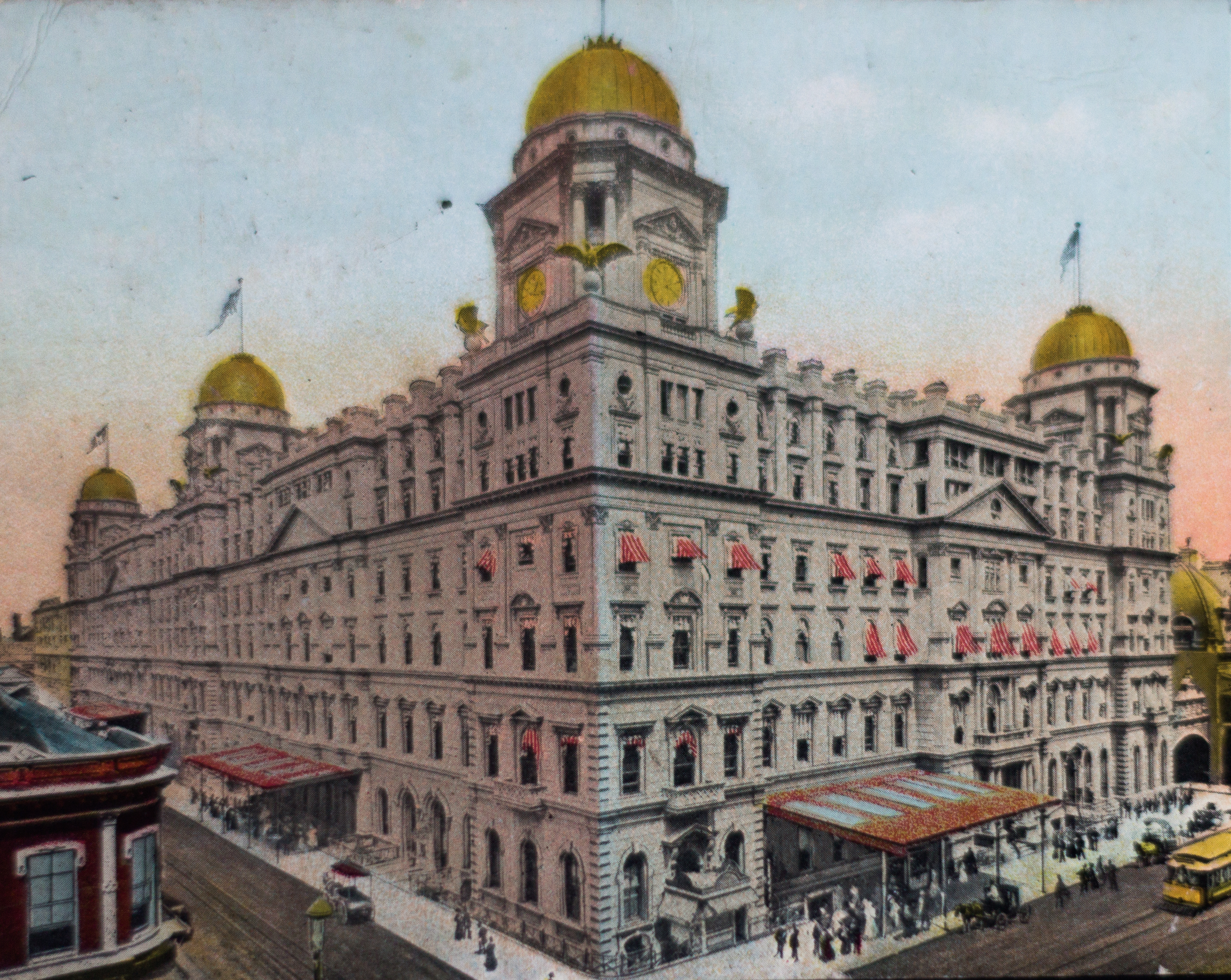
Grand Central Station, c. 1902

Expansions in 1895 and 1900—the latter coinciding with a renaming to Grand Central Station—could not keep up with the growth in passenger traffic, nor could they alleviate the problems of smoke and soot produced by steam locomotives in the Park Avenue Tunnel, the only approach to the station. After a deadly 1902 crash in the smoky tunnel, the New York State Legislature enacted a ban on steam trains in Manhattan, to begin in 1908. William J. Wilgus, the New York Central's vice president, proposed to tear down Grand Central Station and build a new, larger station with two levels of tracks, all electrified and underground. The railroad's board of directors approved the $35 million project in June 1903.

=== Replacement ===
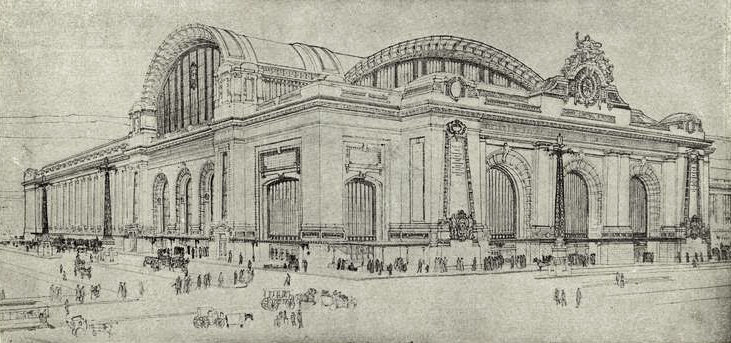
Proposal of the associated architects of Grand Central during its construction, 1905

The new Grand Central Terminal was to be the biggest terminal in the world, both in the size of the building and in the number of tracks. (Note: The projects included: 1. excavation of Grand Central Yard; 2. construction of Grand Central's station building; 3. electrification of the Harlem, Hudson, and New Haven divisions; 4. lowering the Port Morris Branch tracks in the Bronx; 5. building tunnels along the Hudson Division around the Harlem River Ship Canal in Marble Hill, Manhattan (ultimately never built, as the Harlem River Ship Canal was relocated); 6. eliminating grade crossings; 7. adding tracks on the Harlem and New Haven divisions) It was meant to compete with Pennsylvania Station, a majestic electric-train hub being built on Manhattan's west side for arch-rival Pennsylvania Railroad by McKim, Mead & White. New York Central picked the firm of Reed and Stem to handle the overall design of the station, and Warren and Wetmore for the station's Beaux-Arts exterior.

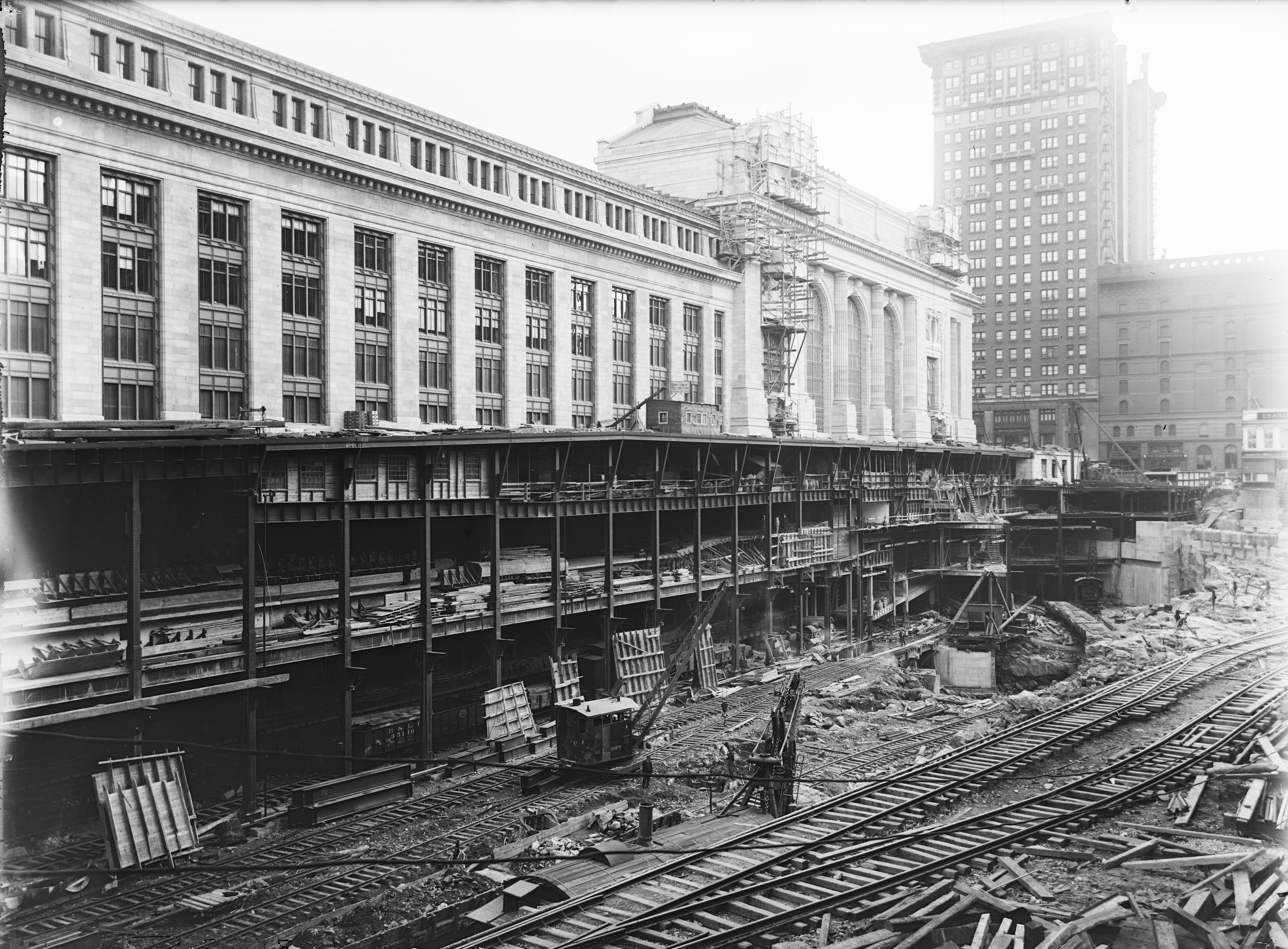
Terminal and baggage building construction c. 1912

Construction on Grand Central Terminal started on June 19, 1903. and proceeded in phases to prevent railroad service from being interrupted. About 3.2 million cubic yards (2,400,000 m^{3}) of the ground were excavated at depths of up to 10 floors, with 1,000 cubic yards (760 m^{3}) of debris being removed from the site daily. Over 10,000 workers were assigned to the project. The total cost of improvements, including electrification and the development of Park Avenue, was estimated at $180 million in 1910. The segments of all three lines running into Grand Central had been electrified by 1907. The last train left Grand Central Station at midnight on June 5, 1910, and the new terminal opened on February 2, 1913.

=== Heyday ===
The terminal spurred development in the surrounding area, particularly in Terminal City, a commercial and office district created above where the tracks were covered. The development of Terminal City also included the construction of the Park Avenue Viaduct, surrounding the station, in the 1920s. The new electric service led to increased development in New York City's suburbs, and passenger traffic on the commuter lines into Grand Central more than doubled in the seven years following the terminal's completion. Passenger traffic grew so rapidly that by 1918, New York Central proposed expanding Grand Central Terminal.

In 1923, the Grand Central Art Galleries opened in the terminal. A year after it opened, the galleries established the Grand Central School of Art, which occupied 7,000 square feet (650 m^{2}) on the seventh floor of the east wing of the terminal. The Grand Central School of Art remained in the east wing until 1944, and it moved to the Biltmore Hotel in 1958. (Note: They remained at the Biltmore for 23 years until 1981, and then moved to 24 West 57th Street, and ceased operations by 1994.)

=== Decline ===
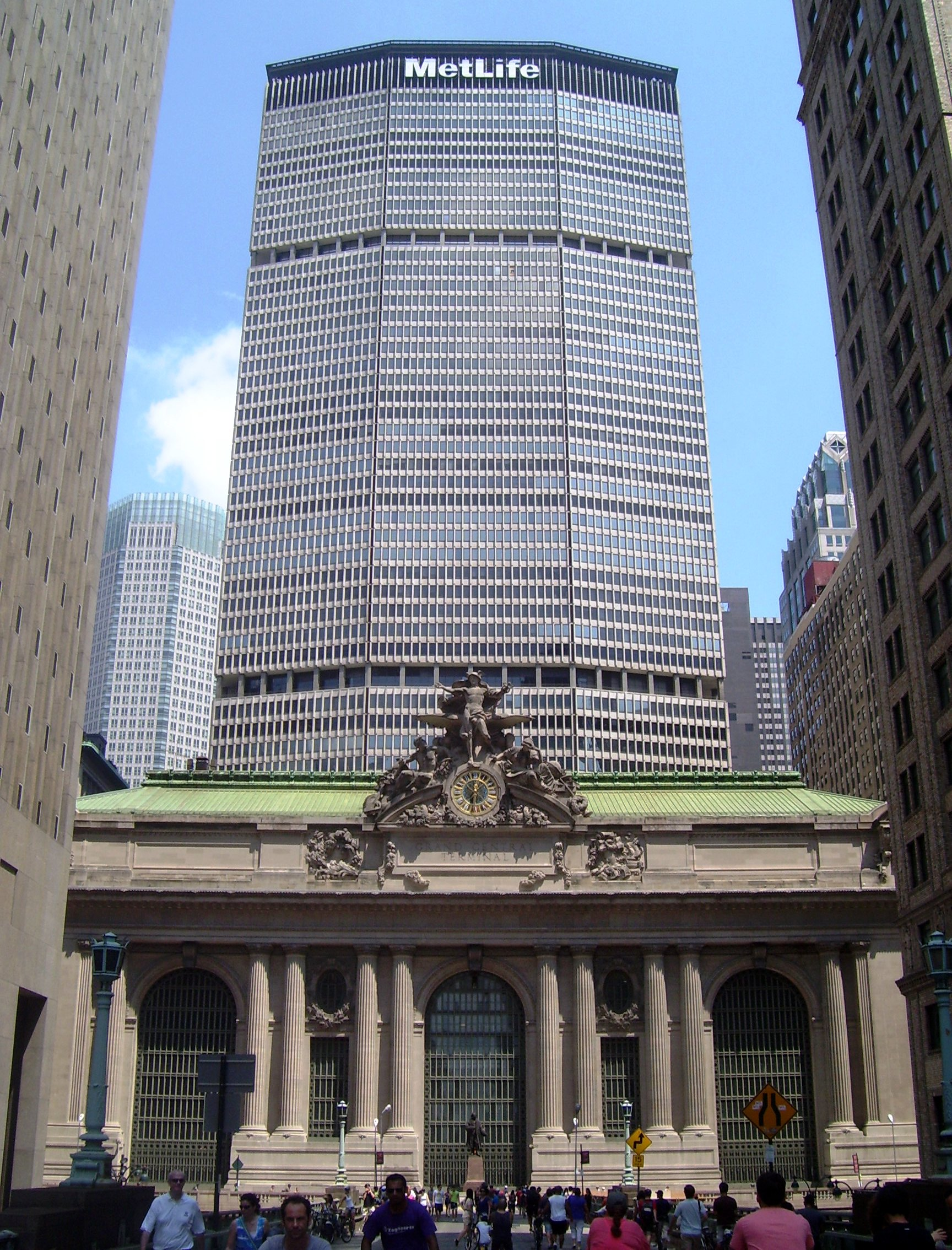
The MetLife Building was completed in 1963 above part of Grand Central Terminal.

In 1947, over 65 million people traveled through Grand Central, an all-time high. The station's decline came soon afterward with the beginning of the Jet Age and the construction of the Interstate Highway System. There were multiple proposals to alter the terminal, including several replacing the station building with a skyscraper; none of the plans were carried out. Though the main building site was not redeveloped, the Pan Am Building (now the MetLife Building) was erected just to the north, opening in 1963.

In 1968, New York Central, facing bankruptcy, merged with the Pennsylvania Railroad to form the Penn Central Railroad. The new corporation proposed to demolish Grand Central Terminal and replace it with a skyscraper, as the Pennsylvania Railroad had done with the original Penn Station in 1963. However, the New York City Landmarks Preservation Commission, which had designated Grand Central a city landmark in 1967, refused to consider the plans. The resulting lawsuit went to the Supreme Court of the United States, which ruled in favor of the city. After Penn Central went into bankruptcy in 1970, it retained title to Grand Central Terminal. When Penn Central reorganized as American Premier Underwriters (APU) in 1994, it retained ownership of Penn Central. In turn, APU was absorbed by American Financial Group.

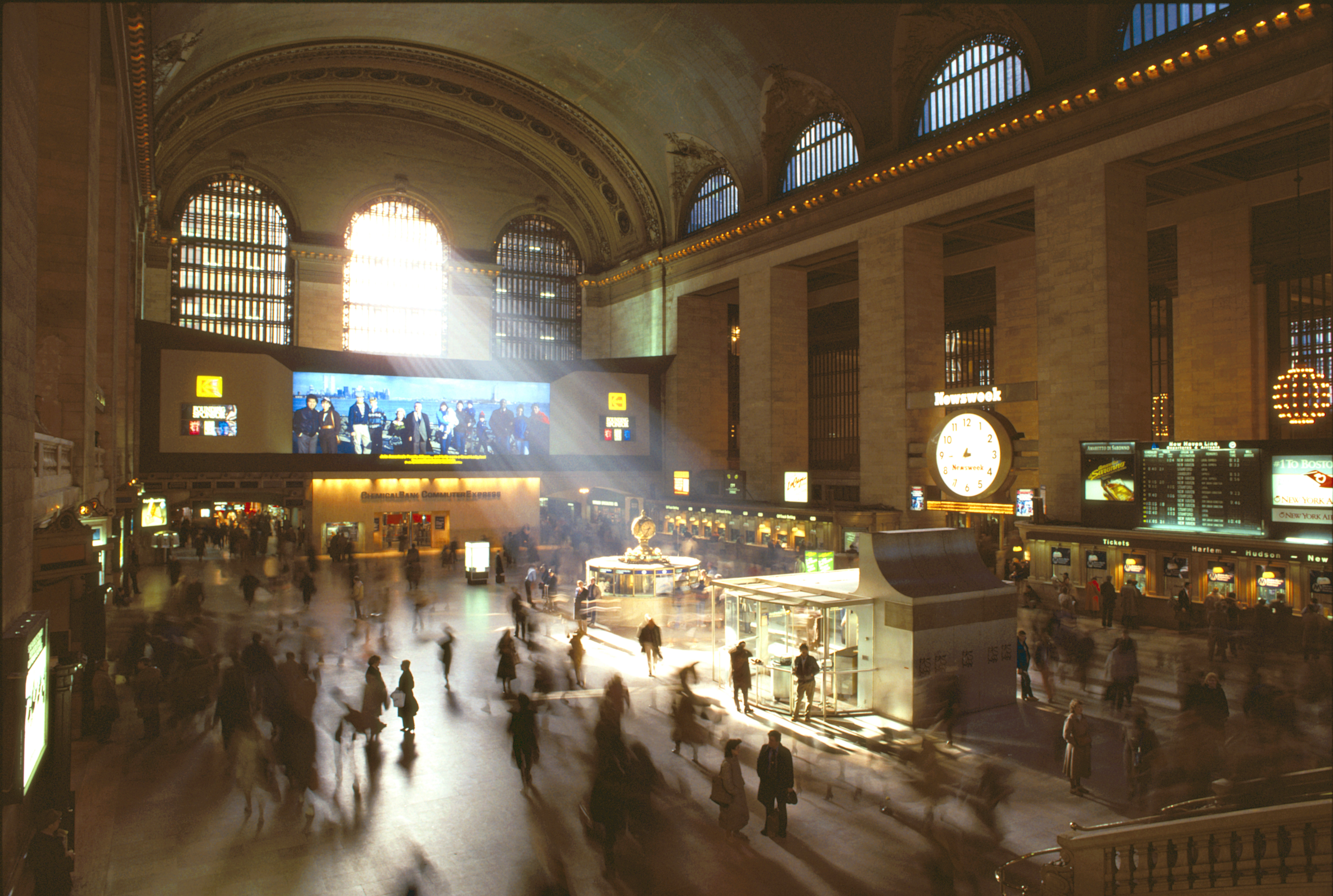
The Main Concourse in 1986, featuring the Kodak Colorama, the illuminated clock, and two banks

Grand Central and the surrounding neighborhood became dilapidated during the 1970s, and the interior of Grand Central was dominated by huge advertisements, which included the Kodak Colorama photos and the Westclox "Big Ben" clock. In 1975, Donald Trump bought the Commodore Hotel to the east of the terminal for $10 million and then worked out a deal with Jay Pritzker to transform it into one of the first Grand Hyatt hotels. Grand Central Terminal was listed on the National Register of Historic Places in 1975 and declared a National Historic Landmark in the following year. This period was marked by a bombing on September 10, 1976, when a group of Croatian nationalists planted a bomb in a coin locker at Grand Central Terminal and hijacked a plane; the bomb exploded while being disarmed and injured three NYPD officers and killed one bomb squad specialist.

The terminal was used for intercity transit until 1991. Amtrak, the national rail system formed in 1971, ran its last train from Grand Central on April 6, 1991, upon the completion of the Empire Connection on Manhattan's West Side. The connection allowed trains using the Empire Corridor from Albany, Toronto, and Montreal to use Penn Station. However, some Amtrak trains used Grand Central during the summers of 2017 and 2018 due to maintenance at Penn Station.

=== Renovation and subsequent expansions ===
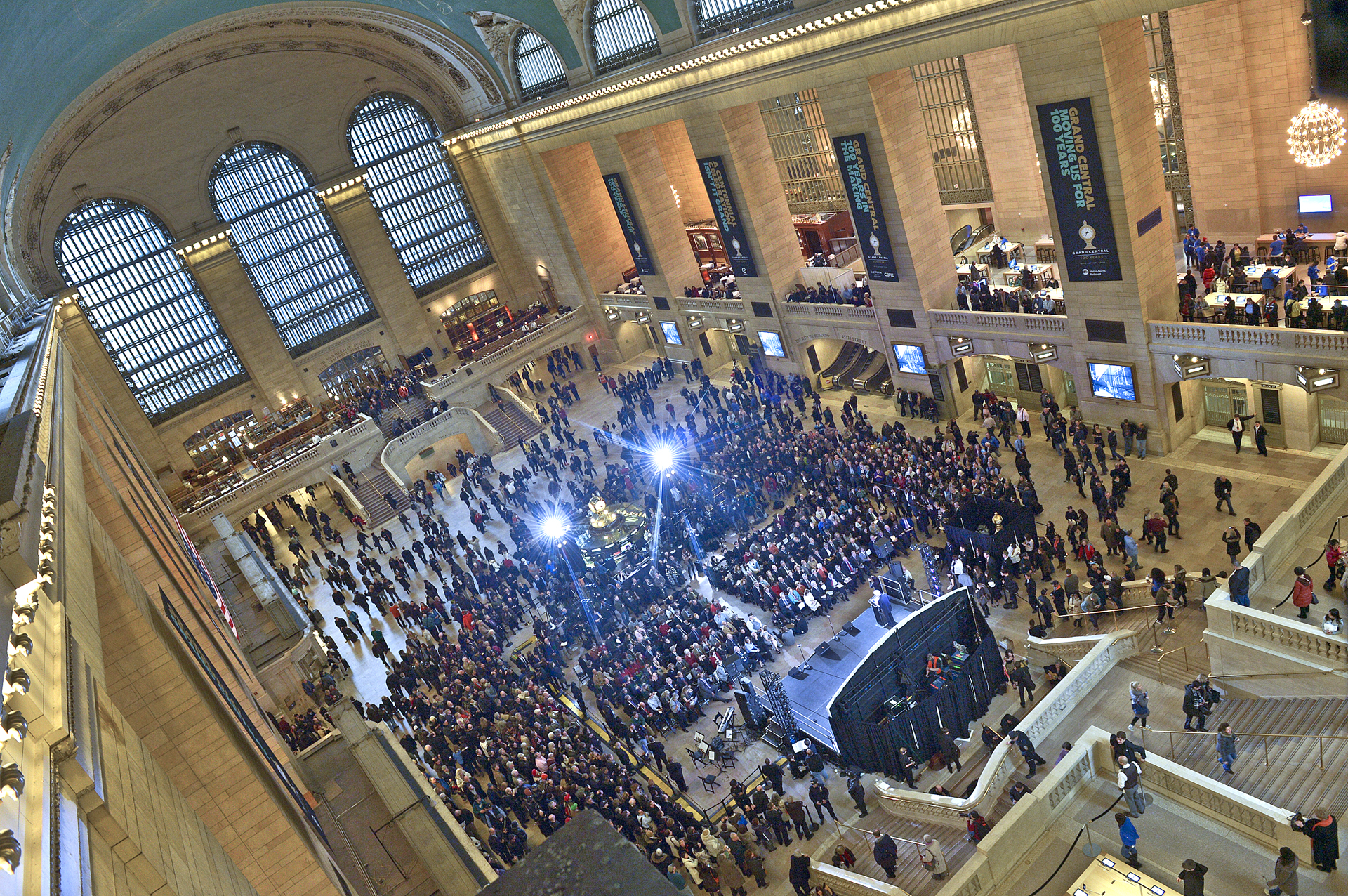
Centennial celebration performance, 2013

In 1988, the MTA commissioned a study of Grand Central Terminal, which concluded that parts of the terminal could be turned into a retail area.

In 1995, the agency began a $113.8 million renovation of the terminal's interior. All advertisements were removed and the station was restored; for example, the Main Concourse ceiling was cleaned to reveal the painted skyscape and constellations. The East Stairs, a curved monumental staircase on the east side of the Main Concourse, was added to match the West Stairs. The project's completion was marked with a re-dedication ceremony on October 1, 1998.

In December 2006, American Financial sold Grand Central Terminal to Midtown TDR Ventures, LLC, an investment group controlled by Argent Ventures, which renegotiated the lease with the MTA to last until 2274. In 2018, the MTA exercised its option to purchase the terminal, along with the Hudson and Harlem Lines. The agency took ownership of the terminal and rail lines in February 2020.

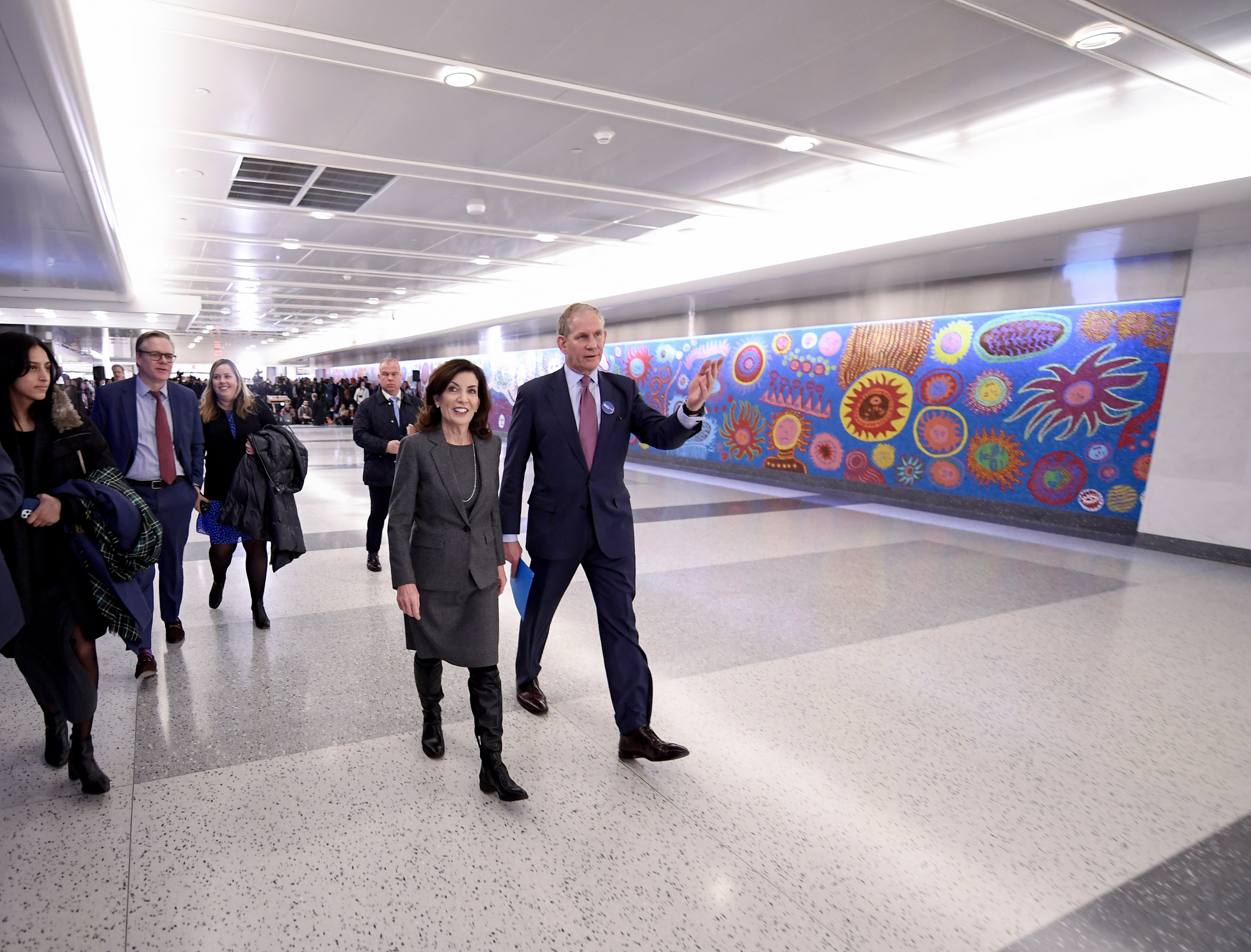
Governor Kathy Hochul and MTA Chair Janno Lieber at the opening of Grand Central Madison, 2023

On February 1, 2013, numerous displays, performances, and events were held to celebrate the terminal's centennial. The MTA awarded contracts to replace the display boards and public announcement systems and add security cameras at Grand Central Terminal in December 2017. The MTA also proposed to repair the Grand Central Terminal train shed's concrete and steel as part of the 2020–2024 MTA Capital Program. In February 2019, it was announced that the Grand Hyatt New York hotel that abuts Grand Central Terminal to the east would be torn down and replaced with a larger mixed-use structure over the next several years. In September 2020, the skyscraper One Vanderbilt opened, along with a train hall at its base, a pedestrian plaza connecting it to the terminal, and an underground passage to the complex's subway station. The plaza was built on a section of Vanderbilt Avenue, permanently closing the section to automobile traffic for the first time.

In January 2023, the MTA's new Grand Central Madison station opened beneath Grand Central Terminal. The new station, serving the Long Island Rail Road, was under development since 2007. The project, officially titled East Side Access, cost $11.1 billion. LIRR trains arrive and depart from a bi-level, eight-track tunnel with four platforms more than 90 feet (27 m) below the Metro-North tracks. The station includes a new 350,000-square-foot retail and dining concourse and new entrances at 45th, 46th, and 48th streets.

== Innovations ==
=== Passenger improvements ===
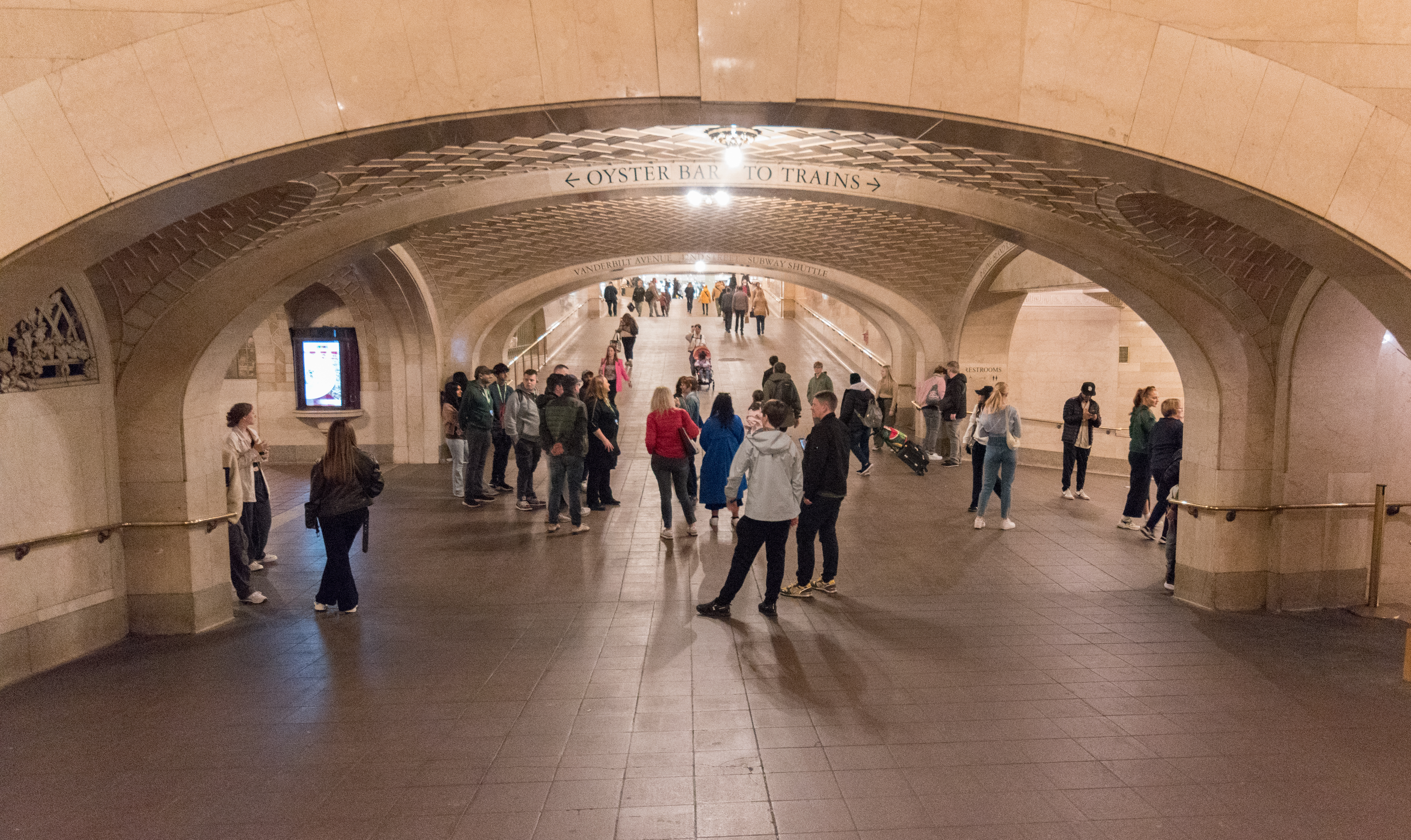
Incline between concourses, showing the whispering gallery outside the Oyster Bar

At the time of its completion, Grand Central Terminal offered several innovations in transit-hub design. One was the use of ramps, rather than staircases, to conduct passengers and luggage through the facility. Two ramps connected the lower-level suburban concourse to the main concourse; several more led from the main concourse to entrances on 42nd Street. These ramps allowed all travelers to easily move between Grand Central's two underground levels. There were also 15 passenger elevators and six freight-and-passenger elevators scattered around the station. The separation of commuter and intercity trains, as well as incoming and outgoing trains, ensured that most passengers on a given ramp would be traveling in the same direction. At its opening in 1913, the terminal was theoretically able to accommodate 100 million passengers a year.

The Park Avenue Viaduct, which wrapped around the terminal, allowed Park Avenue traffic to bypass the building without being diverted onto nearby streets, and reconnected the only north–south avenue in midtown Manhattan that had an interruption in it. The station building was also designed to accommodate the re-connection of both segments of 43rd Street by going through the concourse, if the City of New York had demanded it.

Designers of the new terminal tried to make it as comfortable as possible. Amenities included an oak-floored waiting room for women, attended to by maids; a shoeshine room, also for women; a room with telephones; a beauty salon with gender-separated portions; a dressing room, with maids available for a fee; and a men's barbershop, containing a public area with barbers from many cultures, as well as a rentable private space. Grand Central was designed with two concourses, one on each level. The "outbound" concourse could handle 15,000 people; the "inbound" concourse, 8,000. A waiting room adjoining each concourse could fit another 5,000. Brochures advertised the new Grand Central Terminal as a tourist-friendly space where "[t]imid travelers may ask questions with no fear of being rebuffed by hurrying trainmen, or imposed upon by hotel runners, chauffeurs or others in blue uniforms"; a safe and welcoming place for people of all cultures, where "special accommodations are to be provided for immigrants and gangs of laborers"; and a general tourist attraction "where one delights to loiter, admiring its beauty and symmetrical lines—a poem in stone". The waiting room by the Main Concourse, now Vanderbilt Hall, also had an advantage over many, including Penn Station's: Grand Central's waiting room was a tranquil place to wait, with all ticket booths, information desks, baggage areas, and meeting areas instead removed to the Main Concourse.

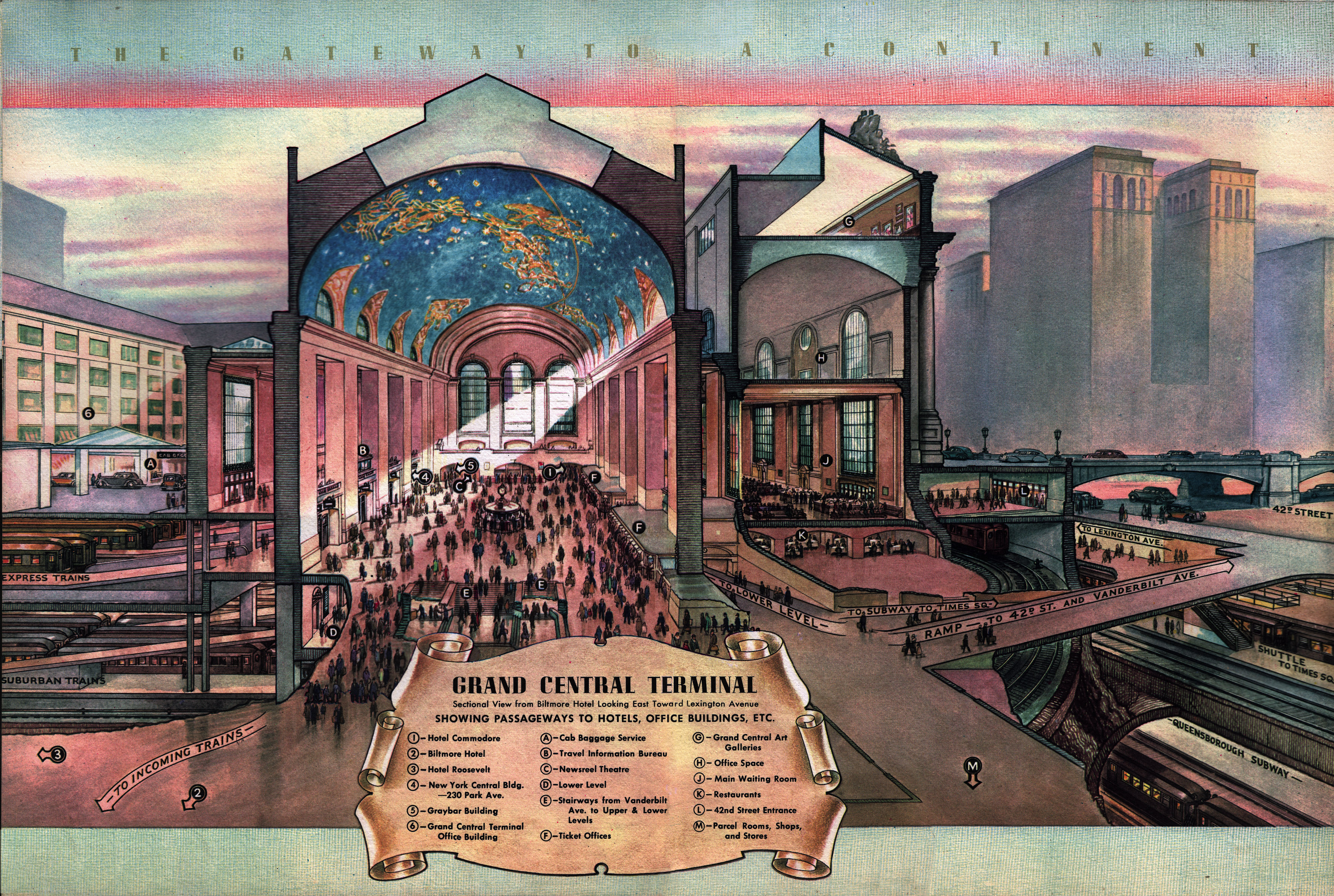
Cutaway drawing from 1939, illustrating the use of ramps, express and suburban tracks, and the viaduct

Every train at Grand Central Terminal departs one minute later than its posted departure time. The extra minute is intended to encourage passengers rushing to catch trains at the last minute to slow down.

All of the terminal's light fixtures are bare light bulbs. At the time of the terminal's construction, electricity was still a relatively new invention, and the inclusion of electric light bulbs showcased this innovation. In 2009, the incandescent light bulbs were replaced with energy- and money-saving fluorescent lamp fixtures.

When Grand Central Terminal opened, it hired two types of porters, marked with different-colored caps, to assist passengers. Porters with red caps served as bellhops, rolling luggage around Grand Central Terminal, and were rarely paid tips. There were more than 500 red-capped porters at one point. Porters with green caps, a position introduced in 1922, provided information services, sending out or receiving telegrams or phone messages for a fee. They later started dropping off and picking up packages as well. There were only twelve green-capped porters, as well as two messengers who brought messages to an exchange on the west side of the terminal.

=== Track improvements ===
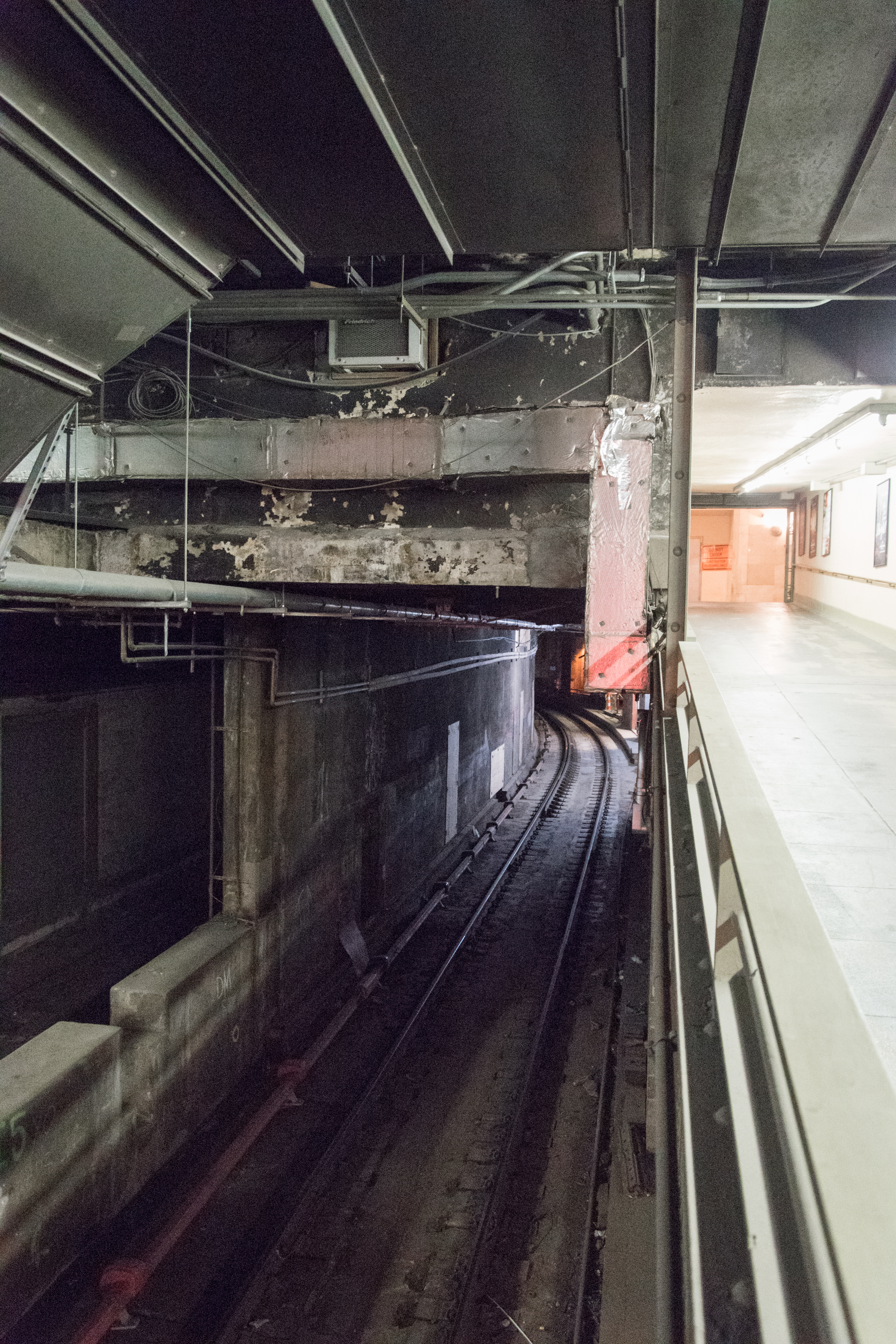
Balloon loop visible behind Track 42

Grand Central Terminal was built to handle 200 trains per hour, though actual traffic never came close to that. It had 46 tracks and 30 platforms, more than twice Penn Station's 21 tracks and 11 platforms. Its 70-acre (28 ha) rail yard could hold 1,149 cars, far more than the 366 in its predecessor station, and it dwarfed Penn Station's 28-acre (11 ha) yard.

As constructed, the upper level was for intercity trains, and the lower level for commuter trains. This allowed commuter and intercity passengers to board and exit trains without interfering with each other.

Balloon loops surrounding the station eliminated the need for complicated switching moves to bring the trains to the coach yards for service. At the time, passenger cars did not run on their own power, but were pulled by locomotives, and it was believed dangerous to perform locomotive shunting moves underground. Trains would drop passengers off at one side of the station, perhaps be stored or serviced in the rail yard, then use the turning loops and pick up passengers on the other side. The loops extended under Vanderbilt Avenue to the west and Lexington Avenue to the east.

=== Terminal City ===
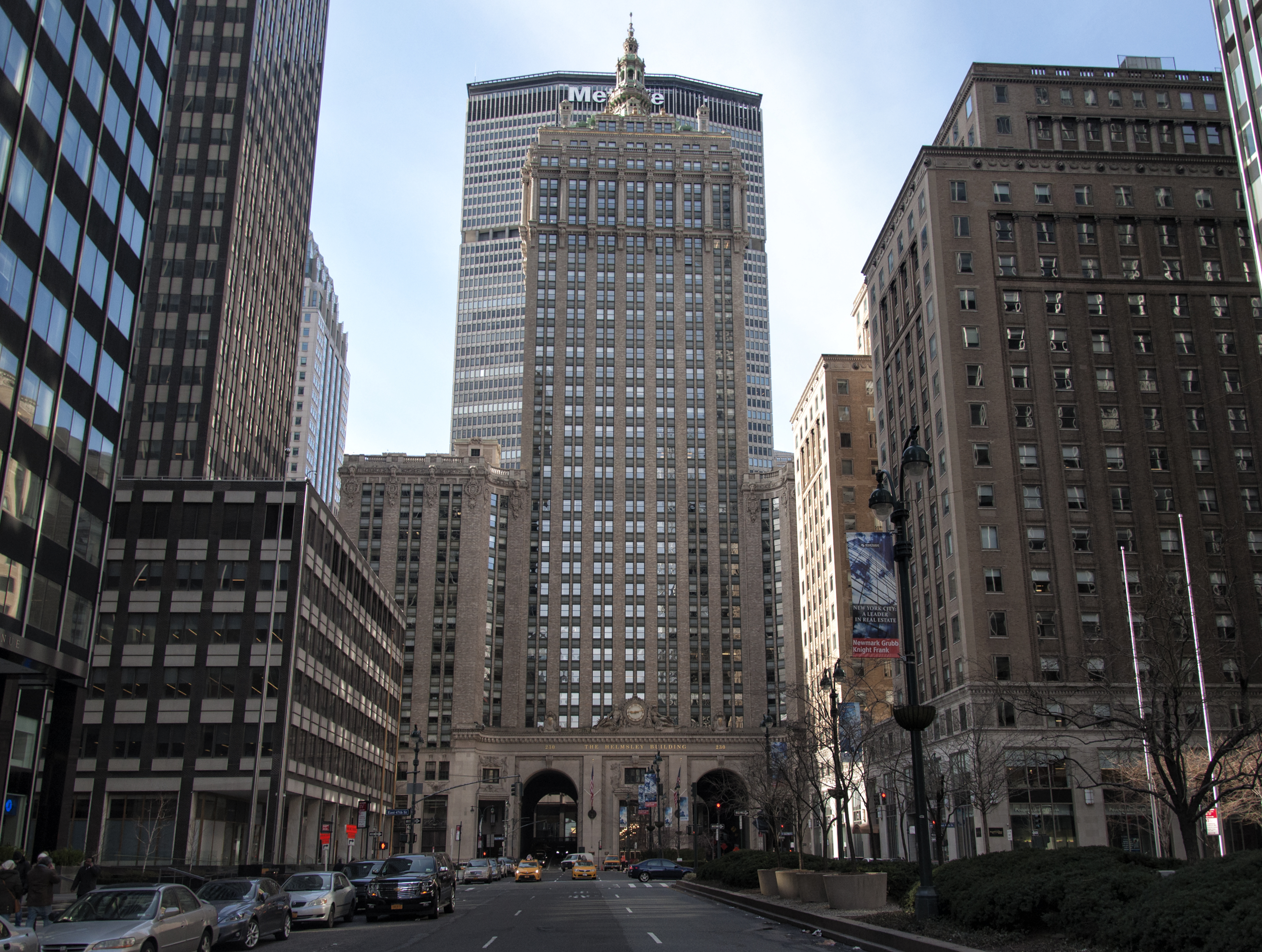
The Helmsley Building, in front of the MetLife Building, was built as part of Terminal City, a commercial and office district created above the tracks

Burying the terminal's tracks and platforms also allowed the railroads to sell above-ground air rights for real-estate development. Grand Central's construction thus produced several blocks of prime real estate in Manhattan, stretching from 42nd to 51st Streets between Madison and Lexington avenues. By the time the terminal opened in 1913, the blocks surrounding it were each valued at $2 million to $3 million. Terminal City soon became Manhattan's most desirable commercial and office district. From 1904 to 1926, land values along Park Avenue doubled, and land values in the Terminal City area increased 244%.

The district came to include office buildings such as the Chrysler Building, Chanin Building, Bowery Savings Bank Building, and Pershing Square Building; luxury apartment houses along Park Avenue; an array of high-end hotels that included the Commodore, Biltmore, Roosevelt, Marguery, Chatham, Barclay, Park Lane, and Waldorf Astoria; the Grand Central Palace; and the Yale Club of New York City. The structures immediately around Grand Central Terminal were developed shortly after the terminal's opening, while the structures along Park Avenue were constructed through the 1920s and 1930s.

The Graybar Building, completed in 1927, was one of the last projects of Terminal City. The building incorporates many of Grand Central's train platforms, as well as the Graybar Passage, a hallway with vendors and train gates stretching from the terminal to Lexington Avenue. In 1929, New York Central built its headquarters in a 34-story building, later renamed the Helmsley Building, which straddled Park Avenue north of the terminal. Development slowed drastically during the Great Depression, and part of Terminal City was gradually demolished or reconstructed with steel-and-glass designs after World War II.

The area shares similar boundaries as the Grand Central Business Improvement District, a neighborhood with businesses collectively funding improvements and maintenance in the area. The district is well-funded; in 1990 it had the largest budget of any business improvement district in the United States. The district's organization and operation is run by the Grand Central Partnership, which has given free tours of the station building. The partnership has also funded some restoration projects around the terminal, including installation of lamps to illuminate its facade and purchase of a streetlamp that used to stand on the Park Avenue Viaduct.

== Emergency services ==
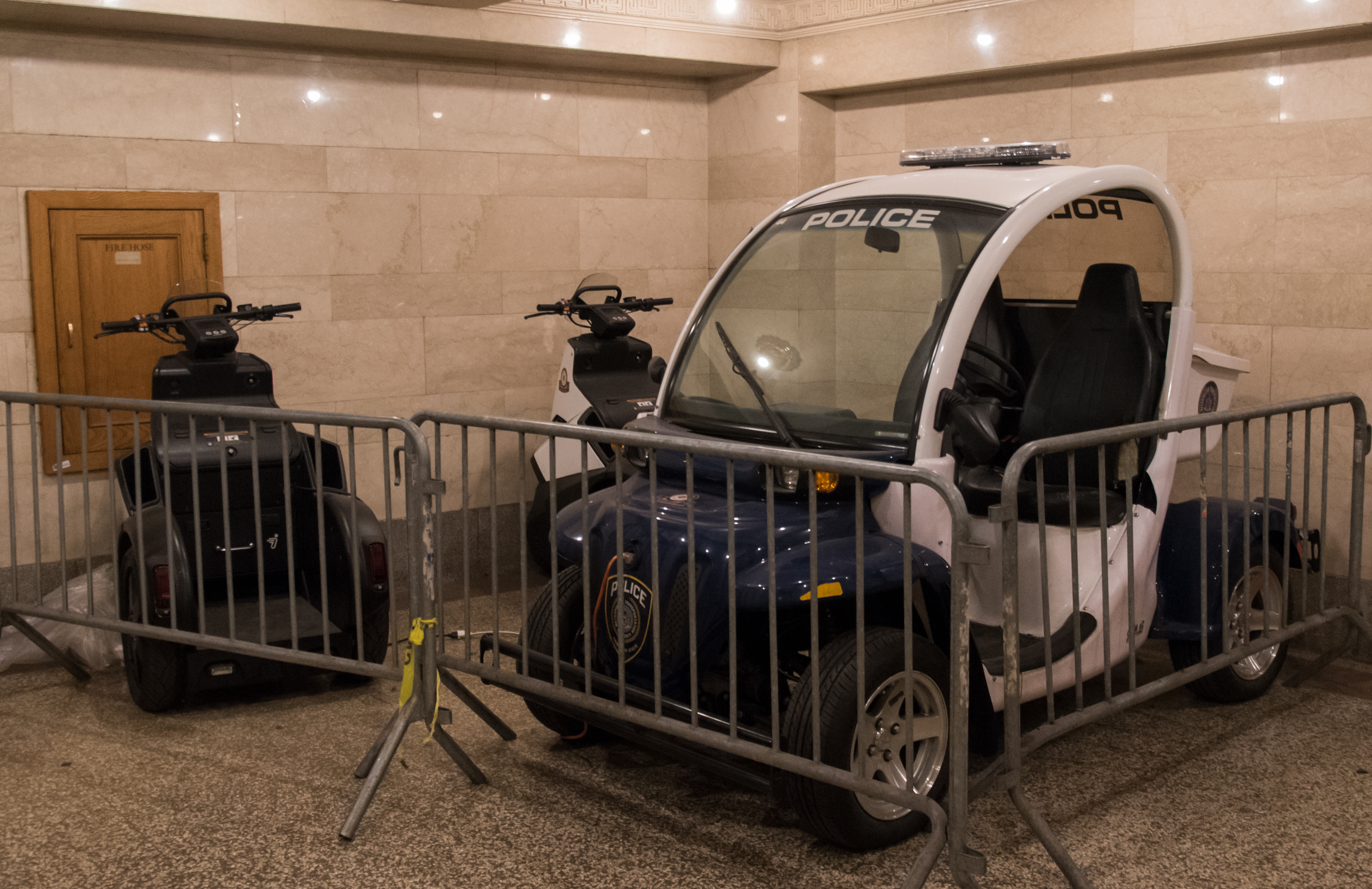
MTA Police T3 scooters and GEM electric vehicles for patrol

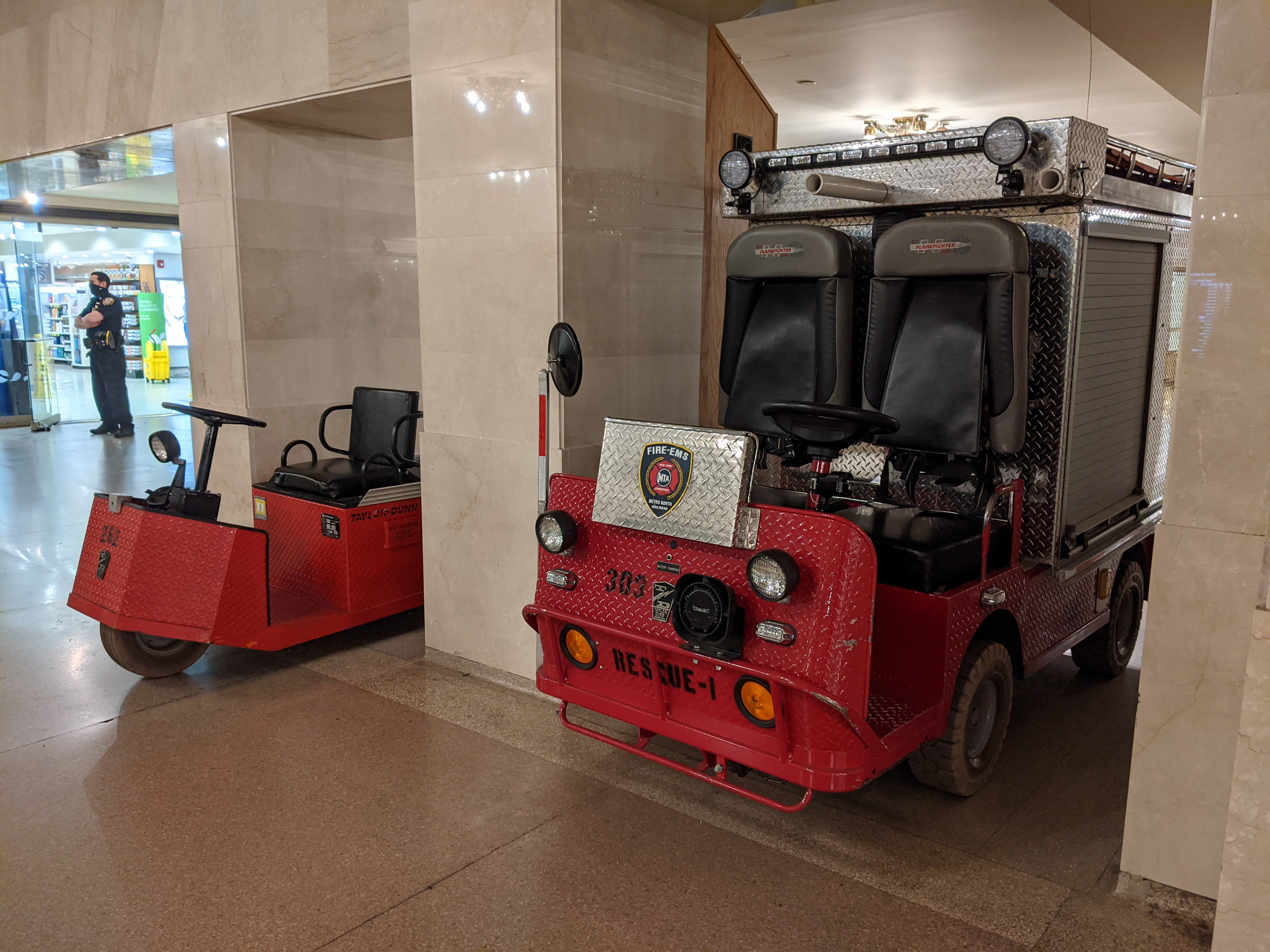
The fire brigade's Taylor-Dunn personnel carrier and rescue truck

The terminal is served by the Metropolitan Transportation Authority Police Department, whose Fifth District is headquartered in a station on the Dining Concourse. MTA officers patrol the terminal in specialized vehicles, including three-wheeled electric scooters from T3 Motion and utility vehicles by Global Electric Motorcars.

Various actions by MTA officers in the terminal have received media attention over the years. In 1988, seven officers were suspended for behaving inappropriately, including harassing a homeless man and patrolling unclothed. In the early 2000s, officers arrested two transgender people—Dean Spade in 2002 and Helena Stone in 2006—who were attempting to use restrooms aligning with their gender identities. Lawsuits forced the MTA to drop the charges and to thenceforth allow use of restrooms according to gender identity. In 2017, an officer assaulted and arrested a conductor who was removing a passenger from a train in the terminal.

Fire and medical emergency services are provided by the Metro-North Fire Brigade, a professional fire department whose members belong to the International Association of Fire Fighters union. The brigade handles 1,600 to 1,700 calls for service a year, mostly medical in nature. The brigade regularly trains the NYPD, FDNY, and MTA Police to navigate the terminal and its miles of tunnels, and trains other Metro-North employees in first aid and CPR. It also conducts fire drills and stations fire guards for special events in the terminal. Until 2007, the fire brigade was made up of volunteer Metro-North employees who received firefighting and emergency medical certification and would answer calls while on the clock for the railroad.

The brigade's fleet, stored in a bay next to Track 14, includes three electric carts equipped with red lights: a white-painted ambulance no wider than a hospital bed that carries a stretcher, oxygen tanks, defibrillators, and other medical equipment; a red pumper that carries 200 gallons of water and 300 feet of fire hose; and a red rescue truck with air packs, forcible-entry tools, and turnout gear.

== Art installations and performances ==
Among the permanent works of public art in Grand Central are the celestial ceiling in the Main Concourse, the Glory of Commerce sculptural group and the statue of Cornelius Vanderbilt decorating the building's south façade, and the two cast-iron eagle statues adorning sites around the station's exterior. Temporary works, exhibitions, and events are regularly mounted in Vanderbilt Hall, while the Dining Concourse features temporary exhibits in a series of lightboxes. The terminal is also known for its performance and installation art, including flash mobs and other spontaneous events.

== Visitors ==
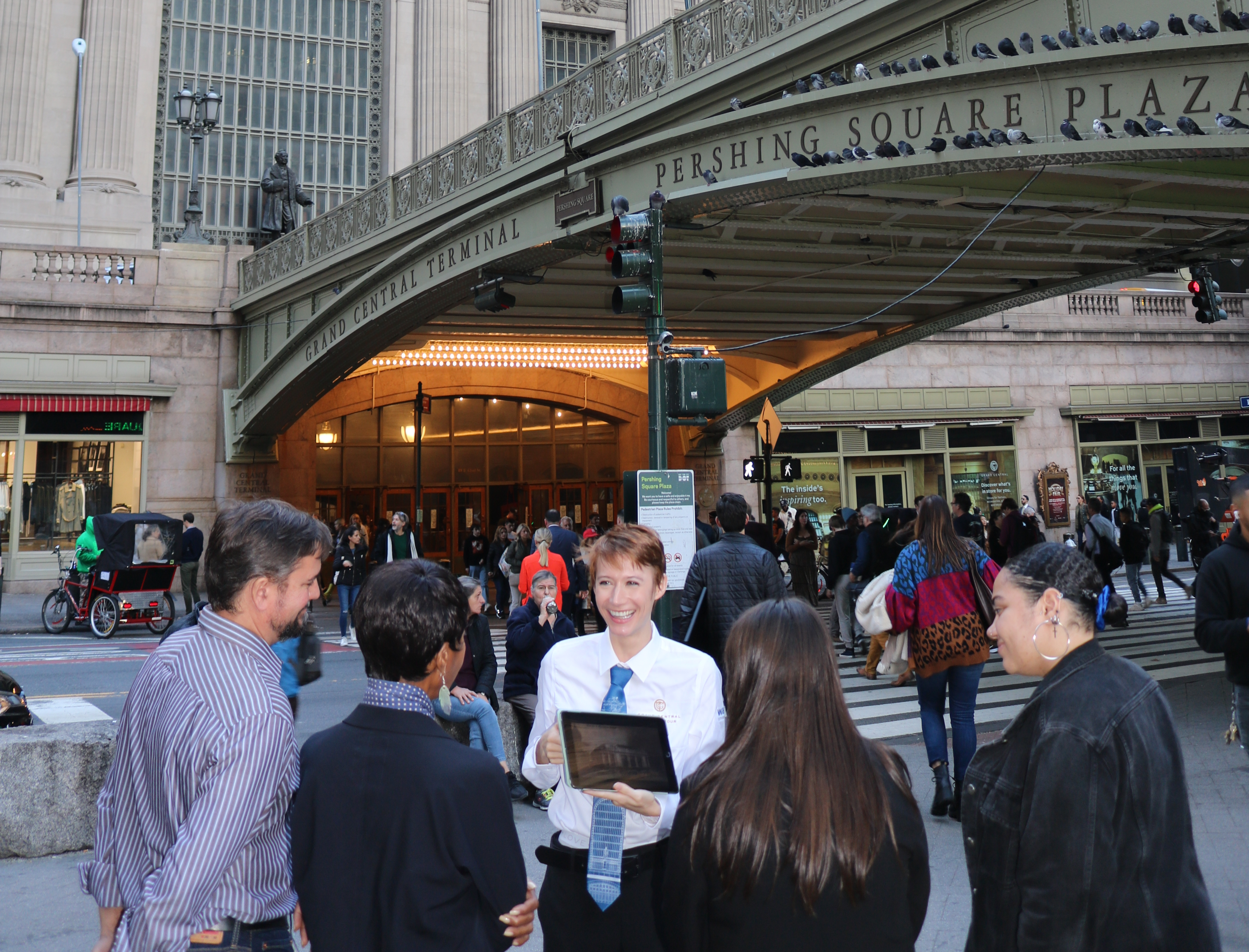
A guided tour outside the terminal, 2022

Grand Central Terminal is one of the world's ten most-visited tourist attractions, with 21.6 million visitors in 2018, excluding train and subway passengers. The high visitor traffic makes it one of the most-photographed places in New York City and the United States. A 2009 Cornell University study of geotagged photos indicated the station was the fourth-most-photographed place in New York City. Tourism to the station is not a new phenomenon; the 1900–1910 station was second to the U.S. Capitol Building in its visitor count.

In 2013, in conjunction with the terminal's centennial celebration, the Municipal Art Society began providing daily live station tours, and audio tour producer Orpheo USA began providing pre-recorded tours with headsets Tours were suspended for two years during the COVID-19 pandemic. Since late 2022, daily docent-led tours of the station have been conducted by Walks, an international tour company, by arrangement with the MTA.

Transit passenger traffic makes the terminal the third-busiest train station in North America, after New York Penn Station and Toronto Union Station. In 2018, about 67.326 million riders entered and exited at Grand Central Terminal.

== In popular culture ==
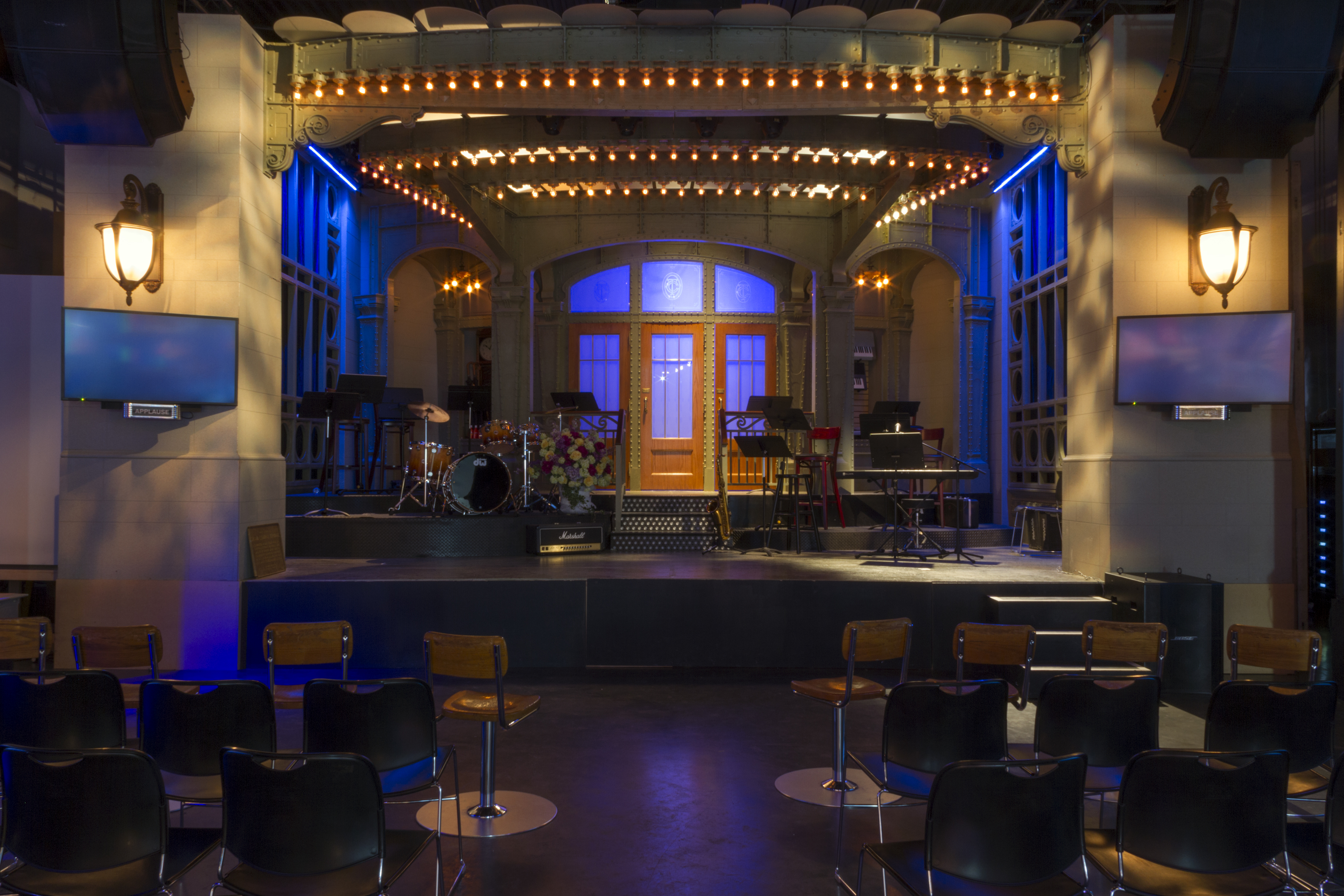
Saturday Night Live stage replica at a Museum of Broadcast Communications exhibition, 2018

Grand Central Terminal has been the subject, inspiration, or setting for literature, television and radio episodes, and films.

The MTA hosts about 25 large-scale and hundreds of smaller or amateur film and television productions every year. Grand Central has been a backdrop for romantic reunions between couples. After the terminal declined in the 1950s, it was more frequently used as a dark, dangerous place, even a metaphor for chaos and disorientation, featuring chase scenes, shootouts, homeless people, and the mentally ill. Almost every scene filmed in the terminal's train shed was shot on Track 34, one of the few platforms without structural columns blocking views.

Grand Central Terminal's architecture, including its Main Concourse clock, are depicted on the stage of Saturday Night Live, a long-running NBC television show. The soundstage reconstruction of the terminal in Studio 8H was first installed in 2003.

Notable literature featuring the terminal includes J. D. Salinger's novel The Catcher in the Rye as well as Report on Grand Central Terminal, a short story written by nuclear physicist Leo Szilard in 1948. The terminal inspired the title of Elizabeth Smart's 1945 novel By Grand Central Station I Sat Down and Wept, while its infrastructure inspired the novel The Invention of Hugo Cabret and film Hugo.

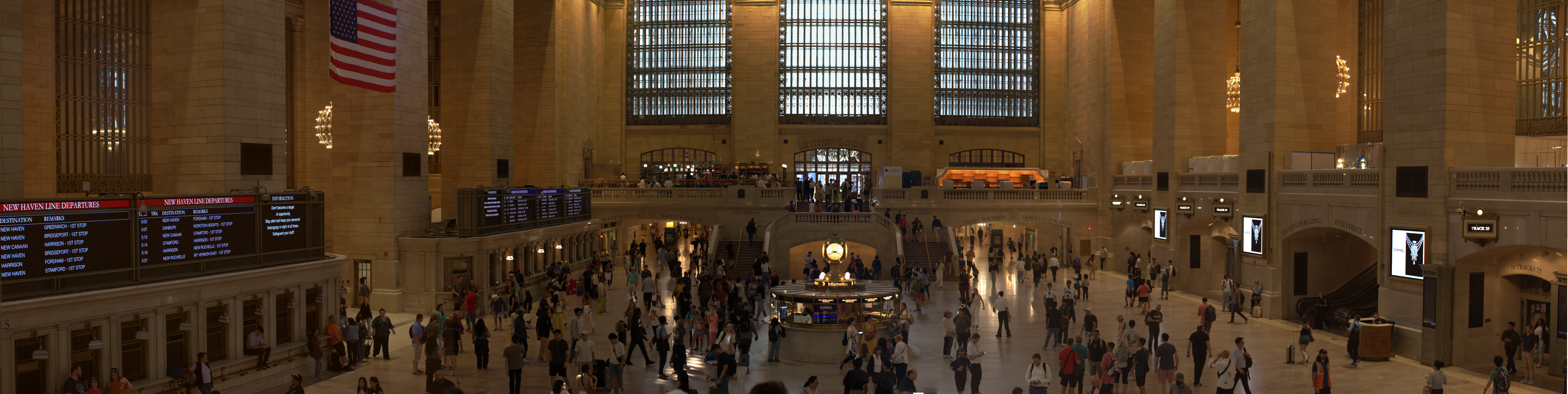
Panorama of the Main Concourse

== See also ==
- List of busiest railway stations in North America
- List of National Historic Landmarks in New York City
- List of New York City Designated Landmarks in Manhattan from 14th to 59th Streets
- National Register of Historic Places listings in Manhattan from 14th to 59th Streets
