= Transport and Human Endeavor =

1930 mural by Edward Trumbull

Transport and Human Endeavor is the mural created in 1930 by Edward Trumbull (1884–1968) on the ceiling of the lobby of the Chrysler Building in New York City. At the time of its debut, it was the largest painting in the world, at 78 by 100 feet (24 by 30 m). The work was executed on canvas and cemented on the ceiling.

The painting articulates buildings, airplanes, and portrayals of the Chrysler assembly line.
