= Cloud Club =

- Interactive map of Cloud Club

Restaurant information
- Established: 1930
- Closed: 1979
- Location: 405 Lexington Avenue, New York, New York, 10174, United States
- Coordinates: 40°45′06″N 73°58′31″W

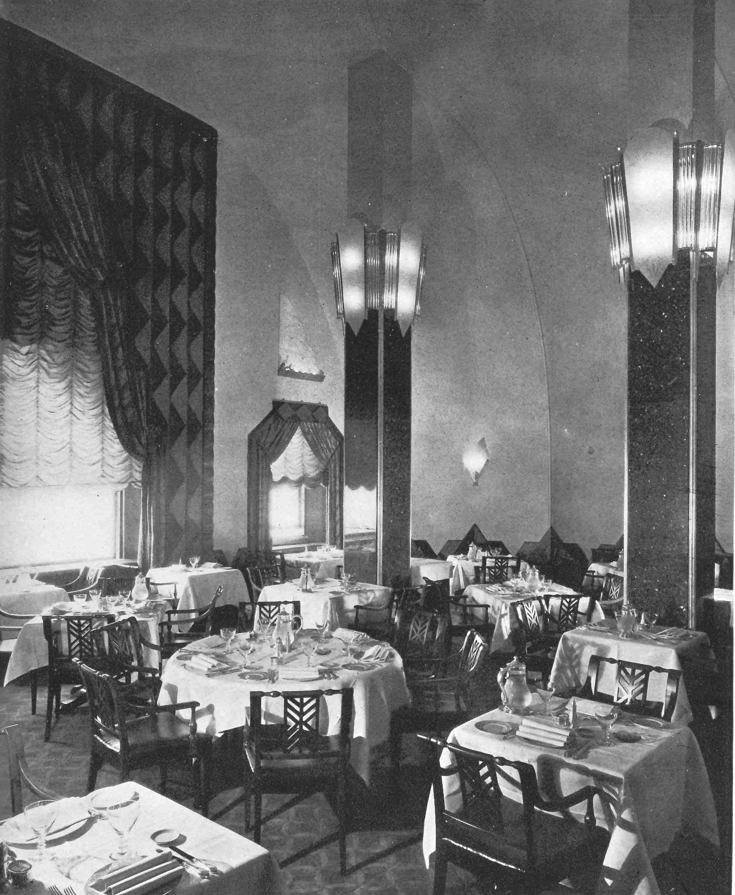
Dining Room

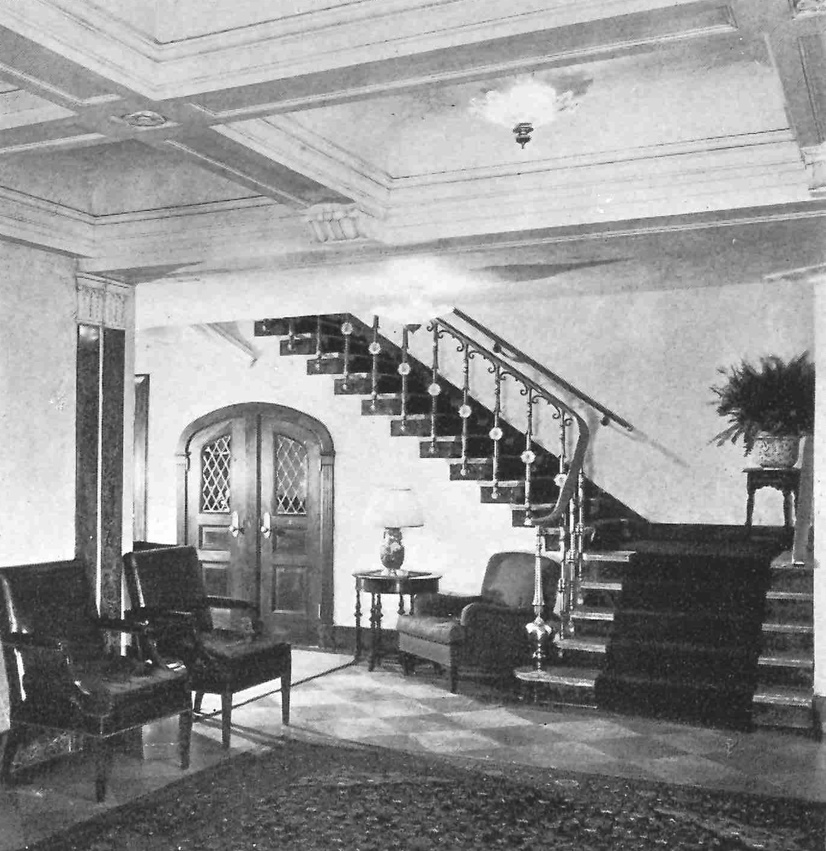
Foyer

The Cloud Club was a lunch club that occupied the 66th, 67th, and 68th floors of the Chrysler Building in New York City. At one time it was the highest lunch club in the world. It opened in 1930 and closed in 1979.

== History ==
While the Chrysler Building was under construction, Texaco, a prospective tenant, had asked that it include a restaurant for executives. The Cloud Club opened in July 1930. At the time of its opening it had 300 members. As a result of the club opening, Texaco leased fourteen floors in the new building. The club was open during daylight hours and was closed in the evening.

Many famous executives based in the tower had lunch in the club. The club was only for men for several decades. In the 1950s and 1960s newer clubs opened, causing the attendance at the Cloud Club to decrease. In 1971 180 corporations supplied 300 members of the club. The club declined more as competition from other clubs increased and as companies moved offices to suburban areas. Texaco moved its employees to Westchester, New York in 1977, and the club closed in 1979.

Tishman Speyer, which took over the Chrysler Building in 1998 and refurbished it, leased the top two floors of the Cloud Club space to tenants.

== Design ==
The building's architect, William Van Alen, and its chairman (thru the Chrysler Corporation), Walter Chrysler, had differing ideas of what the Cloud Club should be. The former had preferences for the modernist style while Chrysler had a preference for faux medieval and baronial styles. Charles McGrath of The New York Times, in 2005, wrote that the final design "reflected a somewhat uneasy compromise" between the men. Christopher Gray of The New York Times, in 1990 – when the vacant restaurant space still existed, stated that the "Cloud Club was a curious mix of historic and modern."

== Composition ==
McGrath stated that the space overall "seems almost preposterously small by today's standards" and because of all of the facilities inside it, its "backstage" areas "must have felt like a submarine - or, rather, like a very cramped airship."

The 66th floor was the point of entry into the club. Cloud motifs were used in the entry area. The pilasters and friezes were in a neo-Classical style. The bathrooms and elevator surrounds used an Art Deco style. The flooring was made of pegged planks. This floor had a bar and grill room, done in an "olde English" style, which used leaded glass doors, wood beams, chandeliers of wrought-iron, and floors in pegged planks. It also had a Tudor-style lounge decorated in oak paneling in a mortise-and-tenon style.

The main dining room, on the 67th floor, was located on the club's south side and had a capacity of 30 people. The north wall had a mural of Manhattan. The room was decorated with etched glass sconces and granite columns. The room had a view of New York City. The vaulted ceiling, in a Cathedral style, had a cloud mural. McGrath described it as having "a futuristic, Fritz Lang sort of look". A Renaissance-style staircase in marble and bronze connected the dining room with the 66th floor.

The private dining room for Walter Chrysler was located on the 67th floor. It used black etched paneling, and included an etched frieze of automobile workers. This room had a view of Central Park. There was another private dining room that was for Texaco. It included a mural of an oil refinery, the Texaco logo, and a truck. It "was reputed to be the grandest men's room in all of New York" according to McGrath. The facility also had a stock ticker room.

The service areas included a barber shop, a humidor, kitchens, and a locker room. During Prohibition alcohol was stored in cabinets in the locker room.

== Food ==
The fruit served included "No. 18" pink grapefruits, larger than supermarket grapefruits, and melons that were produced in a farm in Upstate New York owned by a club member. The most well-known dishes were bread-and-butter pudding, black bean soup, and Dover sole.

== In fiction ==
- The Cloud Club is featured in Matthew Barney's Cremaster 3.
- The Cloud Club is mentioned in the Seinfeld episode "The Voice".
- It is mentioned in the song "The Story Of The Eggs" by the New York City band Wheatus. It is from their second seasonal EP Pop, Songs & Death Vol.2: The Jupiter EP.

== Members ==
- Walter P. Chrysler
- Edward Francis Hutton
- Condé Montrose Nast
- Juan Trippe
- Gene Tunney
- Jack Frye
