= Edward Trumbull =

American painter

Edward Trumbull (1884–1968) was an American painter known primarily as a muralist.

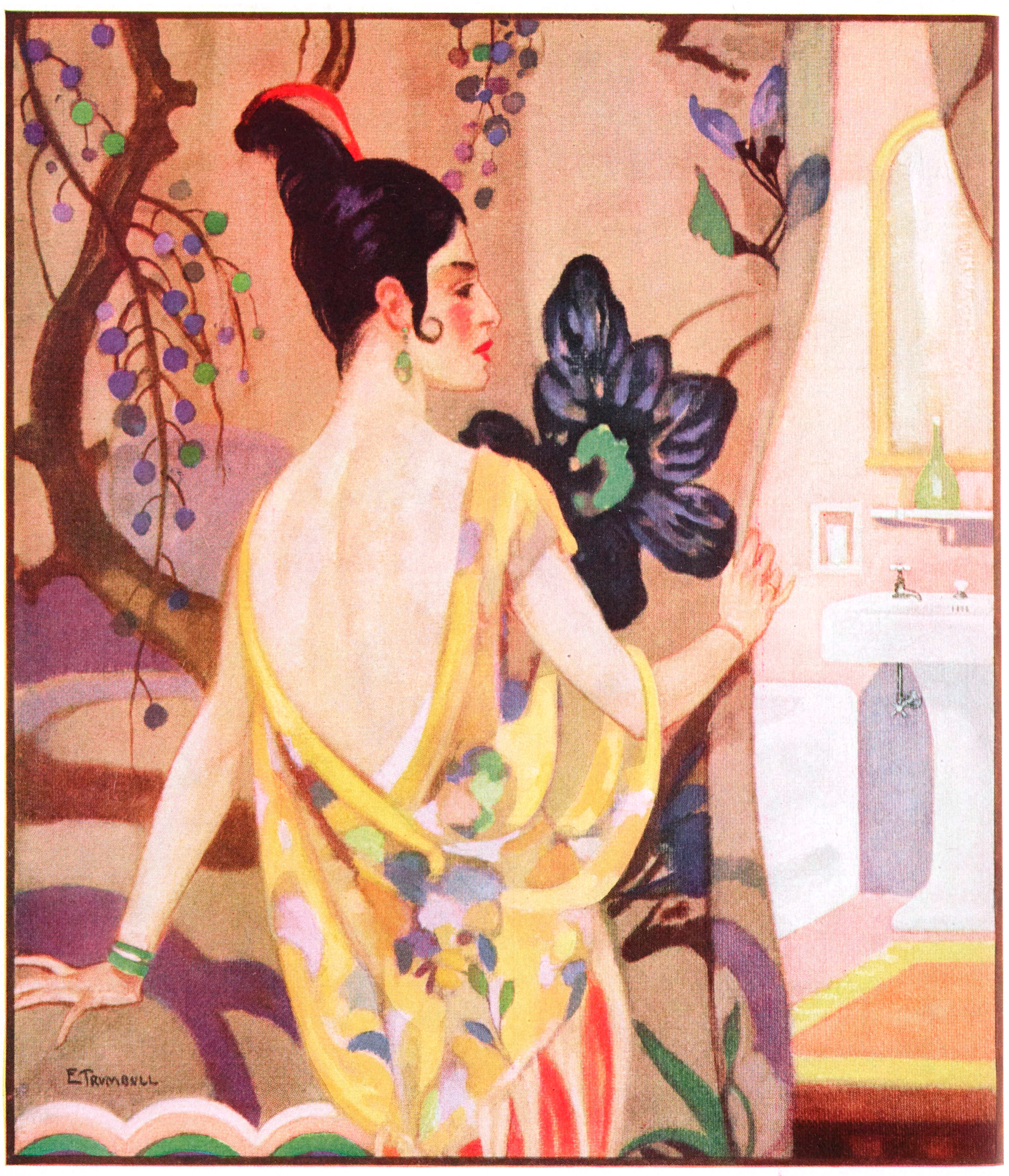
Illustration by Trumbull for an advertisement from the Standard Sanitary Mfg. Co. of Pittsburgh

== Early life ==
Edward Trumbull was born in Michigan and raised in Stonington, Connecticut. He studied at the Art Students League in New York City.

== Career ==
His next project, an Art Deco terra cotta façade bas relief on the Chanin Building was The "Graybar Passage Mural" in Grand Central Terminal (1927), rendered on one of the seven vaults. This comprised the passage's ceiling, depicting transportation. The mural "Transport and Human Endeavor" was painted on canvas and glued to the ceiling of the lobby of the Chrysler Building (1930). It was the largest ever mural painting at the time.

== Personal life and bigamy scandal ==
In 1911, Trumbull was engaged to the painter Katherine Sophie Dreier, when they both lived in London. In August 1911, he married Dreier at her home at 6 Montague Terrace in Brooklyn. Shortly after the marriage ceremony, Dreier found out that he was already married as Trumbull's existing betrothal had not come to a legal conclusion. Trumbull and Dreier's marriage was thus annulled.
