= Chrysler Building =

Office skyscraper in Manhattan, New York

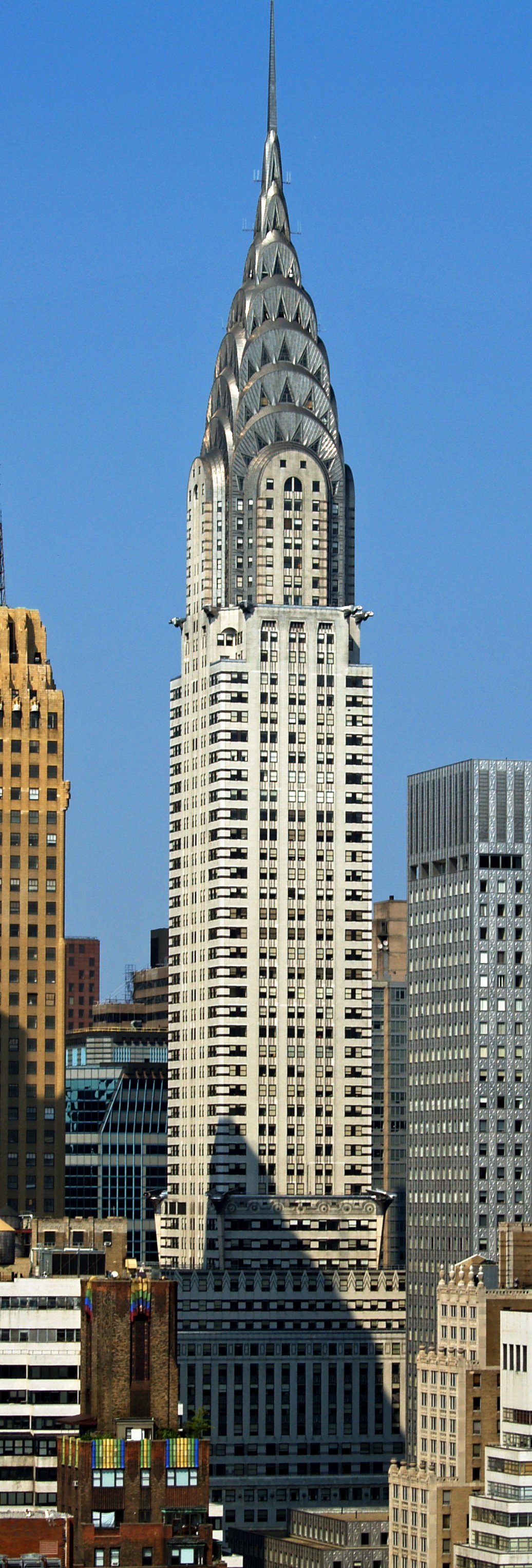
- The Chrysler Building in May 2009

Record height
- Tallest in the world from May 27, 1930 to May 1, 1931^{[I]}
- Preceded by: 40 Wall Street
- Surpassed by: Empire State Building

General information
- Type: Office building
- Architectural style: Art Deco
- Location: 405 Lexington Avenue, Manhattan, New York, US
- Coordinates: 40°45′06″N 73°58′31″W
- Construction started: January 21, 1929; 97 years ago
- Topped-out: October 23, 1929; 97 years ago
- Completed: May 27, 1930; 96 years ago
- Opened: May 27, 1930; 96 years ago
- Owner: Tishman Speyer

Height
- Antenna spire: 1,046 ft (319 m)
- Roof: 925 ft (282 m)
- Top floor: 899 ft (274 m)

Technical details
- Floor count: 77
- Floor area: 1,196,958 sq ft (111,201 m^{2})
- Lifts/elevators: 32

Design and construction
- Architect: William Van Alen
- Structural engineer: Ralph Squire & Sons
- Main contractor: Fred T Ley & Co

U.S. National Historic Landmark
- Designated: December 8, 1976
- Reference no.: 76001237

U.S. National Register of Historic Places
- Designated: December 8, 1976
- Reference no.: 76001237

New York State Register of Historic Places
- Designated: June 23, 1980
- Reference no.: 06101.001565

New York City Landmark
- Designated: September 12, 1978
- Reference no.: 0992
- Designated entity: Facade

New York City Landmark
- Designated: September 12, 1978
- Reference no.: 0996
- Designated entity: Interior: Lobby

The Chrysler Building is a 1,046-foot-tall (319 m), Art Deco-style supertall skyscraper in the East Midtown neighborhood of Manhattan, New York City, United States. Located at the intersection of 42nd Street and Lexington Avenue, it is the tallest steel-framed brick building in the world. It was both the world's first supertall skyscraper and the world's tallest building for 11 months after its completion in 1930. As of 2019, the Chrysler is the 13th-tallest building in the city, tied with The New York Times Building.

Originally a project of real estate developer and former New York State Senator William H. Reynolds, the building was commissioned by Walter Chrysler, the head of the Chrysler Corporation. The construction of the Chrysler Building, an early skyscraper, was characterized by a competition with 40 Wall Street and the Empire State Building to become the world's tallest building. The Chrysler Building was designed and funded by Walter Chrysler personally as a real estate investment for his children, but it was not intended as the Chrysler Corporation's headquarters (which was located in Detroit at the Highland Park Chrysler Plant from 1934 to 1996). An annex was completed in 1952, and the building was sold by the Chrysler family the next year, with numerous subsequent owners.

When the Chrysler Building opened, there were mixed reviews of the building's design, some calling it inane and unoriginal, others hailing it as modernist and iconic. Reviewers in the late 20th and early 21st centuries regarded the building as a paragon of the Art Deco architectural style. In 2007, it was ranked ninth on the American Institute of Architects' list of America's Favorite Architecture. The facade and interior became New York City designated landmarks in 1978, and the structure was added to the National Register of Historic Places as a National Historic Landmark in 1976.

== Site ==
The Chrysler Building is on the eastern side of Lexington Avenue between 42nd and 43rd streets in Midtown Manhattan, New York City, United States. The land was donated to The Cooper Union for the Advancement of Science and Art in 1902. The site is roughly a trapezoid with a 201-foot-long (61 m) frontage on Lexington Avenue; a 167-foot-long (51 m) frontage on 42nd Street; and a 205-foot-long (62 m) frontage on 43rd Street. The site bordered the old Boston Post Road, which predated, and ran aslant of, the Manhattan street grid established by the Commissioners' Plan of 1811. As a result, the east side of the building's base is similarly aslant. The building is assigned its own ZIP Code, 10174. It is one of 41 buildings in Manhattan that have their own ZIP Codes, as of 2019.

The Grand Hyatt New York hotel and the Graybar Building are across Lexington Avenue, while the Socony-Mobil Building is across 42nd Street. In addition, the Chanin Building is to the southwest, diagonally across Lexington Avenue and 42nd Street.

== Architecture ==
The Chrysler Building was designed by William Van Alen in the Art Deco style and is named after one of its original tenants, automotive executive Walter Chrysler. With a height of 1,046 feet (319 m), the Chrysler is the 12th-tallest building in the city as of 2019, tied with The New York Times Building. The building is constructed of a steel frame infilled with masonry, with areas of decorative metal cladding. The structure contains 3,862 exterior windows. Approximately fifty metal ornaments protrude at the building's corners on five floors reminiscent of gargoyles on Gothic cathedrals. The 31st-floor contains gargoyles as well as replicas of the 1929 Chrysler radiator caps, and the 61st-floor is adorned with eagles as a nod to America's national bird.

The design of the Chrysler Building makes extensive use of bright "Nirosta" stainless steel, an austenitic alloy developed in Germany by Krupp. It was the first use of this "18–8 stainless steel" in an American project, composed of 18% chromium and 8% nickel. Nirosta was used in the exterior ornaments, the window frames, the crown, and the needle. The steel was an integral part of Van Alen's design, as E.E. Thum explains: "The use of permanently bright metal was of greatest aid in the carrying of rising lines and the diminishing circular forms in the roof treatment, so as to accentuate the gradual upward swing until it literally dissolves into the sky...." Stainless steel producers used the Chrysler Building to evaluate the durability of the product in architecture. In 1929, the American Society for Testing Materials created an inspection committee to study its performance, which regarded the Chrysler Building as the best location to do so; a subcommittee examined the building's panels every five years until 1960, when the inspections were canceled because the panels had shown minimal deterioration.

=== Form ===
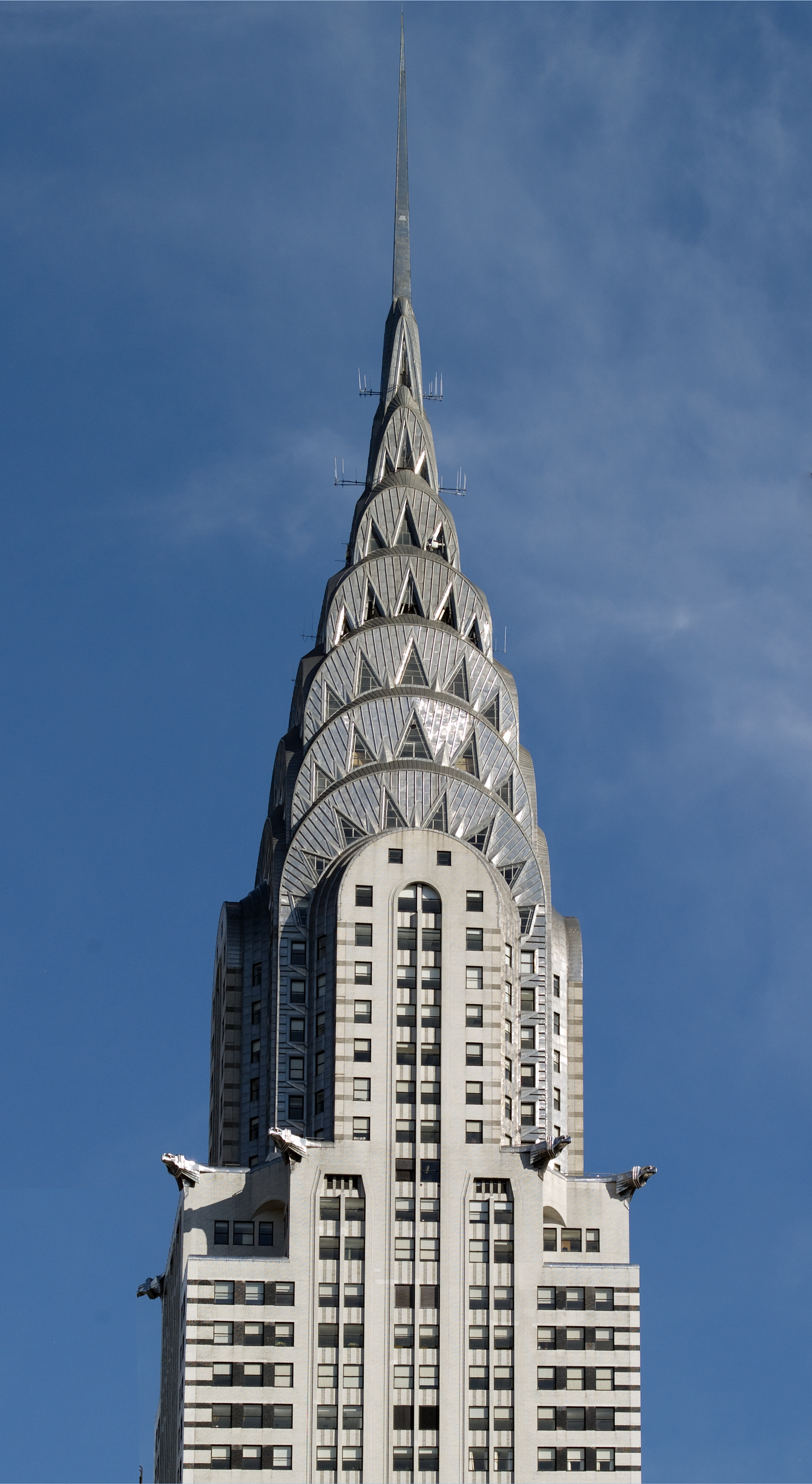
The building's distinctive Art Deco crown and spire

The Chrysler Building's height and legally mandated setbacks influenced Van Alen in his design. The walls of the lowermost sixteen floors rise directly from the sidewalk property lines, except for a recess on one side that gives the building a U-shaped floor plan above the fourth floor. There are setbacks on floors 16, 18, 23, 28, and 31, making the building compliant with the 1916 Zoning Resolution. This gives the building the appearance of a ziggurat on one side and a U-shaped palazzo on the other. Above the 31st floor, there are no more setbacks until the 60th floor, above which the structure is funneled into a Maltese cross shape that "blends the square shaft to the finial", according to author and photographer Cervin Robinson.

The floor plans of the first sixteen floors were made as large as possible to optimize the amount of rental space nearest ground level, which was seen as most desirable. The U-shaped cut above the fourth floor served as a shaft for air flow and illumination. The area between floors 28 and 31 added "visual interest to the middle of the building, preventing it from being dominated by the heavy detail of the lower floors and the eye-catching design of the finial. They provide a base to the column of the tower, effecting a transition between the blocky lower stories and the lofty shaft."

=== Facade ===
==== Base and shaft ====
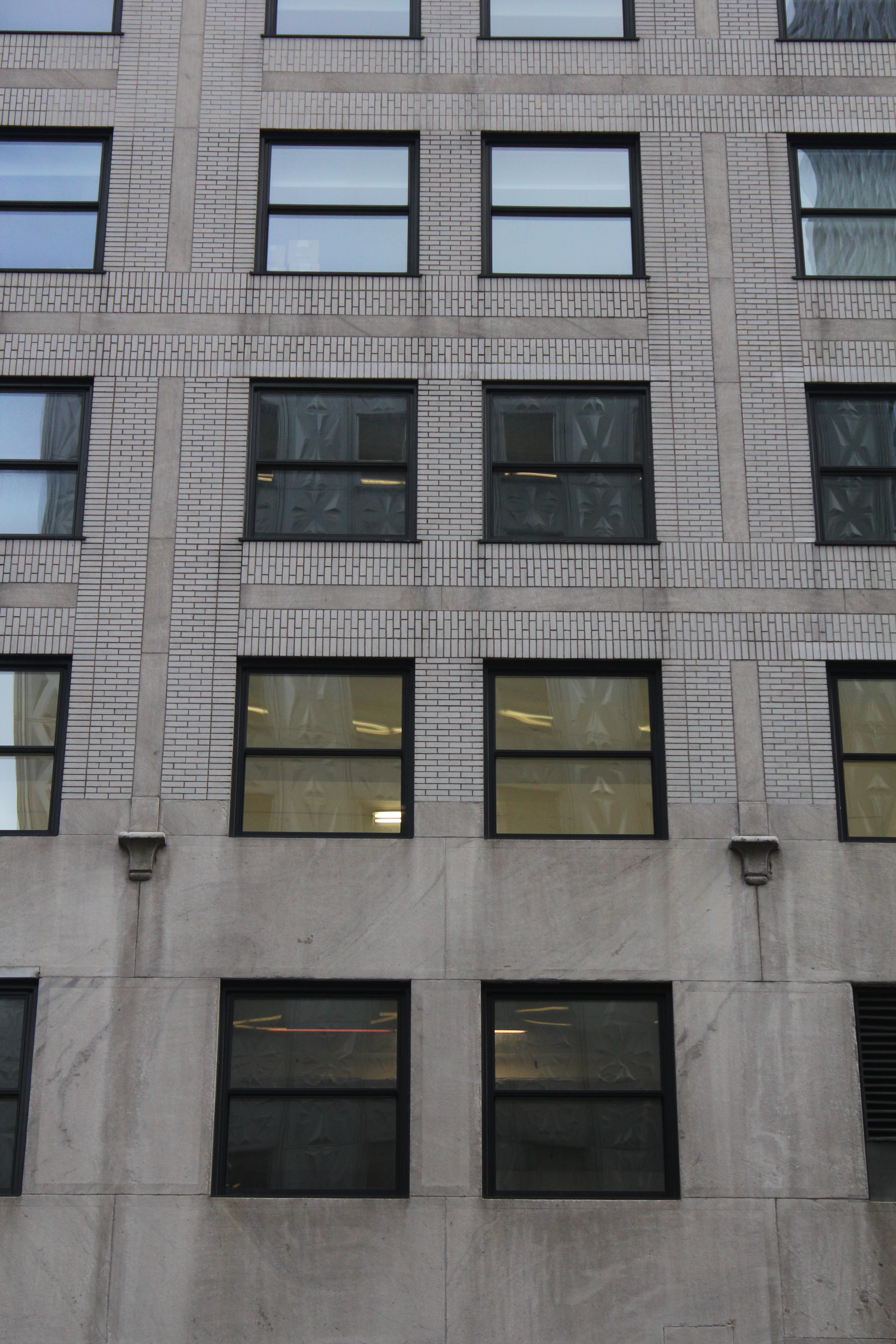
The lower walls are clad with white brick, interrupted by white-marble bands in a manner similar to a basket weaving.

The ground floor exterior is covered in polished black granite from Shastone, while the three floors above it are clad in white marble from Georgia. There are two main entrances, on Lexington Avenue and on 42nd Street, each three floors high with Shastone granite surrounding each proscenium-shaped entryway. At some distance into each main entryway, there are revolving doors "beneath intricately patterned metal and glass screens", designed so as to embody the Art Deco tenet of amplifying the entrance's visual impact. A smaller side entrance on 43rd Street is one story high. There are storefronts consisting of large Nirosta-steel-framed windows at ground level. Office windows penetrate the second through fourth floors.

The west and east elevations contain the air shafts above the fourth floor, while the north and south sides contain the receding setbacks. Below the 16th floor, the facade is clad with white brick, interrupted by white-marble bands in a manner similar to basket weaving. The inner faces of the brick walls are coated with a waterproof grout mixture measuring about 1/16 inch (1.6 mm) thick. The windows, arranged in grids, do not have window sills, the frames being flush with the facade. Between the 16th and 24th floors, the exterior exhibits vertical white brick columns that are separated by windows on each floor. This visual effect is made possible by the presence of aluminum spandrels between the columns of windows on each floor. There are abstract reliefs on the 20th through 22nd-floor spandrels, while the 24th floor contains 9-foot (2.7 m) decorative pineapples.

Above the third setback, consisting of the 24th through 27th floors, the facade contains horizontal bands and zigzagged gray-and-black brick motifs. The section above the fourth setback, between the 27th and 31st floors, serves as a podium for the main shaft of the building. There are Nirosta-steel decorations above the setbacks. At each corner of the 31st floor, large car-hood ornaments were installed to make the base look larger. These corner extensions help counter a common optical illusion seen in tall buildings with horizontal bands, whose taller floors would normally look larger. The 31st floor also contains a gray and white frieze of hubcaps and fenders, the frieze both symbolizing the Chrysler Corporation and serving as a visual signature of the building's Art Deco design. The bonnet embellishments take the shape of Mercury's winged helmet and resemble hood ornaments installed on Chrysler vehicles at the time.

The shaft of the tower was designed to emphasize both the horizontal and vertical: each of the tower's four sides contains three columns of windows, each framed by bricks and an unbroken marble pillar that rises along the entirety of each side. The spandrels separating the windows contain "alternating vertical stripes in gray and white brick", while each corner contains horizontal rows of black brick.

Ornaments resembling:

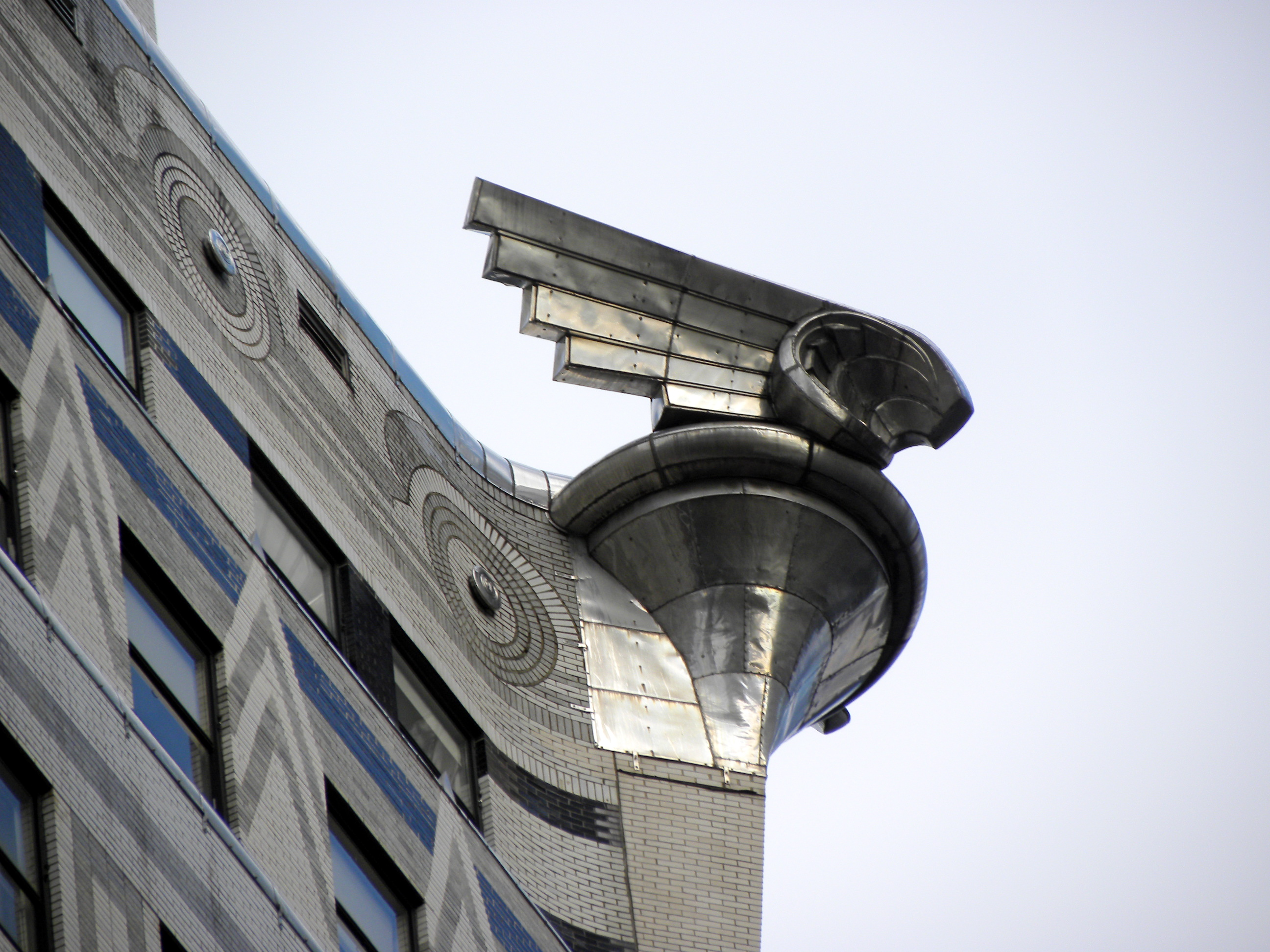
Hood ornaments
(31st floor)

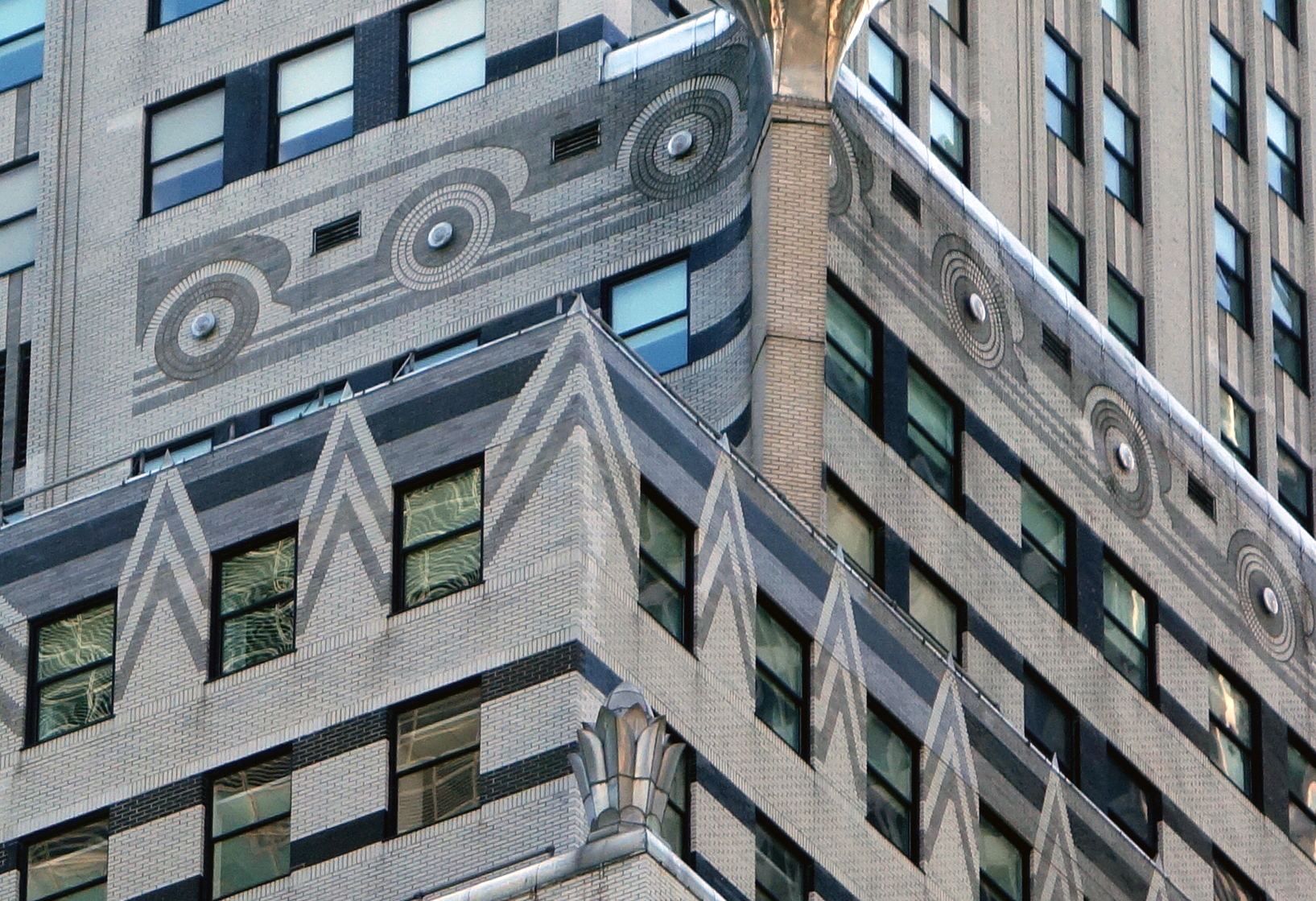
Hubcaps and fenders
(31st floor)

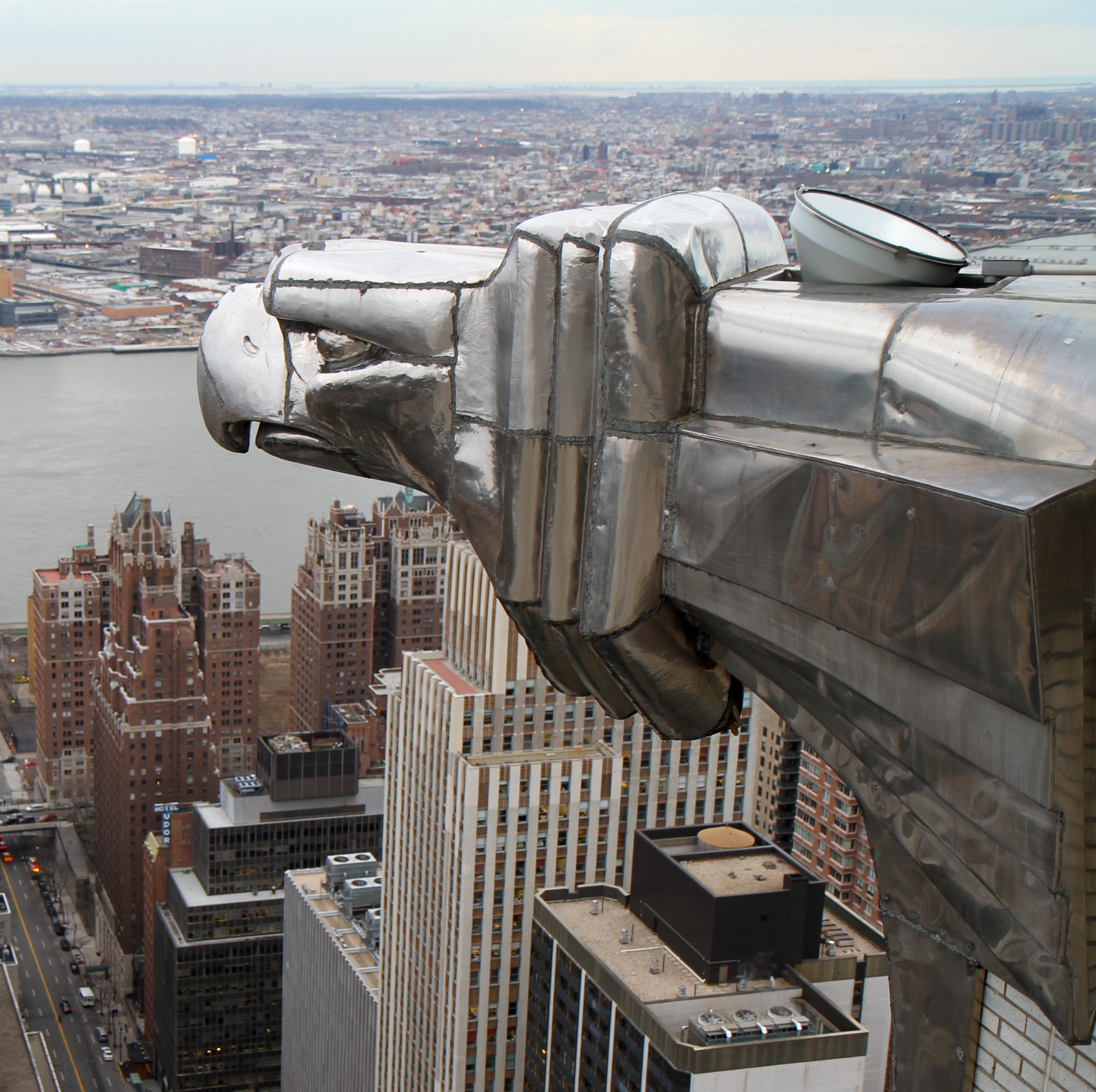
Eagles
(61st floor)

==== Crown and spire ====
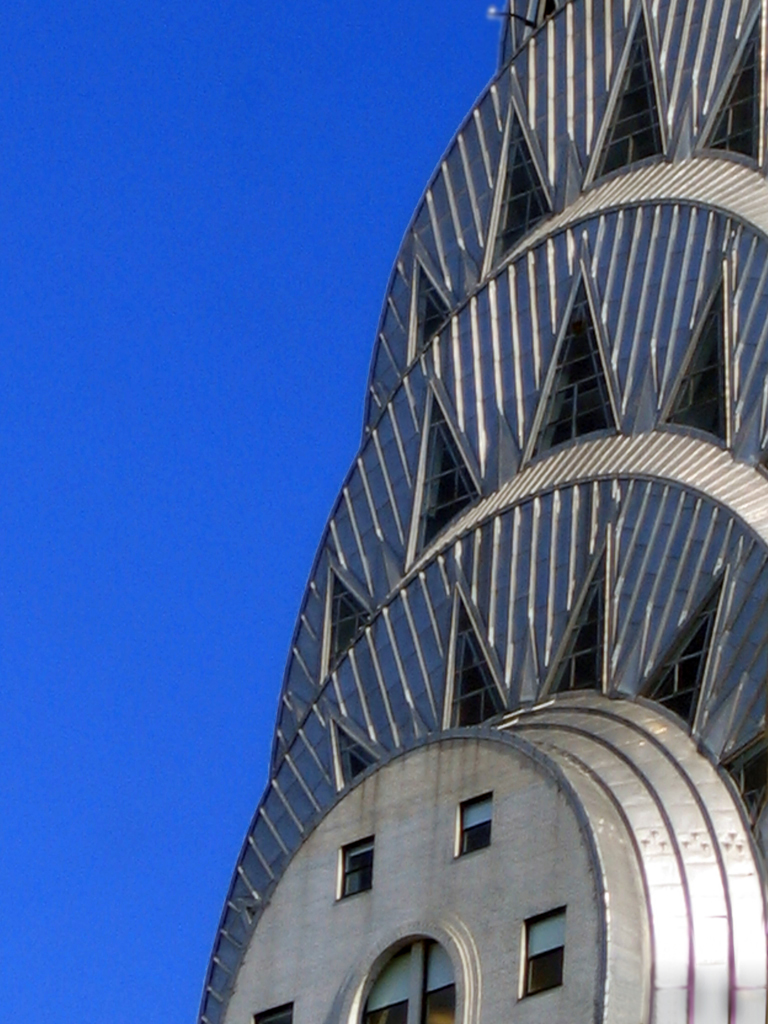
Detail of the Art Deco ornamentation at the crown

The Chrysler Building is renowned for, and recognized by its terraced crown, which is an extension of the main tower. Composed of seven radiating terraced arches, Van Alen's design of the crown is a cruciform groin vault of seven concentric members with transitioning setbacks. The entire crown is clad with Nirosta steel, ribbed and riveted in a radiating sunburst pattern with many triangular vaulted windows, reminiscent of the spokes of a wheel. The windows are repeated, in smaller form, on the terraced crown's seven narrow setbacks. Due to the curved shape of the dome, the Nirosta sheets had to be measured on site, so most of the work was carried out in workshops on the building's 67th and 75th floors. According to Robinson, the terraced crown "continue[s] the wedding-cake layering of the building itself. This concept is carried forward from the 61st floor, whose eagle gargoyles echo the treatment of the 31st, to the spire, which extends the concept of 'higher and narrower' forward to infinite height and infinitesimal width. This unique treatment emphasizes the building's height, giving it an other worldly atmosphere reminiscent of the fantastic architecture of Coney Island or the Far East."

Television station WCBS-TV (Channel 2) originated its transmission from the top of the Chrysler Building in 1938. WCBS-TV transmissions were shifted to the Empire State Building in 1951 in response to competition from RCA's transmitter on that building. For many years WPAT-FM and WTFM (now WKTU) also transmitted from the Chrysler Building, but their move to the Empire State Building by the 1970s ended commercial broadcasting from the structure.

The crown and spire are illuminated by a combination of fluorescent lights framing the crown's distinctive triangular windows and colored floodlights that face toward the building, allowing it to be lit in a variety of schemes for special occasions. The V-shaped fluorescent "tube lighting" – hundreds of 480V 40W bulbs framing 120 window openings – was added in 1981, although it had been part of the original design. Until 1998, the lights were turned off at 2 am, but The New York Observer columnist Ron Rosenbaum convinced Tishman Speyer to keep the lights on until 6 am. Since 2015, the Chrysler Building and other city skyscrapers have been part of the Audubon Society's Lights Out program, turning off their lights during bird migration seasons.

=== Interior ===
The interior of the building has several elements that were innovative when the structure was constructed. The partitions between the offices are soundproofed and divided into interchangeable sections, so the layout of any could be changed quickly and comfortably. Pipes under the floors carry both telephone and electricity cables. The topmost stories are the smallest in the building and have about 5,000 square feet (460 m^{2}) each.

==== Lobby ====
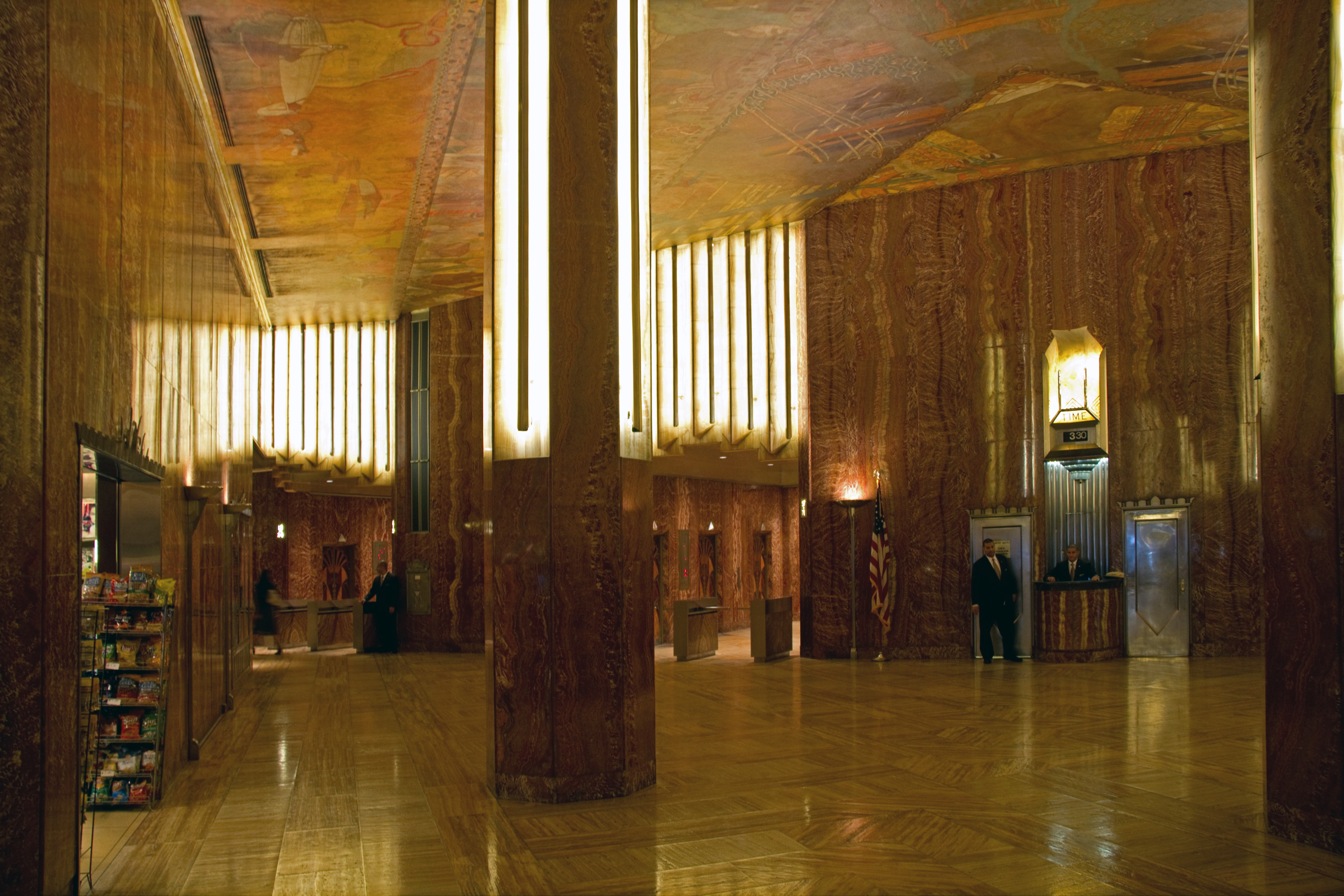
Lobby

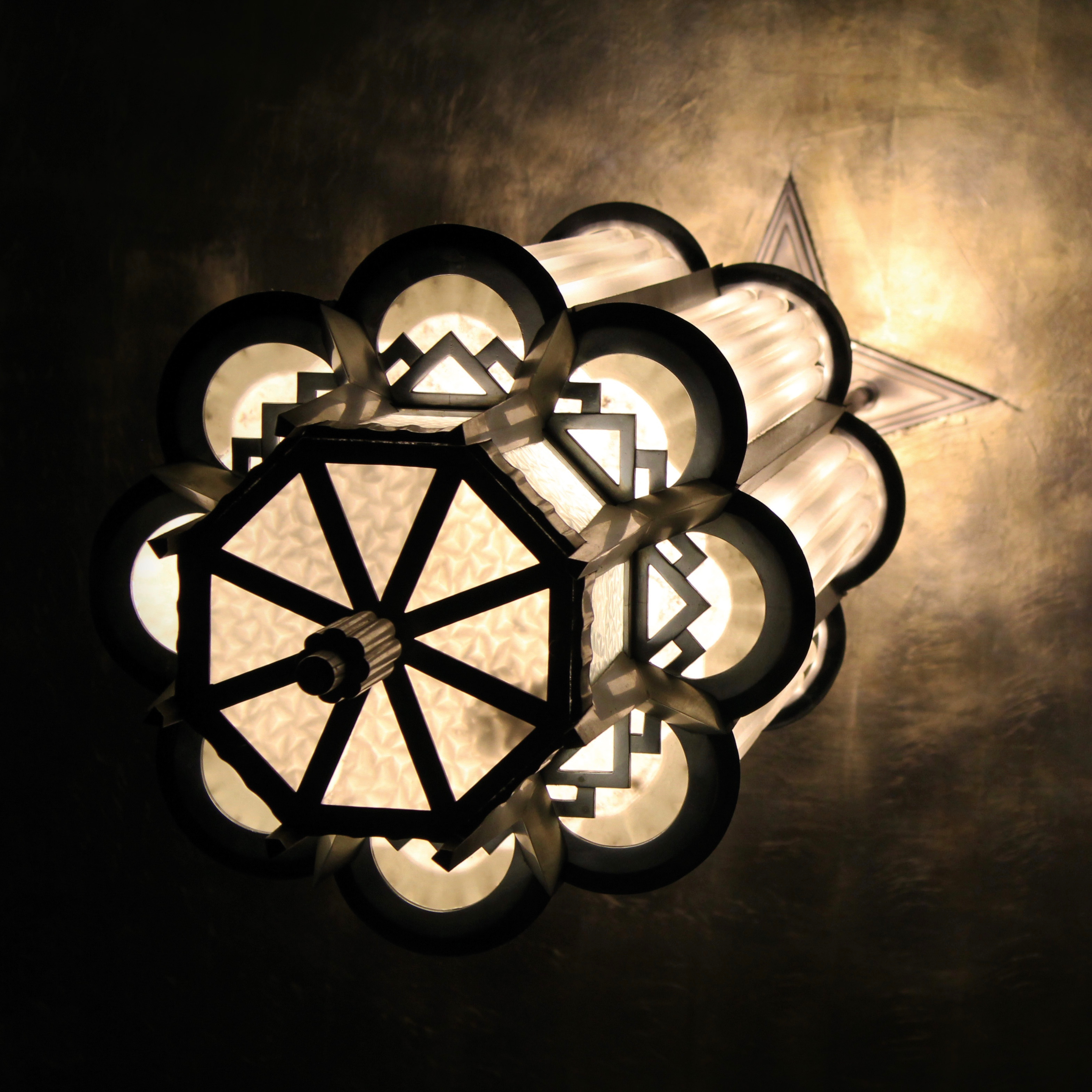
Art Deco lamp

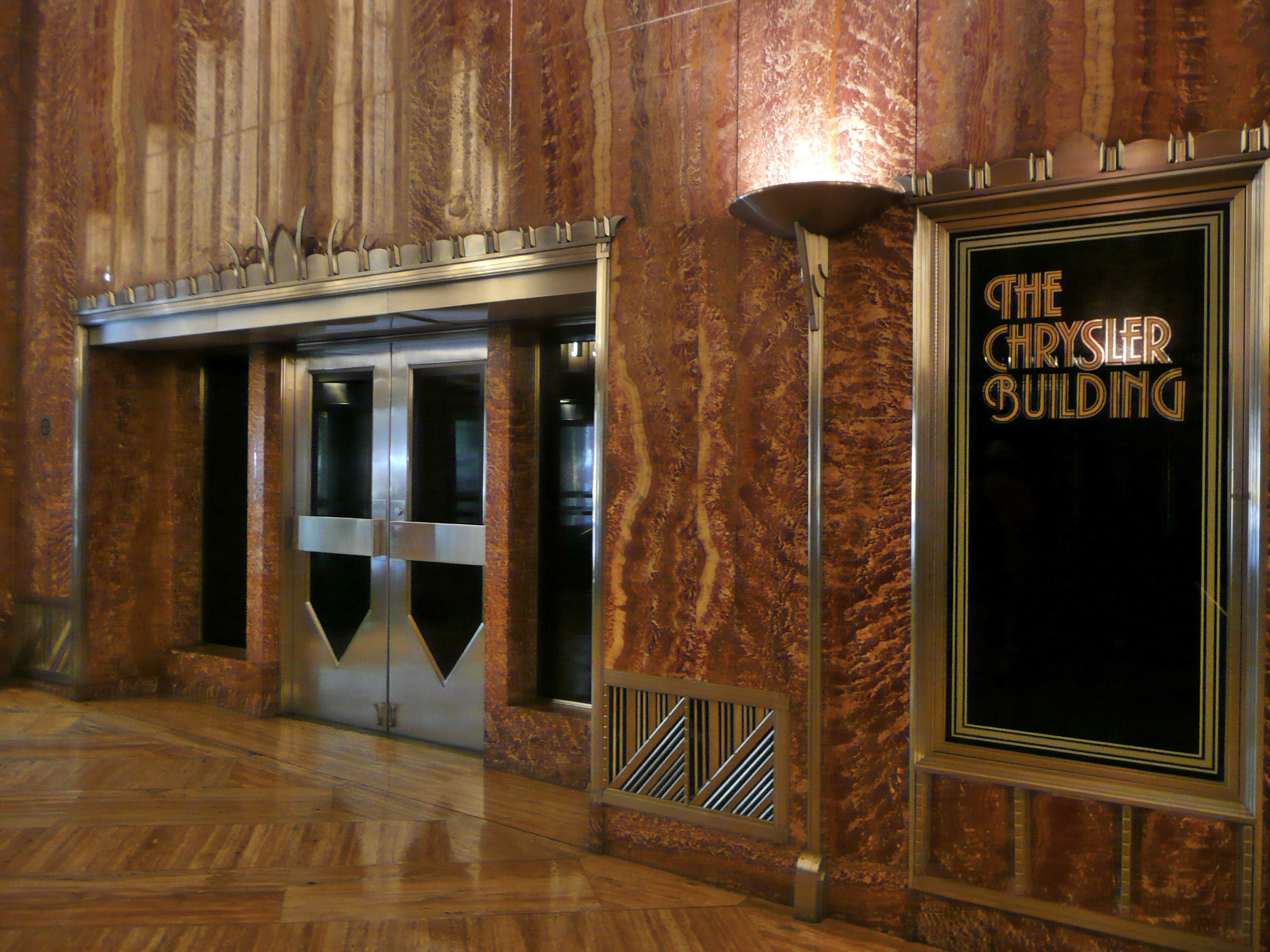
Entrance doors

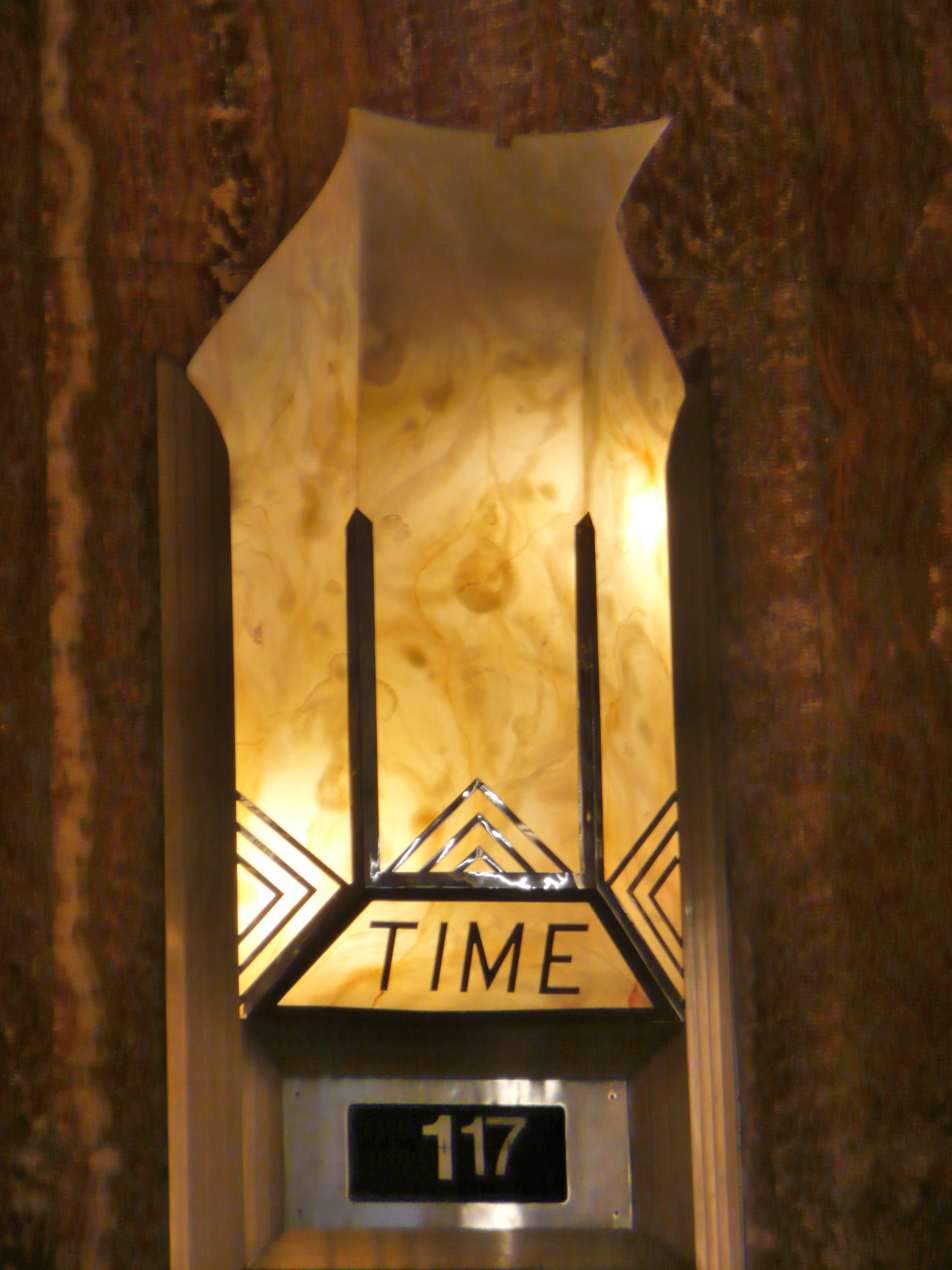
Futuristic digital clock

The lobby is triangular in plan, connecting with entrances on Lexington Avenue, 42nd Street, and 43rd Street. The lobby was the only publicly accessible part of the Chrysler Building by the 2000s. The three entrances contain Nirosta steel doors, above which are etched-glass panels that allow natural light to illuminate the space. The floors contain bands of yellow travertine from Siena, which mark the path between the entrances and elevator banks. The writer Eric Nash described the lobby as a paragon of the Art Deco style, with clear influences of German Expressionism. Chrysler wanted the design to impress other architects and automobile magnates, so he imported various materials regardless of the extra costs incurred.

The walls are covered with huge slabs of African red granite. The walls also contain storefronts and doors made of Nirosta steel. There is a wall panel dedicated to the work of clinchers, surveyors, masons, carpenters, plasterers, and builders. Fifty different figures were modeled after workers who participated in its construction. In 1999, the mural was returned to its original state after a restoration that removed the polyurethane coating and filled-in holes added in the 1970s. Originally, Van Alen's plans for the lobby included four large supporting columns, but they were removed after Chrysler objected on the grounds that the columns made the lobby appear "cramped". The lobby has dim lighting which combined with the appliqués of the lamps, create an intimate atmosphere and highlight the space. Vertical bars of fluorescent light are covered with Belgian blue marble and Mexican amber onyx bands, which soften and diffuse the light. The marble and onyx bands are designed as inverted chevrons.

Opposite the Lexington Avenue entrance is a security guard's desk topped by a digital clock. The panel behind the desk is made of marble, surrounded by Nirosta steel. The lobby connects to four elevator banks, each of a different design. To the north and south of the security desk are terrazzo staircases leading to the second floor and basement. The stairs contain marble walls and Nirosta-steel railings. The outer walls are flat but are clad with marble strips that are slightly angled to each other, which give the impression of being curved. The inner railings of each stair are designed with zigzagging Art Deco motifs, ending at red-marble newel posts on the ground story. Above each stair are aluminum-leaf ceilings with etched-glass chandeliers.

The ceiling contains a 110-by-67-foot (34 by 20 m) mural, Transport and Human Endeavor, designed by Edward Trumbull. The mural's theme is "energy and man's application of it to the solution of his problems", and it pays homage to the Golden Age of Aviation and the Machine Age. The mural is painted in the shape of a "Y" with ocher and golden tones. The central image of the mural is a "muscled giant whose brain directs his boundless energy to the attainment of the triumphs of this mechanical era", according to a 1930 pamphlet that advertised the building. The mural's Art Deco style is manifested in characteristic triangles, sharp angles, slightly curved lines, chrome ornaments, and numerous patterns. The mural depicts several silver planes, including the Spirit of St. Louis, as well as furnaces of incandescent steel and the building itself.

When the building opened, the first and second floors housed a public exhibition of Chrysler vehicles. The exhibition, known as the Chrysler Automobile Salon, was near the corner of Lexington Avenue and 42nd Streets, and opened in 1936. The ground floor featured "invisible glass" display windows, a 51-foot (16 m) diameter turntable upon which automobiles were displayed, and a ceiling with lights arranged in concentric circles. Escalators led to the showroom's second floor where Plymouths, Dodges, and DeSotos were sold. The Chrysler Salon remained operational through at least the 1960s.

==== Elevators ====
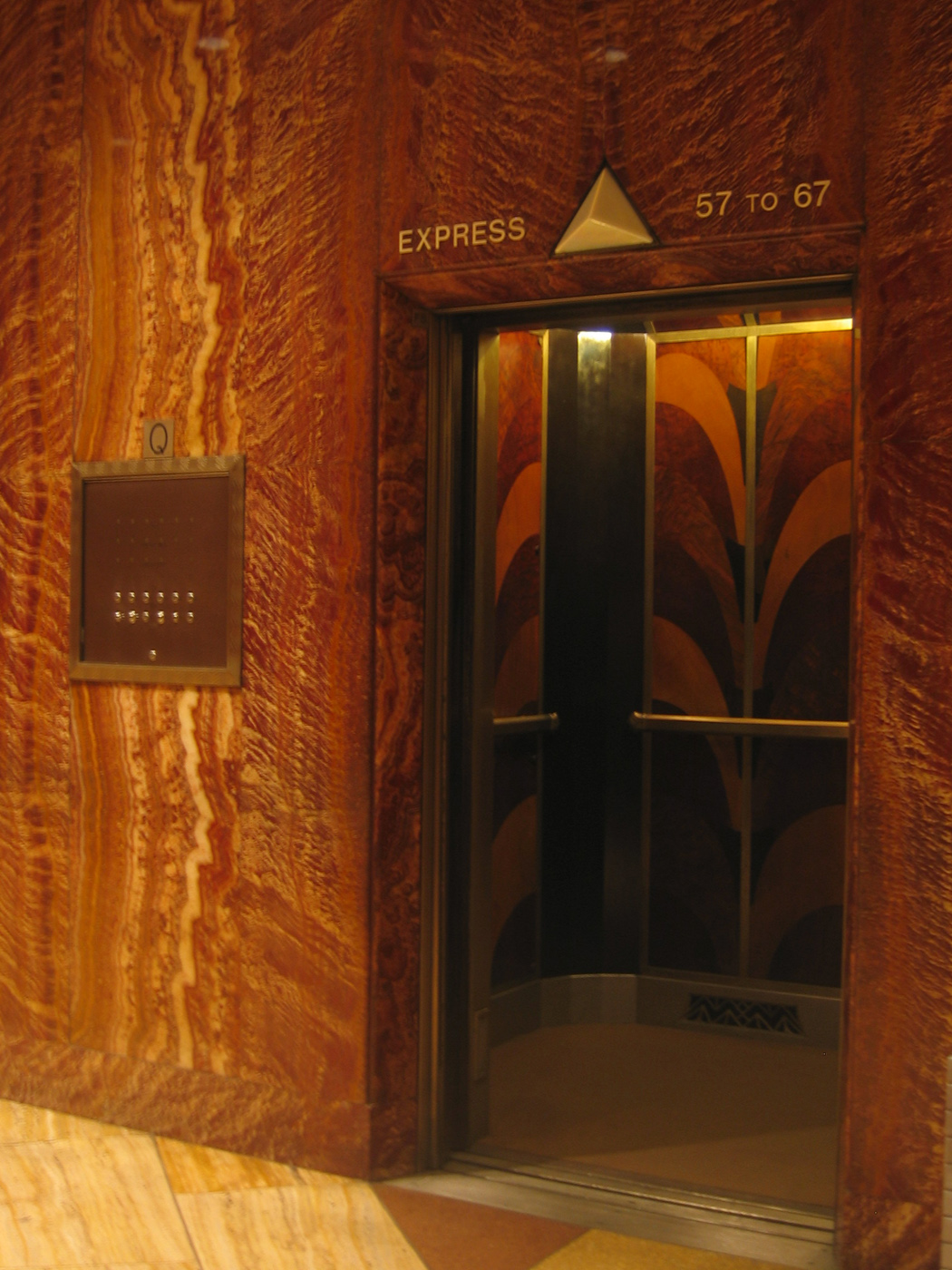
Open doors

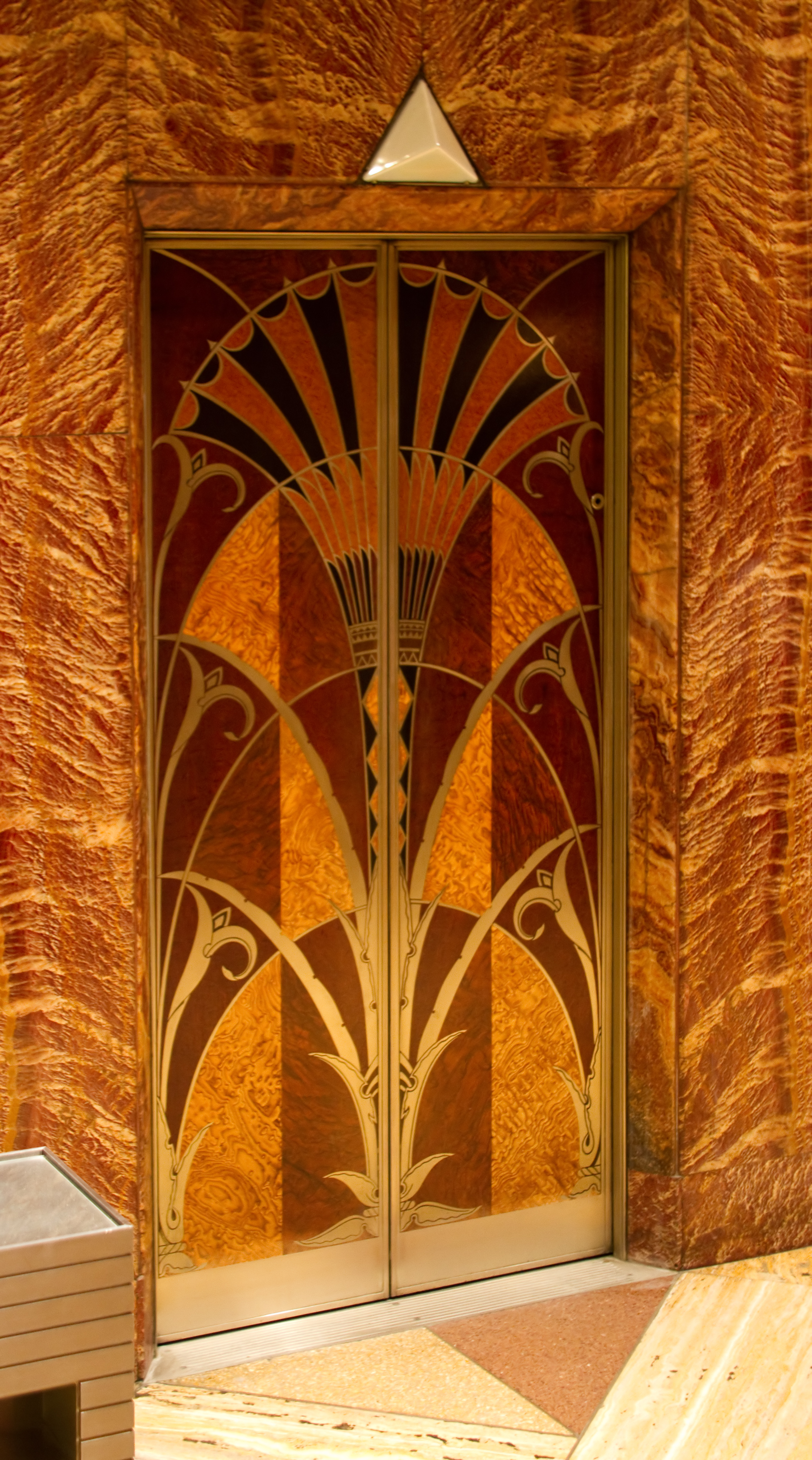
Closed doors

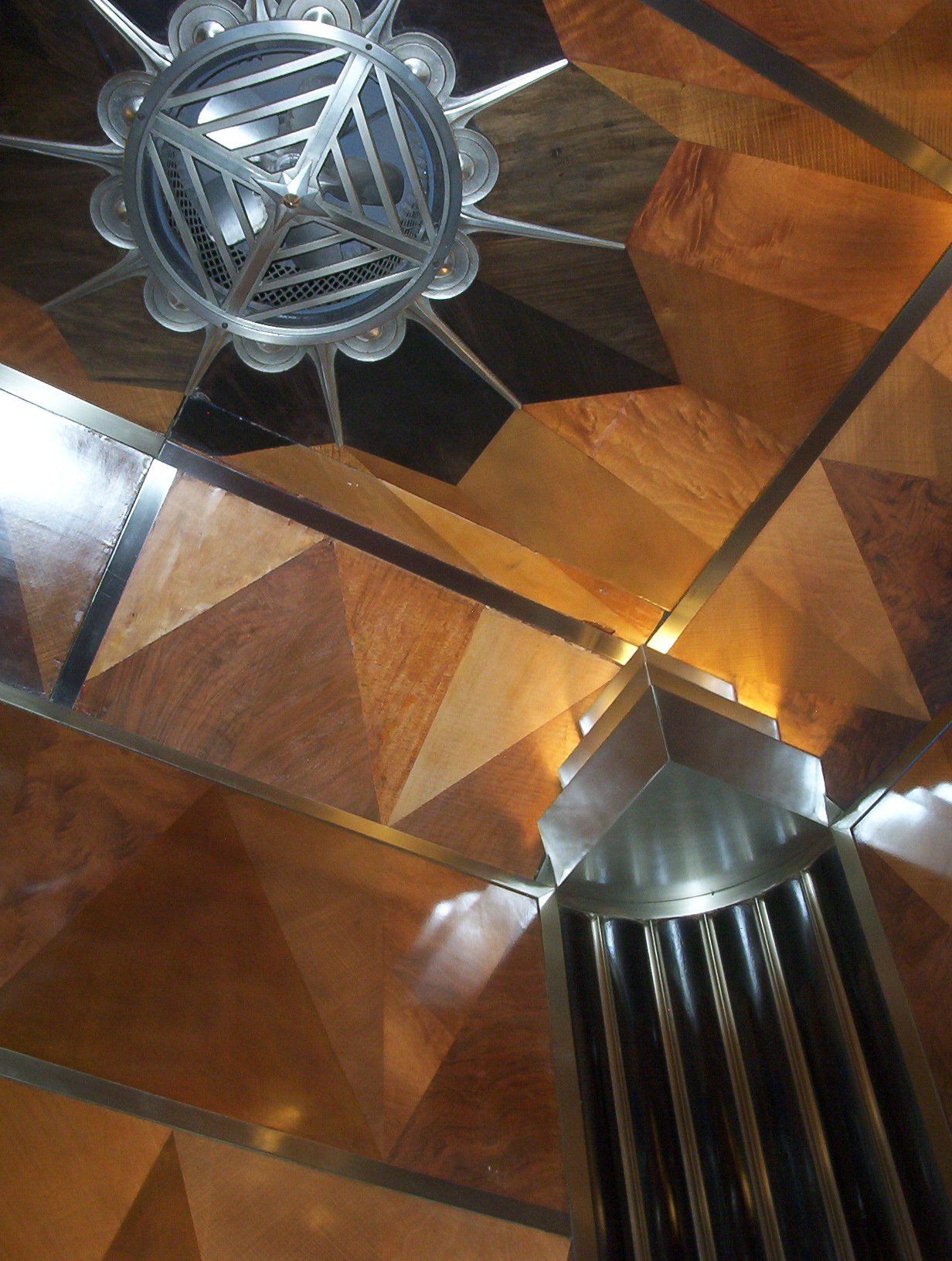
Elevator interior with inlaid wood

There are 32 elevators in the skyscraper, clustered into four banks. At the time of opening, 28 of the elevators were for passenger use. Each bank serves different floors within the building, with several "express" elevators going from the lobby to a few landings in between, while "local" elevators connect the landings with the floors above these intermediate landings. As per Walter Chrysler's wishes, the elevators were designed to run at a rate of 900 feet per minute (270 m/min), despite the 700-foot-per-minute (210 m/min) speed restriction enforced in all city elevators at the time. This restriction was loosened soon after the Empire State Building opened in 1931, as that building had also been equipped with high-speed elevators. The Chrysler Building also had three of the longest elevator shafts in the world at the time of completion.

Over the course of a year, Van Alen painstakingly designed these elevators with the assistance of L.T.M. Ralston, who was in charge of developing the elevator cabs' mechanical parts. The cabs were manufactured by the Otis Elevator Company, while the doors were made by the Tyler Company. The dimensions of each elevator were 5.5 feet (1.7 m) deep by 8 feet (2.4 m) wide. Within the lobby, there are ziggurat-shaped Mexican onyx panels above the elevator doors. The doors are designed in a lotus pattern and are clad with steel and wood. When the doors are closed, they resemble "tall fans set off by metallic palm fronds rising through a series of silver parabolas, whose edges were set off by curved lilies" from the outside, as noted by Curcio. However, when a set of doors is open, the cab behind the doors resembles "an exquisite Art Deco room". These elements were influenced by ancient Egyptian designs, which significantly impacted the Art Deco style. According to Vincent Curcio, "these elevator interiors were perhaps the single most beautiful and, next to the dome, the most important feature of the entire building."

Even though the woods in the elevator cabs were arranged in four basic patterns, each cab had a unique combination of woods. Curcio stated that "if anything in the building is based on patterned fabrics, [the elevators] certainly are. Three of the designs could be characterized as having 'geometric', 'Mexican' and vaguely 'art nouveau' motifs, which reflect the various influences on the design of the entire building." The roof of each elevator was covered with a metal plate whose design was unique to that cab, which in turn was placed on a polished wooden pattern that was also customized to the cab. Hidden behind these plates were ceiling fans. Curcio wrote that these elevators "are among the most beautiful small enclosed spaces in New York, and it is fair to say that no one who has seen or been in them has forgotten them". Curcio compared the elevators to the curtains of a Ziegfeld production, noting that each lobby contains lighting that peaks in the middle and slopes down on either side. The decoration of the cabs' interiors was also a nod to the Chrysler Corporation's vehicles: cars built during the building's early years had dashboards with wooden moldings. Both the doors and cab interiors were considered to be works of extraordinary marquetry.

==== Basement ====
On the 42nd Street side of the Chrysler Building, a staircase from the street leads directly under the building to the New York City Subway's 4, 5, 6, <6>, 7, <7>, and S trains at Grand Central–42nd Street station. It is part of the structure's original design. The Interborough Rapid Transit Company, which at the time was the operator of all the routes serving the 42nd Street station, originally sued to block construction of the new entrance because it would cause crowding, but the New York City Board of Transportation pushed to allow the corridor anyway. Chrysler eventually built and paid for the building's subway entrance. Work on the new entrance started in March 1930 and it opened along with the Chrysler Building two months later.

The basement also had a "hydrozone water bottling unit" that would filter tap water into drinkable water for the building's tenants. The drinkable water would then be bottled and shipped to higher floors.

==== Upper stories ====
===== Cloud Club =====
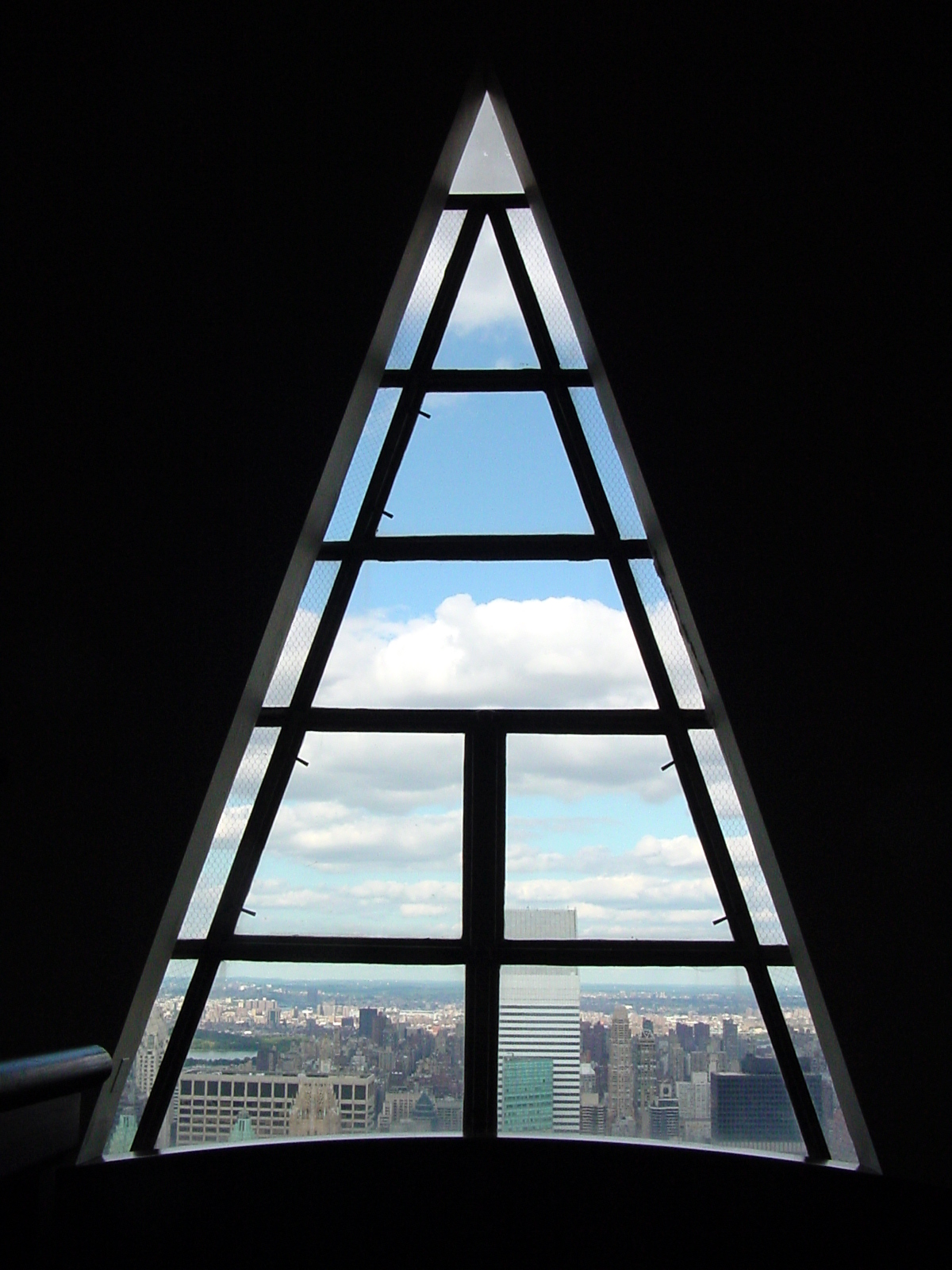
View from one of the north-facing triangular windows

The private Cloud Club formerly occupied the 66th through 68th floors. It opened in July 1930 with some three hundred members, all wealthy males who formed the city's elite. Its creation was spurred by Texaco's wish for a proper restaurant for its executives prior to renting fourteen floors in the building. The Cloud Club was a compromise between William Van Alen's modern style and Walter Chrysler's stately and traditional tastes. A member had to be elected and, if accepted, paid an initial fee of $200, plus a $150 to $300 annual fee. Texaco executives comprised most of the Cloud Club's membership. The club and its dining room may have inspired the Rockefeller Center Luncheon Club at the Rainbow Room in 30 Rockefeller Plaza.

There was a Tudor-style foyer on the 66th floor with oak paneling, as well as an old English-style grill room with wooden floors, wooden beams, wrought-iron chandeliers, and glass and lead doors. The main dining room had a futuristic appearance, with polished granite columns and etched glass appliqués in Art Deco style. There was a mural of a cloud on the ceiling and a mural of Manhattan on the dining room's north side. The 66th and 67th floors were connected by a Renaissance-style marble and bronze staircase. The 67th floor had an open bar with dark-wood paneling and furniture. On the same floor, Walter Chrysler and Texaco both had private dining rooms. Chrysler's dining room had a black and frosted-blue glass frieze of automobile workers. Texaco's dining room contained a mural across two walls; one wall depicted a town in New England with a Texaco gas station, while the other depicted an oil refinery and Texaco truck. The south side of the 67th floor also contained a library with wood-paneled walls and fluted pilasters. The 68th floor mainly contained service spaces.

In the 1950s and 1960s, members left the Cloud Club for other clubs. Texaco moved to Westchester County in 1977, and the club closed two years later. Although there have been several projects to rehabilitate the club or transform it into a disco or a gastronomic club, these plans have never materialized, as then-owner Cooke reportedly did not want a "conventional" restaurant operating within the old club. Tishman Speyer rented the top two floors of the old Cloud Club. The old staircase has been removed, as have many of the original decorations, which prompted objections from the Art Deco Society of New York.

===== Private Chrysler offices =====
Originally, Walter Chrysler had a two-story apartment on the 69th and 70th floors with a fireplace and a private office. The office also contained a gymnasium and the loftiest bathrooms in the city. The office had a medieval ambience with leaded windows, elaborate wooden doors, and heavy plaster. Chrysler did not use his gym much, instead choosing to stay at the Chrysler Corporation's headquarters in Detroit. Subsequently, the 69th and 70th floors were converted into a dental clinic. In 2005, a report by The New York Times found that one of the dentists, Charles Weiss, had operated at the clinic's current rooftop location since 1969. The office still had the suite's original bathroom and gymnasium. Chrysler also had a unit on the 58th through 60th floors, which served as his residence.

===== Observation deck and attic =====
From the building's opening until 1945, it contained a 3,900 square feet (360 m^{2}) observation deck on the 71st floor, called "Celestial". For fifty cents visitors could transit its circumference through a corridor with vaulted ceilings painted with celestial motifs and bedecked with small hanging glass planets. The center of the observatory contained the toolbox that Walter P. Chrysler used at the beginning of his career as a mechanic; it was later preserved at the Chrysler Technology Center in Auburn Hills, Michigan. An image of the building resembling a rocket hung above it. According to a contemporary brochure, views of up to 100 miles (160 km) were possible on a clear day; but the small triangular windows of the observatory created strange angles that made viewing difficult, depressing traffic. When the Empire State Building opened in 1931 with two observatories at a higher elevation, the Chrysler observatory lost its clientele. After the observatory closed, it was used to house radio and television broadcasting equipment. Since 1986, the old observatory has housed the office of architects Harvey Morse and Cowperwood Interests.

The stories above the 71st floor are designed mostly for exterior appearance, functioning mainly as landings for the stairway to the spire and do not contain office space. They are very narrow, have low and sloping roofs, and are only used to house radio transmitters and other mechanical and electrical equipment. For example, the 73rd floor houses the motors of the elevators and a 15,000-US-gallon (57,000 L) water tank, of which 3,500 US gallons (13,000 L) are reserved for extinguishing fires.

== History ==
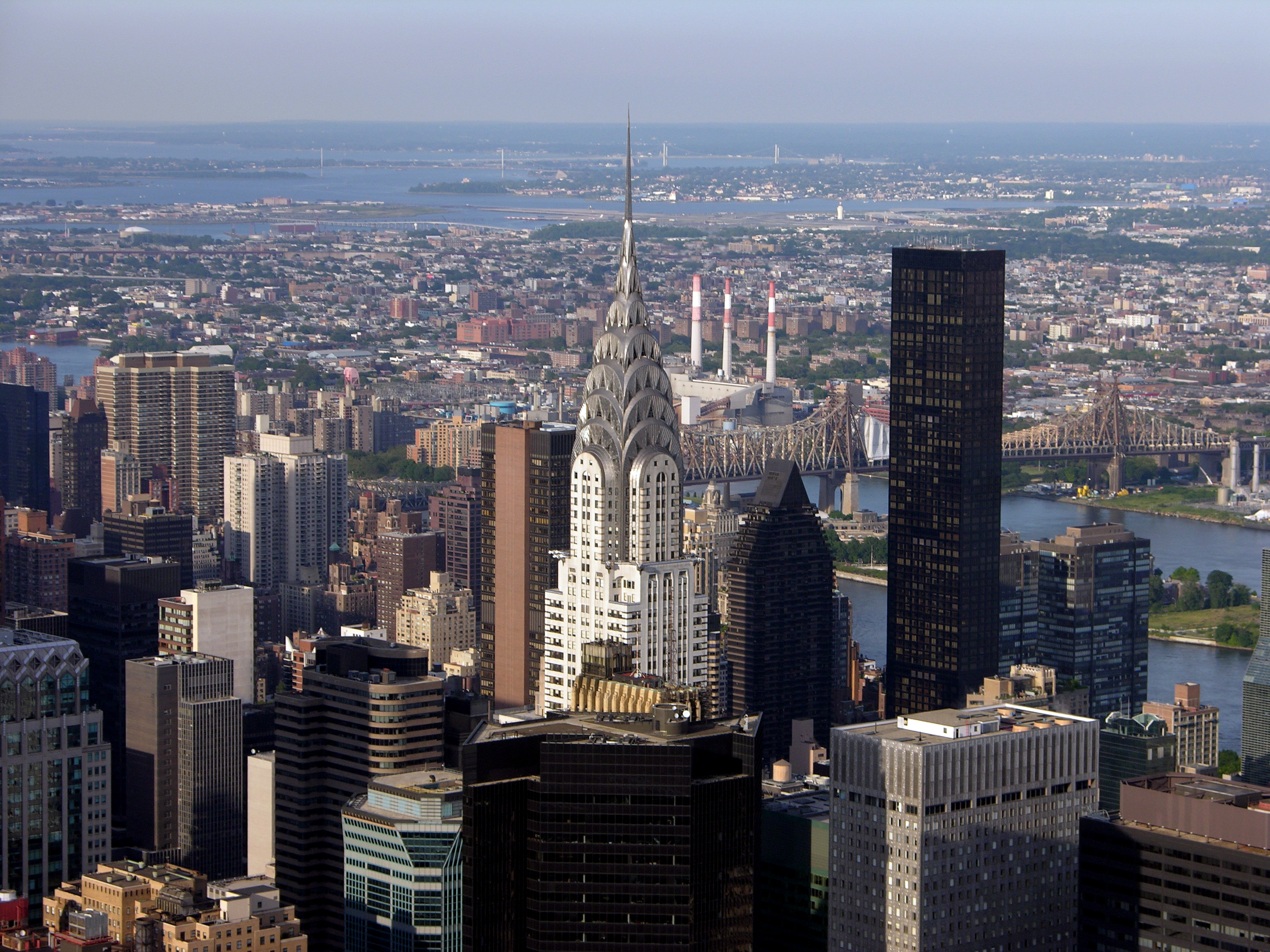
The Chrysler Building from the Empire State Building, both erected as part of New York City's 1920s building boom

In the mid-1920s, New York's metropolitan area surpassed London's as the world's most populous metropolitan area and its population exceeded ten million by the early 1930s. The era was characterized by profound social and technological changes. Consumer goods such as radio, cinema, and the automobile became widespread. In 1927, Walter Chrysler's automotive company, the Chrysler Corporation, became the third-largest car manufacturer in the United States, behind Ford and General Motors. The following year, Chrysler was named Time magazine's "Person of the Year".

The economic boom of the 1920s and speculation in the real estate market fostered a wave of new skyscraper projects in New York City. The Chrysler Building was built as part of an ongoing building boom that resulted in the city having the world's tallest building from 1908 to 1974. Following the end of World War I, European and American architects came to see simplified design as the epitome of the modern era and Art Deco skyscrapers as symbolizing progress, innovation, and modernity. The 1916 Zoning Resolution restricted the height that street-side exterior walls of New York City buildings could rise before needing to be setback from the street. (Note: As per the 1916 Zoning Act, the wall of any given tower that faces a street could only rise to a certain height, proportionate to the street's width, at which point the building had to be set back by a given proportion. This system of setbacks would continue until the tower reaches a floor level in which that level's floor area was 25% that of the ground level's area. After that 25% threshold was reached, the building could rise without restriction. This law was superseded by the 1961 Zoning Resolution.) This led to the construction of Art Deco structures in New York City with significant setbacks, large volumes, and striking silhouettes that were often elaborately decorated. Art Deco buildings were constructed for only a short period of time; but because that period was during the city's late-1920s real estate boom, the numerous skyscrapers built in the Art Deco style predominated in the city skyline, giving it the romantic quality seen in films and plays. The Chrysler Building project was shaped by these circumstances.

=== Development ===
Originally, the Chrysler Building was to be the Reynolds Building, a project of real estate developer and former New York state senator William H. Reynolds. Prior to his involvement in planning the building, Reynolds was best known for developing Coney Island's Dreamland amusement park. When the amusement park was destroyed by a fire in 1911, Reynolds turned his attention to Manhattan real estate, where he set out to build the tallest building in the world.

==== Planning ====
In 1921, Reynolds rented a large plot of land at the corner of Lexington Avenue and 42nd Street with the intention of building a tall building on the site. Reynolds did not develop the property for several years, prompting the Cooper Union to try to increase the assessed value of the property in 1924. The move, which would force Reynolds to pay more rent, was unusual because property owners usually sought to decrease their property assessments and pay fewer taxes. Reynolds hired the architect William Van Alen to design a forty-story building there in 1927. Van Alen's original design featured many Modernist stylistic elements, with glazed, curved windows at the corners.

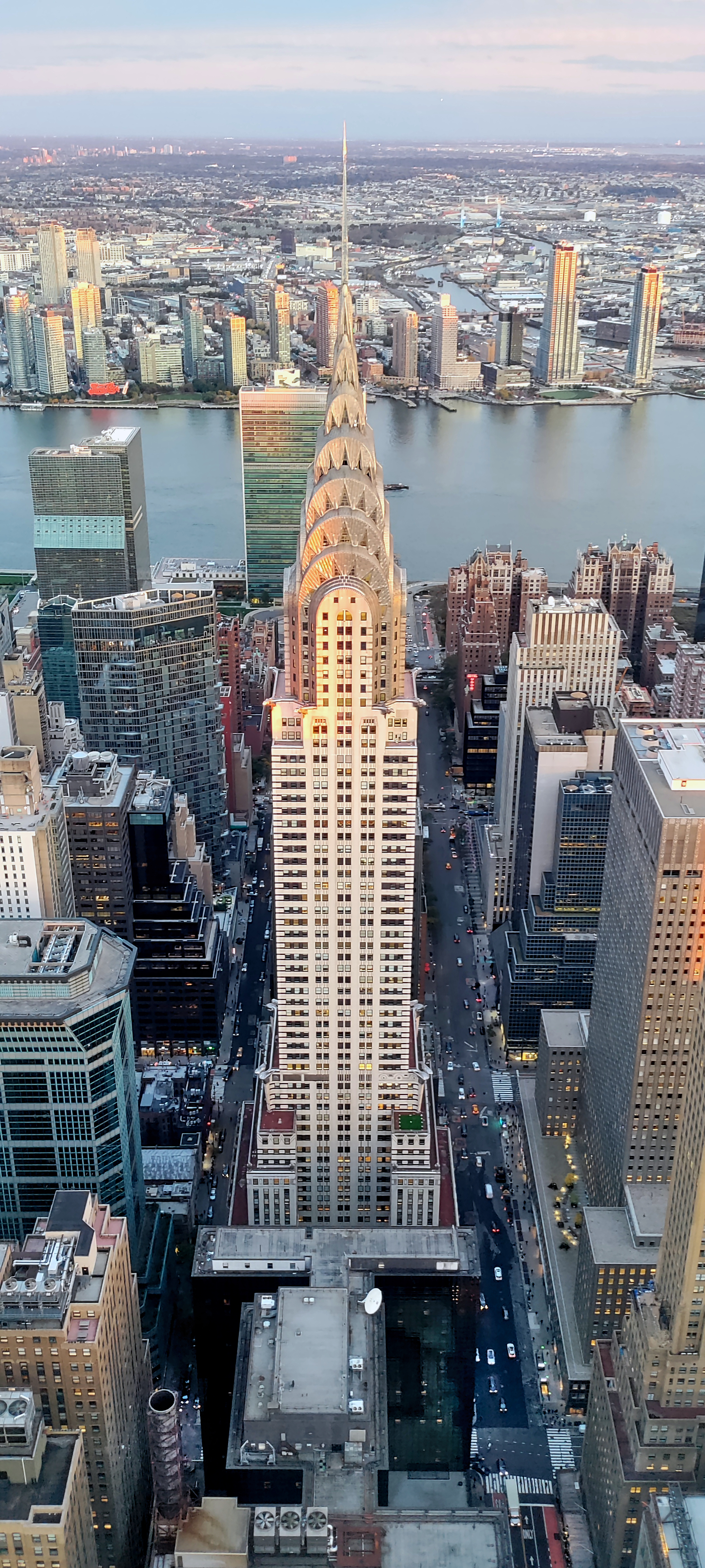
Chrysler Building from The SUMMIT at One Vanderbilt with the United Nations headquarters in the background

Van Alen was respected in his field for his work on the Albemarle Building at Broadway and 24th Street, designing it in collaboration with his partner H. Craig Severance. Van Alen and Severance complemented each other, with Van Alen being an original, imaginative architect and Severance being a shrewd businessperson who handled the firm's finances. The relationship between them became tense over disagreements on how best to run the firm. A 1924 article in the Architectural Review, praising the Albemarle Building's design, had mentioned Van Alen as the designer in the firm and ignored Severance's role. The architects' partnership dissolved acrimoniously several months later, with lawsuits over the firm's clients and assets lasting over a year. The rivalry influenced the design of the future Chrysler Building, since Severance's more traditional architectural style would otherwise have restrained Van Alen's more modern outlook.

==== Refinement of designs ====
By February 2, 1928, the proposed building's height had been increased to 54 stories, which would have made it the tallest building in Midtown. The proposal was changed again two weeks later, with official plans for a 63-story building. A little more than a week after that, the plan was changed for the third time, with two additional stories added. By this time, 42nd Street and Lexington Avenue were both hubs for construction activity, due to the removal of the Third Avenue Elevated's 42nd Street spur, which was seen as a blight on the area. The adjacent 56-story Chanin Building was also under construction. Because of the elevated spur's removal, real estate speculators believed that Lexington Avenue would become the "Broadway of the East Side", causing a ripple effect that would spur developments farther east.

In April 1928, Reynolds signed a 67-year lease for the plot and finalized the details of his ambitious project. Van Alen's original design for the skyscraper called for a base with first-floor showroom windows that would be triple-height, and above would be 12 stories with glass-wrapped corners, to create the impression that the tower was floating in mid-air. Reynolds's main contribution to the building's design was his insistence that it have a metallic crown, despite Van Alen's initial opposition; the metal-and-crystal crown would have looked like "a jeweled sphere" at night. Originally, the skyscraper would have risen 808 feet (246 m), with 67 floors. These plans were approved in June 1928. Van Alen's drawings were unveiled in the following August and published in a magazine run by the American Institute of Architects (AIA).

Reynolds ultimately devised an alternate design for the Reynolds Building, which was published in August 1928. The new design was much more conservative, with an Italianate dome that a critic compared to Governor Al Smith's bowler hat, and a brick arrangement on the upper floors that simulated windows in the corners, a detail that remains in the current Chrysler Building. This design almost exactly reflected the shape, setbacks, and the layout of the windows of the current building, but with a different dome. With the design complete, groundbreaking for the Reynolds Building took place on September 19, 1928, but by late 1928, Reynolds did not have the means to carry on construction.

==== Chrysler's plans and restart of construction ====
Walter Chrysler offered to buy the building in early October 1928, and Reynolds sold the plot, lease, plans, and architect's services to Chrysler on October 15, 1928, for more than $2.5 million. That day, the Goodwin Construction Company began demolition of what had been built. A contract was awarded on October 28, and demolition was completed on November 9. Chrysler's initial plans for the building were similar to Reynolds's, but with the 808-foot building having 68 floors instead of 67. The plans entailed a ground-floor pedestrian arcade; a facade of stone below the fifth floor and brick-and-terracotta above; and a three-story bronze-and-glass "observation dome" at the top. However, Chrysler wanted a more progressive design, and he worked with Van Alen to redesign the skyscraper to be 925 ft (282 m) tall. At the new height, Chrysler's building would be taller than the 792-foot (241 m) Woolworth Building, a building in lower Manhattan that was the world's tallest at the time. At one point, Chrysler had requested that Van Alen shorten the design by ten floors, but reneged on that decision after realizing that the increased height would also result in increased publicity.

From late 1928 to early 1929, modifications to the design of the dome continued. In March 1929, the press published details of an "artistic dome" that had the shape of a giant thirty-pointed star, which would be crowned by a sculpture five meters high. The final design of the dome included several arches and triangular windows. Lower down, various architectural details were modeled after Chrysler automobile products, such as the hood ornaments of the Plymouth (see § Facade). The building's gargoyles on the 31st floor and the eagles on the 61st floor, were created to represent flight, and to embody the machine age of the time. Even the topmost needle was built using a process similar to one Chrysler used to manufacture his cars, with precise "hand craftmanship". In his autobiography, Chrysler says he suggested that his building be taller than the Eiffel Tower.

Meanwhile, excavation of the new building's 69-foot-deep (21 m) foundation began in mid-November 1928 and was completed in mid-January 1929, when bedrock was reached. A total of 105,000,000 pounds (48,000,000 kg) of rock and 36,000,000 pounds (16,000,000 kg) of soil were excavated for the foundation, equal to 63% of the future building's weight. Construction of the building proper began on January 21, 1929. The Carnegie Steel Company provided the steel beams, the first of which was installed on March 27; and by April 9, the first upright beams had been set into place. The steel structure was "a few floors" high by June 1929, 35 floors high by early August, and completed by September. Despite a frantic steelwork construction pace of about four floors per week, no workers died during the construction of the skyscraper's steelwork. Chrysler lauded this achievement, saying, "It is the first time that any structure in the world has reached such a height, yet the entire steel construction was accomplished without loss of life". In total, 391,881 rivets were used, and approximately 3,826,000 bricks were laid to create the non-loadbearing walls of the skyscraper. Walter Chrysler personally financed the construction with his income from his car company. The Chrysler Building's height officially surpassed the Woolworth's on October 16, 1929, thereby becoming the world's tallest structure.

==== Competition for "world's tallest building" title ====
The same year that the Chrysler Building's construction started, banker George L. Ohrstrom proposed the construction of a 47-story office building at 40 Wall Street downtown, designed by Van Alen's former partner Severance. Shortly thereafter, Ohrstrom expanded his project to 60 floors, but it was still shorter than the Woolworth and Chrysler buildings. That April, Severance increased 40 Wall's height to 840 feet (260 m) with 62 floors, exceeding the Woolworth's height by 48 feet (15 m) and the Chrysler's by 32 feet (9.8 m). 40 Wall Street and the Chrysler Building started competing for the title of "world's tallest building". The Empire State Building, on 34th Street and Fifth Avenue, entered the competition in 1929. The race was defined by at least five other proposals, although only the Empire State Building would survive the Wall Street Crash of 1929. (Note: These proposals included the 100-story Metropolitan Life North Building; a 1,050-foot (320 m) tower built by Abraham E. Lefcourt at Broadway and 49th Street; a 100-story tower developed by the Fred F. French Company on Sixth Avenue between 43rd and 44th Streets; an 85-story tower to be developed on the site of the Belmont Hotel near Grand Central Terminal; and the Noyes-Schulte Company's proposed tower on Broadway between Duane and Worth Streets. Only one of these projects was even partially completed: the base of the Metropolitan Life North Building.) The "Race into the Sky", as popular media called it at the time, was representative of the country's optimism in the 1920s, which helped fuel the building boom in major cities. Van Alen expanded the Chrysler Building's height to 925 feet (282 m), prompting Severance to increase the height of 40 Wall Street to 927 feet (283 m) in April 1929. Construction of 40 Wall Street began that May and was completed twelve months later.

In response, Van Alen obtained permission for a 125-foot-long (38 m) spire. (Note: According to Robert A. M. Stern, the spire was 185 feet (56 m) long.) He had it secretly constructed inside the frame of the Chrysler Building, ensuring that Severance did not know the Chrysler Building's ultimate height until the end. The spire was delivered to the site in four sections. On October 23, 1929, one week after the Chrysler Building surpassed the Woolworth Building's height and one day before the Wall Street Crash of 1929, the spire was assembled. According to one account, "the bottom section of the spire was hoisted to the top of the building's dome and lowered into the 66th floor of the building." Then, within 90 minutes the rest of the spire's pieces were raised and riveted in sequence, raising the tower to 1,046 feet. Van Alen, who witnessed the process from the street along with its engineers and Walter Chrysler, compared the experience to watching a butterfly leaving its cocoon. In the October 1930 edition of Architectural Forum, Van Alen explained the design and construction of the crown and needle:

A high spire structure with a needle-like termination was designed to surmount the dome. This is 185 feet high and 8 feet square at its base. It was made up of four corner angles, with light angle strut and diagonal members, all told weighing 27 tons. It was manifestly impossible to assemble this structure and hoist it as a unit from the ground, and equally impossible to hoist it in sections and place them as such in their final positions. Besides, it would be more spectacular, for publicity value, to have this cloud-piercing needle appear unexpectedly.

The steel tip brought the Chrysler Building to a height of 1,046 feet (319 m), greatly exceeding 40 Wall Street's height. Contemporary news media did not write of the spire's erection, nor were there any press releases celebrating the spire's erection. Even the New York Herald Tribune, which had virtually continuous coverage of the tower's construction, did not report on the spire's installation until days after the spire had been raised.

Chrysler realized that his tower's height would exceed the Empire State Building's as well, having ordered Van Alen to change the Chrysler's original roof from a stubby Romanesque dome to the narrow steel spire. However, the Empire State's developer John J. Raskob reviewed the plans and realized that he could add five more floors and a spire of his own to his 80-story building and acquired additional plots to support that building's height extension. Two days later, the Empire State Building's co-developer, former governor Al Smith, announced the updated plans for that skyscraper, with an observation deck on the 86th-floor roof at a height of 1,050 feet (320 m), higher than the Chrysler's 71st-floor observation deck at 783 feet (239 m).

=== Completion ===
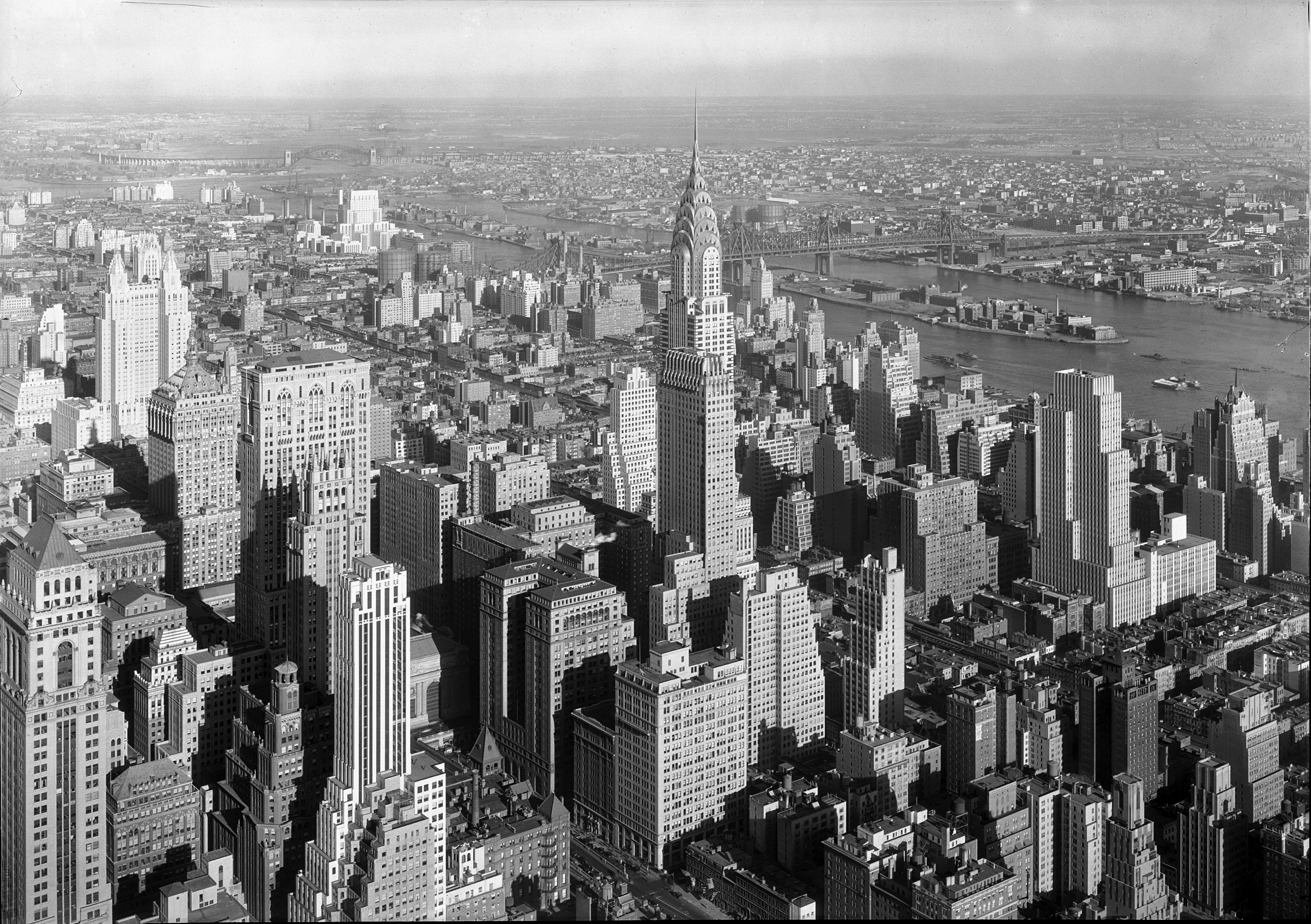
The Chrysler Building in 1932

In January 1930, it was announced that the Chrysler Corporation would maintain satellite offices in the Chrysler Building during Automobile Show Week. The skyscraper was never intended to become the Chrysler Corporation's headquarters, which remained in Detroit. The first leases by outside tenants were announced in April 1930, before the building was officially completed. The building was formally opened on May 27, 1930, in a ceremony that coincided with the 42nd Street Property Owners and Merchants Association's meeting that year. In the lobby of the building, a bronze plaque that read "in recognition of Mr. Chrysler's contribution to civic advancement" was unveiled. Former Governor Smith, former Assemblyman Martin G. McCue, and 42nd Street Association president George W. Sweeney were among those in attendance. By June, it was reported that 65% of the available space had been leased. By August, the building was declared complete, but the New York City Department of Construction did not mark it as finished until February 1932.

The added height of the spire allowed the Chrysler Building to surpass 40 Wall Street as the tallest building in the world and the Eiffel Tower as the tallest structure. The Chrysler Building was thus the first man-made structure to be taller than 1,000 feet (300 m) and, by extension, the world's first supertall skyscraper. As one newspaper noted, the tower was also taller than the highest points of five states. The tower remained the world's tallest for 11 months after its completion. The Chrysler Building was appraised at $14 million, but was exempt from city taxes per an 1859 law that gave tax exemptions to sites owned by the Cooper Union. The city had attempted to repeal the tax exemption, but Cooper Union had opposed that measure. Because the Chrysler Building retains the tax exemption, it has paid Cooper Union for the use of their land since opening. While the Chrysler Corporation was a tenant, it was not involved in the construction or ownership of the Chrysler Building; rather, the tower was a project of Walter P. Chrysler for his children. In his autobiography, Chrysler wrote that he wanted to erect the building "so that his sons would have something to be responsible for".

Van Alen's satisfaction at these accomplishments was likely muted by Walter Chrysler's later refusal to pay the balance of his architectural fee. Chrysler alleged that Van Alen had received bribes from suppliers, and Van Alen had not signed any contracts with Walter Chrysler when he took over the project. Van Alen sued and the courts ruled in his favor, requiring Chrysler to pay Van Alen $840,000, or six percent of the total budget of the building. However, the lawsuit against Chrysler markedly diminished Van Alen's reputation as an architect, which, along with the effects of the Great Depression and negative criticism, ended up ruining his career. Van Alen ended his career as professor of sculpture at the nearby Beaux-Arts Institute of Design and died in 1954. According to author Neal Bascomb, "The Chrysler Building was his greatest accomplishment, and the one that guaranteed his obscurity."

The Chrysler Building's distinction as the world's tallest building was short-lived. John Raskob realized the 1,050-foot Empire State Building would only be 4 feet (1.2 m) taller than the Chrysler Building, and Raskob was afraid that Walter Chrysler might try to "pull a trick like hiding a rod in the spire and then sticking it up at the last minute." Another revision brought the Empire State Building's roof to 1,250 feet (380 m), making it the tallest building in the world by far when it opened on May 1, 1931. However, the Chrysler Building is still the world's tallest steel-framed brick building. The Chrysler Building fared better commercially than the Empire State Building did: by 1935, the Chrysler had already rented 70 percent of its floor area. By contrast, Empire State had only leased 23 percent of its space and was popularly derided as the "Empty State Building".

=== Use ===
==== 1940s to 1960s ====
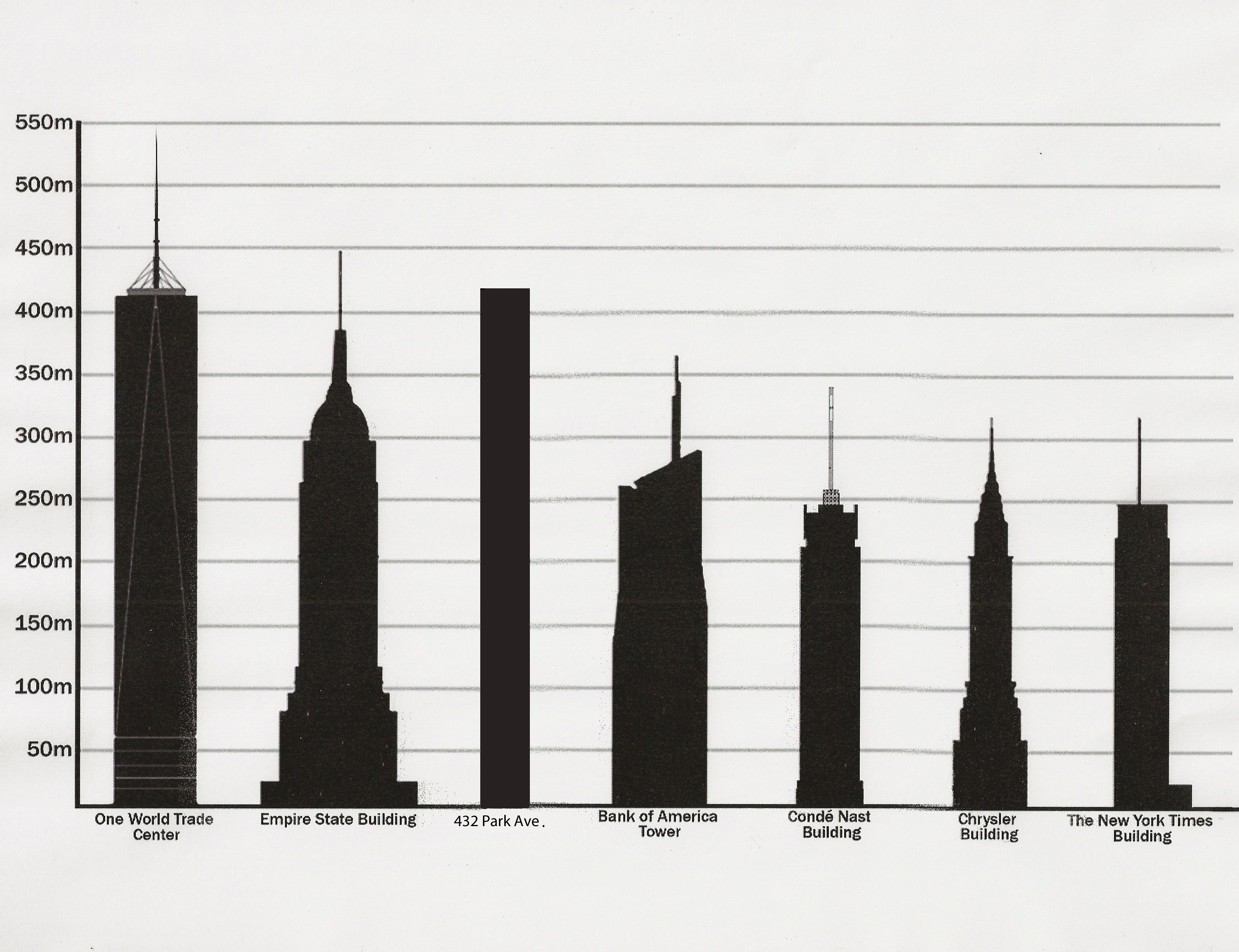
Height comparison of buildings in New York City

The Chrysler family inherited the property after the death of Walter Chrysler in 1940, with the property being under the ownership of W.P. Chrysler Building Corporation. In 1944, the corporation filed plans to build a 38-story annex to the east of the building, at 666 Third Avenue. In 1949, this was revised to a 32-story annex costing $9 million. The annex building, designed by Reinhard, Hofmeister & Walquist, had a facade similar to that of the original Chrysler Building. The stone for the original building was no longer manufactured, and had to be specially replicated. Construction started on the annex in June 1950, and the first tenants started leasing in June 1951. The building itself was completed by 1952, and a sky bridge connecting the two buildings' seventh floors was built in 1959.

The family sold the building in 1953 to William Zeckendorf for its assessed price of $18 million. The 1953 deal included the annex and the nearby Graybar Building, which, along with the Chrysler Building, sold for a combined $52 million. The new owners were Zeckendorf's company Webb and Knapp, who held a 75% interest in the sale, and the Graysler Corporation, who held a 25% stake. At the time, it was reported to be the largest real estate sale in New York City's history. In 1957, the Chrysler Building, its annex, and the Graybar Building were sold for $66 million to Lawrence Wien's realty syndicate, setting a new record for the largest sale in the city.

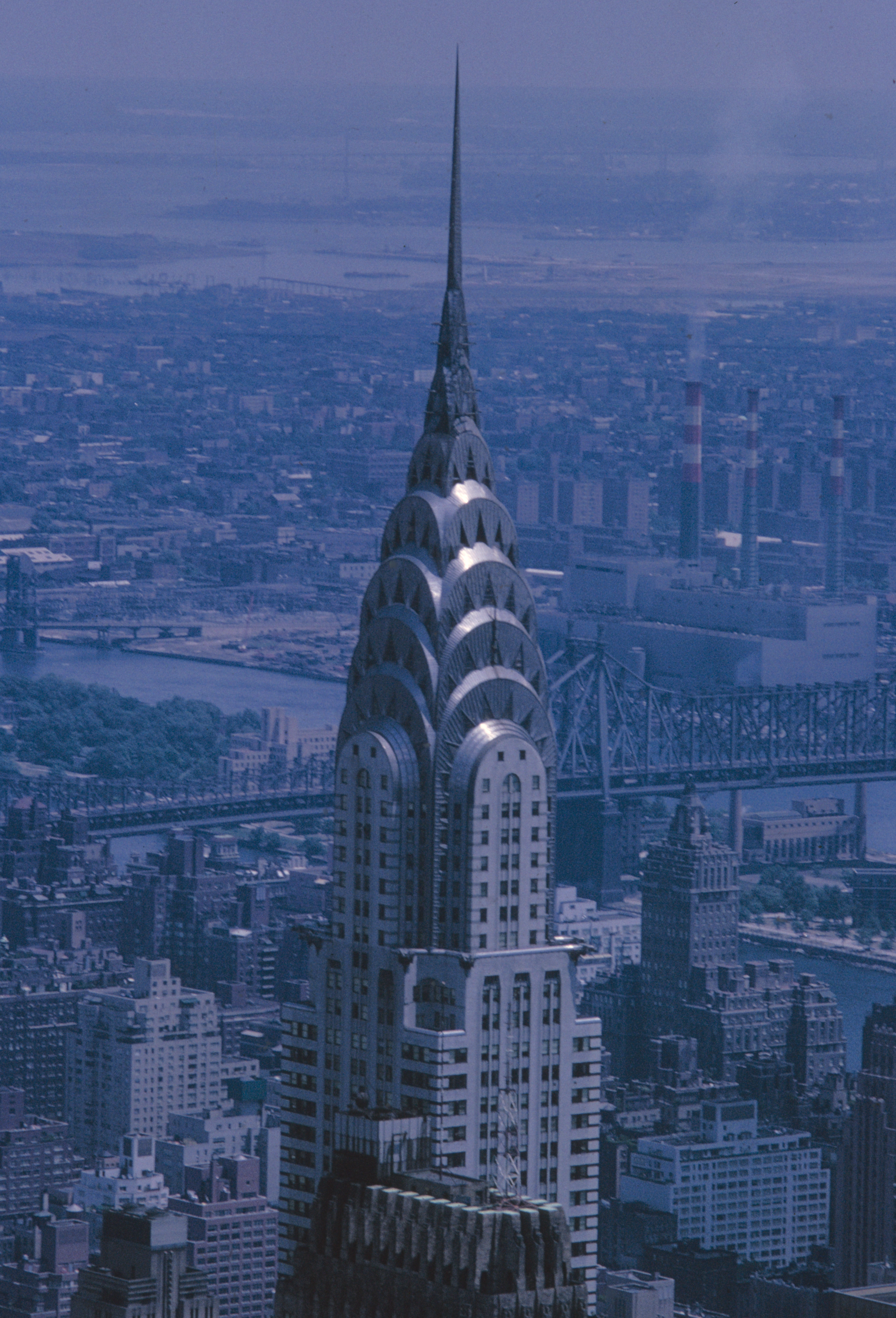
The Chrysler Building in 1965

In 1960, the complex was purchased by Sol Goldman and Alex DiLorenzo, who received a mortgage from the Massachusetts Mutual Life Insurance Company. The next year, the building's stainless steel elements, including the needle, crown, gargoyles, and entrance doors, were polished for the first time. A group of ten workers steam-cleaned the facade below the 30th floor, and manually cleaned the portion of the tower above the 30th floor, for a cost of about $200,000. Under Goldman and DiLorenzo's operation, the building began to develop leaks and cracked walls, and about 1,200 cubic yards (920 m^{3}) of garbage piled up in the basement. The scale of the deterioration led one observer to say that the Chrysler Building was being operated "like a tenement in the South Bronx". The Chrysler Building remained profitable until 1974, when the owners faced increasing taxes and fuel costs.

==== 1970s to mid-1990s ====
Foreclosure proceedings against the building began in August 1975, when Goldman and DiLorenzo defaulted on the $29 million first mortgage and a $15 million second mortgage. The building was about 17 percent vacant at the time. Massachusetts Mutual acquired the Chrysler Building for $35 million, purchasing all the outstanding debt on the building via several transactions. The next year, the Chrysler Building was designated as a National Historic Landmark. Texaco, one of the building's major tenants, was relocating to Westchester County, New York, by then, vacating hundreds of thousands of square feet at the Chrysler Building. In early 1978, Mass Mutual devised plans to renovate the facade, heating, ventilation, air-conditioning, elevators, lobby murals, and Cloud Club headquarters for $23 million. At a press conference announcing the renovation, mayor Ed Koch proclaimed that "the steel eagles and the gargoyles of the Chrysler Building are all shouting the renaissance of New York". Massachusetts Mutual had hired Josephine Sokolski, who had proposed modifying Van Alen's original lobby design substantially.

After the renovation was announced, the New York City Landmarks Preservation Commission (LPC) considered designating the Chrysler Building as a city landmark. Though Mass Mutual had proclaimed "sensitivity and respect" for the building's architecture, it had opposed the city landmark designation, concerned that the designation would hinder leasing. At the time, the building had 500,000 square feet (46,000 m^{2}) of vacant floor space, representing 40% of the total floor area. The owners hired the Edward S. Gordon Company as the building's leasing agent, and the firm leased 750,000 square feet (70,000 m^{2}) of vacant space within five years. The LPC designated the lobby and facade as city landmarks in September 1978. Massachusetts Mutual had hired Josephine Sokolski to renovate the lobby, but the LPC objected that many aspects of Sokolski's planned redesign had deviated too much from Van Alen's original design. As a result of these disputes, the renovation of the lobby was delayed.

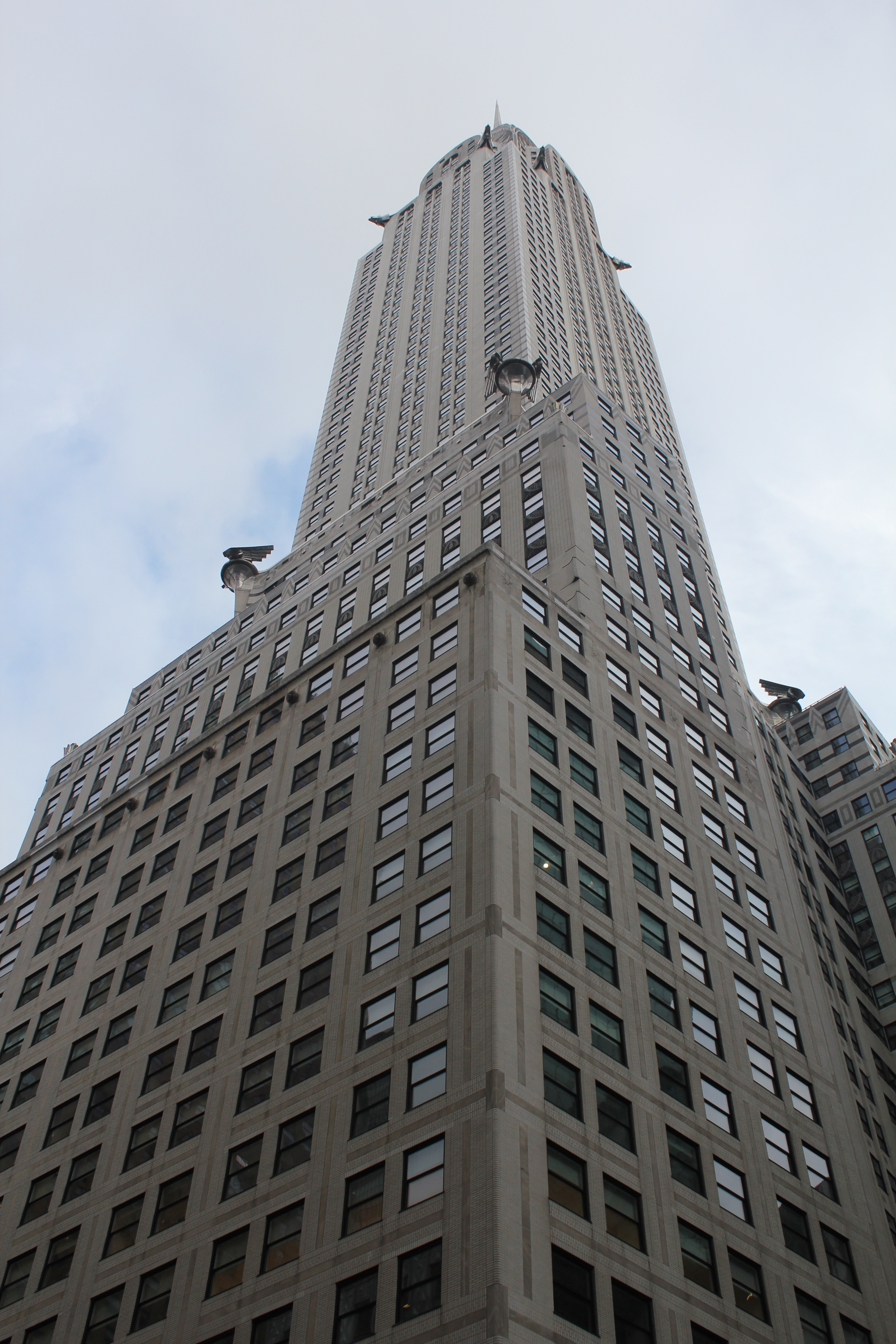
The Chrysler Building seen from ground level

The building was sold again in August 1979, this time to entrepreneur and Washington Redskins owner Jack Kent Cooke, in a deal that also transferred ownership of the Los Angeles Kings and Lakers to Jerry Buss. At the time, the building was 96 percent occupied. The new owners hired Kenneth Kleiman of Descon Interiors to redesign the lobby and elevator cabs in a style that was much closer to Van Alen's original design. Cooke also oversaw the completion of a lighting scheme at the pinnacle, which had been part of the original design but was never completed. The lighting system, consisting of 580 fluorescent tubes installed within the triangular windows of the top stories, was first illuminated in September 1981.

Cooke next hired Hoffman Architects to restore the exterior and spire from 1995 to 1996. The joints in the now-closed observation deck were polished, and the facade restored, as part of a $1.5 million project. Some damaged steel strips of the needle were replaced and several parts of the gargoyles were re-welded together. The cleaning received the New York Landmarks Conservancy's Lucy G. Moses Preservation Award for 1997. Cooke died in April 1997, and his mortgage lender Fuji Bank moved to foreclose on the building the next month. Shortly after Fuji announced its intent to foreclose, several developers and companies announced that they were interested in buying the building. Ultimately, 20 potential buyers submitted bids to buy the Chrysler Building and several adjacent buildings.

==== Late 1990s to 2010s ====
Tishman Speyer and the Travelers Insurance Group won the right to buy the building in November 1997, having submitted a bid for about $220 million (equal to $440 million in 2025). Tishman Speyer had negotiated a 150-year lease from the Cooper Union, which continued to own the land under the Chrysler Building. In 1998, Tishman Speyer announced that it had hired Beyer Blinder Belle to renovate the building and incorporate it into a commercial complex known as the Chrysler Center. As part of this project, EverGreene Architectural Arts restored the Transport and Human Endeavor mural in the lobby, which had been covered up during the late-1970s renovation. The renovation cost $100 million. In 2001, a 75 percent stake in the building was sold for US$300 million (equal to $550 million in 2025) to TMW, the German arm of an Atlanta-based investment fund. The building was 95 percent occupied by 2005.

In June 2008, it was reported that the Abu Dhabi Investment Council was in negotiations to buy TMW's 75 percent ownership stake, Tishman Speyer's 15 percent stake, and a share of the Trylons retail structure next door for US$800 million. The transaction was completed the next month, and the Abu Dhabi Investment Council assumed a 90 percent stake in the building, with Tishman Speyer retaining 10 percent. Tishman continued to manage the building and paid the Cooper Union $7.5 million a year. From 2010 to 2011, the building's energy, plumbing, and waste management systems were renovated. This resulted in a 21 percent decrease in the building's total energy consumption and 64 percent decrease in water consumption. In addition, 81 percent of waste was recycled. In 2012, the building received a LEED Gold accreditation from the U.S. Green Building Council, which recognized the building's environmental sustainability and energy efficiency.

==== RFR Holding operation ====
The building seen at night

The Abu Dhabi Investment Council and Tishman Speyer put the Chrysler Building's leasehold for sale again in January 2019. That March, the media reported that Aby Rosen's RFR Holding LLC, in a joint venture with the Austrian Signa Group, had reached an agreement to purchase the leasehold at a steeply discounted $150 million. In exchange, Rosen had to pay the Cooper Union $32.5 million a year, a steep increase from the rate the previous leaseholders had paid.

Rosen initially planned to convert the building into a hotel, but he dropped these plans in April 2019, citing difficulties with the ground lease. Rosen then announced plans for an observation deck on the 61st-story setback, which the LPC approved in May 2020. He also wanted to reopen the Cloud Club and attract multiple restaurateurs. Rosen sought to renegotiate the terms of his ground lease with Cooper Union in 2020, and he evicted storeowners from all of the building's shops in an ultimately unsuccessful attempt to renovate the retail space. To attract tenants following the onset of the COVID-19 pandemic in New York City in 2020, he converted the Chrysler Building's ground-floor space into a tenant amenity center. RFR estimated that it had spent $170 million to renovate the building. RFR and Signa attempted to restructure the ground lease again in 2021 and 2023, both times without success. By then, according to an anonymous source cited by Curbed, RFR was losing an estimated $1 million a month from the Chrysler Building's operation.

In December 2023, Signa's creditors ordered the company to sell its stake in the Chrysler Building, following Signa's insolvency. RFR offered to buy Signa's ownership stake for a nominal fee of $1. Meanwhile, RFR sought to lease the building's retail space to luxury stores, signing their first luxury tenant in March 2024. By mid-2024, the building was aging significantly, and RFR had listed about 650,000 square feet (60,000 m^{2}) of the Chrysler Building's office space as being "immediately available for rent". The New York Times reported that employees had complained about pest infestations, fountains with brown water, weak cellular reception, elevator delays, and poor natural lighting. Additionally, it would cost millions of dollars to upgrade the building to meet modern energy-efficiency codes.

==== RFR lease termination, Tishman Speyer takeover ====
The Cooper Union moved to terminate RFR's ground lease of the Chrysler Building in September 2024, and RFR sued the college to prevent the termination of its leasehold. In its lawsuit, RFR claimed that the Cooper Union had driven away some tenants and had directed other tenants to make rent payments to the college rather than to RFR. Subsequently, the Cooper Union requested that RFR be evicted, and a state judge ordered tenants to pay rent to the Cooper Union that October. RFR's lease was ultimately terminated in January 2025, and the Cooper Union began seeking buyers for the building's ground lease that May. SL Green and Jeffrey Gural were among the developers that expressed interest in buying the lease.

In October 2026, it was announced that Tishman Speyer had bought the building for $235 million, with plans for a major renovation. The company continued to rent the land from the Cooper Union, which used the proceeds from the purchase to reinstate a free-tuition program for its students.

== Chrysler Center ==
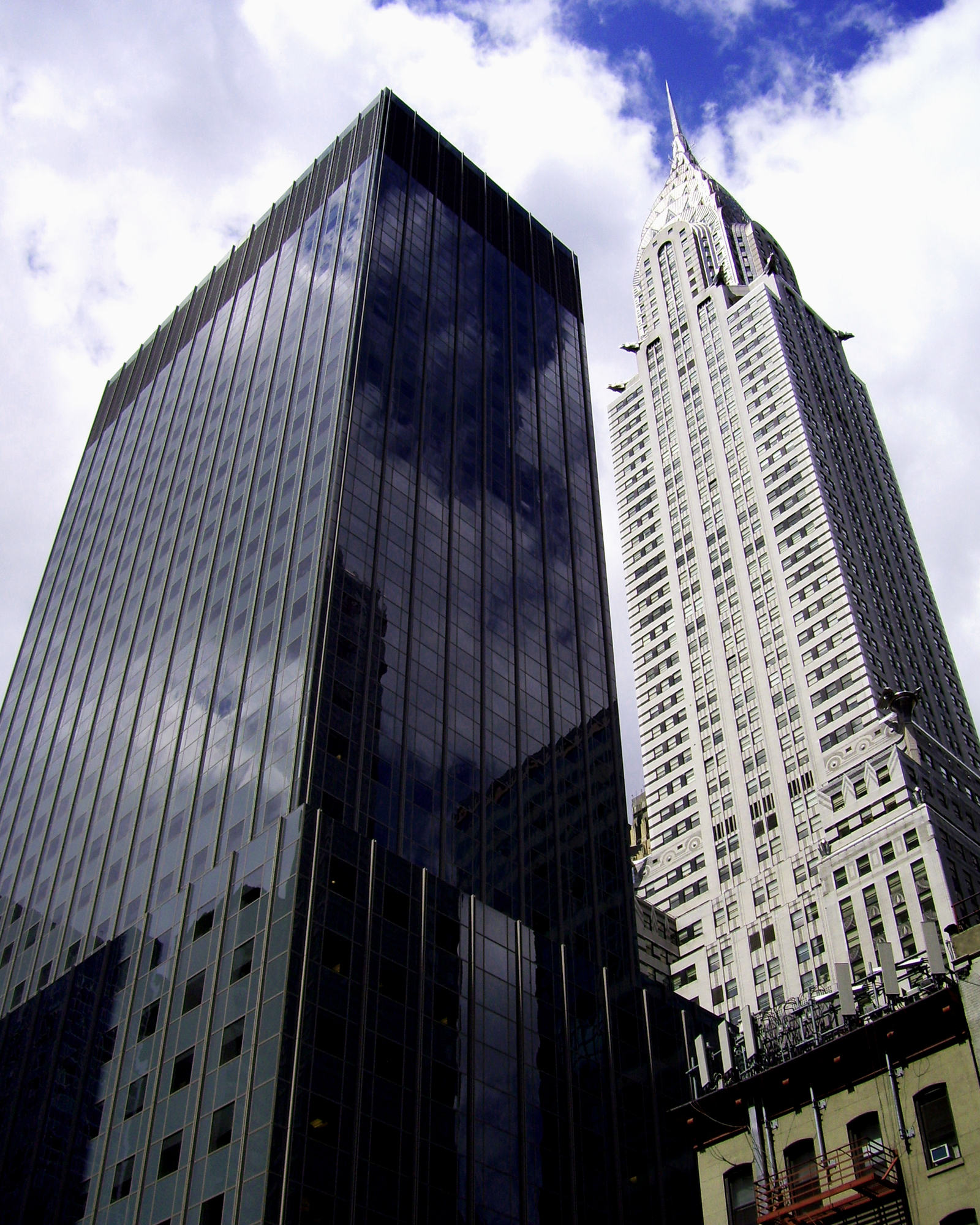
Chrysler East (on the left), seen next to the original building

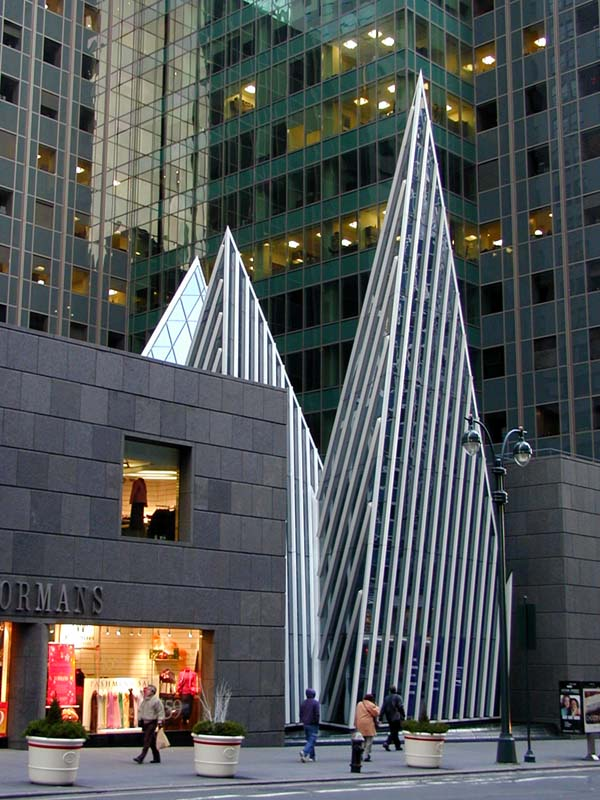
Chrysler Trylons

Chrysler Center is the building complex consisting of the Chrysler Building to the west, Chrysler Building East to the east, and the Chrysler Trylons commercial pavilion in the middle. After Tishman Speyer had acquired the entire complex, the firm renovated it completely from 1998 to 2000.

The structure at 666 Third Avenue, known as the Kent Building at the time, was renovated and renamed Chrysler Building East. This International Style building, built in 1952, is 432 feet (132 m) high and has 32 floors. The mechanical systems were modernized and the interior was modified. Postmodern architect Philip Johnson designed a new facade of dark-blue glass, which was placed about 4 inches (100 mm) in front of the Kent Building's existing facade. The structure did not resemble its western neighbor; Johnson explained that he did not "even like the architecture" of the Chrysler Building, despite acknowledging it as "the most loved building in New York". His design also included a 135,000-square-foot (12,500 m^{2}) extension which surrounded the elevator core on the western end of the original Kent Building. The expansion used 150,000 square feet (14,000 m^{2}) of unused air rights above the buildings in the middle of the block. The Kent Building was not a New York City designated landmark, unlike the Chrysler Building, so its renovation did not require the LPC's approval. After the addition, the total area of the Kent building was 770,000 square feet (72,000 m^{2}).

A new building, also designed by Philip Johnson, was built between the original skyscraper and the annex. This became the Chrysler Trylons, a commercial pavilion three stories high with a retail area of 22,000 square feet (2,000 m^{2}). Its design consists of three triangular glass "trylons" measuring 57 ft (17 m), 68 ft (21 m), and 73 ft (22 m) tall; each is slanted in a different direction. The trylons are supported by vertical steel mullions measuring 10 in (250 mm) wide; between the mullions are 535 panes of reflective gray glass. The retail structures themselves are placed on either side of the trylons. Due to the complexity of the structural work, structural engineer Severud Associates built a replica at Rimouski, Quebec. Johnson designed the Chrysler Trylons as "a monument for 42nd Street [...] to give you the top of the Chrysler Building at street level."

After these modifications, the total leasable area of the complex was 2,062,772 square feet (191,637.8 m^{2}). The total cost of this project was about one hundred million dollars. This renovation has won several awards and commendations, including an Energy Star rating from the Environmental Protection Agency; a LEED Gold designation; and the Skyscraper Museum Outstanding Renovation Award of 2001.

== Tenants ==
In January 1930, the Chrysler Corporation opened satellite offices in the Chrysler Building during Automobile Show Week. In addition to the Chrysler Salon product showroom on the first and second floors, the building had a lounge and a theater for showing films of Chrysler products. Other original large tenants included Time, Inc. and Texaco oil. Needing more office space, Time moved to Rockefeller Center in 1937. By October 1946, television transmitter equipment for CBS was located in the Chrysler Building spire, fed by cables from CBS television studios located nearby in the Grand Central Terminal building, above the former waiting room.

In 1977, Texaco relocated to a more suburban workplace in Purchase, New York. In addition, the offices of Shaw Walker and J. S. Bache & Company were immediately atop the Chrysler Salon, while A. B. Dick, Pan American World Airways, Adams Hats, Schrafft's, and Florsheim Shoes also had offices in the building. By the 21st century, many of the Chrysler Building's tenants leased space there because of the building's historical stature, rather than because of its amenities.

Notable tenants in the 21st century include:

- Creative Artists Agency
- Clyde & Co
- InterMedia Partners
- IWG
- PA Consulting
- Troutman Sanders
- YES Network

== Impact ==
=== Reception ===
The completed Chrysler Building garnered mixed reviews in the press. Van Alen was hailed as the "Doctor of Altitude" by Architect magazine, while architect Kenneth Murchison called Van Alen the "Ziegfeld of his profession", comparing him to popular Broadway producer Florenz Ziegfeld Jr. The building was praised for being "an expression of the intense activity and vibrant life of our day", and for "teem[ing] with the spirit of modernism, ... the epitome of modern business life, stand[ing] for progress in architecture and in modern building methods." An anonymous critic wrote in Architectural Forum's October 1930 issue: "The Chrysler...stands by itself, something apart and alone. It is simply the realization, the fulfillment in metal and masonry, of a one-man dream, a dream of such ambitions and such magnitude as to defy the comprehension and the criticism of ordinary men or by ordinary standards." Walter Chrysler himself regarded the building as a "monument to me".

The journalist George S. Chappell called the Chrysler's design "distinctly a stunt design, evolved to make the man in the street look up". Douglas Haskell stated that the building "embodies no compelling, organic idea", and alleged that Van Alen had abandoned "some of his best innovations in behalf of stunts and new 'effects'". Others compared the Chrysler Building to "an upended swordfish", or claimed it had a "Little Nemo"-like design. Lewis Mumford, a supporter of the International Style and one of the foremost architectural critics of the United States at the time, despised the building for its "inane romanticism, meaningless voluptuousness, [and] void symbolism". The public also had mixed reviews of the Chrysler Building, as Murchison wrote: "Some think it's a freak; some think it's a stunt." The architectural professor Gail Fenske said that, although the Chrysler Building was criticized as "too theatrical" at the time of its completion, the general public quickly took a liking to "the city's crowning skyscraper".

Later reviews were more positive. Architect Robert A. M. Stern wrote that the Chrysler Building was "the most extreme example of the [1920s and 1930s] period's stylistic experimentation", as contrasted with 40 Wall Street and its "thin" detailing. George H. Douglas wrote in 2004 that the Chrysler Building "remains one of the most appealing and awe-inspiring of skyscrapers". Architect Le Corbusier called the building "hot jazz in stone and steel". Architectural critic Ada Louise Huxtable stated that the building had "a wonderful, decorative, evocative aesthetic", while Paul Goldberger noted the "compressed, intense energy" of the lobby, the "magnificent" elevators, and the "magical" view from the crown. Anthony W. Robins said the Chrysler Building was "one-of-a-kind, staggering, romantic, soaring, the embodiment of 1920s skyscraper pizzazz, the great symbol of Art Deco New York". Kim Velsey of Curbed said that the building "is unabashedly over the top" because of "its steel gargoyles, Moroccan marble lobby, and illuminated spire".

The LPC said that the tower "embodies the romantic essence of the New York City skyscraper". Pauline Frommer, in the travel guide Frommer's, gave the building an "exceptional" recommendation, saying: "In the Chrysler Building we see the roaring-twenties version of what Alan Greenspan called 'irrational exuberance'—a last burst of corporate headquarter building before stocks succumbed to the thudding crash of 1929." In 2026, Architectural Record magazine included the Chrysler Building on its list of "the most significant works of American architecture", and architect Mark Foster Gage wrote that it was "the quintessential American icon" because it rejected older, European-inspired styles.

=== As icon ===
The Chrysler Building appears in several films set in New York and is widely considered one of the most positively acclaimed buildings in the city. A 1996 survey of New York architects revealed it as their favorite, and The New York Times described it in 2005 as "the single most important emblem of architectural imagery on the New York skyline". In mid-2005, the Skyscraper Museum in Lower Manhattan asked 100 architects, builders, critics, engineers, historians, and scholars, among others, to choose their 10 favorites among 25 of the city's towers. The Chrysler Building came in first place, with 90 respondents placing it on their ballots. In 2007, the building ranked ninth among 150 buildings in the AIA's list of America's Favorite Architecture. The building was included in the Lego Company's architecture set representing the New York City skyline.

The Chrysler Building is widely heralded as an Art Deco icon. Fodor's New York City 2010 described the building as being "one of the great art deco masterpieces" which "wins many a New Yorker's vote for the city's most iconic and beloved skyscraper". Frommer's states that the Chrysler was "one of the most impressive Art Deco buildings ever constructed". Insight Guides' 2016 edition maintains that the Chrysler Building is considered among the city's "most beautiful" buildings. Its distinctive profile has inspired similar skyscrapers worldwide, including One Liberty Place in Philadelphia, Two Prudential Plaza in Chicago, and the Al Kazim Towers in Dubai. In addition, the New York-New York Hotel and Casino in Paradise, Nevada, contains the "Chrysler Tower", a replica of the Chrysler Building measuring 35 or 40 stories tall. A portion of the hotel's interior was also designed to resemble the Chrysler Building's interior.

=== In media ===
While seen in many films, the Chrysler Building almost never appears as a main setting in them, prompting architect and author James Sanders to quip it should win "the Award for Best Supporting Skyscraper". The building was supposed to be featured in the 1933 film King Kong, but only makes a cameo at the end thanks to its producers opting for the Empire State Building in a central role. The Chrysler Building appears in the background of The Wiz (1978); as the setting of much of Q - The Winged Serpent (1982); in the initial credits of The Shadow of the Witness (1987); at the beginning of The Bonfire of the Vanities (1990); and during or after apocalyptic events in Independence Day (1996), Armageddon (1998), Deep Impact (1998), Godzilla (1998), and A.I. Artificial Intelligence (2001). The building also appears in other films, such as Spider-Man (2002), Fantastic Four: Rise of the Silver Surfer (2007), Two Weeks Notice (2002), The Sorcerer's Apprentice (2010), The Avengers (2012) and Men in Black 3 (2012). The building is mentioned in the number "It's the Hard Knock Life" for the musical Annie, and it is the setting for the post-game content in the Squaresoft video game Parasite Eve. In addition, the introductory scenes of the TV show Sex and the City depict the Chrysler Building.

In December 1929, Walter Chrysler hired Margaret Bourke-White to take publicity images from a scaffold 400 feet (120 m) high. She was deeply inspired by the new structure and especially smitten by the massive eagle's-head figures projecting off the building. According to one account, Bourke-White wanted to live in the building for the duration of the photo shoot, but the only person able to do so was the janitor, so she was instead relegated to co-leasing a studio with Time Inc. In 1930, several of her photographs were used in a special report on skyscrapers in the then-new Fortune magazine. Bourke-White worked in a 61st-floor studio designed by John Vassos until she was evicted in 1934. That year, Bourke-White's partner Oscar Graubner took a famous photo called "Margaret Bourke-White atop the Chrysler Building", which depicts her taking a photo of the city's skyline while sitting on one of the 61st-floor eagle ornaments. On October 5, 1998, Christie's auctioned the photograph for $96,000.

The Chrysler Building has been the subject of other photographs as well. During a January 1931 dance organized by the Society of Beaux-Arts, six architects, including Van Alen, were photographed while wearing costumes resembling the buildings that each architect designed. In 1991, the photographer Annie Leibovitz took pictures of the dancer David Parsons reclining on a ledge near the top of the building.

== See also ==
- Architecture of New York City
- List of buildings and structures
- List of New York City Designated Landmarks in Manhattan from 14th to 59th Streets
- List of tallest buildings and structures in the world
- List of tallest buildings in the United States
- List of tallest buildings in New York City
- List of tallest freestanding structures in the world
- List of tallest freestanding steel structures
- National Register of Historic Places listings in Manhattan from 14th to 59th Streets

Records
Preceded by Eiffel Tower	World's tallest structure 1930–1931	Succeeded by Empire State Building
Preceded by 40 Wall Street	Tallest building in the world 1930–1931	Succeeded by Empire State Building
Preceded by 40 Wall Street	Tallest building in the United States; 1930–1931	Succeeded by Empire State Building
