= Graybar Building =

Office skyscraper in Manhattan, New York

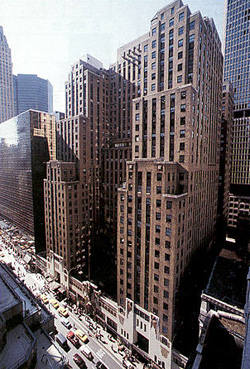
- Viewed from the northeast, across the intersection of 44th Street and Lexington Avenue
- Interactive map of the Graybar Building area

General information
- Type: Office
- Architectural style: Art Deco
- Location: 420–430 Lexington Avenue, Manhattan, New York
- Coordinates: 40°45′09″N 73°58′33″W
- Construction started: 1925
- Completed: 1927
- Owner: SL Green Realty

Height
- Architectural: 351 feet (107 m)

Technical details
- Floor count: 30

Design and construction
- Architect: John Sloan
- Architecture firm: Sloan & Robertson
- Developer: Graybar
- Engineer: Clyde R. Place

New York City Landmark
- Designated: November 22, 2016
- Reference no.: 2554

The Graybar Building, also known as 420 Lexington Avenue, is a 30-story office building in Midtown Manhattan, New York City. Designed by Sloan & Robertson in the Art Deco style, the Graybar Building is at 420–430 Lexington Avenue between 43rd and 44th Streets, adjacent to Grand Central Terminal.

The building was erected within "Terminal City", a collection of buildings above Grand Central's underground tracks. As such, it occupies the real-estate air rights above these tracks. The building's superstructure is constructed entirely above the tracks of the terminal. The ground floor includes the "Graybar Passage", a publicly accessible passageway that leads from Lexington Avenue to Grand Central Terminal. On upper stories, the Graybar Building contains office space with setbacks and "light courts" to conform with the 1916 Zoning Resolution.

When the building's construction started in 1925, it was known as the Eastern Terminal Office Building. The structure was renamed after Graybar, one of its original lessees, the next year. The Graybar Building opened in April 1927 and was fully leased within less than a year. Ownership of the building passed several times before the current owners, SL Green Realty, bought it in 1998. The New York City Landmarks Preservation Commission designated the Graybar Building as an official landmark in 2016.

== Site ==
The Graybar Building is bounded by Lexington Avenue to the east and the Park Avenue Viaduct to the west, running between 44th Street in the north to 43rd Street in the south. The western side of the building underneath the Park Avenue Viaduct faces Depew Place, which was laid out when the original Grand Central Depot was built in the late 19th century, and destroyed with the construction of the current terminal. The alley still survives as a driveway for the nearby post office. The building is assigned its own ZIP Code, 10170; it was one of 41 buildings in Manhattan that had their own ZIP Codes as of 2019.

=== Previous buildings ===
In 1871, the New York Central Railroad built the Grand Central Depot, a ground-level depot at the intersection of Park Avenue and 42nd Street, which would be succeeded in 1900 by Grand Central Station, also located at ground level. The Graybar Building's site, located just east of the depot and station, was partly occupied by the original Grand Central Palace, which was built c. 1893 and later used as a hotel. The site also contained a small ground-floor post office. On January 8, 1902, a crash between two steam trains in the Park Avenue Tunnel killed 15 people, leading New York Central president William H. Newman to announce the construction of a new underground terminal station.

The land under the original Grand Central Palace was originally owned by the estate of the entrepreneur Robert Goelet, who died in 1899. In 1902, several months after the fatal Park Avenue Tunnel crash, the trustees of the Goelet estate offered the land to New York Central for use as a post office. The site was acquired by New York Central in 1904, and a temporary 14-track terminal was built under the Palace while the old Grand Central Station was being demolished in sections. The original Palace was demolished by 1913 to make way for the construction of Grand Central Terminal. The terminal's post office, Commodore Hotel New York, and the Graybar Building would later take up the Palace's site.

The completion of Grand Central Terminal resulted in the rapid development of the areas around Grand Central, and a corresponding increase in real-estate prices. By 1920, the area had become what The New York Times called "a great civic centre". The 275-by-250-foot (84 by 76 m) site of the building had been cleared before 1919 to make way for the post office, but the future site of the Graybar Building had not yet been developed.

== Architecture ==
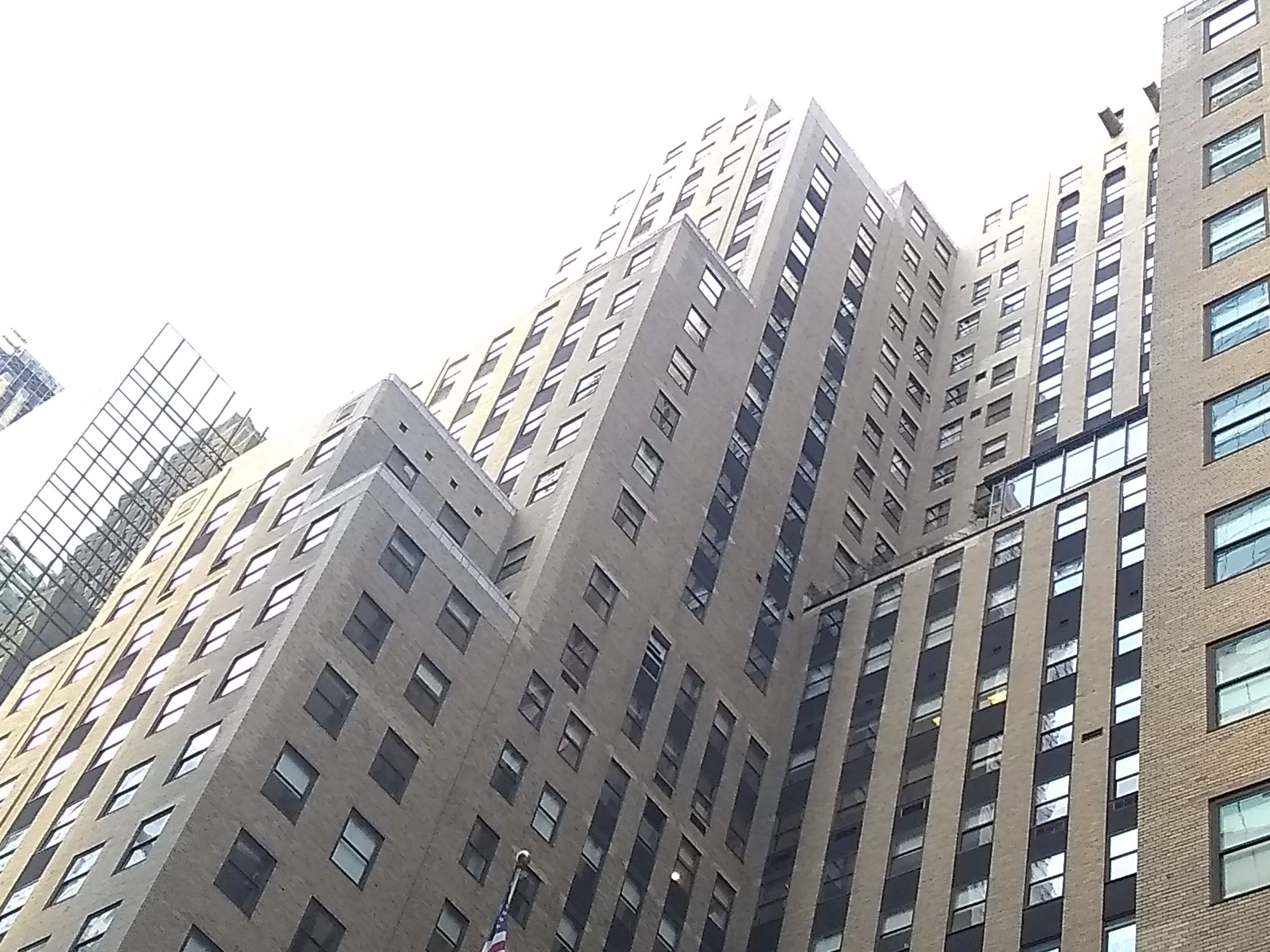
Setbacks on the upper eastern facade of the building

The Graybar Building was designed by Sloan & Robertson in the Art Deco style, with Clyde R. Place as consulting engineer. It is officially located at 420 Lexington Avenue, though it also occupies the lots at 420–430 Lexington Avenue. The Graybar Building is 351 feet (107 m) tall, with 30 stories. It has a floor area of approximately 1.35 million square feet (125,000 m^{2}).

The Graybar Building was one of several buildings in Grand Central Terminal's immediate vicinity that were erected after the terminal was completed in 1913. Grand Central Terminal's tracks and platforms were located underground, unlike Grand Central Depot and Grand Central Station, which it replaced. The terminal's construction was partly funded by the sale of above-ground air rights for real-estate development, which were collectively called Terminal City. In the 1990s, as part of the creation of a special zoning area near Grand Central, planners considered the site of the Graybar Building for the possible development of another building, in order to make use of excess air rights over the Grand Central site. These planners cited "outdated systems; not first-class office space; prime location; [and] large lot". Another proposal to make use of the Graybar Building site's air rights was presented in 2012 as part of a rezoning of East Midtown. The 2012 proposal led to the designation of the Graybar Building as a city landmark in 2016, in order to prevent it from being torn down for air rights development.

=== Form ===
Graph of the 1916 New York City zoning ordinance with an example elevation for an 80-foot street in a 2½-times height district

Unlike previous buildings in Terminal City, the Graybar Building was built with setbacks and "light courts" to conform with the 1916 Zoning Resolution. The western part of the building is shaped like a capital "H", while the eastern part consists of two arms branching eastward from the eastern part of the "H", giving it the shape of a "C". The "H" and "C" form three light courts: a set of north- and south-facing courts on the western part of the building, within the "H", and a 70-foot-wide (21 m) east-facing court on the eastern part of the building, within the "C". The presence of the three light courts resulted in much of the floor area being close to a window, and the building incorporated over 4,300 window openings.

The 1916 Zoning Resolution resulted in a structure that incorporated setbacks along the Lexington Avenue elevation. These setbacks were located on the 15th, 17th, 19th, and 23rd floors. The ordinance was intended to allow light to reach the streets and the lower floors of skyscrapers. The side elevations do not contain any setbacks. The northern facade faces a shorter section of the Graybar Building; the southern facade faces Grand Central Market and the Grand Hyatt New York; and the western facade faces Depew Place. the Park Avenue Viaduct, and Grand Central's main building.

=== Facade ===
Except at the base, the Graybar Building's facade was mostly undecorated. The facade was made of brick and Indiana Limestone, and the base was made of limestone. Some of the spandrels within each window contain black brick; these give the appearance of "subtle vertical bands" that contrast with the facade's more prominent portions to "accentuate the structure's height". Toward the top of the facade adjoining Lexington Avenue are four projecting gargoyle-shaped water spouts.

==== Portals ====
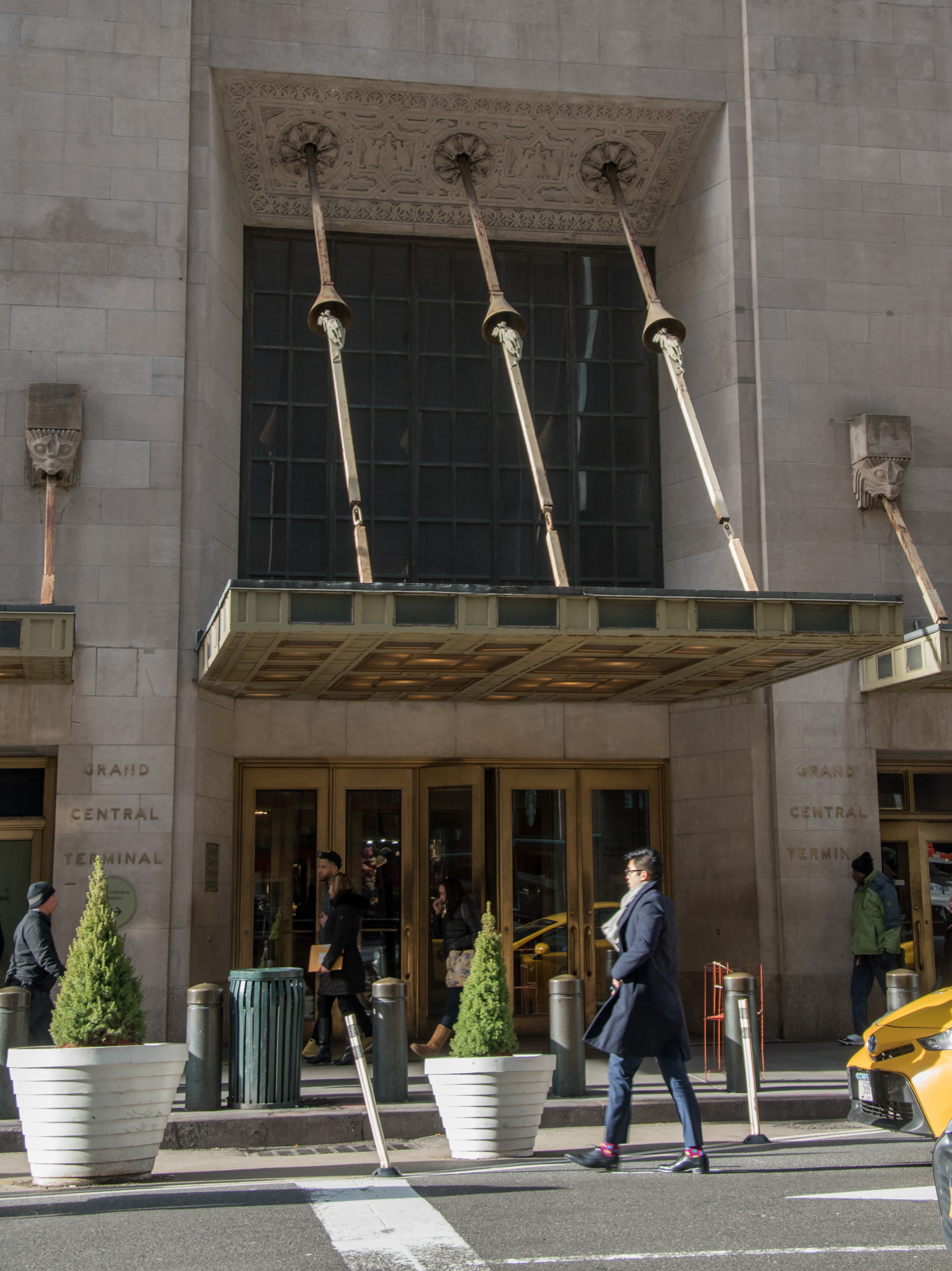
South entrance portal, center marquee

The Graybar Building contains three entrance portals from Lexington Avenue on the east. The southernmost portal leads from 43rd Street to the Graybar Passage, which connects west to Grand Central Terminal. This portal contains three sets of doors with separate marquees for each. The center set of doors is located under a marquee supported by three diagonal metal struts, while the marquees over the side doors are supported by two struts. Stylized metal figures of rats are depicted on each of the struts and are shown running upward, in the direction of "inverted, funnel-shaped guards" along the struts. The architect John Sloan stated in a 1933 New Yorker article that these rats were intended to represent the city's role as a "great transportation centre and a great seaport", with its "maritime" theming. Building manager Herbert Metz told the Times in 1955 that the rat sculptures "symbolize a ship", which by extension, evokes imagery of a port. These rats, removed in the 1990s, were replaced during the building's renovation at the end of the 20th century.

On the center portal is a relief, which displays the capital letters "graybar building" and depicts two "winged guardian creatures". There are also pairs of figures outside each portal, each measuring 20 feet (6.1 m) tall. The south portal's figures depict air and water; the north portal's figures represent earth and fire; and the center portal's figures symbolize electricity and transportation. Rays of light were depicted radiating from each figure's head. Other ornamentation at the building's base included lights made of metal-and-glass, located just outside the doors, as well as vertical grilles made of stone. Sloan stated that these features were meant to evoke an "eastern" ambiance, which fit the name of the building's original owner, Eastern Offices. Above the central portal is a 65-foot-long (20 m) flagpole with multicolored lattices at its base.

The northern portal at 44th Street was likely intended to be a third entrance, but was never used as such. It was planned in conjunction with a north–south hall, which would have led from Grand Central to an unbuilt expansion of the post office adjoining the north side of the Graybar Building.

=== Interior ===
==== Ground level ====
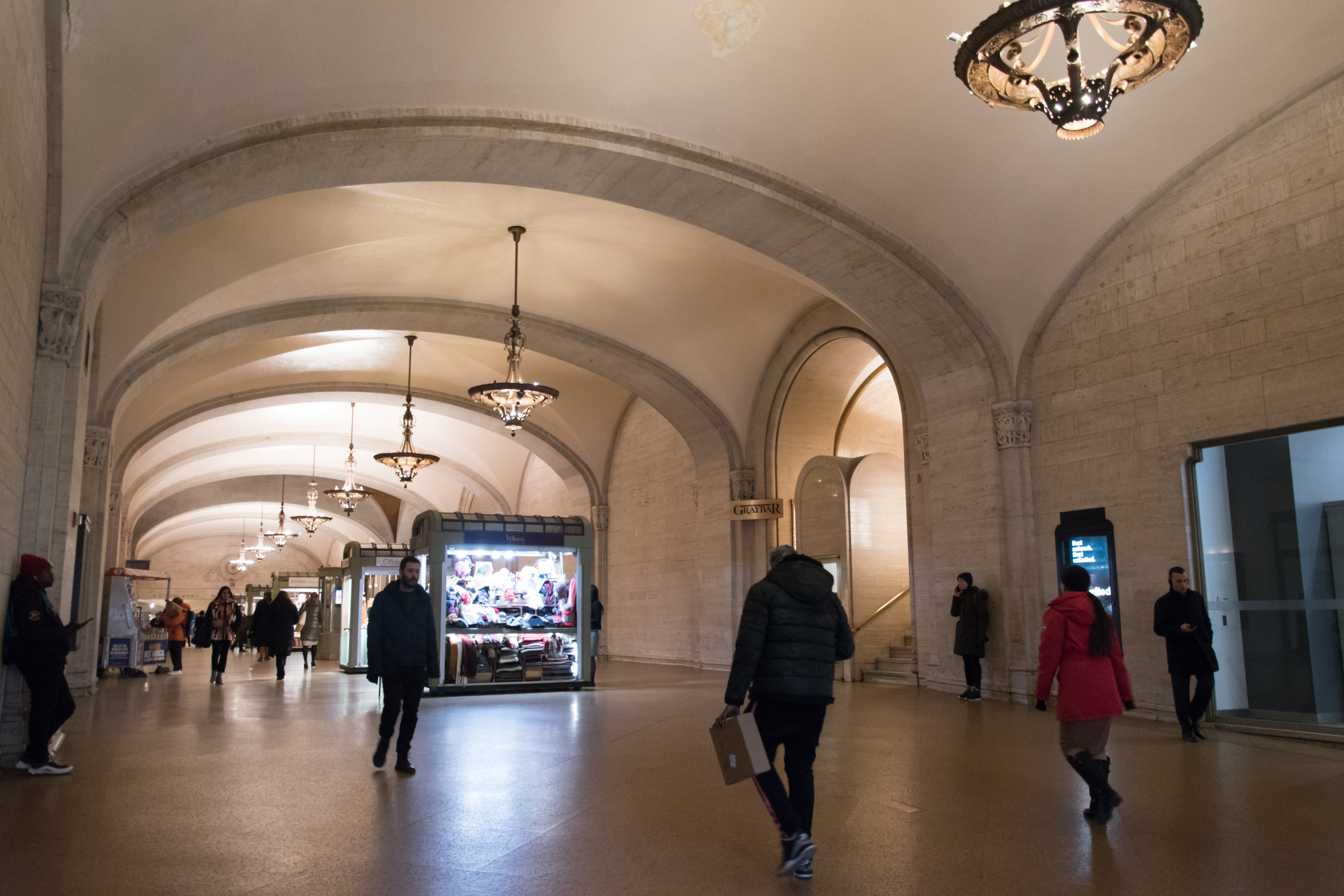
The Graybar Passage, built to connect Grand Central Terminal with Lexington Avenue, was a stipulation in the lease agreement that allowed the building to be erected

The southernmost portal leads to the Graybar Passage, one of three west–east passageways connecting Grand Central to Lexington Avenue. It was built on the first floor of the Graybar Building in 1926. The passageway has a ceiling of 28 feet (8.5 m) and is largely 40 feet (12 m) wide, widening to 60 feet (18 m) on its western end. To prevent congestion, there are no storefronts along the passageway. There are three gates leading off the northern side of the passage, leading to six of the tracks. Its walls and seven large transverse arches are of coursed ashlar travertine, and the floor is terrazzo. The ceiling is composed of seven groin vaults, each of which has an ornamental bronze chandelier. The first two vaults, as viewed from leaving Grand Central, are painted with cumulus clouds, while the third contains a 1927 mural by Edward Trumbull depicting American transportation.

The central portal of the building connects to an elevator lobby used by tenants. There is another hallway leading from the elevator lobby to the Graybar Passage. The northern section of the ground story contained a bank. The ground story also housed an extension of the Grand Central post office.

==== Basement and substructure ====
The building used 25,000 short tons (22,000 long tons; 23,000 t) of steel, and between 31 and 36 acres (130,000 and 150,000 m^{2}) of concrete. The building, and the tracks below it, both contain foundations attached to the bedrock below. However, even though there are separate structural frameworks supporting the building and the tracks, the Graybar Building's architects found that vibrations from passing trains could pass through the structure supporting the tracks, and then to the rock, resulting in vibrations to the building. To remedy this, a sheet of lead was embedded within a vibration-absorbing concrete "mat", and the Graybar Building's structural steel was anchored to the "mat".

The basements were an extension of Grand Central Terminal itself, and their construction was funded by the New York Central Railroad. The basements hold several tracks and platforms; break rooms for the "red cap" porters at Grand Central; and the terminal's M42 electrical substation. Twelve tracks and platforms on the terminal's lower level were lengthened by about 220 feet (67 m) when the Graybar Building was constructed. The porters' break rooms included locker rooms, a kitchen, a restaurant, and concessions such as a tailor. The M42 substation is about 100 feet (30 m) below the Graybar Building's ground level and opened in 1930, three years after the building's completion. West of the substation are numerous auxiliary facilities, including storerooms for equipment; a coal hopper; and shops for carpenters, painter, ironworkers, masons, pipefitters, electricians and truck repairers, and battery suppliers. On the south side of the Graybar Passage, there are elevators leading to the basement level.

==== Closed subway passage ====
An underground passage from the New York City Subway's Grand Central–42nd Street station formerly led to the southern portal of the Graybar Building. The 120-foot-long (37 m) passageway led northward from another hallway that connected to the Chrysler Building to the east. In a report published in 1991, the New York City Department of City Planning recommended closing the passage because of its low usage and its proximity to other connections. After a woman was raped in another subway passageway, the Graybar subway passage and 14 others were closed by emergency order of the New York City Transit Authority on March 29, 1991, with a public hearing being held afterward. From January 1, 1990, to its closure, there had been 365 felonies committed in the Graybar subway passage, making it the most dangerous of the 15 passageways ordered closed. The passageway had been located behind a token booth, making it hard to patrol; at the time of its closure, the hallway was described as being "deceptively long and treacherous".

== History ==
=== Planning and construction ===
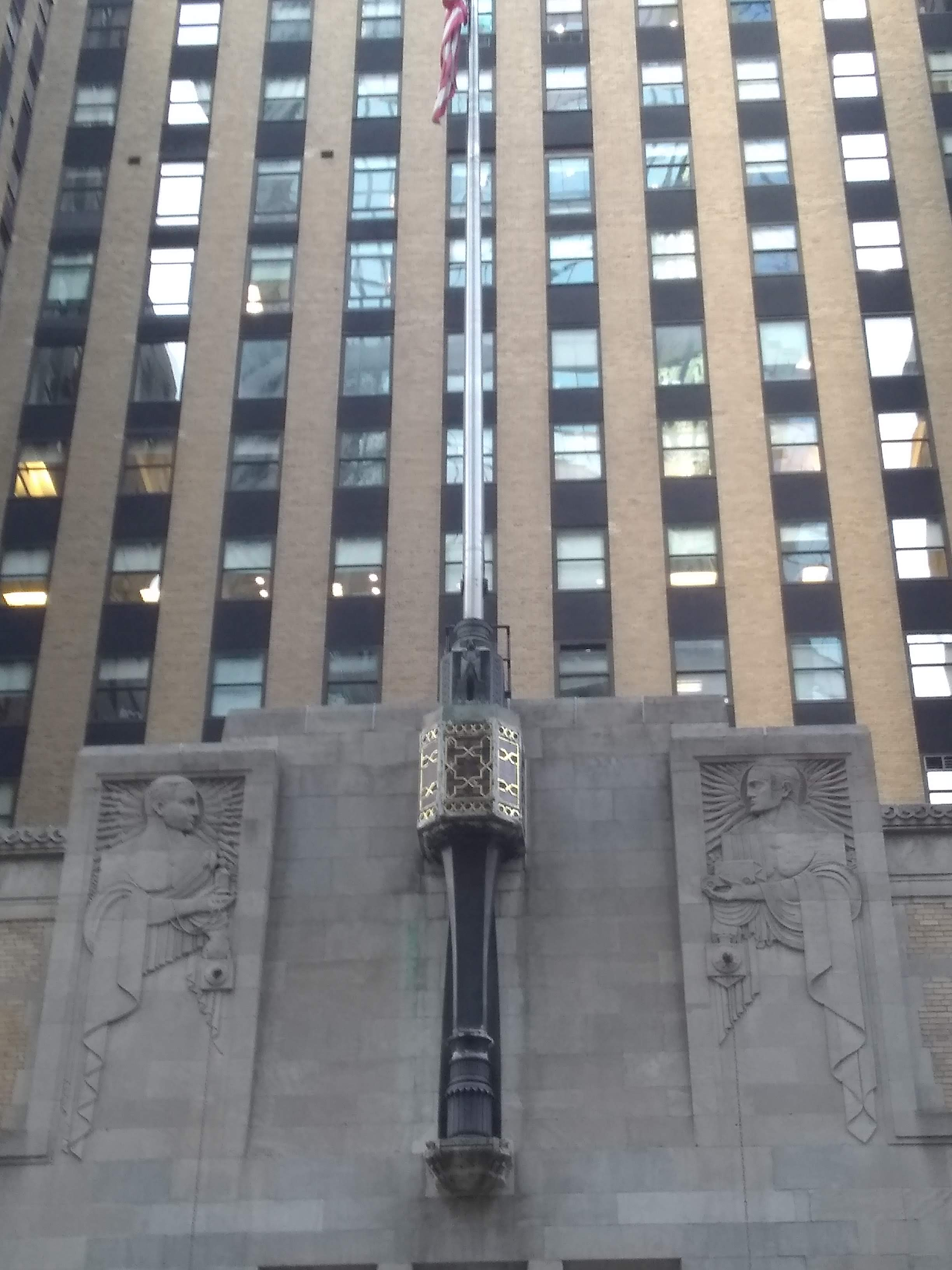
Flagpole base on the building's Lexington Avenue facade

Eastern Offices Inc. indicated in August 1925 that it wanted to build the "largest office building in the world", a 30-story tower occupying the entire site. Eastern Offices had signed an agreement to lease the site from New York Central for 21 years, which could be renewed twice, for a total maximum lease period for 63 years. The agreement stipulated that the building contain passageways to the terminal and to the New York City Subway's Grand Central–42nd Street station underneath, as well as "high-grade" office space and "auxiliary facilities" for New York Central. Eastern Offices was under the purview of the Todd, Robertson and Todd Engineering Corporation, which would later collaborate on the construction of Rockefeller Center under the name Associated Architects. Bonds worth $10 million were issued in October 1925.

The structure was originally referred to as the Eastern Terminal Office Building. In May 1926, the Graybar Electric Company leased the 15th floor. The president of Graybar was friends with one of Todd, Robertson, and Todd's partners, and the advertising company J. Walter Thompson did not want naming rights, despite having leased more floors. As a result, the project became known as the Graybar Building.

The Graybar Building's construction permit was issued by the New York City Department of Buildings in 1925, at which point the building was projected to cost $12.5 million. Excavation started in early 1925 and the foundation was dug to a maximum depth of 90 feet (27 m). Below the Graybar Building's site was track 200, which looped around Grand Central. Because track 200 had to remain in operation during the building's construction, it was moved to a temporary elevated structure. By the time Graybar leased its space in May 1926, work had commenced on the erection of the building's structural steel. Much of the 25,000-short-ton (22,000-long-ton; 23,000 t) steel frame was located underground because of the complexity of the infrastructure there. The steel was said to be near "street level" by August 1926, and a ceremony to mark the erection of the last steel piece was held on October 8 of that year.

News articles and press releases described both the construction status and the scale of the work. A Brooklyn Daily Eagle article in September 1926 stated that the building contained "nearly 31 acres [13 ha] of cinder concrete floor arches and cement floors". The Brooklyn Times-Union claimed that, if there were one person per 100 square feet (9.3 m^{2}) within the Graybar Building's 1.35 million square feet (125,000 m^{2}) of office space, the building would comprise the 43rd largest locality in New York state. (Note: The Times-Union stated that this would give a capacity of 13,500 people. The Eagle claimed the building could hold even more people, with a total capacity of 15,000.) The Eagle also published an article that described how vibrations from passing trains would be reduced by the installation of lead embedded in concrete. The brick and the cement arches and floors were installed starting in late 1926. By early 1927, some 1,100 workers were furnishing the interiors with such materials including 5,000 doors, while Edward Trumbull completed the murals in the Graybar Passage on the building's first floor. That March, the Eagle stated that the offices would be ready by April 1.

=== Use and later years ===
Upon completion, the Graybar Building was characterized as the world's largest office building, with space for over 12,000 office workers. Although the first tenants moved to the building in April 1927, the occupancy certificate was not issued until that July. All of the building's floor area had been leased by January 1928. Another $12 million in bonds, with an interest rate of 5%, would be issued in 1928. A $6.5 million loan on the building was placed with the Equitable Life Assurance Society in 1944. The loan was placed to refinance the remaining 5% bonds issued in 1928. Six years later, a 16-year, $5.6 million loan was placed on the Graybar Building by Aetna.

The Graybar Building and the nearby Chrysler Building were sold in 1953 for $52 million. The new owners were businessman William Zeckendorf's company Webb and Knapp, who held a 75% interest in the sale, and the Graysler Corporation, who held a 25% stake. At the time, it was reported to be the largest real estate sale in New York City's history. In 1957, the Chrysler Building, its annex, and the Graybar Building were sold for $66 million to Lawrence Wien's realty syndicate, setting a new record for the largest sale in the city. Webb and Knapp continued to lease the building until 1960, when the leasehold was sold to a group of 8,000 investors for over $3 million.

Graybar moved its headquarters out of the building in 1982. In 1998, SL Green Realty acquired the sublease for the building from a partnership led by businesswoman Leona Helmsley. SL Green had paid $165 million, winning the lease over other bidders such as Harry B. Macklowe, Steve Witkoff, and Andrew S. Penson. At that time, the building had a 20% vacancy rate, and SL Green planned to spend $8 million toward renovating the building. The adjacent Grand Central Terminal, including the Graybar Passage, was also being renovated at the same time. The renovations included a new entrance and lobby; the steam-cleaning of the facade; and renovated ceilings, floors, and restrooms.

The New York City Landmarks Preservation Commission (LPC) hosted public hearings in 2013 to determine whether the Graybar Building and four other structures in East Midtown should be designated as New York City landmarks. SL Green opposed a potential landmark designation for the Graybar Building and the nearby Pershing Square Building, which it also owned, saying that the designations would prevent SL Green from improving access to the Grand Central–42nd Street station. In mid-2016, the LPC proposed protecting twelve buildings in East Midtown, including the Graybar Building, in advance of proposed changes to the area's zoning. On November 22, 2016, the LPC designated the Graybar Building and ten other nearby buildings as city landmarks.

== Tenants ==
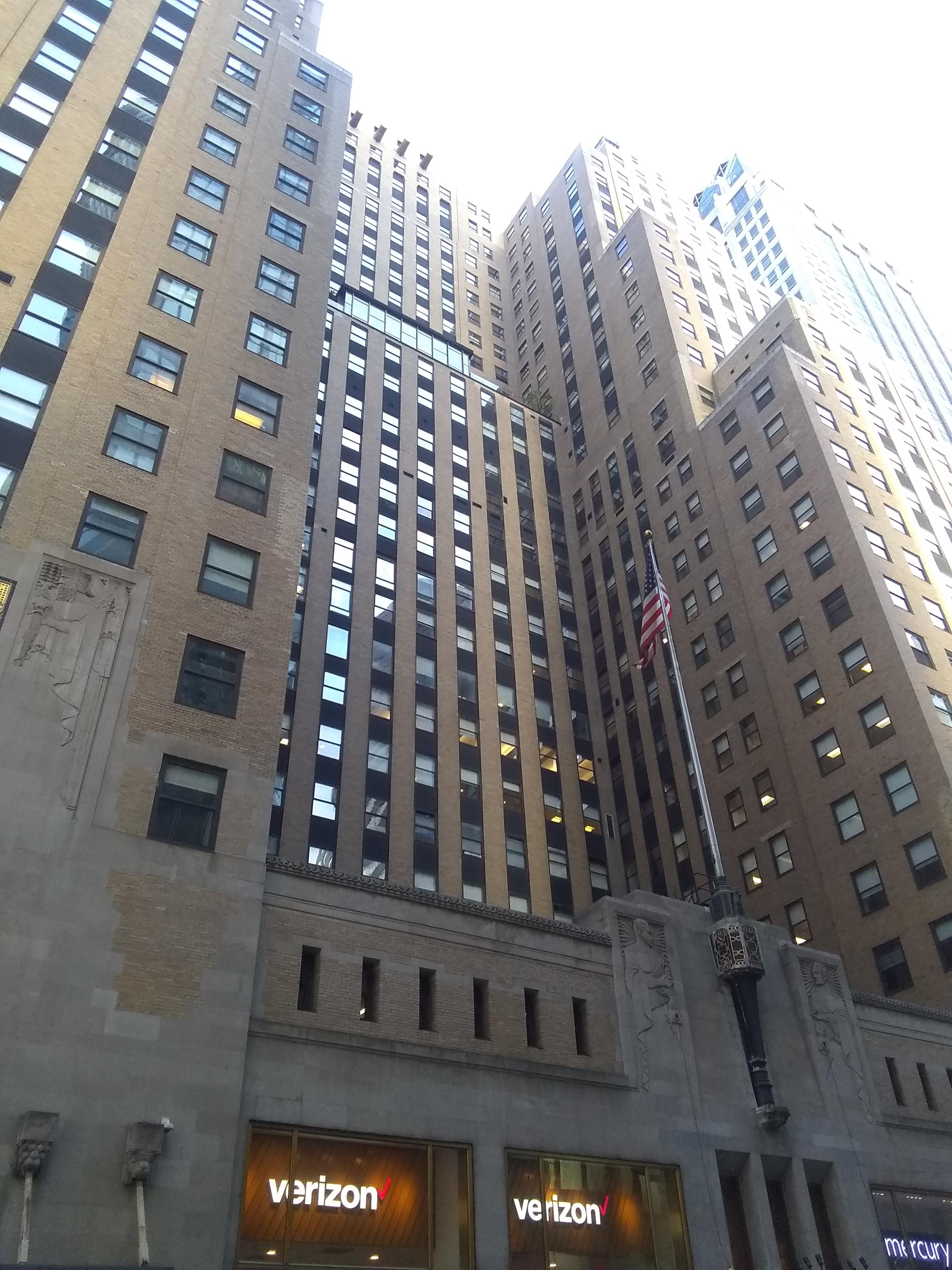
Eastern facade of the building, showing the "light court"

By 1927, all of the spaces in the Graybar Building had been rented, and according to one New York Times writer, the building's success proved that "high-class office tenants" were willing to move to Lexington Avenue. One of the earliest lessees was publisher Condé Nast, located on the 19th floor, which signed a lease in 1925. The building's namesake Graybar Electric Company occupied the 17th floor, while advertiser J. Walter Thompson leased additional space. Another tenant was a Chase Bank branch in the northern part of the ground floor, whose design excluded the enclosures for bank tellers that were present in most other commercial bank branches. The Condé Nast publications Vanity Fair, Vogue, and House & Garden also all took space in the Graybar Building. Yet other early tenants included Remington Rand, Turner Construction, YMCA, and the Associated Architects responsible in the design of Rockefeller Center. Later tenants included the New York State Division of Alcoholic Beverage Control. The Great Atlantic & Pacific Tea Company (A&P) was headquartered in the Graybar Building from the 1920s to the 1970s.

Modern tenants in the Graybar Building include the Metro-North Railroad, Metropolitan Transportation Authority, New York Life Insurance Company, and DeWitt Stern Group. In addition, its current owner SL Green occupies space in the building.

== Critical reception ==
During construction, many contemporary critics described the building's size and scale rather than its design. The Brooklyn Daily Eagle in 1926 described how the building's floor space was equivalent to the area of several blocks in Midtown if spread out onto a single surface. A writer for The New Yorker stated in November 1927 that the building was "probably the largest something, or the highest something, or the most capacious something, in the world – but we didn't know what". The New York Herald Tribune observed that if all the materials for the building were to arrive at once, it would require 4,625 freight train cars, stretching 50 miles (80 km).

Critics of the building's design tended to view it as a formidable structure. In June 1927, one Herald Tribune reader wrote a letter to that newspaper, saying that the building is "enormous, solid, lofty and of course, embodies the most modern knowledge and skill", but calling the lack of ornamentation a literal "colossal setback". In response, Herald Tribune critic S.J. Vickers said that "the simple, austere front represents the designer's efforts to symbolize still further the tremendous forces responsible for the seething giants in our big city". The magazine Brooklyn Life said in 1929 that the Graybar Building represented an "impressive beauty of steel bulk" with "severe and exotic statuary". The critic Parker Morse Hooper called the decoration "conservative" yet "unusually interesting". The architect Robert A. M. Stern, in his book New York 1930, called the Graybar Building a "quintessential commercial colossus" that symbolized "the culture of congestion".

== See also ==
- Art Deco architecture of New York City
- List of New York City Designated Landmarks in Manhattan from 14th to 59th Streets
