= Risk Strategies =

US insurance brokerage and risk management advisor

RSC Insurance Brokerage, Inc.
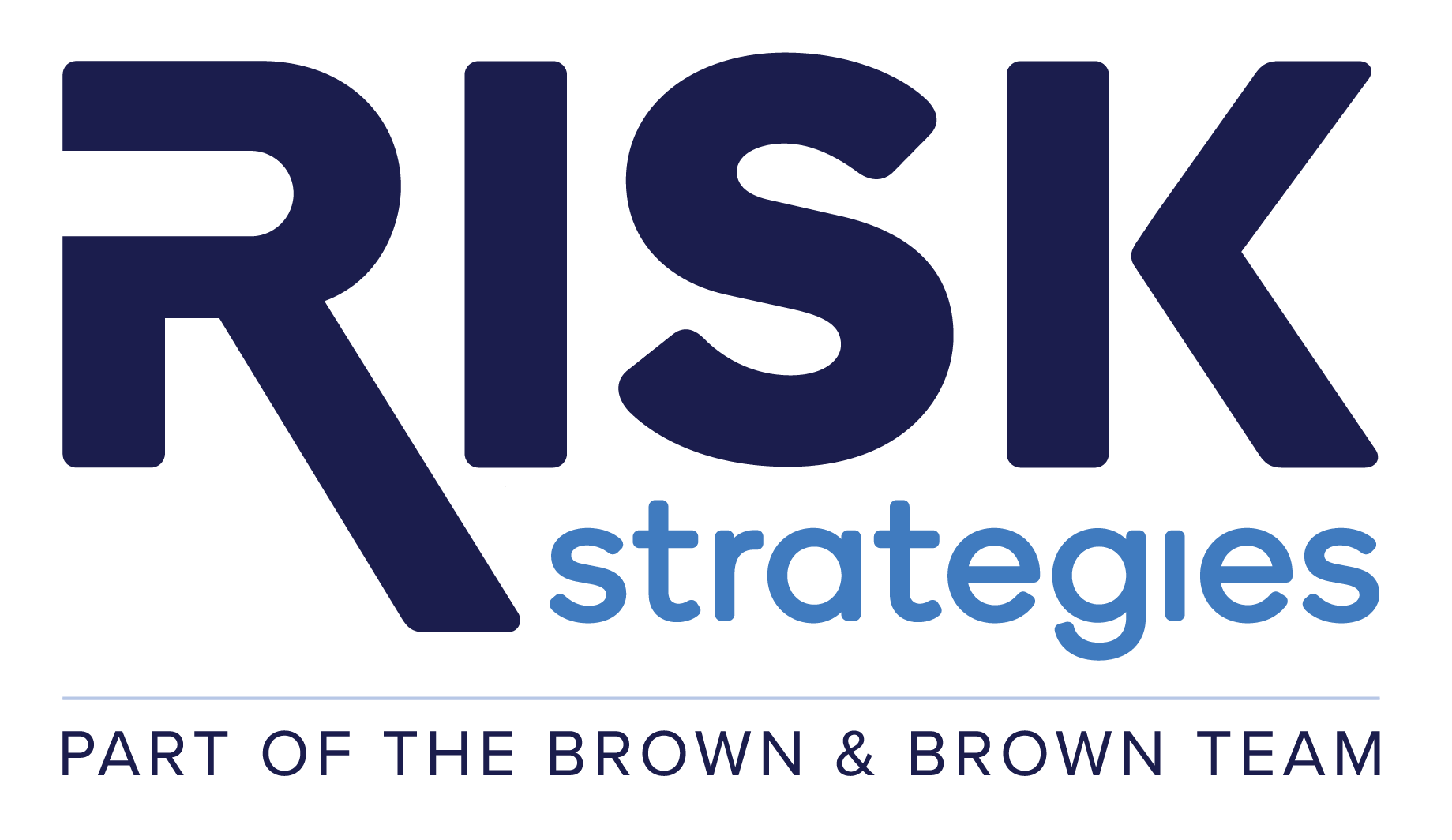

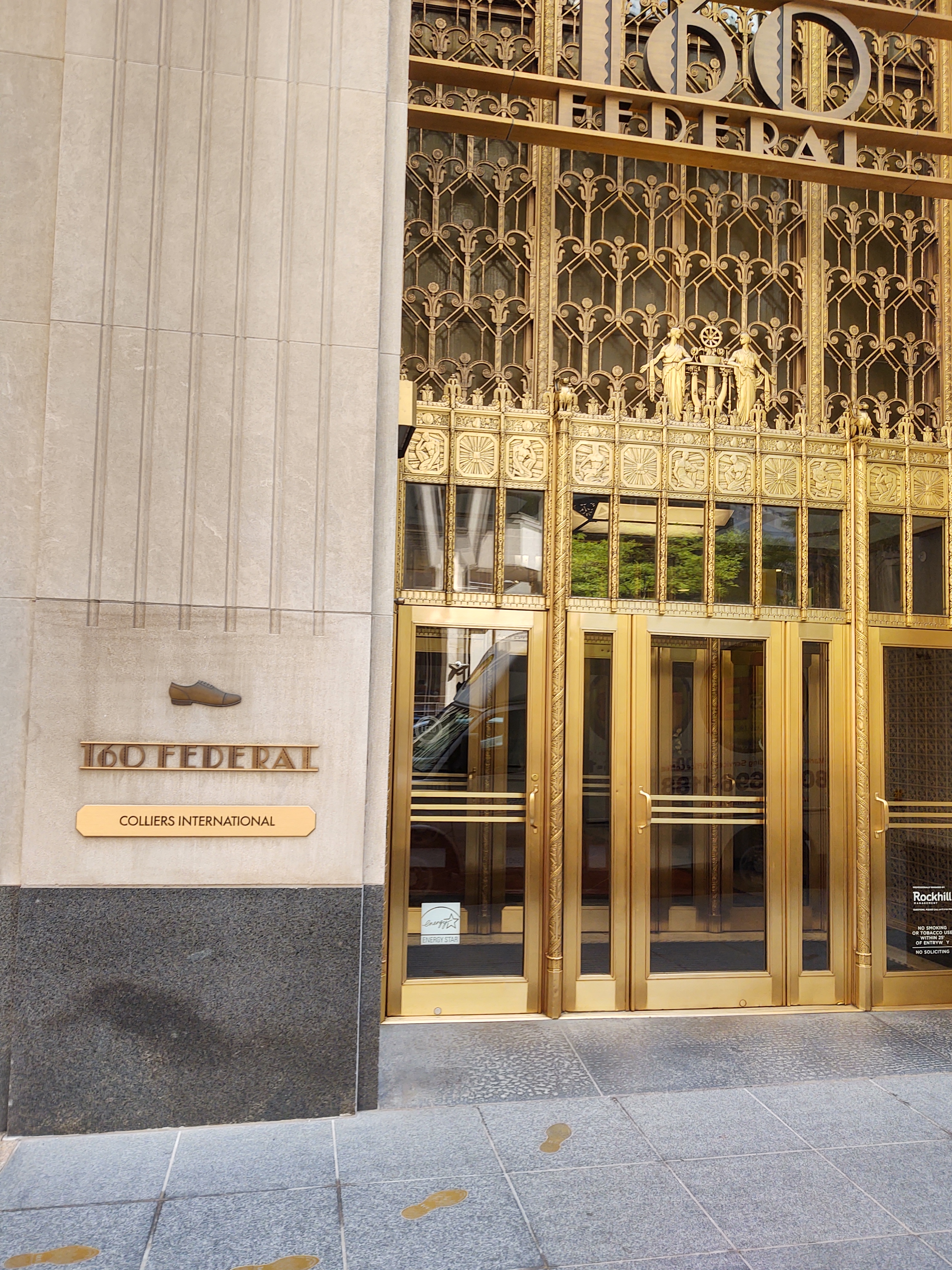
- Risk Strategies headquarters at 160 Federal Street (4th floor), Boston
- Trade name: Risk Strategies
- Company type: Private company
- Industry: Insurance
- Founded: July 28, 1997; 28 years ago Boston, Massachusetts, US
- Founders: Mike Christian
- Headquarters: Boston, Massachusetts, United States
- Area served: Worldwide
- Key people: John Mina, CEO; Mike Christian, Executive chairman
- Services: Insurance brokerage and risk management advisor
- Revenue: ▼US$1.07 billion (2023)
- Number of employees: ▲5,000 (2023)
- Website: www.risk-strategies.com

Risk Strategies (officially incorporated as RSC Insurance Brokerage, Inc.) is a private American insurance brokerage and risk management advisor. The firm was founded 1997 (28 years ago) in Boston, Massachusetts, by its current chairman, Mike Christian, as a specialty risk management consultancy.

In 2015, private equity insurance sector investor Kelso & Company acquired Kohlberg & Company's majority stake in Risk Strategies.

In 2022 it was ranked the 25th fastest-growing private company in Massachusetts.

Risk Strategies was acquired by the Brown & Brown team on August 1, 2025.

== History ==
Risk Strategies was founded by Mike Christian in 1997 to provide risk management advice to upper middle market commercial clients, with a focus on private equity and healthcare. In 2000, it made its first acquisition of Andrew Anthony and Associates. By 2001, the company had 15 employees.

In 2002, Risk Strategies expanded as an insurance brokerage to provide clients with specialized coverages and alternative risk financing programs. By the end of 2006, Risk Strategies was licensed in 48 states.

A minority investment from WR Berkley enabled expansion into the Midwest and California markets as well as new practice areas and market categories.

In 2013, Kohlberg & Company, L.L.C, a private equity firm, acquired a majority interest in Risk Strategies. The new investment helped Risk Strategies expand into new markets and products. As of 2013, Risk Strategies had 10 offices, 120 employees, and $40 million in revenue.

With access to investment capital, Risk Strategies pursued acquisitions and hires across specialty industries. In 2014, Risk Strategies made its largest acquisition to date by acquiring, DeWitt Stern, a specialist in the Entertainment, Media, Private Client, and Fine Art insurance sectors. With this acquisition, Risk Strategies was considered a Top 35 broker nationally, with nearly $100 million in revenue and almost 400 employees nationwide.

In 2015, Kelso & Company acquired Kohlberg & Company's majority stake in Risk Strategies. In 2016, Risk Strategies entered Texas for the first time with the acquisition of A&E specialist Mclaughlin Brunson and Florida with Atlass Insurance Brokerage Group.

From 2014 to 2016 Risk Strategies made 22 acquisitions, and expanded into Louisiana, Maryland, Ohio, and Pennsylvania.

In 2019, then President John Mina was named chief executive officer Mina succeeded Michael Christian, Risk Strategies founder, and long-time CEO, who moved to the Executive chairman role.

In 2019, One80 Intermediaries, a wholesale brokerage was formed.

On December 1, 2022, Risk Strategies announced the formation of Risk Strategies Consulting. This action merged key acquisitions made by Risk Strategies - including Corporate Benefit Audits (2018), United Health Actuarial Services (2019), Centric Actuarial Solutions (2021), Cambridge Advisory Group (2021), and recently announced Aquarius Capital Solutions (2022) – into a single business unit operating independently from the firm’s brokerage business. At launch, Risk Strategies Consulting offered services around actuarial analysis, healthcare claim auditing, health and welfare, mergers and acquisitions, pharmacy, and retirement benefits.

In October 2023, Accession Risk Management Group was announced as the parent brand of Risk Strategies and One80 Intermediaries.

RSC Topco, Inc., including the brands Risk Strategies and One80 Intermediaries, was acquired by the Brown & Brown team on August 1, 2025.

== Services ==
Services of Risk Strategies include:

- Business Insurance
- Employee Benefits
- Private Client Services
- Risk Management Services
- Consulting

== Acquisitions ==
Major acquisitions include:

- Krauter & Company
- Gowrie Group
- DeWitt Stern
- Dubraski & Associates
- Academic Health Plans (AHP)
- UNIRISC
- ProSafety
- Brightstone
- Gehring Group
- Thomas McGee
- First Insurance Group
- Johnson Financial Group
- Hugh Wood Inc. (US) and Hugh Wood Canada Limited

== Recognition ==
- Best Places to Work, each year 2018 to 2022 by Business Insurance Magazine.
- 16th Largest Broker of US Business by Business Insurance Magazine
- 9th Largest Privately Owned Broker by Business Insurance Magazine
- Ranked 2,374 on the Inc. 5000 list in 2021,
- Ranked 2,872 on the Inc. 5000 list in 2022.

== Publications ==
Open access publications of Risk Strategies include:

- 2024 State of the Market
- 2023 Cyber Liability: Building Cyber Resilience in a Complex World
- Employee Benefits Evolve Alongside Shifting Workforce Needs
- The Ultimate Guide to Captive Insurance Companies
