= Brown & Brown =

American insurance company

Brown & Brown, Inc.
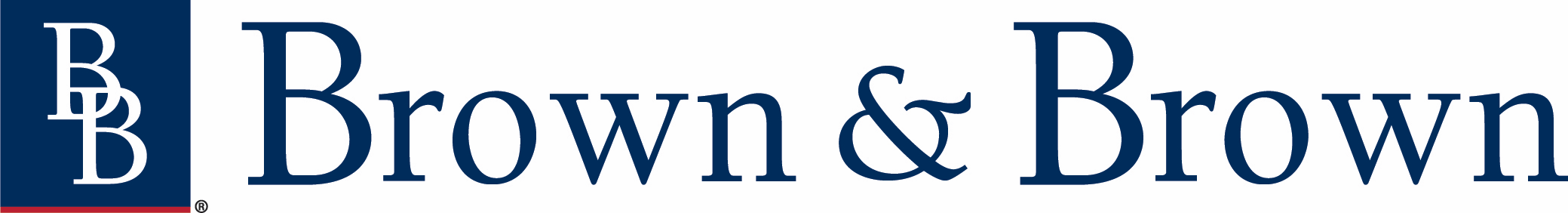
- Trade name: Brown & Brown
- Type: Public company
- Traded as: NYSE: BRO; S&P 500 component
- ISIN: US1152361010
- Industry: Property & casualty insurance
- Founded: 1939; 87 years ago
- Headquarters: Daytona Beach, Florida, U.S.
- Key people: J. Powell Brown (President & CEO); J. Hyatt Brown (chairman)
- Revenue: ▲US$5.9 billion (2025)
- Net income: ▲US$1 billion (2025)
- Total assets: ▲US$30.0 billion (2025)
- Total equity: ▲US$12.6 billion (2025)
- Owner: J. Hyatt Brown, J. Powell Brown, P. Barrett Brown: 12.6%'
- Number of employees: 22,888 (2026)
- Website: bbrown.com

Brown & Brown, Inc. is an American insurance brokerage firm headquartered in Daytona Beach, Florida. It is one of the largest independent insurance intermediaries in the United States, providing risk management solutions, insurance products, and services to businesses, governmental institutions, professional organizations, trade associations, and individuals.

As of 2026, Brown & Brown ranked 5th among the largest insurance brokerages globally by revenue as ranked by Business Insurance.

== History ==
Brown & Brown was founded in 1939 as a small insurance agency in Daytona Beach, Florida, by J. Adrian Brown, partnering with his cousin Charles "Cov" Owen. Originally named Brown & Owen, the firm quickly expanded its customer base in central Florida. J. Adrian's son, J. Hyatt Brown, joined the agency in 1959, bought the company and became CEO in 1961, and played a key role in its growth and modernization.

In 1980, Brown & Brown restructured to adopt a decentralized model, aiming to boost revenue and profit margins by giving more authority to local teams. This approach encouraged an entrepreneurial culture across the company.

In 1983, the firm changed its name to Brown & Brown, Inc. to reflect its focus on national expansion.

In 1993, the company merged with Poe & Associates. Also in 1993, the company went public, listing on the New York Stock Exchange under the ticker symbol BRO. The use of public stock for acquisitions enabled a deliberate expansion strategy focused on acquiring middle-market insurance brokers nationwide.

J. Hyatt Brown retired as CEO in 2009, but remains with the company as chairman. He was succeeded as CEO by his son J. Powell Brown. Subsequently, the company has pursued aggressive acquisition strategies and organic growth. It surpassed $1 billion in revenue in 2012. It joined the S&P 500 index in 2021.

In 2021, new headquarters were completed at Daytona Beach, Florida, featuring an 11-story building on 13 acres facing the Halifax River.

In 2021, Brown & Brown was added to the S&P 500 index following an announcement by S&P Dow Jones Indices, effective September 20, 2021.

In 2022, Brown & Brown was added to the S&P 500 Dividend Aristocrats Index, which includes S&P 500 companies that have increased their dividend payments for at least 25 consecutive years.

In 2023, Brown & Brown received the Platinum Bell Seal for Workplace Mental Health from Mental Health America for its workplace mental health initiatives.

== Services ==
Brown & Brown operates through two major business segments:

- Retail: Offers property and casualty insurance and employee benefits products to commercial, public, and individual customers.
- Arrowhead Intermediaries: A purpose-built platform with three distinct divisions, each serving the evolving needs of insurance carriers, brokers, and customers worldwide:
  - Programs
  - Wholesale
  - Specialty divisions

The company serves customers in all 50 U.S. states and in select international markets.

== Financial performance ==
For fiscal year 2025, Brown & Brown reported total revenues of US$5.9 billion, an increase of 22.8% compared with 2024.

During 2025, the company completed 43 acquisitions representing approximately US$1.8 billion of annualized revenues.

The company reported cash flows from operating activities of approximately US$1.8 billion and total cash flow of approximately US$1.5 billion for the year.

== Acquisitions ==
Brown & Brown has grown significantly through strategic acquisitions. Notable acquisitions include:

- Hays Companies (2018) – A major employee benefits and risk management firm based in Minneapolis.
- CoverHound and CyberPolicy (2021) – Digital platforms offering small business and personal lines insurance.
- Orchid Underwriters and CrossCover Insurance Services (2023) – Expanded the company's E&S (excess and surplus) capabilities.
- Global Risk Partners (GRP) (2022) – A major U.K.-based insurance intermediary, marking a significant expansion into the European market.
- O’Leary Insurances (2021) – A comprehensive insurance broking service based in Ireland. The acquisition marked Brown & Brown’s strategic entry into the EU market.
- McNamara Company (2024) – Offers a range of insurance solutions for businesses, families, and individuals.
- Accession Risk Management Group, including Risk Strategies (2025) – A private American insurance brokerage and risk management advisor. This acquisition expanded Brown & Brown’s presence in property and casualty, employee benefits, and middle-market broker services. The acquisition added more than 5,000 employees.
- MacKay Corporate Insurance Brokers (2026) – A commercial and personal insurance broker based in Scotland. The acquisition marked Brown & Brown’s strategic entry into the Scotland market.

== Recognition ==
- Great Place to Work certified.
- Ranked No. 5 of the World’s 10 Largest Insurance Brokers.

== Publications ==
- Global Impact Report – Published annually, covering the company’s ESG (Environmental, Social, and Governance) priorities, including teammates, communities, the environment, and governance.
- Annual reports
- News releases and press announcements – Including acquisitions, dividend announcements, earnings results, and strategic initiatives.

== See also ==
- List of United States insurance companies
- Insurance broker
- Risk management
