= Kathleen Mazzarella =

President of Graybar Electri

- Education: Webster University
- Occupation: Businesswoman
- Title: Chief executive and president, Graybar Electric Co.

Kathleen Mazzarella has been the chief executive and president of Graybar Electric Co. since June 1, 2012. She has been the chairwoman of Graybar Electric Co. since January 1, 2013. As of May 2020, she was one of only 37 female CEOs on the Fortune 500.

Mazzarella started with Graybar in 1980 as a customer service representative. She progressed through various sales positions and then moved to field sales management roles. Soon after her first management assignment, she was promoted to national product manager, and later served in other executive-level positions. She was named executive vice president and chief operating officer in 2010, and president and CEO in 2012. She was named chairwoman of the board of directors in 2013.

== Education ==
Mazzarella has an associate's degree in telecommunications engineering. She has a Bachelor of Arts in Applied Behavioral Sciences and a master's degree in business from Webster University, which she earned in 2002.

== Board memberships ==
In January 2015, Mazzarella joined the board of directors of the Federal Reserve Bank of St. Louis as a Class C director. She became deputy chair in January 2016, and chair in April 2016. She was elected to the Waste Management Board of Directors effective October 1, 2015. She was elected to the board of Express Scripts in June 2017, and joined the board of Cigna Corporation when it merged with Express Scripts in December 2018. She was elected to the board of Core & Main LP in 2019. She also serves on the boards of Alliance STL, and the Saint Louis Club, as well as on the Webster University Business and Technology Advisory Board. In July 2016, she became an active member of The Business Council. She is a member of Vistage Worldwide, Inc., the International Women's Forum, the Committee of 200, the American Cancer Society's CEOs Against Cancer of Missouri, and Civic Progress.

== Awards and recognition ==
Mazzarella's business achievements and community involvement helped her earn several recognitions, including the St. Louis "40 Under 40" award in 2000 and a "Most Influential Businesswomen in St. Louis" award in 2004.

Her views on human resources strategy were included as a chapter in Inside the Minds, a book featuring interviews with top HR practitioners across the United States. She was featured as one of the "Women Worth Watching in 2010" in the September/October 2009 issue of Profiles in Diversity Journal.

Mazzarella has been the driving force behind the establishment of a women's networking group at Graybar and in promoting careers for women in the wholesale distribution industry. In 2011, she received the Outstanding Alumna Award from the George Herbert Walker School of Business & Technology at Webster University. In 2014, Mazzarella was recognized by the Urban League of Metropolitan St. Louis as one of its distinguished women in leadership. In 2015, she earned the Women in Industry Trailblazer Award from the National Association of Electrical Distributors, and was recognized as a Leader of Distinction by the YWCA of Metro St. Louis. In 2019, she was honored as a Junior Achievement Business Hall of Fame laureate.
