= Graybar =

American electronics distribution company

Graybar Electric Company, Inc.
- Type: Private
- Industry: Distribution
- Founded: 1869; 157 years ago
- Founder: Elisha Gray; Enos M. Barton
- Headquarters: Clayton, Missouri, U.S.
- Number of locations: 345 (2023)
- Key people: Kathleen Mazzarella (Chairman, President and CEO)
- Products: Electrical equipment; Telecommunications equipment; Networking hardware
- Revenue: ▲US$11 billion (2023)
- Operating income: ▼US$637.3 million (2023)
- Net income: ▲US$463.4 million (2023)
- Total assets: ▲US$4 billion (2023)
- Total equity: ▲US$1.9 billion (2023)
- Number of employees: 9,500 (2023)
- Website: graybar.com

Graybar Electric Company, Inc. is an American wholesale electrical, communications and data networking products distribution business, which also supplies related supply-chain management and logistics services. The company is based in Clayton, Missouri and is an employee-owned corporation.

Graybar was incorporated on December 11, 1925, as the successor company of the general electric supply business of the Western Electric Company, which was founded in 1869 in Cleveland, Ohio, by Elisha Gray and Enos M. Barton. The separation of product lines was intended to provide a separate identity from the telephone supply function of Western Electric to the Bell System, given its importance as the largest merchandiser of electrical apparatus and related equipment in the world in the 1920s.

== History ==
=== Early history ===
During the post–Civil War Reconstruction Era, entrepreneur Enos M. Barton (who had served as a telegrapher during the war) worked for Western Union in Rochester, New York. During this period, Barton met George Shawk, the foreman of the company's Cleveland, Ohio shop. When that shop was closed down, Shawk bought some of the equipment and went into business for himself, making various kinds of electrical and other apparatus, including inventor's models. While on a trip to Rochester, he and Barton, who was then 26, agreed to go into partnership.

To raise the $400 her son needed for his share of the business venture, Barton's widowed mother mortgaged her home.

The new firm, located at 93 St. Clair Street in Cleveland, grew. In May 1869, Elisha Gray, an Oberlin College professor and inventor of telegraphic equipment, bought out Shawk's interest.

Up until then, Gray had been one of the firm's top customers. He had invented a needle annunciator for hotels and elevators, a telautograph (a machine for the electrical transmission of writing), and the telegraph answer-back call box. Gray and Barton joined forces with an investment of $2,500 each, with Gray as the senior partner. The success of the new company attracted the attention of General Anson Stager, general superintendent of the Western Union Telegraph Company. He offered to enter the business as an equal partner with Gray and Barton, providing the company's headquarters was moved from Cleveland to Chicago, Illinois. In December 1869, the company moved to 162 S. Water Street, Chicago. The Great Chicago Fire in 1871 came within two blocks of its small plant.

The destruction caused by the fire resulted in greater growth for Gray & Barton, as the company sold fire alarms and helped rebuild the Western Union infrastructure in the city.

=== Incorporation as Western Electric ===
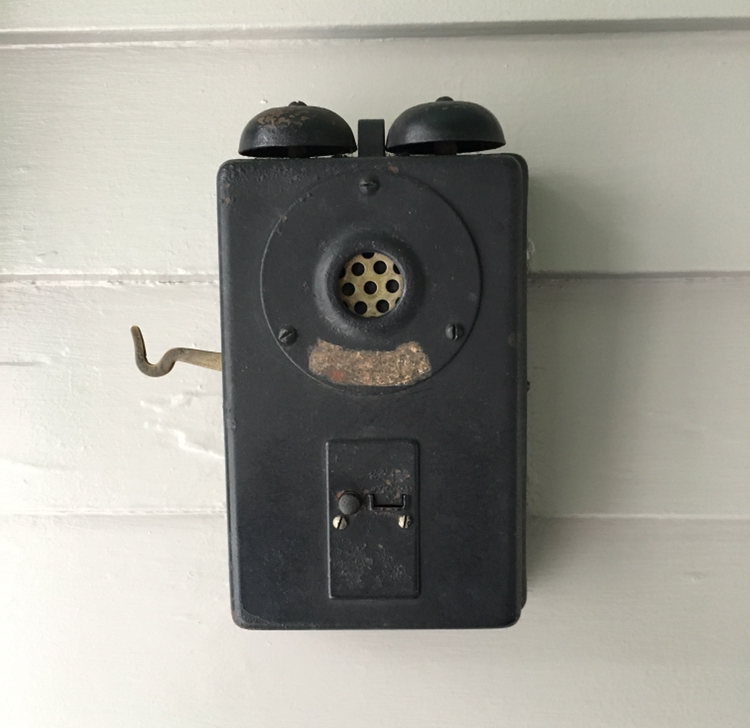
Graybar Electric internal call system preserved at Edison and Ford Winter Estates

After several relocations, all in Chicago, the business was incorporated as the Western Electric Manufacturing Company in 1872 to meet the capital requirements of the telegraph supply business. The new company so closely allied with the elder Western that three of its five directors were Western Union executives. Moreover, Stager was named president, although it was Barton as secretary/treasurer who actually handled day-to-day affairs.

Although the young firm thrived in the telegraph industry, it was not until the invention of the telephone by Alexander Graham Bell in 1876, and the incandescent lamp by Thomas Alva Edison in 1879, that Western Electric began to gain stature as a large company.

Part-owner Gray held the title of company electrician and spent his days working on his inventions, becoming increasingly less involved in the operations of the shop, and eventually he sold his interest in Western Electric in 1875 and retired to pursue independent research and to teach at Oberlin College. In 1876, he filed a caveat with the U.S. Patent Office, announcing his intention to soon patent an invention that would transmit vocal sounds telegraphically. Gray dubbed his telephone "the harmonic telegraph". Only hours earlier, however, Alexander Graham Bell applied for a patent for the same idea, which became known as the telephone. As it turned out, what Bell actually patented would have never worked, while Gray's idea would have. Western Union acquired both Gray's and Edison's telephone patents to challenge the American Bell Telephone Company (renamed AT&T in 1899), which led to a patent infringement suit and Bell ultimately being named the inventor of the telephone. Therefore it was Bell's patent and not Gray's that launched the telecommunications industry.

As applications of electricity broadened, Western Electric not only sold the electric bells and batteries, telegraph keys, fire alarm boxes and hotel annunciators it originally manufactured, but also many items it purchased from other manufacturers.

Stager served as president of Western Electric until shortly before his death in 1885, and Barton then served as president from 1886 to 1908.

Western Electric Company was the first company to join in a Japanese joint venture with foreign capital. It invested in Nippon Electric Company in 1899. Western Electric held 54% of NEC at the time. Their representative in Japan was Walter Tenney Carleton.

By the turn of the century, Western Electric had become the main producer of telephone equipment in the United States. It also manufactured arc lamps, lighting equipment and power apparatus, ranging from small fans to huge motors and generators. Alongside manufacturing, the distribution business continued to grow, handling an extensive line of electrical supplies such as wire, conduit, wiring devices and pole line material.

By the 1910s, the company became the world's largest distributor and the United States' leading wholesaler of electrical supplies. These facts attracted investment by the American Bell Telephone Company, which also discovered that Gray and Barton could purchase supplies and sell them to the telephone companies more efficiently than the companies could acquire the supplies themselves.

A chain of warehouses was established across the nation, and the growth of the distributing business continued to increase through World War I and into the post-war period.

=== Formation of Graybar ===
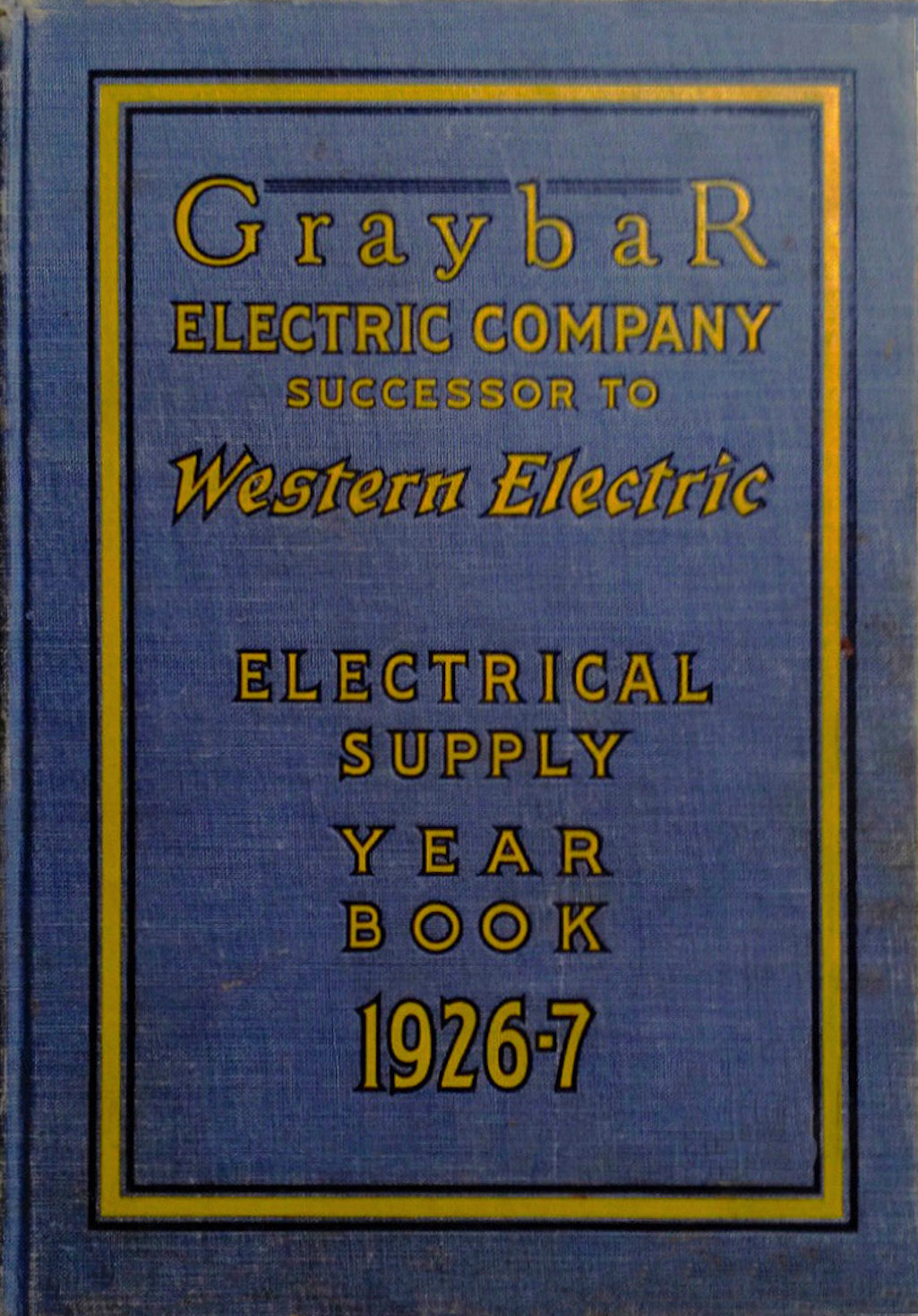
Cover of the first Graybar merchandizing catalog for the years 1926/1927, after division from Western Electric Company

On December 31, 1920, the supply department of Western Electric was divided by forming operating divisions for general electrical supplies and telephone equipment. In 1923, the general supply business opened separate general offices in the newly constructed Pershing Square Building in New York City.

Scores of electrical supply manufacturers were using the company's distribution network, and business relationships were formed. Some of these relationships, such as with General Electric and the Square D Company, are more than a century old and still exist today. Having become the largest merchandizer of electrical supplies in the world and close to fifty distributing houses in the United States, the division was incorporated as a separate entity on December 11, 1925, with the name Graybar Electric Company, in honor of Western's original founders, Elisha Gray and Enos Barton.

Albert Salt, in the 1920s, was Western Electric's vice president of purchasing and became responsible for leading Graybar and established Graybar's first New York corporate office in the Graybar Building, the world's largest office building, adjoining Grand Central Terminal.

On January 1, 1927, Western Electric's holdings in Graybar were transferred to Electric Research Holdings, a Western Electric company. In 1928, the Graybar Management Corporation, held by Graybar employees, was created to purchase Graybar from the Western Electric Company.

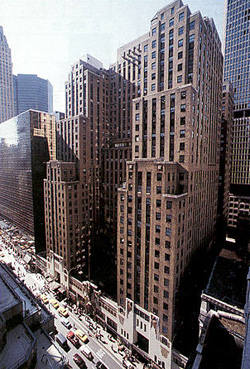
Graybar's corporate headquarters were located at the Graybar Building in New York City from 1927 until 1982.

During the 1930s, the company explored many avenues of income, including a line of appliances and sewing machines under the Graybar brand. By 1941 the company's sales volume was more than $100 million, the number of distribution houses had jumped to 86, and there was a corresponding increase in personnel. Also that year, the remaining outstanding shares of stock were purchased from Western Electric with a $1 million check signed by Graybar President Frank A. Ketcham.

When the country entered World War II, Graybar's ingenuity and knowledge of logistics proved to be of immeasurable value in providing war-needed goods. Graybar became a vital link between America's manufacturers and America's defense needs. Defense-related business continued in the postwar era, with Graybar again aiding the military during the subsequent Korean War and Vietnam War. Overall the company enjoyed strong growth in the years following World War II, its momentum not checked until the recession of the mid-1970s, which led to Graybar slashing its workforce by 20%. As a result, when economic conditions improved in the 1980s Graybar was unable to gear up quickly enough to meet the rising demand for electrical products.

The corporate headquarters moved from the Graybar Building in New York City to Clayton, Missouri, in 1982.

=== 1980s and 1990s ===
Graybar modernized its infrastructure with one of the first computer-to-computer ordering systems; however, a weak real estate market led to a slowdown in construction and affected the company's bottom line. When the economy recovered in the early 1990s, business improved. Around the same time, Graybar led a movement within the industry to standardize bar coding. These efforts led to Graybar employees having seats on different industry committees working on standards for electronic data interchange (EDI), vendor-managed inventory (VMI), and the Industry Data Warehouse (IDW).

In 1995, Graybar formed the Solutions Providers Alliance with wholesale distributors Kaman Industrial Technologies, WWR Scientific Products, and Vallen Corporation. That same year Graybar was realigned into two business groups, one focused on electrical supplies and the other on comm/data business. Prior to this change, in 1991, the comm/data market accounted for 17% of Graybar sales. After this change, growth in this market significantly impacted Graybar's business, and by 1999 sales totaled 38%.

In 1992, Graybar acquired Ellis & Howard expanding its business into Canada. Then, in 1997, the company acquired Harris & Roome Supply Ltd. when it became majority stakeholder after having purchased an interest 6 years prior. In 2000, Graybar combined these two subsidiaries into what is still known today as Graybar Canada.

=== Early 2000s ===
In 2000 Graybar saw revenues improve to $5.2 billion, and net income exceeded $66.2 million.

In 2001, Graybar opened its eleventh of 16 planned regional distribution centers. Each regional center maintained inventory of electrical, communications, data supplies and equipment. This inventory enabled Graybar to ship orders to 98% of its customers within 24 hours. To further expand its nationwide distribution centers, Graybar placed a $100 million bond offering in the summer of 2001. This was the largest financing effort in its history.

In 2002, Graybar acquired Frank A. Blesso, Inc., and selected SAP America's mySap.com e-business platform to run its business systems applications. This included programs such as customer relationship management, supply chain management, human resources, and business intelligence.

The company saw considerable growth in 2003. That year Graybar's ERP program, launched with IBM, SAP, and Deloitte Consulting, linked Graybar's then-network of 250 branch, zone, and district facilities in the U.S. The program won Graybar a 2003 InfoWorld 100 award.

Additionally, the company acquired Monroe Contractors Electrical Supply, Inc. and the All-Phase Electric Supply location in Eugene, Oregon. 2003 was also the year that Graybar made one of its largest purchases with the acquisition of Splane Electric Supply.

Graybar's strategy was successful, and revenues increased over the next several years.

=== 2010-Present ===
Now, Graybar operates a network of locations throughout the United States, Canada and Puerto Rico. The company distributes electrical, communications, and data networking products and related supply chain management and logistics services, and has a growing industrial automation platform.

In 2017, Graybar started an innovation lab at the University of Illinois in Champaign, Illinois.

In 2019, Graybar marked 150 years since the company's original founding, and 90 years of employee ownership. To celebrate, the company announced its Empowering Our Communities program, which includes a matching program for employee charitable donations and a paid workday for employees to volunteer.

In January 2020, the company announced the Graybar Construction Trades Scholarship for high school students planning to enroll in a community college or trade school upon high school graduation. Through the scholarship, Graybar hopes to increase awareness of careers in the construction trades.

== Acquisitions ==
- 2015: Advantage Industrial Automation
- 2016: Cape Electrical Supply
- 2020: Shingle & Gibb Automation
- 2021: Steven Engineering
- 2021: Metro Electric Supply
- 2022: Walker Industrial
- 2022: Connexion
- 2023: Valin Corporation
- 2023: Shepherd Electric Supply
- 2024: Blazer Electric Supply

== Financials ==
In 1995, Graybar made the Fortune 500 list for the first time. The list ranks the biggest companies in the United States by revenue. Graybar had over $2 billion in revenue at the time.

Graybar then reached $3 billion in revenue in 1996, $4 billion in 1999, and $5 billion in 2000. The company surpassed $6 billion in revenue in 2015.

Year	Revenue
2019	$7.5 billion
2020	$7.3 billion
2021	$8.8 billion
2022	$10.5 billion
2023	$11 billion

== See also ==
- Graybar Electric Company Building (Detroit, Michigan)
