= M42 (sub-basement) =

Electrical substation in Grand Central Terminal, New York City

Coordinates: 40°45′9″N 73°58′33″W

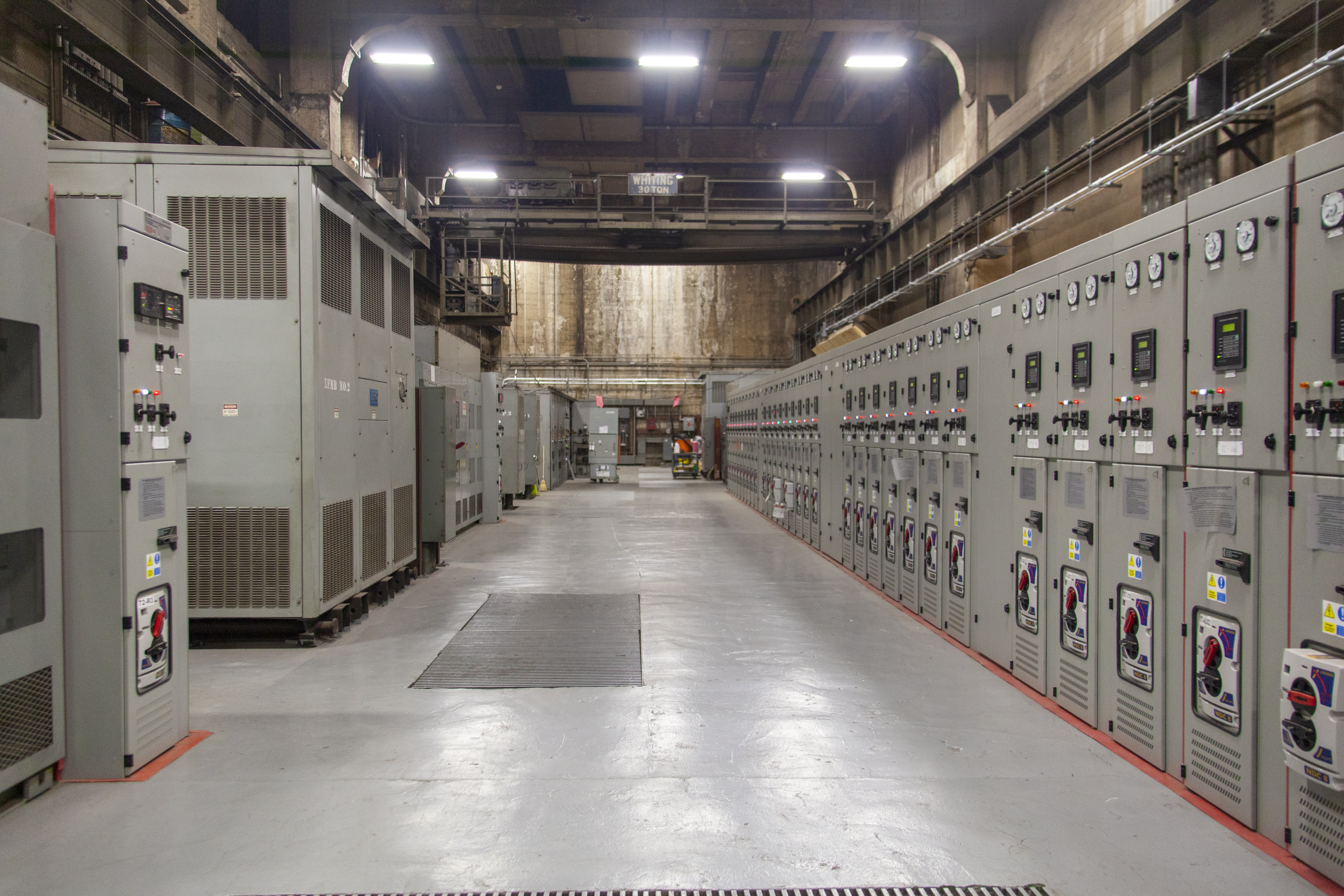
Machinery and overhead crane in the M42 sub-basement, facing west

M42 is a sub-basement of Grand Central Terminal in Midtown Manhattan, New York City. The basement contains an electrical substation that provides electricity to the terminal and helps power its tracks' third rails.

The facility opened in 1918 as a steam plant; the closest electrical substation at the time was at 50th Street. In 1929, New York Central closed the 50th Street location and reconstructed the basement facility, opening it in February 1930. It fell into obscurity for several decades, until tours were held and media was written in the 21st century focusing on the space.

== Site and surrounding facilities ==
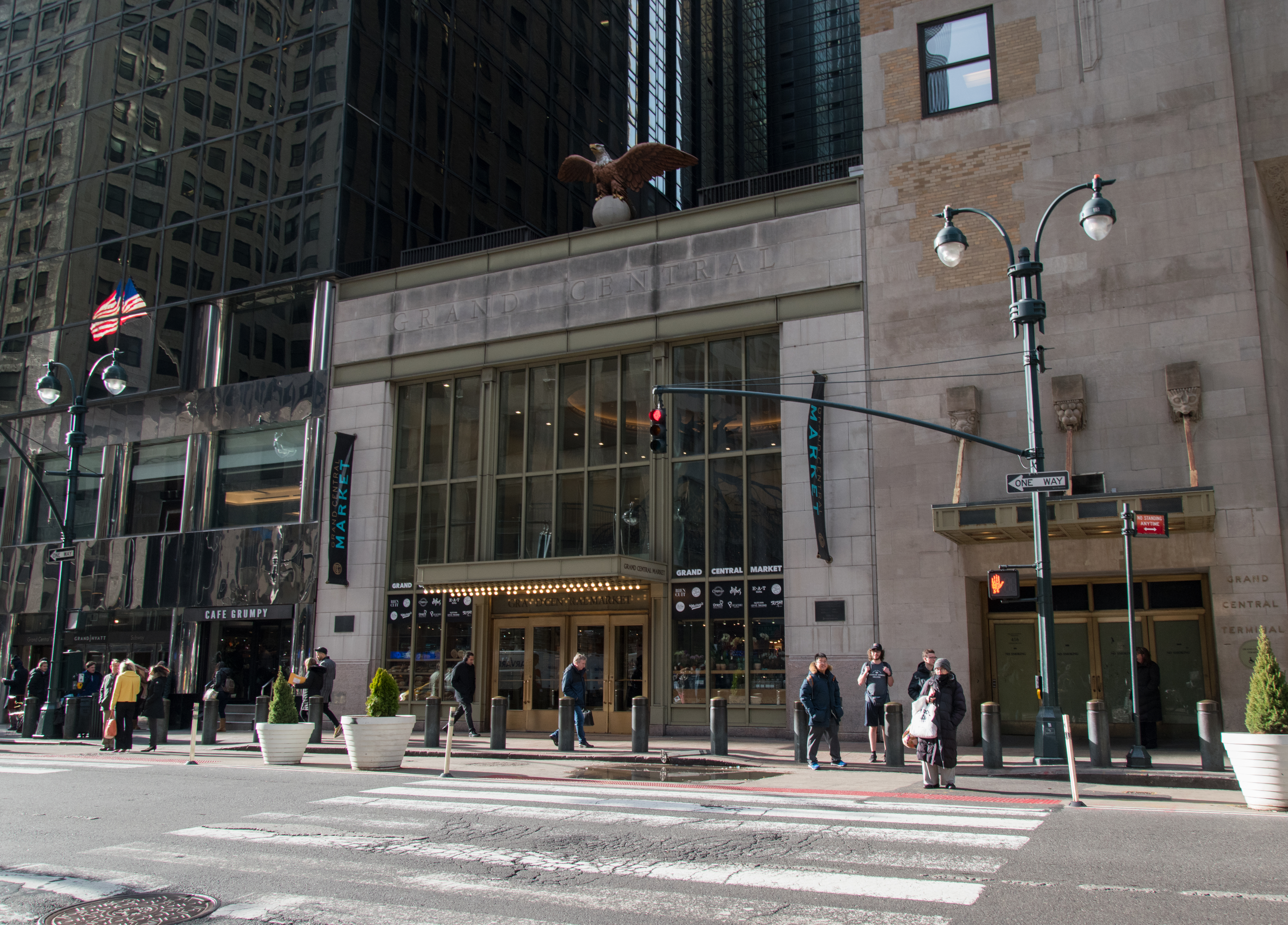
Grand Central Market's Lexington Avenue facade between the Grand Hyatt New York and Graybar Building

The M42 sub-basement is in an underground section of Grand Central Terminal in Midtown Manhattan, New York City. It is part of the station's 48-acre (19 ha) basements, together among the largest in the city. The M42 basement was installed in the former boiler facility excavated in the bedrock beneath the present-day Grand Central Market and the entrance to the Graybar Building, three levels below the lower Metro-North level. Though sources vary on its exact depth, it is thought to be located 105 to 109 feet (32 to 33 m) below ground, or either 10 or 13 stories deep. It is considered the deepest basement in New York City, deeper than at the World Trade Center or Federal Reserve Bank of New York. However, the new Grand Central LIRR terminal is in areas deeper, descending more than 175 feet (53 m) below street level at its lowest point.

The space just above the substation, originally built as a steam supply metering room, has ventilating fans that circulate air throughout the substation, with exhaust air funneled through the Grand Hyatt hotel's smokestack. The former coal bunker space, located above the ventilating room and right below street-level, now houses a backup battery, moved from the 50th Street Plant. In a nearby underground facility just to the north, Substation 1B provides DC power to the Graybar Building and Grand Hyatt. The facility opened in 1927 with four 2,000-kW rotary converters and an adjacent battery room.

The space is accessed by a single elevator and staircase. According to a reporter for The Poughkeepsie Journal, the staircase is inconspicuously placed in a public corridor and dug straight out of the underlying bedrock. M42's precise location is not listed on any blueprints.

== Equipment ==
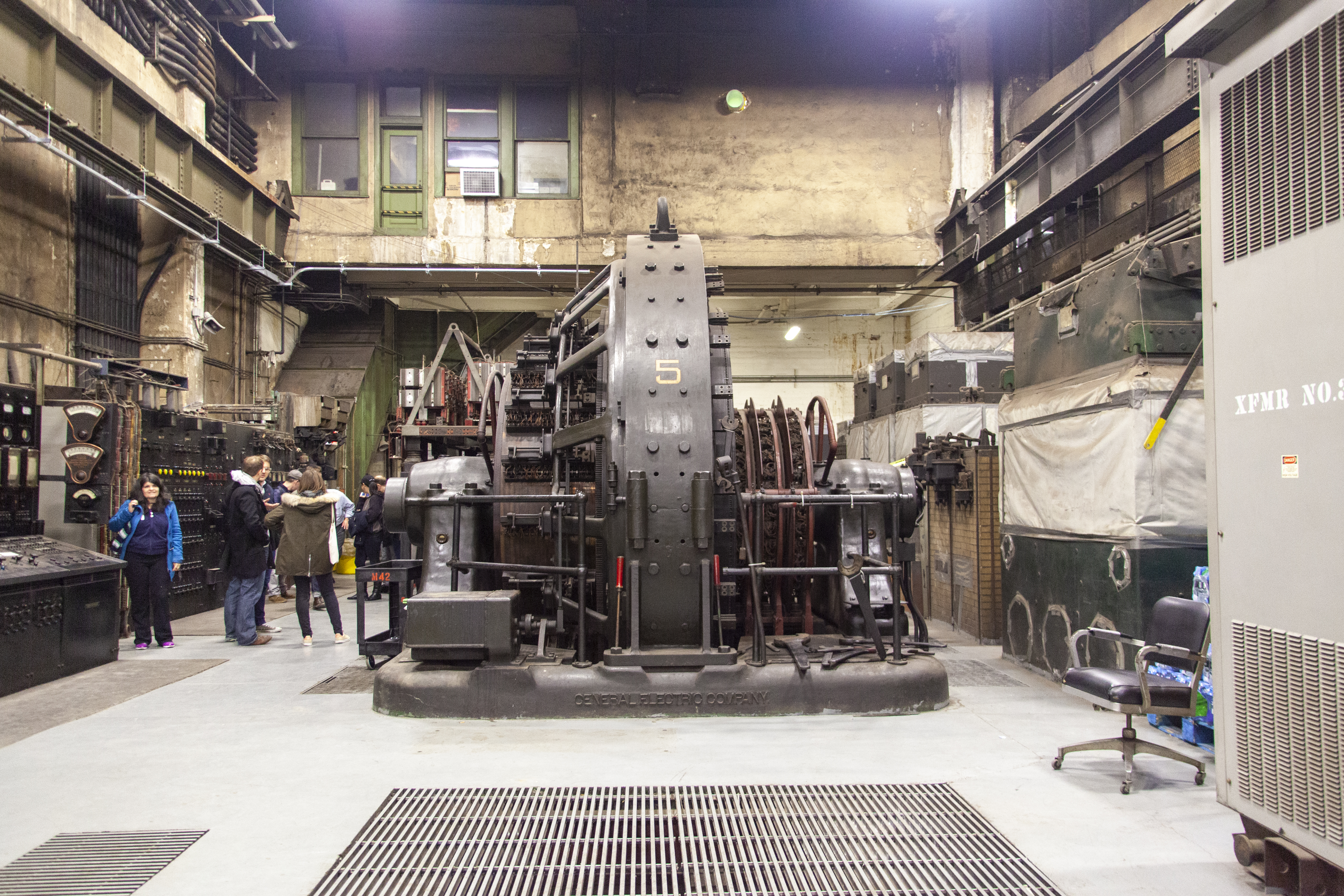
Rotary converter relic on the east end of the M42 basement

The basement contains an electrical substation with AC-to-DC converters that has provided electricity to the terminal and to power its tracks' third rails. The substation is divided into substation 1T on the eastern half of the room, which provides 16,500 kilowatts (22,100 hp) for third-rail power, and substation 1L on the western half, which provides 8,000 kilowatts (11,000 hp) for lighting and power throughout the terminal.

It has rows of transformers, which replaced all but the two remaining rotary converters, which remain as a historical record. M42 also included a system to monitor trains in and around the terminal, which was used from 1913 until 1922, when it was supplemented by telegraphs.

The room has a 30-ton overhead crane built by the Whiting Corporation of Illinois. The double girder crane was used to install the original equipment in 1929 and replacement pieces from World War II through to the 1990s.

== History ==
=== Earlier substations and early use of the space ===
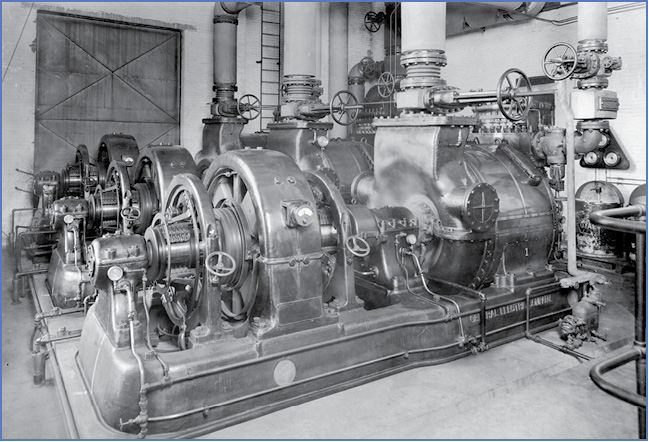
Curtis steam turbine electric generators at the 50th Street plant, c. 1913

Grand Central Terminal and its predecessors contained their own power plants. The first such plant, built for Grand Central Depot in the 1870s, stood in the surface-level railroad yards at Madison Avenue and 46th Street. The second was built in 1900 under the west side of Grand Central Station near 43rd Street.

When Grand Central Terminal was constructed, a new power and heating plant was built with it, located on the east side of Park Avenue between 49th and 50th streets, atop part of the terminal rail yard. The two-smokestack 50th Street Plant could supply a daily average of 5 million pounds (2,300,000 kg) of heating steam. The plant also provided electricity to the tracks and the station, supplementing other New York Central power plants in Yonkers (later renamed the Glenwood Power Station) and Port Morris in the Bronx (since demolished). While the Port Morris and Yonkers plants provided 11,000-volt alternating current for arriving and departing locomotives, the Grand Central plant converted the alternating current to 800 volts of direct current for use by the terminal's own third-rail-powered locomotives. In addition, the Grand Central power plant provided steam and hot water to nearby buildings. The surrounding buildings had no basement space for boiler rooms, as they stood above Grand Central's rail yard.

By 1918, the plant had reached its capacity, and so a second steam plant was constructed, in the current-day M42 basement, but only consisting of a boiler room, and utilizing the Commodore Hotel's smokestack on its northwest corner. At the time, the plant consisted of four floors, all underground. The main floor had a set of boilers, with a basement for handling the boiler's ashes, a steam meter room above the main floor, and coal bunkers above that floor. M42 also contained an electric device that printed out ticker tape whenever a train stalled, noting the location of the stalled trains. This device, manufactured by Westinghouse Electric Corporation in 1913, was obsolete by 1922.

The power plant was torn down in 1929, to be replaced by a new building for the Waldorf Astoria New York hotel. It had reached its capacity a decade earlier, and was seen as an eyesore along Park Avenue. The land was valuable, and the New York Central opted to purchase steam from the New York Steam Corporation rather than continue producing it. The decision eliminated the need for the steam plant in the M42 basement, allowing it to become a new electrical substation. The Waldorf Astoria building opened on the 50th Street Plant's site in 1931. The only remaining vestige of the plant is the storage yard under the hotel.

=== Current electrical substation ===
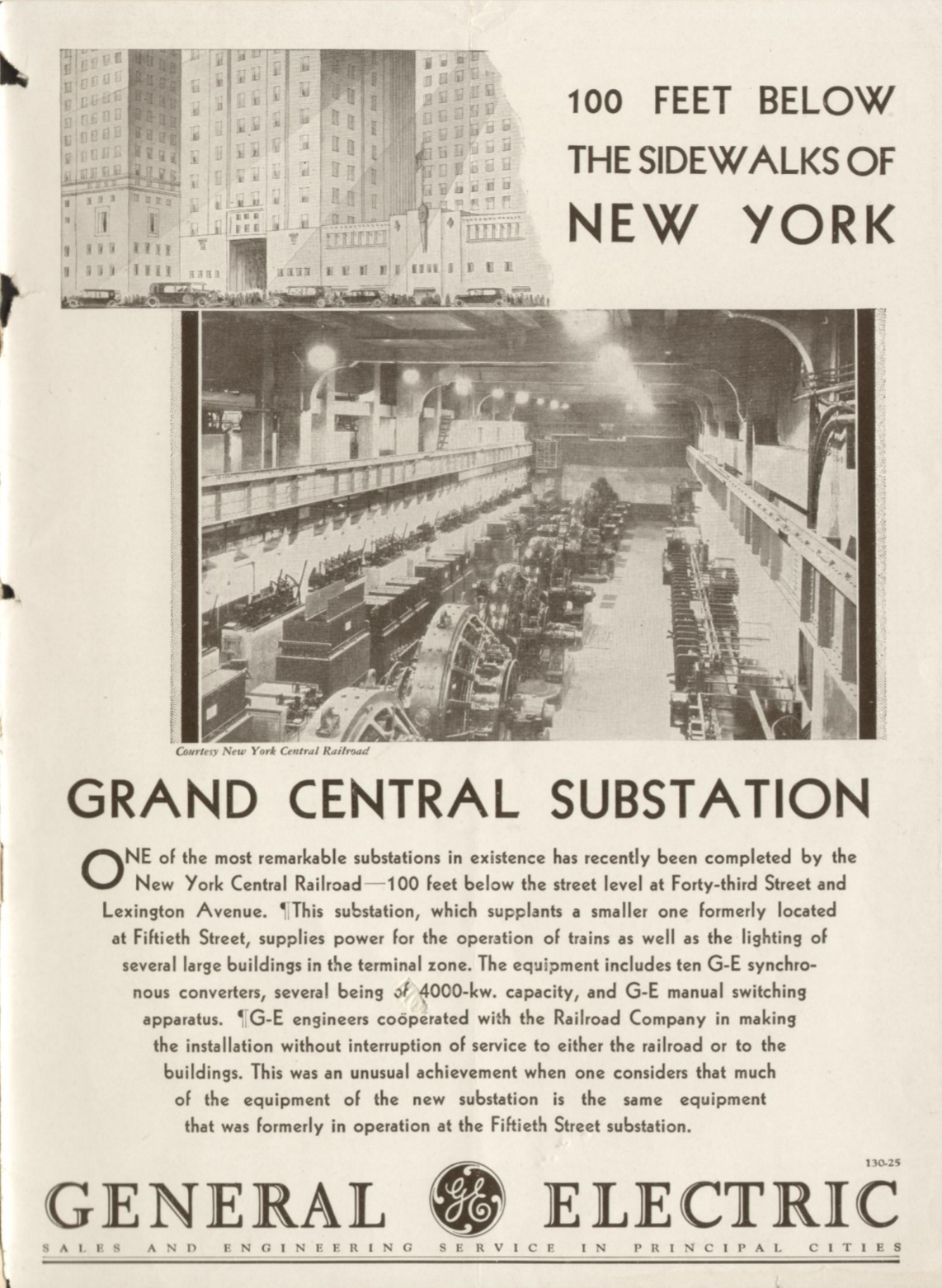
1930 advertisement featuring the substation

The current facility was built in 1918 as a secondary steam plant, but was converted into a power plant in 1929. The equipment from the old plant was still usable, so the New York Central devised a plan to move 850 tons of machinery from the 50th Street Plant into the new 43rd Street location. A new circuit breaker house was built at 49th Street to ensure a seamless move, allowing train service to continue while power equipment was moved. The most practical option for the move was to lower the equipment into rail cars in the yard below the 50th Street Plant and transport it to the terminal, where it would be again lowered 50 feet down through a hatchway into the new space.

During the renovation process, additional space was carved out beneath the Graybar Building, housing heaters and pumps to heat water and circulate it to the terminal and nearby buildings. The entire moving process began in March 1929 and was completed by Christmas of that year. It was directed by F.B. Freeman, the railroad's chief engineer. The work was contracted out, with assistance from General Electric engineers. The substation opened on February 16, 1930.

According to author Sam Roberts, the facility was featured in a navy training film as the safest place in New York during a nuclear strike. Roberts also notes that the space was removed from the building's floorplans, and contains a red button that can shut down the railroad.

The facility is often reported as a target of sabotage during World War II. Operation Pastorius, a plan by Nazi Germany to disrupt rail lines and destroy manufacturing sites and infrastructure, was staged and foiled in 1942. There is no direct evidence that M42 was a target, though the saboteurs did meet at the station's information booth and newsreel theater, and M42's entrances were patrolled by armed guards during this time.

The room originally had ten rotary converters – five for each of the substations. Seven of these were from 50th Street, one was fairly new when installed, and two were newly constructed.
