= Enos M. Barton =

American electrical engineer

Enos Melancthon Barton
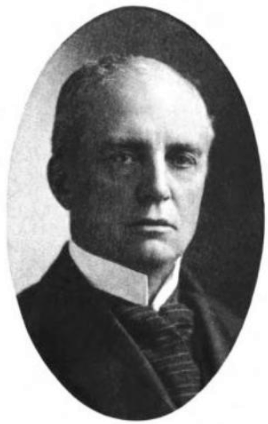
- Born: December 2, 1842; Lorraine, New York
- Died: May 3, 1916 (aged 73); Biloxi, Mississippi
- Burial place: Rosehill Cemetery
- Occupation: Electrical engineer
- Spouses: Katherine S. Richardson (m. 1869; died 1898) Mary C. Rust (m. 1899)
- Children: 6

Enos Melancthon Barton (December 2, 1842 – May 3, 1916) was an American electrical engineer who, with Elisha Gray, co-founded Western Electric Manufacturing Company.

== Biography ==
Born in Lorraine, New York in 1842, Enos M. Barton attended the University of Rochester. During the U.S. Civil War and prior to 1869, Barton was a telegraph operator.

In 1869, Barton became partners with George Shawk in an electrical engineering business in Cleveland, Ohio. Later that same year, Shawk sold his share to inventor Elisha Gray and the company was renamed the Gray and Barton Co. Barton became the secretary of the company.

In 1872, Gray and Barton moved the business to Chicago, Illinois, and manufactured typewriter parts, fire alarms, electric light fixtures, telegraph equipment, and related electrical devices. One of their best customers was the giant Western Union Telegraph Company.

In 1881, after Western Union became a partner in the Gray and Barton Co, the latter was reorganized as the Western Electric Manufacturing Company that was later licensed under the Bell telephone patents to manufacture telephone equipment for AT&T.

In 1887 Barton became president of Western Electric and oversaw the international expansion of the company from its beginning. He retired in 1908.

In 1926 Graybar Electric Company was spun off from Western Electric to handle distribution of Western Electric products. This new company was named Graybar in memory of Elisha Gray and Enos Barton.

== Personal life ==
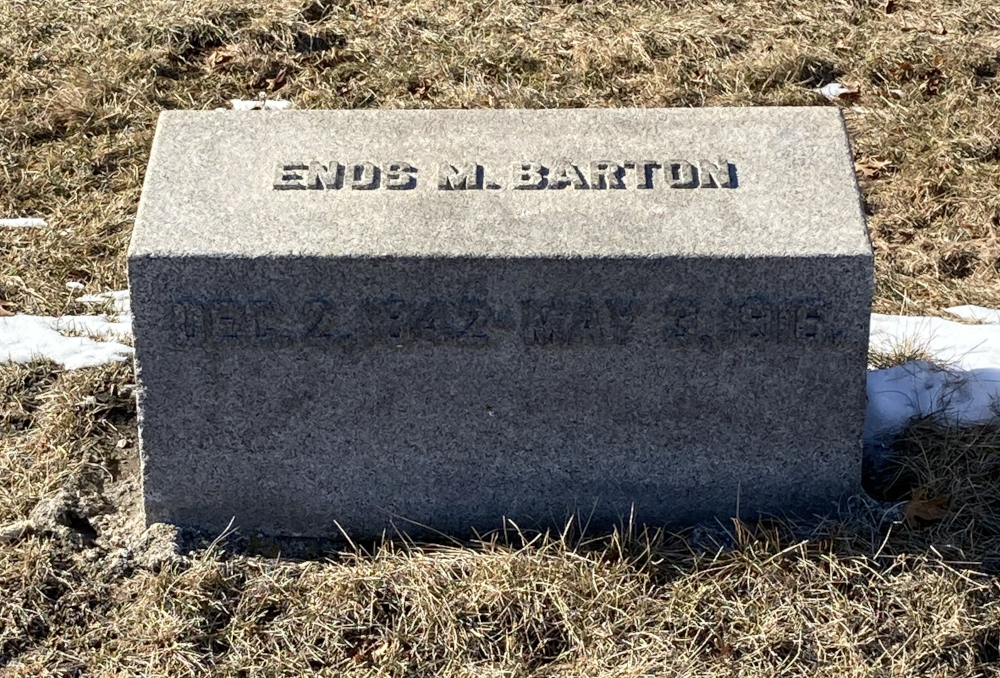
Barton's grave at Rosehill Cemetery

Barton married Katherine S. Richardson in 1869, and they had three children. She died in 1898. He remarried to Mary C. Rust on October 6, 1899, and they had three children.

He died in 1916 on his family farm in Biloxi, Mississippi. He was buried at Rosehill Cemetery in Chicago.

== See also ==
- Alexander Graham Bell
- Elisha Gray and Alexander Bell telephone controversy
