= One80 Intermediaries =

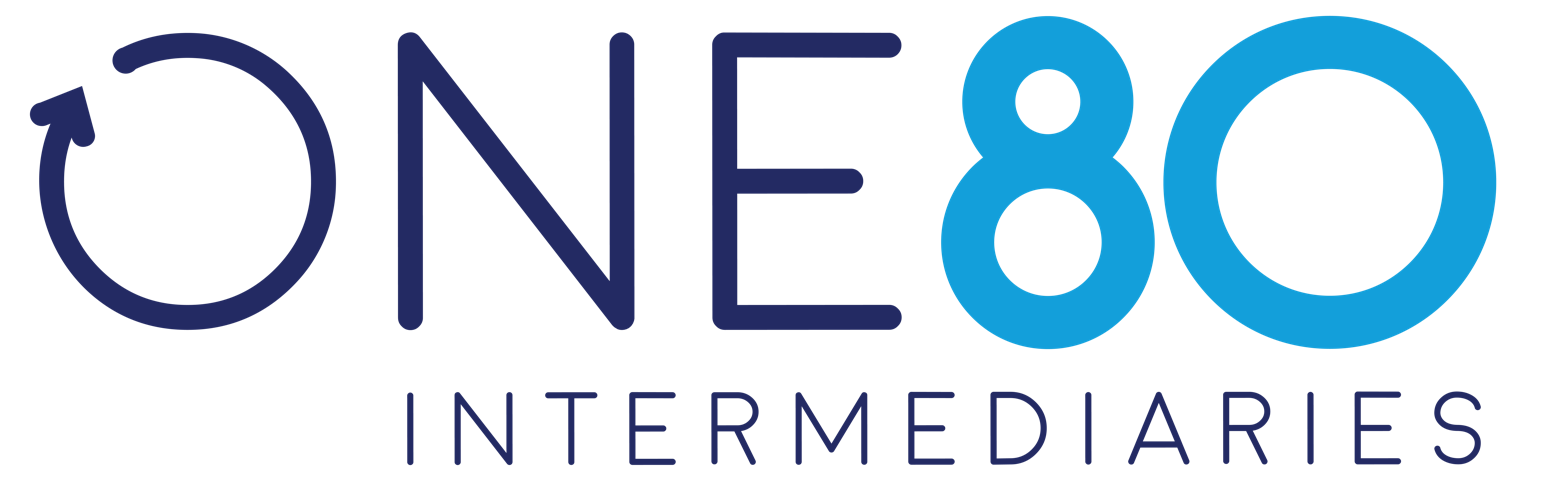

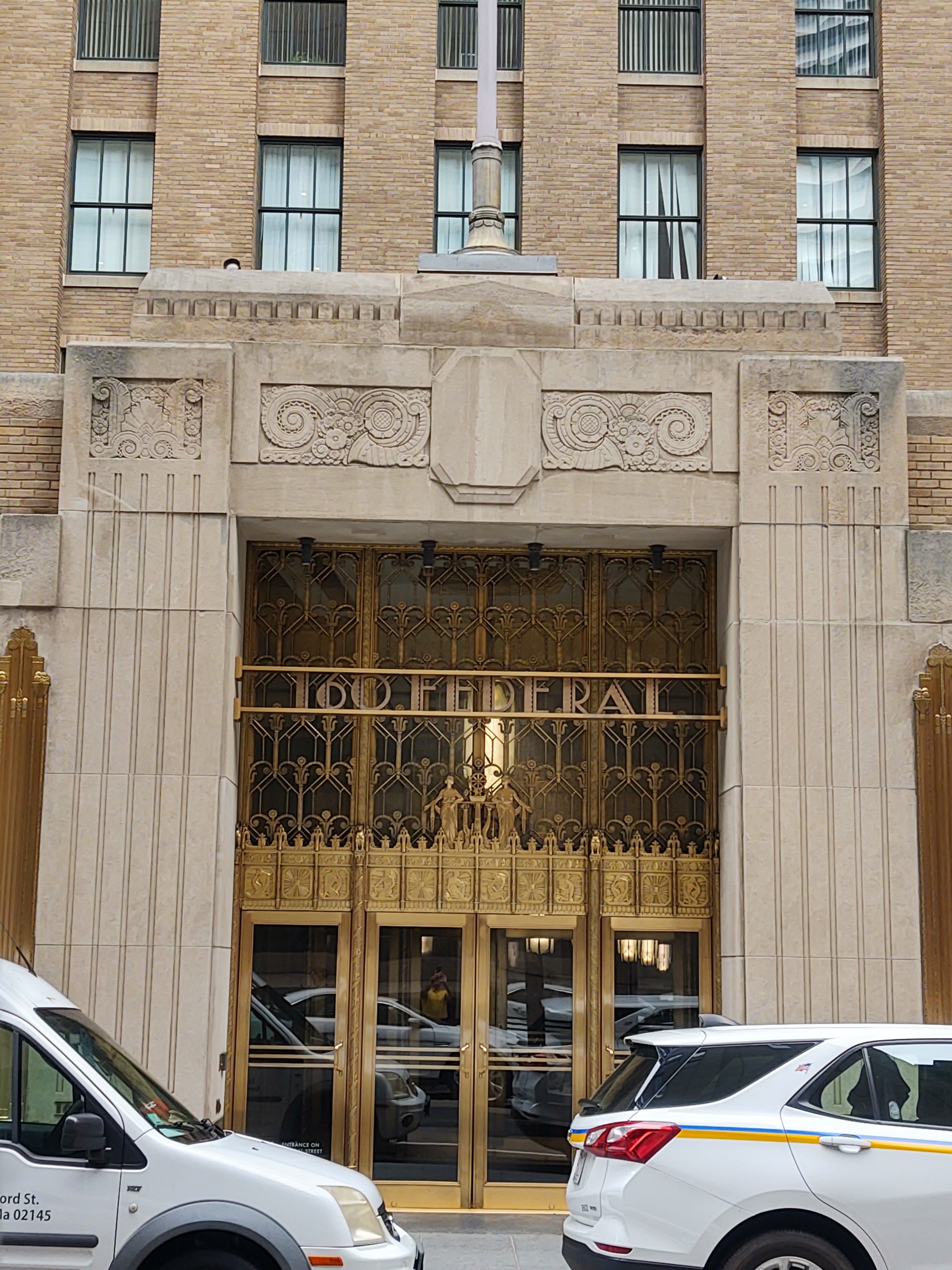
- One80 headquarters at 160 Federal Street, Boston
- Type: Private company
- Industry: Insurance
- Founded: 2019; 7 years ago Boston, Massachusetts, US
- Headquarters: Boston, Massachusetts, United States
- Area served: International
- Key people: Matthew F. Power, President; Ed Lopes, Chief Operating Officer (COO)
- Services: insurance intermediary
- Revenue: ▲US$450 million (2023)
- Number of employees: ▲1,797 (2023)
- Website: www.one80intermediaries.com

One80 Intermediaries is a specialty insurance brokerage firm with offices in the US and Canada. The firm was founded in 2019 in Boston, Massachusetts.

The firm offers access to major insurance markets in USA, United Kingdom, Asia, and Canada, as well as in-house binding authority for property & casualty, financial lines, personal lines, life insurance, benefits, medical stop loss risks, travel/accident and health, affinity, and warranty coverage.

As of 2023, it was ranked as the 5th largest MGA/underwriting manager/Lloyd's coverholder. As of July 2023, One80 Intermediaries has acquired approximately 48 companies, and has an annual revenue of approximately $450 million. One80 has approximately 130 Carrier Relationships in the US, UK, Canada, and Asia. To compliment this, One80 has 105 In-house Underwriting Programs.

One80 Intermediaries has offices in approximately 55 locations including Boston, New York City, Chicago, Cleveland, Cincinnati, Miami, Atlanta, Houston, Dallas, San Antonio, Omaha, Mountain View, Philadelphia, San Diego, and Seattle; as well as offices in Toronto, Montreal, and Lachine, QC.

== History ==
One80 Intermediaries, backed by private equity partners Kelso & Company and Goldman Sachs, was founded in 2019, and formally launched on January 7, 2020 As of the second quarter of 2023, the firm had acquired 48 niche insurance platforms across the United States and Canada. and has extended its offerings to include wholesale brokerage, national programs, contract binding, affinity and administrative services and specialty insurance.

=== Acquisitions ===
Major acquisitions include:

- Select Insurance Markets
- Maritime Program Group
- International Excess Program Managers
- Strategic Underwriting Managers, Inc.
- Safeware, Inc.
- Cannasure Insurance Services
- Pearl Insurance
- Professional Risk Solutions
- SelmanCo
- C & M First Services, Inc.
- Manchester Specialty Programs

== Services ==
Services of One80 Intermediaries include:

- National Wholesale Brokerage
- National Program Business
- Contract Binding
- Affinity and Administrative Services
- Specialty Insurance

The One80 Intermediaries platform consists of five key pillars: of National Wholesale Brokerage, Program Business, Contract Binding, Affinity and Administrative services and Specialty Insurance. These business verticals serve private and public sector businesses, non-profits, individual insureds and affinity businesses.

== Rankings ==
- 8th Largest Specialty Intermediary (Business Insurance, 2022).
- 5th Largest MGA/Underwriting Manager/Lloyd's Coverholder (Business Insurance, 2022)
- 5th Largest Underwriting Manager (Business Insurance, 2022)
