= DeWitt Stern Group =

Privately held, New York City-based insurance brokerage and risk advisory firm

DeWitt Stern Group, Inc.
- Company type: Private company
- Industry: Insurance broking; insurance, risk management, financial and human resource consulting
- Founded: 1899
- Defunct: 2014
- Fate: Merged
- Successor: Risk Strategies
- Headquarters: New York City, United States
- Key people: Jolyon Stern, (President & CEO)
- Products: Insurance, risk management, employee benefits
- Number of employees: 180 (2008)
- Website: www.dewittstern.com

The DeWitt Stern Group was a privately held, New York City-based insurance brokerage and risk advisory firm. National in scope, the firm also has offices in North White Plains NY, Jersey City NJ, Chicago IL, and in two California locations: San Francisco and Glendale. It operated from 1899 until it was acquired in 2014 by Risk Strategies.

== History ==
Founded in 1899 by DeWitt H. Stern, the firm is led by the founder's grandson, Jolyon F. Stern, who represents the third generation of family ownership.

In 2014, DeWitt Stern Group was acquired by Risk Strategies.
