= Galerie Chalette =

Private contemporary art gallery in Manhattan, New York, U.S.

- "La Chalette"
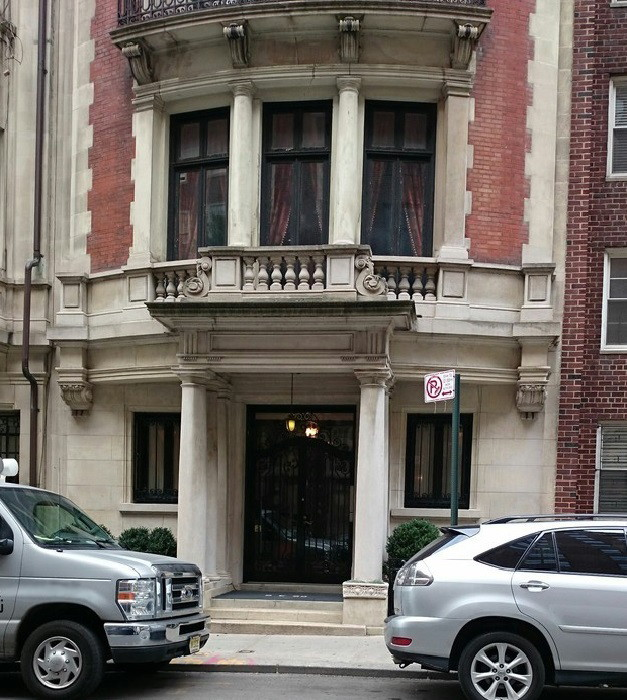
- Galerie Chalette at 9 88th St., New York
- Interactive map of Galerie Chalette
- Location: 45 West 57th Street, New York, United States 1100 Madison Avenue, New York, USA 9 East 88th Street, New York, USA
- Coordinates: 40.782691°N 73.958544°W
- Owner: Arthur Lejwa, Madeleine Chalette Lejwa
- Type: Art gallery
- Events: Geometric Abstraction, Modernism, Constructivists, Suprematists

Construction
- Opened: 1954
- Closed: 1978

Galerie Chalette was a private contemporary art gallery in Manhattan, New York, USA. It was founded by the married art dealers and collectors Madeleine Chalette Lejwa (1915–1996) and Arthur Lejwa (1895–1972) in February 1954. The Lejwas were refugees from the Nazi invasions of Poland and France. Initially, their gallery specialized in contemporary French and Polish prints and painting. Later they changed its focus to contemporary 20th century American and European Sculpture, and especially the work of Jean Arp.

"La Chalette" was best known for organizing group exhibitions which were then offered to various museums around the United States, including Construction and Geometry in Painting (1960), and Structured Sculpture (1960, 1968), as well as their major Arp exhibition, Jean Arp : from the collections of Mme. Marguerite Arp and Arthur and Madeleine Lejwa, at the Metropolitan Museum of Art, in 1972.

The gallery closed in 1978.

== History ==
=== Foundation ===
Madeleine Chalette was born in 1915 in Paris, France, and moved with her family to Poland as a child. In 1940, following her successful effort to secure the release of her father, Leon Chalette, from Sachsenhausen, a German concentration camp near Berlin, father and daughter traveled by boat to Shanghai, where they lived during World War II, arriving in the United States in 1946. Arthur Lejwa, a Polish-born biochemist, immigrated to the United States in 1939 and taught at Long Island University. He served as a representative of the Polish Government in Exile during World War II. His intentions of returning to Poland after the war were crushed when he received word that his entire family had perished in the Nazi gas chambers. He met Chalette soon after her arrival in the United States and they married in 1947.

=== 45 West 57th Street ===
The gallery's early exhibitions in the 1950s were largely thematic. Chalette's pre-war connections and works by Marc Chagall, Pablo Picasso, and Georges Braque from the Chalette family collection helped establish the gallery as viable and set the tone for the gallery's future. The Lejwas prided themselves on their close friendships with the artists they represented. During the first four years of their gallery, they presented new works by Jean Arp, Chagall, Wassily Kandinsky, Kazimir Malevich, Henri Matisse, and Picasso. Picasso's sketch of Madeleine Lejwa from this period is now in the collection of the Israel Museum. The Lejwas also had an interest in African art. In 1956, they arranged for North African artisans to produce limited edition carpet designs by Picasso, Alexander Calder, Joan Miró, Jean Lurçat as well as several pieces by Fernand Léger.

=== 1100 Madison Avenue ===
In 1957, the gallery expanded into new space on Madison Avenue. During this period the Lejwas liaised with Josef Albers, then head of the Yale Department of Design in New Haven. Albers, another European war refugee, worked with the Lejwas. In 1960, they mounted the group exhibit, Construction and Geometry in Painting, from Malevich to “tomorrow”, which included works by Albers, Arp, Max Bill, Sonia Delaunay, César Domela, Victor Vasarely, and others. This exhibition subsequently travelled to Cincinnati, Chicago, Minneapolis, and San Francisco.

At the time, abstract expressionist painting had become mainstream gallery fare. This exhibition presented geometric abstract painting up to the present day, which was at that time a new aesthetic for the American audience, serious and silent (according to the bilingual catalogue text by Michel Seuphor) rather than attention provoking. Championing the geometric abstract aesthetic would become the work for which Galerie Chalette would become best known.

A second exhibition formed through the Albers connection was the Structured Sculpture show in the same year, which included works by Norman Carlberg, Kent Bloomer, Erwin Hauer, Stephanie Scuris, and Robert Engman, Deborah De Moulpied, all of whom were working at or for Yale (and Albers) at this time.

Gallerie Chalette continued to present Geometric and Constructivist ideas in solo exhibits from Burgoyne Diller (1961) and in a series of shows from Leon Polk Smith, including his Constellations exhibition of 1968.

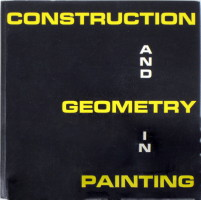
Construction and Geometry in Painting (1958) This clean, sans-serif font was used on all catalogue not using artist signatures

=== 88th Street ===
Galerie Chalette's final move to 9 East 88th Street, New York, was into the ground floor entry hall of a historical five-story brownstone building close to the Solomon R. Guggenheim Museum and two blocks away from the Metropolitan Museum of Art, the two museums with whom they arranged their last major exhibitions, Fangor, at the Guggenheim in 1970, and Arp with the Met in 1972.

== Aesthetic ==
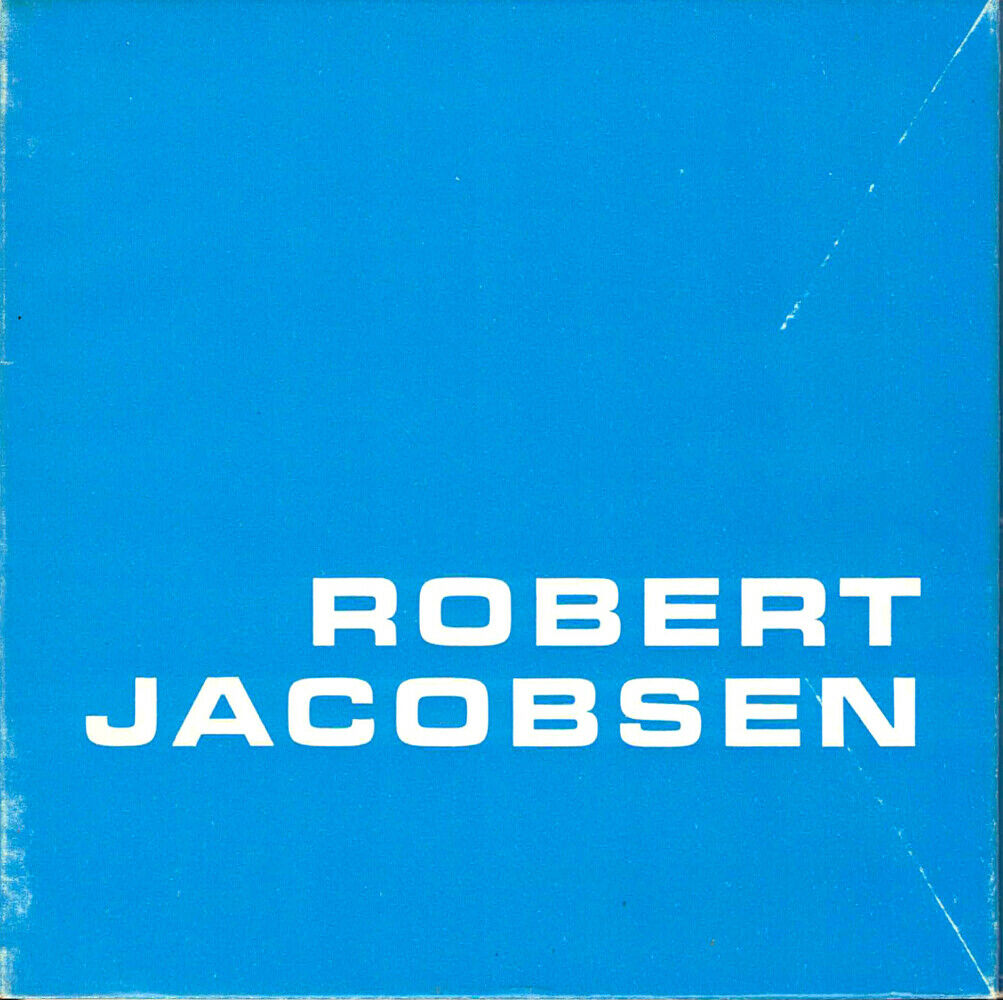
Robert Jacobsen (1966) Exemplar of the maximally spare cover, still with distinctive La Chalette design.

"The Galerie Chalette’s distinctive quality was that it represented one stylistic direction, namely geometric abstraction." "Theirs was a story of continuous work on behalf of this style of artist, carried out with great commitment and capital investment. They were collectors and gallerists, and these aspects were indissolubly bound together."

The Lejwas published catalogues alongside each of their exhibitions, including color plates where possible and commentary by notable critics. This practice reflected the Lejwas' loyalty to their artists and desire to see their artists' reputations and art established and available beyond the gallery's walls. From a business perspective, this attention to the "secondary" art market (the resale of art following its original acquisition from the artist), contributed to La Chalette's increased stature as a gallery throughout the 1960s.

The gallery developed a spare yet specific and easily identifiable style for its catalogues, which ranged from relatively simple productions to elaborately printed, numbered, limited editions.

== Representation ==
=== Artists ===
Artists represented by the Galerie Chalette included:

- Albers, Josef, (1960)
- Arp, Jean
- Bill, Max
- Carlberg, Norman
- Derain, André, (1957)
- Diller, Burgoyne, (1964)
- Engman, Robert
- Fangor, Wojciech
- Fuller, Sue
- González, Roberta
- González, Julio, (1961)
- Hepworth, Barbara
- Moholy-Nagy, László
- Picasso, Pablo
- Reimann, William
- Rickey, George
- Scuris, Stephanie
- Smith, Leon Polk
- Vasarely, Victor
- Weber, Max

=== Selected exhibitions ===
- Hepworth, (1959), Barbara Hepworth
- Construction and Geometry in Painting, (31 March – 4 June 1960) Traveling Schedule: Cincinnati Art Museum, Cincinnati (July–October), Arts Club of Chicago, Chicago (November–December), Walker Art Center, Minneapolis (January–February)
- Structured Sculpture, (1961)
- Structured Sculpture, (1968)
- Torn Drawings, (1965), Leon Polk Smith
- Fangor, (1970) in collaboration with the Guggenheim
- Jean Arp : from the collections of Mme. Marguerite Arp and Arthur and Madeleine Lejwa, (1972) in collaboration with the Met

Galerie Chalette: exhibitions & associated catalogues
Date		Artist	Exhibition Title	Catalogue
Year	Dates	Artist	Exhibition Title	Catalogue
1953	19 Nov - 10 Dec	Henri Matisse	Lithographs Linoleum Cuts Aquatints 1925-1953	Softcover Catalogue
1955	19 Nov - 10 Dec	Rolf Gerard	Recent Paintings	Preface: Roland Dorgelès
1956		Pablo Picasso	Picasso - The Woman (Paintings, Drawings, Bronzes & Lithographs)	Preface: Eugene Victor Thaw
1956	Nov 13 - Dec 08	Marc Chagall	Recent Paintings	Catalogue
1957	14 Feb - Mar 9	Michel Cadoret	Paintings	Essays: Armand Hoog, Jacques Maritain
1957	12 Nov - 14 Dec	Wassily Kandinsky	Kandinsky	Catalogue
1958		Pablo Picasso et al	Sculpture by Painters	
1958	March - April	Marc Chagall	Chagall: A Selection of Paintings from American Museums and Private Collections	Preface: Raissa Maritain
1958	07 Oct - 02 Nov	Manuel "Manolo" Martinez Hugué	Manolo	Preface: Daniel-Henry Kahnweiler
1959	12 Nov - 14 Dec	Henri Laurens	Laurens: Collages, Gouaches, Drawings, Water Colors, Sculpture	Catalogue
1959	Oct	Barbara Hepworth	Hepworth	Preface: Sir Herbert Read
1959	Nov – Dec	Jankel Adler	Recent Artwork	Preface: Alfred Werner
1960	31 Mar – 4 Jun	Josef Albers, Jean Arp, Max Bill, Sonia Delaunay, César Domela, Victor Vasarely	Construction and Geometry in Painting: From Malevitch to Tomorrow	Preface: Michel Seuphor
1960	Oct – Nov	Jean Arp and Sophie Taeuber-Arp	The Spiritual Mission of Art	Preface: Michel Seuphor
1960	Dec	Norman Carlberg, Kent Bloomer, William Reimann, Erwin Hauer, Stephanie Scuris, Robert Engman, Deborah De Moulpied	Structured Sculpture	Catalogue
1961		Burgoyne Diller	Diller: Paintings Constructions Drawings Watercolors	Catalogue (Green Cover)
1961	Oct – Nov	Julio González	Recent Work	Preface: Hilton Kramer
1962		Nicolas de Staël		Catalogue
1962		Jan Lebenstein		Preface: Jean Cassou
1962		Gustave Singier	Gustave Singier	Preface: Roger van Gindertael
1963	12 Nov - 14 Dec	Kurt Schwitters	Kurt Schwitters	Essays: Hans Richter, Jean Arp; hard & soft cover catalogues
1963	Mar – Apr	Pierre Caille	Works	Catalogue
1965	Jan	Jean Arp		
1965	Apr	Fernand Léger	The Figure	Text & Quotes: artist
1965	Oct	Leon Polk Smith	Torn Drawings	Portfolio
1966		Robert Jacobsen	Paintings	Preface: Michel Ragon
1968	12 Nov - 14 Dec	Leon Polk Smith	'Constellations	Catalogue
1968	Oct – Nov	John Cunningham, Robert Engman, Erwin Hauer, Deborah de Moulpied, William Reimann, Stephanie Scuris, Robert Zeidman	Structured Sculpture	Catalogue
1969	Jan – Feb	Wojciech Fangor	Recent paintings by Fangor	Catalogue
1975	n.a	Jean Arp	Sculpture, Reliefs, Works on Paper	Catalogue (Chalette International)

== Legacy ==
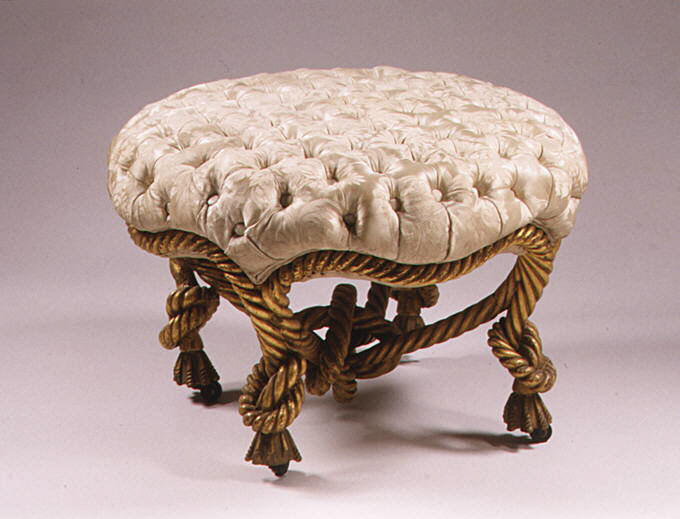
French 19th-century stool, a gift from Arthur and Madeleine Lejwa Collection to the Metropolitan Museum of Art in 1985

Arthur Lejwa died in New York in October 1972 and was buried in Jerusalem. Madeleine Lejwa reconfigured the gallery business as Chalette International and continued on as a dealer and consultant, reducing the exhibition aspects of the gallery's work. Madeleine Lejwa made donations to major museums in the United States, including Arp's Oriforme to the National Gallery of Art in 1978.

On Madeleine Lejwa's death in 1991, the Galerie Chalette papers were formally lodged at the Smithsonian Archives of American Art and the bulk of the Lejwa Collection went to the Israel Museum in Jerusalem, which, in 2004, produced a complete catalogue of the Arthur and Madeleine Lejwa Collection, featuring Picasso's image of Madeleine Lejwa on the cover. There were no family survivors of either the Chalette or Lejwa family.

== Bibliography ==
- Apter-Gabriel, Ruth (2005). The Arthur and Madeleine Chalette Lejwa Collection in the Israel Museum. Jerusalem: The Israel Museum.
- Jean Arp: from the collections of Mme. Marguerite Arp and Arthur and Madeleine Lejwa, at the Metropolitan Museum of Art. New York: The Metropolitan Museum of Art. 1972.
