= Leon Polk Smith =

American painter

- Born: Leon Polk Smith; May 20, 1906; Chickasha, Territory of Oklahoma
- Died: December 4, 1996 (aged 90); New York, New York movement = De Stijl, Hard-edge School, Minimalism
- Education: Pocasset High School; East Central University, BA; Columbia University Teacher's College, MA
- Known for: Painting
- Notable work: Stonewall, (1956)
- Partner: Robert Mead Jamieson (from ~1951)

Leon Polk Smith (1906–1996) was an American painter. His geometrically oriented abstract paintings were influenced by Piet Mondrian and he is a follower of the hard-edge school. His best-known paintings constitute maximally reduced forms, characterized by just two colors on a canvas meeting in a sharply delineated edge, often on an unframed canvas of unusual shape. His work is represented in many museums in the United States, Europe, and South America. Thanks to a generous bequest from the artist, the Brooklyn Museum owns a number of his works.

== Early life ==
Smith was born near Chickasha, a year before Oklahoma became a state. His parents, William and Samantha Smith, had arrived in present-day Oklahoma from Tennessee at the end of the 19th century, and had settled on land with the Chickasaw Nation and Choctaw Nation in Indian Territory. Smith was the eighth of nine children and labored on his parents' modest homestead throughout an impecunious childhood. After high school, he worked as a ranch-hand in Oklahoma, then built roads and constructed telephone systems in Arizona. During this period Smith sent money home to help his parents with the mortgage on their land, but even the aggregate of the family's funds proved insufficient to avoid foreclosure.

After the foreclosure, and released from the burden of familial financial support, Smith enrolled at Oklahoma State College (now East Central University), in Ada, Oklahoma, with the intention of becoming a teacher. Following graduation, he moved to New York City (1936), where he attended the Columbia University Teacher's College. Smith's artistic development was set in motion during his first semester at Columbia, when one of his teachers took him to see the Gallatin Collection, then at New York University. The sight of paintings by Mondrian and sculpture by Constantin Brâncuși and Jean Arp was a formative experience.

== Career ==
=== Art ===
Smith had his first show in New York City at the Uptown Gallery in 1941. In the decade that followed, Smith moved through preliminary explorations of neo-plasticism and began to paint in a more hard-edge style, typified by geometric lines, curving shapes of color, and the use of tondo (disk-shaped) canvases. A review for a 1956 solo show at the Camino Gallery noted Smith as a Geometric painter, who had "extended De Stijl principles to include tonal variations and nonrectilinear elements." Smith acknowledged his debt to the De Stijl movement and to Mondrian, but stated that he was looking in his work to take the road beyond: "people said [Mondrian] had hit a dead end, or a stone wall and I said I don't think so."

As late as 1962, he continued to receive notifications for derivative influence: the "flawlessly executed" bas-reliefs of his exhibition for Eleanor Ward at the Stable Gallery were typified as "Arpish."

But with the support of prominent gallerists in the late 1950s, by the mid-60s Smith had found an audience for his work as an independent voice. His artwork was included in two important group exhibitions, The Responsive Eye at the Museum of Modern Art (1965) and Systemic Painting at the Solomon R. Guggenheim Museum (1966). His two important series of the period, Correspondences and Constellations impressed reviewers with their interplay of form, color, and space.

He introduced his Constellation series at the Galerie Chalette in 1969.

In 1995, the Brooklyn Museum curated Leon Polk Smith: American Painter, a retrospective exhibition of Smith's career.

He was affiliated with numerous prominent dealers, including Sidney Janis, Charles Egan, Betty Parsons, Galerie Chalette, and Denise René.

=== Teaching ===
From 1939 to 1948, Smith supported himself via teaching and teaching administration. He was State Supervisor of Art Education in Delaware, Assistant Professor of Art at the TC University System of Georgia, and accepted university teaching positions at Rollins College in Florida, New York University, and Mills College of Education in New York.

== Legacy ==
Smith died in Manhattan in 1996, with an acknowledged position in the development of American geometric abstraction. He had arrived at geometry before others and remained steadfastly loyal to its principles, cultivating aspects of scale and simplicity that presaged the Hard-Edge and Minimal painting styles of the late 1950s and '60s. Younger painters like Ellsworth Kelly, Jack Youngerman and Al Held visited his studio and came away inspired. But he cultivated a maverick attitude as a New York outsider that resisted definition as part of any single contemporary movement on the arts scene. This challenged his reviewers, as they looked for soundbites to describe his status and his work. When asked for his inspirations at a post-commencement speech roundtable, Smith cited the two professors of English who opened his mind to the beauty of Middle-English and Poetry, rather than name-dropping his contemporaries or artistic mentors.

The Leon Polk Smith Foundation was established by the artist before his death to "preserve and promote the art and legacy of Leon Polk Smith."

== Exhibitions ==
=== Group ===
- The Responsive Eye at the Museum of Modern Art (1965)
- Systemic Painting at the Solomon R. Guggenheim Museum (1966)

=== Solo ===
- Paintings & Sculpture, the Stable Gallery (1962)
- Torn Drawings, Galerie Chalette (1965)
- Constellations, Galerie Chalette, (1969)
- Leon Polk Smith: Retrospective, Galerie Denise Rene, (1975)
- Recent Work, Washburn Galleries, Uptown & Downtown (1981)
- Leon Polk Smith: American Painter, the Brooklyn Museum (1995)
- Leon Polk Smith: The Constellation Paintings, Louis Stern Fine Arts (2007)
- Linear Curves: Leon Polk Smith - Works from the 1960s, Louis Stern Fine Arts (2011)

=== Posthumous ===
- Leon Polk Smith, Joan T. Washburn Gallery (2005)
- Leon Polk Smith: Hiding in Plain Sight, Heard Museum (2021)
- Leon Polk Smith: Big Form, Big Space, Contemporary Art Gallery (Vancouver) (2021)

== Quotations ==
"It is very important that the dealer understands the artist's work and [has the] ability to talk about it intelligently. I have heard dealers say: 'I know what I like and I think that is enough.' Enough for a cow but not a dealer."
