= Stephanie Scuris =

American artist (born 1931)

- Born: Stephanie Scuris; 1931; Lacedaemonos, Greece
- Education: Yale University, BFA, MFA
- Known for: Sculpture
- Notable work: Harmony Fountain, Singapore
- Movement: Bauhaus, Modernist, Constructivist, Geometric abstraction

Stephanie Scuris (born 1931) is a Greek-American artist and arts educator known for her large-scale Constructivist sculptures. She taught at the Rinehart School of Sculpture at the Maryland Institute College of Art in Baltimore, Maryland.

== Early life ==
Scuris was born in Lacedaemonos, Greece,. She moved to the United States in 1947 at age 16, two years after the end of World War II. She studied under Josef Albers at Yale University, receiving a BFA and a MFA from the School of Art and Architecture in the late 1950s.

== Career ==
Scuris was one of the select group of students Albers introduced to Madeleine and Arthur Lejwa at the Galerie Chalette. While still a student at Yale, she exhibited at their Structured Sculptures show of winter 1960. She exhibited at the Whitney Museum of Art, MOMA, The Baltimore Museum of Art, and the Yale Art School, and worked on major commissions for the Bankers Trust Company and the Salk Laboratories in the 1960s.

In 1962 she was part of a major exhibition at Mt. Holyoke College, in conjunction with the school's 125th anniversary, celebrating the "coming of age" on women's art, in America, as a creative force. Other exhibitors included Lee Bontecou, Helen Frankenthaler, Louise Nevelson, Georgia O-Keefe, and numerous others.

She was recruited, along with Norman Carlberg, by the educator and artist Eugene Leake (both alumni of the Yale/Albers MFA program), to revive the sculpture program at the Rinehart School at the Maryland Institute of Art. That revival was, by Scuris's account, "all about Bauhaus,” an educational approach that centered on knowledge of the physical manipulation of materials rather than strict figurative representation.

== Later years ==
Scuris spent her latter years in a combined studio-apartment in a former warehouse in the historic neighborhood of Fells Point, in Baltimore, Maryland, in the company of her brother, Theodore Scuris, also an artist. When asked by a local interviewer why she had never married, she answered, ‘I had my art, I couldn’t do both.’

== Selected exhibitions ==
- New Haven Art Festival, 1958–59
- Art: USA, traveling exhibition, in 1958 through 1960
- Recent Sculpture USA, Museum of Modern Art, New York, 1959
- Structured Sculpture, Galerie Chalette, New York, 1961 & 1968
- Geometric Abstraction in America, Whitney Museum of American Art, 1962
- Women Artists in America Today, Mt. Holyoke College, MA, 1962
- White on White, DeCordova Museum, Lincoln, MA, 1965
- Inside Outside, Smith College Museum of Art, Northampton, MA, 1966
- Josef Albers: His Art & Influence, Montclair Art Museum, NJ, 1981

== Awards, permanent collections ==
- Winterwitz Award
- Yale University, prize for outstanding work & alumni award
- Peabody Award, 1961–62;
- Rinehart fellowship, 1961-64.
- Skedion Ecton, (1964) Whitney Museum of American Art, New York
