= Eugene Leake =

American painter

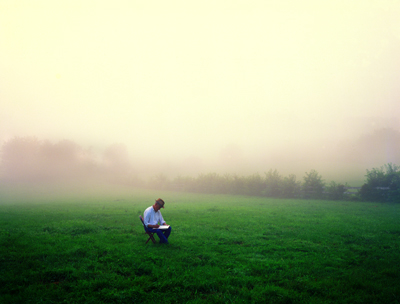
- Portrait of Eugene Leake by Bill McAllen
- Born: 31 August 1911; Jersey City, New Jersey, US
- Died: 21 January 2005 (aged 93); Monkton, Maryland, US
- Education: Yale School of Art and Architecture
- Known for: Painting, Watercolors
- Movement: Realism Romanticism En plein air

Eugene "Bud" Leake pronounced "Leaky" (31 August 1911 – 21 January 2005) was a landscape painter and president of the Maryland Institute College of Art. His work was characterized by a consistent commitment to the depiction of the landscape, not following ever-changing trends of contemporary art in the 20th century. In an October 2000 Baltimore Sun article Glenn McNatt wrote that, "For the past quarter century, Leake has been recording that landscape in all its moods and seasons, from riotous sun-drenched spring mornings to the magical glow of autumnal sunsets. His paintings are imbued with an unmistakable sense of place that only one who has lived in and loved the surrounding landscape can create."

"Leake belongs to the long tradition of American artists who have had often-rapturous love affairs with nature. His work are heirs to the spirit of the oil sketches of English master John Constable (1776-1837) and the early works of French landscape artist Camille Corot (1796-1875), both of whom insisted that painting must be based on observable facts and reflect the truth of the moment."

In a 1993 ARTnews article Tom Weisser wrote: "Leake's great strength is his ability to capture the essence of things with economy and easy grace. Light, space, and climate materialize in his pictures from what seems to be an absolute minimum of brushwork. His paint has a soft, buttery quality. Yet the viewer can almost feel the flat, hard cold of Leake's gray winter mornings, the snap of his autumn afternoons, and the electricity in his gathering summer skies."

== Early life ==
Eugene Leake was born in Jersey City, New Jersey on August 31, 1911, one of two sons of Eugene W. Leake and Marion (Paige) Leake. Growing up he was surrounded by paintings belonging to his grandfather. The collection included, American painters, Ralph Blakelock, J. Francis Murphy, and E. Irving Couse.

As a teenage student at the Hill School in Pittston, Pennsylvania Leake requested an art class so frequently that the school hired an instructor from Philadelphia to teach him once a week. Leake explains, "'Here was an artist who rode the train up from Philadelphia every Saturday morning to teach me and one other boy - two students out of 450,' says Leake, his voice still tinged with disbelief.'"

== Early career ==
In 1930 Leake briefly attended the Yale School of Fine Arts but soon dropped out having found "... its Beaux Arts orientation tedious and uninspiring." Next, he left Connecticut and traveled south.

At twenty-two, Leake traveled through the southwest and California before returning to Connecticut. Back in New England, Leake built a studio and made a living painting commissioned portraits and teaching art classes. In 1937 he joined the Art Students League in New York and began showing his paintings at galleries in the area. He had his first one-man show at the Walker Gallery in 1937 after which he was invited to participate in national group shows at the Metropolitan Museum of Art, the Art Institute of Chicago and the Brooklyn Museum.

During World War II, Leake first took a job at a defense plant, then later joined the Navy, where he continued to paint watercolors during his off hours. In 1949 Leake became the director of The Art Center in Louisville, Kentucky and held the position for a decade. During this time, in addition to teaching painting and composition, Leake taught landscape, portraiture, and life drawing. Then, at age 48, decided to finish his degree at Yale School of Art and Architecture. The artist subsequently earned his BFA in 1960 and his MFA in 1962.

When Eugene Leake attended Yale University, Josef Albers had recently retired from the chair of the School of Art but continued to be a presence on campus. Leake described an experience with the Bauhaus master: "Albers came to my studio one day. I was painting semi-abstract landscapes, horizontal bands of color. He said to me, 'I've heard about you. You are de old Prix de Rome - type painter. Mit underpainting und all dot garbage?' I said, 'Yeah, I learned all that.' And Albers looked at my painting and said, 'Vot you doing here? Dis is about color! It's a metamorphosis!'"

== Maryland Institute College of Art ==
In June 1961 Eugene Leake moved to Maryland after graduating from Yale to "take on the task of reviving the nearly moribund Maryland Institute," as its new President. "He recruited the best artists he could find as teachers, among them the painters Grace Hartigan and Raoul Middleman, sculptors Norman Carlberg and Stephanie Scuris, and painter-printmaker Peter Milton."

"Leake has found success and recognition not only as an artist but as one of the finest teachers and arts administrators of the recent past. He was for 13 years president of the Maryland Institute College of Art, an institution he almost single-handedly remade from a cobwebbed, struggling vocational training academy into one of the most respected art schools in the nation."

Despite his demanding schedule at the Maryland Institute College of Art, the painter never stopped painting and developing. In 1974 Leake retired from his role as president of the Maryland Institute College of Art

In 2013 a new residence hall was open named Leake Hall after him.

== Mid to late career ==
"When he retired from the Institute in 1974, he was 63 and [the school's] renaissance was assumed to be his life's magnum opus. But he retired to the rural Maryland countryside north of Baltimore, where he took up the solitary life of a creative artist and [continued as] a successful and respected landscape painter." He continued to work until his death in 2005.

In the autumn of 1974 Eugene Leake became the first Johns Hopkins University artist-in-residence. He "founded the program as an informal opportunity for Hopkins students, regardless of experience, to learn the fundamentals of drawing and painting -- to learn to see."

In The Baltimore Sun art critic Glenn McNatt described Leake's work and legacy: "Leake's brushstroke was like the man himself: precise, energetic, joyous, and ever attuned to the mysterious universal vibration through which paint is transformed into a living thing. Though his art looked exceedingly simple, it was also miraculous, and for this he was, and will be forever, beloved by generations of Marylanders."

== Selected solo exhibitions ==
C. Grimaldis Gallery, Baltimore, Maryland
Green Mountain Gallery, New York, New York
Hamilton Gallery, Charleston, South Carolina
Jacobs Ladder Gallery, Washington, D.C.
Johns Hopkins University, Baltimore, Maryland
Maryland Institute College of Art, Baltimore, Maryland
National Academy of Sciences, Washington, D.C.
Tatistcheff and Company, New York, New York
Towson State University, Towson, Maryland
University of Louisville, Louisville, Kentucky
University of Kentucky, Lexington, Kentucky
Walker Gallery, New York, New York
York College, York, Pennsylvania

== Selected group exhibitions ==
Art Institute of Chicago, Chicago, Illinois
Art Museum of South Texas, Corpus Christi, Texas
Baltimore Museum of Art, Baltimore, Maryland
Brooklyn Museum of Art, Brooklyn, New York
Butler Institute of American Art, Youngstown, Ohio
Cincinnati Museum of Art, Cincinnati, Ohio
Guild Hall Museum, East Hampton, New York
Hirschl and Adler Galleries, New York, New York
Jersey City Museum, Jersey City, New Jersey
M. Knoedler and Company, New York, New York
Metropolitan Museum of Art, New York, New York
Museum of Modern Art, New York, New York
Owensboro Museum of Fine Art, Owensboro, Kentucky
Betty Parsons Gallery, New York, New York
Pennsylvania Academy of Fine Arts, Philadelphia, Pennsylvania
Philadelphia Museum of Art, Philadelphia, Pennsylvania

== Selected public collections ==
Baltimore Museum of Art, Baltimore, Maryland
Corcoran Gallery of Art, Washington, D.C.
J.B. Speed Museum, Louisville, Kentucky
Owensboro Museum of Fine Art, Owensboro, Kentucky
University of Louisville, Louisville, Kentucky
University of North Carolina, Chapel Hill, North Carolina
Washington County Museum of Fine Arts, Hagerstown, Maryland

== Selected private and corporate collections ==
Equitable Bank
Equitable Life Assurance Society of America, New York
Federal Reserve Bank of Richmond, Baltimore Branch
Johns Hopkins University
Maryland Institute College of Art
Metropolitan Life Insurance Company, New York
Noxell Corporation
Piper and Marbury
Robert and Jane Meyerhoff
United States Fidelity and Guaranty Company
Weinberg and Green

== Johns Hopkins Eugene Leake Award ==
Johns Hopkins University awards the Eugene Leake Award to commemorate Leake, who had founded the Homewood Art Workshops at JHU. The award celebrates excellence of select graduating students for outstanding achievements in visual art and is presented annually by the Johns Hopkins Center for Visual Art (CVA). Recipients are chosen by faculty based on their progress, technical skill, and contributions to the artistic community at the university.

=== Past Recipients ===
Year	Recipients	Ref.	Note
2024	Daniela Rodriguez		
2023	Mason Cole; Jeanie Fung; Rena Guo; Jessica Li; Darcy Trinco		
2022	Jessie Suthicha Kanacharoen; Kyana Brubaker; Norah Wilson		
2021	Maya Fraga; Rebekah Lo; Mecca McDonald; Rebecca Penner; Ian Waggoner		
2018	Evelyn Chiu Jen Nadel Jihae Snyder Sabrina Wang		
2017	Maddy Goodwin Caroline Preziosi		*Possibly Incomplete
2016	Florence Ma Rahul Sharma Beatriz Williams Mary Yen		
2015	Sofia Arruda Alessandra Felloni Dae Jin Kim Gyudae Kim Jei Wook Moon Rachel Riegelhaupt		
2014	Stefanie Arielle Busgang; Margaret Marie Keener; Emily Denison Markert; Elizabeth Anne Skerritt; Sooyoung Yoo		
2013	Angela Hu Mischa Lasow Hieu Trong Tran Nicole Vlasic		
2012	Karen Chan; Emily Feinberg; Siqi Ngan		
2011	Jin Yeong Eom Maria Granato Aliyah Sanders		
2010	Ramon Lee Nadia Shobnam		
2009	Yoonah Chi; Kaitlin Hendrickx		
2008	Giovanti Davis Kirsi Tuomanen Hill		
2006	Mark Belinsky Rachael Schneider		
2005	Katie Wagenblass Jonathan Wildi		
2004	Patti Chan Cassie Duffy Ali Fenwick Amanda Johnson		
2003	Marisa Adelman Gaurav Agarwal Clarence Lin Michael McGovern Amanda Vickers		
2002	Bonnie Chen		
2000	Elias Fenton Aliza Katz		
1999	Magritte Hyman		
1998	Mimi Murray Shreyas Ravishankar Sarah Vance		
1997	Abby Patner; Kenjiro Tajima		Inaugural recipients
