= Robert Engman =

American sculptor (1927–2018)

- Engman with After B.K.S. Iyengar, Doylestown, PA (2016)
- Born: Robert M. Engman; 29 April 1927; Belmont, Massachusetts, U.S.
- Died: 4 July 2018 (aged 91); Bryn Mawr, Pennsylvania, U.S.
- Education: Rhode Island School of Design, BFA; Yale University, MFA (1955)
- Known for: Sculpture
- Notable work: Construction No. 1 (1961–1962); Triune (1975); After Iyengar (1975)
- Spouse(s): Margaret Engman (m. ~1955; div. 1977); Nancy L. Porter (m. 1985)

Robert Engman (April 29, 1927 – July 4, 2018) was an American sculptor with works in the permanent collection of the Hirshhorn Museum, MOMA, the Whitney Museum of American Art, numerous college museums, and private collections.

== Early life ==
Engman was born in 1927 to parents who had emigrated from Sweden. He joined the Navy at the age of 15, serving in World War II in the Pacific. He graduated from the Rhode Island School of Design with a BFA, and from Yale University with an MFA in Painting and in Sculpture (1955), where he studied with sculptor José de Rivera and Josef Albers. Albers wrote of him: “Only a few independent ones were courageous enough to concentrate on the plane—the in-between of volume and line—as a broad sculptural concept and promise.”

== Career ==
=== The Yale Years: 1953–1964 ===
Engman taught sculpture at Yale University, and, in 1960, was appointed director of Yale's sculpture program in its Graduate School of Fine Arts. He worked closely with Josef Albers, James Rosati, Ann Lehman, and Paul Rudolph, and produced his monumental work, Column, (1963) for Rudolph's new building for the Yale Art & Architecture program. Represented by Arthur and Madeleine Lejwa's influential Galerie Chalette in New York, his work attracted the attention of Joseph Hirshhorn, who began to actively collect Engman's sculptures.

=== Philadelphia and the Grand Scale: 1964–1978 ===
In 1964, Engman moved to Pennsylvania, where he became director of the University of Pennsylvania's graduate studies in sculpture. He was a frequent visiting critic at East Coast schools of art during his teaching career. In the 1960s and '70s, his career flourished, with successful New York gallery shows and larger and larger scale commissions, culminating in Triune,(1975) a 20-foot-high structure of interlocking bronze curves.

=== Haverford: the Private Studio: After 1978 ===
The physical effort required to complete Triune brought a check to Engman's artistic drive to "dominate the materials." In 1978, he changed his approach to art. With rare exceptions, Engman eschewed the factory approach to sculpture, preferring to personally construct his pieces. He retreated from the world of large-scale commissions, and began work on a series of more intimately-scaled pieces that did not require a workshop of helpers to complete.

== Theory of Sculpture ==
The sinuous curves of Engman's work are derived from the artist's explorations of minimal surfaces to generate sculptural form. Minimal surfaces are mathematically the most economical connections between loops or lines in three-dimensional space. Engman created assemblages of minimal surface configurations to form geometrically based sculptures that could, at the time of their production, be described mathematically only after they had been physically created in metal or wood. In Engman's own words, "they cannot be conceived of through any other system than that of the giving of substance to thought." Others have been fascinated with the science and mathematics of such surfaces, including the late R. Buckminster Fuller.

== Works ==
- A Study in Growth, (1958) in the MOMA permanent collection.
- Engman's work in the Hirshhorn is represented by two large scale pieces, Untitled, (1968–1969), and After Iyengar (1978), and upwards of thirty of his smaller works.
- Works in the Whitney: Construction, (1960), Moon, Number 2, (1964).
- His largest sculpture, Triune (1975), continues to stand at the southwest corner of Philadelphia City Hall.
- Kings (1975) is at 78th and Lindbergh Streets, also in Philadelphia.
- Students collaborated with Engman to create the Peace Symbol (1967) sculpture which was installed in front of the Van Pelt Library at Penn in 1983.
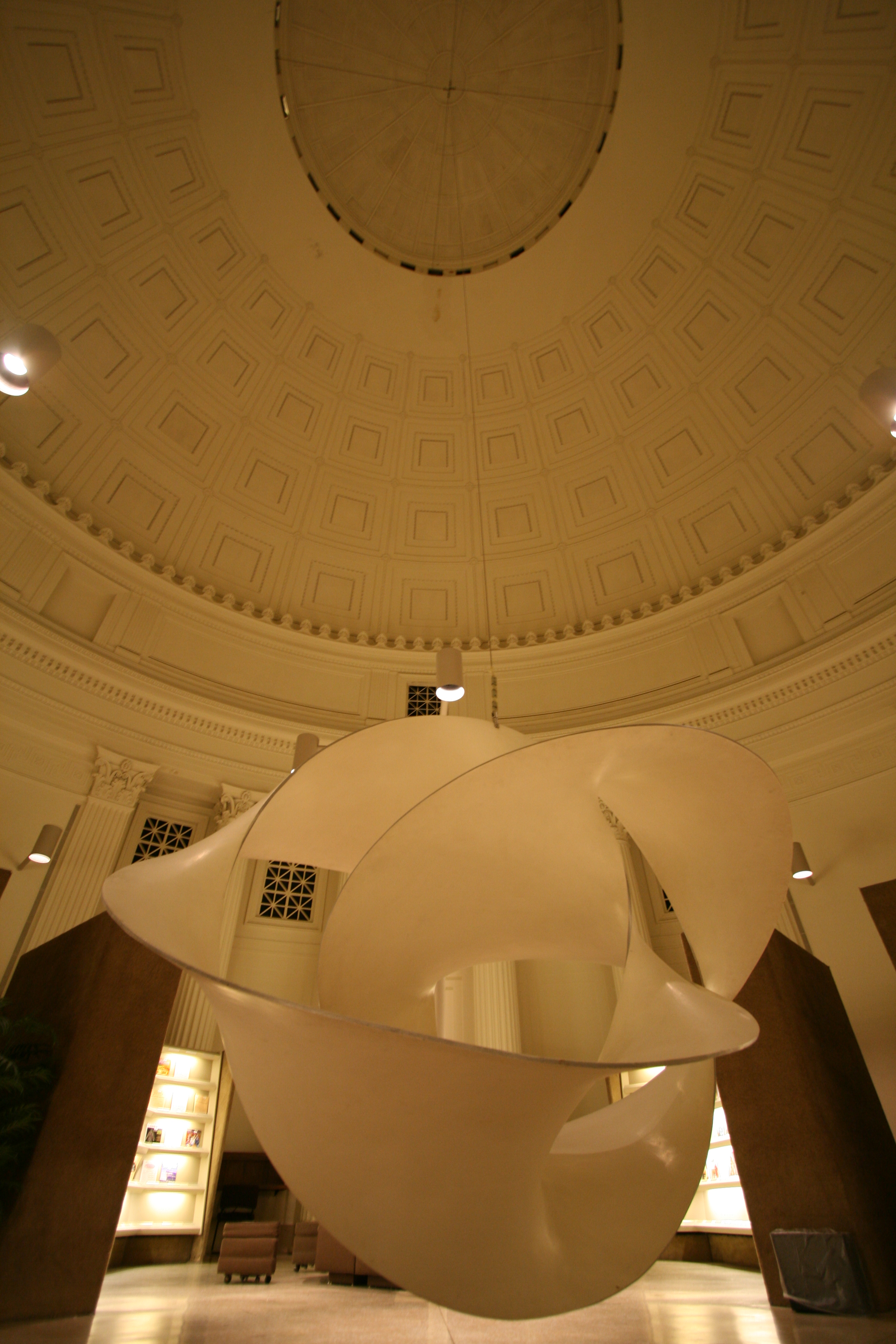
Untitled (1968), suspended inside the Great Dome at MIT

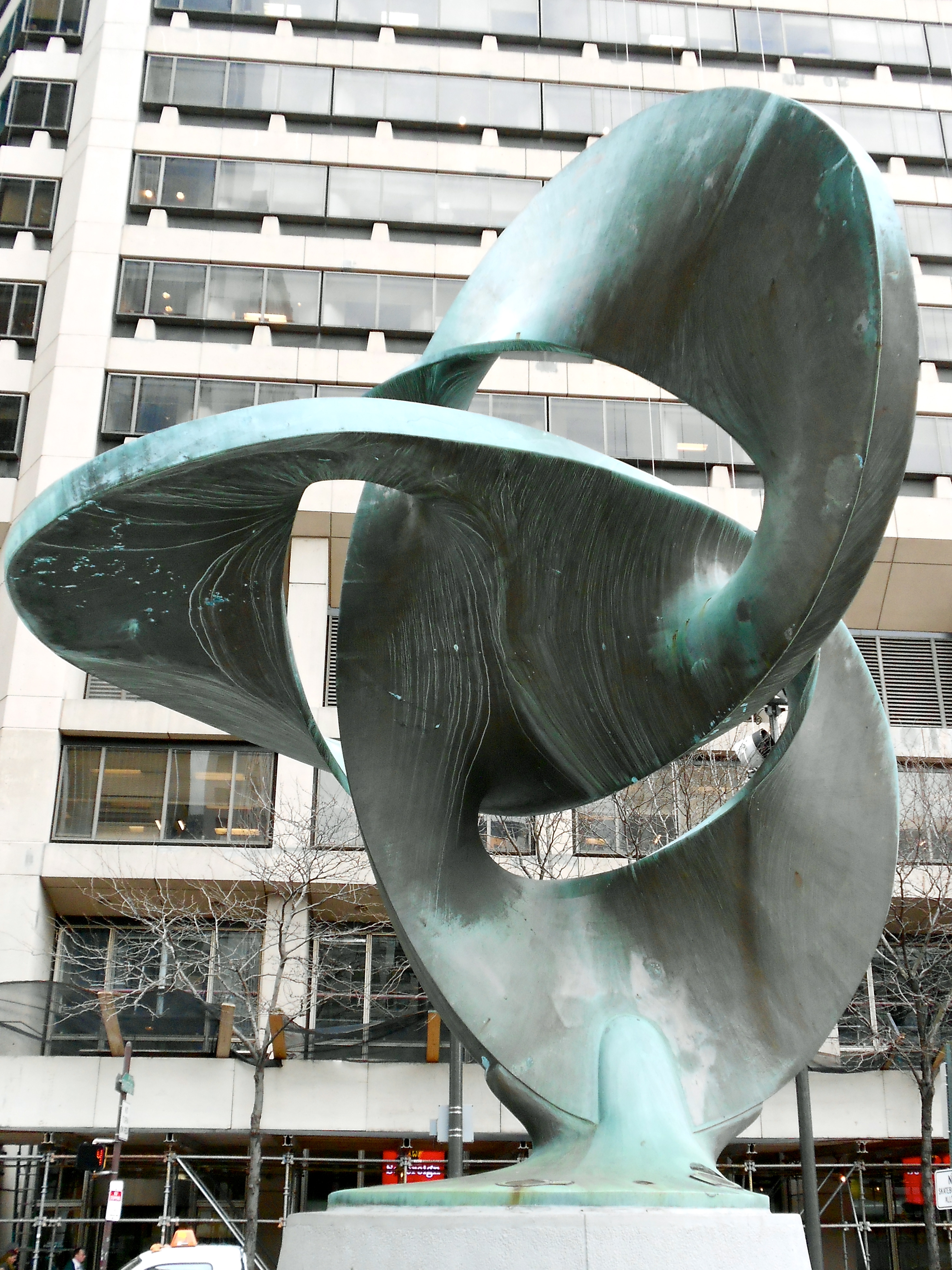
Triune (1975), near Philadelphia City Hall

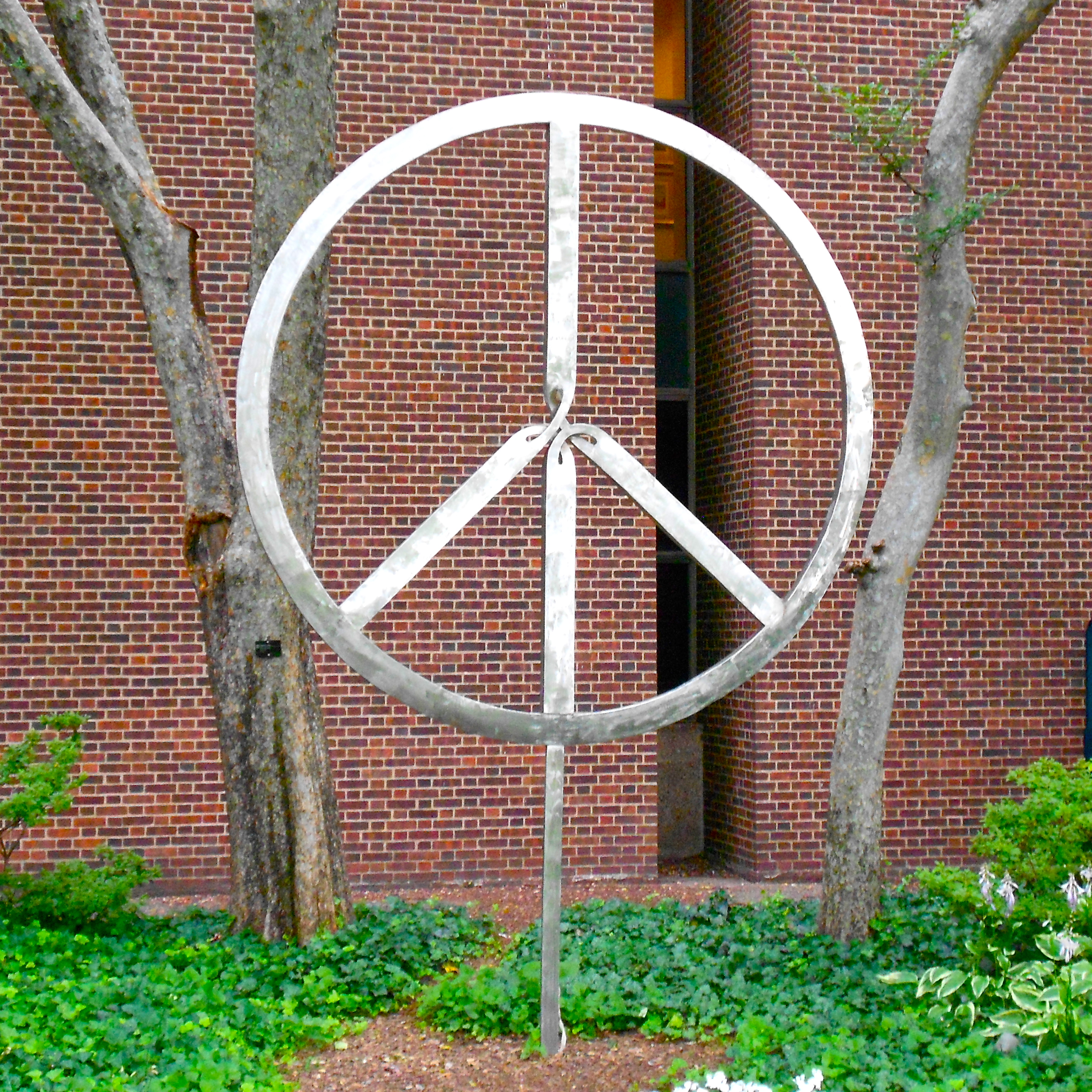
Peace Symbol (1967) was created in collaboration with Penn students

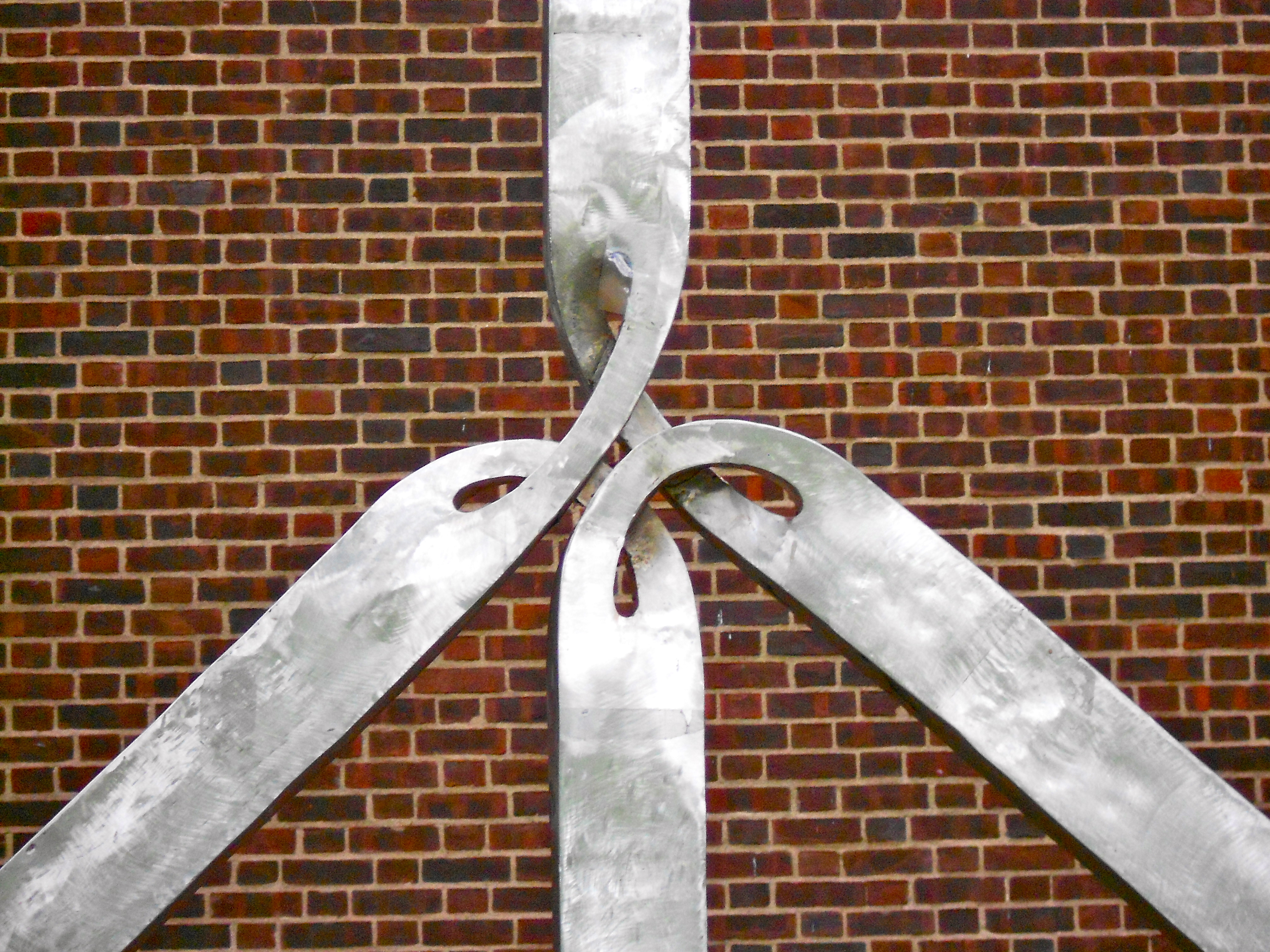
Peace Symbol, detail (1967)

== Exhibitions (not complete) ==
=== Group ===
Recent Sculpture U.S.A (May – Aug 1959) MOMA, New York, NY
Structured Sculpture (1960), Galerie Chalette, New York, NY
Modern Sculpture from the Joseph H. Hirshhorn Collection (Oct 1962 – Jan 1963), Solomon R. Guggenheim Museum, New York, NY
Annual Exhibition 1966: Contemporary Sculpture and Prints (Dec 1966 – Feb 1967), Whitney Museum of American Art, New York, NY

=== Solo ===
Recent Sculpture (Feb – Mar 1960), Stable Gallery, New York, NY
Shifting the Limits: Robert Engman’s Structural Sculpture (Oct 2016 – Feb 2017), James A. Michener Art Museum, Doylestown, PA
