= Deborah de Moulpied =

American artist (1933-2023)

- Born: November 22, 1933; Manchester, New Hampshire
- Died: December 24, 2023 (aged 90)

Deborah de Moulpied (1933 – 2023) was an American sculptor and educator. She is known for her early adoption of plastic as a sculptural medium.

== Biography ==
Moulpied was born on November 22, 1933, in Manchester, New Hampshire. She studied at the Boston Museum School of Fine Arts and the Yale School of Art. Her work was included in the 1968 Annual exhibition contemporary American sculpture at the Whitney Museum of American Art. Moulpied was the recipient of two MacDowell residencies.

Moulpied taught at the University of Bridgeport, William Paterson University, and the University of Maine.

Moulpied died on December 24, 2023. Her work is in the collection of the Museum of Modern Art.
