= Kent Bloomer =

American artist (1935–2023)

- Born: May 31, 1935; Mt. Vernon, New York
- Died: October 22, 2023 (aged 88)
- Education: Massachusetts Institute of Technology; Yale University
- Occupations: Sculptor and Ornamenter
- Website: kentbloomerportfolio.com

Kent Cress Bloomer (May 31, 1935 – October 22, 2023) was an American sculptor and ornamenter who taught architectural design in the Yale School of Architecture from 1966 to 2019. He was also Yale's Director of Undergraduate Studies in Architecture from 1974 to 1994. Bloomer considered the undergraduate major in architecture to be a subject within the humanities rather than a preparation for professional work. In 1978, Bloomer began teaching classes on the history and meaning of architectural ornament in built work and in writings throughout the history of architecture and, in 1984, he introduced his graduate seminar, "Ornament Theory and Design," that he taught until his retirement in the spring of 2019. His public works of sculpture and architectural ornament, such as the New York City Central Park luminaires and the Chicago Harold Washington Library ornament are well-known landmarks. He wrote articles on proprioception and the role of the haptic sense in experiencing architecture, on the place of ornament in architecture, and on the distinction between ornament and decoration. He was the principal author of Body, Memory, and Architecture, cowritten with Charles Moore, 1977, and author of The Nature of Ornament, Rhythm and Metamorphosis in Architecture, published in 2000 .

== Education ==
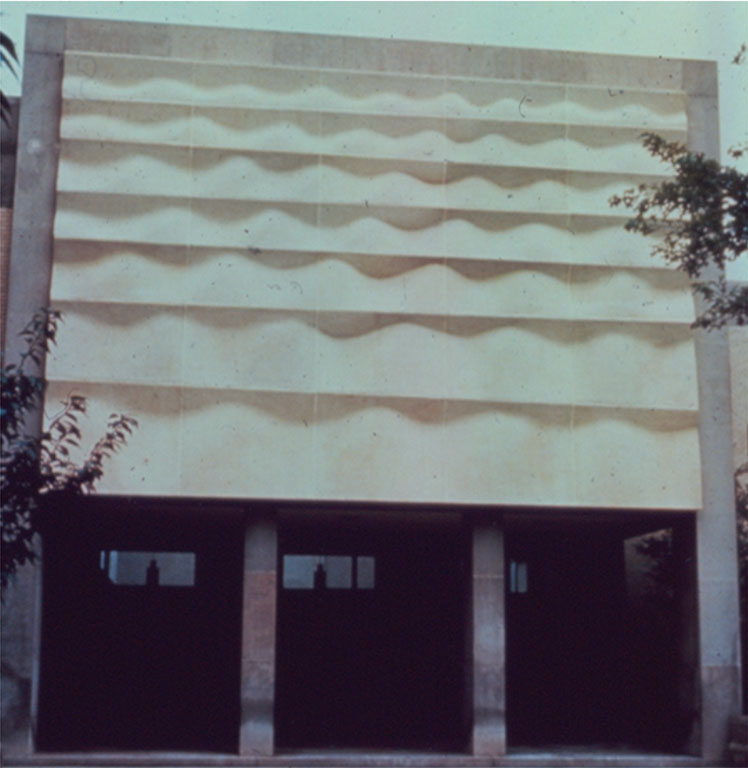
Pittsburgh's Rodef Shalom Congregation, 1965

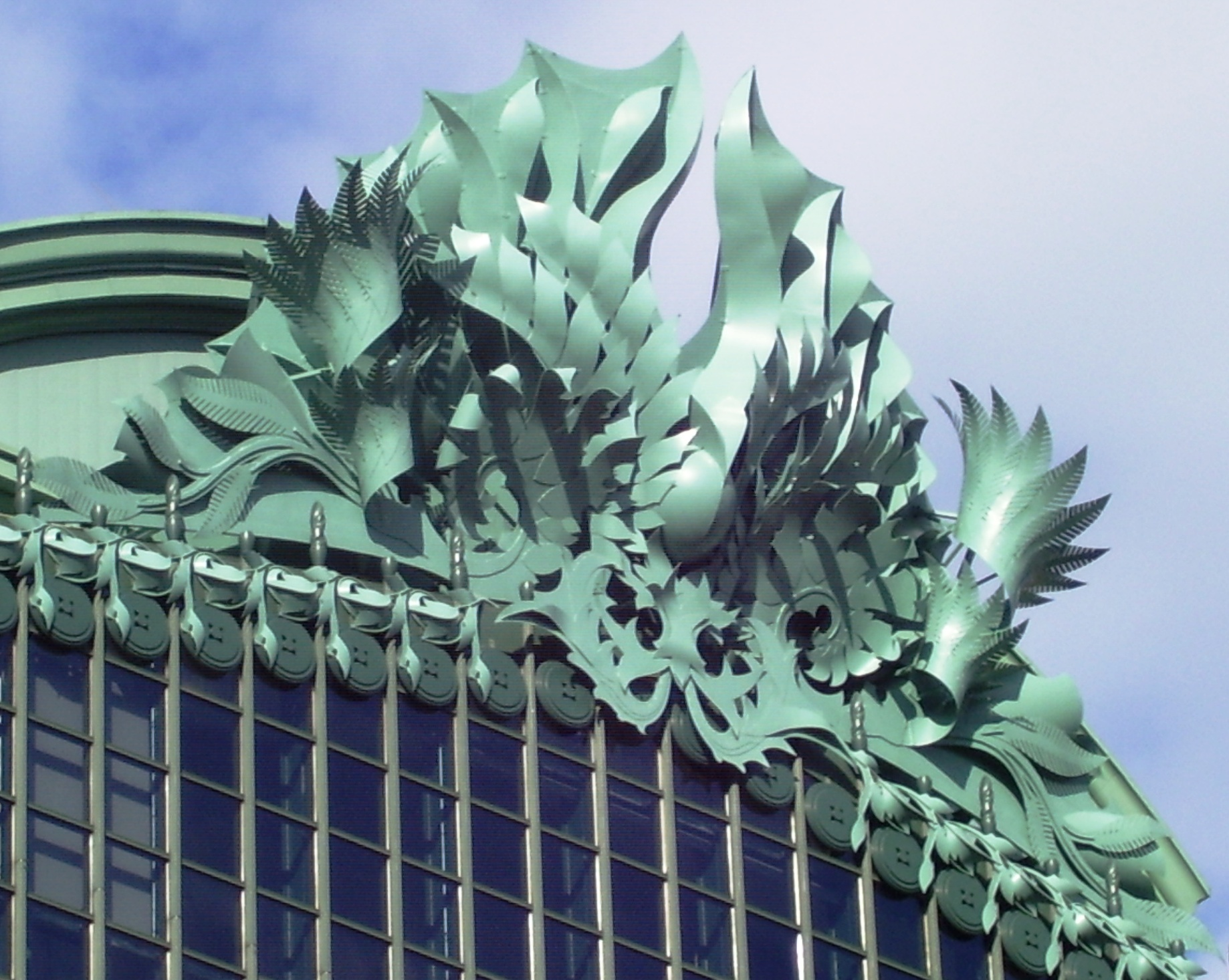
Chicago's Harold Washington Library's southern acroterion, 1993

Bloomer graduated from St. Luke's School in New Canaan, Connecticut, in 1953. The 1953 Caduceus yearbook, of which he was editor, described 18-year-old Bloomer in the following way: "Kent is best known for three things: his art proficiency, his acid technique as a jazz drummer, and his colossal brain, usually functioning along the more abstract line." He studied at the Massachusetts Institute of Technology from 1953 to 1957, where he had a double major in physics and architecture. Following the advice of his M.I.T. professors, he transferred to the Yale Department of Design to study sculpture under Erwin Hauer and Josef Albers of the Weimar Bauhaus who was then the department chairman. He received his BFA from the Yale School of Art and Architecture in 1959 and his MFA in 1961.

== Career ==
Paul Schweikher, who had been chair of the Yale School of Architecture from 1953 to 1958, brought Bloomer to Pittsburgh in 1961 to teach basic design in the Carnegie Institute of Technology, (now Carnegie Mellon University), where he was currently head of the Carnegie School of Architecture. In Pittsburgh, Bloomer won the competition to design a bas-relief for the Rodef Shalom Temple, completed in 1965. That bas-relief represents Bloomer's first step away from his abstract-expressionist brass sculptures and his first move toward the public world of architecture and the cosmic world of ornament in architecture.

In 1966, Charles Moore, Dean of the Yale School of Architecture, brought Bloomer back to Yale to teach architectural design. With Moore, Bloomer became an integral player in the development of the Yale Building Project, working with students to design and build the critically praised New Zion Community Center in rural Kentucky.

Bloomer also relocated his studio to Guilford, Connecticut. The studio's large-scale work began with the installation of enormous aluminum "tree domes" within the WonderWall designed by Moore's firm, MLTW, for the 1984 New Orleans World's Fair. In 1995 Bloomer moved his studio to Erector Square in New Haven.

Bloomer retired from the Yale School of Architecture in May 2019 and discontinued his Bloomerstudio LLC in December 2019. Through his classes, writings, and studio work, he became influential in bringing the subject of ornament back into the discourse on architecture. He always insisted on the critical importance of including that subject in the curriculum of schools of architecture.

== Selected Kent Bloomer Studio Projects ==
- Temple Rodef Shalom, Pittsburgh, PA, portal bas-relief, 1965
- New York Botanical Garden, The Sculptors Guild, "Sculpture in the Garden," aluminum sculpture, 1981
- Central Park luminaires, NYC (w/Gerald Allen Architect), 1982
- New Orleans World's Fair, LA, "Tree Domes" (w/MLTW Architects), 1984
- St. Thomas Church vestry, NYC, foliated canopy and shield (w/Gerald Allen Architect), 1986
- University of Oregon Science Complex, Willamette Hall, "Physics Wall," atrium, and light standards (w/Ratcliff Architects; Moore Ruble Yudell Architects, and Brockmeyer McDonnell Architects), 1989
- Yale University colleges, Gothic luminaires, 1990
- Harold Washington Library Center, Chicago, IL, roof ornaments (w/HBRA Architects), 1993
- Kansas State University, Hale Library, stone and metal ornaments and railings (w/HBRA Architects and BBN Architects) 1996–97
- Duke Ellington Circle, NYC, Central Park West Street lightposts, 1997
- Ronald Reagan National Airport, window tracery (w/Cesar Pelli Architect), 1997
- Rice University, James A. Baker III Institute for Public Policy, Baker Hall exterior and interior ornament (w/HBRA Architects), 1997
- Great Platte River Road Archway Monument, spans Interstate 80, Kearney, NE, roof ornament and mural (w/Peter Dominick Architect), 2000
- Nashville Public Library, TN, entrance frieze (w/Robert A.M. Stern Architects), 2001
- Kentlands Community, Gaithersburg, MD,"acanthus chair circle," 2002
- Lakelands Community, Gaithersburg, MD, Market Square peristyle, frieze, and fountain, 2002
- Manhattan Public Library, 'Aesop's Fables' atrium trellis, Manhattan, KS (w/BBN Architects), 2002
- Rice University, McNair Hall, Jesse H. Jones Graduate School of Management, "New Jones School," entrance ornament and sculpture (w/HBRA Architects and Morris Architects), 2002
- Fair Haven Middle School, entrance lobby avian vaulted ceiling, New Haven, CT (w/Roth and Moore Architects), 2004
- Truman School entrance, New Haven, CT (w/Kenneth Boroson Architects), 2004
- Clinton School entrance, New Haven, CT (w/Kenneth Boroson Architects), 2005
- Yale University, Class of 1954 Chemistry Research Building, entrance gate (w/Bohlin, Cywinski, Jackson Architects), 2005
- Guru Nanak Gurdwara, interior atrium railings, Phoenix, AZ, 2006
- Yale University, Bass Library entrance pavilion and Sterling Library stairwell entrance ornament (w/HBRA Architects), 2007
- Yale University, Woolsey Hall display cases, 2007
- Yale University, Cullman-Heyman Tennis Center capitals (w/Centerbrook Architects), 2008
- Yale University School of Drama, University Theatre display cases, 2009
- Mauro-Sheridan Magnet School, New Haven, CT., entrance (w/Kenneth Boroson Architects), 2009
- 360 State Street, New Haven, CT, parking garage façade design and ornaments (w/Becker and Becker Associates), 2010
- Yale University Rosenkranz Hall gate (w/Koetter Kim and Associates), 2011
- DCCAH New York Avenue bridge, Washington, D.C., "Gateway Wings," 2013
- Slover Library, Norfolk, VA, atrium, façade, and loggia ornament (w/Newman Architects), 2014
- West Springfield Public Library, West Springfield, MA, window grille (w/Centerbrook Architects), 2015
- 8300 Wisconsin Avenue, Bethesda, MD; façade, sculpture, lampposts (Stonebridge), 2016
- Bridge School, Shanghai, China, "Puzzle Ball" and "Dragon Gate," 2018
- Guru Nanak Dwara Gurdwara, Phoenix, AZ, "Lotus Luminaires," 2019
- Market Square North, 401 9th St. NW, Washington, D.C., "Foliation" (Boston Properties), 2020
- "The Dovecote," 11 West 126th St., NY (PBDW Architects; David Finehirsh developer) ornamental panels designed in 2016; building completed posthumously in 2024

== Writings ==
=== Selected Articles ===
- Journal of Architectural Education, vol. 29, no. 1, [Guest Editor], "Prologue" and "The Body Matrix," [1975]
- Interiors, July 1979 "Have You Heard of Haptic?" 1979
- Dichotomy, vol. 3, no. 2, University of Detroit School of Architecture, "The Exclusion of Sculpture and Painting from Buildings," 1980
- Perspecta 23, Yale School of Architecture and Rizzoli, "Botanical Ornament: the Continuity and the Transformation of a Tradition," 1987
- CRIT 21, Student AIA, Fall 1988, "The Hybrid Nature of Ornament," 1988
- Places, vol. 7, no. 4, "The Confounding Issue of Collaboration Between Artists and Architects," 1992
- Inland Architect, March/April 1992, "Spatial Language: the Ornament of the Harold Washington Library," 1992
- L'Architecture d'Aujourd'hui, 333, mars-avril, Paris, "The Formation of Ornament," 2001
- 306090, vol. 10, "A Critical Distinction Between Decoration and Ornament," 2006
- Swiss Architecture Museum, no. 5, Re-sampling Ornament, "Ornament or Decoration?" 2008
- T3xture, no. 2, October 2015, "Ornament is Splendid! A Conversation with Kent Bloomer, Ornamenter," 2015
- T3xture, no. 2, October 2015, "Ornament as Distinct from Decoration," with John Kresten Jespersen, Ph.D., 2015
- Donner Institute Approaching Religion, vol. 6, no. 2, "Art Approaching Science and Religion," "[The Greeks] Called it KOSMOS, Which Means Ornament," 2016

=== Selected Chapters in Books ===
- Charles Moore, Buildings and Projects 1949-1986, ed. by Eugene J. Johnson, Rizzoli, 1986, "Form, Shape, and Order in the Work of Charles Moore"
- Turner Brooks: Work, Princeton Architectural Press, 1995, "Figures in the Landscape"
- Biophilic Design: The Theory, Science and Practice of Bringing Buildings to Life, ed. by Stephen R. Kellert, Judith Heerwagen, and Martin Mador, Wiley, 2008, "The Picture Window: the Problem of Viewing Nature Through Glass"
- Architects & Mimetic Rivalry: René Girard, Léon Krier, Samir Younés, Kent Bloomer, ed. by Samir Younés, Papadakis, 2012, "The Sacrifice of Ornament in the 20th Century"
- Exploring the Work of Edward S. Casey: Giving Voice to Place, Memory, and Imagination, ed. by Donald Landes and Azucena Cruz-Pierre, Bloomsbury Academic, 2013, "Place(s) of Ornament"
- Kent Bloomer Nature as Ornament, ed. by Sunil Bald and Gary Huafan He, [Yale Festschrift publication], Yale School of Architecture, c2020, "Theory and Design of Ornament"

=== Books ===
- Bloomer, Kent (principal author) and Charles W. Moore, Body, Memory, and Architecture, Yale University Press, 1977; (Translations: Japanese 1980, German 1980, Italian 1981, Spanish 1982, Chinese 1983, Polish 2000)
- Bloomer, Kent, The Nature of Ornament, Rhythm and Metamorphosis in Architecture, W.W. Norton, 2000
