= Modular music =

Music made by combining different compositions

Modular music is music that originates from the combination and overlapping of different compositions one over the other. The compositions —also called modules— are written by one or many different composers in different moments. New modules can be added or removed to create a totally new work, a new composition, different from the original one. A modular composition can be expanded and extended in time, space and size.

== Origins ==
In the high Medieval times, French monks discovered that superimposing two melodies and playing them contemporaneously would generate interesting acoustics. They really witnessed innovative acoustic combinations: the counterpoint; at first applied exclusively to voices, it came to fruition in Renaissance. The term originates from the Latin punctus contra punctum, meaning "point against point".

== Theorist ==
The modular method in music has been theorized in 1998 by an Italian composer and arts theoretician, Stefano Vagnini, who developed his theory of open-source composition based on modular aggregation. Writer, painter, and art theorist Gian Ruggero Manzoni described the modular music of Vagnini's compositions as “circular like the existence, his works are not finished, but merely stimulus for new voices”. Greek history university professor Umberto Bultrighini describes "Vagnini Modular Music’s ability to satisfy old needs and combine them with modern technology. ModulArt as the key answer to the need of defining the artist's work, finding the right balance between art, audience and copyrights".

== Modular method in music ==
By combining compositions rather than melodies, one obtains a modular project. The term “project” is more appropriate than “composition” because the shape of the work is not fixed and it will change when a new composition (module) is added or removed. The concept of a musical work seen as something closed, limited and immobile evolves into a process of numerous aggregations that allow a composition to become infinite in principle. A modular project is a work in progress. Once a composition is completed, anyone can join in and take part to it, by adding new modules or even by removing modules that are considered unsuitable. The original module attracts new artists and stimulates them to create new works or compositions to be combined with the pre-existing modules. Each module, in turn, may become an original piece, a new starting point for other artists to join in and start a new process of aggregation. There are no limits; each composer or artist is free to manage his or her material, add or remove modules in any way or form, without changing the original works created by another modular composers. The only rule of the modular method is that none is allowed to modify a module: composers can choose a combination of modules, can add his/her own works but cannot absolutely modify a pre-existing module.

In music history, however, there are examples of famous composers using the modular method unaware: Charles Gounod (1818–1893) composed his famous Ave Maria by adding a melody to the I Prelude in C major from Das Wohltemperierte Klavier by J. S. Bach (1685–1750). Neither one of the two composers willingly adopted the modular method of composition for their respective works; however, these are examples of modular music.

Furthermore, the term Modular and/or Modular Music is often applied nowadays to Electronic Music especially: examples can be found in the Serge synthesizer, Modular synthesizer, in the work of composer and performer Scot Gresham-Lancaster, one of the early pioneers of "computer network" music which uses the behavior of interconnected music machines to create innovative ways for performers and computers to interact. Electronic music composer André Stordeur who composes exclusively on Serge synthesizer and in 2009 appeared on a version of Giacinto Scelsi's Tre Canti Popolari, published by the Sub Rosa (label), where he played electronic distortion of live instruments. The music of Disc Jockey can be as well considered a modern example of modular music, where different and independent modules are mixed rather than overlapped, played simultaneously and the third modules represented by the Dj him/herself who interacts with the two ongoing modules (tracks).

== Technique ==
“In the initial approach, the artist may choose any style, instrument and musical form, with no limits for the composer’s creativity“, whatsoever. “Once the first musical work is completed, which will be defined as Module A or original module, it becomes an opportunity for new composers to develop it by extending its dimension, fully respecting its integrity. Modular composers, stimulated by the original work, may in turn add their own creations, again expanding the original piece. This creates a hierarchy of modules. The first composition, the original module, becomes module A, the second or additional work added by another modular composer, becomes module B, and so on“.

=== Continuous aggregations ===
“Once located the original module (A), the composer of successive modules will aggregate with module B anticipating performance of his composition to be executed with the original module. The following solutions therefore: A, or A+B. Upon the superimposition of ulterior modules (C, D, E…), the composition is well into the process of extension. The execution or performance of the individual pieces B and C as autonomous compositions is not expected. Not to be excluded the possibility of accepting modules B or C as original in terms of developing and expanding the creation replacing module A. In fact nothing is to prevent further development by a third composer ignoring modules B or C and creating a new B module which will inaugurate a new expansionary orientation. This is referred to as Parallel Aggregations“.

=== Independent aggregations ===
“When it is possible to perform the various modules according to a random selection, it becomes an independent aggregation. The original module A may be performed alone or in combination with the modules B and C. The same can be said for each module A, B and C. The letters associated with each module are chronological references as to when the works were composed. Any combination is therefore possible: A, A+B, B, B+C, A+C, C, A+B+C“.

=== Mixed aggregations ===
“Modular scores may be developed on various planes (continuous aggregations and independent aggregations) each following their developmental criteria and rules of combination.

The aggregation to a modular project may in turn be constructed following the modular method described; that, which is valid for the macro-structure, is applicable to the internal development of individual modules, thus creating further sub module aggregations limited, however, in the level of intervention therefore establishing:

=== Negative aggregations ===
One exception to the rule which prohibits modifications to existing modules retained valid, is a particular case of aggregation: negative aggregation or of silences. Although there are no changes to the fundamental score in existence, the application of silences suppresses and eliminates some precise moments. Silences obscure, not because of disapproval but for added stimulation not as a result of what it did not do but a conquest of making an algebraic negative sign resulting in a spectacular motion of opposing an aggregation already occurred.“

== Composers ==
=== Composers ===
Since 2000 the modular methodology has been spread involving worldwide composers through many modular projects. Several such compositions were performed in Europe, South America, Asia and in North America and discussed through conferences in Europe and in the United States. The approach is being academically discussed at the University of West Georgia and the Carrollton Cultural Arts Centre in the USA, at the “G. D’Annunzio” University of Chieti–Pescara Italy, and at the University of Strathclyde in Glasgow, Scotland. Minas Borboudakis has dedicated the third part of his trilogy ROAI III for piano and electronics to the modular methodology. The composer Andy DiGelsomina has featured variations on the modular approach in his recent "Lyraka Symphony no. 1", which he elaborates on (with musical examples) in his personal blog.

== Modularity and other art languages ==
=== Visual art ===
Modularity can be applied to every language of art in many different ways.

Marcel Duchamp's intervention on Leonardo Da Vinci’s Mona Lisa: the moustache is, in all ways, a modular effect. Greek-born conceptual artist Leda Luss Luyken, who was initially trained as an architect, has been exploring ModulArt in the medium of painting since the 1990s. In her work, standardized canvas panels are mounted as modules onto a steel frame within which they can be moved and rotated. American artist Mitzi Cunliffe developed sculptures consisting of multiple blocks about twelve inches square which she put together in a variety of combinations to give a sculptured effect on a large scale. Another portfolio of interactive modular art comes out of Studio for A.R.T. and Architecture, a New York-based firm headed by Donald Rattner. Rattner has designed modular art in the media of wall sculpture, rotational paintings, tapestries, artist's wallpapers and artist's books. The Gruppo 1, made up of Biggi, Frascà, Pace, Santoro, Uncini and Carrino, in the 1960s elaborated a conception of sculpture being a collective project with works developed by assembling basic elements—modules, in the true sense of the word — which could be modified in any moment, sometimes with the intervention of the public. The term modular applied to visual arts was first mentioned in 1975 in a German arts encyclopedia as "a form of art […] made by movable elements that […] transfer the object into a new state of being by moving their variable parts"

=== Poetry ===
SalmodieSubliminali (Campanotto Editions, Udine, 2007) is a book of modular poems in which Stefano Vagnini connects words so that new meanings comes out from the sentence. Every line can be extended with new words, always connected.

=== Polimediality ===
When different languages coexist, multimediality becomes a natural opening for the modular work. The artist's desire to experiment is combined with the necessity to adapt to codes and communicative languages in constant evolution. Using at the same time different languages is not just the research of innovative aesthetic solutions, superficial strategy used to capture who enjoys with distraction; multimediality becomes, by modular art, a natural answer to the artist that wants to join the project. In Modular Music, the term polymediality is preferred, because a multimedia work is usually already conceived as a multi-art language work. In a modular project, the opportunity to add modules using different languages depends on the artist who decides to join the work.

=== Coexistence of cultures ===
In a modular project, many different cultures can coexist in the project without having to use a hybrid language. Coexistence so that people can enjoy the taste of the combination of different cultural expressions and traditions. Modular art must be considered an alternative to that phenomenon called contamination.

== Modular projects ==
- Via Crucis
- Zoo
- Zero
- Aenigma
- Messa Picena

=== ModulArt performances ===
- Back to Bach
- Sconcerto
- Gabersuite
- SacrAriae
- Small Packages from Italy
- Visions
- The Gothic Dream
- Sweet Suite Life
- Volare
- FaceBach
- Sono Ergo Sum

=== Via Crucis ===
Stefano Vagnini's 2002 modular oratorio depicting the fourteen Stations of the Cross, Via Crucis, composition for organ, computer, choir, string orchestra and brass quartet. Via Crucis represents Stefano Vagnini’s first intuition of the process of aggregations and the demonstration of the potential of the method. It is an oratorio made by continuous modules composed by the same musician in different moments.

- Originary Module - A: organ (two manuals and pedalboard) is the first module; it is divided into 14 movements, one for each station.

Being the original module, it may be presented to the public solo, for a total length of 50 minutes.

- Module - B: computer is to be overlapped to the stations I, II, IV, VIII, IX, XII and XIV with synchronism.
- Module - C: 4 voice choir is a four mixed voices choir for each station except the 5th.

The text is in latin from the Vulgata. Even the internal module D structure is modular: the soprano part can be performed without the choir. The choir parts in the stations no. 3, 7 and 9 are overlapped in the 12th.

- Module - D: strings orchestra – The percussion (included in the score) is optional and can be considered a submodule of module E.
- Module E: brass quartet (two trumpets, horn and trombone) is the last module composed up to now and it can be added to the stations IV, V, VI, X, XI, XIII, XIV.
- Module – F : video is a video by the photographer-producer Paolo Del Bianco, not synchronized to the music.

=== Zoo world modular project ===
Zoo is a modular project made by independent modules created by worldwide composers over eight piano works by Stefano Vagnini. A typical characteristic of the project's performances is the lack of a stage and seating arrangements for the audience, who walk freely through the performance space (e.g. a garden, square, or shopping mall), while the musicians are stationed throughout the space and acoustically isolated such that their individual performances cannot all be heard at once. This means each audience member's experience of the performance is unique, depending on the path they take through the space and the precise moments they happen to be in proximity to each individual musician. The Zoo world modular project currently comprises the following composers: Martin Vitous (Czech Rep.), George Christophy (Cypro), Anthony Green (U.S.A), Johannes Holik (Austria), Erik Schwartz (U.S.A), Heinz Chur (Germany), Phillip Wilcher (Australia), Ichinose Kyo (Japan), Julian Yu (China), John Sharply (Singapore), Slava Vinokur (Israel), Paul Gordon Manners (England), Giorgia Ragni (Italy). The Zoo project has been performed since 2000:

- June 2002, Festival Villa e Castella, art director Nino Finauri
- May 2009, Sunny Isles Beach Miami (Florida, U.S.A), in collaboration with Sunny Isles Beach government, Miami Art Charter School and the Arts ballet Theater of Florida.

=== FaceBach ===
The FaceBach project, organized by Strathclyde University Choir Director Alan Tavener, was performed on 15 June 2012, at the Barony Hall Glasgow as closing workshop on Modular Music featuring the Strathclyde Barony Hall organ students and AiDADUO (Stefano Vagnini and Giorgia Ragni). Some J. S. Bach organ music selection has been combined with contemporary music by Karlheinz Stockhausen, Tan Dun, Cathy Berberian, John Cage, Stefano Vagnini and Omega Zero.

=== Sono Ergo Sum Festival ===
Sono Ergo Sum is the first modular music festival. The first edition took place in Fano (Italy) on 17, 18 and 19 July 2014, at the San Domenico pinacoteque.

In 2018, Following the "Sono Ergo Sum" experience and concept Stefano Vagnini wrote the book -Ergo Sum, deep music experience-, a new program/therapy which combines music with mathematics in order to re-organize and rehabilitate emotional disorders and slow down degenerative diseases (Dementia and Alzheimer).

== Related art movements ==
- Generative Art
- Minimalism
- Serial Art
- Systems Art
- Conceptual Art

== Literature about modular art ==
- The Modular Method in Music, by Stefano Vagnini, English and Italian, 161 pp, Rome: Falcon Valley Music, 2002.
- Leda Luss Luyken: ModulArt, ed. by Georg von Kap-herr, with contributions by Prof. Paul Schilfgaarde and Dr. Joachim Kaske, English and German, 112 p, Bobingen, 2008.
