= Modular art =

Modular art is art created by joining together standardized units (modules) to form larger, more complex compositions. In some works the units can be subsequently moved, removed and added to – that is, modulated – to create a new work of art, different from the original or ensuing configurations.

== Origins ==
Historically, alterable objects of art have existed since the Renaissance, for example, in the Triptych "The Garden of Earthly Delights" by Hieronymus Bosch or in the so-called "alterable altarpieces", such as the Isenheim Altarpiece by Matthias Grünewald, or Albrecht Dürer's Paumgartner altarpiece, where changing motifs could be revised in accord with the changing themes of the ecclesiastical calendar.

== 20th century ==
Beginning in the first half of the 20th century, a number of contemporary artists sought to incorporate kinetic techniques into their work in an attempt to overcome what they saw as the predominantly static nature of art. Alexander Calder's mobiles are among the most widely known demonstrations of physical dynamism in the visual arts, in which form has the potential to continually vary through perpetual motion, sometimes even without the agency of the human hand. Jean Tinguely's efforts to create a self-destructive art machine constitute perhaps the ultimate expression of art's mutability, in this case by taking the form of its total eradication. Victor Vasarely postulated in his Manifest Jaune in 1955 in Paris that works of art should feature the properties of being multiplicable and repeatable in series. More recently, the notion that visual art need not be conceived solely in terms of perpetually fixed objects is embodied in performance and installation art by virtue of their unfolding and temporary qualities.

=== Industrial design and architecture ===
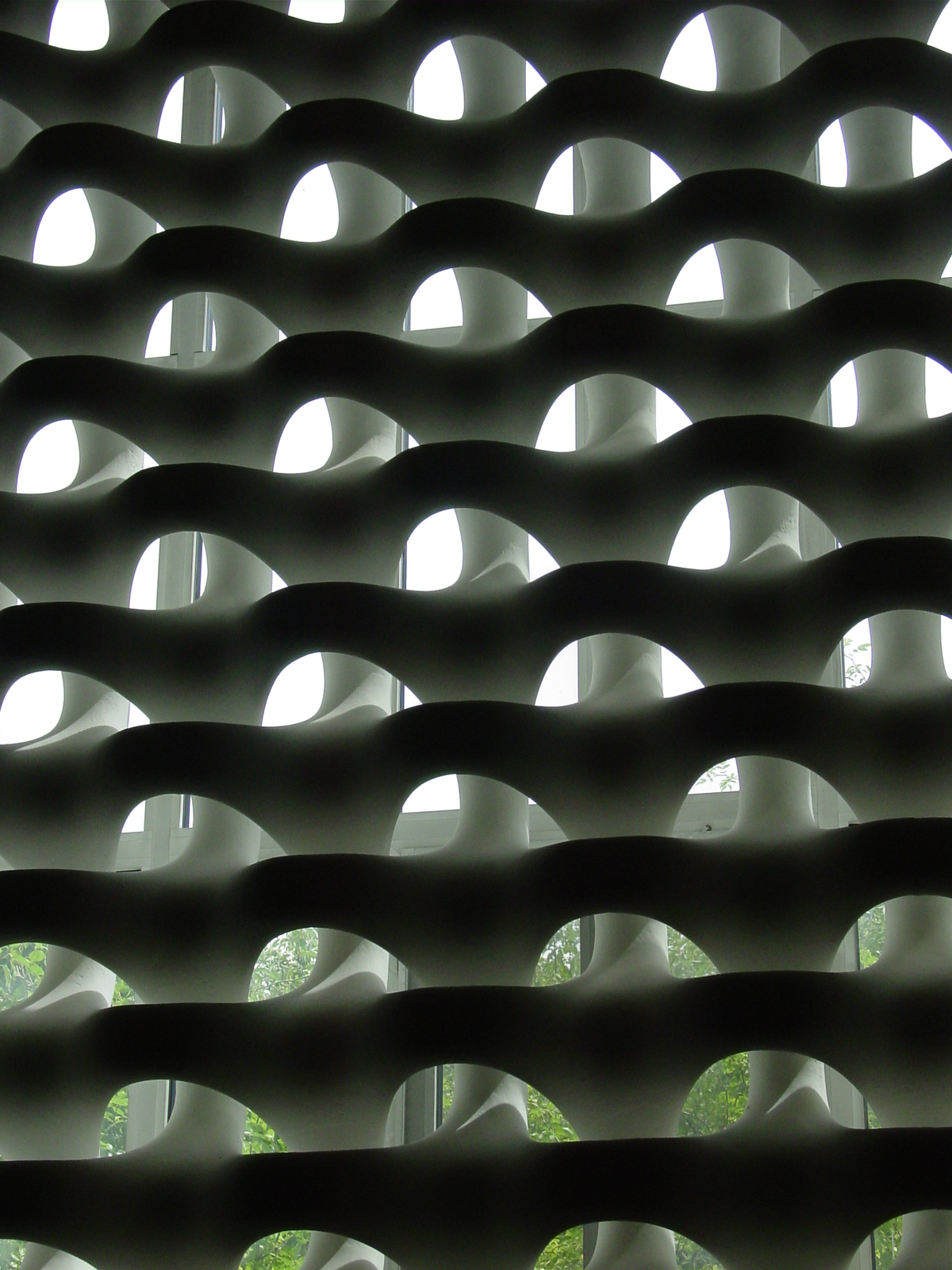
An architectural screen by Erwin Hauer.

Modularity enters the modern artistic repertory largely through the disciplines of industrial design and architecture. Belgian architect Louis Herman De Koninck led a team of countrymen in creating one of the first modular product systems in their Cubex kitchen series of 1932. The series consisted of standardized and industrially produced components that could be combined and arrayed in limitless combinations to accommodate almost any size kitchen. New York designer Gilbert Rohde crafted several lines of modular casework for the Herman Miller Corporation in the 1930s and 40s; like De Koninck, Rohde standardized the units in dimensions, materials and configurations to facilitate mass production and interchangeability. His Executive Office Group (EOG) line, launched in 1942, was a similarly ground-breaking systems approach to office furniture. Just a year before Eero Saarinen and Charles Eames had jointly produced a suite of modular domestic furniture for the Red Lion Company, a result of a competition held by the Museum of Modern Art in New York. In 1950 Herman Miller brought out the EAS Storage Unit series by Charles and Ray Eames, a very successful modular shelving and wall unit system that remains in production today.

The module enjoys a long history in the realm of architecture. In antiquity architects utilized the module primarily as a unit of measurement guiding the proportions of plan and elevation. The Roman author and architect Vitruvius deployed the modular method in his descriptions of the classical orders and the composition of buildings in his treatise Ten Books on Architecture, the only complete text on architecture to survive from antiquity. Architects of the Renaissance perpetuated the Vitruvian system in their resurrection of the classical orders, a tradition which continues to the present day. Among modern architects, the module is frequently employed as a design and planning tool.

=== Modular constructivism ===
Architecture and modular sculpture intersected starting in the 1950s in the work of Norman Carlberg, Erwin Hauer and Malcolm Leland. All three received commissions to design perforated architectural screens built out of repetitive modular motives cast in concrete. Non-structural, the screens were used on building exteriors to divide space, filter light and create visual interest. Their work has come to be described as modular constructivism, reflecting both its compositional methodology and its architectural context. Each created stand-alone modular-themed sculptures into the 1960s and after as well.

=== Modularity in the fine arts ===
Robert Rauschenberg's "White Painting" of 1951 — consisting of just four equal white squares, with its geometry of interlocking forms — is among the earliest statements of modularity as an autonomous subject of art. Rauschenberg explored this theme that same year in a three- and seven-panel format; the linear array of rectangular panels in these versions suggests their potentially infinite replication. The cool abstraction of these canvases presages the emergence of modularity as a full-fledged topic of minimalist art in the 1960s. Tony Smith, Sol LeWitt, Dan Flavin and Donald Judd are among this school's most prolific exponents during the period. In particular, the work of Smith is key to understanding the transformation of modularity from a compositional and production tool into a broadly investigated artistic theme in its own right.

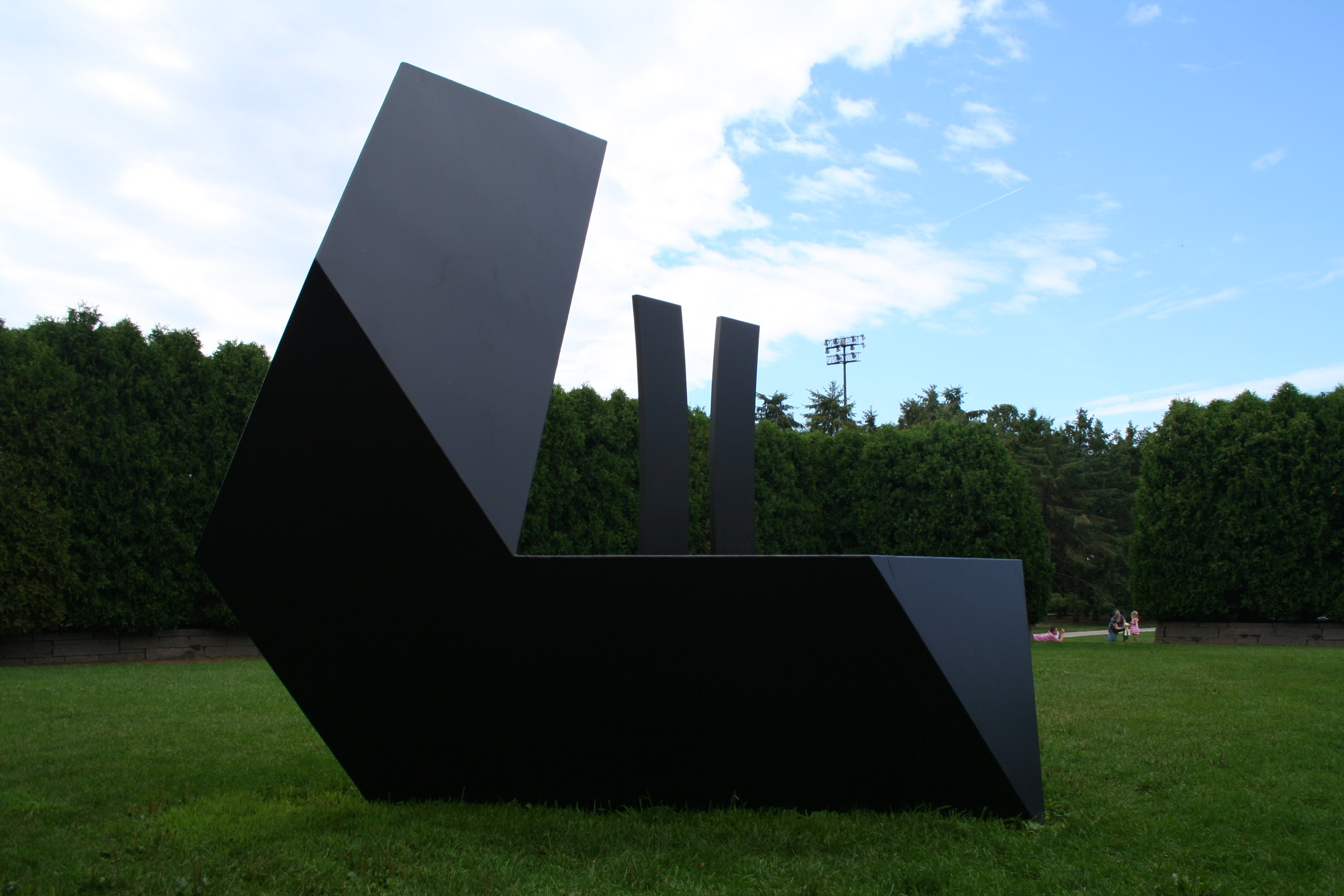
Amaryllis (1965), Tony Smith, Minneapolis, Minnesota.

Smith began his career as an architectural designer. To further his education he apprenticed himself on some projects by Frank Lloyd Wright for a couple of years starting in 1938. From Wright he learned to utilize modular systems in generating architectural designs in two-dimensional plans as well as in three-dimensional applications, such as the development of building sections and interior built-ins. As an architect, Wright himself was part of a centuries-old continuum stretching back through Vitruvius to Greco-Roman antiquity in which the module was utilized to proportion built and sculpted form. In the case of Wright, the interest in modular design also may have derived from his familiarity with modular practice in traditional Japanese architecture (such as tatami).

Wright's Hanna House of 1937 is a clear example of the master's facility with modern modular design in multiple dimensions. Its striking angled forms are built up from the individual hexagonal modules that define the floor plan and various vertical elements. Wright's use of the hexagon here is by no means an arbitrary aesthetic choice, but an example of how he rooted his architecture in nature by drawing from its forms and principles – the interlocking hexagonal cells of the bee's honeycomb being nature's most perfect representation of modular design. Not surprisingly, this project is sometimes referred to as the "Honeycomb House".

Smith would employ the hexagon and other elemental geometries in his own architectural practice and again in the sculpture he began to fabricate in the early 1960s. Freed from the programmatic and extensive structural requirements of his architectural work, Smith's sculptures are three-dimensional extrusions of modular form with no ostensible pragmatic purpose beyond aesthetic contemplation.

Significantly, Smith himself did not manually fabricate the final version of his sculptures. Instead, he outsourced their production to skilled ironworkers in foundries and industrial facilities, who worked off his drawings and models to manufacture the designs. In part this reflects Smith's training as an architect, who customarily designs and documents but does not construct his art. It further reinforces the idea of modular art as a generative system in which the arrangement of pre-determined formal units – rather than wholesale imaginative invention – defines the creative act. Finally, it is consistent with the notion implicit in modularity that the supply of modules in a modular system must be infinite, that is, that they be industrially rather than artisanally produced, for the system to be realized. (Bees in a honeycomb are essentially operating as an industrial enterprise insofar as the production of cells is without end.)

The work of Smith and the minimalist school constitute the most far-ranging exploration of modularity in art before the millennium. However, neither it nor the explorations of movable and alterable art in the preceding centuries synthesized the two central features of modular art. Mobiles and other kinetic pieces were not modular, and the modular work of the mid-century Minimalist artists was, with a few exceptions, not changeable.

== Theory in the 21st century ==
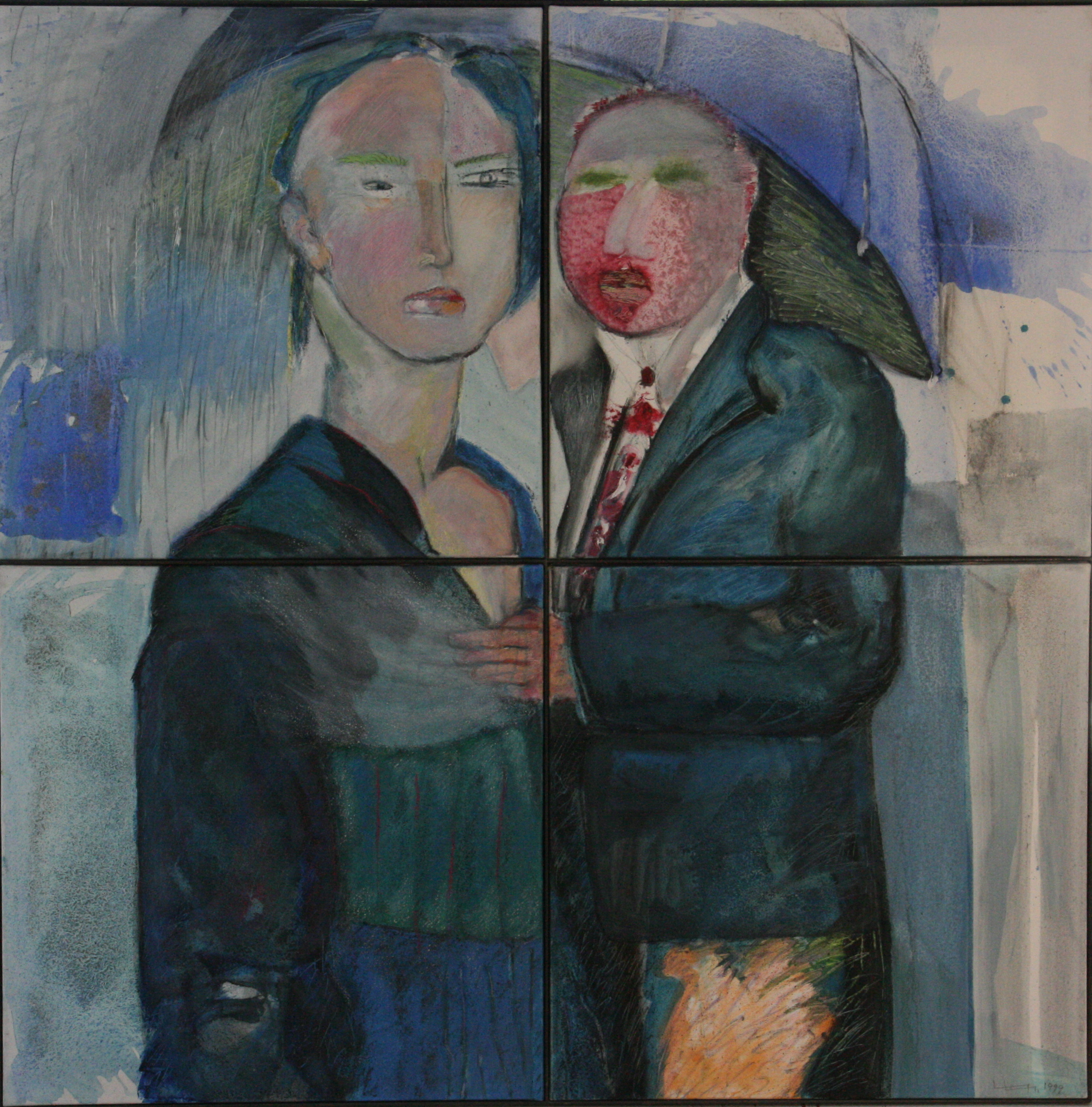
Leda Luss Luyken :ModulArt, The Couple.

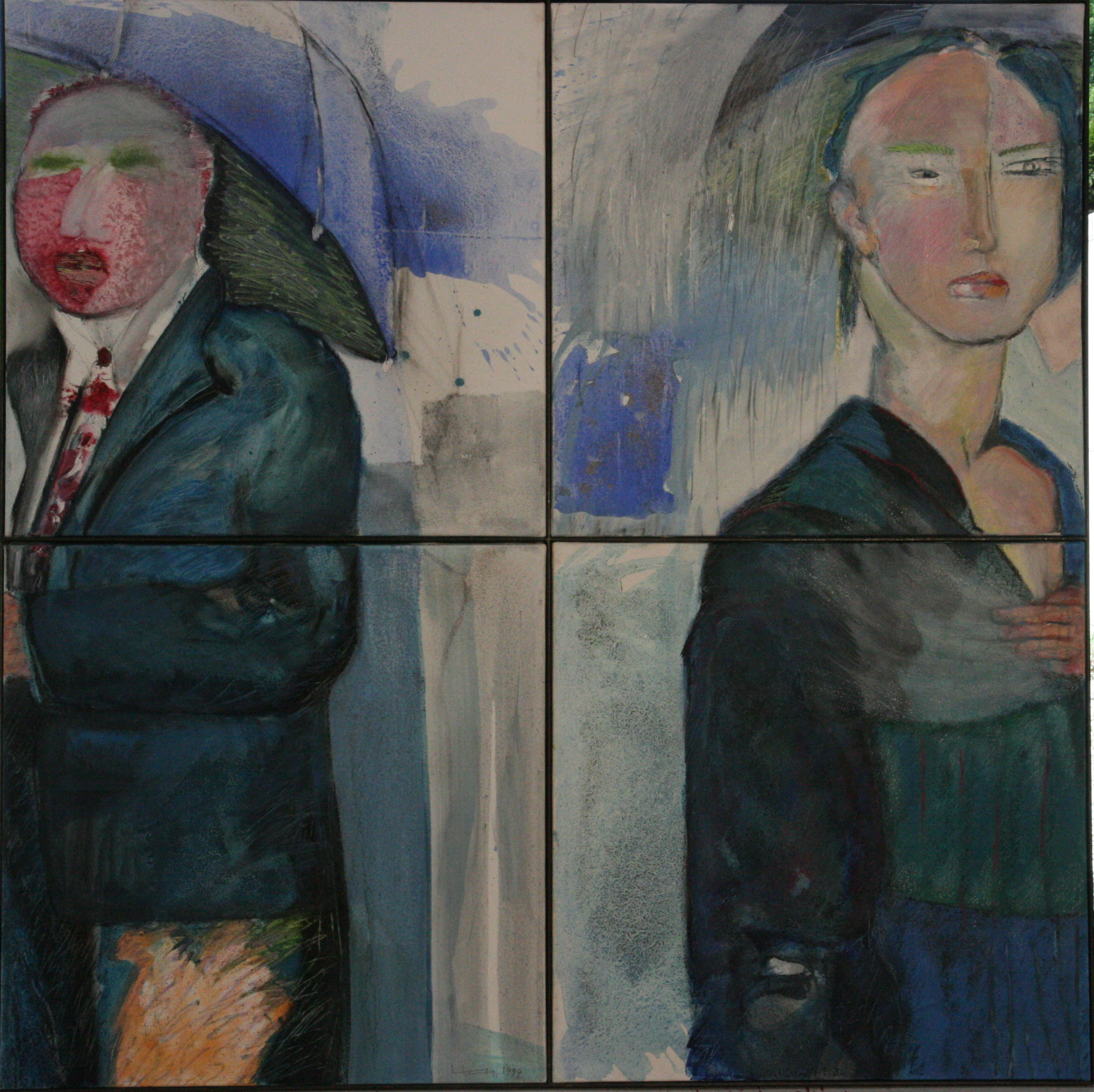
Leda Luss Luyken :ModulArt, The Couple, modulation 1.

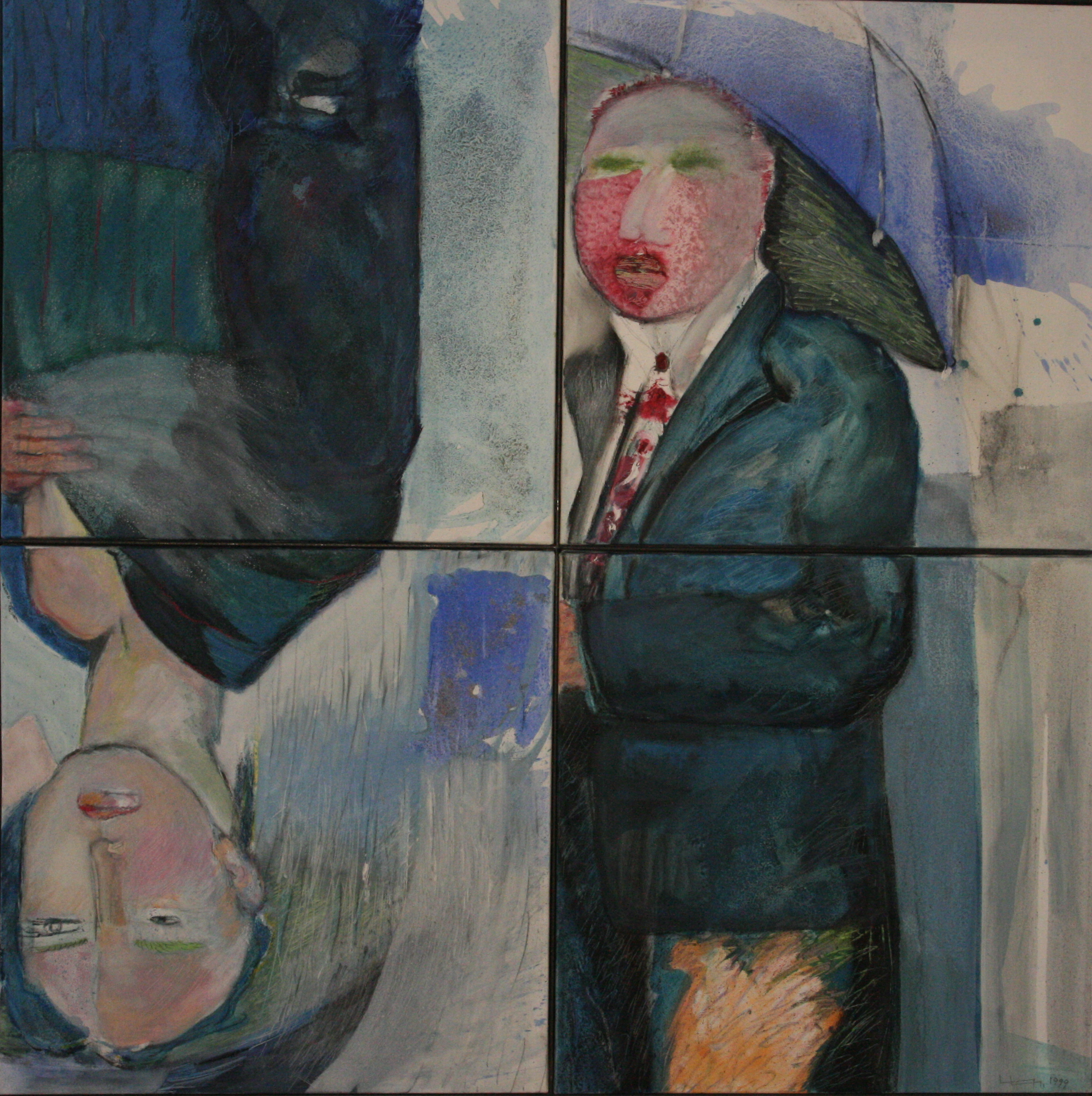
Leda Luss Luyken :ModulArt, The Couple, modulation 2.

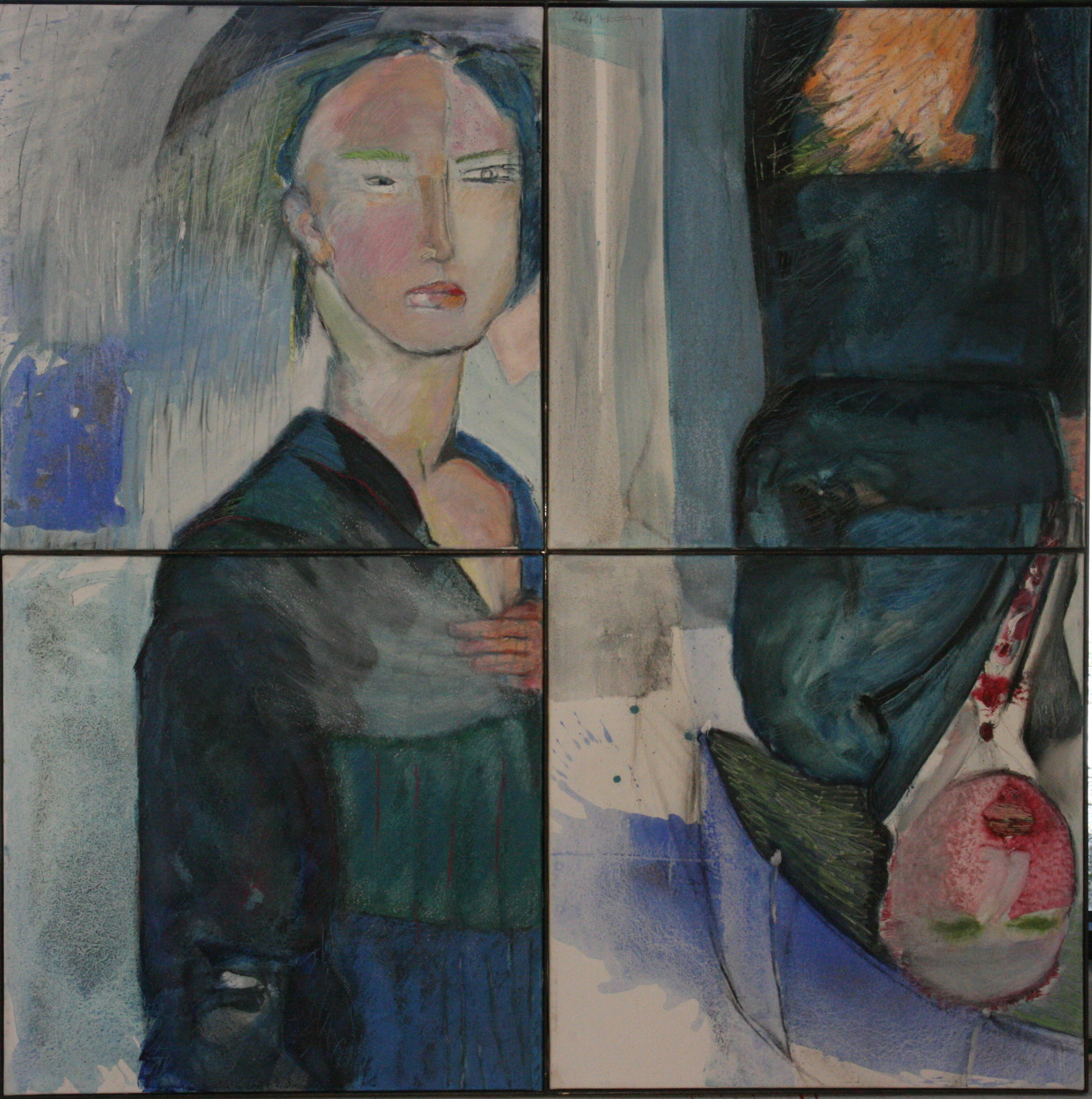
Leda Luss Luyken :ModulArt, The Couple, modulation 3.

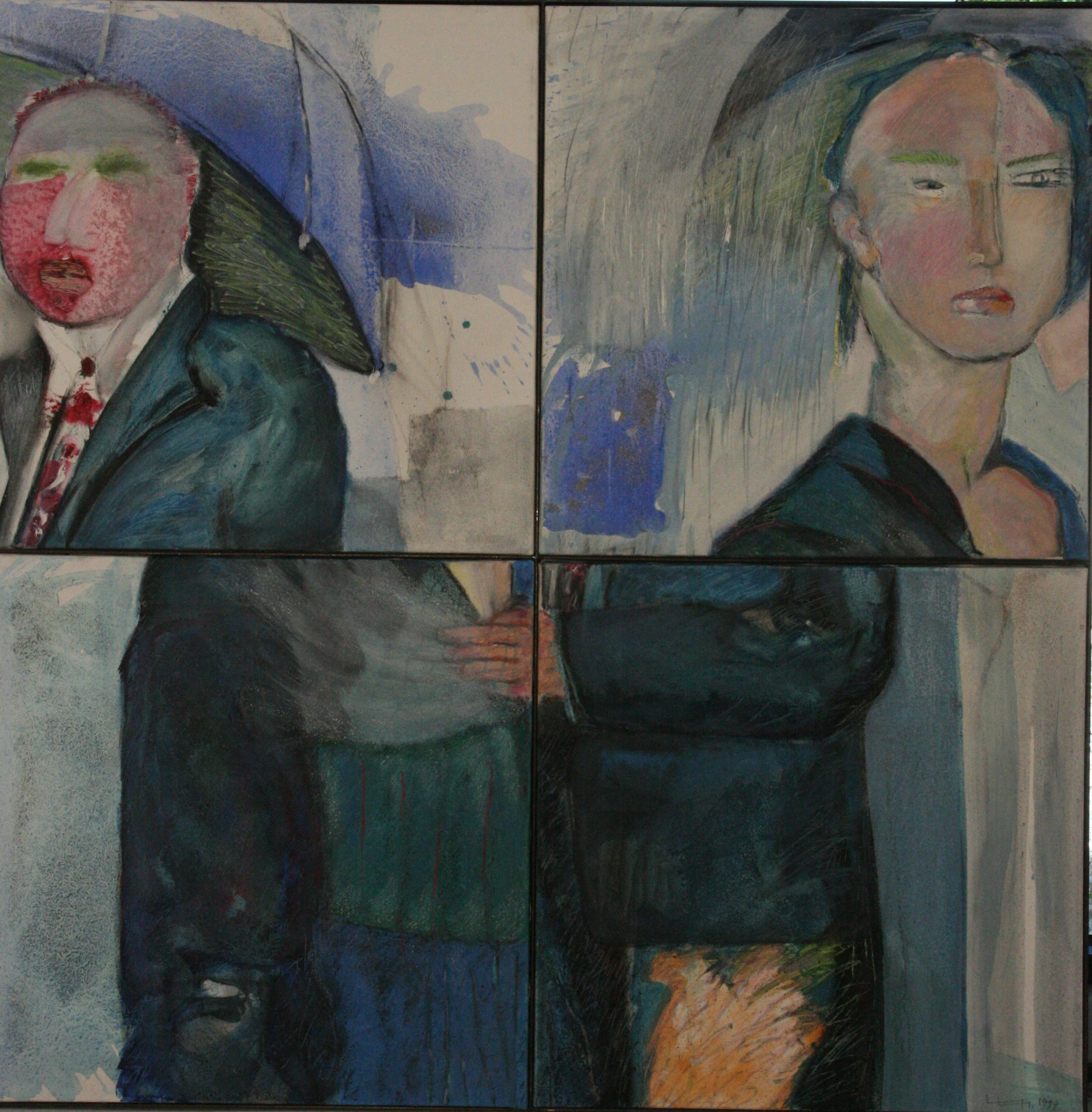
Leda Luss Luyken :ModulArt, The Couple, modulation 4.

=== Co-creativity ===
A school of thought coming out of the United States emphasizes modular art's alignment with the post-industrial character of 21st century culture and its contrast with traditional notions of art. Core characteristics of post-industrialism, as largely defined by the theorist Daniel Bell in his 1973 book The Coming of Post-Industrial Society, include the emergence of a service economy in place of a manufacturing one; the social and economic pre-eminence of the creative, professional and technical classes; the central place of theoretical knowledge as a font of innovation; the strong influence of technology on daily life; and high levels of urbanization.

Modular art appears to synchronize perfectly with several of these criteria. For example, its manual changeability opens up the possibility of co-creative art, in which the collector or user collaborates with the originating modular artist to jointly determine the appearance of the work of art. This presupposes the existence of creative people capable of and interested in serving such a role – a demographic evolution that was already underway in Bell's time and that has since been studied in works like Richard Florida's Rise of the Creative Class (2002).

Co-creation is closely associated with mass customization, a production model that combines the opportunity for individual personalization with mass production. Modular art and mass customization share a commonality in their synthesis of two opposing qualities. On the one hand, as previously stated the very concept of modularity implies a limitless supply of identical modules such as only industrial production can provide; on the other hand, the ability of the individual to re-arrange these modules in the work of art based on aesthetic criteria re-injects a subjective and purely human dimension into the creative act.

Mass customization is itself only made possible with the advent of computers and a type of software known as a configurator. A configurator is a software tool used by the buyer to configure a product from the options made available by the vendor. Applied to the purpose of composing a work of modular art onscreen, it can greatly facilitate the design of a modular assembly by allowing the user to study multiple design options more quickly and in far greater depth than by using analog methods. Once the design is established a computer file is then sent over the air to a manufacturing facility where robotically controlled equipment produces the object according to its specifications. Not only does this computer-aided manufacturing (CAM) allow for the customization of mass-produced objects, it also enables a much higher level of precision and fit – qualities critical for modules to be physically joined together. Bell's identification of technology as a central axis of post-industrial life is underscored in the intertwining of the digital with the physical realization of modular art.

=== The de- and re-constructive approach in Europe ===
In Europe, where the 1960s Minimalist school of modular art was often seen as a principally American phenomenon, the discussion of modularity often focuses on its changeability. For example, the mutability of art is a core principle of Arte Povera, a contemporaneous movement that emerged in Italy which holds that works of art "should not be seen as fixed entities", but as objects of change and movement to "include time and space in a new manner. At stake is the issue of transferring the phenomenology of human experience" into the arts.

More recently, the artist Leda Luss Luyken has produced modular paintings, composed of movable painted panels set in steel frames. Luss Luyken has dubbed her work "ModulArt". In her work, changing the configuration of a modular painting constitutes a form of motion, offering the spectator alternative views and alternative interpretations, and thus aligning the work more closely than a static object to the dynamism of physical human experience. Art historian and theorist Denys Zacharopoulos called this "a new way of motion in painting". The concept of modular art allows the user to de-compose and to re-compose a work of art that is already completed by re-arranging its parts, thus providing numerous possibilities for ever newer pictures not yet imagined. The original painting can be re-contextualized ad libitum and ad infinitum.

== Modular artists and their work ==
=== Visual artists ===
Working in the 1950-60s in Manchester (UK), American artist Mitzi Cunliffe developed sculptures consisting of multiple blocks about twelve inches square which she put together in a variety of combinations to give a sculptured effect on a large scale. She referred to them as modular sculptures. The University of Manchester and the University of Manchester Institute of Science and Technology (UMIST) acquired some of these works, although there are no references to them in published accounts of her work.

Sculptor and ceramicist Malcolm Leland designed in 1954 a similar modular sculpture system based on a single 23-inch tall module that could be stacked vertically by means of a centering pin; the module has a generally biomorphic, curvilinear outline that yields an undulating silhouette when multiple modules are placed on top of each other. The technique of stacking repetitive elements in the round recalls Constantin Brâncuși's "Endless Column" of 1938.

Starting in the 1970s, Leland's contemporary Norman Carlberg produced groups of square framed prints which he placed together on a wall in a tight grid, each print conceived as an independent module. The viewer is then invited to rotate or reposition them to generate new composite images. The abstract quality of the prints enhanced the creative possibilities of their re-orientation insofar as they are non-directional and geometrically inter-related.

Greek-born conceptual artist Leda Luss Luyken, who was initially trained as an architect, has been exploring modularity in the medium of painting since the 1990s. In her work standardized canvas panels are mounted as modules onto a steel frame within which they can be moved and rotated.

In the U.S. Moshé Elimelech created what he has called "Cubic Constructions". These are multiple groupings of approximately three-inch cubes set inside pockets in a framed shadow box. On each cube he applies paint in fields of bright color and abstract pattern with precise, controlled brush strokes. Like Carlsberg, Elimelech then invites the viewer to reposition any or all of the cubes to display one of their six sides, each of which is painted in a different pattern. Exhibiting since the 1980s, Elimelech shows primarily in California galleries, and has work represented in several museum design stores as well.

Another portfolio of interactive modular art comes out of Studio for A.R.T. and Architecture, a New York-based firm headed by Donald Rattner. Rattner has designed modular art in the media of wall sculpture, rotational paintings, tapestries, artist's wallpapers and artist's books. To bring his work and those of other "modulartists" to the marketplace, Rattner founded A.R.T. (art-rethought), an art storefront focused on co-creative and modular work. In his writings Rattner has emphasized the post-industrial aspect of the most recent trends in modular art, coining the term "New Industrialism" to denote mass customization, production on demand, open innovation, co-creative design, tele-fabrication, robotics and other computer-driven technologies that are re-defining how things are made in the global marketplace.

=== Composers ===
Modularity in music can be seen as bringing two key elements of musical composition and film into the world of painting: variation of a theme and movement of and within a picture. For this very reason the contemporary composer Minas Borboudakis has dedicated the third part of his trilogy ROAI III for piano and electronics to the modular methodology.

Italian composer and arts theoretician Stefano Vagnini has developed a theory of open-source composition based on modular aggregation. The concept of a musical work of art being something closed, limited and immobile disappears in favor of a process of numerous aggregations that allow a composition to become infinite in principle. Several such compositions were performed in Europe, South America, Asia and in North America and discussed through conferences in Europe. The approach is being academically discussed at the University of West Georgia and the Carrollton Cultural Arts Centre in the USA. Writer, painter, and art theorist Gian Ruggero Manzoni described the modularity of Vagnini's compositions as "circular like the existence, his works are not finished, but merely stimulus for new voices".

== Related art movements ==
- Conceptual art
- Generative art
- Minimalism
- Serial art
- Systems art

== Films ==
- Panta rei, Leda Luss-Luyken's ModulArt, by Dagmar Scheibert & Reinhard Eisener, 3'30" film, 15', Berlin, 2005.
- ModulArt, by Roman Angelos Luyken, 2', London, 2008.
- Leda Luss Luyken: ModulArt, TV Feature by Peider Defilla for BRα - ARD TV, Munich, 15', 2011.

== Literature ==
- Leda Luss Luyken :ModulArt, ed. by Georg von Kap-herr, with contributions by Prof. Paul Schilfgaarde and Dr. Joachim Kaske, English and German, 112 p, Bobingen, 2008.
- The Modular Method in Music, by Stefano Vagnini, English and Italian, 161 pp, Rome: Falcon Valley Music, 2002.
