= Mitzi Cunliffe =

American sculptor (1918–2006)

- Mitzi Cunliffe with designs and a version of the BAFTA mask (credit: Estate of the artist).
- Born: Mitzi Solomon; January 1, 1918; New York City, US
- Died: December 30, 2006 (aged 88); Oxford, United Kingdom
- Known for: Sculpture
- Spouse: Marcus Cunliffe (m. 1949–1971)

Mitzi Solomon Cunliffe (January 1, 1918 – December 30, 2006) was an American sculptor. She was most famous for designing the golden trophy in the shape of a theatrical mask that would go on to represent the British Academy of Film and Television Arts and be presented as the BAFTA Award. She also produced textiles, ceramics, and jewellery.

== Early life ==
Cunliffe was born Mitzi Solomon in New York City. She attended the Art Students League of New York from 1930 to 1933 and read Fine Arts and Fine Arts Education at Columbia University from 1935 to 1940, receiving a BSc in 1939 and an MA in 1940.

Upon graduation, she moved to Paris, where she studied at the Académie Colarossi for a year. After viewing the western side of Cathedral of Chartres, she settled on becoming an architectural sculptor. Following this she studied for a period in Sweden. Her early works, of free-standing figures, were admired by Le Corbusier. She was awarded the 1949 Widener Gold Medal by the Pennsylvania Academy of Fine Arts for A Voluptuous Object.

Cunliffe, then Solomon, was one of the sculptors who exhibited at the 3rd Sculpture International in Philadelphia in 1949. She is one of the sculptors identified in the 70 Sculptors photograph taken at that event. Also in 1949, she met and married British academic Marcus Cunliffe, who later became known for his books about American history and literature. He was a lecturer at Manchester University, and she moved with him to Didsbury. They had a son and two daughters (one of whom is Shay Cunliffe, CDG Award-winning costume designer). They were divorced in 1971.

== Works ==
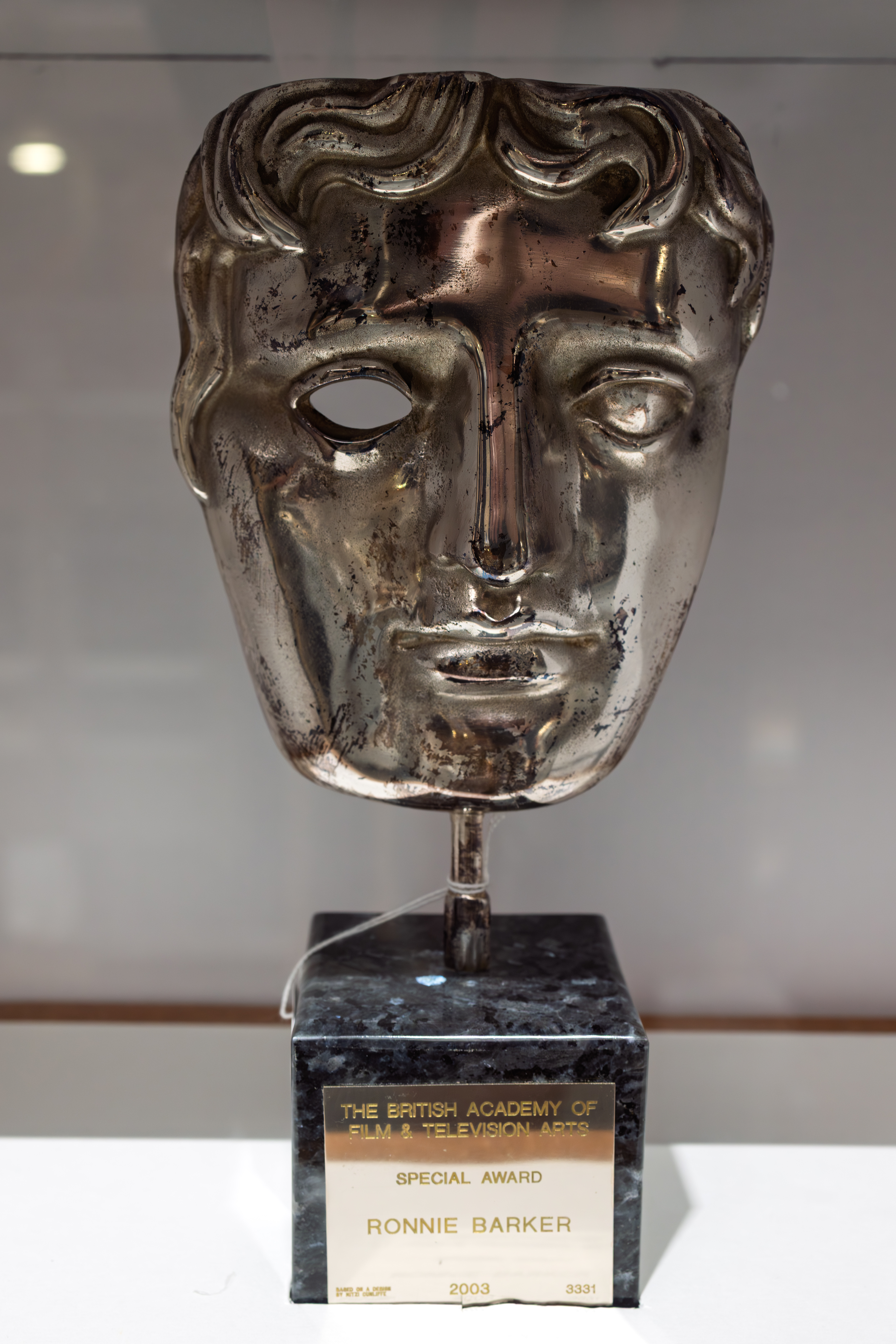
BAFTA trophy (a special lifetime achievement award presented to Ronnie Barker)

As early as 1944, Mitzi had created the first of two marble sculptures — a 32-inch-high (810 mm) winged female figure in red Spanish marble entitled "harp-form" — under commission from Henry Dreyfuss, noted industrial designer, for a new fleet of ships called "4 Aces" for American Export Lines.

Her first large scale commission was two pieces for the Festival of Britain in 1951. One, known as Root Bodied Forth, shows figures emerging from a tree, and was displayed at the entrance of the Festival. The second, a pair of bronze handles in the form of hands, adorned the Regatta Restaurant. She created a similar piece, in the form of knots, in 1952 which remains at the School of Civic Design at Liverpool University.

Heaton Park pumping station was built in 1955, for which Cunliffe was commissioned to design and craft a relief panel which depicts the water being brought from Haweswater to Manchester. It has been described as "a remarkable piece of public art on ... a mundane industrial building". The building was listed in 1998 as a "complete work of art", the only such listing for any building built after 1945. That year, she was also commissioned to create the BAFTA mask for the Guild of Television Producers and Directors (which merged with the British Film Academy in 1958 to form the Society of Film and Television Arts, renamed the British Academy of Film and Television Arts in 1976).

She created a large pierced screen for the restaurant at Lewis's department store in Liverpool in 1957. She bought the piece when the Restaurant closed in 1986, and moved it to her home at Seillans in the south of France. She designed textiles for David Whitehead and Tootal Broadhurst, and ceramics for Pilkington.

In the 1950-60s Mitzi Cunliffe developed in Manchester sculptures consisting of multiple blocks about twelve square inches (75 cm^{2}) which she put together in a variety of combinations to give a sculptured effect on a large scale. She referred to them as modular sculptures. Some of these works were acquired by the University of Manchester and the University of Manchester Institute of Science and Technology (UMIST). In the same studio at 18 Cranmer Road, Greek artist Leda Luss Luyken explored a similar principle of variable modularity in the arts in her ModulArt paintings of the 1980s.

Cunliffe developed a technique for mass-producing abstract designs in relief in concrete, as architectural decoration, which she described as "sculpture by the yard". She used the technique to decorate buildings throughout the UK, but particularly in and around Manchester. One example is a relief panel set high up on the external wall on the 1967–68 modern extension of Altrincham General Hospital on Market Street. Her last major architectural commission was the creation of four carved stone panels for Scottish Life House on Cheapside in the City of London in 1970.

== Later life and death ==
Cunliffe suffered from arthritis and eye problems in later life. She gave up sculpture to teach at Thames Polytechnic (which later became London South Bank University) from 1971 to 1976, and then at the Institute for Architecture and Urban Studies and the Cooper-Hewitt National Design Museum in New York, the University of Pennsylvania, and Concordia University in Montreal, Quebec, Canada.

She later developed Alzheimer's disease, and retired to Oxford, but she remained in the public eye. Her designs were included in an exhibition of Public Sculpture held in Leeds at the Henry Moore Institute in the autumn of 1999. Her final exhibition took place in Oxford in 2001, where her work was included with that of other artists suffering from Alzheimer's. Her daughter Antonia named an annual prize (1994 to 2007) in her honour and presented to an exemplary presentation by a student in any media at the Ruskin School of Art of Oxford University.

She died at her nursing home in Oxfordshire, two days before her 89th birthday. She was survived by her three children.
