= Modularity =

Degree to which a system's components may be separated and recombined

Modularity is the degree to which a system's components may be separated and recombined, often with the benefit of flexibility and variety in use. The concept of modularity is used primarily to reduce complexity by breaking a system into varying degrees of interdependence and independence across and "hide the complexity of each part behind an abstraction and interface". However, the concept of modularity can be extended to multiple disciplines, each with their own nuances. Despite these nuances, consistent themes concerning modular systems can be identified.

Composability is one of the tenets of functional programming. This makes functional programs modular.

== Contextual nuances ==
The meaning of the word "modularity" can vary somewhat based on context. The following are contextual examples of modularity across several fields of science, technology, industry, and culture:

=== Science ===
- In biology, modularity recognizes that organisms or metabolic pathways are composed of modules.
- In ecology, modularity is considered a key factor—along with diversity and feedback—in supporting resilience.
- In nature, modularity may refer to the construction of a cellular organism by joining together standardized units to form larger compositions, as for example, the hexagonal cells in a honeycomb.
- In cognitive science, the idea of modularity of mind holds that the mind is composed of independent, closed, domain-specific processing modules.
  - Visual modularity, the various putative visual modules.
  - Language module, the putative language module.
- In the study of complex networks, modularity is a benefit function that measures the quality of a division of a network into groups or communities.

=== Technology ===
- In modular programming, modularity refers to the compartmentalization and interrelation of the parts of a software package.
- In software design, modularity refers to a logical partitioning of the "software design" that allows complex software to be manageable for the purpose of implementation and maintenance. The logic of partitioning may be based on related functions, implementation considerations, data links, or other criteria.
- In self-reconfiguring modular robotics, modularity refers to the ability of the robotic system to automatically achieve different morphologies to execute the task at hand.

=== Industry ===
- In modular construction, modules are a bundle of redundant project components that are produced en masse prior to installation. Building components are often arranged into modules in the industrialization of construction.
- In industrial design, modularity refers to an engineering technique that builds larger systems by combining smaller subsystems.
- In manufacturing, modularity typically refers to modular design, either as the use of exchangeable parts or options in the fabrication of an object or the design and manufacture of modular components.
- In organizational design, Richard L. Daft and Arie Y. Lewin (1993) identified a paradigm called "modular organization" that had as its ground the need for flexible learning organizations in constant change and the need to solve their problems through coordinated self-organizing processes. This modular organization is characterized by decentralized decision-making, flatter hierarchies, self-organization of units.

=== Culture ===
- In The Language of New Media, author Lev Manovich discusses the principle that new media is composed of modules or self-sufficient parts of the overall media object.
- In contemporary art and architecture, modularity can refer to the construction of an object by joining together standardized units to form larger compositions, and/or to the use of a module as a standardized unit of measurement and proportion.
- In modular art, modularity refers to the ability to alter the work by reconfiguring, adding to, and/or removing its parts.

== Modularity in different research areas ==
=== Modularity in technology and management ===
The term modularity is widely used in studies of technological and organizational systems. Product systems are deemed "modular", for example, when they can be decomposed into a number of components that may be mixed and matched in a variety of configurations. The components are able to connect, interact, or exchange resources (such as energy or data) in some way, by adhering to a standardized interface. Unlike a tightly integrated product whereby each component is designed to work specifically (and often exclusively) with other particular components in a tightly coupled system, modular products are systems of components that are "loosely coupled."

In The Language of New Media, Lev Manovich proposes five "principles of new media"—to be understood "not as absolute laws but rather as general tendencies of a culture undergoing computerization." The five principles are numerical representation, modularity, automation, variability, and transcoding. Modularity within new media represents new media as being composed of several separate self-sufficient modules that can act independently or together in synchronisation to complete the new media object. In Photoshop, modularity is most evident in layers; a single image can be composed of many layers, each of which can be treated as an entirely independent and separate entity. Websites can be defined as being modular, their structure is formed in a format that allows their contents to be changed, removed or edited whilst still retaining the structure of the website. This is because the website's content operates separately to the website and does not define the structure of the site. The entire Web, Manovich notes, has a modular structure, composed of independent sites and pages, and each webpage itself is composed of elements and code that can be independently modified.

Organizational systems are said to become increasingly modular when they begin to substitute loosely coupled forms for tightly integrated, hierarchical structures. For instance, when the firm utilizes contract manufacturing rather than in-house manufacturing, it is using an organizational component that is more independent than building such capabilities in-house: the firm can switch between contract manufacturers that perform different functions, and the contract manufacturer can similarly work for different firms. As firms in a given industry begin to substitute loose coupling with organizational components that lie outside of firm boundaries for activities that were once conducted in-house, the entire production system (which may encompass many firms) becomes increasingly modular. The firms themselves become more specialized components. Using loosely coupled structures enables firms to achieve greater flexibility in both scope and scale. This is in line with modularity in the processes of production, which relates to the way that technological artifacts are produced. This consists of the artifact's entire value chain, from the designing of the artifact to the manufacturing and distribution stages. In production, modularity is often due to increased design modularity. The firm can switch easily between different providers of these activities (e.g., between different contract manufacturers or alliance partners) compared to building the capabilities for all activities in house, thus responding to different market needs more quickly. However, these flexibility gains come with a price. Therefore, the organization must assess the flexibility gains achievable, and any accompanying loss of performance, with each of these forms.

Modularization within firms leads to the disaggregation of the traditional form of hierarchical governance. The firm is decomposed into relatively small autonomous organizational units (modules) to reduce complexity. Modularization leads to a structure, in which the modules integrate strongly interdependent tasks, while the interdependencies between the modules are weak. In this connection the dissemination of modular organizational forms has been facilitated by the widespread efforts of the majority of large firms to re-engineer, refocus and restructure. These efforts usually involve a strong process-orientation: the complete service-provision process of the business is split up into partial processes, which can then be handled autonomously by cross-functional teams within organizational units (modules). The co-ordination of the modules is often carried out by using internal market mechanisms, in particular by the implementation of profit centers. Overall, modularization enables more flexible and quicker reaction to changing general or market conditions. Building on the above principles, many alternative forms of modularization of organizations (for-profit or non-profit) are possible. However, modularization is not an independent and self-contained organizational concept, but rather consists of several basic ideas, which are integral parts of other organizational concepts. These central ideas can be found in every firm. Accordingly, it is not sensible to characterize a firm as "modular" or as "not modular", because firms are always modular to some degree.

The accounts above largely assume a proprietary setting, in which modularity serves to manage scarce resources and to outsource production. Kosmas Gavras and Vasilis Kostakis argue that open-source hardware inverts several of these premises: contributors self-select tasks, the copying of technical knowledge is encouraged rather than restricted, and economies of scale sit uneasily with localised manufacturing. Extending the distinction between modularity in artifact design, in production processes and in use, they propose a five-part typology comprising design modularity (which may rest on physical modules or on intangible ones, such as reusable blocks of parametric design code), fabrication modularity, hardware modularity, macro-modularity across a project ecosystem, and community modularity among contributors. They identify intangible design, fabrication and macro-modularity as particular to the open-source context, where the aim is not to outsource component production but to allow designs to be adapted to whatever tools and materials are locally available.

Quantifying these types with a network-based modularity index rather than the design structure matrix methods common in product design research, Gavras and Kostakis found no consistent correspondence between the modularity of an artifact and that of the community producing it: in both of their cases the relationship was inverse, with a loosely structured design emerging from a small or single-person team. On this basis they argue that the "mirroring hypothesis", which holds that product architecture and organizational architecture are dual in structure, is not a universal pattern outside software. They further distinguish ex ante from ex post modularisation, noting that modules imposed after a design is complete may register as highly modular yet remain difficult for others to reuse, whereas bottom-up modularisation yields components more readily recombined across projects—a contrast they liken to the cathedral and the bazaar.

Input systems, or "domain specific computational mechanisms" (such as the ability to perceive spoken language) are termed vertical faculties, and according to Jerry Fodor they are modular in that they possess a number of characteristics Fodor argues constitute modularity. Fodor's list of features characterizing modules includes the following:

1. Domain specific (modules only respond to inputs of a specific class, and thus a "species of vertical faculty" (Fodor, 1996 [1983]:37)
2. Innately specified (the structure is inherent and is not formed by a learning process)
3. Not assembled (modules are not put together from a stock of more elementary subprocesses but rather their virtual architecture maps directly onto their neural implementation)
4. Neurologically hardwired (modules are associated with specific, localized, and elaborately structured neural systems rather than fungible neural mechanisms)
5. Autonomous (modules independent of other modules)

Fodor does not argue that this is formal definition or an all-inclusive list of features necessary for modularity. He argues only that cognitive systems characterized by some of the features above are likely to be characterized by them all, and that such systems can be considered modular. He also notes that the characteristics are not an all-or-nothing proposition, but rather each of the characteristics may be manifest in some degree, and that modularity itself is also not a dichotomous construct—something may be more or less modular: "One would thus expect—what anyhow seems to be desirable—that the notion of modularity ought to admit of degrees" (Fodor, 1996 [1983]:37).

Notably, Fodor's "not assembled" feature contrasts sharply with the use of modularity in other fields in which modular systems are seen to be hierarchically nested (that is, modules are themselves composed of modules, which in turn are composed of modules, etc.) However, Max Coltheart notes that Fodor's commitment to the non-assembled feature appears weak, and other scholars (e.g., Block) have proposed that Fodor's modules could be decomposed into finer modules. For instance, while Fodor distinguishes between separate modules for spoken and written language, Block might further decompose the spoken language module into modules for phonetic analysis and lexical forms: "Decomposition stops when all the components are primitive processors—because the operation of a primitive processor cannot be further decomposed into suboperations"

Though Fodor's work on modularity is one of the most extensive, there is other work in psychology on modularity worth noting for its symmetry with modularity in other disciplines. For instance, while Fodor focused on cognitive input systems as modules, Coltheart proposes that there may be many different kinds of cognitive modules, and distinguishes between, for example, knowledge modules and processing modules. The former is a body of knowledge that is independent of other bodies of knowledge, while the latter is a mental information-processing system independent from other such systems.

However, the data neuroscientists have accumulated have not pointed to an organization system as neat and precise as the modularity theory originally proposed originally by Jerry Fodor. It has been shown to be much messier and different from person to person, even though general patterns exist; through a mixture of neuroimaging and lesion studies, it has been shown that there are certain regions that perform certain functions and other regions that do not perform those functions.

=== Modularity in biology ===
As in some of the other disciplines, the term modularity may be used in multiple ways in biology. For example, it may refer to organisms that have an indeterminate structure wherein modules of various complexity (e.g., leaves, twigs) may be assembled without strict limits on their number or placement. Many plants and sessile (immobile) invertebrates of the benthic zones demonstrate this type of modularity (by contrast, many other organisms have a determinate structure that is predefined in embryogenesis). The term has also been used in a broader sense in biology to refer to the reuse of homologous structures across individuals and species. Even within this latter category, there may be differences in how a module is perceived. For instance, evolutionary biologists may focus on the module as a morphological component (subunit) of a whole organism, while developmental biologists may use the term module to refer to some combination of lower-level components (e.g., genes) that are able to act in a unified way to perform a function. In the former, the module is perceived a basic component, while in the latter the emphasis is on the module as a collective.

Biology scholars have provided a list of features that should characterize a module (much as Fodor did in The Modularity of Mind). For instance, Rudy Raff provides the following list of characteristics that developmental modules should possess:

1. discrete genetic specification
2. hierarchical organization
3. interactions with other modules
4. a particular physical location within a developing organism
5. the ability to undergo transformations on both developmental and evolutionary time scales

To Raff's mind, developmental modules are "dynamic entities representing localized processes (as in morphogenetic fields) rather than simply incipient structures ... (... such as organ rudiments)". Bolker, however, attempts to construct a definitional list of characteristics that is more abstract, and thus more suited to multiple levels of study in biology. She argues that:

1. A module is a biological entity (a structure, a process, or a pathway) characterized by more internal than external integration
2. Modules are biological individuals that can be delineated from their surroundings or context, and whose behavior or function reflects the integration of their parts, not simply the arithmetical sum. That is, as a whole, the module can perform tasks that its constituent parts could not perform if dissociated.
3. In addition to their internal integration, modules have external connectivity, yet they can also be delineated from the other entities with which they interact in some way.

Another stream of research on modularity in biology that should be of particular interest to scholars in other disciplines is that of Günter Wagner and Lee Altenberg. Altenberg's work, Wagner's work, and their joint writing explores how natural selection may have resulted in modular organisms, and the roles modularity plays in evolution. Altenberg's and Wagner's work suggests that modularity is both the result of evolution, and facilitates evolution—an idea that shares a marked resemblance to work on modularity in technological and organizational domains.

=== Modularity in the arts ===
The use of modules in the fine arts has a long pedigree among diverse cultures. In the classical architecture of Greco-Roman antiquity, the module was utilized as a standardized unit of measurement for proportioning the elements of a building. Typically the module was established as one-half the diameter of the lower shaft of a classical column; all the other components in the syntax of the classical system were expressed as a fraction or multiple of that module. In traditional Japanese construction, room sizes were often determined by combinations of standard rice mats called tatami; the standard dimension of a mat was around 3 feet by 6 feet, which approximate the overall proportions of a reclining human figure. The module thus becomes not only a proportional device for use with three-dimensional vertical elements but a two-dimensional planning tool as well.

Modularity as a means of measurement is intrinsic to certain types of building; for example, brick construction is by its nature modular insofar as the fixed dimensions of a brick necessarily yield dimensions that are multiples of the original unit. Attaching bricks to one another to form walls and surfaces also reflects a second definition of modularity: namely, the use of standardized units that physically connect to each other to form larger compositions.

With the advent of modernism and advanced construction techniques in the 20th century this latter definition transforms modularity from a compositional attribute to a thematic concern in its own right. A school of modular constructivism develops in the 1950s among a circle of sculptors who create sculpture and architectural features out of repetitive units cast in concrete. A decade later modularity becomes an autonomous artistic concern of its own, as several important Minimalist artists adopt it as their central theme. Modular building as both an industrial production model and an object of advanced architectural investigation develops from this same period.

Modularity has found renewed interest among proponents of ModulArt, a form of modular art in which the constituent parts can be physically reconfigured, removed and/or added to. After a few isolated experiments in ModulArt starting in the 1950s, several artists since the 1990s have explored this flexible, customizable and co-creative form of art.

=== Modularity in fashion ===
Modularity in fashion is the ability to customise garments through adding and removing elements or altering the silhouette, usually via zips, hook and eye closures or other fastenings. Throughout history it has been used to tailor garments, existing even in the 17th century. In recent years, an increasing number of fashion designers – especially those focused on slow or sustainable fashion – are experimenting with this concept. Within the realm of Haute Couture, Yohji Yamamoto and Hussein Chalayan are notable examples, the latter especially for his use of technology to create modular garments.

Studies carried out in Finland and the US show favourable attitudes of consumers to modular fashion, despite this the concept has not yet made it into mainstream fashion. The current emphasis within modular fashion is on the co-designing and customisation factors for consumers, with a goal to combat the swift changes to customers needs and wants, while also tackling sustainability by increasing the life-cycle of garments.

=== Modularity in product design ===
Modularity is a concept that has been thoroughly used in architecture and industry. In interior design modularity is used in order to achieve customizable products that are economically viable. Examples include some of the customizable creations of IKEA and mostly high-end high-cost concepts. Modularity in interior design, or "modularity in use", refers to the opportunities of combinations and reconfigurations of the modules in order to create an artefact that suits the specific needs of the user and simultaneously grows with them. The evolution of 3D printing technology has enabled customizable furniture to become feasible. Objects can be prototyped, changed depending on the space and customized dependent on the users needs. Designers can prototype showcase their modules over the internet just by using 3D printing technology. Sofas are a common piece that have modular utilities ranging from ottoman to a bed, as well as fabrics and textiles that are swappable. This originated in the 1940s after being invented by Harvey Probber, was refined in the 1970s, and reaching mass scale consumerism in the 2010s and 2020s.

=== Modularity in American studies ===
In John Blair's Modular America, he argues that as Americans began to replace social structures inherited from Europe (predominantly England and France), they evolved a uniquely American tendency towards modularity in fields as diverse as education, music, and architecture.

Blair observes that when the word module first emerged in the sixteenth and seventeenth centuries, it meant something very close to model. It implied a small-scale representation or example. By the eighteenth and nineteenth centuries, the word had come to imply a standard measure of fixed ratios and proportions. For example, in architecture, the proportions of a column could be stated in modules (i.e., "a height of fourteen modules equaled seven times the diameter measured at the base") and thus multiplied to any size while still retaining the desired proportions.

However, in America, the meaning and usage of the word shifted considerably: "Starting with architectural terminology in the 1930s, the new emphasis was on any entity or system designed in terms of modules as subcomponents. As applications broadened after World War II to furniture, hi-fi equipment, computer programs and beyond, modular construction came to refer to any whole made up of self-contained units designed to be equivalent parts of a system, hence, we might say, "systemically equivalent." Modular parts are implicitly interchangeable and/or recombinable in one or another of several senses".

Blair defines a modular system as "one that gives more importance to parts than to wholes. Parts are conceived as equivalent and hence, in one or more senses, interchangeable and/or cumulative and/or recombinable" (p. 125). Blair describes the emergence of modular structures in education (the college curriculum), industry (modular product assembly), architecture (skyscrapers), music (blues and jazz), and more. In his concluding chapter, Blair does not commit to a firm view of what causes Americans to pursue more modular structures in the diverse domains in which it has appeared; but he does suggest that it may in some way be related to the American ideology of liberal individualism and a preference for anti-hierarchical organization.

== Consistent themes ==
Comparing the use of modularity across disciplines reveals several themes:

One theme that shows up in psychology and biology study is innately specified. Innately specified (as used here) implies that the purpose or structure of the module is predetermined by some biological mandate.

Domain specificity, that modules respond only to inputs of a specific class (or perform functions only of a specific class) is a theme that clearly spans psychology and biology, and it can be argued that it also spans technological and organizational systems. Domain specificity would be seen in the latter disciplines as specialization of function.

Hierarchically nested is a theme that recurs in most disciplines. Though originally disavowed by Jerry Fodor, other psychologists have embraced it, and it is readily apparent in the use of modularity in biology (e.g., each module of an organism can be decomposed into finer modules), social processes and artifacts (e.g., we can think of a skyscraper in terms of blocks of floors, a single floor, elements of a floor, etc.), mathematics (e.g., the modulus 6 may be further divided into the moduli 1, 2 and 3), and technological and organizational systems (e.g., an organization may be composed of divisions, which are composed of teams, which are composed of individuals).

Greater internal than external integration is a theme that showed up in every discipline but mathematics. Often referred to as autonomy, this theme acknowledged that there may be interaction or integration between modules, but the greater interaction and integration occurs within the module. This theme is very closely related to information encapsulation, which shows up explicitly in both the psychology and technology research.

Near decomposability (as termed by Simon, 1962) shows up in all of the disciplines, but is manifest in a matter of degrees. For instance, in psychology and biology it may refer merely to the ability to delineate one module from another (recognizing the boundaries of the module). In several of the social artifacts, mathematics, and technological or organizational systems, however, it refers to the ability to actually separate components from one another. In several of the disciplines this decomposability also enables the complexity of a system (or process) to be reduced. This is aptly captured in a quote from David Marr about psychological processes where he notes that, "any large computation should be split up into a collection of small, nearly independent, specialized subprocesses." Reducing complexity is also the express purpose of casting out nines in mathematics.

Substitutability and recombinability are closely related constructs. The former refers to the ability to substitute one component for another as in John Blair's "systemic equivalence" while the latter may refer both to the indeterminate form of the system and the indeterminate use of the component. In US college curricula, for example, each course is designed with a credit system that ensures a uniform number of contact hours, and approximately uniform educational content, yielding substitutability. By virtue of their substitutability, each student may create their own curricula (recombinability of the curriculum as a system) and each course may be said to be recombinable with a variety of students' curricula (recombinability of the component within multiple systems). Both substitutability and recombinability are immediately recognizable in Blair's social processes and artifacts, and are also well captured in Garud and Kumaraswamy's discussion of economies of substitution in technological systems.

Blair's systemic equivalence also demonstrates the relationship between substitutability and the module as a homologue. Blair's systemic equivalence refers to the ability for multiple modules to perform approximately the same function within a system, while in biology a module as a homologue refers to different modules sharing approximately the same form or function in different organisms. The extreme of the module as homologue is found in mathematics, where (in the simplest case) the modules refer to the reuse of a particular number and thus each module is exactly alike.

In all but mathematics, there has been an emphasis that modules may be different in kind. In Fodor's discussion of modular cognitive system, each module performs a unique task. In biology, even modules that are considered homologous may be somewhat different in form and function (e.g., a whale's fin versus a human's hand). In Blair's book, he points out that while jazz music may be composed of structural units that conform to the same underlying rules, those components vary significantly. Similarly in studies of technology and organization, modular systems may be composed of modules that are very similar (as in shelving units that may be piled one atop the other) or very different (as in a stereo system where each component performs unique functions) or any combination in between.

Table 1: The use of modularity by discipline
Concept	Technology and organizations	Psychology	Biology	American studies	Mathematics
Domain specific	X	X	X		
Innately specified		X	X		
Hierarchically nested	X	X	X	X	X
More internal integration than external integration (localized processes and autonomy)	X	X	X	X	
Informationally encapsulated	X	X			
Near decomposability	X	X	X	X	X
Recombinability	X		X	X	X
Expandability	X		X	X	X
Module as homologue	X		X	X	X

== See also ==
- Configuration design
- Object-oriented programming
- Pattern language
