= Root Bodied Forth =

1951 sculpture in London by Mitzi Cunliffe

- Artist: Mitzi Cunliffe
- Year: 1951
- Medium: Concrete
- Dimensions: 240 cm (8 ft)
- Location: London, United Kingdom

Root Bodied Forth is an 8-ft.-tall concrete figurative sculpture by Mitzi Cunliffe for the Festival of Britain in 1951. The sculpture of an entwined couple growing as if they are trees was featured at the entrance of the South Bank exhibition. The final installation was made of terracota concrete and is thought to have been a dusky pink colour. The exhibition had the theme of people and land which inspired Cunliffe's work. Of the piece, she said:

It represents Man at one with Nature. It is man, woman and a growing thing. I want it to be all growing things, not just a particular tree, and therefore it may not look like a tree at all.

— Mitzi Cunliffe

Cunliffe's work was exhibited alongside that of Daphne Hardy Henrion, Karel Vogel and Peter Laszlo Peri. However, 50% of the sculptures in the temporary exhibition are still missing and their fates unknown, including Cunliffe's sculpture.

Cunliffe created a maquette of the final sculpture in bronze which is part of the Leeds Sculpture Collection at the Henry Moore Institute.

== See also ==
- Festival of Britain
