= Stefano Vagnini =

Italian composer

Stefano Vagnini (2009)

Stefano Vagnini (born 1963) is an Italian musician, composer, researcher, poet and Modular Art theorist.

== Biography ==
Stefano Vagnini was born in Fano, Italy.

Vagnini studied organ, composition and electronic music at the “G. Rossini” conservatory in Italy and at the Georgia State University in Atlanta, USA. He graduated in organ, organ composition with Professor Armando Pierucci and in electronic music with Professor Eugenio Giordani from the Conservatorio Statale di Musica in Pesaro (Italy). He attended several prestigious Organ masterclasses with famous organists such as Monserrat Torrent, Michael Radulescu, Liuwe Tamminga, André Isoir, Sarah L. Martin.

Vagnini has taught organ and composition at the Conservatories in Verona and L'Aquila (Italy).

From 1986 to 2013 he has been Art Director of the International Organ Festival at Santa Maria Nuova in Fano, Italy, where internationally acclaimed organists performed, including Liuwe Tamminga, Michael Radulescu, Arturo Sacchetti, Gaston Litaize and Odile Pierre.

In 1997 he starts developing a new composing methodology, specifically applied to music, called ModulArt, which is today his main field of research.

Since 2003, together with soprano Giorgia Ragni, he forms a musical duo in art and in life called Aidaduo. Aidaduo researches, elaborates and creates new kind of concerts and Modular performances which are presented through seminars and conferences in Universities and cultural centers around the world.

== Works ==
Concerts as organist and choir director in Italy, U.S.A (’86,’08,’09,’10,’11,’12), Germany (’92,’93,’99,’06, ’12), Austria (’99), Switzerland (’99,’10), Russia (‘95), Brazil (’95,’98), Argentina (’95,’98), Uruguay (’95,’98), China (’98,’16,’17,’18), Spain (’05,’07) England (’11), Scotland (’12), Denmark (’12), Poland (’12,’14), Finland (’12), Holland (’12), South Korea (’13,’14,’15,’16,’17), Japan (’16,’17,’18), France (’89,’06,’12,’19 ).

Vagnini has conducted the Slave Song gospel choir and the Mezio Agostini opera choir in Fano, Italy.

=== Compositions and performances ===
Ballet

- Cappuccetto Rosso: Saint-Ouen-l’Aumône, performed in France and Fano (Italy)
- Le Fou de Notre Dame: choreographer Sylvie Roukhadze’
- Kroma

Theater

- Waiting for Godot: Transteatro Fano Production, director Massimo Puliani, Napoli and Roma (Italy)
- Thesys: director Fernando Scarpa, Wittenberg (Germany), 2002
- Luther Stories: director Fernando Scarpa, Wittenberg (Germany)

Video

- Incubi Catodici: director Renato Toniato (Italy) winning the following awards:
- Mirano Award: 1985, Mirano (Italy)
- The Linz Award: 1986, Linz (Austria)
- Concerto a Berlino: director Stefano Vagnini, Teatro della Fortuna, Fano (Italy)

Organ solo

- Meditazione
- Meditazione 2
- Preludio, Ricercare e Finale
- Luci
- Aenigma
- Aracne
- Les Danses Modulaires

Organ and tape

- Isola di Koch: performed in Pesaro (Italy), Auditorium Pedrotti, Fano, Santa Maria Nuova Church.

Orchestra

- Il Meraviglioso Segreto del Biondo (Part A): commissioned by il Teatro della Fortuna, Fano (Italy), art director Fabrizio Festa.
- Via Crucis (Stations of the Cross): modular oratory performed at:

Beijing Concert Hall (China), 1998, first sacred opera authorized by the Chinese Popular Authority;
Fano (Italy), Corte Malatestiana, 1998
Sao Paulo, Monasterio de Sao Bento, 1998
Montevideo, 1998
Buenos Aires, San Telmo Cathedral, 1998
Berlin, Kaiser Wilhelm Kirche, 2003
Salzburg (Austria), Dome, 1999
Lausanne (Switzerland), Cathedral, 1999
Potsdam (Germany), 1999
Biberach (Germany), 1999
Rastatt (Germany), 1999
Geislingen an der Steige (Germany), 1999
Warstein (Germany), 1999
Darmstadt (Germany), 2000
Tolentino (Italy), Saint Nicola Sanctuary
Fossano (Italy)
Cermenate (Italy)

== AiDADUO ==
AiDADUO Style is a combination of classical music (piano and soprano) incorporating literature, cinema and fine arts mixed with a constant innovative, experimental and ironic research.

AiDADUO Performance-shows

- Aenigma: performed in

Alessandria (Italy), 2004
Viareggio (Italy), 2005

- Il Viaggio Sospeso: performed in

Tolentino (Italy), Cappellone of San Nicola, 2005

- Back to Bach: performed in

Narbonne (France), 2006
Fabrezan (France), 2006
El Medano, Tenerife (Spain), 2007

- Ouroburos: performed in Fano (Italy), Santa Maria Nuova church, 2007
- Toccate, Voli e ricercari su Salve Regina: performed in Bologna (Italy), San Giacomo Maggiore Church, 2007
- Gabersuite: performed in Fano (Italy), in the “Testi e Tasti” Festival, 2009
- EatalianGrandpianofood: performed in Washington D.C. (USA), Italian Embassy, 2010
- Sacrariae: performed in

Rome (Italy), St Paul's Within the Walls Cathedral, 2010
Ligornetto (Switzerland), Cathedral, 2010
Milan (Italy), Santa Rita Sanctuary, 2010
Rochester (England), Cathedral, 2011

- Small Packages from Italy: performed in Carrollton, Georgia (USA), Carrollton Cultural Art Center, in November 2010
- Christmas Alio Modo: performed in Carrollton, Georgia (USA), Tanner Hospital Harmony for Healing, in December 2010
- Visions: performed in Carrollton, Georgia (USA), Carrollton Cultural Art Center, in January 2011
- The Gothic Dream: performed in Carrollton, Georgia (USA), University of West Georgia, in February 2011. Modular project comminssioned by the University of West Georgia
- The Zoo Modular project: performed at the West Georgia University, Carrollton, Georgia (USA), Masterclass, Music Department, January 2011
- Sweet Suite Life: performed at the West Georgia University, Carrollton, Georgia (USA), Masterclass, Music and Silent Movie, Music History class, Music Department, April 2011
- ModulArt in Poetry: performed at the West Georgia University, Carrollton, Georgia (USA), Masterclass, Creative writing class, English Department, February 2012
- Assembling Forests: performed at the West Georgia University, Carrollton, Georgia (USA), Masterclass, Theater class, Theater Department, February 2012
- FaceBach: performed at the Strathclyde University, Glasgow, Scotland. Masterclass on Bach's interpretation and combination of his works together with contemporary composers such as J. Cage, C. Berberian, K. Stockhausen, by Giorgia Ragni and Stefano Vagnini, June 2012.
- KosmodulArt: Mitocosmi and Slamodie Subliminali: San Francesco church, Fano Italy. Modular performance for piano (Stefano Vagnini), Soprano (Giorgia Ragni), Narrators (Marco Florio and Ardo Quaranta) and video. Produced by Stefano Vagnini and Giorgia Ragni. Narrators' script by Ardo Quaranta. August 2012.
- Sono Ergo Sum: performed at the S. Domenico Pinacoteque, Fano Italy. First Baroque, Contemporary and Modular Music Festival, July 2014.

Piano solo

- Il Punto G: Cagli Teatro Comunale (Italy), “Testi e Tasti” Festival
- Aspettando Godot + Not Film: Fano (Italy), “Testi e Tasti” Festival

=== ModulArt ===
ModulArt in a new composing methodology theorized and applied to music by Vagnini. The modular composition system extends its procedure to compositions licensed by the musician as completed works of art. To these compositions, new modules can be overlapped. The new modules can be added by the same author in a different moment or by different authors. Greek History University Professor Umberto Bultrighini describes "Vagnini's ability to satisfy old needs and combine them with modern technology. ModulArt as the key answer to the need of defining the artist's work, finding the right balance between art, audience and copyrights". Vagnini's ModulArt is theorized and applied in a theoretical book, in a book + DVD of modular poems and a cd. Writer, painter, and art theorist Gian Ruggero Manzoni described the modularity of Vagnini's compositions as “circular like the existence, his works are not finished, but merely stimulus for new voices”.

Vagnini's ModulArt in musical composition coincides and was developed independently during the same period of time with Leda Luss Luyken's ModulArt in the realm of painting.

ModulArt Projects

- Via Crucis
- Zoo – world modular project performed in Italy June 2002, Festival Villa e Castella, art director Nino Finauri and in Sunny Isles Beach Miami, May 2009
- Zero
- Aenigma
- Messa Picena

ModulArt Performances

- Back to Bach
- Sconcerto
- Gabersuite
- SacrAriae
- Small Packages from Italy
- Visions
- The Gothic Dream
- Sweet Suite Life
- Volare
- FaceBach
- KosmodulArt
- Sono Ergo Sum

== Publications ==
- 1986 – Isola di Koch – LP recorded and performed in Notre Dame de Paris (France), “L’orgue du Dimanche” Organ Festival (Ed. Nautilus, Fano)
- 1994 – Nicolaus – CD (Ed. Bongiovanni, Bologna)
- 2002 – Via Crucis – CD (Ed. Falcon Valley Music, Roma)
- 2002 – The Modular Method in Music – Book (Ed. Falcon Valley Music, Roma)
- 2003 – Messa Picena (Ed. Falcon Valley Music, Roma)
- 2007 – Salmodiesubliminali – Poems’ Book + DVD (Ed. Campanotto, Udine)
- 2014 – De Revolutionibus, Homage to Nicolaus Copernicus – CD – Modular Project for Organ (Stefano Vagnini) and Soprano (Giorgia Ragni) Recorded and Published in Przeczno Poland.
- 2018 – Ergo Sum, deep music experience- Book, a new program/therapy which combines music with mathematics in order to re-organize and rehabilitate emotional disorders and slow down degenerative diseases (Dementia and Alzheimer).
