= Norman Carlberg =

American artist (1928–2018)

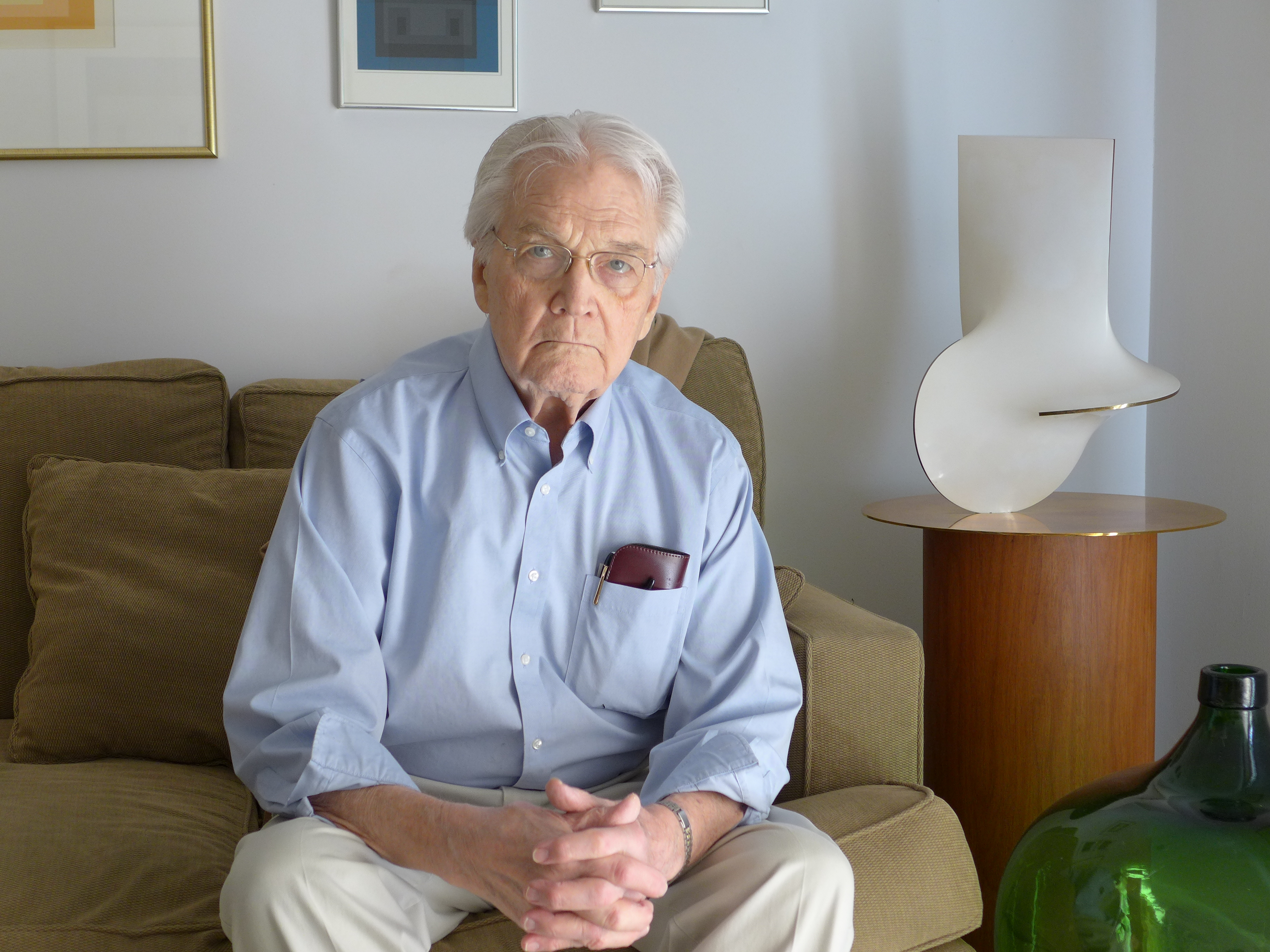
- Born: November 6, 1928; Roseau, Minnesota, U.S.
- Died: November 11, 2018 (aged 90); Baltimore, Maryland, U.S.
- Education: Yale University (BFA, MFA)
- Known for: Sculpture, prints, photography
- Works: Winter Wind, 1983–1986 Riverside Center, Brisbane, Australia
- Style: Geometric abstraction
- Movement: Modernism; modular constructivism
- Spouse: Juanita Carlberg
- Children: 1
- Website: https://g11.org.uk/jncarlberg/Homepage.html

Norman K. Carlberg (November 6, 1928 – November 11, 2018) was an American sculptor, photographer, and printmaker. He is noted as an exemplar of the modular constructivist style.

== Early life and education ==
Carlberg was born in Roseau, Minnesota. He was the son of Gustav Carlberg and his wife Alma Forsberg. He studied at the Minneapolis School of Art and then enlisted in the Air Force. He finished his undergraduate and graduate degree in art at the Yale School of Art under Josef Albers, who was instrumental in his acceptance as a student at Yale and his nomination for a Fulbright Fellowship to teach at Pontifical Catholic University of Chile. During his time in Chile, Norman became good friends with sculptor Sergio Castillo and others who spent time in the Barrio Bellavista bohemian quarter of Santiago, such as Manfred Max-Neef. Besides Josef Albers, Robert Engman was a huge influence as a teacher and later as a good friend. Carlberg died on 11 November 2018.

== Exhibitions and career ==
Carlberg enjoyed a number of exhibitions throughout his career that ranged from one-man shows to group exhibits.

Carlberg taught briefly (1960–61) in Santiago, Chile at the Pontifical Catholic University of Chile. In 1961, Eugene Leake hired Norman as the Director of the Rinehart School of Sculpture at the Maryland Institute College of Art (MICA) in Baltimore. He taught at MICA until his retirement in 1997.

== Working with architect Harry Seidler ==
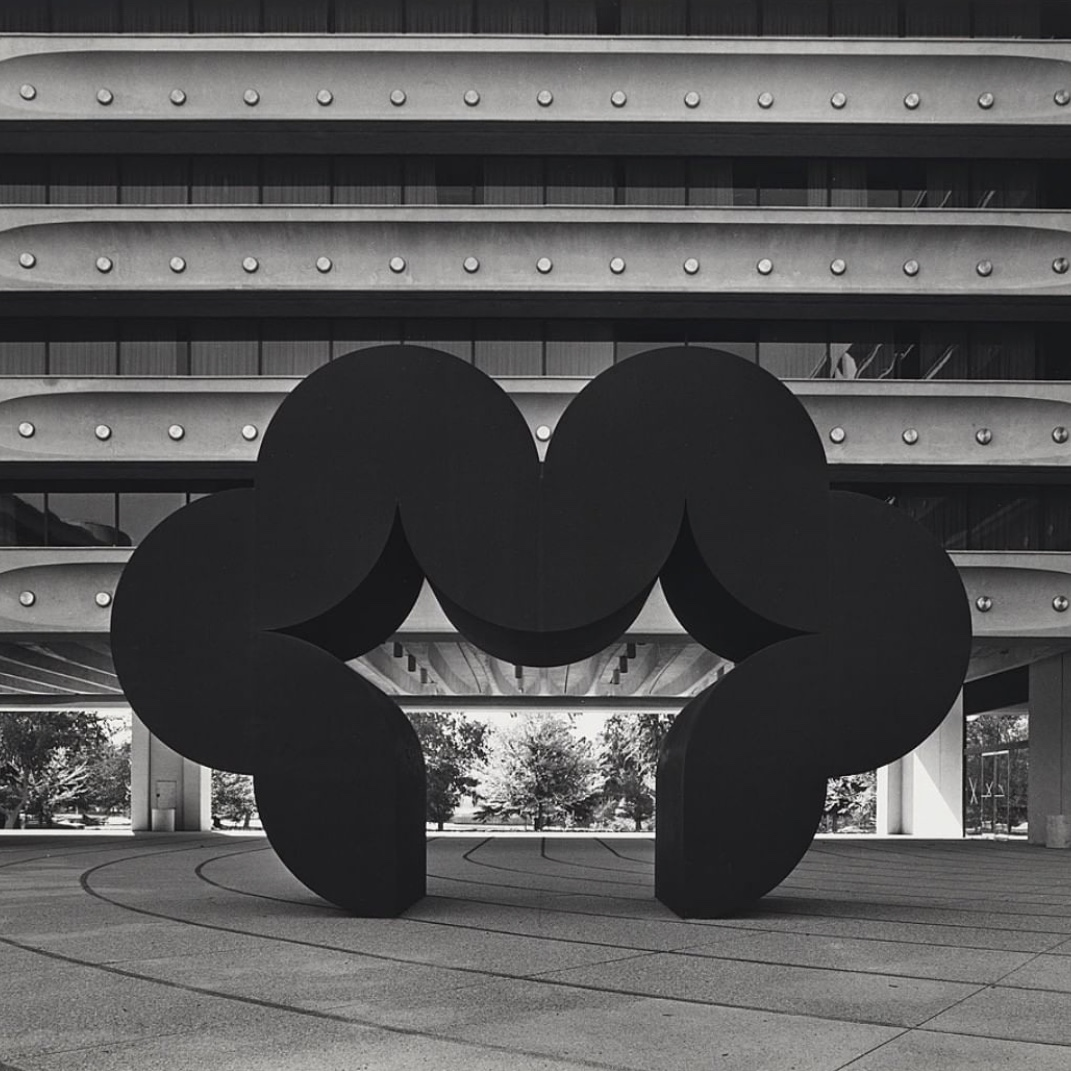
Black Widow, by Norman Carlberg (1975). Commissioned for Harry Seidler and Associates for Edmund Barton Building in Canberra, Australia. Photo courtesy of John Roach

Harry Seidler was an Australian architect who was a leading proponent of Modernism in Australia, and was the first to incorporate key principals of the Bauhaus in his architectural projects in Australia. As relayed in Kenneth Frampton’s 1992 book on Harry Seidler’s work, Harry “was first introduced to Norman Carlberg’s sculptures in Josef and Anni Alber’s house in America in the 1960s. They proudly showed me one of his positive reversal pieces in their living room. ‘it really works — doesn’t it?’ said Albers, which was a rare compliment”. From that indirect introduction to Carlberg’s work, Carlberg and Seidler established a correspondence that led to a friendship, a mutual admiration, and a mutually symbiotic interaction where each was able to beneficially help the other. In the case of Seidler, the geometric forms of Carlberg’s work (as well as fellow artists Charles O. Perry and Frank Stella) influenced the direction of Seidler’s architectural designs. Conversely, Seidler had commissioned Carlberg to produce large pieces of artwork that allowed Carlberg to extend his work into a larger scale than he had ever accomplished previously. One of these project was the Riverside Centre, designed by Harry Seidler and Associates in Brisbane, Australia, which includes a Carlberg piece titled Winter Wind – a 10 meter high indoor sculpture.

== Style: Modular constructivism, minimalism ==
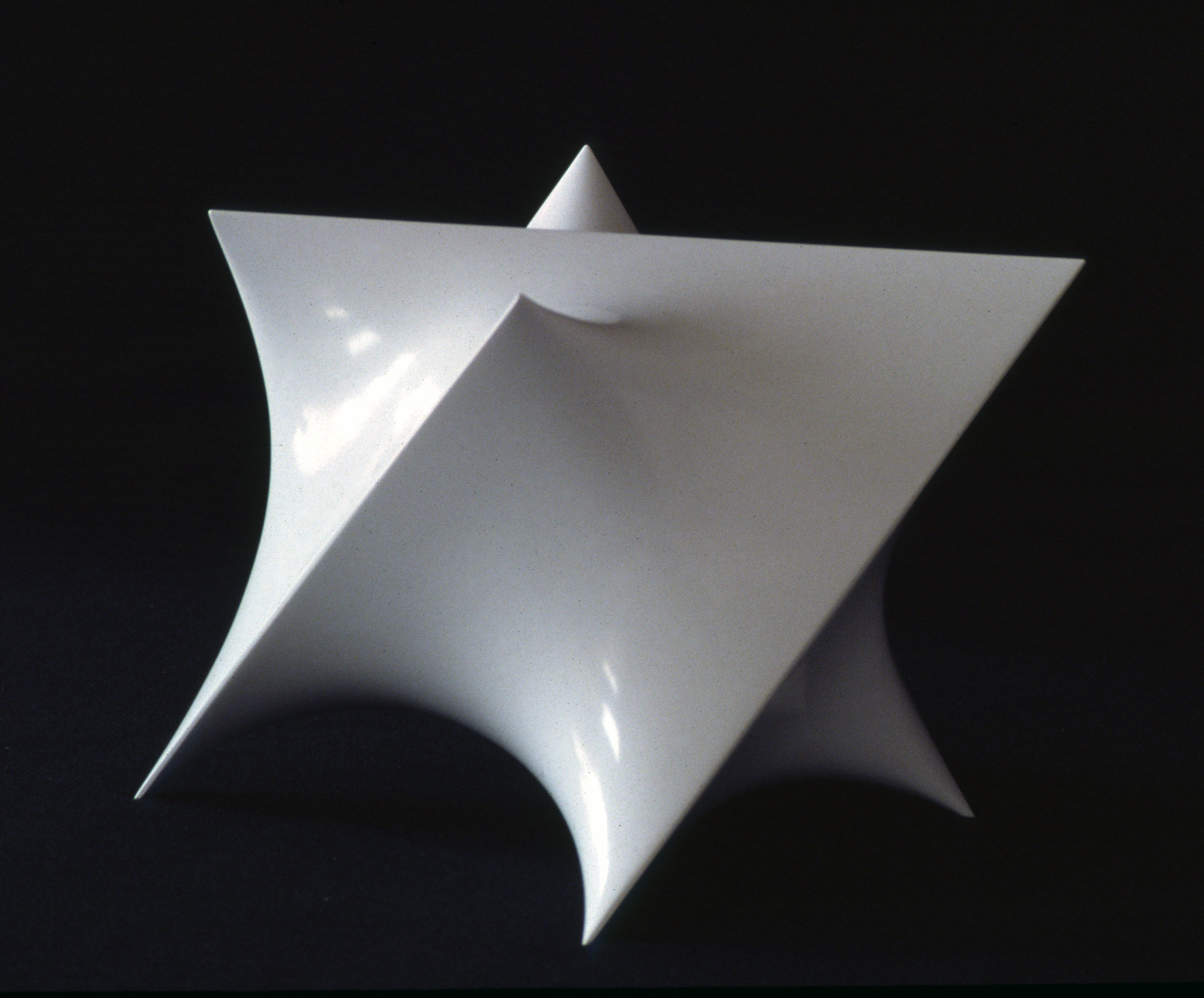
Minimal Surface Form 6, by Norman Carlberg. In the collection of the Hirshhorn Museum.

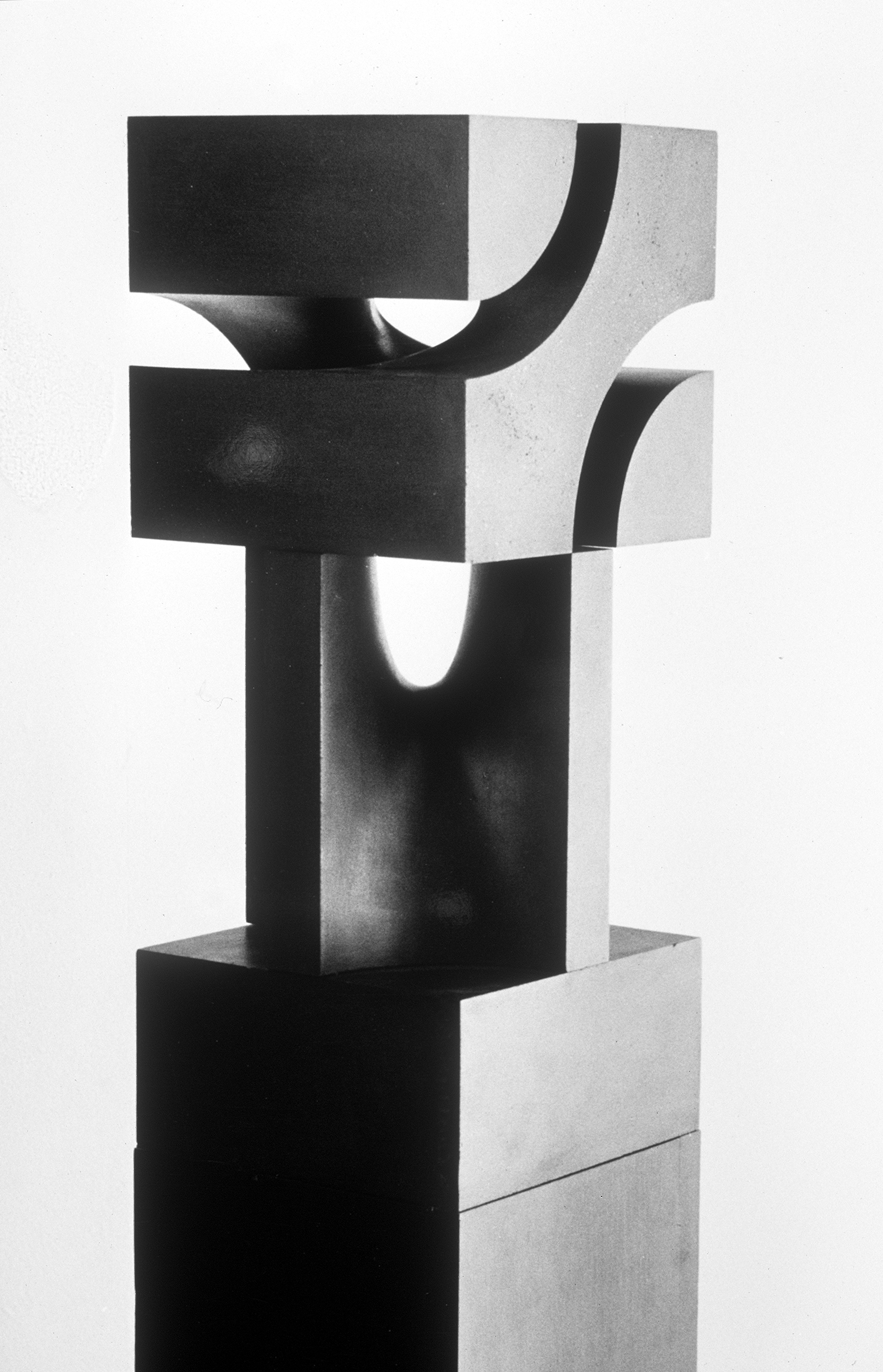
Positive-Negative Form 1, by Norman Carlberg

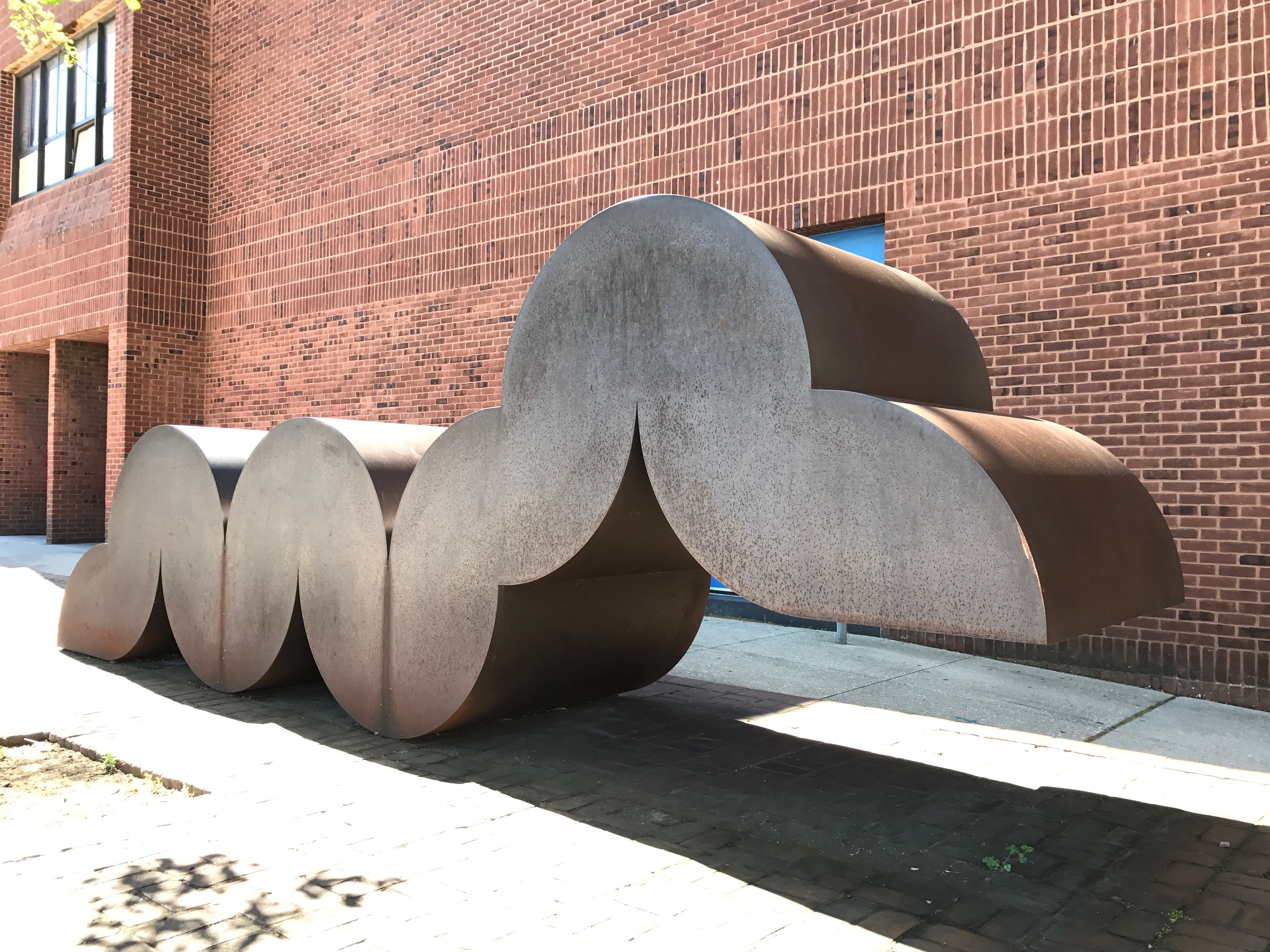
Caterpillar (1976) in front of Dallas F. Nicholas Sr. Elementary School in Baltimore, MD.

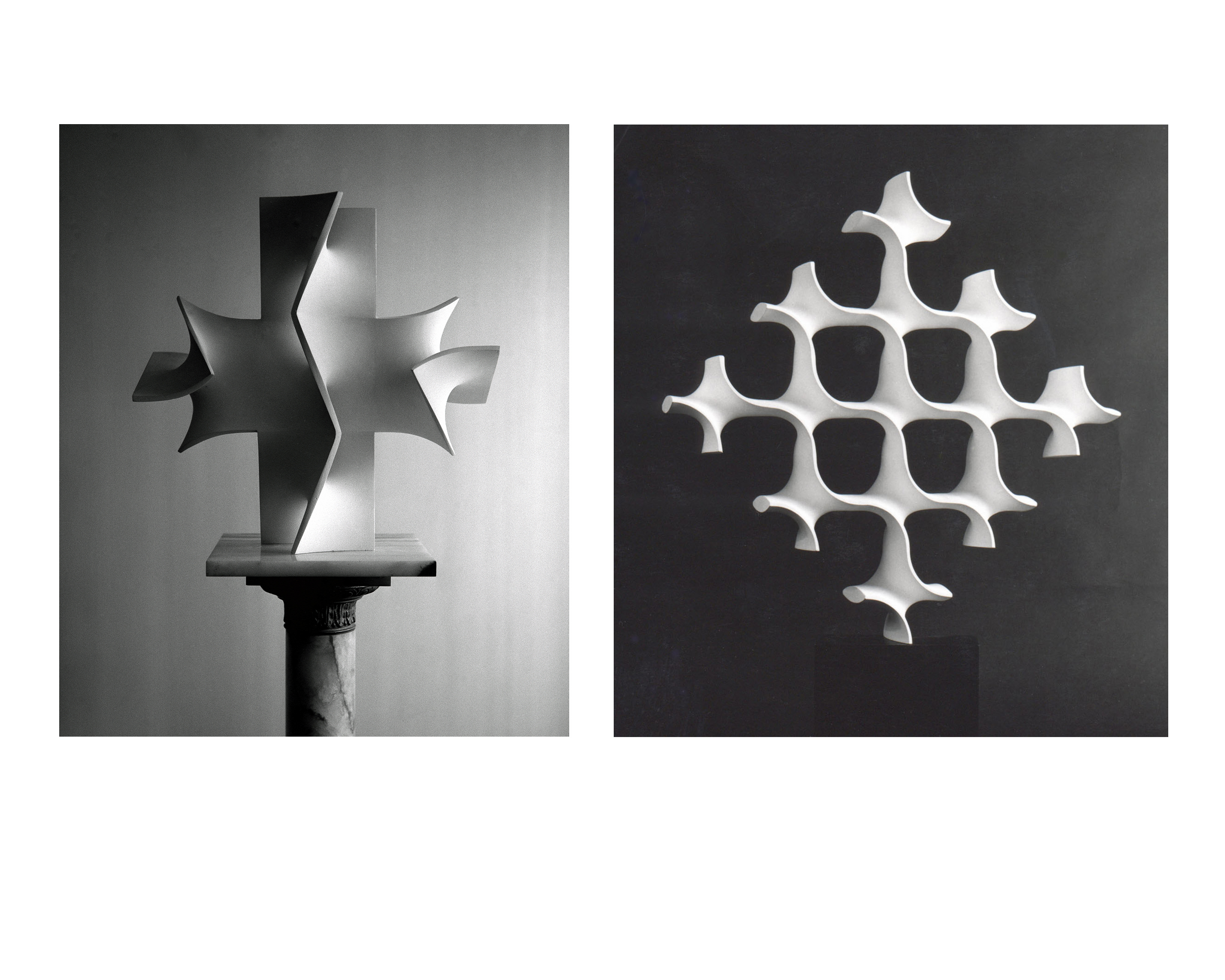
Two Modular crosses, by Norman Carlberg

Carlberg has written: "My style of sculpture represents the movement known as 'modular constructivism', which grew into its maturity and popularity in the 50s and 60s." The "modular" aspect of Carlberg's constructions is often readily apparent to the eye. Carlberg discussed modular constructivism with art critic Brian Sherwin, stating,

My sense of it is that "modular" constructivism is making a work of art within the limitations that modules impose on the object. They restrict what can be made but the restrictions also give meaning and value to the object, just as a poem is beautiful, in part, because the rules, or limitations, give the words a structure that the mind finds pleasurable over and above the message.

Carlberg's sculptures often consist of repetitions of such a unit, a basic shape capable of combining with other such elements in various ways—somewhat in the way a composer such as Bach or Webern might compose a piece of music by exploring the combinatorial possibilities of a single motivic cell, working within implicit constraints. At Yale, Erwin Hauer was an important influence who prodded Carlberg in this stylistic direction. While both men often employed curvilinear forms as modules, Carlberg more often used relatively geometric, hard-edged design units, often combining curves with straight edges (or flat planes) in the same module. His prints, mostly dating after 1970, show a similar preoccupation with precision, simplicity, and modularity. Some are actually groups of prints, placed contiguously together on a wall, with each print conceived as a module.

Another theme that distinguished Carlberg's work in the Constructivism movement was his exploration in the positive-negative contrast of his modular units. The concept is simple, but its realization into artwork can be challenge in achieving its goal in a subtle manner that does not detract from the piece in its entirety.

== Collections ==
Carlberg's sculptures are in the permanent collections of the Whitney Museum of American Art in New York, the Art and Architecture Gallery at Yale University in New Haven, Connecticut, the Pennsylvania Academy of Fine Arts in Philadelphia, the Hirshhorn Museum, the Guggenheim Museum, the Art Collection of the First National Bank of Chicago, and the Baltimore Museum of Art, as well as in the private collections of Congressman Tom Foley and author/broadcaster/journalist Robert St. John.

== See also ==
- Constructivism (art)
- Minimalism
- Formalism (art)
- Riverside Centre (one of Carlberg's collaborative projects)
- Jane Frank (noted student of Carlberg)
- Earl Hofmann (MICA art teacher)
