= Erwin Hauer =

American sculptor

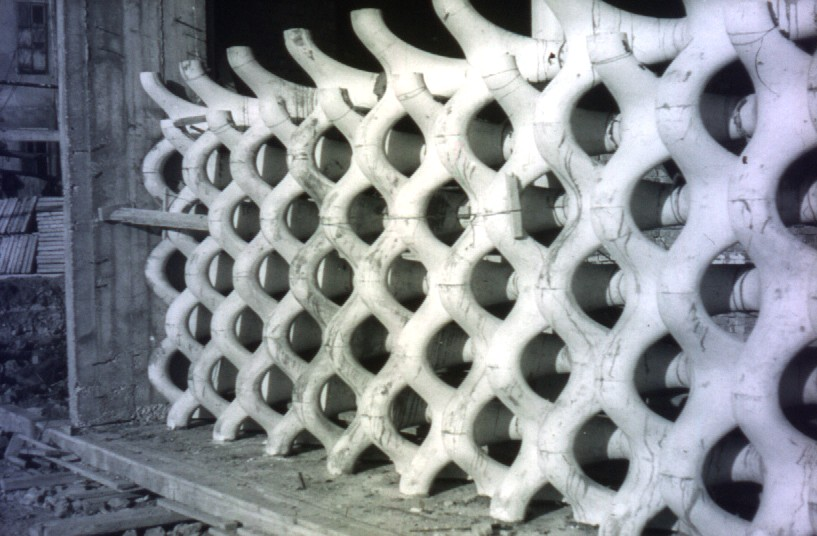
light-diffusing wall design 3 in church in Liesing, Vienna, Austria, 1952

Erwin Hauer (January 18, 1926, Vienna, Austria - December 22, 2017, Branford, Connecticut) was an Austrian-born American sculptor who studied first at Vienna's Academy of Applied Arts and later under Josef Albers at Yale. Hauer was an early proponent of modular constructivism and an associate of Norman Carlberg. Like Carlberg, he was especially known for his minimalist, repetitive pieces in the 1950s and 1960s.

According to ribabookshops.com, Hauer's sculptures are in many public collections, including those of the Brooklyn Museum of Art, the Art Institute of Chicago, the Wadsworth Atheneum, the Museum of the National Academy of Design, and others. Erwin Hauer was Professor Emeritus at the Yale University School of Art, where he taught from 1957 until 1990.

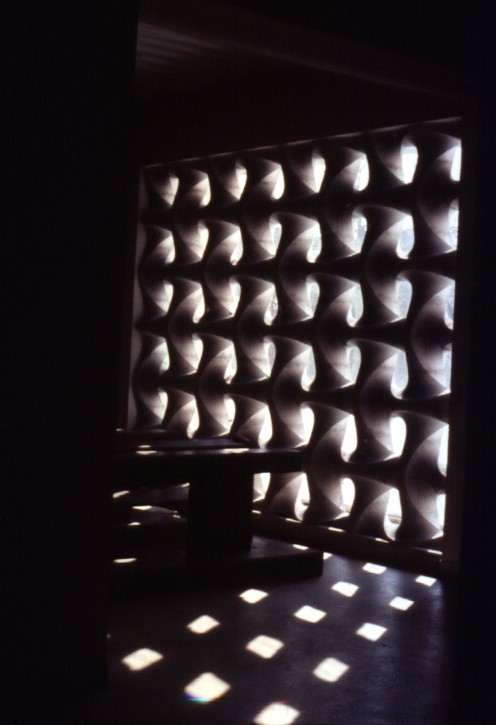
light-diffusing wall design 2 in church in Liesing, Vienna, Austria, 1951

Hauer's design studio in New Haven, Connecticut is well known for the production of sculptural, light-diffusing architectural screens and walls employing Hauer's modular style.

== See also ==
- Constructivism (art)
- Minimalism
