= Modular constructivism =

Modular constructivism is a style of sculpture that emerged in the 1950s and 1960s and was associated especially with Erwin Hauer and Norman Carlberg. It is based on carefully structured modules which allow for intricate and in some cases infinite patterns of repetition, sometimes used to create limitless, basically planar, screen-like formations, and sometimes employed to make more multidimensional structures. Designing these structures involves intensive study of the combinatorial possibilities of sometimes quite curvilinear and fluidly shaped modules, creating a seamless, quasi-organic unity that can be either rounded and self-enclosed, or open and potentially infinite. The latter designs have proved useful and attractive for use in eye-catching architectural walls and screens, often featuring complex patterns of undulating, tissue-like webbing, with apertures which transmit and filter light, while generating delicate patterns of shadow.

Writing in Architecture Week (August 4, 2004), Hauer explains that "Continuity and potential infinity have been at the very center of my sculpture from early on." Hauer made an extensive study of biomorphic form, especially what he calls "saddle surfaces," which combine convex and concave curvature and thus allow for smooth self-combination, sometimes in multiple dimensions. Another inspiration is the sculpture of Henry Moore, with its fluid curves and porosity.

Hauer's enthusiasm caught the imagination of his colleague at Yale, Norman Carlberg. Both were devoted students of the arch-formalist Josef Albers. Indeed, from the beginning, there was in this modular approach to sculpture an implicit formalism and even minimalism which held itself aloof from some of the other artistic trends of the time, such as the pop art and post-modernism that were just beginning to emerge. As Carlberg recalls, within his artistic circle "you analysed, you looked at something, but you looked at it formally just for what it was and the message was almost always out of it."

== See also ==
- Constructivism (art)
- Serial art
