= Leda Luss Luyken =

Greek conceptual artist (born 1952)

Leda Luss Luyken, née Valata, (born 1952 in Athens) is a Greek-American conceptual artist, who lives and works in Germany.

== Biography ==
Leda Luss-Luyken was educated at the Ecole d'Humanité in Switzerland and studied arts and architecture in Zurich, New York and Manchester. During that time she was particularly influenced by the works of Frank Lloyd Wright, Mies van der Rohe and Richard Neutra as well as Japanese garden architecture.

She then began her professional career as an architectural designer and interior architect in New York, working intensively with designs by Charles Eames, Herman Miller and Eero Saarinen.

Drawing on this experience, Leda Luss Luyken has been working since 1983 as a conceptual artist in England, Germany and Greece. She received painting tutorials from Alfred de Vivanco, a pupil of Emil Nolde and is regularly being coached by Gisela Sellenriek (Academy of Fine Arts Berlin and Munich).

== Works ==
=== Figurative works 1985 to 1996 ===
This is a body of work ranging from life drawing to expressive figurative paintings depicting personifications of the condition humaine. They were shown in two major solo shows in Amsterdam and are documented in a monograph.

=== ModulArt 1996 to date ===
ModulArt is Leda Luss Luyken's conceptual innovation, a "new way of motion in painting" (Denys Zacharopoulos). Luss Luyken has produced cycles of paintings using this innovative technique: Millennium (1996–2002); Greek Spirit (2003–2005); Genesis (2006–2008); 96% Dark Matter (2008–2010); Cosmos Sensual (2010–2011). Each of these cycles comprises approximately 20 large scale paintings measuring 180 : 180 cm or more.

In terms of contemporary art, ModulArt belongs to the category of conceptual art. It is not so much the finished painting but its openness to change and alterability that define the basic idea of ModulArt. The painter's subjects are open to their de- and reconstruction into new, modulated images. To do so, the artist lets go of her work and allows for its further development by the viewer. The viewer thus becomes an active user of art. Modulated images open up new perspectives and insights on the subject, the artistic development of a piece of art remains in a state of flux. Such further development of a ModulArt painting is open-source and can be done any time in nearly unlimited variations. Luss Luyken's ModulArt coincides and was developed independently during the same period of time with Stefano Vagnini's ModulArt in the realm of musical composition. Both hold that the artist’s tools to creativity are virtually unlimited by way of ModulArt.

Luss-Luyken's ModulArt was publicly exhibited in museums in Leipzig, Munich, Berlin and Weimar as well as in major solo shows in galleries in Amsterdam, Berlin, Zurich and Munich. Luss Luyken's ModulArt is documented in a catalogue, a monograph, a collector's catalogue and three films.

== Museum exhibitions ==
- 1996 Museum Grassi in Leipzig | solo exhibition | Palympsistos |
- 2001 Haus der Kunst | München (K 01) |
- 2003 Abgusssammlung Antiker Plastik | Berlin | solo exhibition | 4Olympia04 |
- 2004 Haus der Kunst | München (K 04) |
- 2008 Stadtmuseum in Weimar | solo exhibition | Greek Spirit |
- 2012 Cultural Centre of Apollonia Milou | solo exhibition | A Voluntary Love |

== Works in the public domain ==
- 1985 — 1000 Jahre Verden | glass mural | stained glass | 10 m × 2.50 m (32.8 ft × 8.2 ft)
- 1988 — Links | The European Institute for the Media | Manchester, England | 480 cm × 180 cm (189 in × 71 in)
- 1999 — Links | 480 cm × 2,180 cm (190 in × 860 in) | Landesanstalt für Medien | Düsseldorf, Germany
- 2002 — Aphroditi | United Buddy Bear contracted by the Embassy of the Hellenic Republic, Berlin and sponsored by Honorary Consul Mme. Madeleine Schickedanz | exhibited at the Brandenburger Tor in Berlin and auctioned for the benefit of UNICEF
- 2003 — Olympic Ambassador | Buddy Bear for the Hellenic Republic, publicly shown in 2003 Berlin | 2003 Kitzbühel (AU) | 2004 Hong Kong | 2004 Istanbul | 2005 Tokyo | 2005 Seoul | 2005 Sydney | 2006 Berlin | 2006 Vienna | 2007 Cairo | 2007 Jerusalem | 2008 Warsaw | 2008 Stuttgart | 2008 Pong Yang | 2009 Buenos Aires | 2009 Montevideo | 2009 Berlin | 2010 Astana | 2010 Helsinki |2011 Sofia |2012 New Delhi |2013 Paris |2014 Rio de Janeiro |2015 Havana
- 2004/05 — Gelber Engel |sculpture 63 cm × 99 cm × 85 cm (25 in × 39 in × 33 in) | commissioned by ADAC Germany | on public display at ADAC Cologne |
- 2010 — 2K1| a contemporary DanceModulartVideo project | Kunsthalle whiteBOX Kultfabrik | Munich |

== Major solo gallery shows ==
- 1969 Stöckli Ausstellung, Ecole d'Humanité, Goldern, Switzerland
- 1987 5th Annual Exhibition of Young Artists, Cavendish House, Manchester, U.K.
- 1990 My Gender: a Woman Paints Women, Casabella Gallery, Manchester, U.K.
- 1992 Always at Midnight, Gallery Brouwersgracht Twee Drie Acht, Amsterdam, the Netherlands
- 1994 De koning en zijn hofhouding, Gallery Brouwersgracht Twee Drie Acht, Amsterdam, the Netherlands
- 1994 Right or Wrong, my Love, Galerie Belarte, Dübendorf, ZH, Switzerland
- 1998 Farbige und Weiße, Kunstpavillion Munich, Germany
- 1999 Perhaps Love, Gallerie Brouwersgracht Twee Drie Acht, Amsterdam, the Netherlands
- 2001 Die Sünde, HYPOSWISS, Zurich, Switzerland
- 2002 Six-pack, Galerie Browersgracht Twe Drie Acht, Amsterdam, the Netherlands
- 2004 Overzichtstentoonstelling 1991–2004, Gallery Twee Drie Acht, Amsterdam, the Netherlands
- 2006 Greek Spirit: e-motion, camera artis, Schauplatz für moderne Kunst, Munich, Germany
- 2008 Genesis, Camera artis, Schauplatz für moderne Kunst, Munich, Germany
- 2008 RiceArt, Galerie Refugium, Dresden, Germany
- 2009 :ModulArt = 4^y x y!, Marstall, Berg, Germany
- 2010 ModulArt: Freude an Innovation, BMW - SM, Munich | Germany
- 2010 |local > global | P1 | arts space | Melos | Greece
- 2011 Cosmos Sensual, ars24, Munich, Germany

== Art trade fair shows ==
- 2011 | Ai15 | ART INNSBRUCK | Austria |
- 2011 | und#6 | Karlsruhe | Germany |
- 2011 | art Athina | Greece |
- 2012 | Ai16 | ART INNSBRUCK | Austria |

== Bibliography ==
- Breaking the Rules | Die Regeln brechen, ed by Tom Prader, English and German | 127 pp. | 84 color prints, Zurich | 1997
- TryDax, Designed and edited by Klaus Walterspiel, 19 pp. with numerous color prints | Munich | 2000
- Leda Luss Luyken :ModulArt, ed. by Georg von Kap-herr | English and German | 112 pp. with 60 color prints | Bobingen | 2008 |
- Wanderjahre, Arbeiten aus der Sammlung Kaske 1970-2010, ed by Anna Wondrak, Munich, 2011 |

== Films ==
- Παντα ρει: Leda Luss-Luyken's ModulArt | Film + TV feature | 12’ | by 3’30” films |Berlin | 2004 |
- :ModulArt©LLL, 1’30” | by Roman Luyken | Studio L | London | 2009 |
- Leda Luss Luyken: ModulArt | TV Feature by Peider Defilla | for BRα - ARD TV | Munich | 15' | 2011 |

== Memberships ==
- Kulturverein Berg | Germany
- Kunstverein München k.m | Munich | Germany
