= Serial art =

Art movement

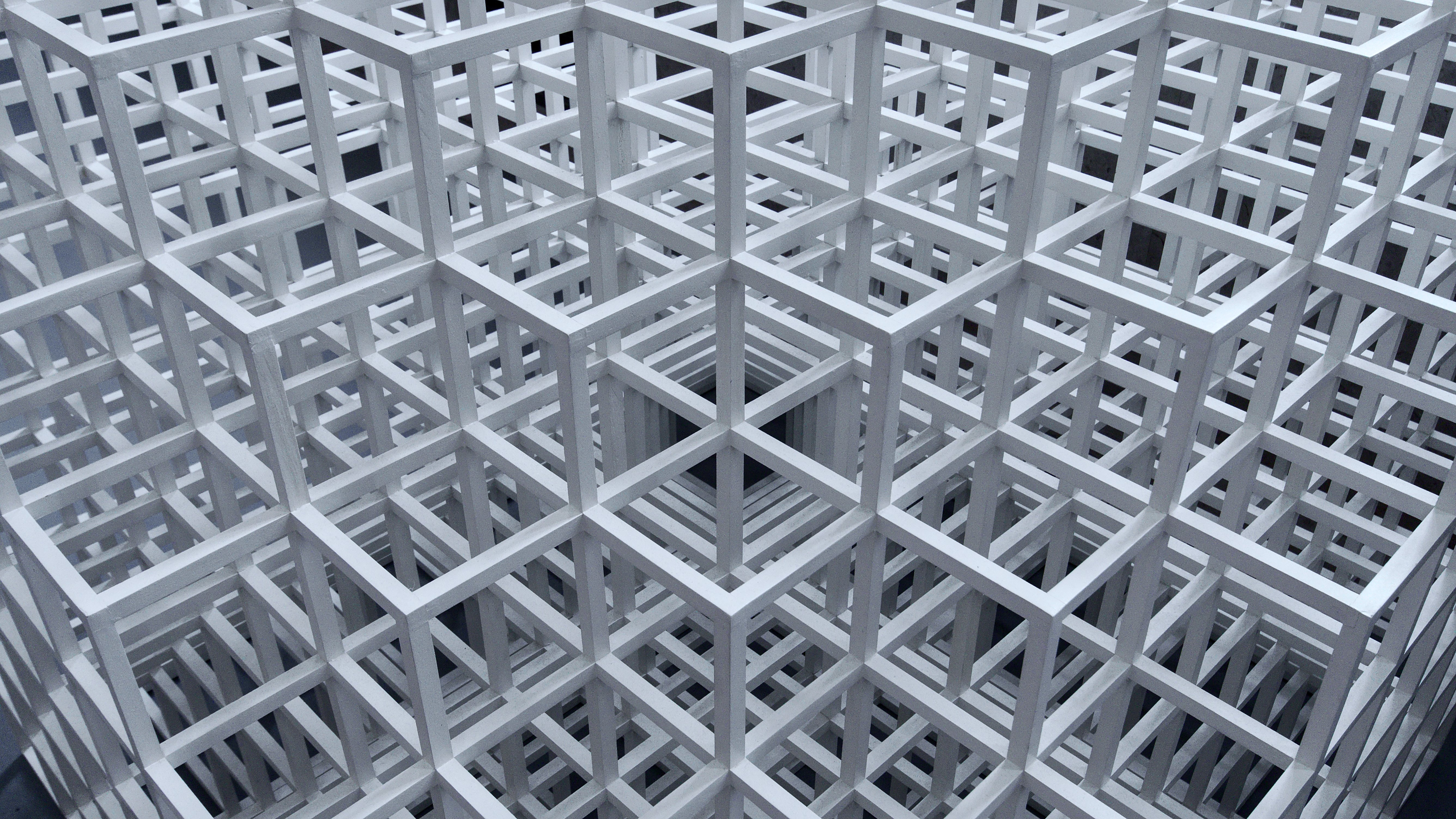
Cube structure based on nine modules, a 1979 serial art piece by artist Sol LeWitt.

Serial art is an art movement within conceptual art in which elements or objects, frequently uniform and machine-made (for example, bricks), were assembled, often in a systematic way.

One type of serial art is the production of multiple objects (paintings, sculptures, etc.) in sets or series, for example Josef Albers' well-known series of “square” paintings, where a single, repeating image creates a variation series. This technique later became associated with minimalism, the “multiple”, and “ABC art”. However, there is a different type, which may be regarded as more essentially “serial” because it is “characterized by the nonhierarchical juxtaposition of equivalent representations, which only yield their complete meaning on the basis of their mutual relationship”. This produces sequential structures defined similarly to those of a twelve-tone row, found for example in Max Bill's series, Fünfzehn Variationen über ein Thema (1934–38), and in Richard Paul Lohse's 30 vertikale systematische Farbreihen in gelber Rautenform (1943–70) and Konkretion III (1947). By the early 1970s, the large-scale assemblage had evolved into use of found materials, forming serial pieces. Carl Andre created minimalist installations characterized by geometrical layouts of repetitive patterns using mass-produced modular parts, like bricks or cutouts from sheet metal.

Other artists produced multi-component fabricated pieces during this period. Robert Smithson's Alogon (1966) utilized stainless steel to create a work composed of seven identical sections. Lynda Benglis's Pinto had five separate polyurethane foam units cantilevered from the wall. Nancy Graves created the thirty-six part work Variability of Similar Forms (1970); using wax, acrylic, marble dust, and steel, the piece mimicked animal leg skeletons combined in a variety of spatial arrangements.

The artist Sol LeWitt wrote that "the serial artist does not attempt to produce a beautiful or mysterious object but functions merely as a clerk cataloguing the results of his premise."

== See also ==
- Contemporary art
- Formalism (art)
- Geometric abstraction
- Hard-edge painting
- Information art
- Modernism
- Modular constructivism
- Op Art
- Post-modernism
- Serialism, a musical concept
- Structuralism
- Systems art

== Sources ==
- Guderian, Dietmar. 1985. “Serielle Strukturen und harmonikale Systeme.” In Vom Klang der Bilder: die Musik in der Kunst des 20. Jahrhunderts, edited by Karin von Maur, 434–37. Munich: Prestel-Verlag.
- Hunter, Sam, and John Jacobus. 1986 Modern Art . Englewod Cliffs, NJ: Prentice-Hall Inc; New York: Harry Abrams Inc.
- Sykora, Katharina. 1983. Das Phänomen des Seriellen in der Kunst: Aspekte einer künstlerischen Methode von Monet bis zur amerikanischen Pop Art. Würzburg: Könighausen + Neumann.
- Widman, Lorraine Balmuth (1989). "The Serial Piece". Sculpture, a Studio Guide: Concepts, Methods, and Materials. Englewood Cliffs, N.J.: Prentice Hall. ISBN 978-0-13-796590-8.
