= Manhattan (Josef Albers mural) =

Mural by Josef Albers

- The recreated mural c. 2021
- Artist: Josef Albers
- Completion date: 1963; 2019
- Dimensions: 8.5 m × 16 m (28 ft × 54 ft)
- Location: MetLife Building, New York City; 40°45′11″N 73°58′37″W

Manhattan is a large scale mural by the German artist and colorist Josef Albers. The mural was first installed in New York City's MetLife Building, originally the Pan Am Building. Removed in 2001 during renovations of the building's lobby, the mural was rebuilt in 2019 according to Albers' original specifications. It is now installed in the lobby of the MetLife Building, and placed backwards at the summit of the escalators of the modernist skyscraper and Grand Central Terminal's Main Concourse. The work, 28 feet (8.5 m) tall by 54 feet (16 m) wide, was created using formica in red, white, and black. The original work was laden with asbestos.

== History ==
In 1929 Albers, then at The Bauhaus in Germany, created a work called "City". Years later in the early 1960s after having emigrated to the United States and settling in New York City the architect and founder of the Bauhaus Walter Gropius commissioned him to do a mural for the then new Pan Am Building (now MetLife building) at 200 Park Avenue. Subsequently, he worked his original design into the formidably sized "Manhattan". As Nicholas Fox Weber, Executive Director of the Josef and Anni Albers Foundation, explained: "In making the mural, he took a concept he had developed at the Bauhaus in sandblasted glass, and gave it new life on a vastly large scale to serve the purposes of his friend and colleague, Walter Gropius, who designed the original building and asked him to make the mural."

In 2001 the mural was taken down while the MetLife lobby was under renovation. Therein some years earlier ownership of the structure had changed hands and moniker to MetLife and the new owner's citing repurposing of the lobby to allow for more light to enter doubled with the fact the mural had been found to be laden with asbestos took the work down without notice. This then led to somewhat of an uproar.

In 2019 the new owners of the structure Tishman Speyer decided to reinstall the work in its original position. However, as the mural was disassembled into panels which were laden with asbestos, the work had to be recreated. Albers had left behind precise specifications that allowed for the work to be recreated. The installation was completed in September 2019.
