= Niagara Falls Convention and Civic Center =

Former multi-purpose indoor venue in Niagara Falls, New York

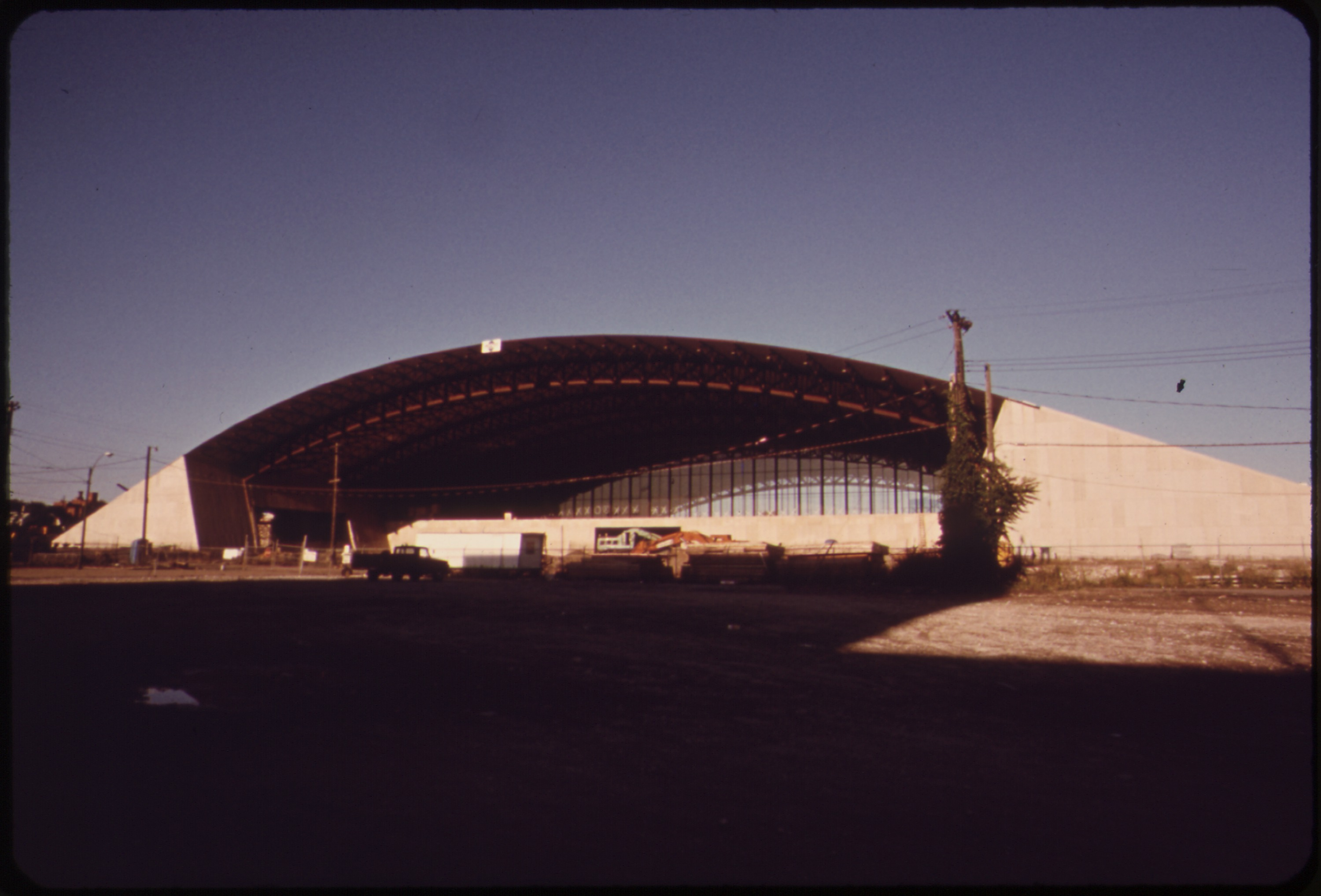
- Interactive map of Niagara Falls Convention and Civic Center
- Full name: Niagara Falls Convention and Civic Center
- Address: 310 4th Street
- Location: Niagara Falls, New York, U.S.
- Coordinates: 43.086°N 79.057°W
- Capacity: 10,000
- Type: Multi-purpose arena Convention center
- Events: Concerts; Sporting events

Construction
- Opened: January 12, 1974
- Closed: 2002
- Architect: Johnson/Burgee Architects

Tenant
- Niagara Purple Eagles men's basketball (1973–1982, 1988–1996)

Niagara Falls Convention and Civic Center was a 10,000-seat multi-purpose arena and convention center in Niagara Falls, New York from January 12, 1974, to 2002.

== Planning and construction ==
The venue was built in 1973 as part of an urban renewal project in the city of Niagara Falls. It was built in the center of a main thoroughfare, Falls Street, and blocked traffic to Niagara Falls State Park. It also eliminated Jefferson Avenue and Erie Avenue, two main thoroughfares.

The building was designed by Johnson/Burgee Architects in collaboration with Jane Davis Doggett. Its arched design was inspired by the rainbows commonly seen over Niagara Falls, according to architect Philip Johnson. Locals jokingly noted its resemblance to a Quonset hut.

== Notable events ==
=== Sports ===
The venue was home to the NCAA's Niagara Purple Eagles men's basketball team from 1973 to 1982 and again from 1988 to 1996.

The venue hosted the ABC Masters bowling tournament in 1983 and 1987.

World Wrestling Federation (WWF) presented 22 events at the venue between 1984 and 1997, including two tapings of WWF Wrestling Challenge.

In March 1992, a spectator was killed during a USHRA Monster Jam show at the venue when the driver of Bad Medicine became incapacitated and veered his truck into the stands. 82-year-old Lester Gilliam pushed a young boy out of harm's way and was then struck by the vehicle.

The venue hosted the gymnastics portion of the 1993 Summer Universiade in July 1993.

UFC 12 was scheduled to take place at the venue in February 1997, but mixed martial arts was banned in New York State the day before the event, forcing its relocation to Dothan, Alabama.

Joe Mesi defeated Jorge Luis Gonzalez in a professional boxing card at the venue in April 2001. Mesi would later defeat Bert Cooper at the venue in July 2001.

=== Other ===
The venue was host to Miss USA 1974, Miss USA 1975, and Miss USA 1976.

The Royal Lipizzan Stallions 30th-anniversary show in 2000.

In 1980, the venue began hosting the city's annual Festival of Lights to commemorate the Christmas season.

== Closure ==
The venue was closed in 2002 and converted into Seneca Niagara Casino & Hotel, which remains in operation. The 4,000-seat Niagara Falls Conference Center was opened across the street from the casino in 2004. Niagara Falls, Ontario took over hosting the Festival of Lights in 2004.

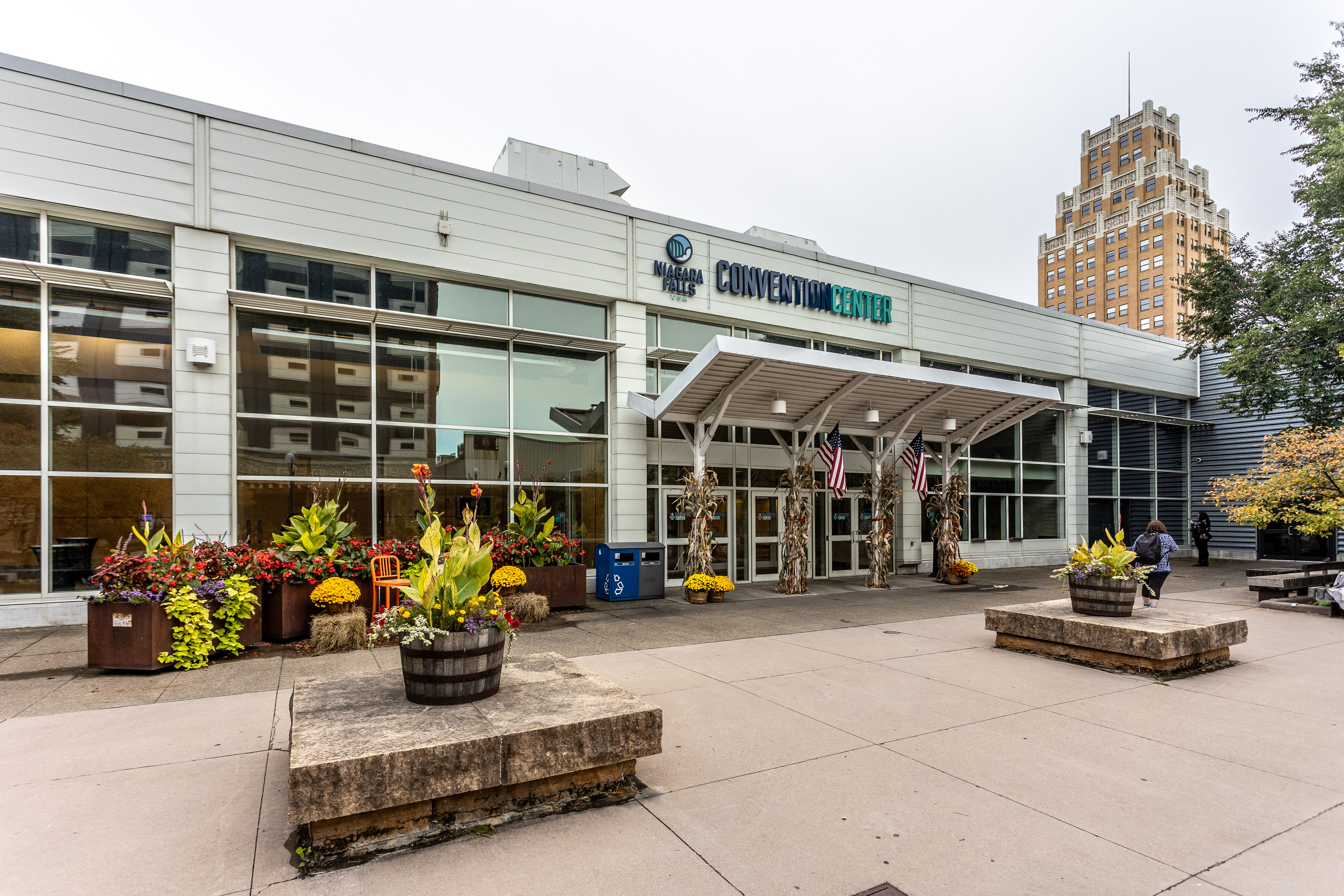
Niagara Falls Convention Center (NFCC)

== NFCC ==
In 2004, a new Niagara Falls Convention Center (NFCC) opened on Old Falls Street. The Old Falls Street venue has 116,000 square feet for exhibitions and meetings, and a 32,200-square-foot event/exhibit hall.
