= Josef Albers =

German-American artist (1888–1976)

- Albers in front of one of his Homage to the Square paintings
- Born: March 19, 1888; Bottrop, Westphalia, Prussia, German Empire
- Died: March 25, 1976 (aged 88); New Haven, Connecticut, U.S.
- Education: Königliche Kunstschule zu Berlin, Königliche Bayerische Akademie der Bildenden Kunst, Bauhaus
- Known for: Abstract painting, study of color
- Notable work: Homage to the Square (series), Structural Constellations, Glass Paintings
- Movement: Geometric abstraction
- Spouse: Anni Fleischmann (m. 1925)
- Website: albersfoundation.org

Signature
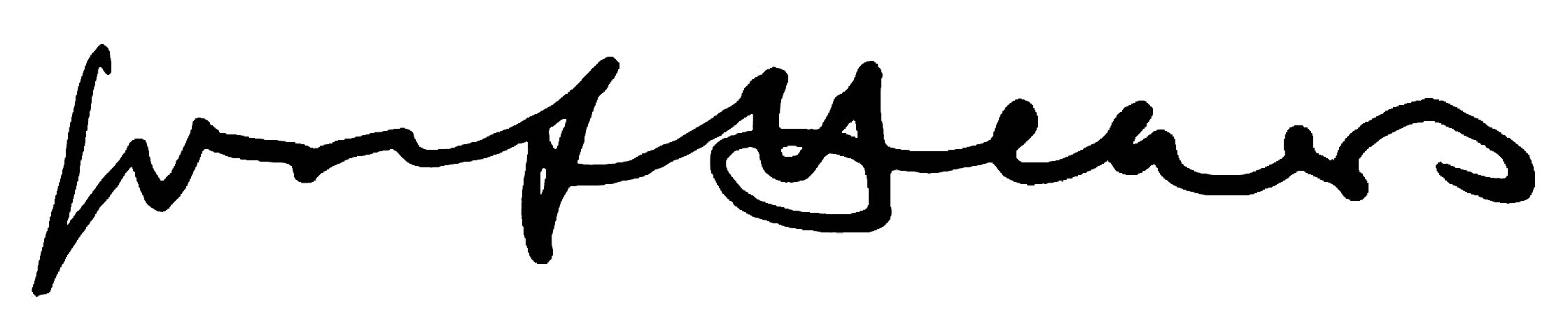

Josef Albers (/ˈælbərz/ AL-bərz, US also /ˈɑːl-/ AHL-, German: [ˈjoːzɛf ˈʔalbɐs]; March 19, 1888 – March 25, 1976) was a German-born American artist and educator who is considered one of the most influential 20th-century art teachers in the United States. Born in 1888 in Bottrop, Westphalia, Germany, into a Roman Catholic family with a background in craftsmanship, Albers received practical training in diverse skills like engraving glass, plumbing, and wiring during his childhood. He later worked as a schoolteacher from 1908 to 1913 and received his first public commission in 1918 and moved to Munich in 1919.

In 1920, Albers joined the Weimar Bauhaus as a student and became a faculty member in 1922, teaching the principles of handicrafts. With the Bauhaus's move to Dessau in 1925, he was promoted to professor and married Anni Fleischmann, a student at the institution and a textile artist. Albers's work in Dessau included designing furniture and working with glass, collaborating with established artists like Paul Klee. Following the Bauhaus's closure under Nazi orders in 1933, Albers emigrated to the United States, and he taught at the experimental liberal arts institution Black Mountain College in North Carolina until 1949.

At Black Mountain, Albers taught students who would later go on to become prominent artists such as Ruth Asawa and Robert Rauschenberg, and invited contemporary American artists to teach in the summer seminar, including the choreographer Merce Cunningham and Harlem Renaissance painter Jacob Lawrence. In 1950, he left for Yale University to head the design department, contributing significantly to its graphic design program. Albers's teaching methodology, prioritizing practical experience and vision in design, had a profound impact on the development of postwar Western visual art, while his book Interaction of Color, published in 1963, is considered a seminal work on color theory.

In addition to being a teacher, Albers was an active abstract painter and theorist, best known for his series Homage to the Square, in which he explored chromatic interactions with nested squares, meticulously recording the colors used. He also created murals, such as those for the Corning Glass Building and the Time & Life Building in New York City. In 1970, he and his wife lived in Orange, Connecticut, where they continued to work in their private studio. In 1971, Albers was the first living artist to be given a solo show at the Metropolitan Museum of Art in New York. Albers died in his sleep on March 25, 1976, at the Yale New Haven Hospital after being admitted for a possible heart ailment.

== Biography ==
Josef Albers, Rosa mystica ora pro nobis, 1918 (reconstruction, original destroyed c. 1944)

=== German years ===
==== Formative years in Westphalia ====
Albers was born into a Roman Catholic family of craftsmen in Bottrop, Westphalia, Germany, in 1888. His father, Lorenzo Albers, was variously a housepainter, carpenter, and handyman. His mother came from a family of blacksmiths. His childhood included practical training in engraving glass, plumbing, and wiring, giving Josef versatility and lifelong confidence in the handling and manipulation of diverse materials. He worked from 1908 to 1913 as a schoolteacher in his home town; he also trained as an art teacher at Königliche Kunstschule in Berlin, Germany, from 1913 to 1915. From 1916 to 1919 he began his work as a printmaker at the Kunstgewerbschule in Essen, where he learnt stained-glass making with Dutch artist Johan Thorn Prikker. In 1918 he received his first public commission, Rosa mystica ora pro nobis, a stained-glass window for a church in Bottrop. In 1919 he moved to Munich, Germany, to study at the Königliche Bayerische Akademie der Bildenden Kunst, where he was a pupil of Max Doerner and Franz Stuck.

==== Entry into the Bauhaus ====
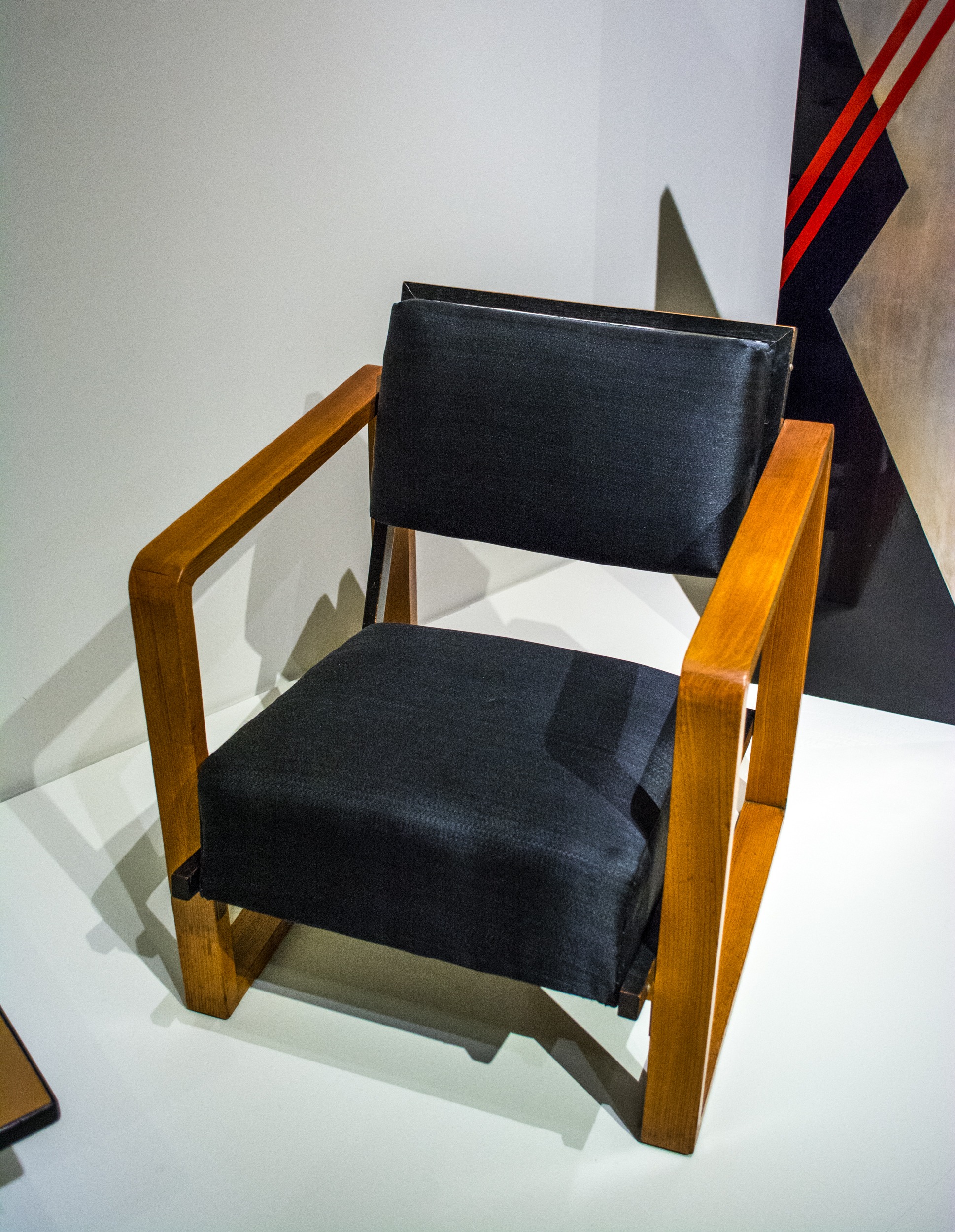
Armchair (late 1920s)

Albers enrolled as a student in the preliminary course (vorkurs) of Johannes Itten at the Weimar Bauhaus in 1920. Although Albers had studied painting, it was as a maker of stained glass that he joined the faculty of the Bauhaus in 1922, approaching his chosen medium as a component of architecture and as a stand-alone art form. The director and founder of the Bauhaus, Walter Gropius, asked him in 1923 to teach in the preliminary course 'Werklehre' of the department of design to introduce newcomers to the principles of handicrafts, because Albers came from that background and had appropriate practice and knowledge.

In 1925, the year the Bauhaus moved to Dessau, Albers was promoted to professor. At this time, he married Anni Albers (née Fleischmann) who was a student at the institution. His work in Dessau included designing furniture and working with glass. As a younger instructor, he was teaching at the Bauhaus among established artists who included Oskar Schlemmer, Wassily Kandinsky, and Paul Klee. The so-called "form master" Klee taught the formal aspects in the glass workshops where Albers was the "crafts master"; they cooperated for several years.

=== Emigration to the United States ===
==== Black Mountain College ====
With the closure of the Bauhaus under Nazi pressure in 1933 the artists dispersed, most leaving the country. Albers emigrated to the United States. The architect Philip Johnson, then a curator at the Museum of Modern Art in New York City, arranged for Albers to be offered a job as head of a new art school, Black Mountain College, in North Carolina. In November 1933, he joined the faculty of the college where he was the head of the painting program until 1949.

At Black Mountain, his students included Ruth Asawa, Ray Johnson, Robert Rauschenberg, Cy Twombly, and Susan Weil. He also invited important American artists such as Willem de Kooning, to teach in the summer seminar. Weil remarked that, as a teacher, Albers was "his own academy". She said that Albers claimed that "when you're in school, you're not an artist, you're a student", although he was very supportive of self-expression when one became an artist and began on her or his journey. Albers produced many woodcuts and leaf studies at this time.

==== Yale University ====
Josef Albers, Proto-Form (B), oil on fiberboard, 1938, Hirshhorn Museum and Sculpture Garden

In 1950, Albers left Black Mountain to head the department of design at Yale University in New Haven, Connecticut. While at Yale, Albers worked to expand the nascent graphic design program (then called "graphic arts"), hiring designers Alvin Eisenman, Herbert Matter, and Alvin Lustig. Albers worked at Yale until he retired from teaching in 1958. At Yale, Richard Anuszkiewicz, Eva Hesse, Neil Welliver, and Jane Davis Doggett were notable students.

In 1962, as a fellow at Yale, he received a grant from the Graham Foundation for the Advanced Studies of Fine Arts for an exhibit and lecture on his work. Albers also collaborated with Yale professor and architect King-lui Wu in creating decorative designs for some of Wu's projects. Among these were distinctive geometric fireplaces for the Rouse (1954) and DuPont (1959) houses, the façade of Manuscript Society, one of Yale's secret senior groups (1962), and a design for the Mt. Bethel Baptist Church (1973). Also, at this time he worked on his structural constellation pieces.

Also during this time, he created the abstract album covers of band leader Enoch Light's Command LP records. His album cover for Terry Snyder and the All Stars 1959 album, Persuasive Percussion, shows a tightly packed grid or lattice of small black disks from which a few wander up and out as if stray molecules of some light gas. He was elected a Fellow of the American Academy of Arts and Sciences in 1973. In 1970, Albers and his wife moved to Orange, Connecticut, where they continued to work in their private studio. Albers died in his sleep on March 25, 1976, at the Yale New Haven Hospital after being admitted for a possible heart ailment.

==== Command Records ====
Josef Albers produced album covers for over three years between 1959 and 1961, Albers's seven album sleeves for Command Records incorporated elements such as circles and grids of dots, highly uncommon in his practice. "The series of records made by Command Records over half a century ago still resonate with audiophiles today, and are much sought-after by connoisseurs of mid-century modern design for their striking covers. This was all due to the collaboration between two individuals, Josef Albers and Enoch Light. Both men—one an influential teacher and artist, the other a stereo-recording pioneer—driven by strong convictions and passion for their respective crafts."

== Works ==
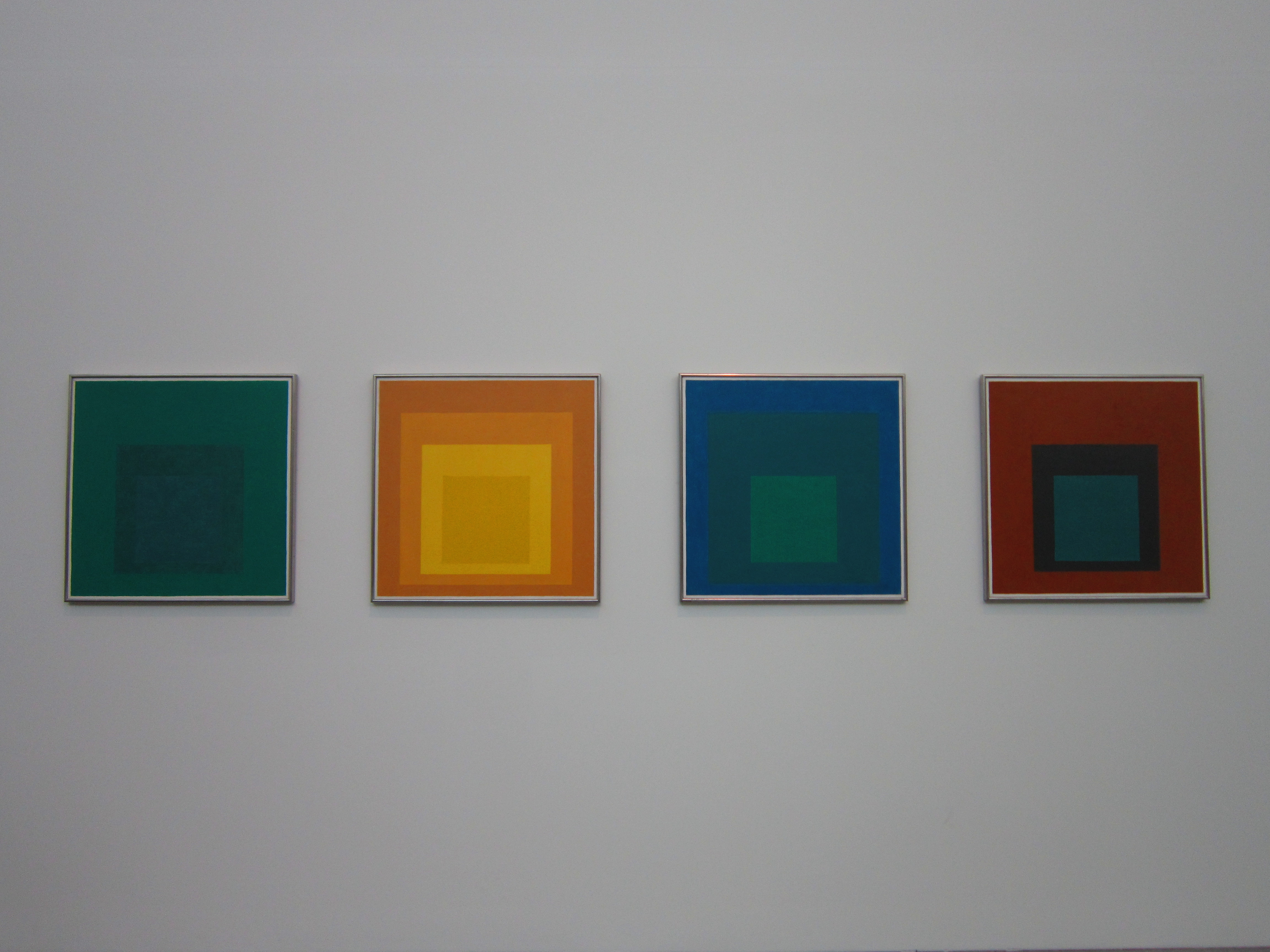
Four Homage to the Square paintings on display at the Tate Modern

=== Homage to the Square ===
Accomplished as a designer, photographer, typographer, printmaker, and poet, Albers is best remembered for his work as an abstract painter and theorist. He favored a very disciplined approach to composition, especially in the hundreds of paintings and prints that make up the series Homage to the Square. In this rigorous series, begun in 1949, Albers explored chromatic interactions with nested squares. Usually painting on Masonite, he used a palette knife with oil colors and often recorded the colors he used on the back of his works. Each painting consists of either three or four squares of solid planes of color nested within one another, in one of four different arrangements and in square formats ranging from 406×406 mm to 1.22×1.22 m.

=== Murals ===
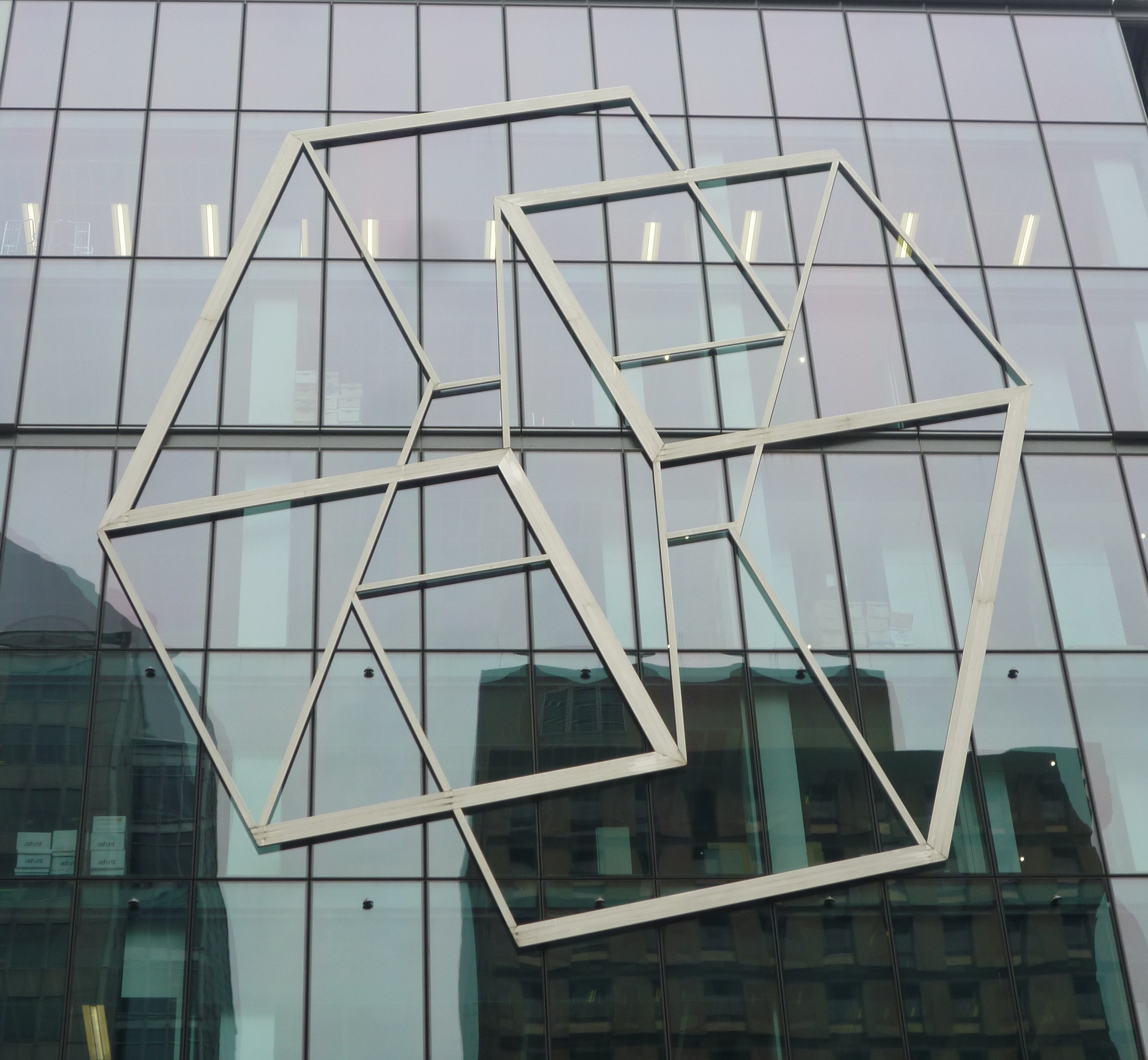
Albers Wrestling (1977) in Sydney

In 1959, a gold-leaf mural by Albers, Two Structural Constellations was engraved in the lobby of the Corning Glass Building in Manhattan. For the entrance of the Time & Life Building lobby, he created Two Portals (1961), a 42-feet by 14-feet mural of alternating glass bands in white and brown that recede into two bronze centers to create an illusion of depth. In the 1960s, Walter Gropius, who was designing the Pan Am Building with Emery Roth & Sons and Pietro Belluschi, commissioned Albers to make a mural. The artist reworked City, a sandblasted glass construction that he had designed in 1929 at the Bauhaus, and renamed it Manhattan. The giant abstract mural of black, white, and red strips arranged in interwoven columns stood 28-feet high and 55-feet wide and was installed in the lobby of the building; it was removed during a lobby redesign around 2000. Before he died in 1976, Albers left exact specifications of the work so that it could easily be replicated; in 2019, it was replicated and reinstalled in its original place in the Pan Am building, now renamed MetLife. In 1967, his painted mural Growth (1965) as well as Loggia Wall (1965), a brick relief, were installed on the campus of the Rochester Institute of Technology. Other architectural works include Gemini (1972), a stainless steel relief for the Grand Avenue National Bank lobby in Kansas City, Missouri, and Reclining Figure (1972), a mosaic mural for the Celanese Building in Manhattan destroyed in 1980. At the invitation of a former student, the Australian architect Harry Seidler, Albers designed the mural Wrestling (1976) for the Mutual Life Centre in Sydney.

== Color theory ==
In 1963, Albers published Interaction of Color, which is a record of an experiential way of studying and teaching color. He asserted that color "is almost never seen as it really is" and that "color deceives continually", and he suggested that color is best studied via experience, underpinned by experimentation and observation. The very rare first edition has a limited printing of only 2,000 copies and contained 150 silk screen plates. This work has since been republished, and is now available as an iPad App.

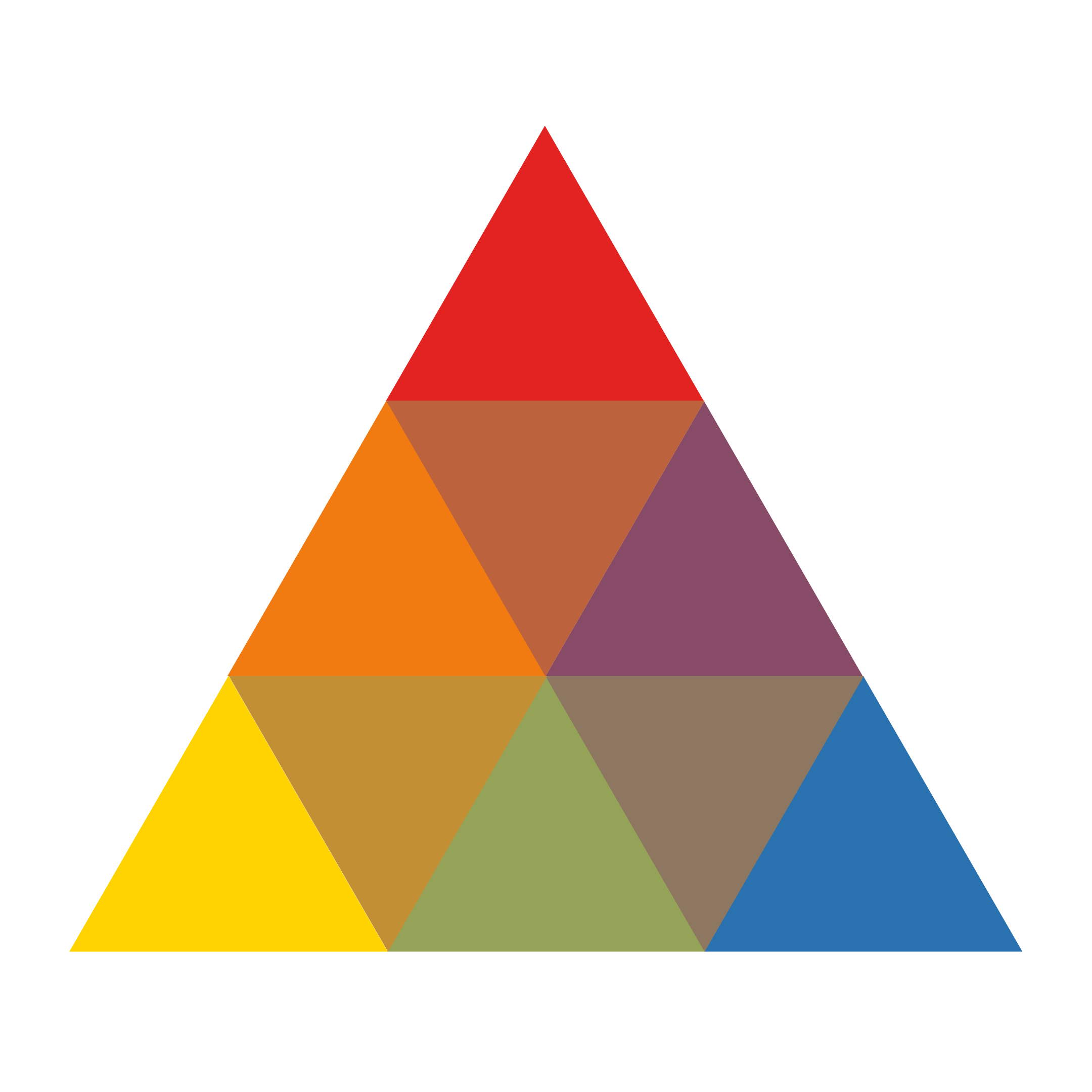
Color model representing Albers's color theory as described in Interaction of Color (1963)

Albers presented color systems at the end of his courses (and at the end of 'Interaction of Color') and these featured descriptions of primary, secondary and tertiary color, as well as a range of connotations that he assigned to specific colors on his triangular color model.

In respect to his artworks, Albers was known to meticulously list the specific manufacturer's colours and varnishes he used on the back of his works, as if the colours were catalogued components of an optical experiment. His work represents a transition between traditional European art and the new American art. It incorporated European influences from the Constructivists and the Bauhaus movement, and its intensity and smallness of scale were typically European, but his influence fell heavily on American artists of the late 1950s and the 1960s. "Hard-edge" abstract painters drew on his use of patterns and intense colors, while Op artists and conceptual artists further explored his interest in perception.

In an article about the artist, published in 1950, Elaine de Kooning concluded that however impersonal his paintings might at first appear, not one of them "could have been painted by any one but Josef Albers himself".

== Teaching and influence ==
Although Albers prioritized teaching his students principles of color interaction, he was admired by many of his students for instilling a general approach to all materials and means of engaging it in design. Albers "put practice before theory and prioritised experience; 'what counts,' he claimed 'is not so-called knowledge of so-called facts, but vision – seeing.' His focus was process." Although their relationship was often tense, and sometimes, even combative, Robert Rauschenberg later identified Albers as his most important teacher. Albers is considered to be one of the most influential teachers of visual art in the twentieth century.

=== Noted students of Albers ===
- Richard Anuszkiewicz (painter)
- Ruth Asawa (sculptor)
- Peter Beard (photographer, collage artist)
- Varujan Boghosian (collage artist and sculptor)
- Norman Carlberg (sculptor, educator)
- Jane Davis Doggett (graphic designer)
- Robert Engman (sculptor)
- Erwin Hauer (sculptor)
- Eva Hesse (sculptor)
- A. B. Jackson (painter)
- Robert L. Levers, Jr. (1930–1992; painter, Professor of Fine Arts, University of Texas, Austin)
- Ronald Markman (painter and sculptor)
- Victor Moscoso (graphic artist)
- Charles O. Perry (sculptor)
- Irving Petlin (painter)
- Joseph Raffael (painter)
- Robert Rauschenberg (painter and sculptor)
- Robert Reed (painter, educator)
- William Reimann (sculptor, educator)
- Irwin Rubin (construction and collage artist, educator)
- Stephanie Scuris (sculptor, educator)
- Arieh Sharon (architect)
- Harry Seidler (architect)
- Richard Serra (sculptor)
- Sewell Sillman (painter, educator)
- Robert Slutzky (1929–2005) painter, teacher of painting and architecture
- Julian Stanczak (painter)
- Theo Stavropoulos (painter, 1930–2007)
- Cora Kelley Ward (painter)
- Neil Welliver (painter)
- Vera Williams (children's writer and illustrator)

== Quotes of the artist ==
– "Every perception of colour is an illusion.. ..we do not see colors as they really are. In our perception they alter one another." [c. 1949, when Albers started his first Homage to the Square paintings]
– "THE ORIGIN OF ART: The discrepancy between physical fact and psychic effect. THE CONTENT OF ART: Visual information of our reaction to life. THE MEASURE OF ART: The ratio of effort to effect. THE AIM OF ART: Revelation and evocation of vision." [1964, from his text "Homage to the square"]
– "For me, abstraction is real, probably more real than nature. I'll go further and say that abstraction is nearer my heart. I prefer to see with closed eyes." [1966]
– "Art is not to be looked at. Art is looking at us.. .To be able to perceive it we need to be receptive. Therefore art is there where art meets us now. The content of art is visual formulation of our relation to life. The measure of art, the ratio of effort to effect, the aim of art revelation and evocation of vision. [1968, in oral history interview with Josef Albers]
– "I made true the first English sentence [Albers came from Germany] that I uttered (better stuttered) on our arrival at Black Mountain College in November 1933. When a student asked me what I was going to teach I said: 'to open eyes'. And this has become the motto of all my teaching." [1970, in 'A conversation with Josef Albers']

== Exhibitions (not a complete list) ==
=== Solo ===
- In 1936, Albers was given his first solo show in Manhattan at J. B. Neumann's New Art Circle.
- The Graphic Constructions of Josef Albers (December 8, 1969 – February 24, 1970) MOMA, New York
- Josef Albers at The Metropolitan Museum of Art: An Exhibition of His Paintings and Prints (November 19, 1971 – January 11, 1972) Metropolitan Museum of Art in Manhattan.

=== Group ===
- documenta I (1955) and documenta IV (1968) in Kassel.
- The Responsive Eye (1965) A major Albers exhibition, organized by the Museum of Modern Art, traveled in South America, Mexico, and the United States from 1965 to 1967.

=== Posthumous ===
- Josef Albers, 1888–1976 (Mar 26 – April 19, 1976) MoMa, New York
- The photographs of Josef Albers: a selection from the collection of the Josef Albers Foundation (Jan 27 – April 19, 1988) MoMa, New York
- Painting on paper – Josef Albers in America (2010) Pinakothek der Moderne, Munich; Centre Pompidou, Paris, and The Morgan Library & Museum, Manhattan. 80 oil works on paper, many never previously exhibited.
- Josef Albers (2011) Palazzina dei Giardini, Modena, Italy
- Albers and Heirs: Josef Albers, Neil Welliver, and Jane Davis Doggett (2014) Elliott Museum, Florida
- Josef Albers. Minimal Means, Maximum Effect (March 28 – July 6, 2014) Fundación Juan March, Madrid Spain
- Josef Albers: Process and Printmaking (1916-1976), (2 April – 28 June 2014) Museu Fundación Juan March, Palma, (9 July – 5 October 2014) Museo de Arte Abstracto Español, Cuenca
- One and One Is Four: The Bauhaus Photocollages of Josef Albers (November 23, 2016 – April 2, 2017) MoMa, New York
- Josef Albers in Mexico (November 3, 2017 – April 4, 2018) Guggenheim Museum, New York
- Albers and Morandi: Never Finished: works by Josef Albers and Giorgio Morandi (2021) David Zwirner Gallery, New York

== Legacy ==
The Josef Albers papers, documents from 1929 to 1970, were donated by the artist to the Smithsonian Institution's Archives of American Art in 1969 and 1970. In 1971 (nearly five years before his death), Albers founded the Josef and Anni Albers Foundation, a nonprofit organization he hoped would further "the revelation and evocation of vision through art". Today, this organization serves as the office for the estates of both Josef Albers and his wife Anni Albers, and supports exhibitions and publications focused on the works of both artists. The foundation building is located in Bethany, Connecticut, and "includes a central research and archival storage center to accommodate the Foundation's art collections, library and archives, and offices, as well as residence studios for visiting artists." A second, and substantial, part of the Josef Albers estate is held by the Josef Albers Museum in Bottrop, Germany, where he was born. Both institutions continue active outreach to secure the artist's reputation.

The Josef and Anni Albers Foundation offers three residency programs in three different parts of the world. They are located in Bethany, Connecticut; Carraig-na-gCat, Ireland; and Thread, Senegal. Residencies usually last between one and two months.

In 2019, his "colossal" mural, Manhattan, was reinstalled at the Walter Gropius-designed 200 Park Avenue (Metlife) Building, New York, following an almost two decade absence. "While we appreciate its importance in the art community, it just doesn't work for us anymore," a Metlife representative is quoted as saying, at the time of its removal (2000). Two decades later, the piece is once again being hailed as the vibrant centerpiece of the building, with the Albers Foundation's director on hand for the rededication of the work: "This is what art was for him: something that could affect you, maybe gave a little bit of joy to the lives of those people rushing to their trains or rushing out of the station to their workday."

== Criticism ==
Josef Albers's book Interaction of Color continues to be influential despite criticisms that arose following his death. In 1981, Alan Lee attempted to refute Albers's general claims about colour experience (that colour deceives continually) and to posit that Albers's system of perceptual education was fundamentally misleading.

Lee examined four topics in Albers's account of colour critically: In additive and subtractive colour mixture; the tonal relations of colours; the Weber-Fechner Law; and simultaneous contrast. In each case Lee suggested that Albers made fundamental errors with serious consequences for his claims about colour and his pedagogical method. Lee suggested that Albers's belief in the importance of colour deception was related to a misconception about aesthetic appreciation (that it depends upon some kind of confusion about visual perception). Lee suggested that the scientific colour hypothesis of Edwin H. Land should be considered in lieu of the concepts put forward by Albers. Finally, Lee called for a reassessment of Albers's art as necessary, following successful challenge to the foundational colour concepts that were the basis of his corpus.

Dorothea Jameson has challenged Lee's criticism of Albers, arguing that Albers's approach toward painting and pedagogy emphasized artists' experiences in the handling and mixing of pigments, which often have different results than predicted by color theory experiments with projected light or spinning color disks. Furthermore, Jameson explains that Lee's own understanding of additive and subtractive color mixtures is flawed.

== Value on the art market ==
Several paintings in Albers's series Homage to the Square have outsold their estimates, including Homage to the Square: Joy (1964) which sold for $1.5 million (nearly double its estimate) at a 2007 sale at Sotheby's. In 2015, Study for Homage to the Square, R-III E.B. (1970) sold for £785,000 (well above the estimated £350,000–450,000), at "the high point of an active market."

Albers, a prolific artist, has numerous prints and drawings available outside of the museums where his work is represented.

The Albers Foundation, the main beneficiary of the estates of both Josef and Anni Albers, remains protective of the artist's work and reputation. In 1997, one year after the auction house, Sotheby's, bought the Andre Emmerich Gallery, the Josef and Anni Albers Foundation did not renew its three-year contract with the gallery. The Foundation has also been instrumental in exposing fakes.

== See also ==
- Bauhaus
- Architype Albers (large typeface based on Albers's 1927–1931 experimentation with geometrically constructed stencil types for posters and signs)
- Category:Albums with cover art by Josef Albers
