= Homage to the Square =

Painting series by Josef Albers

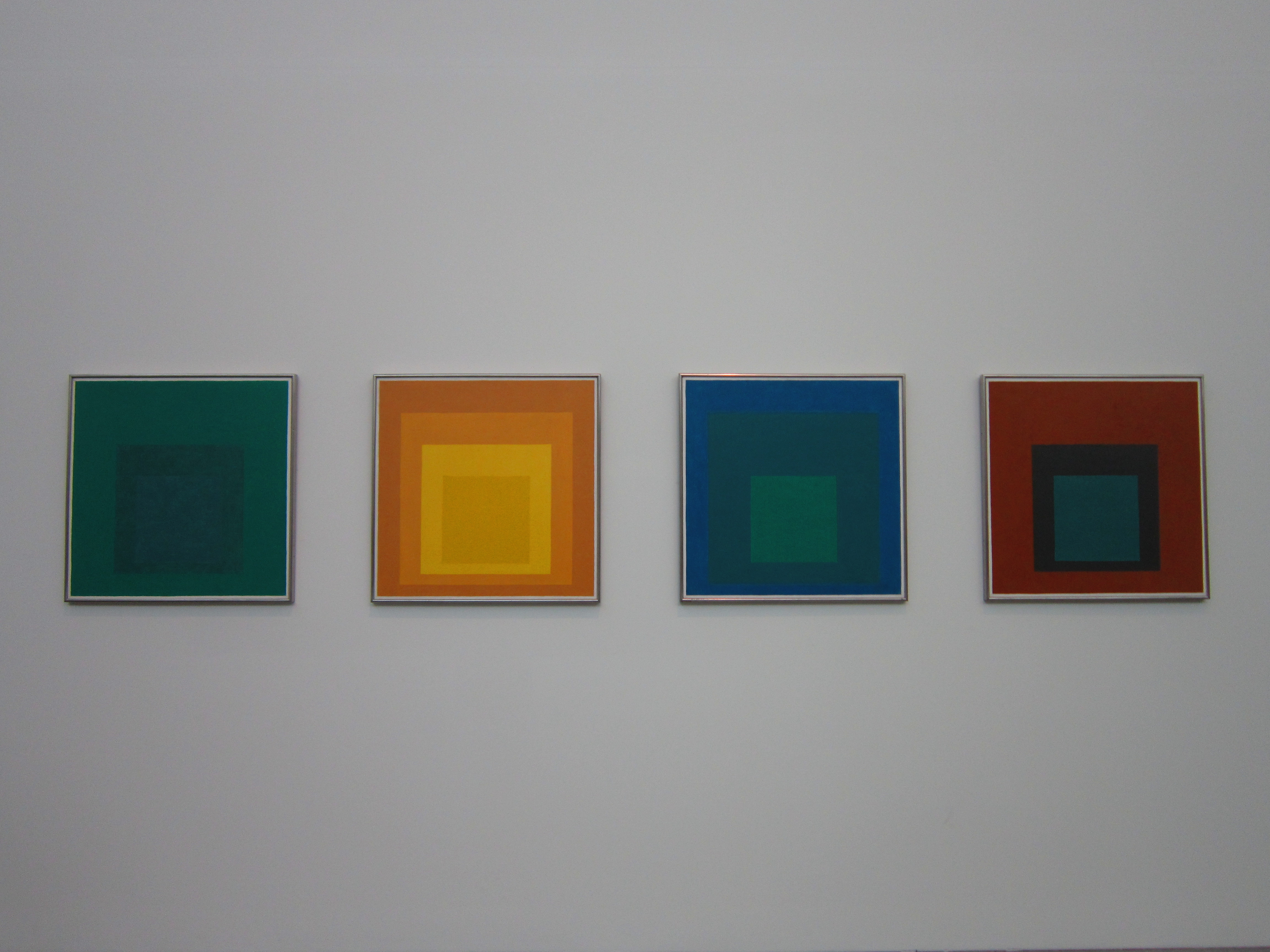
- Artist: Josef Albers

Homage to the Square is the title of a series of paintings produced by Josef Albers between 1950 and his death in 1976. In 1971, the paintings were the subject of the first solo show devoted to a living artist at the Metropolitan Museum of Art. There are over 1000 works within the series. Albers used this series as a color study, to show the differences in how color behaves when painted in a pure form.

Homage to the Square is heavily influenced by Albers' theories of art and his experiments with nontraditional techniques and art materials. The Homage to the Square series focuses on geometrically based abstraction, stemming from his time at the Bauhaus.

== Description ==
All of the paintings in the series show either three or four nested squares of color. The position of the interior squares is determined by a regular schema, with the margin below the square being smaller than the space above it. The works range in size from 406 x 406 mm to 1.22 x 1.22 meters.

Every piece of Homage to the Square lists the materials used within its production on the back of the panel. This has given scholars a greater understanding of the specific characteristics of each painting.

== Process of creation ==
Albers created the works under carefully controlled conditions to ensure uniformity across the series. He always painted the works on the rough side of Masonite panels. The panels were always covered with at least six coats of a white primer. Albers also controlled the lighting in the studio using fluorescent lights, which he arranged above his work table according to different patterns of light temperature.

In addition to specificities of lighting and primer, Albers maintained a repetitive and methodical process in his creation of Homage to the Square. He used unmixed paint directly from the tube, applying it with his palette knife, generally beginning work on the central square and moving out toward the edge of the panel. This process, working from the inside out, is due to his father, a house painter, who recommended this process so paint would not drip. The palette knife provided a distinctive texture to the painting.

Albers used paint directly from the tube in order to show the differences in pure color. This allowed Albers to show how the same colors from different brands could perform differently. Albers would then paint over the squares using varnish, which would again provide insight into how different materials change the color of the squares. To maintain the purity of the color of the squares, Albers would often paint over the varnish. This led to various issues with later conservation attempts.

== Albers's theories ==
=== Repetition ===
The repetitive nature of Homage to the Square is related to Albers's belief that "there is no end to color." The repetitive form allowed Albers to change one element of the piece in order to see how it impacted the greater artwork. This was done in order to see the psychic effects of color and form.

The repetitive use of squares, lines, and shapes focus on the form of the painting. This was done to highlight the role of form and its direct influence on color. For Albers, form required a repeated performance, which also trains the eye for both color and form.

=== Color ===
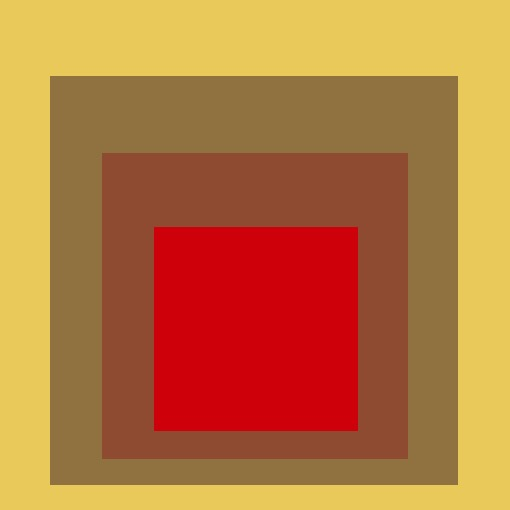
Josef Albers, Homage to the Square

Albers used his paintings in order to explore the relationship of colors. He placed the colors of the squares right next to each other in order to show how juxtaposition and contrast affected the appearance of color. In fact, various iterations of Homage to the Square used the same colors in different orders, in order to show the greater effects of juxtaposition. His goal was to see how the colors reacted together, claiming that he wanted to "let the colors react in the prison in which [he] put them." This juxtaposition was used to create different viewing experiences, such as one shade making another seem either lighter or darker. One example of the effect of the juxtaposition of the squares was the dimension it forced upon the paintings. Certain combinations of colors would create the effect of making squares seem like they are coming outward instead of inward.

Often Albers would use color in relation to moral character, which he explored through his Homage to the Square series. Albers believed that colors took on moral character because they existed "in relation to others," making color both an individual and a member of society. This exemplified his belief that ethics and aesthetics were one and the same. This idea of color was directly influenced by Johann Wolfgang von Goethe and his theories of vision and color. Inspired by Goethe's understanding of vision as being shaped by color and proximity, Albers distinguished between "ocular seeing" and "vision."

=== Form ===
Albers focused his pieces on the form of squares, claiming that he would make squares as long as he was able. The quasi-concentric order of the squares is the same in each version of the Homage, allowing the squares to be seen as singular entities or as a whole group. This allows for both distance and separation in unique ways. Additionally, the squares acted as a vessel of color. Albers chose to use squares because they do not appear in nature, making the paintings seem man-made to the human eye. Albers also claimed that squares "sit," which allows the color within the works to be highlighted. These squares were also given a white frame, in order to provide both a beginning and an end to the works of art.

== Conservation efforts and reproductions ==
Albers's unique process in creating Homage to the Square has led to various issues in the conservation efforts of the series. Because Albers sometimes painted over varnish layers, severe alligator cracking has occurred. Conservators have attempted to use in-painting in order to preserve the works. Additionally, conservators sometimes struggle to match the historical colors in the paintings to modern colors. This has led conservators to mix dry pigments in order to replicate the high intensity colors.

Reproductions often fail to capture the surface qualities of the paintings. In particular, the use of the palette knife added distinct texture and marks on the pieces, which are often lost in reproductions.

== Impact ==
The series inspired future abstract artists such as Bridget Riley, Peter Halley, Donald Judd, and Robert Rauschenberg. It has also influenced many Op artists who focused on large scale illusions.

== Examples ==
Examples of paintings from the series include:

- Homage to the Square: Ascending (1953), Whitney Museum
- Homage to the Square: Soft Spoken (1969), Metropolitan Museum of Art
- Homage to the Square I-Sa (1968), Dallas Museum of Art
- Homage to the Square: Apparition (1959), Solomon R. Guggenheim Museum, New York
- Homage to the Square: Moonstone (1962), Hyde Collection
- Study for Homage to the Square (1964), Tate Modern
