= Jane Davis Doggett =

American artist (1929–2023)

- Born: November 4, 1929; Nashville, Tennessee, U.S.
- Died: April 10, 2023 (aged 93); Sun City Center, Florida, U.S.
- Education: Sophie Newcomb College, New Orleans, LA, 1952; Yale School of Graphic Design
- Known for: Graphic Design, Wayfinding
- Movement: Modernist
- Website: http://www.jddinc.com/

Jane Davis Doggett (November 4, 1929 – April 10, 2023) was an American graphic artist and pioneer designer of wayfinding and graphics systems for airports.

== Early life ==
Jane Davis Doggett was born on November 4, 1929, in Morristown, Tennessee, to Annie Kate (née Weesner) a homemaker and piano player and Robert Doggett, a paving contractor, asphalt wholesaler and horse breeder. Doggett grew up in Nashville, Tennessee. She graduated from Sophie Newcomb College (Tulane University, New Orleans, LA) in 1952 and Yale University School of Art and Architecture in 1956 with an MFA in graphics, where she worked under noted colorist Josef Albers, who had recently been appointed Head of Yale's Graphic Design department. "As an early student of Josef Albers, she took his famed Interaction of Color course and absorbed Albers’ inspired principles of color perception while establishing her own strong artistic identity."

Her first job after graduate school was with George Nelson, working on the anthropological elements of the permanent exhibit at Colonial Williamsburg, Virginia. She then worked in Europe for the magazine Architectural Record, photographing architects and engineers and their work.

== Career ==
=== Airport Graphics and Wayfinding ===
Her first airport design job was for the Memphis airport in 1959. The project's architect, Roy Harrover, knew Doggett from both Nashville and Yale and brought her in to do the graphics.

In the late 1950s, the advent of the jet was changing air travel, requiring multiple terminals and increasing the number of people moving through them. The newer, larger airports could no longer accommodate the "hodgepodge" of airline logos without some sort of overarching graphic order, and the increasing architectural complexity of airport design necessitated fresh design thinking.

Doggett would end up supplying more than graphics, innovating standardizations and coherent color categorizations that would revolutionize passenger navigation within public spaces. "The field she began working in didn't really have a name at the time but is now called environmental graphic design. She became one of its founding figures, coming up with systems to help people navigate complex spaces, a specialty called 'wayfinding.'"

Her first innovation was the development of a standardized font for use throughout the airport. At the time, each airport had their own logos and their own typefaces; Doggett proposed a universal/common typeface with logos and branding behind the ticket counter. This font became Doggett's trademarked “Alphabet A” and was used in many subsequent airport projects, since it was very readable over long distances.

Additional airport projects would include Tampa International, George Bush-Houston, Baltimore-Washington, Newark, Miami, Fort Lauderdale-Hollywood, and Cleveland-Hopkins among others.

By 2014, Doggett had designed the wayfinding systems for 40 major airport projects, which is said to be “more than any other designer in the world.” Each year, 20 million airplane passengers are guided by her way-finding signage and graphics.

=== Environmental Design ===
From the late 1950s and for decades thereafter, Doggett was one of a small number of women who found successful careers in environmental design. She established her own firm, Architectural Graphics Associates, based in Connecticut, just a few years after receiving her master's degree. In interviews throughout her working career, she was repeatedly queried if she had ever encountered challenges in her work because of her gender. Her answers were all in a similar vein: "''It's sort of like asking Henry Kissinger, 'Did you encounter obstacles working for détente?'''

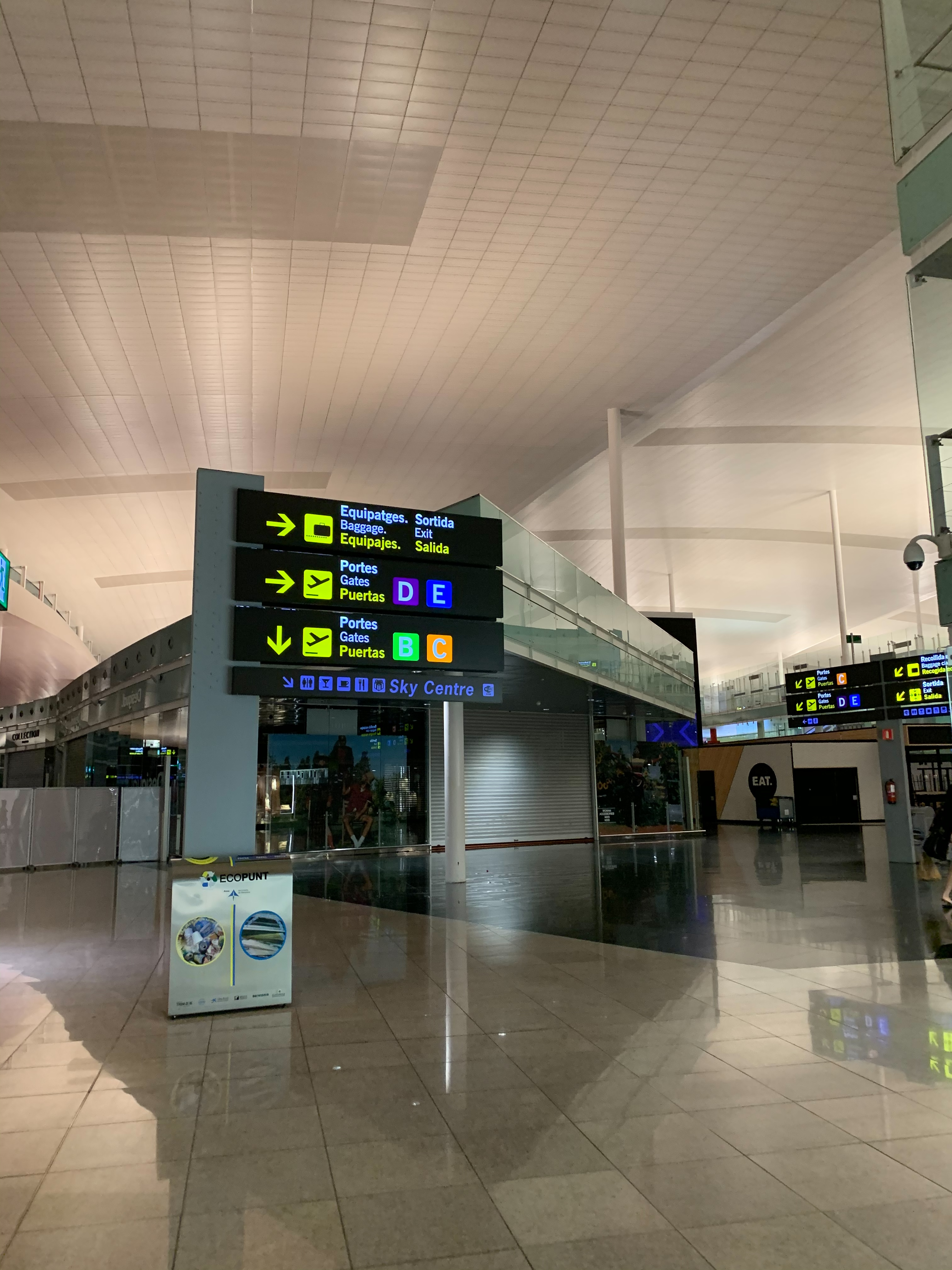
Airport Wayfinding Signage Example

== Wayfinding systems ==
Doggett is credited with four innovations that are now commonly employed in airports and other large public spaces:

- Use of color, letter, and symbol to guide visitors through large unfamiliar places.
- Designs that begin on highways outside the structure, simplifying and making the wayfinding process safer for drivers or other travelers while also reducing the number of signs needed. Doggett's system eliminated two-thirds of the highway signs that had originally been proposed for the Tampa airport.
- Building the verbal or symbolic message into the architecture rather than tacking it on as a sign.
- Creating a visual symbol to brand the airport and represent it as a gateway to the surrounding region.

== Further design work ==
Other notable graphics and design projects that she has worked on include Madison Square Garden, the Philadelphia subway system, the Whitney Museum of American Art, Niagara Falls International Convention Center, Jones Hall for the Performing Arts in Houston, and Fairfax Hospital in Virginia. Doggett's designs have been awarded the American Institute of Architects’ National Award of Merit, the Progressive Architecture Design Award, American Iron and Steel Institute's Design in Steel Citation, and two Design Awards co-sponsored by the U.S. Department of Transportation and the National Endowment for the Arts.

In her fine art work since 2007, Doggett developed the concept of the Iconochrome, which she described as “geometric designs in colors expressing philosophically profound messages.” She has also described an Iconochrome as a colorful image or “Icon, an image with meaning, plus chrome, color.” Her work has been exhibited at the Yale University Art Gallery; Tennessee State Museum, Nashville; Armory Art Center, West Palm Beach, FL; Tampa International Airport; Lighthouse Art Center, Tequesta, FL; Northern Trust, North Palm Beach, FL; Maritime and Classic Boat Museum, Jensen Beach, FL; Chapter Two, Corea, ME; College of the Atlantic, Bar Harbor, ME; Littlefield Gallery, Winter Harbor, ME; Elliott Museum, Stuart, FL.

== Later life and death ==
In her later years, Doggett focused on painting and fine art graphic works, objects she called "three dimensional graphics." She exhibited in a special showcase at her alma mater, Yale, and in galleries in Florida. "She explored using shapes and colors to interpret Roman proverbs and passages from the Bible. Using computers, she created landscapes out of graphic elements." She was inducted into the Florida Artists Hall of Fame in a ceremony on February 2, 2016, at the annual Convening Culture Conference in Fort Lauderdale.

Doggett was cared for by her nephew in her later years. She died in Sun City Center, Florida, on April 20, 2023, at the age of 93.

== Books ==
- Doggett, J. D. (2007). Talking Graphics: A Book of Iconochrome Images. Exartis Publishers.

== Awards ==
- AIA Graphics Award (inaugural)
- American Institute of Architects' National Award of Merit
- Progressive Architecture Design Award,
- American Iron and Steel Institute's Design in Steel Citation
- two Design Awards co-sponsored by the U.S. Department of Transportation and the National Endowment for the Arts.

== External Sources ==
2019 PBS documentary, ''Jane Davis Doggett: Wayfinder in the Jet Age''
