= MetLife Building =

Office skyscraper in Manhattan, New York

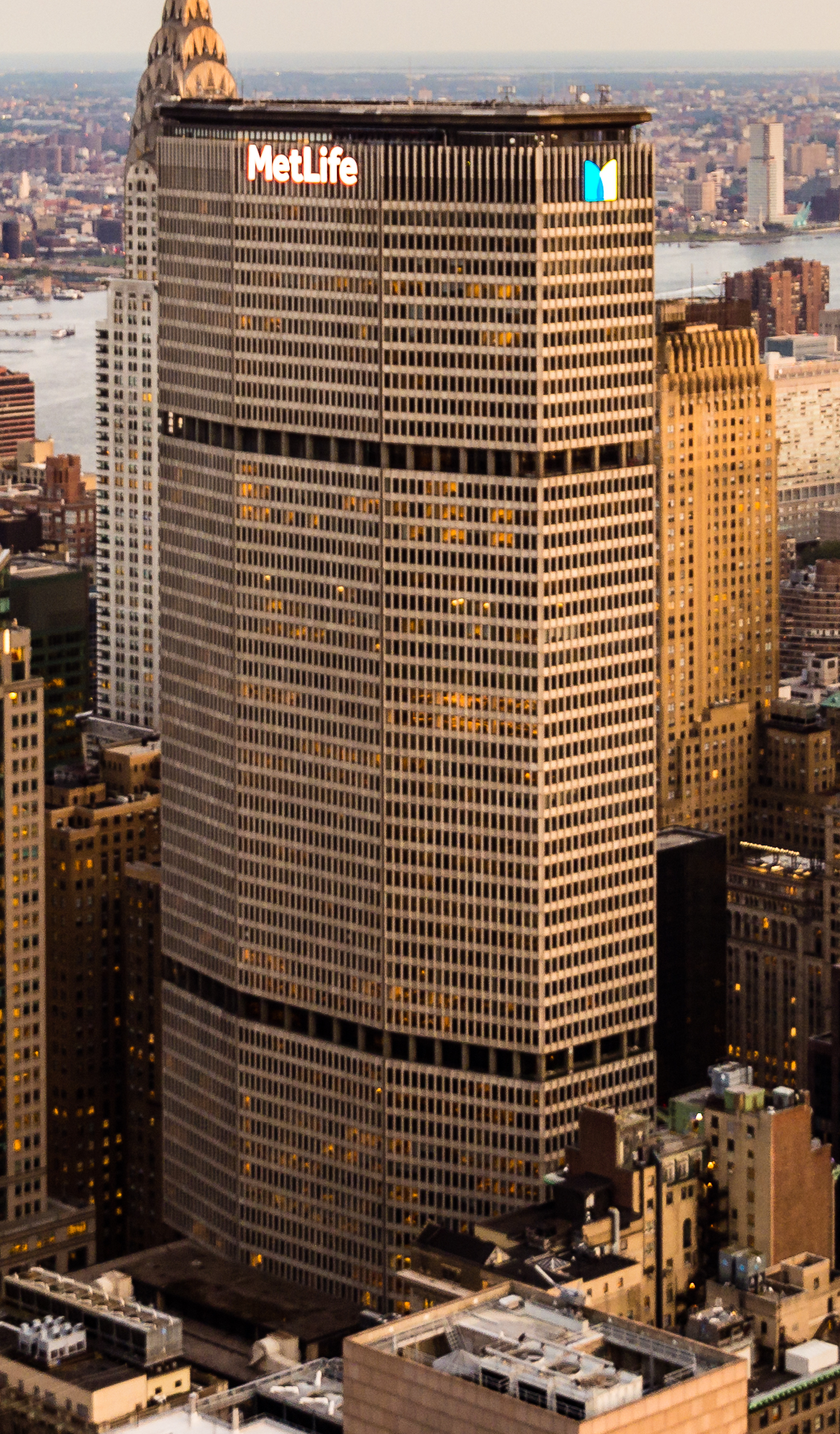
- Seen from 30 Rockefeller Plaza in September 2019
- Former names: Pan Am Building (1963–1993)

General information
- Type: Office
- Architectural style: International
- Location: 200 Park Avenue; Manhattan, New York 10166; U.S.
- Coordinates: 40°45′12″N 73°58′36″W
- Construction started: November 26, 1959
- Topped-out: May 9, 1962
- Completed: 1963
- Opening: March 7, 1963
- Owner: The Irvine Company

Height
- Roof: 808 ft (246.3 m)

Technical details
- Floor count: 59
- Floor area: 2,841,511 square feet (263,985.0 m^{2})
- Lifts/elevators: 85

Design and construction
- Architects: Emery Roth & Sons, Pietro Belluschi, and Walter Gropius
- Engineer: Jaros, Baum & Bolles (MEP)
- Structural engineer: James Ruderman

Website
- 200parkavenue.com

The MetLife Building (also 200 Park Avenue and formerly the Pan Am Building) is a skyscraper at Park Avenue and 45th Street, north of Grand Central Terminal, in the Midtown Manhattan neighborhood of New York City, New York, U.S. Designed in the International style by Richard Roth, Walter Gropius, and Pietro Belluschi and completed in 1962, the MetLife Building is 808 feet (246 m) tall with 59 stories. It was advertised as the world's largest commercial office space by square footage at its opening, with 2.4 million square feet (220,000 m^{2}) of usable office space. As of November 2022, the MetLife Building remains one of the 100 tallest buildings in the United States.

The MetLife Building contains an elongated octagonal massing with the longer axis perpendicular to Park Avenue. The building sits atop two levels of railroad tracks leading into Grand Central Terminal. The facade is one of the first precast concrete exterior walls in a building in New York City. In the lobby is a pedestrian passage to Grand Central's Main Concourse, a lobby with artwork, and a parking garage at the building's base. A rooftop heliport operated in the 1960s and briefly in 1977. The MetLife Building's design has been widely criticized since it was proposed, largely due to its location next to Grand Central Terminal.

A skyscraper on the site of Grand Central Terminal was first proposed in 1954 to raise money for the New York Central Railroad and New York, New Haven and Hartford Railroad, the financially struggling railroads that operated the terminal. Subsequently, plans were announced for what later became the MetLife Building, to be built behind the terminal rather than in place of it. Work on the project, initially known as Grand Central City, started in 1959 and the building was formally opened on March 7, 1963. At its opening, the building was named for Pan American World Airways, for which it served as headquarters. The Metropolitan Life Insurance Company (MetLife) bought the Pan Am Building in 1981 and used it as their headquarters before selling the building in 2005. The MetLife Building has been renovated several times, including in the mid-1980s, early 2000s, and late 2010s.

== Site ==
The MetLife Building is at 200 Park Avenue, between the two roadways of the Park Avenue Viaduct to the west and east, in the Midtown Manhattan neighborhood of New York City, New York, U.S. The building faces the Helmsley Building across 45th Street to the north and Grand Central Terminal to the south. Other nearby buildings include One Vanderbilt and 335 Madison Avenue to the southwest; the Yale Club of New York City clubhouse to the west; The Roosevelt Hotel to the northwest; 450 Lexington Avenue to the east; and the Graybar Building to the southeast. The building is assigned its own ZIP Code—10166—and is one of 41 such buildings in Manhattan, as of 2019.

In 1871, the New York Central Railroad built the Grand Central Depot, a ground-level depot at the intersection of Park Avenue and 42nd Street; it was succeeded in 1900 by Grand Central Station, also at ground level. The completion of Grand Central Terminal in 1913 resulted in the rapid development of the areas around Grand Central, which became known as Terminal City. The Grand Central Terminal complex included a six-story building for baggage handling just north of the main station building, on what is now the site of the MetLife Building. The baggage handling building was converted to an office building late in its history. The surrounding stretch of Park Avenue was developed with International Style skyscrapers during the 1950s and 1960s.

== Architecture ==
Designed in the International style by Richard Roth, Walter Gropius, and Pietro Belluschi, the MetLife Building was developed by Erwin S. Wolfson and completed in 1963 as the Pan Am Building. It is 808 feet (246 m) tall with 59 stories, containing both commercial and office space. As of September 2024, the MetLife Building is the 42nd-tallest building in New York City and 88th-tallest in the United States.

The Diesel Construction Company was the general contractor for the building; at the time of construction, Wolfson had owned that company. Numerous other engineers and contractors were involved in the building's construction, including Hideo Sasaki as site planning consultant and landscape architect; Jaros, Baum & Bolles as MEP engineers; and James Ruderman as structural engineer. From the beginning, the building was intended for large firms, with 2.4 million square feet (220,000 m^{2}) in office floor area. In total, it has 2,841,511 square feet (263,985.0 m^{2}) of gross floor area, according to The Skyscraper Center.

=== Form ===
The massing consists of a base and an octagonal tower. Contemporary sources describe the base as measuring nine stories tall, atop which rises 50 tower stories. However, the Council on Tall Buildings and Urban Habitat gives a conflicting measurement of 10 base stories and 49 tower stories. Exterior planted areas were planned for the sidewalks and above the roof of the base.

The tower stories' floor plates are designed in an elongated octagonal lozenge, with the longer axis running parallel to 45th Street. The north and south facades are divided into three broad segments, while the west and east facades are one segment each. The building's form may have been influenced by the 1961 Zoning Resolution, a major change to New York City zoning code that was proposed just before construction started. The massing is similar to Le Corbusier's unbuilt tower in Algiers, proposed between 1938 and 1942, as well as the nearly contemporary Pirelli Tower in Milan (completed in 1958). The architects intended for the octagonal shape and exterior curtain wall to reduce the building's perceived sense of scale.

=== Facade ===
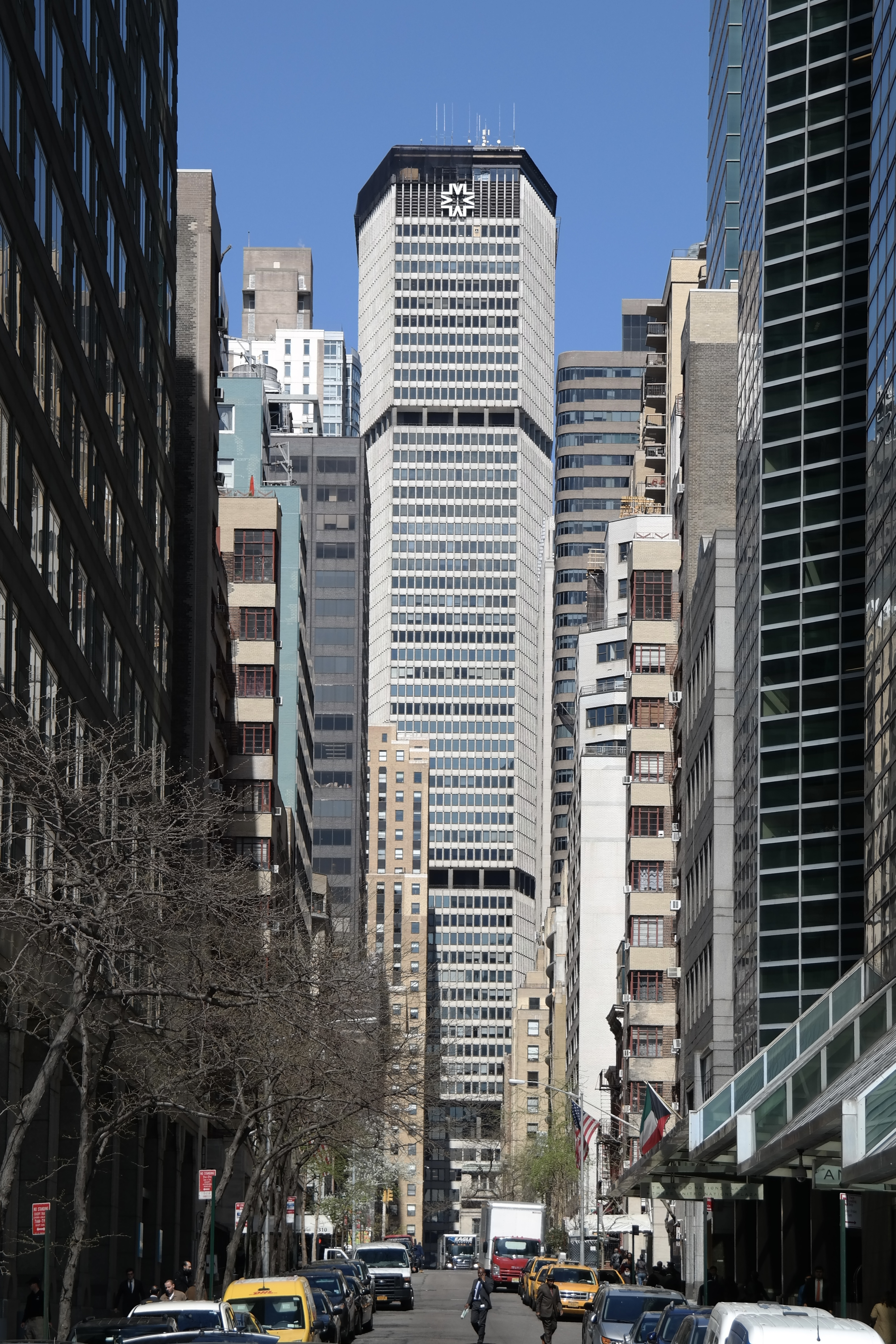
East facade from 44th Street

The facade of the first two stories and mezzanines is clad with granite, aluminum, marble, and stainless steel with glass windows. On Depew Place, an alley running below the eastern leg of the Park Avenue Viaduct, fifteen loading docks were constructed for trucks to conduct deliveries and loading. On the Vanderbilt Avenue side, a marquee was installed over the entrance in the 1980s. The third through seventh stories are exclusively sheathed in granite, with window inserts. The eighth and ninth floors, which are slightly set back, are clad in aluminum.

The 10th through 59th stories of the MetLife Building contain one of the first precast concrete exterior walls in a building in New York City. The building includes about nine thousand light-tan precast concrete Mo-Sai panels, each of which surrounds a window measuring 4 feet (1.2 m) wide by 8 feet (2.4 m) high. The panels themselves measure 6 feet (1.8 m) wide by 13.67 feet (4 m) high and weigh 3,500 pounds (1,600 kg) each. Each panel is coated with a quartz aggregate to give texture to the facade. Vertical concrete mullions project about 13 inches (330 mm) from the facade, separating the panels on every story. Flat concrete spandrels separate the windows between stories. Though Walter Gropius had considered a precast concrete facade to be more solid than a glass curtain wall, this only made the building appear bulkier. Furthermore, the appearance of concrete degraded over time; this effect could be seen in structures such as the Solomon R. Guggenheim Museum but was more pronounced on the MetLife Building's facade. During the building's construction, the manufacturer of the Mo-Sai panels declared bankruptcy, forcing Diesel Construction to buy out that company to prevent delays in construction.

The facade is recessed at the 21st and 46th stories, where there is mechanical space. These recesses create the impression of deep shadows. Both mechanical stories are surrounded by a colonnade of columns, which are spaced 16 feet (4.9 m) apart on centers. The precast concrete curtain wall is recessed behind the columns.

The MetLife Building originally bore 15-foot-tall (4.6 m) "Pan Am" displays on its north and south facades and 25-foot-tall (7.6 m) globe logos on the east and west facades. This was swapped with neon "MetLife" displays to the north and south in 1992. These displays were changed again in 2017, being replaced with LED letters to conserve energy. The Pan Am Building was the last tall tower erected in New York City before laws were enacted preventing corporate logos and names on the tops of buildings. Modern New York City building code prohibits logos from being more than 25 feet (7.6 m) above the curb or occupying over 200 square feet (19 m^{2}) on a blockfront. The sign replacements had been permitted because the city government considered the new signs to be an "uninterrupted continuation of a use" that was allowed before the zoning laws were changed.

=== Structural features ===
200 Park Avenue was built atop two levels of railroad tracks underground, which feed directly into Grand Central Terminal. The substructure of the building uses foundational columns that extend into the track levels, descending some 55 feet (17 m) below street level into the underlying bedrock. The substructure includes more than 300 columns, each 18.5 inches (470 mm) across and clad with 2 inches (51 mm) of concrete. Ninety-nine columns were built specifically for the Pan Am Building; these columns were installed within several inches of existing steel members such as third rails, but had to be isolated from the other steel. The new columns weighed between 22 and 44 short tons (20 and 39 long tons; 20 and 40 t). Approximately two hundred existing columns, which supported the former baggage building on the site, were reinforced. The work involved abridging the tops of many existing columns and installing horizontal beams weighing up to 36 short tons (32 long tons; 33 t). A "triple decker sandwich" made of lead, asbestos, and sheet steel was installed under each level of tracks to provide insulation.

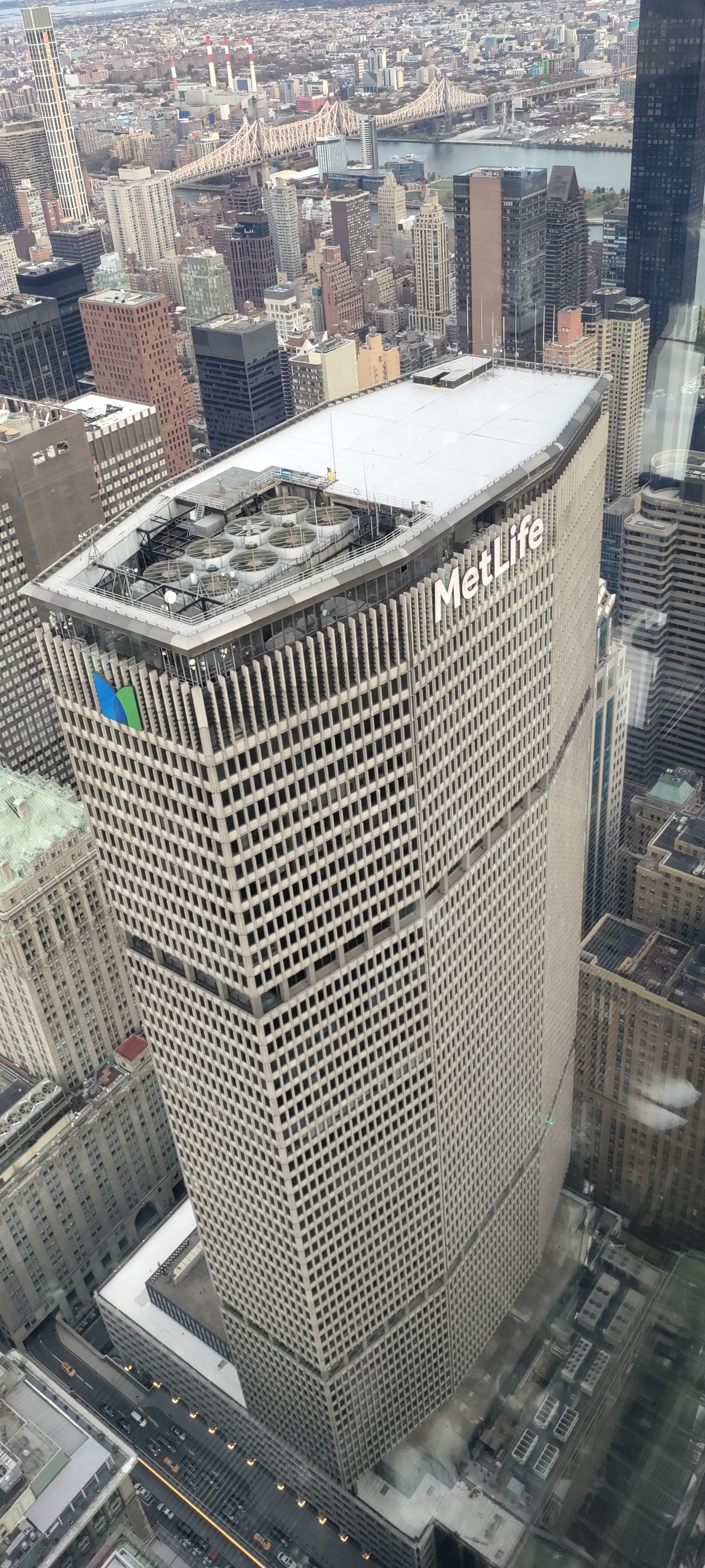
Rooftop view from One Vanderbilt

The superstructure was constructed similarly to bridge spans. To fabricate the floor slabs, builders used a process called composite action, in which concrete was bonded with structural steel panels to create a stronger structure. Steel panels were fabricated, rather than concrete floors, because steel panels were lighter and could be constructed regardless of unfavorable weather. Over 56 acres (230,000 m^{2}) of steel panels are used in the floor plates, each of which contains wire and cable ducts. A standard floor slab could handle loads of 50 pounds per square foot (240 kg/m^{2}). The building's steel frame weighs over 45,000 short tons (40,000 long tons; 41,000 t) in total. The roof of the building contains NOAA Weather Radio Station KWO35, a National Weather Service radio station. Since 1990, there has also been a peregrine falcon nest on the building's roof.

==== Helipad ====
The initial plans for the Pan Am Building were altered in March 1961 to provide for a helipad on the east side of the roof. The helipad garnered controversy immediately after it was announced, and opponents of the plan cited noise and safety concerns. The heliport's opening required approval from the Federal Aviation Administration (FAA), the city government, and the Port Authority of New York and New Jersey. Lawyers for the building's owners applied for permission to operate the heliport in August 1963, and the New York City Planning Commission confirmed in early 1964 that the owners had sought a permit for the heliport. The New York City Board of Estimate gave final approval to the heliport in January 1965, and test flights began that March, amid continued opposition to the heliport.

Helicopter service started on December 22, 1965. The service was operated by New York Airways, which flew Vertol 107 helicopters from the rooftop helipad to Pan Am's terminal at John F. Kennedy International Airport (JFK). There was a ticket office for the heliport at the base of the building. Passengers would check in at the ticket office, then take an express elevator to the 57th floor, an escalator to the heliport lounge, then another elevator to the roof. The flight to JFK lasted an average of six minutes and twenty seconds. The New York City government renewed the heliport's operating license in 1966, despite continued opposition to the heliport. For a short period starting in March 1967, the company also offered service to Teterboro Airport. All helicopter service stopped on February 18, 1968, because of insufficient ridership, as well as disagreements over funding.

Though discussions to restart helicopter service were held in 1969, approval was not given until early 1977. Service to JFK resumed that February using Sikorsky S-61s. On May 16, 1977, about one minute after an S-61L landed and its 20 passengers disembarked, the right front landing gear collapsed, causing the aircraft to topple onto its side with the rotors still turning. One of the blades detached, killing four men who were waiting to board and a fifth person at ground level; two other people were seriously injured. Helicopter service was suspended that day and never resumed. The already-controversial building received further negative attention as a result of the incident, and both New York Airways and Pan Am suffered financially in subsequent years. During its short periods of operation, the heliport was largely perceived as a nuisance and danger, but its presence was also seen as satisfying what David W. Dunlap described as "the consummate technological fantasy of airborne travel through skyscraping pinnacles".

=== Interior ===
==== Structural and mechanical features ====
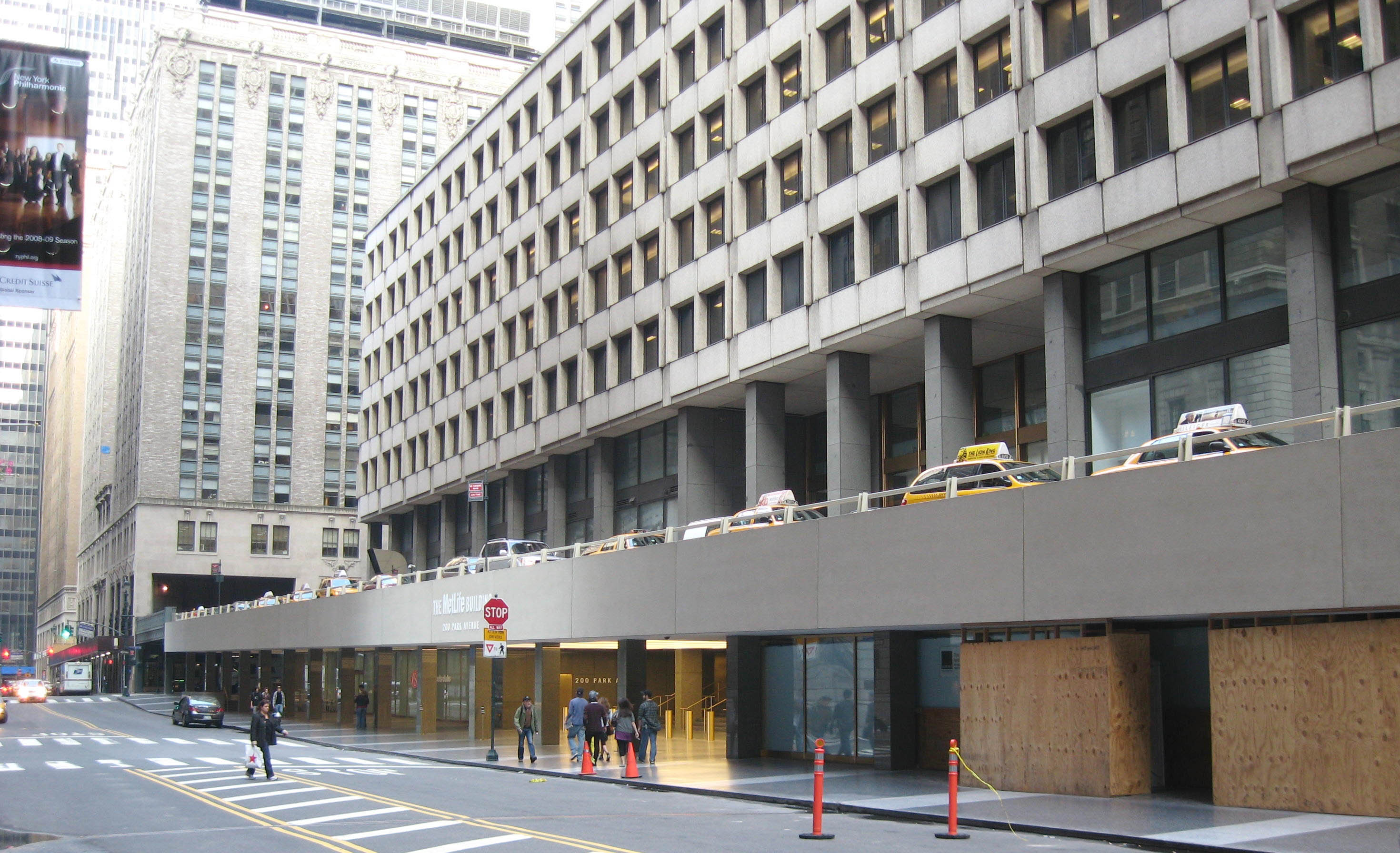
Vanderbilt Avenue entrance arcade

A central telephone office was installed on the 20th and 21st stories, serving 30,000 telephones within the building. The system, costing $11 million, was the first of its kind in an office building in the United States. The central office, operated by New York Telephone, eliminated the need for tenants to have individual telephone offices and equipment rooms. To avoid interfering with the subterranean railroad tracks, the telephone conduits were routed through the roof of the railroad tunnel. On the two floors where the telephone office was installed, the floor slabs were strengthened to handle loads of 150 to 300 pounds per square foot (730 to 1,460 kg/m^{2}), and floor heights were increased to provide clearance of at least 13.5 feet (4.1 m).

A refrigeration plant, described at the time of construction as the world's largest such plant, was installed on the roof with three steam-powered units each weighing 100 short tons (91 t). The plant was placed on the roof because the building has no usable basement, as all the subterranean space is part of Grand Central Terminal. The plant had a cooling capacity of 10,000 refrigeration tons (35 MW) and could use 200,000 pounds of steam every hour. Large fan rooms were placed on the mechanical stories at the 21st and 46th floors, dispersing air to the other floors, and two individual air supply systems were placed on each story. The ventilation systems could deliver 5,000,000 cubic feet (140,000 m^{3}) every minute. The pipes and ducts had to serve all the building's floors, with an electrical system and water pressure system capable of serving all the building's stories. At ground level was a room where wastepaper could be "baled" on-site to make easier to dispose of paper.

Westinghouse Electric Corporation also manufactured 65 elevators and 21 escalators for 200 Park Avenue, which at the time of construction was the largest-ever order for elevators. One bank of six elevators was able to travel 1,600 feet per minute (490 m/min), the fastest elevators in the world at the time of their installation. Five elevators were reserved for freight. The elevators rise from the second-story lobby because the elevator pits could not descend below the first story due to the presence of the tracks. The upper stories were served by 59 elevators. According to the Skyscraper Center, as of 2021, the building has 85 elevators.

==== Lobby ====
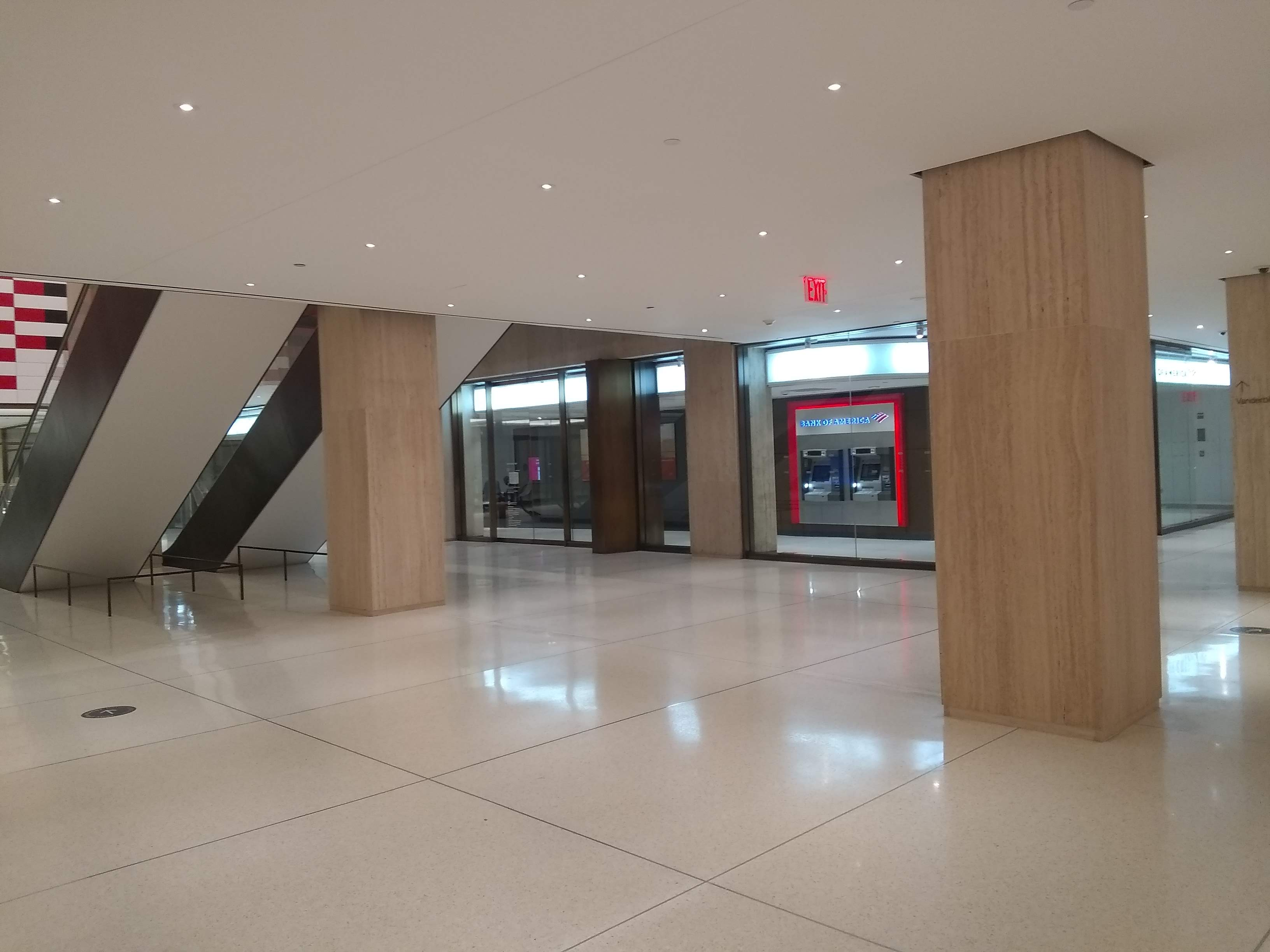
Southern end of the lobby

The MetLife Building's base contains a lobby across its lowest two stories. At ground level is a 76-foot-wide (23 m) pedestrian passageway, enabling traffic flow between the Helmsley Building's pedestrian arcades and Grand Central Terminal. The 45th Street entrance to the passageway is set back 65 feet (20 m) from the sidewalk. A 103-foot-wide (31 m) entrance arcade is placed on Vanderbilt Avenue, with the doorways set about 81 feet (25 m) back from the sidewalk there. The building's main office lobby is placed at the second story, at the level of the viaduct. The lobby was also designed with plantings and a 40-foot-high (12 m) enclosed plaza. The lobby contains 18 escalators in total. Four escalators lead to the Main Concourse at the southern end of the passageway, while fourteen more lead from the passageway to the office lobby.

Gropius was responsible for the original design of the lobby, which was largely austere. The building's original anchor tenant, Pan Am, had a ticket office under a 25-foot-wide (7.6 m) niche off the main lobby, measuring 135 feet (41 m) long and 11 feet (3.4 m) high, with circular counters and a wall with a relief map of the world. It was the world's largest airline ticket office at the time of its opening, covering 10,000 square feet (930 m^{2}).

===== Renovations =====
During a 1980s renovation by Warren Platner, some 15,000 square feet (1,400 m^{2}) of retail space were constructed in the lobby. Also installed was a staircase at the center of the lobby on 45th Street, which consisted of alternating travertine and gray-granite risers. The staircase ranged from 10 feet (3.0 m) wide at the ground floor to 20 feet (6.1 m) at an intermediate landing, where it split into two flights and reached a width of 30 feet (9.1 m) at the mezzanine. There were four triangular planters at the bottom of the staircase, which complemented an orange carpet with flower motifs at the mezzanine. The lobby also contained unusual semicircular discs that were either mounted atop poles or suspended from the ceiling. In addition, a security desk was added and the storefronts were expanded.

In an early-2000s renovation by Kohn Pedersen Fox, the lobby received tile and black travertine floors, the storefronts were moved to the side, and the central staircase was removed. The storefronts were removed in the late 2010s, when the lobby was re-clad in light-colored travertine. The renovated lobby has an oak-floored reception lounge overlooking the entrance.

===== Artwork =====
The Pan Am Building's lobby was planned with several works of art, which comprised most of the original lobby's decoration. One such artwork is Flight, a triple-story wire sculpture by Richard Lippold. The sculpture contains a sphere, representing the earth; a seven-pointed star, representing the seven continents and seas; and gold wires representing aircraft flight patterns. It measures 80 feet (24 m) wide, and 40 feet (12 m) deep. The composer John Cage, a friend of Lippold's, had initially proposed a musical program to complement Flight, consisting of ten loudspeakers, which would have played works by Muzak whenever people walked in and out of the lobby. Lippold canceled the idea and management instead agreed to play classical music in the lobby.

At the Pan Am Building's opening, the entrance from the Main Concourse was topped by Manhattan, a 28-by-55-foot (8.5 by 16.8 m) mosaic mural of red, white, and black panels by Josef Albers. That work was removed in a 2001 renovation, though Albers had left exact specifications for reproducing the work, and a replica was installed in 2019.

Suspended over the 45th Street entrance was a mural by György Kepes, consisting of two aluminum screens with concentric squares. Kepes's mural measured 40 feet (12 m) wide and was placed on the balcony until it was removed in the 1980s. At Vanderbilt Avenue, Robert Berks sculpted a bronze bust depicting the building's developer, Erwin S. Wolfson.

==== Other interior spaces ====
The MetLife Building was designed with a six-level parking garage with room for 400 cars. The garage contains entrances and exits from both roadways of the Park Avenue Viaduct. According to former minority owner Tishman Speyer, as of 2021, the building's garage contains 248 spots across four levels. (Note: However, according to The Skyscraper Center, there are 315 parking spaces.)

A variety of commercial and office spaces were included in the Pan Am Building when it opened. Pan Am, the airline for which the building was originally named, contained a ticketing office at 45th Street and Vanderbilt Avenue, similar in design to Eero Saarinen's TWA Flight Center at JFK Airport. Office stories in the octagonal slab typically have between 32,000 to 36,000 square feet (3,000 to 3,300 m^{2}) of usable space, with elevators and stairs at the center, as well as uneven column spacing. This arrangement allows a large amount of window-office space for tenants, as each story contains 780 feet (240 m) of outer perimeter walls. Different companies with full-floor leases designed their spaces in various manners. Some tenants placed private offices along the perimeter, with important executive offices at the far corners of the story. Other tenants placed open spaces at the west and east ends of the floor or in the center.

The Sky Club, a private luncheon club, had been on the 56th floor of the Pan Am Building. For several years the Sky Club had contained a private restaurant. Aircraft pioneer Juan Trippe, founder of Pan Am, was a member of this club. Trippe had commissioned a mural of clipper ships for the walls of the Sky Club; it was sent to Tucker's Point resort in Bermuda after the club shuttered. On the 57th and 58th stories was the Copter Club, which was used by passengers of the short-lived helicopter service.

== History ==
=== Planning ===
By the 1950s, passenger volumes at Grand Central Terminal had declined dramatically from the early 20th century, and there were proposals to demolish and replace the station. The New York Central Railroad was losing money, partially on paying taxes on the building's air rights. New York Central wanted to sell the property or its air rights to allow the construction of a skyscraper above or on the terminal's site. At the same time, the New York, New Haven and Hartford Railroad retained a partial interest in the terminal's operation.

==== Early plans ====
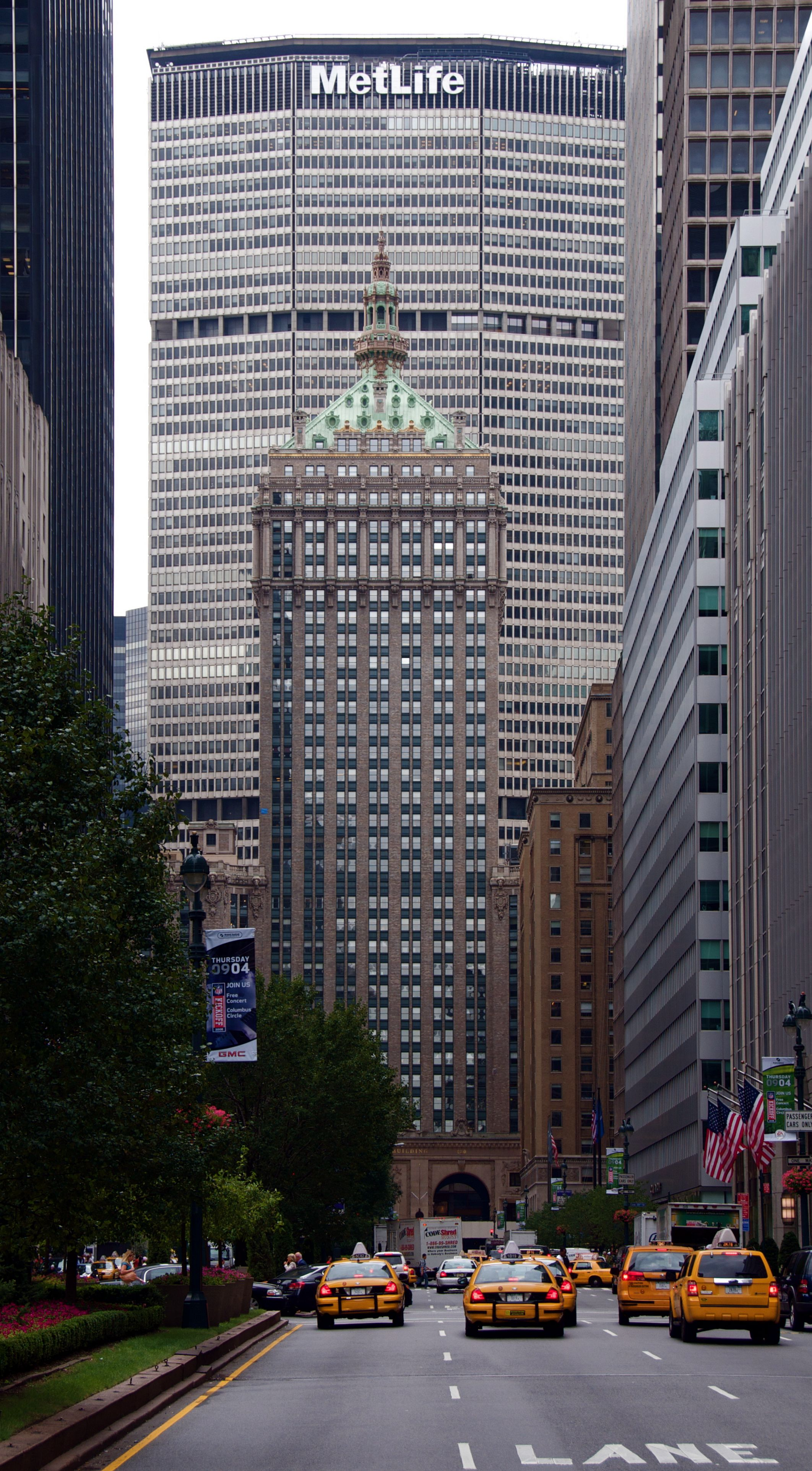
View from the north, with the New York Central Building (now Helmsley Building) in front

Initially, New York Central's chairman Robert R. Young had been negotiating with developer Erwin S. Wolfson and their mutual friends Herbert and Stuart Scheftel to determine how the Grand Central site could be redeveloped. After these discussions broke down, two competing plans for the replacement of Grand Central Terminal were proposed in 1954. One design, by I. M. Pei, was suggested by Young along with developer William Zeckendorf. The proposal called for an 80-story, 5-million-square-foot (460,000 m^{2}) tower that would have succeeded the Empire State Building as the world's tallest building. The other, by Fellheimer & Wagner, was put forth by New Haven's chairman Patrick B. McGinnis along with Wolfson. The plan envisioned a 55-story building, the largest office building in the world with 4 to 6 million square feet (370,000 to 560,000 m^{2}). Both proposals were poorly received, with 235 architects cosigning a letter imploring Young and McGinnis to reject the plans. Neither plan was ultimately ever carried out.

Though the New Haven and New York Central continued to struggle financially, both railroads agreed to work with Wolfson, the New Haven's developer. In February 1955, Wolfson, the Scheftels, and Alfred G. Burger proposed a 65-story tower called Grand Central City, which would replace a six-story baggage structure north of the terminal. Richard Roth of Emery Roth and Sons, who created the design, had agreed to participate only if the office building would not result in the passenger concourse's demolition. The plans were widely circulated in the New York Herald Tribune, The New York Times, and The Wall Street Journal. The proposal garnered significant opposition after architect Giorgio Cavaglieri expressed concerns about the effects of the proposed building on traffic congestion in the area.

Roth and Wolfson's plan was effectively forgotten in March 1955 when Zeckendorf was named the partner for any new development in the vicinity of Grand Central. Zeckendorf and Pei modified the blueprints for their 80-story tower but never publicly announced the revised plans. Unpublished drawings indicate that Pei's second design was supposed to be a hyperboloid-shaped tower. For various reasons, the hyperboloid tower never progressed past the planning stage. The building had faced extensive criticism from both professionals and the general public; the railroads faced significant financial shortfalls; and the economy as a whole had started to decline, leaving Zeckendorf unable to finance the project. Meanwhile, traffic around Grand Central Terminal worsened in the late 1950s.

==== Revival of plans ====
In January 1958, representatives of an unnamed large company, who were unaware of Grand Central City's cancellation, notified Stuart Scheftel that they were interested in leasing space in the new building. Upon learning of the news, Young placed Scheftel in contact with his real estate agent. Although Young died by suicide shortly afterward, the remaining partners continued working on the project. A revised version of Roth's plan was announced in May 1958. The plan called for a 50-story aluminum and glass tower parallel to Park Avenue, with 3 million square feet (280,000 m^{2}) of floor area; three theaters with a total capacity of 5,000; an open-air restaurant on the seventh floor; and a 2,000-spot parking garage. The New York Central and New Haven railroads were guaranteed at least $1 million a year from the agreement. Despite the presence of tracks under the building site, Wolfson said a survey of the site had "no insurmountable problems". James Ruderman, the building's structural engineer, had drawn up preliminary plans for a steel framework spanning the tracks. Wolfson hired James D. Landauer Associates Inc. to handle leasing at the proposed building, negotiating directly with tenants' brokers.

Wolfson found Roth's revised plan to be unsatisfactorily modest for such a prominent site. He said in the New York Herald Tribune that he wanted to "avoid adding just another massive shape to an already developed midtown business community". In July 1958, architects Walter Gropius and Pietro Belluschi were announced as co-designers for Grand Central City. Wolfson expressed his hope that Gropius and Belluschi, both prominent architects in the Modern style, would be able to help devise an "esthetic and functional design". Initially, Gropius and Belluschi were to serve a relatively minor advisory role. A week after being hired, Gropius suggested that the slab be oriented east–west, with a large plaza or courtyard in front of the tower, similar to the design of Lever House. Gropius also recommended that the building include a textured facade, rather than the metal-and-glass curtain walls commonly used by the Roth firm in its previous buildings. Gropius modified the plans in mid-1958; the facade would use simulated stone, the large plaza was dropped from the plans, and the tower was moved northward to 45th Street. That October, Wolfson traveled to Europe to study buildings and gain inspiration for the building's design.

Gropius and the Roth firm continued to modify their design through early 1959. The revised final plans were announced in February 1959. While Wolfson had promised a "modest" redesign, the new plans were a radical change from Roth's 1958 plan, calling for a 55-story octagonal tower parallel to 45th Street, with 2.4 million square feet (220,000 m^{2}) of space. The Roth firm said the octagonal massing could absorb "different planes of light as on a diamond", while Gropius said the new alignment was easier for air conditioning. The octagonal building was smaller than the original plans, but Gropius's team reasoned that a 3-million-square-foot (280,000 m^{2}) edifice would have been too large to rent out. The Roth firm expressed its concerns over the east–west orientation of the tower, since it would raise the cost of the superstructure by 50 percent compared to a slab oriented north–south. A model of the redesigned tower was exhibited publicly in November 1959.

=== Construction ===
==== Initial work ====
Five leases for a collective 600,000 square feet (56,000 m^{2}) in Grand Central City were announced immediately after the final design was announced in February 1959. A contract for 40,000 short tons (36,000 long tons; 36,000 t) of structural steel was awarded to U.S. Steel's American Bridge division that May; at the time, the contract was reportedly the most expensive ever awarded for an office building. Ruderman finalized his plans for the framework in September 1959. The next month British firm City Centre Properties invested $25 million and took a half interest in Grand Central City's development, covering part of the project's $100 million cost. It was the first British–American joint venture for a real estate development in the United States. Gordon I. Kyle, an appraiser who had calculated the valuations of more than two-thirds of Manhattan's skyscrapers, concluded that the building would be worth twice as much as the Empire State Building. Wolfson and City Centre paid Kyle $50,000, which at the time was the highest single appraiser's fee ever recorded.

The New York Central Railroad granted an 80-year lease for the air rights above the building, in exchange for a portion of the building's gross revenue. (Note: New York Central's income was guaranteed to be $1.1 million or 8 percent of the gross rental, whichever was larger.) This agreement added about $6 million to the construction cost. Final plans were filed with the New York City Department of Buildings on November 24, 1959. Construction on the structure officially started two days afterward on November 26, and Cushman & Wakefield were named as leasing agents for Grand Central City the following month. This was followed by contracts for the building's soundproofing and elevators in February 1960. James Ruderman had devised engineering plans for five other structures above the Park Avenue railroad tracks. As the Grand Central City site was impossible to excavate, the substructure had to be erected while the baggage building served as a staging area. Furthermore, as some materials would have to be delivered by railroad, material deliveries would be coordinated closely to avoid delays on the commuter rail lines entering Grand Central.

Construction of the substructure commenced in May 1960, during which the architects finalized plans for the entrances, lobbies, and facade lighting. Gropius was involved in all aspects of the building's design, from traffic flow to minor architectural details, which sometimes led to conflicts with the project's other architects and engineers. For example, he wanted the lobby's bronze details to contain a matte finish, and he requested that the elevator penthouse be no higher than 26 feet (7.9 m) above the roof so that it did not "look silly". Work on the tower itself was held up by a steel strike that lasted through much of 1960; the baggage handling building was ultimately demolished starting that June. Foundations for the building were sunk in August 1960.

==== Pan Am lease and completion ====
Pan Am founder Juan Trippe signed a 25-year, $115.5 million (equivalent to $962 million in 2025 (Note: Johnston, Louis; Williamson, Samuel H. (2023). "What Was the U.S. GDP Then?". MeasuringWorth. United States Gross Domestic Product deflator figures follow the MeasuringWorth series.)) lease for 613,000 square feet (56,900 m^{2}) across 15 floors, plus a new main ticket office at 45th Street and Vanderbilt Avenue, in September 1960. In an indication of the widespread interest surrounding this lease, the mayor and the governor of New York both congratulated Grand Central City's builders after the lease was signed. Following this, Pan Am hired Ivan Chermayeff to design the building's signage. Grand Central City officially became known as the Pan Am Building in December 1960, after its major lessee. Signs bearing the company's name or logo were placed atop the four major facades. Originally, Trippe had wanted signs with the name "Pan Am" on all eight facades, but this was scaled down after Gropius objected that the large number of signs would decrease "the dignity of the building". The Pan Am Building's developers secured a $70 million mortgage loan and a $65 million construction loan during January 1961. At the time, the building was more than half rented.

The Pan Am Building's construction involved over 200 engineers and 7,500 workers from 75 trades. Three derricks were installed to erect the steel for the tower, while four derricks were used for the base. Five to seven steel columns were installed every day during two shifts, with materials deliveries taking place mostly at night. The Pan Am Building's structural steel topped out during May 1962. The facade cladding was installed in two ways. The facade of the base was bolted into place, down to the individual spandrels and mullions. The Mo-Sai panels for the tower were installed via an interior hoist. Wolfson, though recovering from surgery during mid-1962, continued to observe the building's progress using a helicopter. When Wolfson died that June, James D. Landauer was selected to oversee the building's completion. The lobby, the last part of the Pan Am Building to be completed, was built with cheap materials such as restroom tiles because the builders had run out of money toward the project's completion.

=== Opening and Pan Am ownership ===
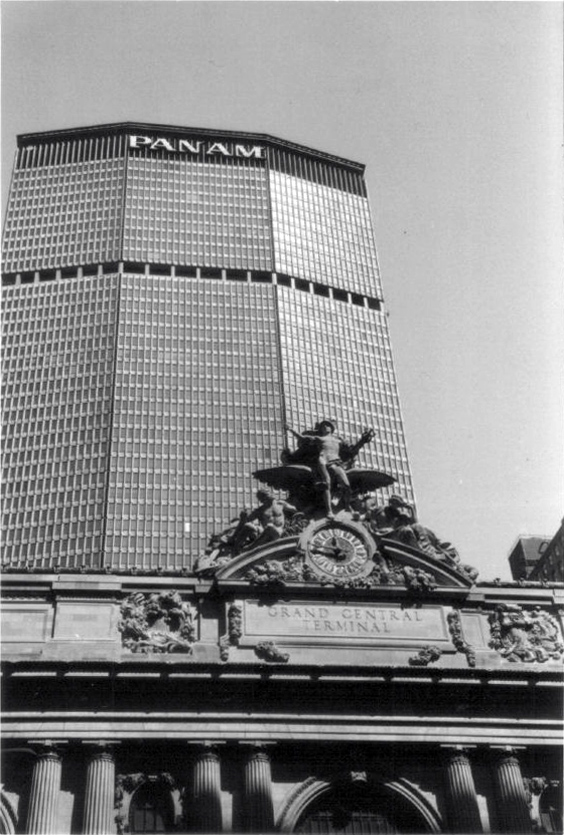
The Pan Am Building as seen in the 1980s

The as-yet-incomplete Pan Am Building was formally opened on March 7, 1963, with a ceremony attended by British and American officials, and tenants started moving into the structure the following month. The building had secured tenants for 91 percent of its office space upon opening, in large part to its central location. Within three months, the Pan Am Building was 92 percent rented and 70 percent occupied; by the first anniversary of its opening, the building was 97 percent leased with 241 tenants. This contrasted greatly with the smaller Empire State Building, which was only 25 percent rented when it opened and did not reach full occupancy for more than a decade afterward. At the time of its completion, the Pan Am Building was the largest commercial office development in the world by square footage, being surpassed nearly a decade later by 55 Water Street and the World Trade Center in lower Manhattan. In the 15 years prior to the Pan Am Building's opening, 147 office buildings had been completed in Manhattan, totaling 50.632 million square feet (4,703,900 m^{2}) of office space.

Initially, the airline only had a 10 percent ownership stake in its namesake building. Besides Pan Am, other early tenants included the Westinghouse Electric Corporation, Alcoa, the Hammermill Paper Company, National Steel Corporation, Kodak, the Reader's Digest Association, Mitsui, Chrysler, and the British Iron & Steel Corporation. The shops at the Pan Am Building's base were opened in August 1963. The tenant selection process was rigorous, as Cushman and Wakefield examining the services and goods sold by potential tenants: for example, the firm's vice president got haircuts from each of the six applicants for the lobby barbershop. Furthermore, average rents in the Pan Am Building were about $6.75 per square foot ($72.7/m^{2}), slightly higher than the average of $5.25 to $6 per square foot ($56.5 to $64.6/m^{2}) in other Midtown Manhattan buildings.

Although the Pan Am Building's completion averted the terminal's imminent destruction, New York Central had experienced further decline, merging with the Pennsylvania Railroad in 1968 to form the Penn Central Railroad. That year, Pan Am bought a 45 percent stake in the building from the estate of Jack Cotton, formerly chairman and co-owner of City Centre Properties. After Penn Central went bankrupt in 1970, it sought to sell its properties, including the land below the Pan Am Building. Among the building's tenants during this time was the United Brands Company (now Chiquita Brands International), whose CEO, Eli M. Black, jumped from the 44th story to his death on February 3, 1975.

Pan Am was considering moving its headquarters from the building by 1978. That year, the airline bought the remaining 45 percent stake in the building from Wolfson, obtaining full ownership of the property. A Pan Am subsidiary, Grand Central Building Inc., acquired the underlying land for about $25 million (equivalent to $89 million in 2025) the following year as part of a legal settlement with Penn Central. The airline sustained large financial losses during the early 1980s recession, leading it to announce in February 1980 that it was considering selling the building. About half the leases were scheduled to expire in three or four years. Many lessees were exempt from paying the building's operating costs, which made the Pan Am Building only marginally profitable for the airline. Amid high fuel costs and a lack of income from airfare, Pan Am decided in April 1980 that it would definitely sell the building.

=== Sale to MetLife and renovations ===
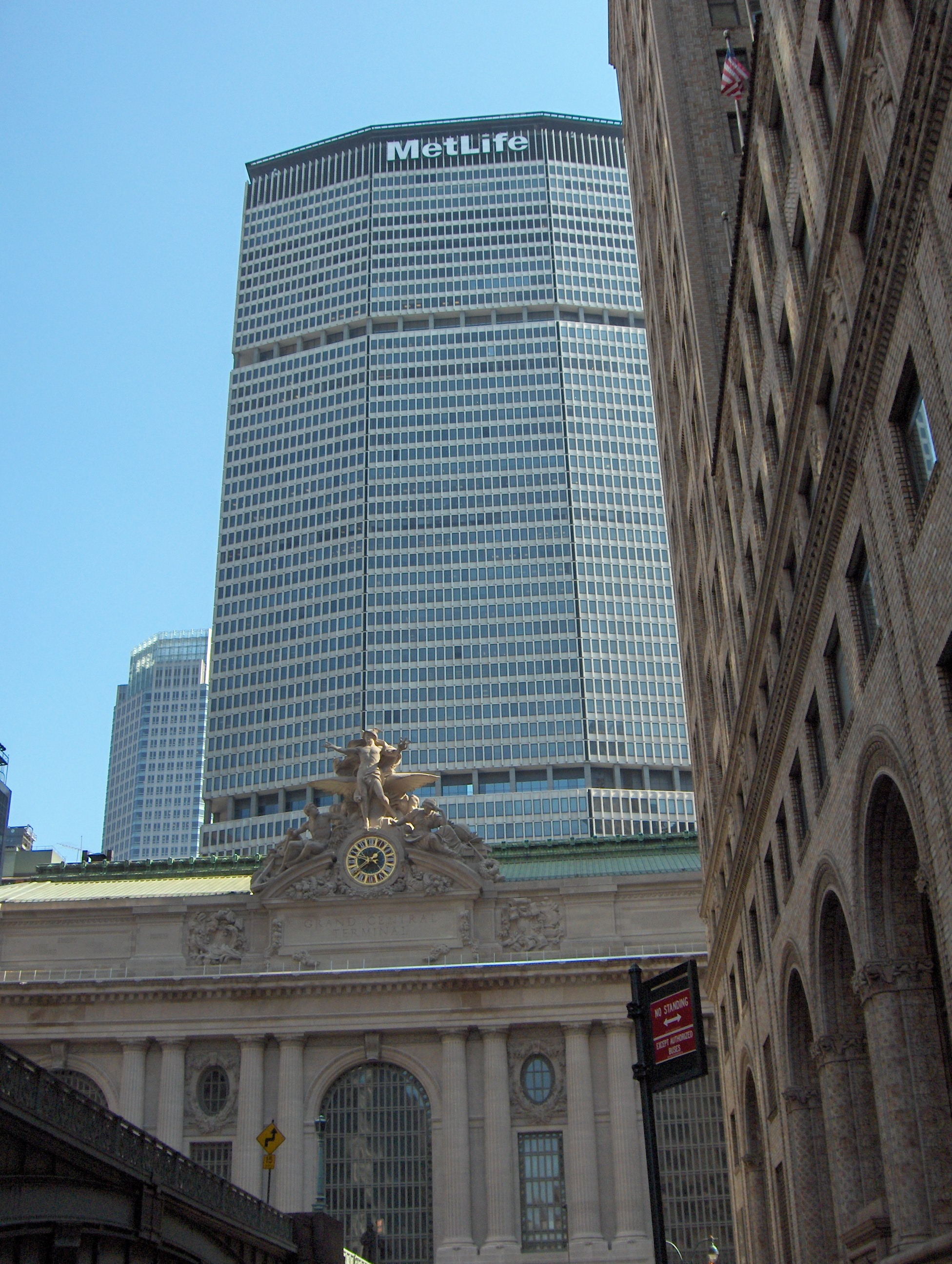
Seen from the south, with Grand Central Terminal in the foreground and the Pershing Square Building at right

When the Pan Am Building officially went on the market in May 1980, Business Week magazine predicted that it might be sold for as much as $200 million (equivalent to $655 million in 2025). The sale was so complex that Landauer Associates published a 65-page brochure just to describe the terms of the sale. Nine bidders submitted offers, five of whom were selected for further consideration: the Metropolitan Life Insurance Company (MetLife), the Equitable Life Assurance Society; Donald Trump; Paul Milstein; and Olympia and York. (Note: Additional firms were invited to bid on the property, though some chose not to bid, while the others were eliminated in the first round of consideration. The other bidders included the Prudential Life Insurance Company; Corporate Property Investors; the Fisher Brothers; the Aetna Life Insurance Company; the Rreef Corporation; and an investment group which included Bernard H. Mendik, Robert Tishman, and Jerry Speyer.) In July 1980, Pan Am sold the building to MetLife for $400 million (equivalent to $1,310 million in 2025). At the time, it was the highest-priced sale of an office building in Manhattan. This was attributed not only to a rezoning of the surrounding area, allowing developers to erect higher buildings there, but also to a strong office market. The sale price amounted to $177 per square foot ($1,910/m^{2}), more than any other office building in Manhattan. MetLife did not plan to move any offices to the building, and Pan Am planned to keep its headquarters there. As a condition of the sale, the building would retain Pan Am's name until the airline ceased to be the building's anchor tenant.

The sale was finalized in 1981 when Pan Am transferred stock in the building to MetLife, a move that let the airline avoid paying most of the estate transfer tax. Pan Am normally would have paid a $4 million tax, but it ultimately paid only $125. Cross & Brown assumed the responsibility of leasing the building's space. At the time, leases for much of the interior space were set to expire all at once during the early 1980s. Starting in 1984, MetLife renovated about half of the space as the original tenants' leases expired. The deteriorating lobby, used by 100,000 pedestrians a day, was extensively reconfigured by Warren Platner. In addition, some mechanical systems were upgraded to comply with building codes, and retail spaces were added. Asbestos fireproofing on the office stories was removed in advance of an anti-asbestos regulation passed by the city government in 1985. The lobby renovation had been completed by 1987 at a cost of $15 million.

By 1991, Pan Am's presence had dwindled to four floors. MetLife preferred to refer to the building as 200 Park Avenue, its address. At the time, the Pan Am Building was 95 percent occupied, and the public variously referred to the building by the names of its large tenants, such as Mitsui, Dreyfus, and Rogers & Wells. Pan Am moved its headquarters to Miami that year and closed down shortly afterward. In September 1992, MetLife announced that it would remove Pan Am signage from 200 Park Avenue and add letters bearing its own name. According to a MetLife spokesperson, the sign change was taking place because the airline had become defunct. The signs were changed in January 1993. Though 200 Park Avenue subsequently became known as the MetLife Building, its namesake was then headquartered in the Metropolitan Life Insurance Company Tower. As a result, the Park Avenue structure was known specifically as the "MetLife Building 200 Park Avenue".

=== 21st century ===
Further renovations to 200 Park Avenue's exterior and lobby were undertaken during 2001 and 2002. Low-pressure compressed air was used to clean the facade, while Kohn Pedersen Fox renovated the lobby. In 2005, MetLife moved its board room from the Metropolitan Life Tower to 200 Park Avenue. The same year, the company considered selling 200 Park Avenue to pay for its acquisition of Travelers Life & Annuity. Ultimately, MetLife sold the building that April for $1.72 billion, to a joint venture of Tishman Speyer Properties, the New York City Employees' Retirement System, and the New York City Teachers' Retirement System. At the time, the sale was the largest ever transaction involving an office building. The company still retained a boardroom and corporate suite at 200 Park Avenue.

MetLife announced in 2015 that it was consolidating its operations at 200 Park Avenue, with 500,000 square feet (46,000 m^{2}) in its namesake building. At the time, Donald Bren, the billionaire owner of the real estate firm Irvine Company, held a 97.3 percent ownership stake in the building. While Tishman Speyer remained the managing partner of the property, its ownership stake had been reduced to less than 3 percent. Plans to renovate the lobby were devised in 2016. The next year, the neon light sources for the signs atop the building were swapped with LED light sources to conserve energy. A renovation of 200 Park Avenue's lobby started in late 2018. The work included simplifying the lobby's layout by removing storefronts and restoring direct connections to some of Grand Central's platforms. Three restaurant owners leased space in the building in mid-2022, and MetLife extended its lease the next year.

CBRE Group took over as the building's leasing manager in mid-2024, succeeding Tishman Speyer as leasing manager. Irvine bought out Tishman Speyer's ownership stake at this time. The building was 97 percent occupied by that October, at which point another restaurateur had leased space in the lobby. The Irvine Company refinanced the building in early 2025 with a $1.5 billion mortgage loan.

== Reception ==
=== Initial commentary ===
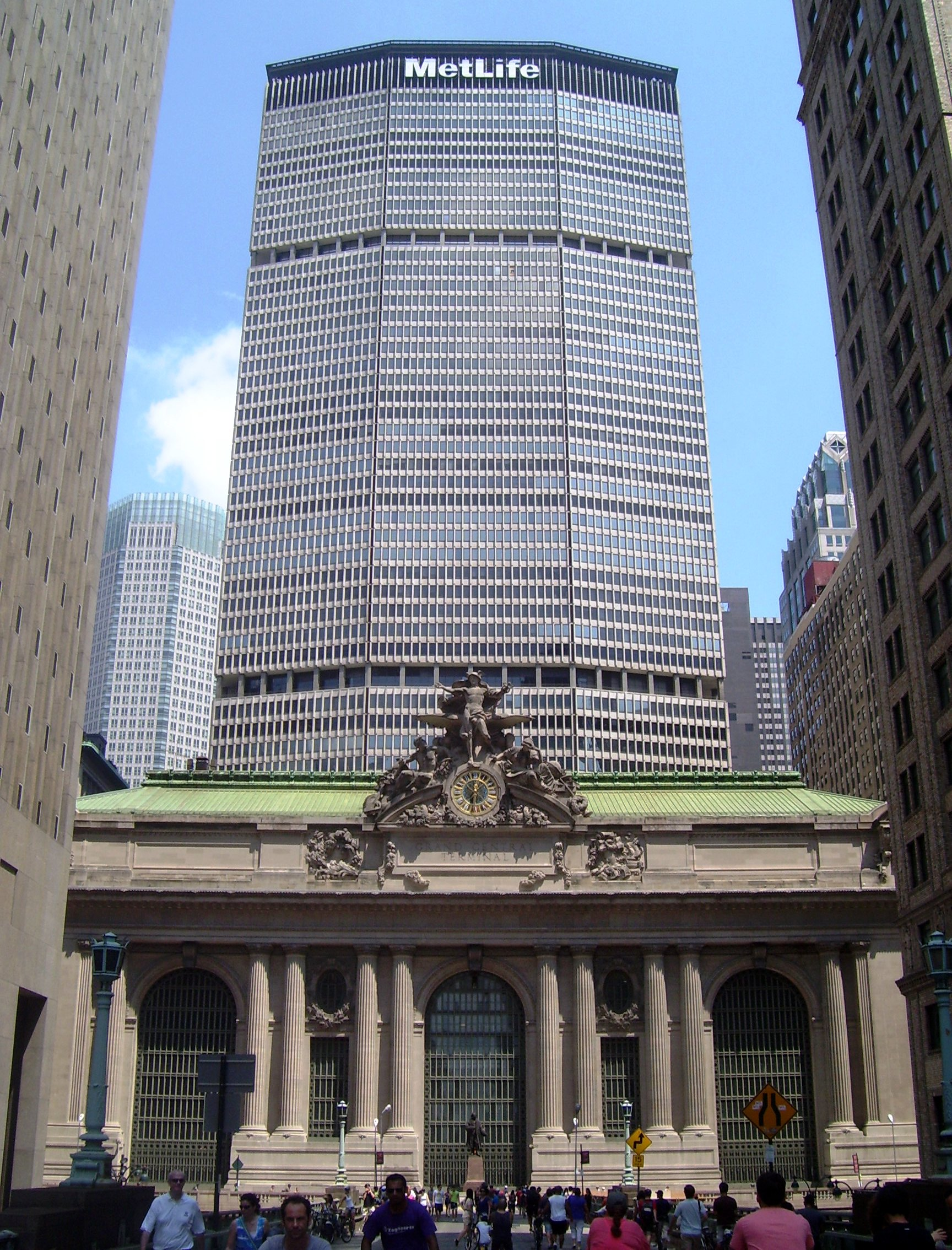
View from the south, with Grand Central Terminal in front

The building's design generated significant controversy from its initial announcement in 1959. Architectural historian Sibyl Moholy-Nagy wrote in Progressive Architecture magazine that the original tower plans "provided human scale and architectural personality", which were "lost" in the revision. Walter McQuade, writing for The Nation, expressed dissatisfaction with even the preliminary drawings. International critics, including Italian critic Gillo Dorfles and Romanian architect Martin Pinchis, also criticized the proposal.

Specific concerns included the building's potential impact on transportation infrastructure and urban planning. Architect Victor Gruen questioned the necessity of including a parking garage given the site's proximity to Grand Central Terminal, while Progressive Architecture editor Thomas H. Creighton suggested the space would be better utilized as an open plaza. Additional critics expressed concerns that the building would strain existing transit infrastructure.

The proposal also had supporters within the architectural community. Natalie Parry defended the plans in Progressive Architecture, arguing they preserved Grand Central's "star-studded" Main Concourse "together with the precious air space above it". Historian Paul Zucker, urban planner Charles Abrams, and Architectural Record editor Emerson Goble also supported the project, defending its urban planning principles.

=== Post-completion assessment ===
According to contemporary accounts, the building's engineers had not anticipated positive architectural reviews, as the structure was developed primarily for financial rather than aesthetic purposes. Upon the building's completion in 1963, critical reception remained largely negative. Much of the criticism focused on the building's scale and its impact on the surrounding urban environment, particularly the building's bulk and horizontal facade design. James T. Burns Jr. wrote in Progressive Architecture that the relationship between the base, tower, parking garage, and Grand Central Terminal was "occasionally inexcusably jarring", and described the lobby as an extension of the exterior's "monolithism". Architecture critic Ada Louise Huxtable characterized the building as "a colossal collection of minimums" and described the lobby artwork as a "face-saving gimmick".

A recurring theme in the criticism was the building's perceived disruption of Park Avenue's visual continuity. Multiple observers noted that the monolithic design obstructed northward views along the avenue. Art historian Vincent Scully described the building in 1961 as a "fatal blow" to Park Avenue's continuity, while artist Claes Oldenburg referenced the building's positioning in his 1965 artwork Proposed Colossal Monument for Park Avenue, NYC: Good Humor Bar.

Architect Walter Gropius defended the building's size by referencing the 1916 Zoning Resolution, stating that "every citizen has the right to use the law as far as he can"; his response prompted additional negative commentary. Emerson Goble, who had personal relationships with Gropius and Belluschi, wrote supportive articles in The New York Times and Architectural Record, particularly praising the pedestrian circulation systems. Gropius also authored a defense of the building, though this was noted to contain few specific architectural details.

=== Later assessments ===
The 1980s lobby renovation generated additional criticism from architectural observers. Carter Wiseman compared the new interior decorations to the style of performer Liberace, writing that "even Liberace would have blushed at the vulgarity". Architecture critic Paul Goldberger of The New York Times wrote that while the original lobby design was "stark and unwelcoming", the renovation created "a space that is so forced in its joy, so false and so disingenuous, that they make one yearn for some good old-fashioned coldness".

Public opinion surveys from the period reflected continuing negative sentiment. In 1987, New York magazine conducted a poll of over 100 prominent New Yorkers asking which buildings they would prefer to see demolished; the Pan Am Building ranked first on this list. By contrast, architect Robert A. M. Stern stated in 1988 that while the building represented "a wrong-headed dream badly realized", it nevertheless warranted preservation consideration from the New York City Landmarks Preservation Commission.

By the early 21st century, some former critics began expressing more nuanced views, while preservation advocates argued for protecting mid-20th century modernist buildings like the MetLife Building. In 2016, ArchDaily described the building as "commendable for its robust form and excellent public spaces, as well as its excellent integration into the elevated arterial roads around it". The building's prominent profile has led to its use as a filming location for various movies and television productions, contributing to its recognition in popular culture.

== See also ==
- Architecture of New York City
- List of tallest buildings in New York City
- List of skyscrapers by floor area
