= Dollar Savings Bank Building =

Historic building in the Bronx, New York

- Dollar Savings Bank
- U.S. National Register of Historic Places
- New York State Register of Historic Places
- New York City Landmark
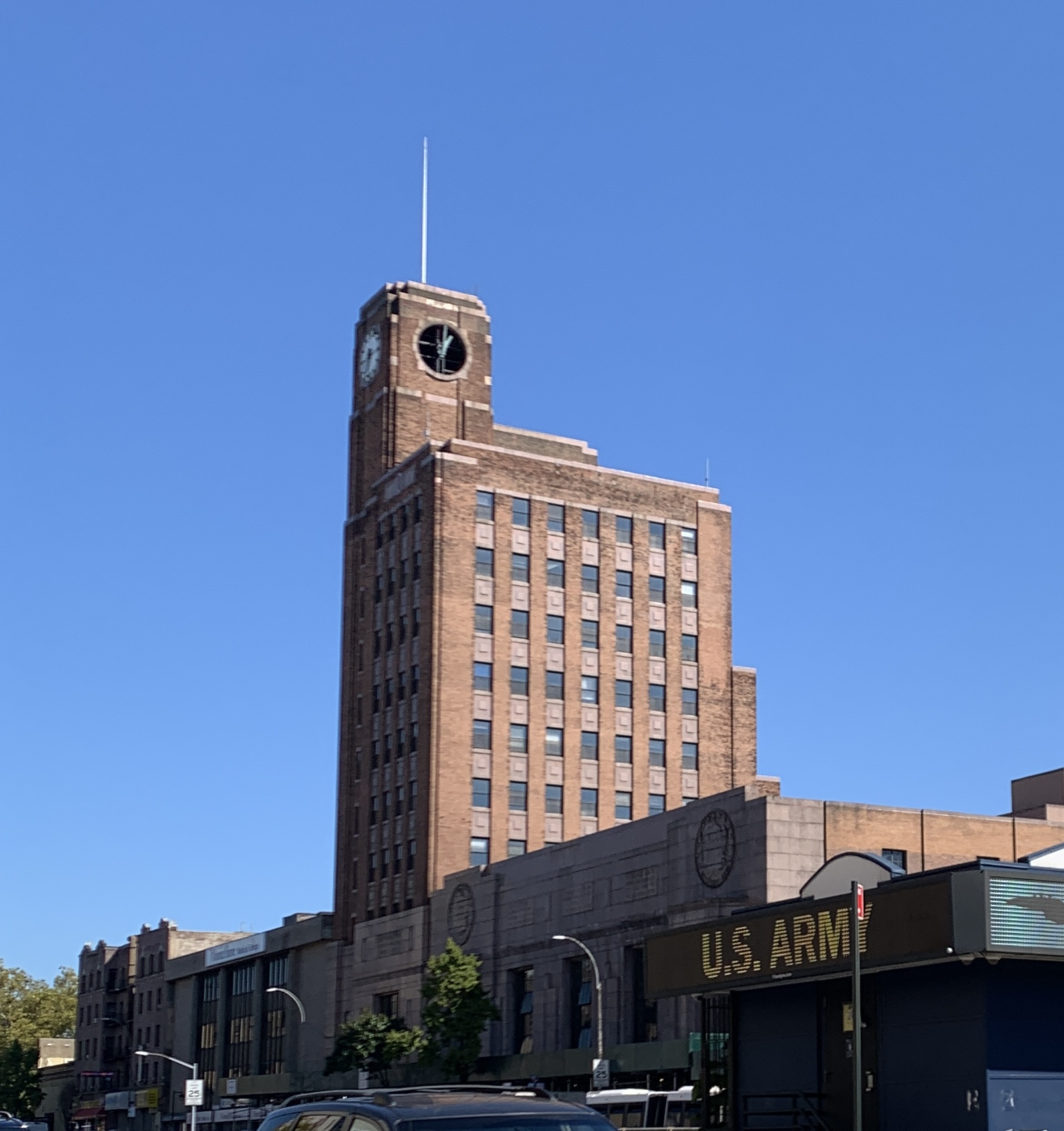

- Location within New York City Location within New York Location within the United States
- Location: 2516–2530 Grand Concourse; Bronx, New York, United States
- Coordinates: 40°51′48″N 73°53′46″W
- Area: 0.45 acres (0.18 ha)
- Built: 1932–1952
- NRHP reference No.: 100010987
- NYSRHP No.: 00501.000952
- NYCL No.: 1889, 1890

Significant dates
- Added to NRHP: 2024-11-18
- Designated NYSRHP: 2024-09-12
- Designated NYCL: 1994-07-19

The Dollar Savings Bank Building is a former bank building at 2516–2530 Grand Concourse in the Fordham neighborhood of the Bronx in New York City, New York, U.S. Constructed for the defunct Dollar Savings Bank in three phases between 1932 and 1952, it was designed by Adolf L. Muller, an associate of Halsey, McCormack & Helmer. The building uses motifs designed in the Art Deco style, with influences from classical architecture. The building's facade and interior are New York City designated landmarks, and the building is listed on the National Register of Historic Places.

The building consists of a 1-to-4-story banking wing to the south and a 10-story office wing to the north. The banking wing has a granite facade measuring 150 feet (46 m) wide along Grand Concourse, with entrance pavilions to the north and south, flanking large windows in the center. The office wing is clad with granite on its lower stories, with two additional entrances, while the upper stories are clad with brick and architectural terracotta. The northwest corner of the office wing has a clock tower with four faces, protruding above the roof. Inside the banking-hall wing is a double-height column-free space with classical decorations and five murals about the Bronx. The basement has a safe-deposit lobby and was built with offices, storage, and steel vaults. The office wing contains a banking annex, a lobby, and office spaces.

The site was originally part of the estate of John Valentine and acquired by the Dollar Savings Bank in 1932. The first part of the banking hall opened in 1933, and it was expanded northward between 1937 and 1938. Further growth in the bank's business prompted another expansion from 1949 to 1952. The building was acquired by the Dollar Dry Dock Savings Bank in 1983, then the Emigrant Savings Bank in 1992. The two portions of the building came under different ownership in the late 20th and early 21st centuries; the banking hall continued to host a bank, while the office wing housed a social-service agency. In 2013, Ivan Diaz bought both portions. The bank closed in 2014, and the building was redeveloped into a supermarket and dormitory in the 2020s.

== Site ==
The Dollar Savings Bank Building is located at 2516–2530 Grand Concourse in the Fordham neighborhood of the Bronx in New York City, New York, U.S. It occupies a city block bounded by Grand Concourse to the west, Fordham Road to the south, Valentine Avenue to the east, and 192nd Street to the north. The surrounding area includes Art Deco apartment buildings rising five to six stories. The building shares the block with the former Concourse Theatre at 2500–2514 Grand Concourse to the south, and an office building at 2540 Grand Concourse to the north. Other nearby buildings include the Edgar Allan Poe Cottage one block north and the Paradise Theater two blocks south.

== Architecture ==
The Dollar Savings Bank Building was developed in three phases dating from 1932–1933, 1937–1938, and 1949–1952, all designed by the firm of Halsey, McCormack & Helmer. The firm had previously designed several other banks, including the Williamsburgh Savings Bank Tower, the Onondaga County Savings Bank Building, and the Dime Savings Bank Building's 1930s expansion, all in New York state. Of the architects at Halsey, McCormack & Helmer, Adolf L. Muller (sometimes spelled Adolph) had the greatest involvement with all three sections. The motifs are designed in the Art Deco style, but it uses overscaled proportions and monolithic granite slabs, which are more typical of classical architecture.

=== Facade ===
The building consists of a low-rise banking hall wing to the south and a 10-story office wing to the north. The banking hall wing is two to three stories high along its front (western) elevation, and there are one- and four-story-high additions along its rear (eastern) elevation. The three phases were constructed sequentially from south to north; the banking hall wing was constructed during the first and second phases, while the office wing was built during the third phase. The southernmost (first) and northernmost (third) sections each have a frontage of 50 feet (15 m) on Grand Concourse, while the central section has a 100-foot (30 m) frontage. In both the banking hall and office wings, the western elevation is clad in polished pink granite to the third floor. Other parts of the facade are clad in brick and architectural terracotta.

==== Banking hall wing ====
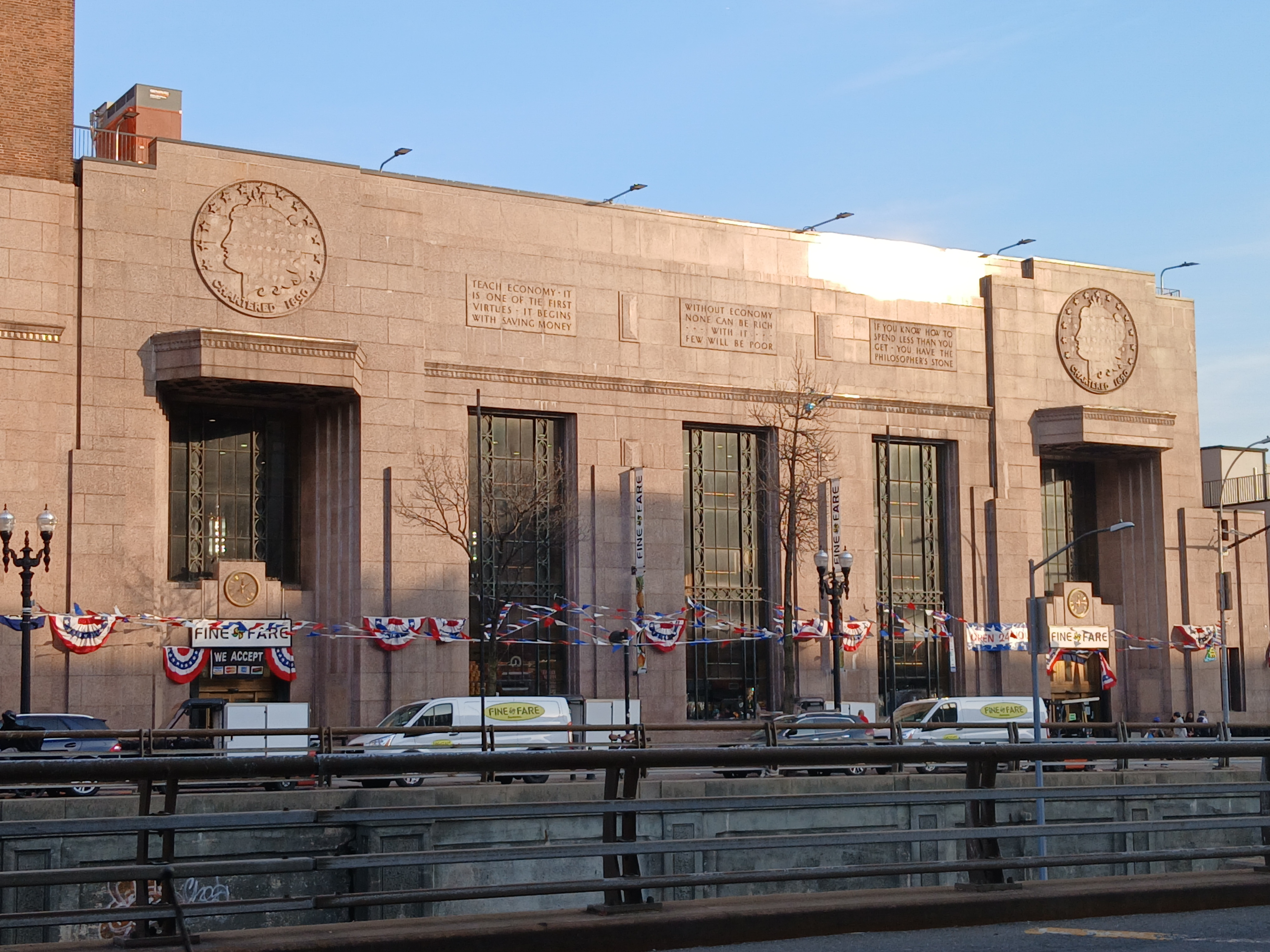
Exterior of the banking room wing

The banking hall's facade measures 150 feet (46 m) wide along Grand Concourse. The banking room's western elevation has entrance pavilions at its southern and northern ends, which are identical and protrude slightly from the facade. Both entrance pavilions have recessed double-height openings. The lower portion of each opening contains a smaller granite enframement with embedded brass-and-glass vitrines, which each flank a set of bronze doors. Above each set of doors are transom windows within bronze frames, along with granite pediments containing clock faces. The upper half of each opening has a large window with steel sash and bronze grilles. Geometric granite canopies protrude above each opening; the soffit, or underside, of each canopy has opaque glass panels inset within a grid of bronze strips. The soffits have downlights and formerly included pendants. A depiction of a Liberty Head dollar is mounted onto the attic above each entrance.

The southern banking hall entrance, part of the first phase, was originally symmetrically flanked by shorter pylon-shaped bays. The right-side (southern) bay, the only one that remains intact, contains a protruding flagpole, while the left-side (northern) bay was demolished with the second-phase expansion. This expansion includes the wall separating the two banking-hall entrances, which is divided into three bays. Each bay has multi-paned sash windows spanning the first and second stories, each with bronze grilles and mullions. There are buttresses and reliefs between each opening. Above the windows, the attic has plaques with inscriptions relating to thrift. The southern elevation is a party wall, with an 11-foot-wide (3.4 m) granite return at its western end, wrapping around from the front elevation. The rest of the southern elevation is made of brick, with sash windows, and originally contained signage for the banks inside.

==== Office wing ====
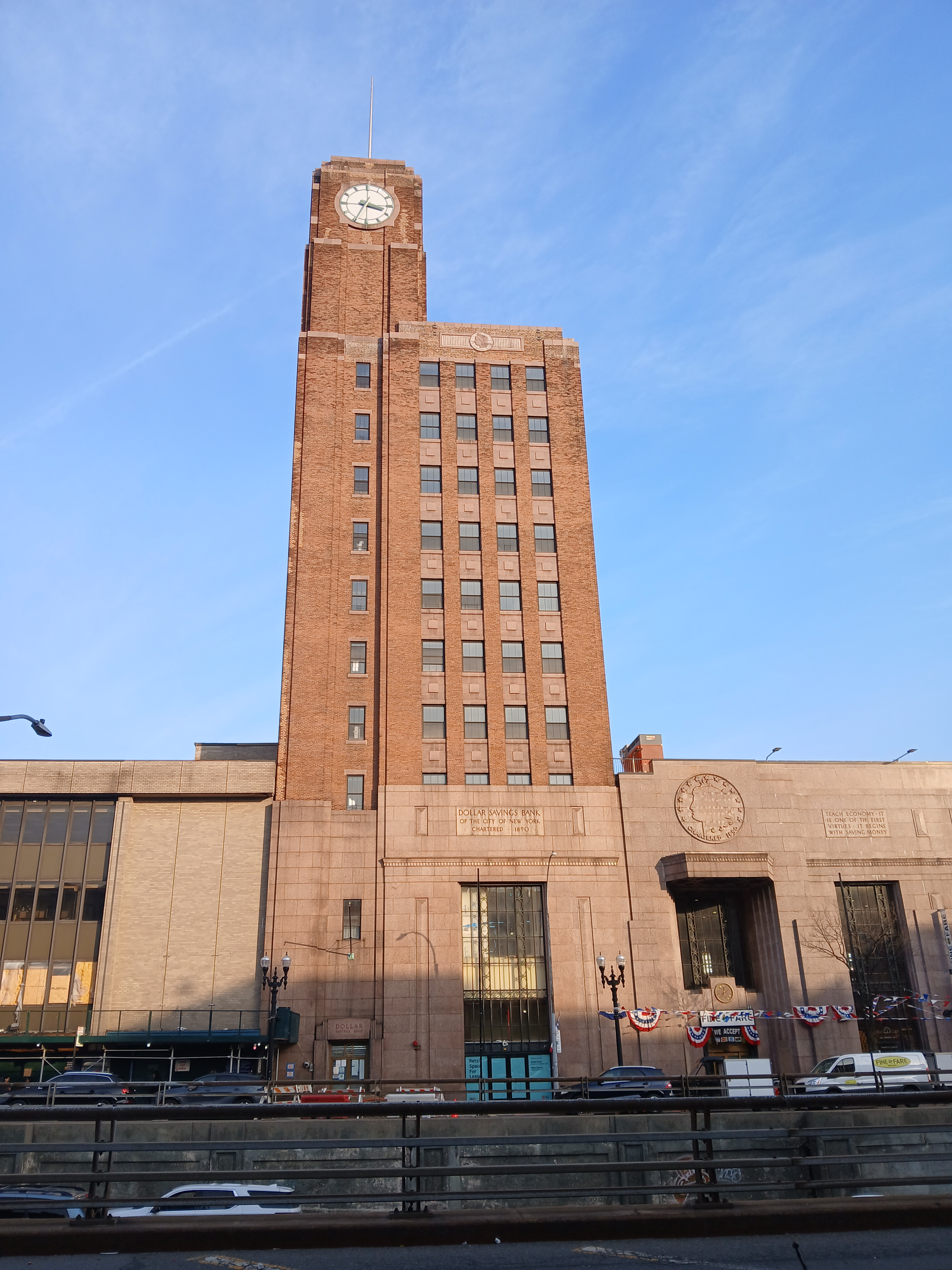
Exterior of the office wing

The office wing consists of ten office stories. The lower stories have a granite facade, and there is an office entrance in the northernmost bay of the front elevation. This entrance has brass-and-glass doors, a bronze transom, a granite architrave, and a pediment with the Dollar Savings Bank's name inscribed on it. The southern bay originally functioned as a fourth window, but in 2018 it was converted into a doorway with aluminum-and-glass panes above. Like the center bays in the banking wing, this bay is topped by an inscribed plaque.

Above the base, the office wing's facade is made of brick, which is variously cited as being orange, or a mixture of rose and light-red. The upper facade is accented with terracotta trim. A four-sided clock campanile occupies the northwest corner of the office wing (directly above the office entrance), rising another 50 feet (15 m) from the office stories' roof. All four facades of the campanile contain buttresses, which extend to just below the clock faces. Each of the clock faces is 12 feet (3.7 m) in diameter and has bronze and glass decorations. East of the campanile, the office wing's roof has a brick bulkhead containing elevator equipment.

The office wing's western elevation is divided into five bays on the third through tenth stories. The four southern bays are separated vertically by brick piers, and the sash windows on each story are separated horizontally by pink spandrel panels made of terracotta. A Liberty Head plaque is installed above the tenth story. The western elevation's northernmost bay, within the campanile, is recessed between two buttresses, which rise 180 feet (55 m) from the street. There are sash windows on the remaining elevations of the office wing. The southern elevation is designed in a similar manner to the western elevation's four southern bays, with brick piers and terracotta spandrels; the top of this elevation was formerly surmounted by signage advertising the banks inside. The eastern elevation has four setbacks. The northern elevation is mostly windowless, as the interior elevators and stairs are directly behind the campanile's north wall.

=== Interior ===
The building has a steel skeletal frame, which is hidden behind the decorations on the facade. The party wall and the granite return conceal the banking room's trusses, and the piers and spandrels on the office wing hide the steel frame used in that section. The double-height banking hall dates from the first two phases of the building's construction. The banking hall is connected to a one-story banking annex in the office tower.

==== Banking hall ====
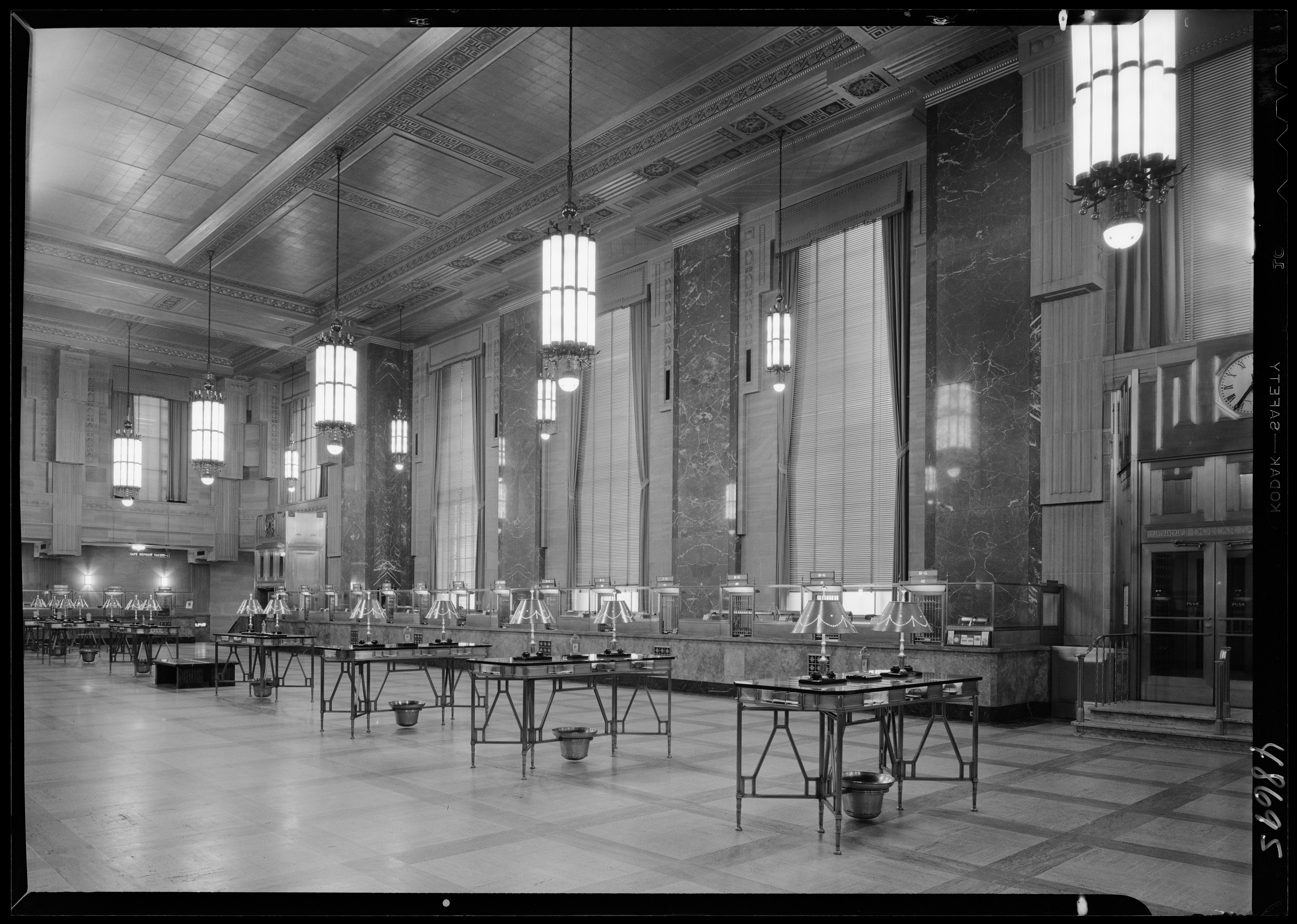
Interior of the banking hall

The banking hall is a large column-free space with classical decorations. As built, it was oriented east–west, with clerestory windows on the northern and southern walls. The original banking hall had a central public space, tellers' counters to the north and south, and executive offices to the east. The banking hall was extended north in the second phase of construction, giving it a north–south orientation. To compensate for the removal of the original northern wall, there are trusses supporting the attic above the banking hall, and the current northern wall is embedded within another truss.

The banking hall is reached from vestibules, which connect with the two entrance pavilions on Grand Concourse. There are slight variations in the vestibules' designs because the street slopes upward slightly toward the north. Within the northern vestibule, two steps from the banking hall ascend to the sidewalk level and are flanked by brass rails. Both vestibules have brass panels and brass ventilation grilles. On the eastern wall of each vestibule, three brass-and-glass doors open into the banking hall topped by transom windows. Above the windows are brass or bronze transom bars, which contain the inscription "Dollar Savings Bank", an inset clock, and meander motifs.

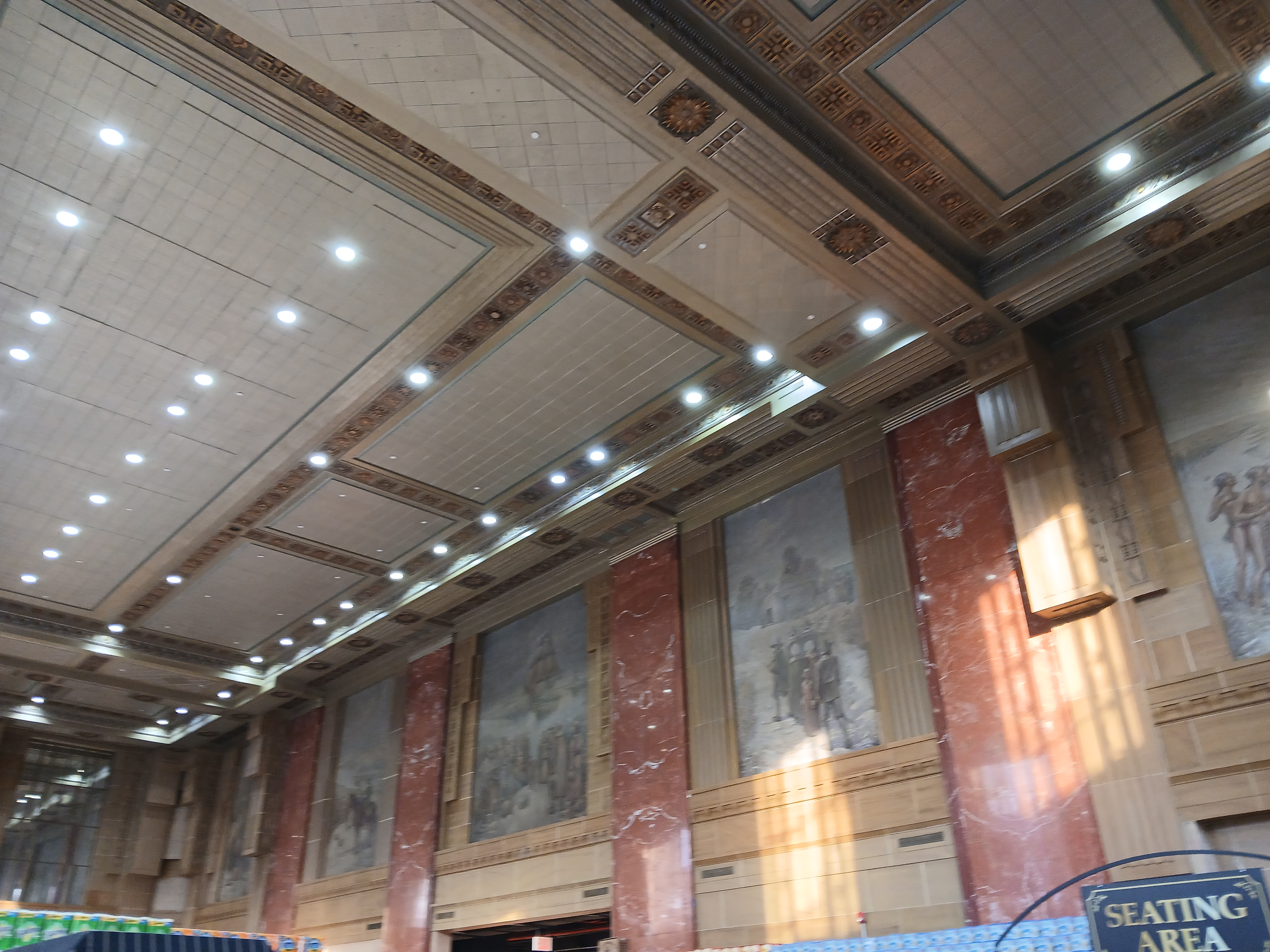
Murals on the eastern wall

The banking hall's floor surface is a dark-colored grid with light granite panels inside. Polished concrete is used for the floors in the room's northern and western sides, which contained tellers' counters until the third phase was built in 1949–1952. The western and eastern walls have red marble pilasters. There are double-height windows between the western wall's pilasters and limestone cladding along the remainders of the walls. On all walls except the western, there is a frieze and an architrave, which separate the lower portion of the wall from the upper, clerestory portion. At clerestory level, the corners of the room are chamfered. The northern and southern walls have clerestory windows between large terracotta corbels, which look out onto outdoor spaces to the south and offices to the north. The eastern wall has five murals about the Bronx's history, which were designed by Italian artisan Angelo Magnanti and installed in pieces through 1957. The room has a decorative plaster ceiling with ribs dividing the surface into panels. Decorations such as rosettes are placed at the intersections of ribs, and the ceiling also has silver-gilt and gold leaf decorations and cylindrical chandeliers. Between some of the ribs are acoustic ceiling tiles, which date from the third phase of construction.

==== Other spaces ====
A stairway at the southwestern corner of the banking hall, which dates from the original construction, descends to the safe-deposit lobby. Sometimes described as a spiral staircase, it has limestone treads, brass handrails, a marble banister and wainscoting. There is also an opaque-glass and aluminum chandelier suspended above it. In addition to this staircase, the basement has an elevator and a staircase from the east. The safe-deposit lobby has red-marble pilasters, red-marble wainscoting, and limestone panels above the wainscoting. This room has marble walls and a paneled plaster ceiling, along with Art Deco–style grilles and gate. The rest of the basement has utilitarian concrete surfaces except on the walls, where plaster is also used. It originally had bank offices, storage, and steel vaults.

North of the original banking hall is a banking annex, which was built as part of the third phase. The banking annex has a gridded granite floor, plaster-and-limestone walls, and limestone columns. The banking annex's one-story-high plaster ceiling has plaster ribs, which contain embedded air vents and light fixtures. There is a vestibule for the office wing at the building's northwestern corner, which has brass doors leading indoors. This vestibule connects with emergency-exit staircases from the basement and the upper stories, and it leads further inward to an office lobby. The office lobby's northern wall has two elevators and veined red-marble panels, while the eastern and southern walls have limestone ashlar embedded into the red-marble panels. There is also a plaster ceiling and, on the south wall, a marble staircase ascending to a mezzanine. There are about 5,000 square feet (460 m^{2}) on each floor of the office wing.

The third floor of the banking-hall wing has concrete floors and plaster walls and ceiling; it originally housed bank offices. Within the office wing, the remainders of the upper stories have been partitioned over the years. The office stories generally contain concrete floor slabs (much of which has been covered with other material), plaster walls, and gypsum board ceilings. These stories are accessed by the stair and two elevators at the northern end of the clock campanile. The elevator lobbies on these stories have ceramic tile floors and marble baseboards.

== History ==
The site was originally part of the estate of John Valentine, whose heirs sold his estate beginning in 1888. Although railroad and horsecar lines had been built to the Bronx in the mid- and late 19th century, the surrounding area had relatively little development until Grand Concourse was completed in the 1900s. The original tenant, the Dollar Savings Bank, was chartered in 1890 and originally located at 2808 Third Avenue. It was the first savings bank in the Bronx.

=== 1930s to 1950s ===
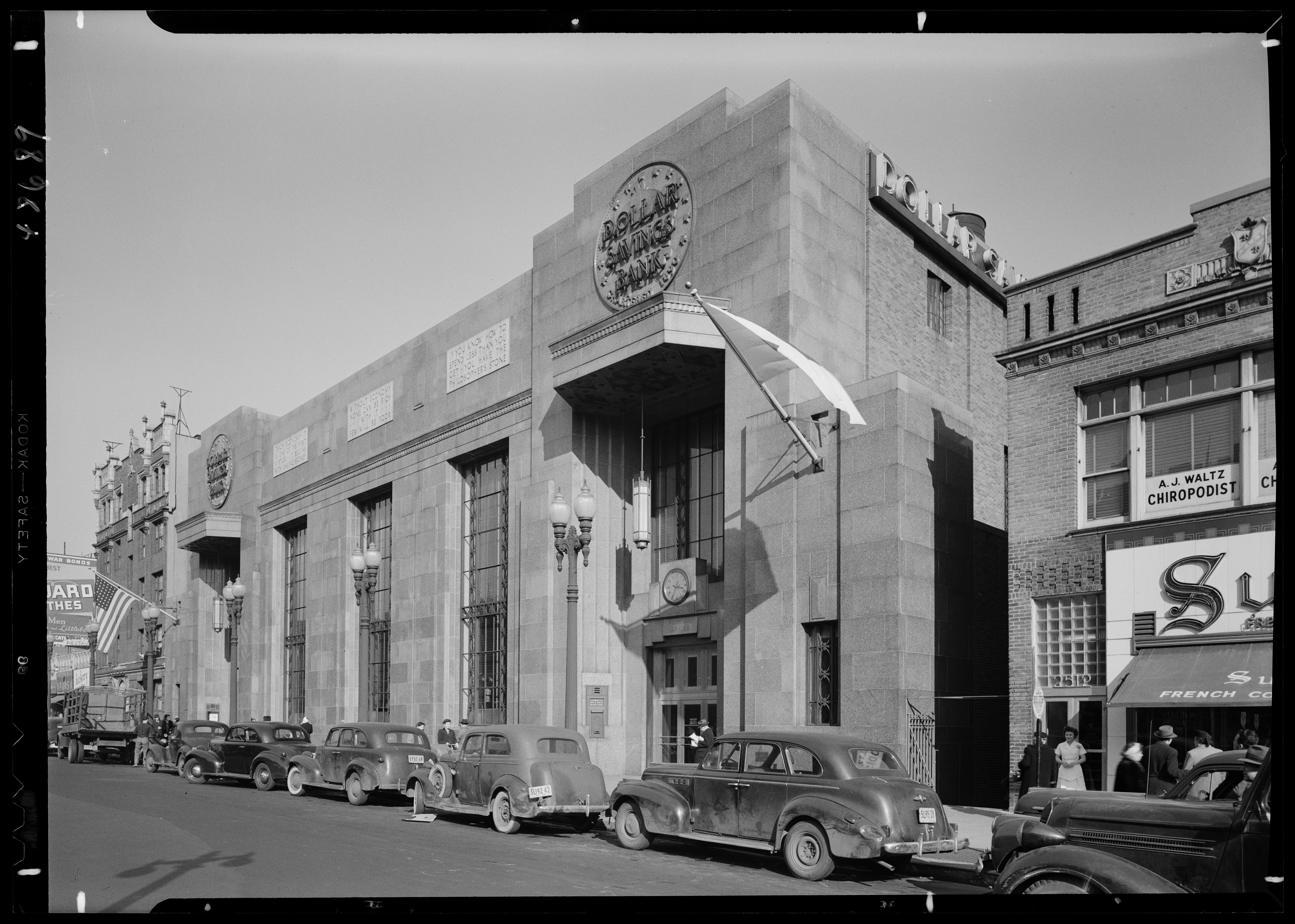
The banking hall wing prior to the 1949–1952 expansion

The Dollar Savings Bank merged in 1932 with the Fordham Savings Bank, which had a branch at 2480 Grand Concourse near Fordham Road. To accommodate the extra business, the Dollar Savings Bank acquired a nearby lot that September. The Dollar Savings Bank announced plans that December for a brick-and-stone branch on a 50-by-100-foot (15 by 30 m) site facing Grand Concourse, near Fordham Road. Designed by Halsey, McCormack & Helmer, the bank was to cost $250,000 (equivalent to $4.7 million in 2024). The building was to have 6,000 safe-deposit boxes, a Diebold Safe & Lock Co. safe, and a 72-by-47-foot (22 by 14 m) banking room. A three-story apartment building was demolished to make way for the new bank building, which began construction in November 1932 and was completed in October 1933.

Howell Taylor Manson acquired three additional land lots to the north in 1934. In 1937, Manson hired Muller to design a 55-foot-tall (17 m) annex on a 150-by-100-foot (46 by 30 m) site adjoining the new branch. The branch office opened on December 10, 1938. The annex added a second entrance, a new-accounts department, 15 booths for patrons to rent safe deposit boxes, and 23 tellers' windows. By then, the bank had 132,000 customers and $119 million in total assets. The Dollar Savings Bank began selling insurance out of its Grand Concourse branch in 1941. After World War II, the Dollar Savings Bank expanded its business. It was the United States' sixth-largest savings bank by 1948, and the bank added several more branches in subsequent years. To accommodate this growth, the bank erected a ten-story office wing with a clock tower. This structure was expanded starting in 1949, and it was completed by 1952. The Grand Concourse building became Dollar Savings Bank's main branch in 1951.

=== 1960s to present ===
The Dollar Savings Bank became part of the Dollar Dry Dock Savings Bank in 1983, and Jefferson Realty Associates had obtained the office wing that decade. This brought the office wing and banking hall under different condominium ownership. The Dollar Dry Dock Savings Bank and its 21 branches were seized in 1992 by the New York State Banking Department, with the Federal Deposit Insurance Corporation named as receiver. The Grand Concourse branch came under the control of Emigrant Savings Bank, which bought all Dollar Dry Dock branches except one in Flushing, Queens. By that year, the building was being considered for designation as a New York City designated landmark. Local companies occupied the tower's space. The New York City Landmarks Preservation Commission designated the building as a landmark on July 19, 1994; this designation includes both the exterior and the banking hall's interior.

Emigrant Savings Bank proposed splitting into four regional subsidiaries in 2005; as part of this division, the Grand Concourse bank branch would become the headquarters of the Bronx–Westchester subsidiary, which had eight branches. That year, social service agency Family Support Systems Unlimited bought the tower; Family Support Systems later went bankrupt, and by the 2010s the tower was derelict, with broken clock faces. The writer Avery Corman emailed Bronx borough president Rubén Díaz Jr. about the broken clock, to no avail. Jefferson Realty Associates said that repairing the clock would be expensive, that it was hard to find someone skilled enough to make repairs, and that people fired bullets at the clock at night after it had broken. Meanwhile, Emigrant Savings Bank sold most of its branches in 2012 to Apple Bank, which continued to operate a branch in the banking room.

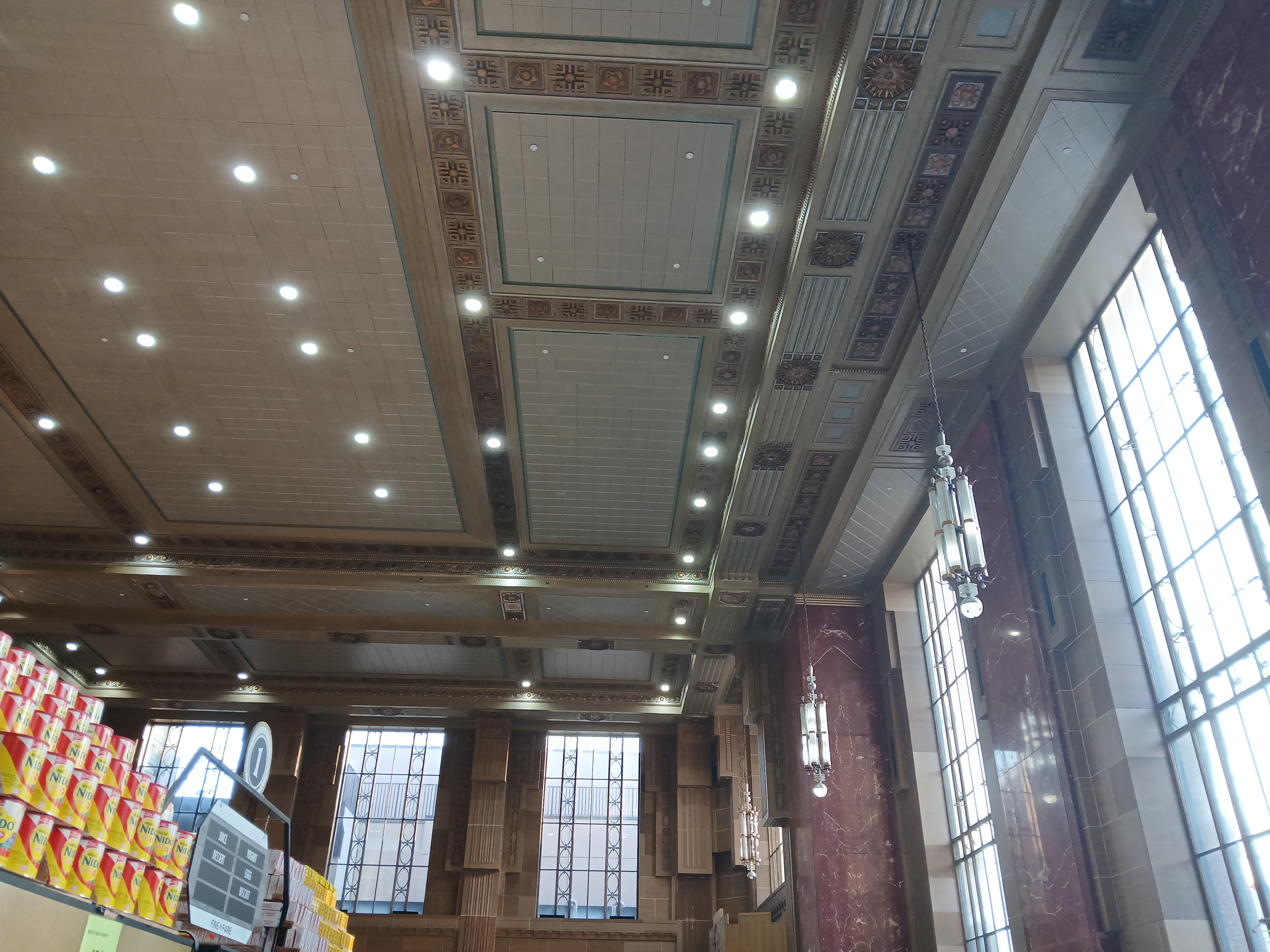
The banking hall in 2026, used as a Fine Fare supermarket

The developer Ivan Diaz (no relation to the borough president) bought the tower portion for $4 million and the low-rise banking room for $2 million in 2013. By then, Apple Bank was in the middle of moving out; the branch closed in 2014, and the banking hall was subsequently vacant. Maddd Equities hired Aufgang Architects to restore the interior, and the banking hall became a Fine Fare supermarket in 2024. The building was listed on the National Register of Historic Places on November 18, 2024. The next year, Lehman College of the City University of New York agreed to lease part of the building as a 184-bed dormitory. The college's dormitory, Lehman Grand, opened in August 2026.

== Reception ==
When plans for the building were announced, Bankers' Magazine wrote that the structure was to be "modernistic in style and at the same time retain enough of the conservative to be appropriate to the dignity of banking quarters". The New York Herald Tribune wrote that the building "sounds a distinct note of progress, both in architecture and banking facilities". The historian Anthony Robins wrote in 2017 that "though the bank looks all of a piece, it has a complicated history" and that the tower was visible from several miles away.

== See also ==
- List of New York City Designated Landmarks in the Bronx
- National Register of Historic Places listings in the Bronx
- Similar 1920s and 1930s bank buildings in New York City:
  - Apple Bank Building
  - Bowery Savings Bank Building (42nd Street)
  - Greenwich Savings Bank Building

== Sources ==
- Dollar Savings Bank Building (PDF) (Report). New York City Landmarks Preservation Commission. July 19, 1994.
- Dollar Savings Bank Building Interior (PDF) (Report). New York City Landmarks Preservation Commission. July 19, 1994.
- Dollar Savings Bank (Report). National Register of Historic Places, National Park Service. November 18, 2024. Report hosted on cris.parks.ny.gov (On "Search" tab: Criteria → Lookup → National Register number: 24NR00063).
