= Greenwich Savings Bank Building =

Historic bank building in Manhattan, New York

- Greenwich Savings Bank
- U.S. National Register of Historic Places
- New York State Register of Historic Places
- New York City Landmark
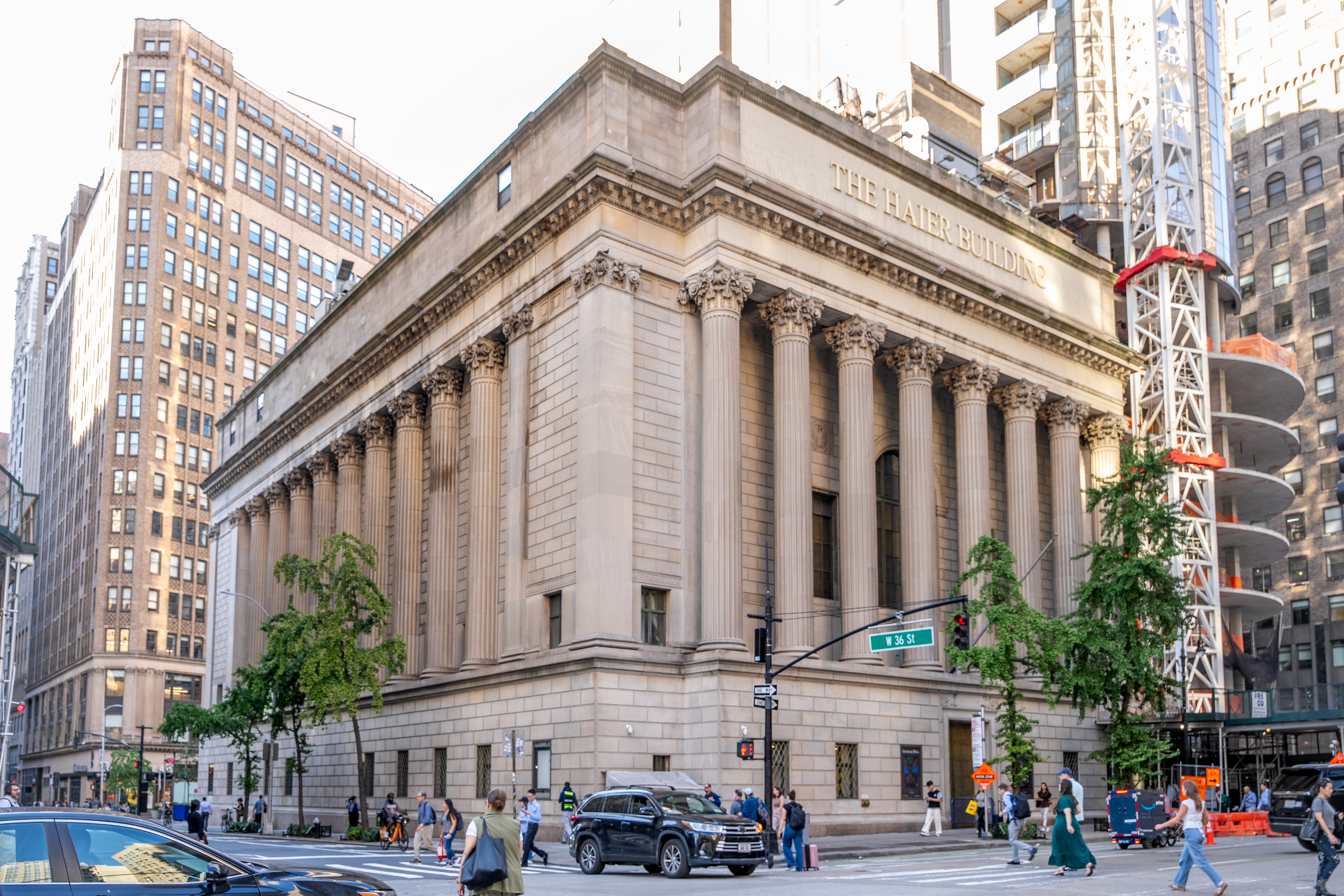
- Sixth Avenue facade (2025)
- Location: 1352–1362 Broadway, Manhattan, New York
- Coordinates: 40°45′05″N 73°59′14″W
- Built: 1922
- Architect: York & Sawyer
- Architectural style: Classical Revival
- NRHP reference No.: 05001286
- NYSRHP No.: 06101.008325
- NYCL No.: 1766, 1767

Significant dates
- Added to NRHP: November 16, 2005
- Designated NYSRHP: September 20, 2005
- Designated NYCL: March 3, 1992

The Greenwich Savings Bank Building, also known as the Haier Building and 1356 Broadway, is an office building at 1352–1362 Broadway in the Midtown Manhattan neighborhood of New York City. Constructed as the headquarters of the Greenwich Savings Bank from 1922 to 1924, it occupies a trapezoidal parcel bounded by 36th Street to the south, Sixth Avenue to the east, and Broadway to the west. The Greenwich Savings Bank Building was designed in the Classical Revival style by York and Sawyer.

The exterior, wrapping around the three sides of the building, consists of a base of rusticated stone blocks, atop which are Corinthian-style colonnades. Structurally, the building consists of a steel frame. Inside is an elliptical banking room with limestone Corinthian columns, granite walls, a marble floor, and a coffered, domed ceiling with a large skylight. The bronze tellers' screens contain sculptures of Minerva (symbolizing wisdom) and Mercury (representing commerce).

The Greenwich Savings Bank Building opened in May 1924 and operated as the headquarters of that bank until 1981. Afterward, the building was occupied by other banks for two decades. The building was purchased by Chinese appliance company Haier in 2001 and soon afterward was renamed for Haier. The banking space was turned into an event space called Gotham Hall, while Haier occupied the basement through 2014. The building's facade and lobby were made New York City designated landmarks in 1992, and the building was added to the National Register of Historic Places in 2005.

== Site ==
The Greenwich Savings Bank Building is on the northern side of 36th Street, running the entire block between Sixth Avenue (Avenue of the Americas) to the east and Broadway to the west, in the Midtown Manhattan neighborhood of New York City. The building's lot covers 17,600 square feet (1,640 m^{2}). The building has a frontage of about 106 feet (32 m) on Broadway, 159 feet (48 m) on 36th Street, and 99 feet (30 m) on Sixth Avenue. Because Broadway runs diagonally to the Manhattan street grid, the lot is trapezoidal, with the western facade on Broadway running at an irregular angle.

Prior to the construction of the Greenwich Savings Bank Building, the two-story Sheridan Building occupied the site. The land was owned by the Van Ingen estate immediately before the bank purchased it in 1921. The neighborhood had become dense after World War I with the construction of hotels and stores, as well as the development of what is now the Garment District of Manhattan. The site to the south once contained the New York Herald Building, the Renaissance Revival-style headquarters of the New York Herald. Because the Herald Building had a loading dock on 36th Street, the bank's design does not include any entrances from 36th Street to alleviate congestion there.

== Architecture ==
The Greenwich Savings Bank Building was designed by bank architects York and Sawyer in a Classical Revival style, with a limestone and sandstone exterior. It was built by Marc Eidlitz & Son. The building consists of six stories above a basement, with a steel-framed internal superstructure. When the building was erected in the 1920s, freestanding bank buildings in New York City were becoming more prevalent, and many such structures were being constructed with classical design details. According to the New York City Department of City Planning, the building has a gross floor area of 76,804 square feet (7,135.3 m^{2}).

At the building's opening, The Wall Street Journal dubbed it "a wonderful piece of architectural work". Architect magazine wrote, "it seems worth while [sic] to express appreciation of all those concerned in the construction of the bank and in the furnishing of all its varied details".

=== Facade ===
Wrapping around three sides of the building, the facade consists of a base of rusticated pink granite walls, above which are Corinthian-style columns. The main facade of the Greenwich Savings Bank Building is on Broadway, where there is a projecting rusticated podium, a portico, and an attic. The Sixth Avenue facade, at the rear, is similar to the Broadway facade but is slightly narrower because the Sixth Avenue frontage is the shortest of the three street frontages. The building is 80 feet (24 m) tall, equal to a six- or seven-story building, but when completed it was smaller than many neighboring buildings.

==== Base ====
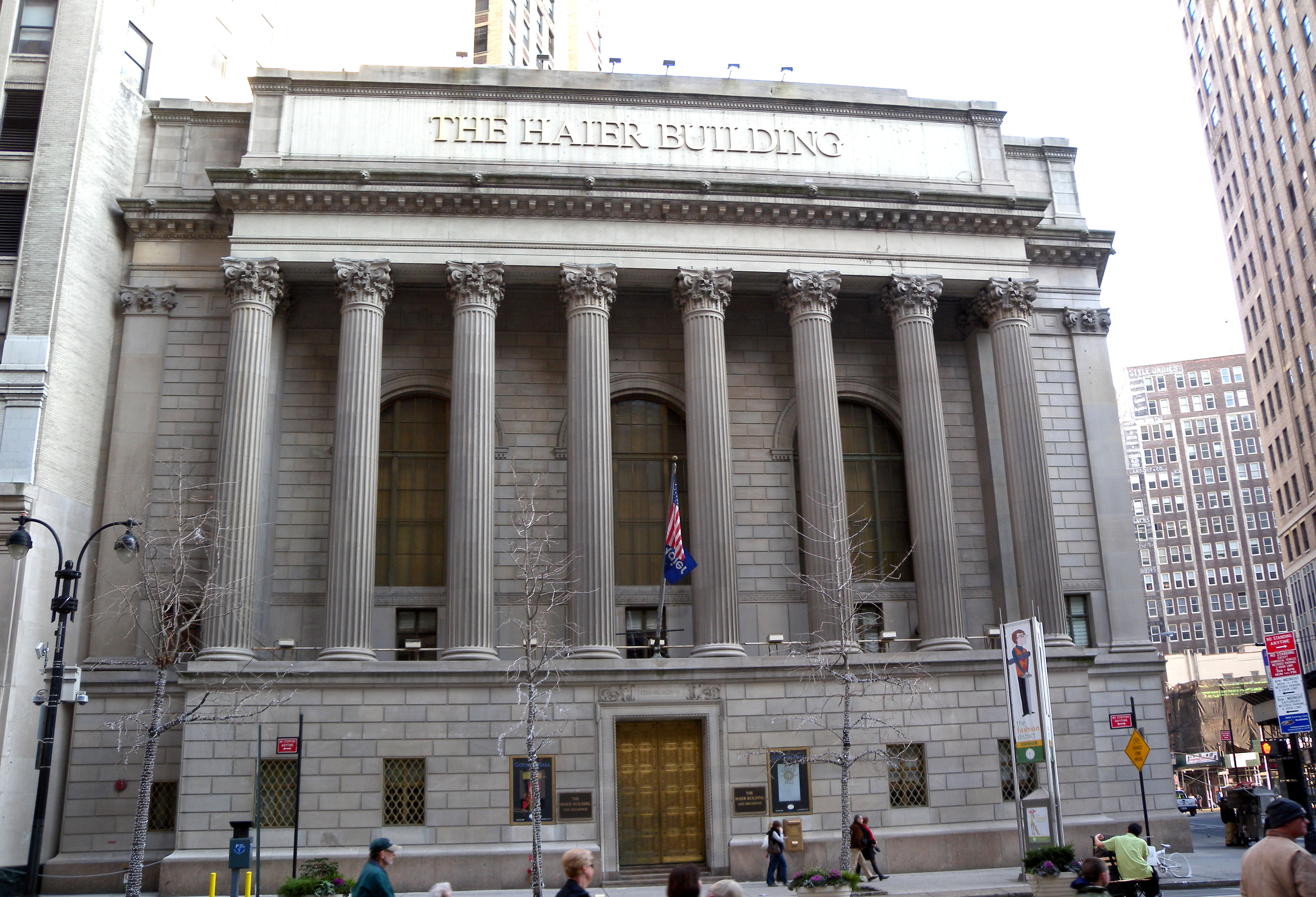
Seen from Broadway

At the center of the Broadway facade is an entryway with a molded surround approached by four steps made of pink granite. The entrance doorway contains a double door made of bronze with classical reliefs. The soffits under the doorway have square and rectangular molded panels. An electric sign is hung beneath the top of the entryway. An eared tablet with the carved words 1356 broadway is inscribed above the top of the entryway, flanked by carved griffins. There were once metal plaques with the owner's name on either side of the doorway. On either side of the entryway are three window openings. The opening closest to the entrance on each side contains bronze frames. The two outer openings on each side contain iron grills over them, surrounded by brass frames.

On 36th Street, there are ten windows, grouped as five each on the west and east ends of the facade. The eight inner windows contain iron grills above them. There are no doors on 36th Street.

On Sixth Avenue, the base is largely similar to that on Broadway. There is a molded doorway and bronze double doors near the center of this facade. Because the site slopes upward slightly toward the east, there are no stairs in front of this doorway. In addition, the eared tablet above the Sixth Avenue facade instead bears the carved word 985 sixth ave. There are three windows on either side of the doorway, the outer two of which have iron grills and the inner of which has bronze frames. South of the projecting podium is a single window at ground level. Because of the narrower width, there is no corresponding window on the northern end of the Sixth Avenue facade, which instead has an employee entrance and bronze gate.

==== Colonnades ====
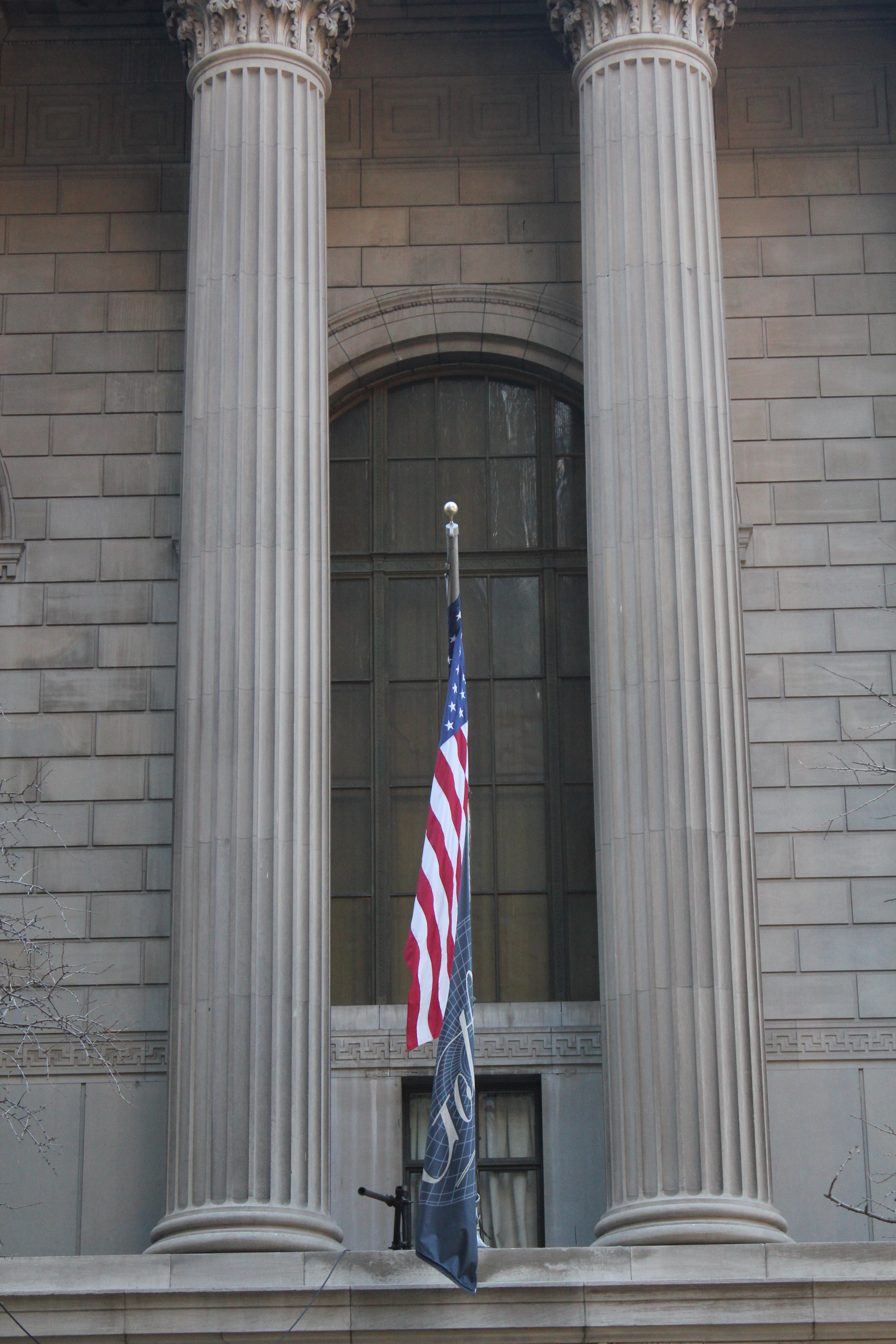
Detail of columns and arched window on Broadway

All three sides contain fluted Corinthian columns that measure about 40 feet (12 m) high and about 5 feet (1.5 m) in diameter. On Broadway, above the first-floor podium, is a Corinthian octastyle, a portico with eight columns. Behind the colonnade, the ceiling of the portico is divided into coffers. Behind the colonnade are rusticated blocks, as well as three large arched windows topped by archivolts. There are antae and unfluted pilasters on either side of the octastyle. The bottom of the colonnade consists of a dado, which corresponds to the second floor and is topped by a fret design. The dado contains five rectangular windows: three corresponding to the arches above them and two outside the colonnade. An entablature, with an architrave and frieze, runs above the columns and pilasters, wrapping around to the other two facades. Above that is a cornice with modillions, as well as cymatium containing lions' heads.

On 36th Street, the colonnade consists of nine engaged columns, which are all fluted. To either side of the engaged columns are unfluted pilasters. A dado runs across the second floor and contains eight windows, four on each end of the 36th Street facade. On each end, the windows are arranged as one between the pilasters and three beside the outermost fluted columns. When the Greenwich Savings Bank Building had been designed, the bank's building committee had decided it would be better to articulate the 36th Street facade with engaged columns instead of flat pilasters.

On Sixth Avenue, the colonnade is also an octastyle, and the ceiling of the portico is coffered. However, the arrangement of windows behind the colonnade is different from that on Broadway. Within the dado, there are four rectangular windows, two each on the extreme ends of the facade. Above is a single arched window with an archivolt, which is flanked by a pair of rectangular windows. There are antae and unfluted pilasters only on the south side of the octastyle.

==== Attic ====
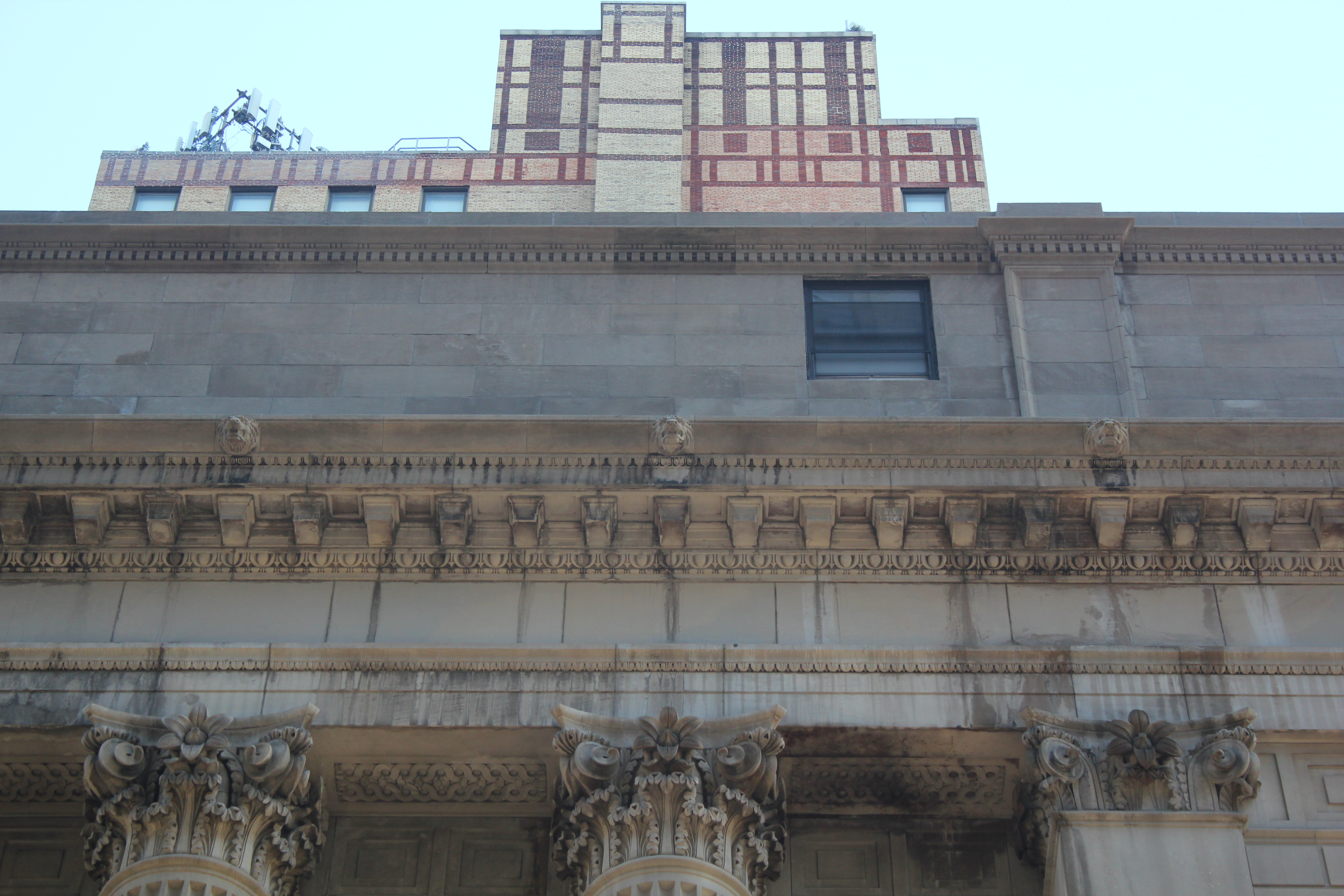
Attic on 36th Street

On Broadway, the attic is faced with smooth limestone. The attic once contained letters with the bank's name on them, which were replaced by those of later owners. A long inscription above the attic on Broadway welcomed bank visitors. (Note: An inaccurate inscription is given by Architecture 1924, p. 273.) This inscription was written by the Rev. Russell Bowie, who at the time of the building's opening served as Grace Church's rector. A similar modification has been made on the Sixth Avenue facade, which also had letters with the bank's name on them. There is also a covered inscription on the Sixth Avenue facade, a sentence about the building's founding and previous locations. Above the attic is a denticulated cornice.

On 36th Street, the attic contains raised panels on the outer ends of that facade. The panels are aligned with the pilasters in the building's intermediate story. Three windows were installed on the attic sometime between 1967 and 1971 to allow computers to be installed in the attic. One window is installed between each set of pilasters, while the third window is installed above the leftmost column of the colonnade.

=== Interior ===
==== Vestibules ====
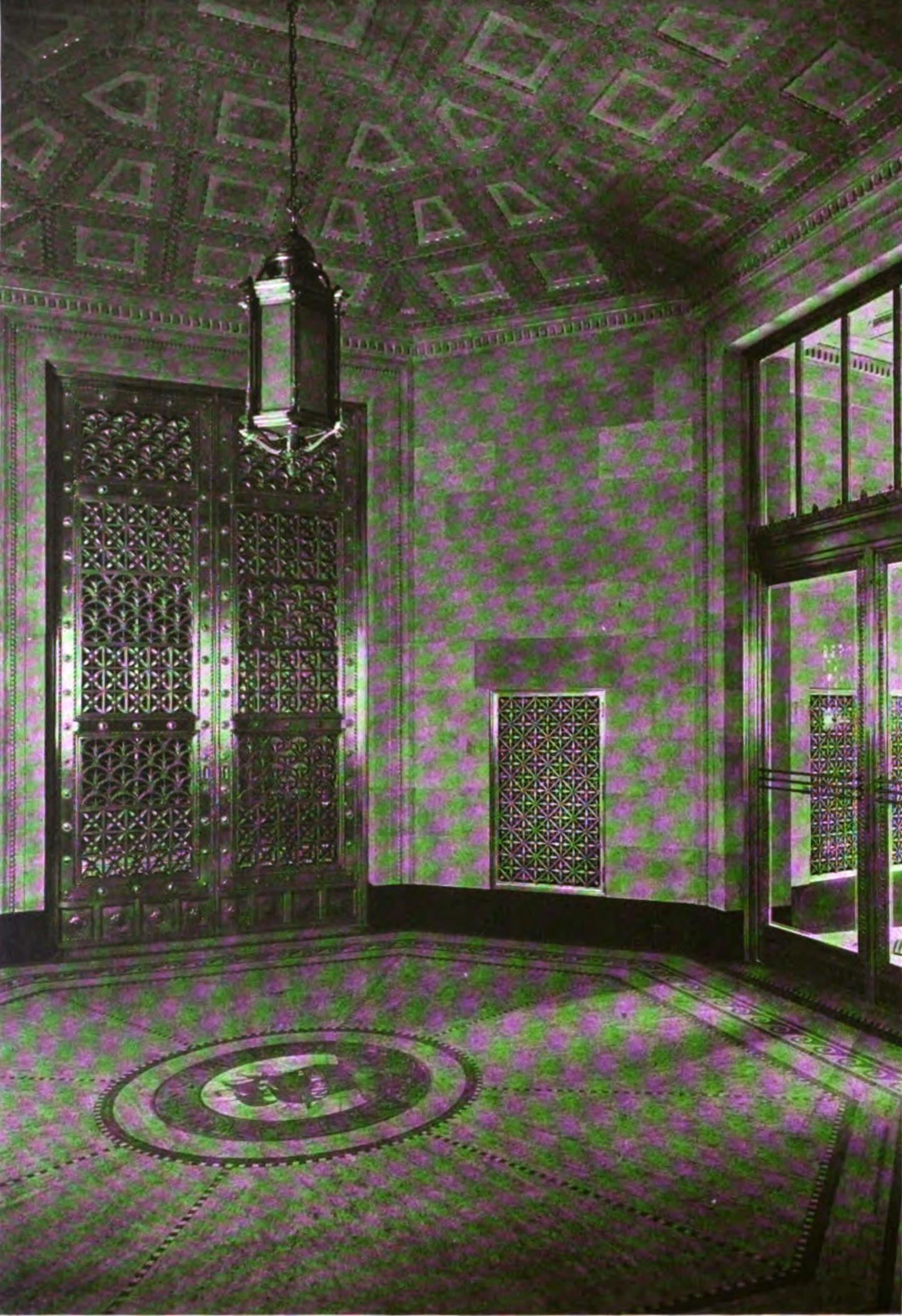
Digitized photo of the Broadway foyer

On the west side of the ground floor, leading from Broadway, is a vestibule shaped as an irregular octagon. This vestibule has a travertine marble floor that is bordered by Belgian black marble. A strip of black-and-white tesserae and a double strip of black tesserae run around the black marble floor. The center of the floor surface has a lozenge measuring 29 by 31 inches (740 by 790 mm), which has a depiction of a black-tesserae triton within a green-and-white marble background and a black-and-white tesserae border. The walls have wrought bronze radiator grills. Above the double door facing Broadway is a transom window with five panes. The ceiling is made of plaster and has shallow coffers. The vestibule on the east side of the ground floor, leading from Sixth Avenue, has nearly identical materials to the Broadway vestibule, but with taller dimensions. The Sixth Avenue vestibule is also cruciform and symmetrical, rather than being irregularly shaped.

From the Broadway entrance vestibule, a revolving door leads east to another octagonal space, a foyer. This room has a symmetrical shape consisting of alternating longer and shorter sides, with the longer sides corresponding to the four cardinal directions. The foyer floor is made of travertine with tesserae. The center of the floor surface has a medallion showing a brass ship on green marble waves, surrounded by the name of the bank. The foyer has a limestone wall interspersed with sandstone to create a warm tone. While the west wall has the revolving door, the walls to the north, south, and east have heavy decorative bronze grills. The shorter walls, which correspond to the intercardinal directions (northwest, northeast, southwest, southeast), contain radiator grills, above which are capitalized inscriptions with gold fillings. The ceiling design consists of a square at the center, with a rosette as well as a hexagonal lantern hanging from the rosette.

South of the Broadway foyer is an irregularly shaped space that was used as a comptroller's office. The comptroller's office has a coffered ceiling, moldings on the walls, two stone columns, and doorways from the foyer and banking room. North of the foyer is a stair hall with a coffered ceiling and smooth stone walls, which leads to a staircase with a barrel-vaulted ceiling. The western wall of this stair hall has a vestibule leading to the boardroom; this vestibule has wooden walls and a plaster ceiling. In both the stair hall and the boardroom vestibule, the floor is tiled similarly to in the Broadway foyer.

==== Banking room ====
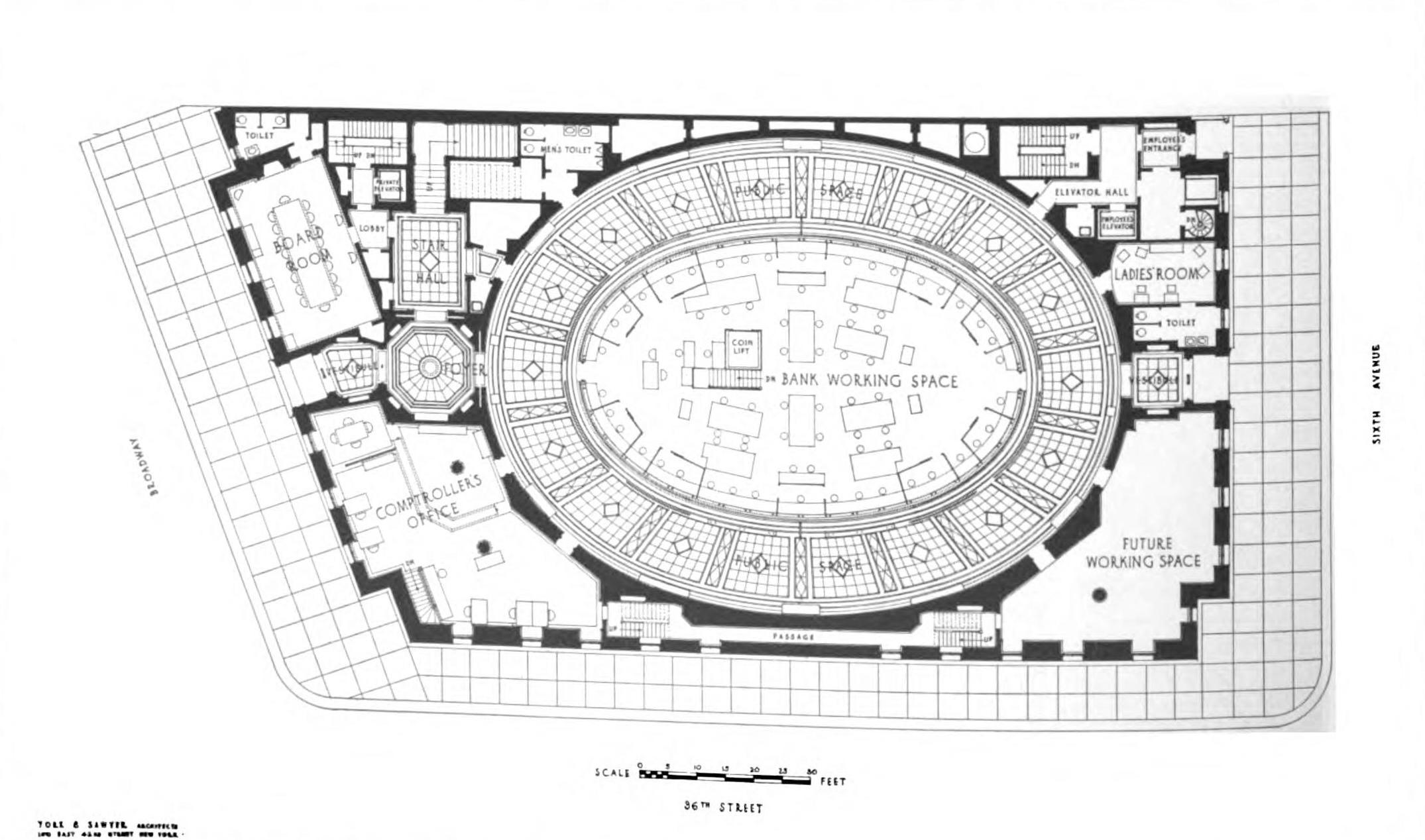
First-floor layout, depicting the banking room at center right, with the Broadway vestibule and foyer at left and the Sixth Avenue vestibule at right

The elliptical banking room was designed to maximize space usage in the trapezoidal lot. It is accessed from the Broadway vestibule on the west and the Sixth Avenue vestibule on the east. Its location was intended to allude to a central working space. This room measures about 160 feet (49 m) long on its west–east axis and 88 feet (27 m) wide on its north–south axis. (Note: According to early plans, the room was to be 120 by 87 feet (37 by 27 m) long.) The floors are paved in marble with numerous contrasting colors, in a pattern intended to resemble antique pavement. The borders are made of black and buff mosaic tiles, and the floor tiles are divided into panels with sea-green lozenges and black mosaic at their centers. The tellers' counter, at the center of the room, is made of black and gold marble, surmounted by a bronze counter screen with a gold finish. The tellers' counter is supported by numerous sculptural pairs of Minerva (symbolizing wisdom) and Mercury (representing commerce), which are regularly spaced. Around the perimeter of the room are four desks and four counters atop bronze brackets, with beveled-glass tabletops. There are also eleven benches with decorative bronze legs.

A podium made of rusticated limestone and sandstone runs around the banking room. Eight sconces are mounted on the podium, four each on the north and south walls. The west and east walls have a Corinthian loggia atop the podium, similar to the exterior. There are paneled bronze double doors under either loggia, each of which is flanked by a pair of bronze torch lamps. The columns and antae above each set of doors are made of limestone, and the capitals of each column are fabricated of cast stone. The columns rise about 32 feet (9.8 m). Between each pair of columns are bronze balustrade panels that contain diagonal "X" patterns. Behind these loggias are the Broadway and Sixth Avenue mezzanines. On both the north and south walls, between the loggias, are five blind window openings above the fret. Two of these blind openings are topped by tablets with inscriptions relating to thrift.

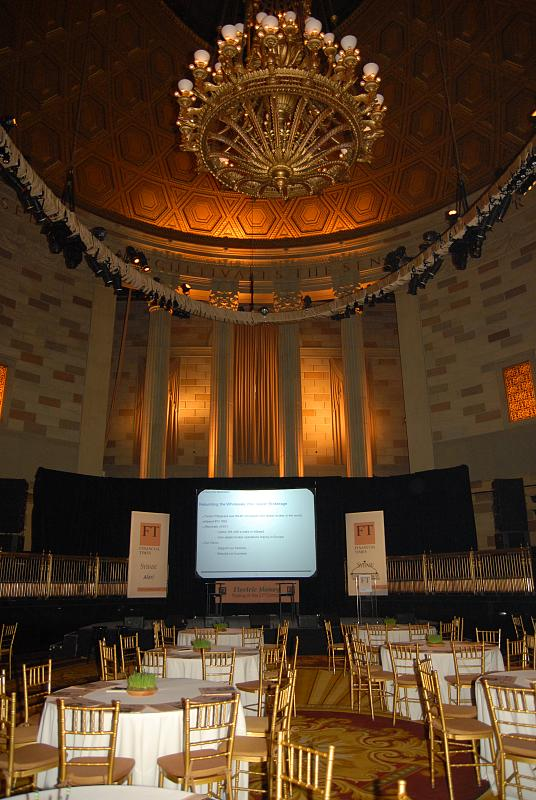
Former banking room, used as the Gotham Hall event space

A cast stone frieze, with motifs of swags and a candelabra, runs near the top of the wall. An entablature with another inscription runs just beneath the ceiling. The ceiling is composed of a coffered plaster dome hanging from a steel frame. At the center of the ceiling is a light diffuser with a bronze chandelier hanging from it. The space is illuminated by skylight measuring 66 feet (20 m) long and 35 feet (11 m) wide. Several small trolleys were hung from the ceiling to assist in cleaning the skylight. The skylight is about 72 feet (22 m) above the floor at its highest point.

==== Other spaces ====
Besides the foyers, vestibules, and banking room, the Greenwich Savings Bank Building is composed of a basement and six office stories. The basement was described as containing lockers, toilets, storage, and other rooms primarily found in a regular savings bank. The vault was reached directly from the stair hall on the north side of the Broadway vestibule, with a coin lift and a stair down to vault level. The vault door, weighing 40 short tons (36 long tons; 36 t) with a thickness of 3 feet (0.91 m), was designed by Frederick S. Holmes and was the second-largest in the United States at the time of the building's completion, surpassed only by the Federal Reserve Bank of Cleveland's vault. There was a telephone and small emergency exit in the vault. The vault still existed by the 2000s, but the layout of the basement had changed drastically.

Two mezzanines were placed at the second story, one each on Broadway and Sixth Avenue. The bank officers' workspaces were placed on the Broadway mezzanine, since the officers did not require immediate access to the banking facility. The north wall of the Broadway mezzanine connects to the barrel-vaulted staircase that leads from the Broadway vestibule. The space has three walls with wooden wainscoting on the north, south, and west, while the east wall overlooks the banking hall loggia. The wainscoting only rises to the lower edge of the large arched windows that face Broadway. The remainder of the walls are clad in rusticated stone, with metal grilles in the window opening, while the ceiling has coffers. There is a room with a fireplace, wood-paneled walls, and doors to other rooms on the south side of the Broadway mezzanine. The president's room was in the southwest corner of that mezzanine, while the committee room adjoined it.

The Sixth Avenue mezzanine is similar but simpler in design to the Broadway mezzanine. The windows lack grills, the ceiling lacks coffers, and the north and south walls lead to other rooms, elevators, and fire stairs.

The other floors contained various spaces. There was a kitchen and pantry on the north side of the sixth floor, above the banking room, which served two officers' dining rooms facing Broadway and an employees' dining room facing Sixth Avenue. There was also a rest area for the clerks. The dining rooms and rest area opened onto the rooftop where there was an open space for employee leisure. There was also a dormitory area for workers. By the 2000s, the third and fifth stories were used only for storage. The fourth story had one small office and the sixth story had several offices, but these were completely redesigned from their original detail.

== History ==
The Greenwich Savings Bank was founded in 1833 and was originally headquartered at 10–12 Carmine Street near Sixth Avenue in Greenwich Village, Manhattan. The original headquarters was relocated in 1839 to 11 Sixth Avenue. The bank further relocated in 1846 to 41 Sixth Avenue and in 1854 to 71-75 Sixth Avenue. In 1892 the bank moved to the intersection of Sixth Avenue and 16th Street, further north in Chelsea. (Note: The house numbers have since been adjusted, so the old Sixth Avenue addresses are no longer the current addresses.) By the 1920s, development was moving northward in Manhattan, and the bank wanted a new site that was centrally located, in anticipation of further growth.

=== Development ===
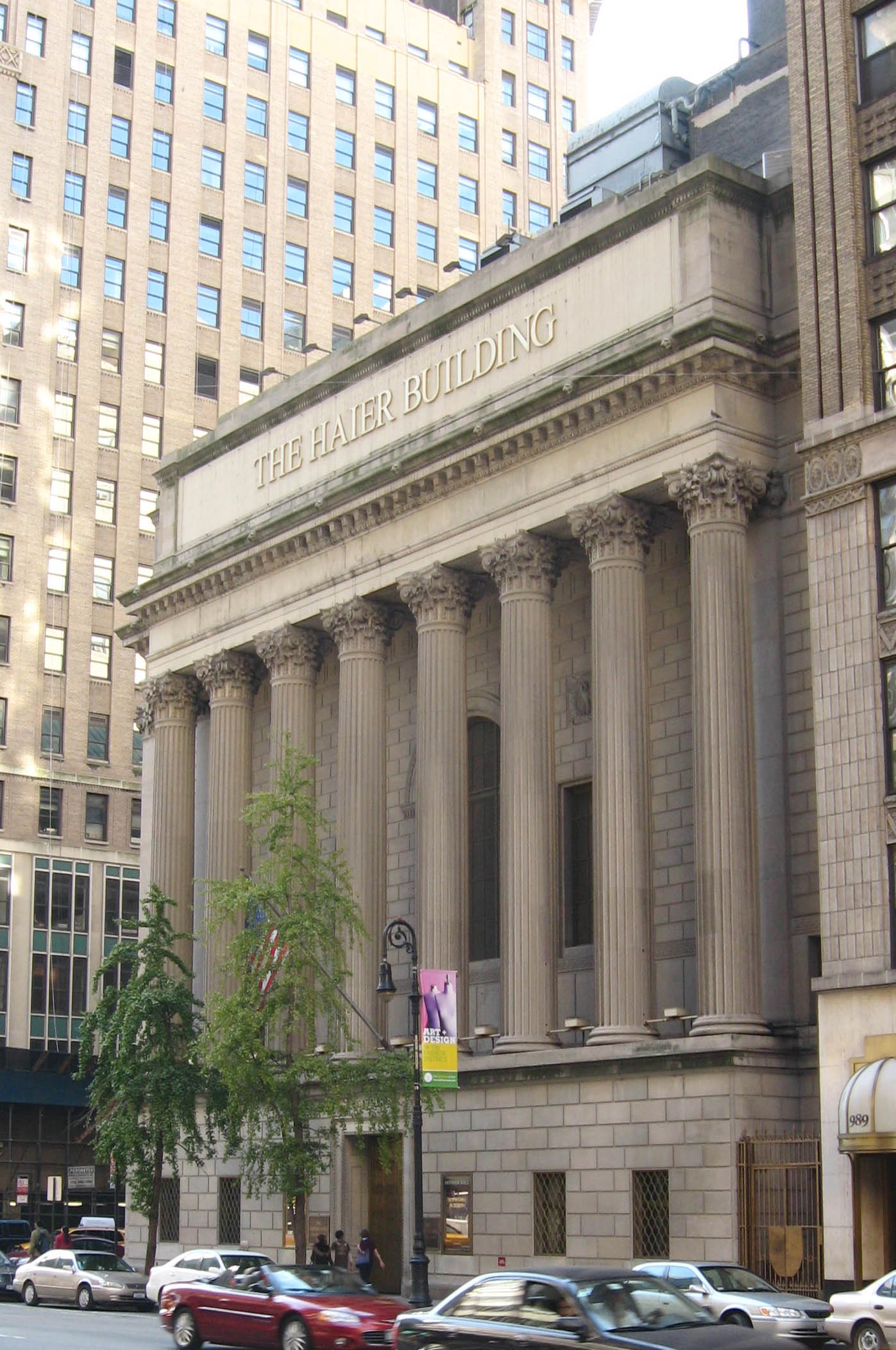
Seen on Sixth Avenue

In early 1921, the Greenwich Savings Bank purchased land at Broadway and 36th Street in midtown for about $1.4 million. The next year, a building committee had been organized to determine a design for the structure. The committee had decided to create a building with many elements in the Corinthian order. Furthermore, as the bank's headquarters had been on Sixth Avenue for nearly all of its history, the committee planned a facade to face Sixth Avenue as well. By early 1922, York and Sawyer were hired as architects while Marc Eidlitz & Son were awarded the general contract. York and Sawyer might have been selected because of their previous work with the bank's officers, albeit not necessarily in a banking context.

Work could not begin until existing tenants' leases expired on May 1, 1922. Afterward, demolition commenced on the existing structures at the site. The architect of record, Charles M. Dutcher of York and Sawyer, filed plans with the Manhattan Bureau of Building in June 1922 with the bank estimated to cost $1 million. The application described the building as one-and-two stories tall. Shortly after, a $500,000 loan was taken out on the building's construction. The cornerstone of the new building was ceremonially laid on December 6, 1922. By the next year, the columns were being erected. The new bank building was projected to be the second-largest in Midtown, after the Bowery Savings Bank building at 110 East 42nd Street. At the time, the Greenwich Savings Bank had 94,026 accounts and a combined $92 million.

By January 1924, the building was scheduled to open the following month. On May 17, 1924, two days before the new Broadway headquarters' opening, one hundred million dollars of the Greenwich Savings Bank's holdings were moved from the old headquarters, using armored cars guarded by heavily armed policemen. At the time, this represented the second most valuable movement of bank holdings in New York City history, behind only the relocation of the Bowery Savings Bank. Two days later, the Greenwich Savings Bank opened to the public. With the opening of the new headquarters, the previous headquarters became one of the bank's branches.

=== Use as bank ===
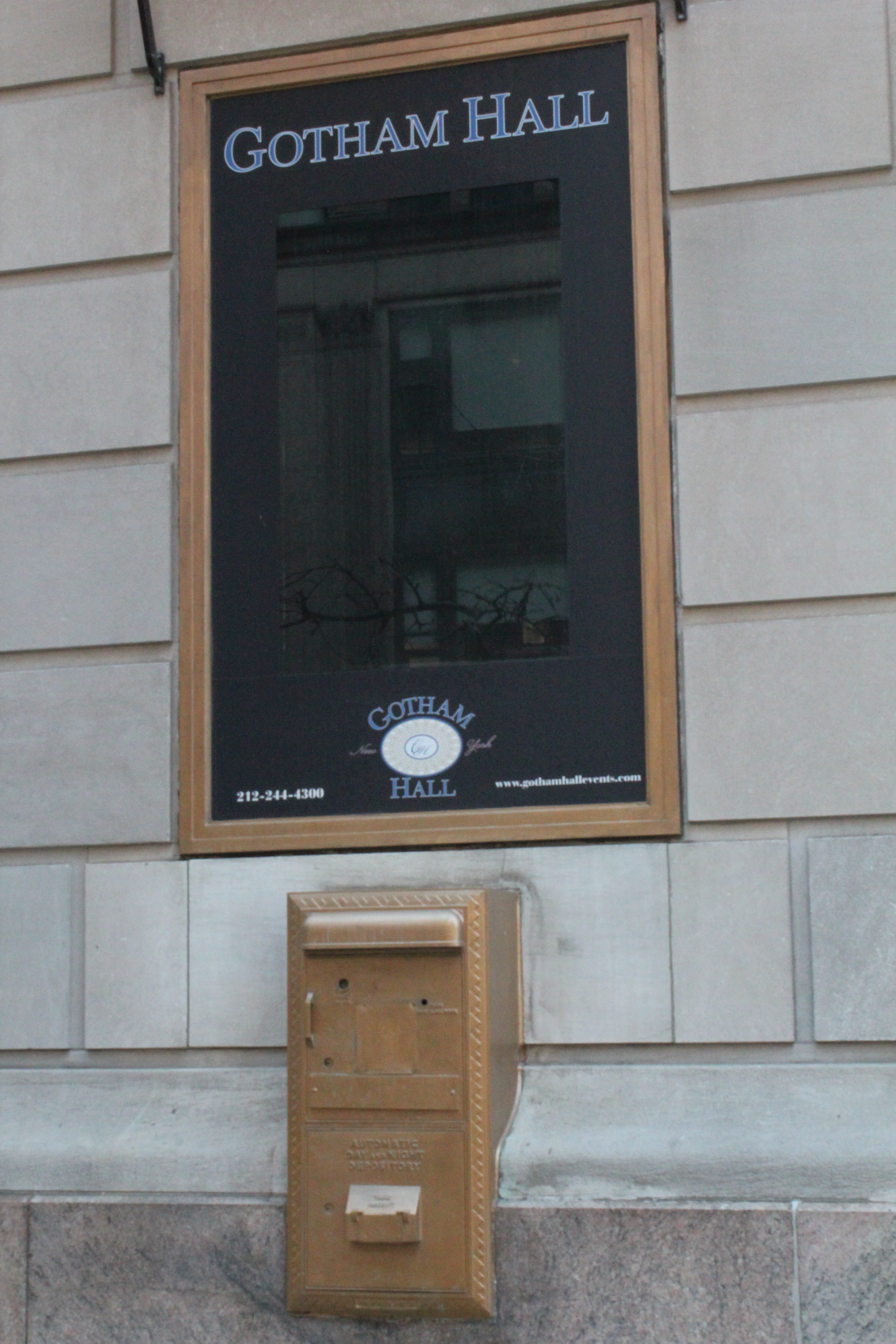
Bank drop-box below Gotham Hall sign on Broadway

At the Greenwich Savings Bank's hundredth anniversary, nine years after the new building's opening, the bank had 131,156 accounts and $154 million in deposits. York and Sawyer filed plans in 1940 to add office space to the Greenwich Savings Bank Building at a cost of $100,000. The new office space, equivalent to one-third of a full story, was to be constructed between the trusses that held up the ceiling of the banking area. The work was to be conducted by general contractor Eglehart, Caldwell & Scott Inc. as well as consulting engineers Meyer, Strong & Jones Inc. and H. Balcom Associates.

With bank deregulation in 1980, the Greenwich Savings Bank started having big losses and, in 1981, the Federal Deposit Insurance Corporation (FDIC) and the New York State Banking Department sought buyers for the bank. The building was then occupied in 1981 by the Metropolitan Savings Bank, followed in 1985 by the Crossland Savings Bank. With the closure or downsizing of bank branches in the late 20th century, the New York City Landmarks Preservation Commission (LPC) proposed designating several major bank interiors in 1990, including the Crossland Bank Building, the Manufacturers Hanover Building, and the Apple Bank for Savings Building. The building became a Crossland Federal Savings Bank branch in January 1992 after the FDIC seized the Crossland Savings Bank. The LPC designated the Greenwich Savings Bank Building and the interior banking hall as a landmark on March 3, 1992. By then, the building was owned by Gerald and Malcolm Rosenberg, who were recorded as being opposed to the landmark designation.

=== Office and event venue conversion ===
Leslie Wohlman Himmel and Stephen J. Meringoff of the firm Himmel & Meringoff Properties acquired the Greenwich Savings Bank Building in 1999 for an undisclosed sum. It had taken the company ten years to acquire the building's ownership, land lease, mortgages, and interior leases. The firm planned to rent out 47,000 square feet (4,400 m^{2}) in the building for $1.65 million per year, with a tenant who could sign a long-term triple net lease running for at least 10 years. They created several renderings for alternative uses of the banking hall, including an auditorium, trading floor, restaurant, and store. HSBC, which occupied the banking space, was planning to relocate to a much smaller space at 1350 Broadway. Himmel & Meringoff had not wanted to sell the building, but they were forced to reject several potential applicants for having insufficient credit.

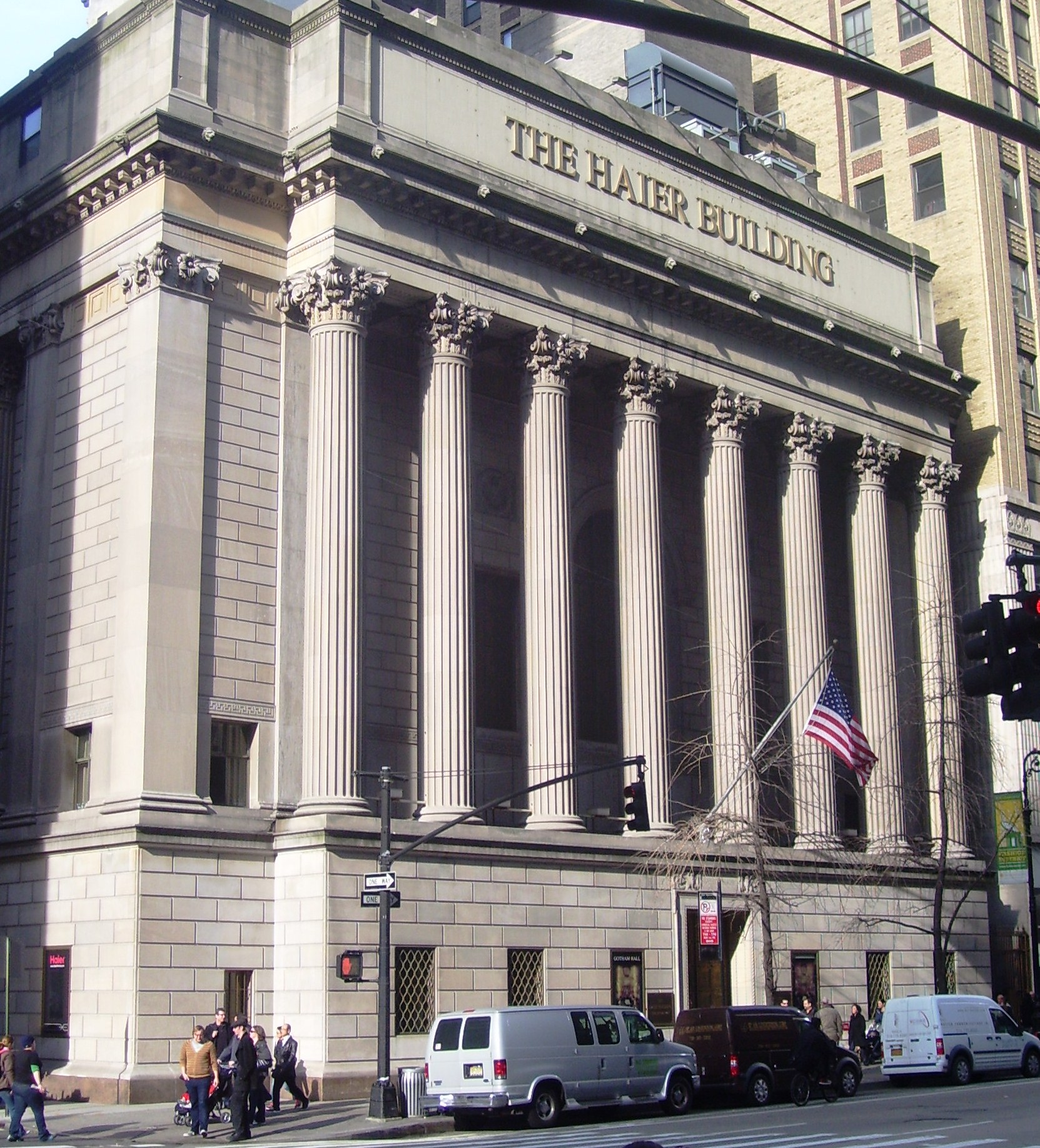
Seen in 2012

HSBC departed in May 2001, and Haier America, a subsidiary of the Chinese appliance company Haier, purchased the building the following month for $14 million. The sale excluded 235,000 square feet (21,800 m^{2}) of development rights associated with the building, which a buyer could potentially transfer to a nearby structure. Haier planned to operate a showroom and restaurant in the banking space, leasing the restaurant operations to another entity, and making 1356 Broadway the headquarters for its operations in the Americas. According to Haier America CEO Michael Jemal, the company wished to keep the interior publicly accessible. Gruzen Samton Architects was planning a renovation of the landmark interiors. In 2002, Haier renamed the structure the Haier Building. Haier installed its executive offices in the basement, as well as a reception area with a 122-bottle wine cellar. On the top floor, Haier displayed products to potential customers.

For a short time after its offices opened, Haier had used the banking area as a showroom for its products, including refrigerators and air conditioners; this use was seen as wasteful and, in August 2002, the company marketed the banking area as an event venue called Gotham Hall. An event management company was contracted to operate Gotham Hall and leased several of the Haier Building's large rooms through 2033. The old banking room, board room, and executive office were rented out for corporate events, private parties, and other functions. The events at Gotham Hall have attracted guests such as U.S. President Barack Obama, actress Eva Mendes, and fashion designer Tommy Hilfiger.

By 2004, Haier employed 120 people in the building. To prevent pigeon droppings, the owners installed bird-trap cages on the facade, which prompted investigations from the American Society for the Prevention of Cruelty to Animals. The building was listed on the National Register of Historic Places on November 16, 2005. Haier moved its North American headquarters to Wayne, New Jersey, in 2014, relocating about 200 workers. The Haier Building was put up for sale in June 2015 for an unknown sum. The same year, Isaac Chetrit and Ray Yadidi bought the building's air rights for $26 million, intending to use the air rights for a project at 100 West 37th Street. The Haier Building was refinanced with a $23.8 million loan in early 2024; at the time, the structure was valued at $30.5 million, and its tenant, Gotham Hall, earned about $5.7 million annually.

== See also ==
- National Register of Historic Places listings in Manhattan from 14th to 59th Streets
- List of New York City Designated Landmarks in Manhattan from 14th to 59th Streets
- Dollar Savings Bank Building, another landmarked bank in New York City, built in the 1930s
- Other York and Sawyer banks in New York City
  - Brooklyn Trust Company Building
  - Federal Reserve Bank of New York Building
