= Greenwich Savings Bank =

American savings bank (1833–1981)

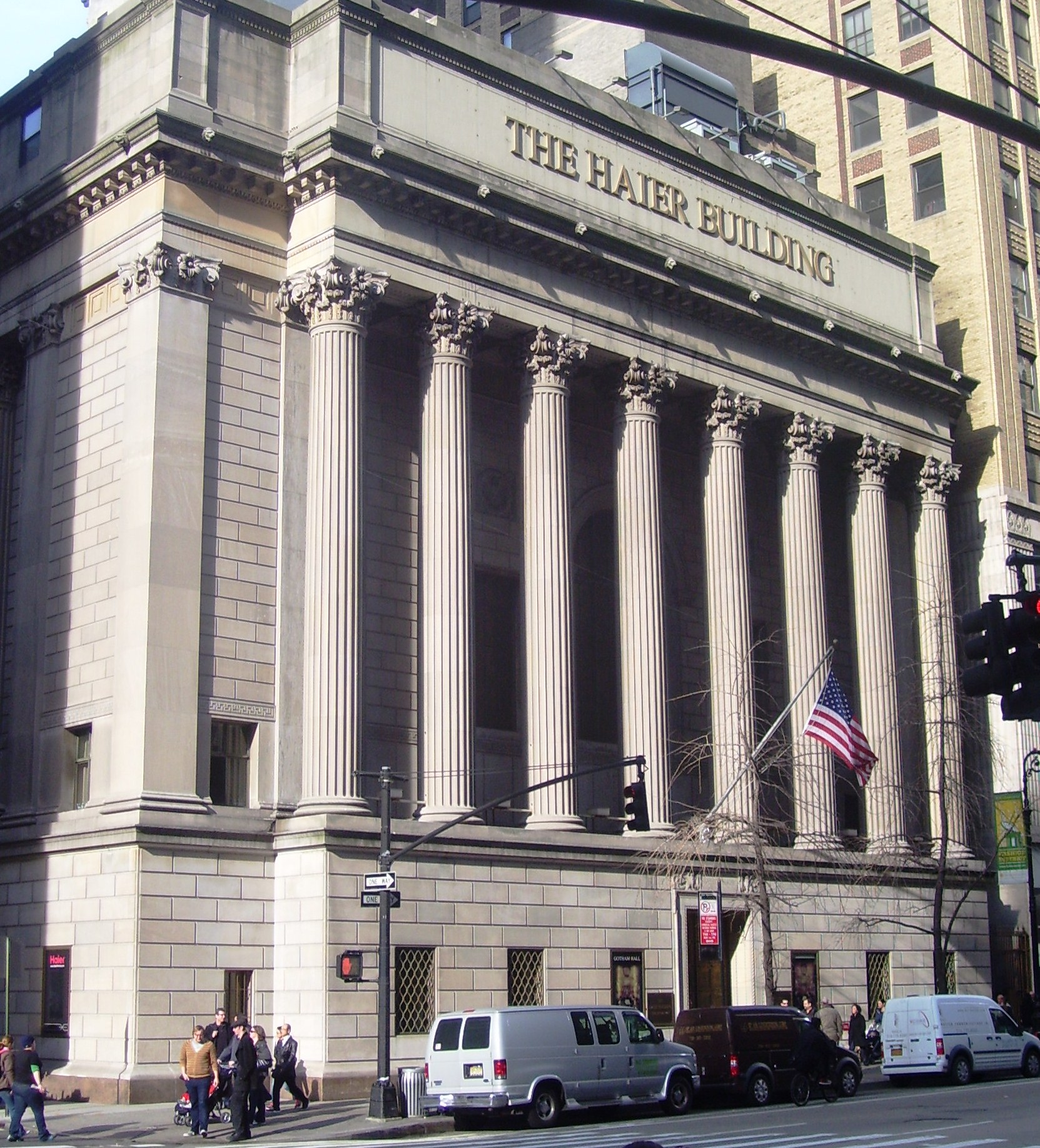
Sixth Avenue facade of the Greenwich Savings Bank Building at 1352-1362 Broadway, Manhattan, New York City

The Greenwich Savings Bank was an American savings bank based in New York City that operated from 1833 to 1981. At the time of its closure in 1981, it was the 16th largest bank in the U.S. by total deposits.

== History ==
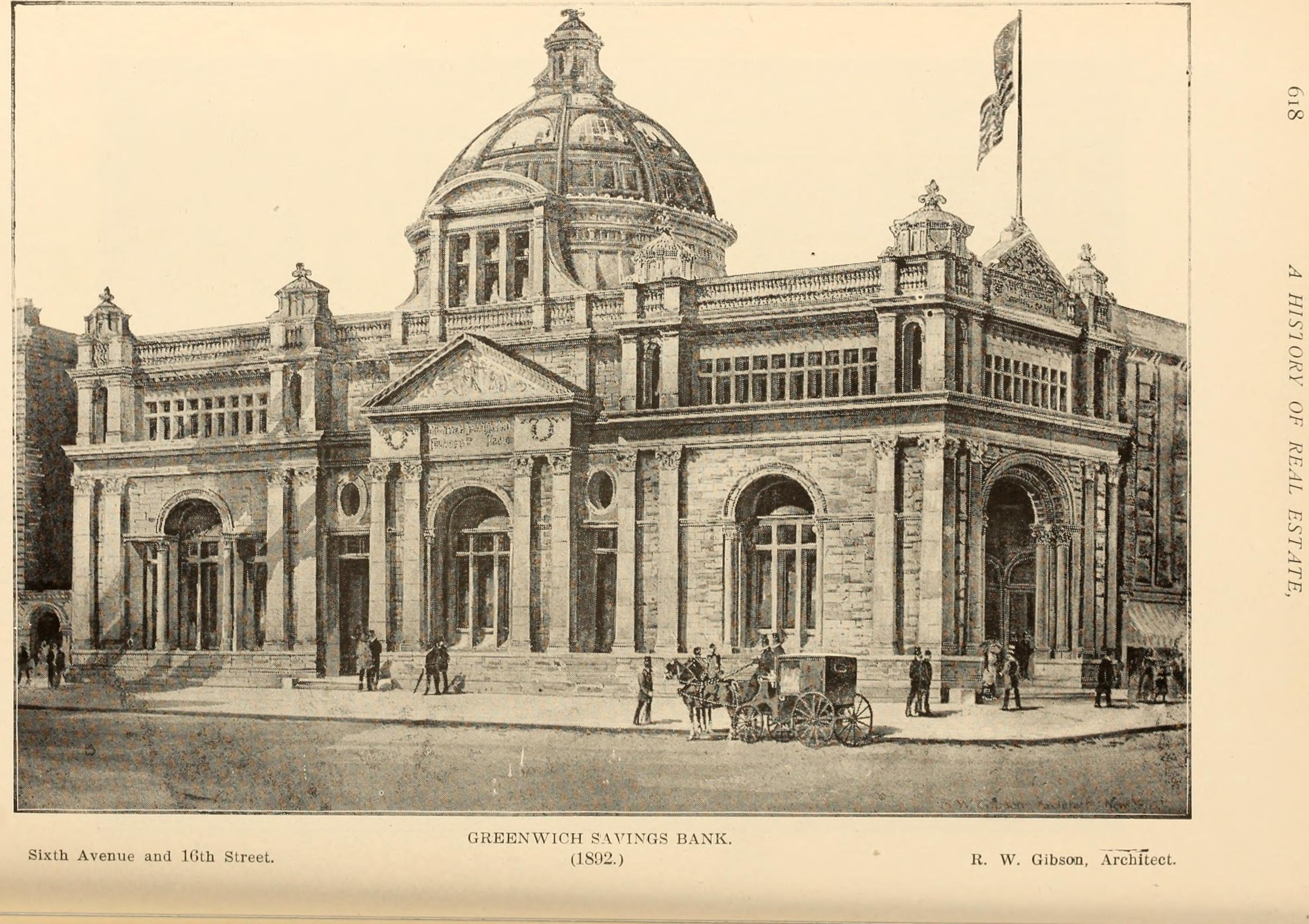
1892 headquarters

The Greenwich Savings Bank was chartered on July 1, 1833, in New York City. The bank was originally headquartered at 10-12 Carmine Street near Sixth Avenue in Greenwich Village, Manhattan. The original headquarters was relocated in 1839 to 11 Sixth Avenue. The bank further relocated in 1846 to 41 Sixth Avenue and in 1854 to 71-75 Sixth Avenue. In 1892 the bank moved to the intersection of Sixth Avenue and 16th Street, further north in Chelsea.

At its height, it had branches in New York City, Nassau County and Westchester County, with $2.5 billion in assets.

By the time of bank deregulation in 1980, the bank started having big losses. In 1981, the Federal Deposit Insurance Corporation (FDIC) and the New York State Banking Department sought buyers for the bank. In October of that year, a participant in a meeting about possible buyers left material on the meeting table. This information was given to The New York Times, which printed the story.

In its final three days, the bank lost $500 million in deposits out of its total of $1.5 billion due to a run on the bank. At the end of the third day, the New York State Banking Department closed the bank, naming the FDIC as receiver. That same day Metropolitan Savings Bank of Brooklyn was named the new owner of the bank accounts. Three years later, the combined bank was renamed Crossland Federal Savings Bank, which failed in 1992 and was seized by the FDIC. Shares in Crossland were offered to the public in 1993; Crossland was acquired by Republic New York in 1995, which in turn was bought out by HSBC Bank USA in 1999. Today all of the former Crossland branches are owned by Citizens Financial Group.

== Headquarters building ==
In 1922-24, the bank constructed its new headquarters at the intersection of Broadway and West 36th Street in Midtown Manhattan. The steel-reinforced limestone and sandstone building was designed by noted bank architects York and Sawyer in a Classical Revival style with monumental Corinthian columns on three sides of the building, rusticated walls and a Roman-style dome. The interior was embellished with ten-foot-tall brass foyer doors, a board room and executive office with rubbed-oak paneling and soapstone fireplaces, and an elliptical banking room with limestone Corinthian columns, granite walls, a marble floor, a bronze tellers' screen with sculptures of Minerva (symbolizing wisdom) and Mercury (representing commerce), and a coffered, domed ceiling with a 3,000-square-foot (280 m^{2}) stained-glass skylight.

Haier America purchased the building in 2000 to be its American corporate headquarters. In 2002, Haier rechristened it The Haier Building. An event management company leases several of the Haier Building's large historic rooms, which are operated as the venue Gotham Hall for corporate events, private parties such as weddings and receptions, and other functions. Both the exterior and the first floor interior of the building were designated New York City landmarks in 1992, and the building was added to the National Register of Historic Places in 2005.

== In popular culture ==
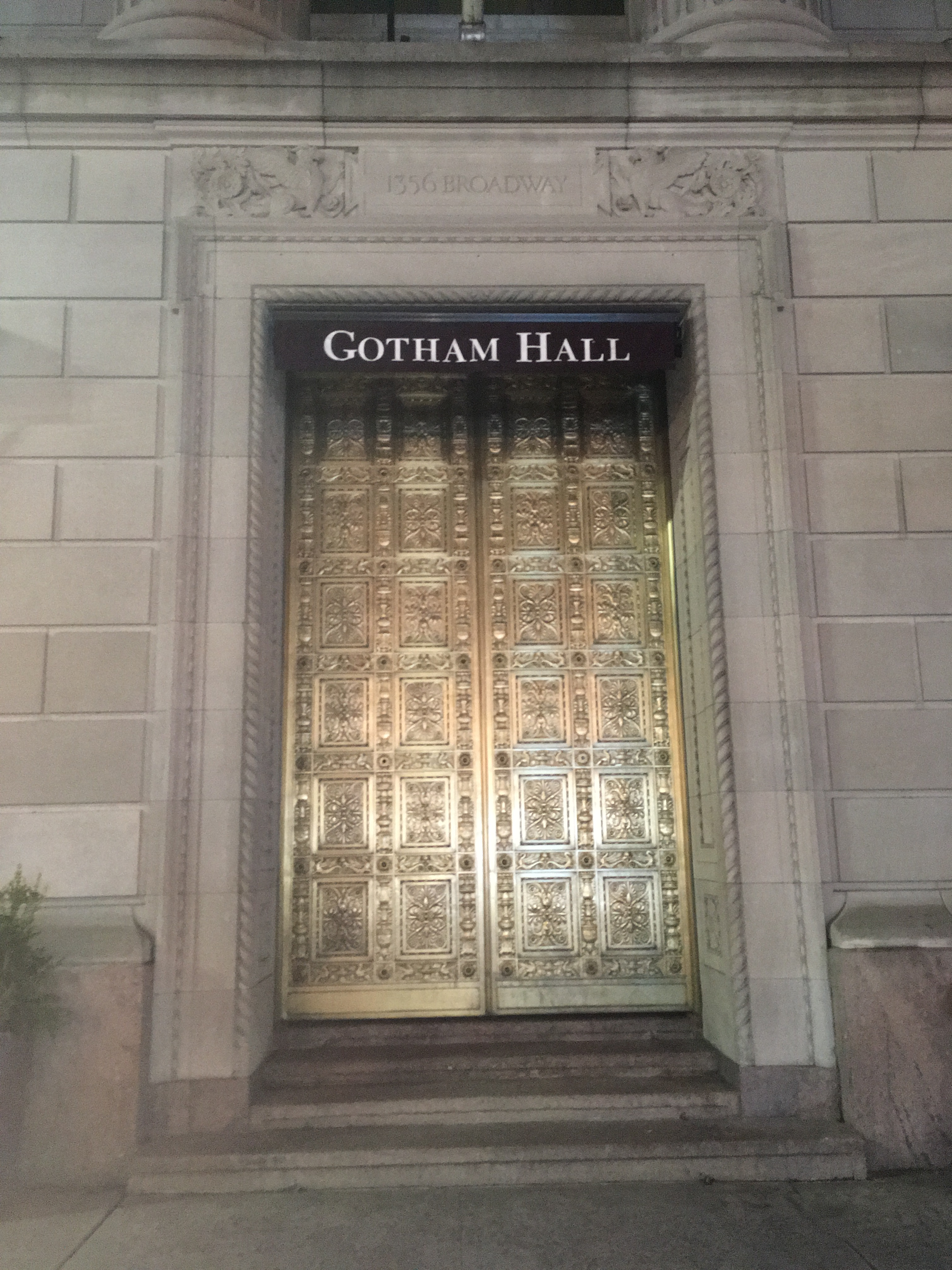
Gotham Hall

Based on the commercials run on local TV at the end of the 1970s and into the 1980s, the bank was referred to as "The Greenwich Savings Bank", with the pronunciation as "GREENwich", rather than the more commonly pronounced Greenwich Street, which is referred to as 'grenich'.

The film Going in Style starring George Burns and Art Carney also used this location in the scene where they robbed a bank.

In Season 21 of The Amazing Race, Gotham Hall was the first and so far only indoor Finish Line.
