= Dollar Savings Bank =

Bank in New York City (1890–2004)

- Dollar Savings Bank Headquarters
- U.S. National Register of Historic Places
- New York City Landmark
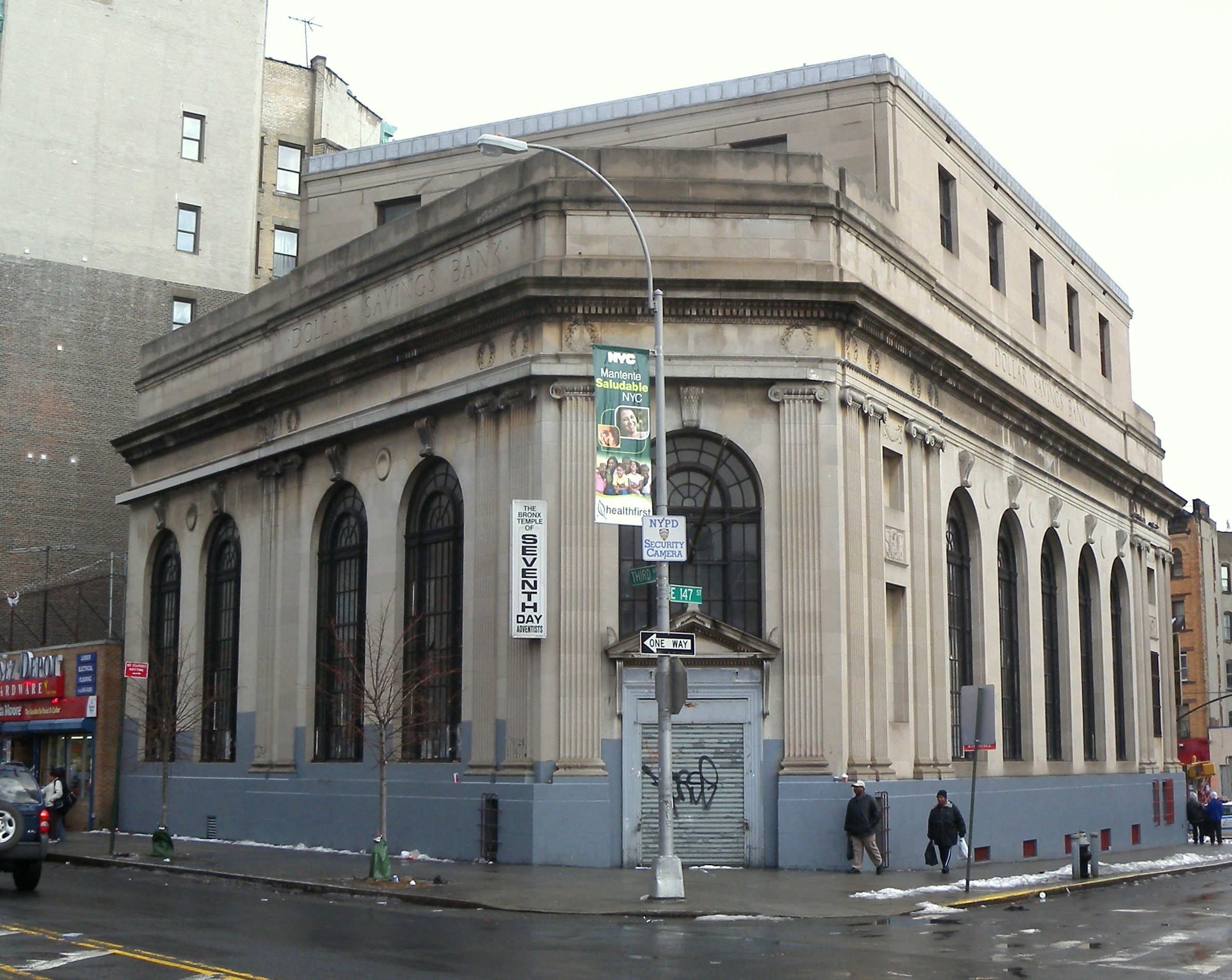
- Intersection of 3rd Ave and E 147th St

- Location within New York City Location within New York Location within the United States
- Location: 2792 Third Avenue, Bronx, New York, U.S.
- Coordinates: 40°48′54″N 73°55′8″W
- Architect: Renwick, Aspinwall & Tucker
- Architectural style: Classical Revival
- NRHP reference No.: 11000228
- NYCL No.: 2370

Significant dates
- Added to NRHP: April 27, 2011
- Designated NYCL: January 12, 2010

Dollar Savings Bank of New York was a bank that operated in New York City between 1890 and 2004.

== History ==
Dollar Savings Bank of New York was formed on June 23, 1890, or possibly 1887, founded by John Haffen.

In February 1983, after it was on the verge of bank failure, the Federal Deposit Insurance Corporation and the New York State Banking Department arranged for a merger of the bank with Dry Dock Savings Bank to form Dollar Dry Dock Savings Bank.

On February 21, 1992, the bank and its 21 branches were seized by the New York State Banking Department with the Federal Deposit Insurance Corporation named as receiver. Emigrant Savings Bank bought 20 of the branches and the Flushing branch was purchased by Apple Bank.

In 2011, the headquarters building in the Bronx was listed on the National Register of Historic Places. In 2024, the Dollar Savings Bank Building on Grand Concourse was listed on the NRHP.
