= Vitrine (historic furniture) =

Cabinet for object display

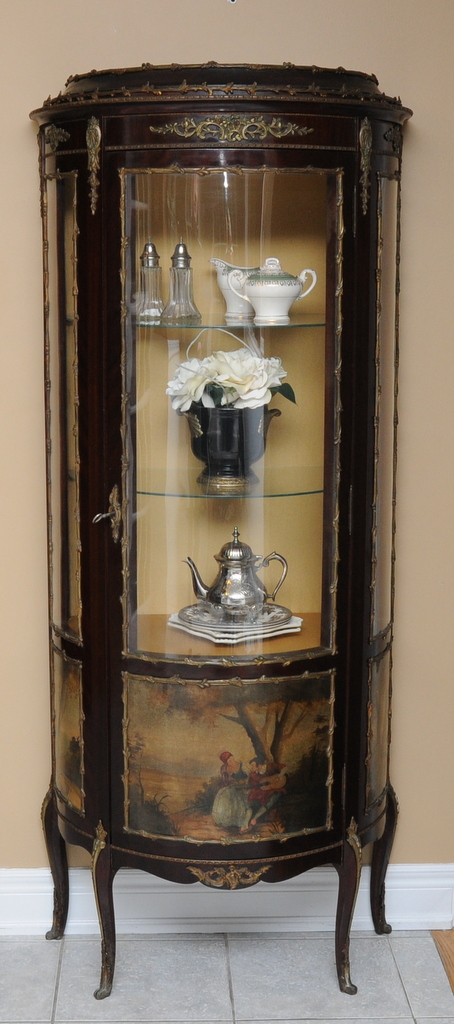
Neoclassical vitrine with vernis martin panels and sabot legs

Vitrines were a form of case furniture common from the 17th through the 19th centuries, which featured glass doors and windows used to display objects. They were named for the vitreous glass material from which they were constructed. In French, vitrine can also refer to a contemporary display case with clear sides, or to an event or exhibition referred to as a showcase, while in English, it generally only refers to antique furniture.

== History ==
=== Early history ===
Early vitrines were often constructed of darker woods, such as mahogany, rosewood, or walnut. Vitrines from southern Europe often featured extensive use of gilt bronze or ormolu mounts for ornamentation around the cartouches, edges, handles, key escutcheons, window panes, and other decorative elements, while vitrines from northern Europe often used less gilding and put more emphasis on the woodwork.

Due to French guild regulations, French vitrines would have been constructed by an ébéniste, or cabinetmaker, while gilders, glass-blowers, metalworkers, painters, and other craftsmen would have added the decorative elements through separate contracts with the patron or factory sales manager.

=== 18th–19th century ===
During the eighteenth century, kingwood was imported from South America to European ports, and cabinetmakers began using kingwood in the construction of vitrines and other Rococo case furniture due to its relative strength, lightweight, and flexibility. The light tan-colored rosewood was often covered with a wood veneer coating of kingwood or other thin, dark wooden panels which could be arranged into a marquetry pattern or inlaid into designs.

The use of lighter, more flexible woods allowed the furniture of the Renaissance and Baroque periods to gradually give way to more curvilinear designs. One of these designs was the bombe vitrine, which generally bulged out in a section between curved sabot legs and a straighter upper body which featured the panes of glass. This bulging section was sometimes decorated with extra marquetry woodwork or a painting on Vernis Martin lacquer, tortoiseshell, or inlaid ceramic plaques.

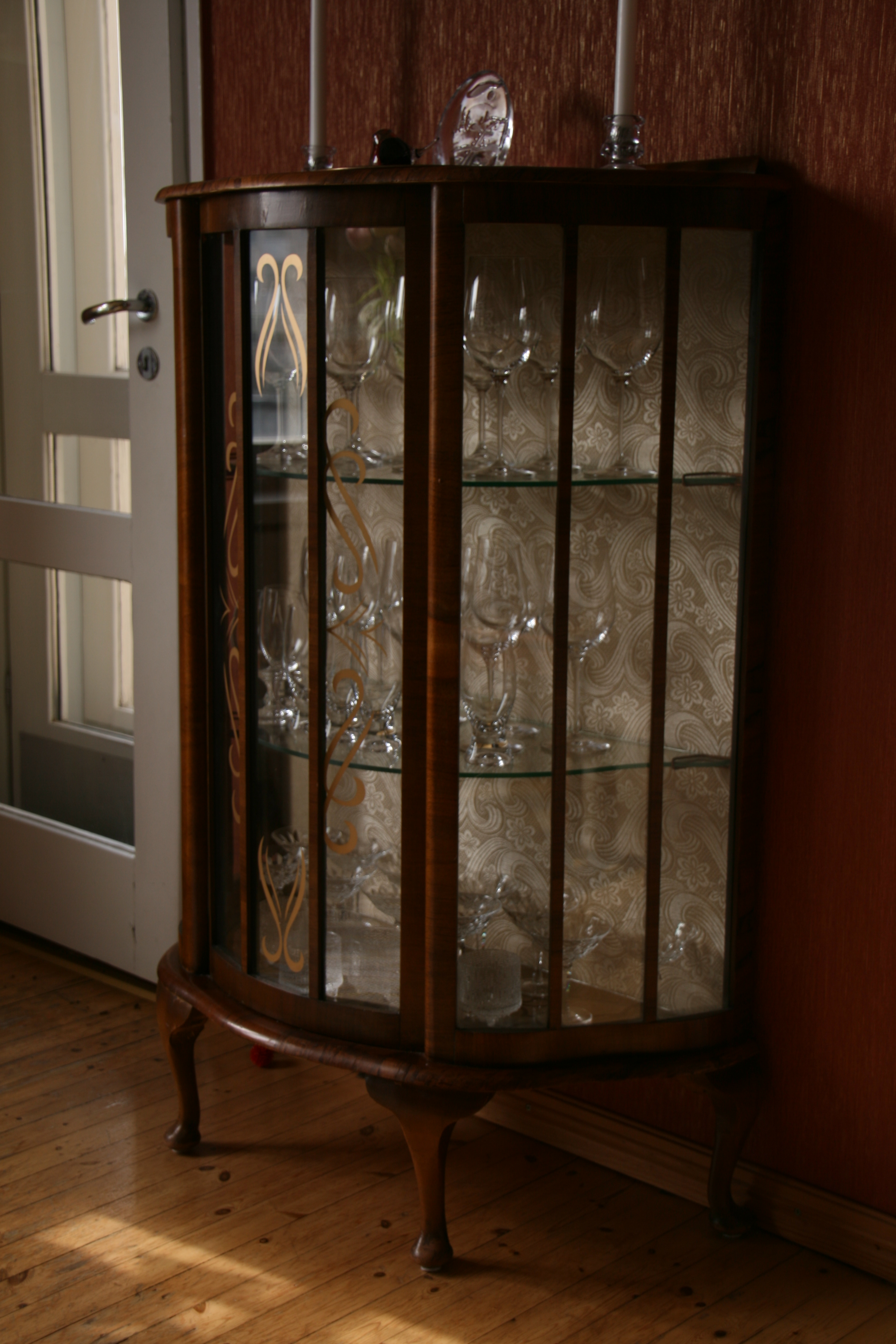
Nineteenth- or early twentieth-century style vitrine

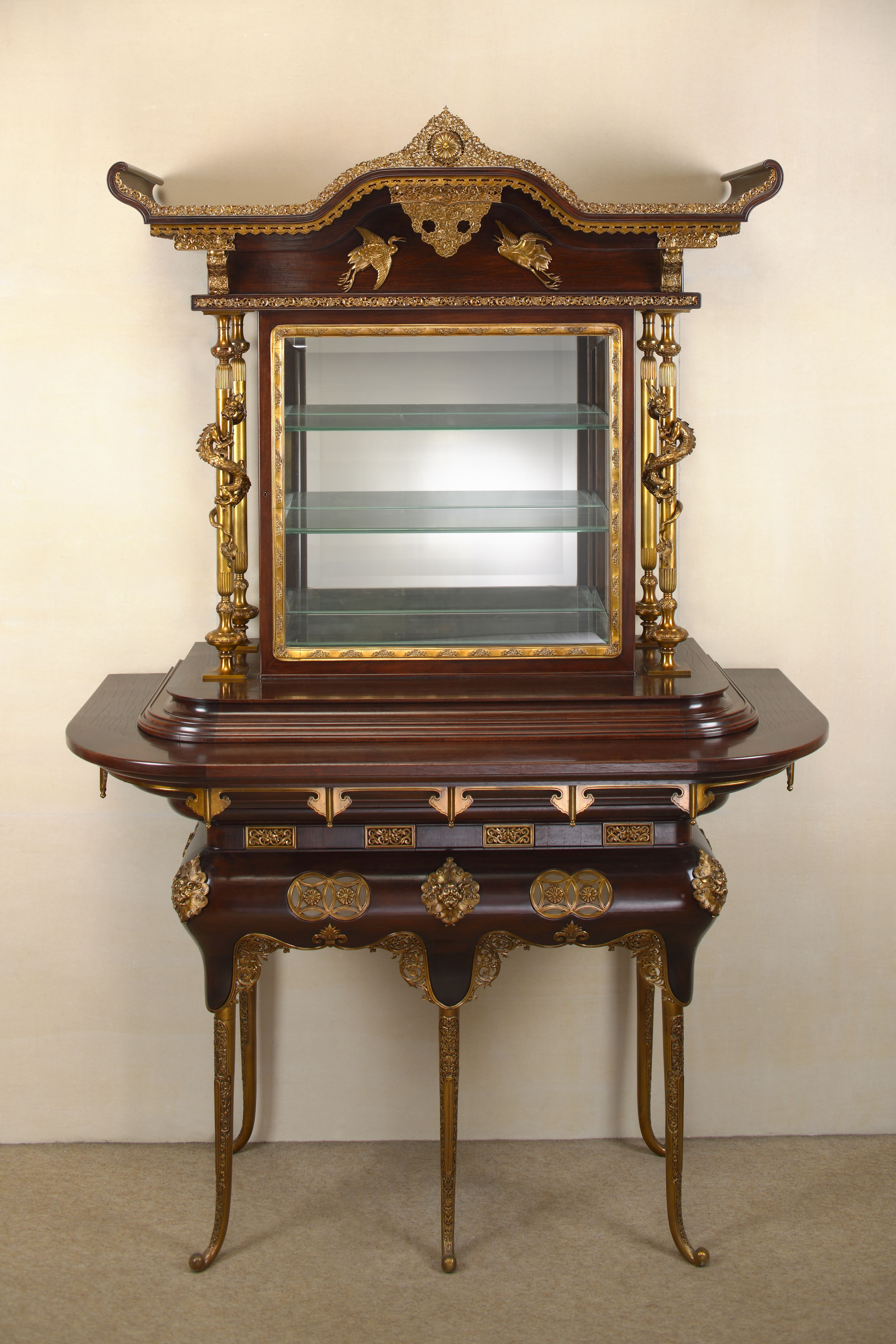
Japanese style vitrine

Nineteenth-century furniture makers often interpreted designs of earlier vitrines into more standardized or factory-produced furniture, which can often have smooth, factory-produced backs. François Linke was one of the most common producers of nineteenth-century French vitrines.

== Contemporary vitrines ==
In French, a variety of display cases, such as a store sales table or the Perspex glass protecting a piece of ceramics in a museum display, can be referred to as a vitrine. Additionally, a large event which is designed to exhibit or showcase merchandise, a topic or theme, can also be referred to as a vitrine, such as a "vitrine d'excellence". In English, vitrines generally only refer to decorative antique furniture from the first quarter of the twentieth century and earlier, with newer versions referred to as display cases or merchandise stands.
