= Dollar Dry Dock Savings Bank =

Savings bank in New York City

- Industry: Banking
- Founded: 1983; 43 years ago
- Defunct: 1992; 34 years ago
- Fate: Bank failure; acquired by Emigrant Savings Bank
- Headquarters: New York City, U.S.
- Total assets: $3.7 billion (1992)

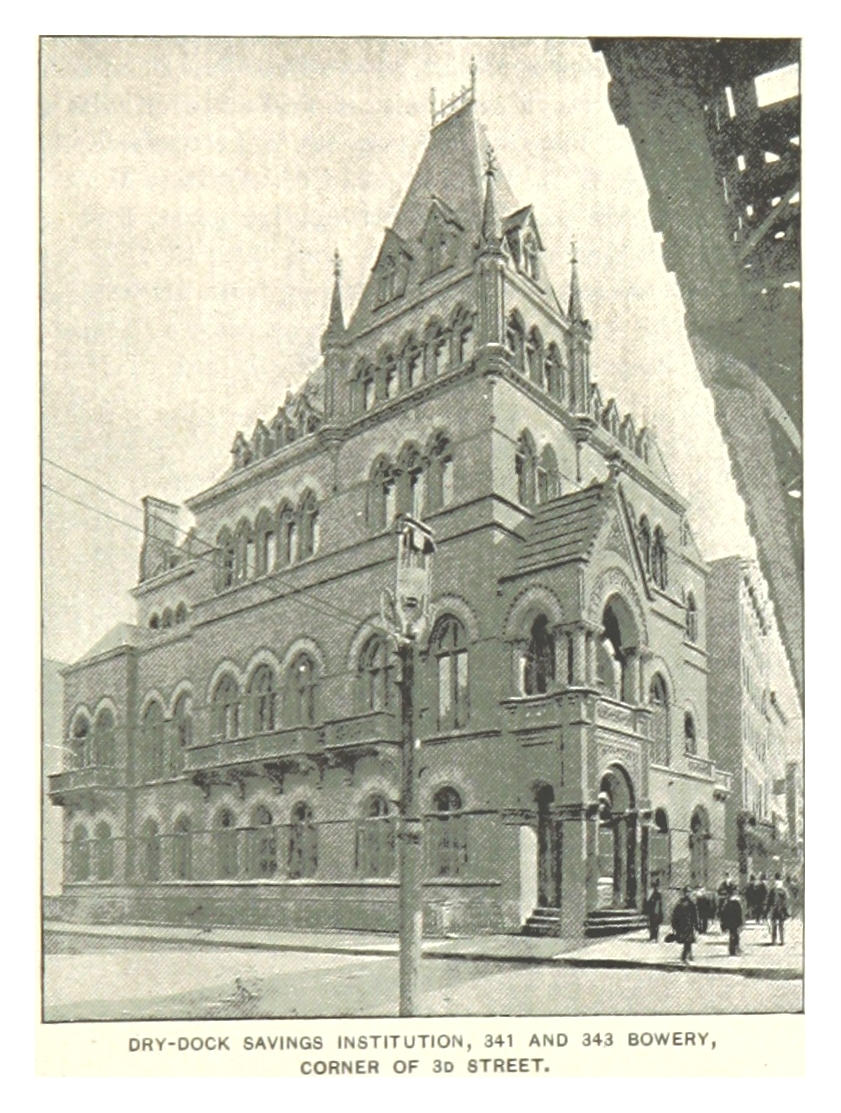
Dry-Dock Savings Institution, Bowery, Corner of 3d Street

Dollar Dry Dock Savings Bank was a savings bank that operated in New York City from 1983 until it suffered from bank failure in 1992.

== History ==
The bank was formed in 1983 by the merger of Dollar Savings Bank of New York and Dry Dock Savings Bank, which both dated back to the 1800s. Dry Dock Savings Bank celebrated its 125th Anniversary in 1973.

At the time of the merger, Dollar Savings Bank had 13 branches and Dry Dock had 30 branches. In order to raise cash, 6 branches were sold to Manufacturers Hanover Trust.

In 1985, the bank offered depositors an interest rate of 9.59% on money market accounts, one of the highest rates in the New York metropolitan area.

In 1986, the bank became privately held.

In 1989, a branch was sold to First Fidelity. In 1990, 2 branches were sold to Chase Manhattan Bank.

On February 21, 1992, the bank and its 21 branches were seized by the New York State Banking Department with the Federal Deposit Insurance Corporation named as receiver. Emigrant Savings Bank bought 20 of the branches and the Flushing branch was purchased by Apple Bank. At that time, the bank had $3.7 billion in assets. The real estate division was sold to the president of the company.
