= Brooklyn Trust Company Building =

Mixed-use building in Brooklyn, New York

- U.S. National Register of Historic Places
- New York State Register of Historic Places
- New York City Landmark
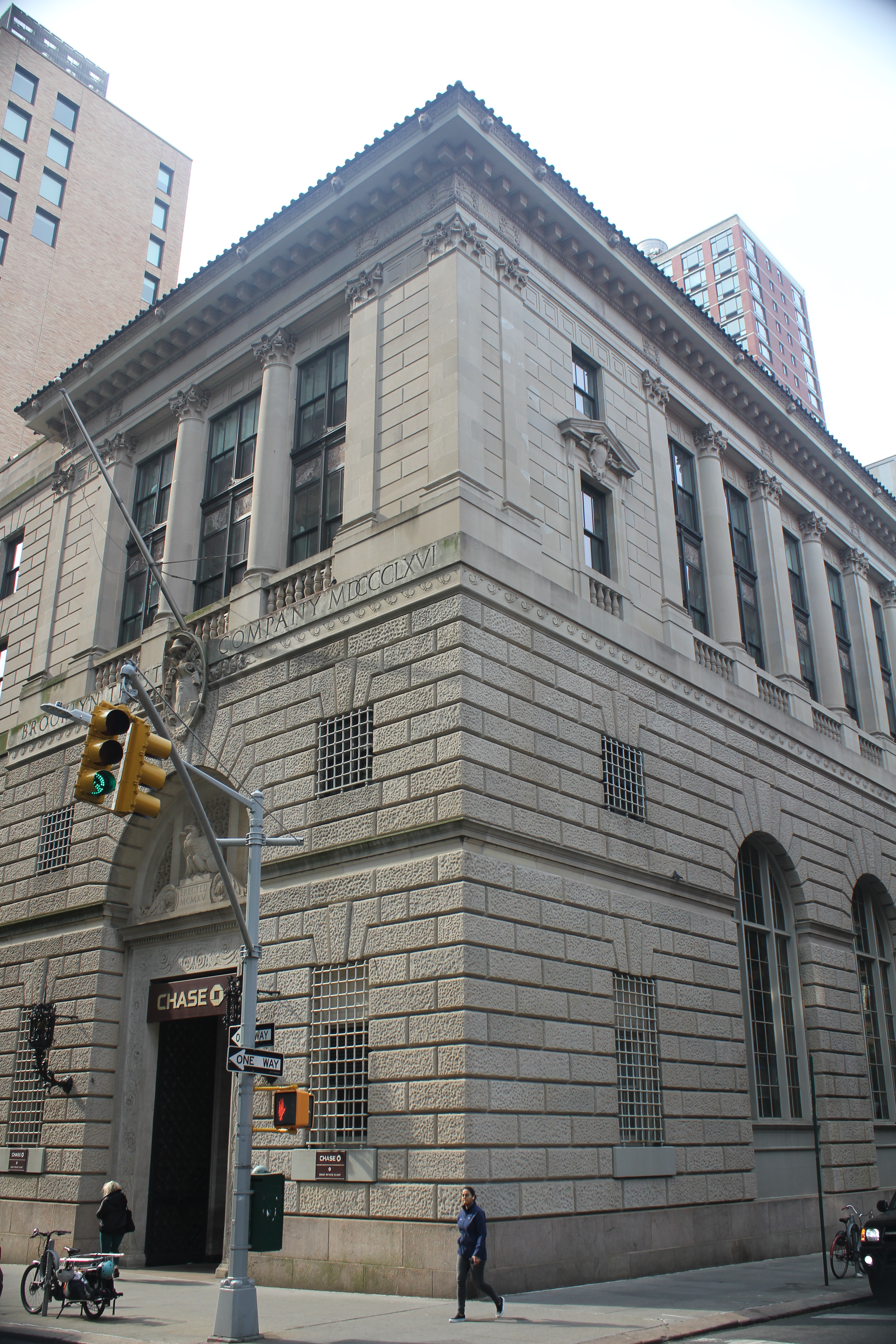
- Location: 177 Montague Street; Brooklyn, New York
- Coordinates: 40°41′40″N 73°59′32″W
- Area: 13,149 ft^{2} (1,221.6 m^{2})
- Built: 1916
- Architect: York & Sawyer
- Architectural style: Italian Renaissance
- NRHP reference No.: 09000632
- NYSRHP No.: 04701.013966
- NYCL No.: 1905, 1906

Significant dates
- Added to NRHP: August 20, 2009
- Designated NYSRHP: June 30, 2009
- Designated NYCL: June 25, 1996

The Brooklyn Trust Company Building is a bank and residential building at 177 Montague Street in the Brooklyn Heights neighborhood of Brooklyn in New York City, New York, U.S. Constructed for the Brooklyn Trust Company from 1913 to 1916, it occupies a site between Montague Street to the south, Clinton Street to the west, and Pierrepont Street to the north. The Brooklyn Trust Company Building was designed by York and Sawyer in the Renaissance Revival style and is patterned after the Palazzo della Gran Guardia in the Italian city of Verona. The building's facade and interior are New York City designated landmarks, and the building is listed on the National Register of Historic Places.

The building is divided into two parts: the main section to the west and an annex on Pierrepont Street to the east. The three-story base of the main building, as well as the annex, are clad with rusticated stone blocks. There are double-height arches facing all three streets; the arches on Montague and Pierrepont Streets contain ornate entrances. The fourth and fifth stories are treated like a loggia, with windows separated by pilasters, while the roof is made of Spanish tile. Inside, entrances on Montague and Pierrepont Street lead to ornamental vestibules. The rectangular banking room next to Clinton Street has Cosmati marble floors, yellow-beige marble walls, and a colorful vaulted ceiling. The building originally had additional offices on the ground, fourth, and fifth stories, as well as two bank vaults in the basement. Although the banking hall still serves as a Chase Bank branch, the upper stories contain 12 condominium apartments.

The Brooklyn Trust Company had occupied the corner of Montague and Clinton Streets since 1873 and had grown significantly over the next half-century. The bank acquired the Brooklyn Club's adjacent clubhouse in 1913 and constructed a new headquarters in two phases, which were completed by September 1916. The upper floors were originally rented out as offices, while the bank occupied the ground floor. Through several mergers, the Brooklyn Trust Company became part of JPMorgan Chase, which sold the building in 2007. The structure has been owned since 2009 by the Stahl Organization, which converted the upper floors to condos between 2012 and 2015.

== Site ==
The Brooklyn Trust Company Building is located in the Brooklyn Heights neighborhood of Brooklyn in New York City. It occupies a narrow land lot on the east side of Clinton Street, between Montague Street to the south and Pierrepont Street to the north. The site covers an area of 13,150 square feet (1,222 m^{2}). It has frontage of 200 feet (61 m) on Clinton Street, 75 ft (23 m) on Pierrepont Street, and 50 ft (15 m) on Montague Street; the easternmost part of the Pierrepont Street frontage extends only 100 ft (30 m) into the block. It adjoins the People's Trust Building and 185 Montague Street to the east, although the bank buildings have different architectural styles. Other nearby buildings include the Montague–Court Building at the eastern end of the block; the Brooklyn Union Gas Company Headquarters one block southeast; the Center for Brooklyn History building and the St. Ann & the Holy Trinity Church, just across Clinton Street to the west; and the Crescent Athletic Club House of Saint Ann's School, to the northwest across Clinton and Pierrepont Streets. An entrance to the New York City Subway's Borough Hall/Court Street station is across the street from the building's Montague Street entrance.

The Brooklyn Trust Company Building site was historically owned by Hezekiah Pierrepont, one of Brooklyn Heights' developers; Pierrepont Street was named for him, while Montague Street was named for his relative Lady Mary Wortley Montagu. Just prior to the construction of the current building, the corner of Clinton and Montague Streets was occupied by a house, which had been built in the 1850s as the residence of politician George Taylor and became the bank's headquarters in 1873. During the 1860s and early 1870s, the Brooklyn Academy of Music, Brooklyn Mercantile Library, and Brooklyn Art Association all had developed buildings on the adjoining block of Montague Street, which ran between Clinton and Court Streets. The Brooklyn Club occupied the site directly to the north of Taylor's house, on Pierrepont Street; the Greenleaf Female Institute had occupied this site in the mid-19th century. An increasing number of businesses were moving to the area by the 1890s, and the adjacent block of Montague Street was nicknamed "Bank Row" after several bank buildings were built there in the 1900s.

== Architecture ==
The Brooklyn Trust Company Building was designed by bank architects York and Sawyer for the Brooklyn Trust Company. The building's design was inspired by that of the Palazzo della Gran Guardia in the northern Italian city of Verona. When the building was erected in the 1910s, freestanding bank buildings in New York City were becoming prevalent, and many similar structures were being constructed with classical design details. After designing the Brooklyn Trust Company Building, York and Sawyer used a similar architectural style for the Federal Reserve Bank of New York Building and the Apple Bank Building, both in Manhattan.

Despite only appearing as a four-story structure, the Brooklyn Trust Company Building is five stories tall (including its annex). Due to the height of each story, the building is equivalent to a seven-story building. The roof of the main structure is covered with green tiles. The Brooklyn Trust Company Building's facade and interior are both protected as New York City landmarks, and the structure was listed on the National Register of Historic Places in 2009.

=== Facade ===
The facade, designed in the Italian Renaissance style, is made of limestone and granite and is divided horizontally into two sections. The ground and third stories comprise the base, which is clad in blocks of rusticated and vermiculated limestone above a pink-granite water table. Although the ground-floor banking hall corresponds to the first and second stories of the annex, the New York City Department of Buildings considers the banking hall to be one story. The fourth and fifth stories are treated as a piano nobile and contain a colonnade of double-height engaged columns and pilasters in the Corinthian order, which in turn are made of smooth limestone. At the northeast corner of the building, there is a three-bay-wide annex with a rusticated limestone facade.

==== Montague Street ====
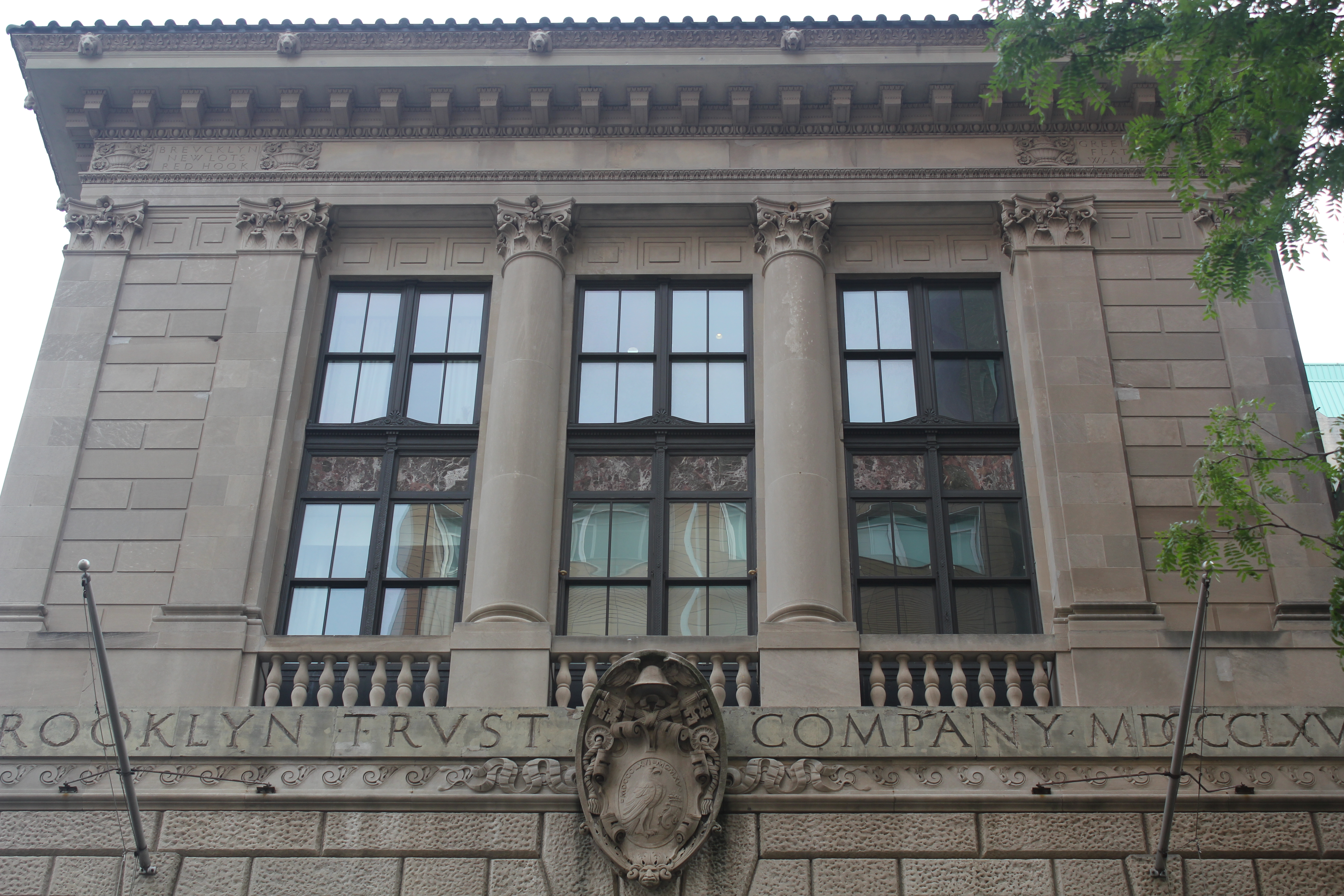
The loggia atop the Montague Street elevation

On the Montague Street elevation of the facade, the main decorative element is a round arch at the center, which is accessed by a stoop with five steps. The stoop is flanked by stone pedestals with cast-iron torchères measuring 15 ft (4.6 m) high. The base of each torchère contains a layer of lions, which supports a layer of tortoises. Above the tortoises are motifs such as volutes, acanthus leaves, flowers, and fruits. The shaft of each torchère is decorated with motifs of birds and leaves, supporting a globe-shaped lamp at the top. The entryway itself is recessed and consists of a set of double-height wrought-iron gates with foliate ornament, as well as a set of inner doors made of bronze and glass. When the bank is open, the wrought-iron gates retract into a rectangular Roman Imperial-style frame made of fine-grained limestone. This frame contains rinceaux with scrolled acanthuses, as well as motifs of flowers, birds, animals, and urns with centaur-like figures on either side.

On the facade, at ground level, there is one rectangular window with a metal grille on either side of the centrally positioned entryway, as well as voussoirs in the lintel above the window; the central voussoir is a slightly protruding keystone. Above these rectangular windows, there are square windows on the mezzanine with similar voussoirs, and a flagpole extends outward from the central voussoir. At the mezzanine level, there is a lunette atop the arch, divided into three sections by vertical bands, which contains a stone grille with floral and urn patterns. The middle of the lunette has a plaque with the words "Erected MCMXV", topped by an eagle with spread wings, while the outer sections of the lunette contain scrolled acanthus-leaf motifs which flank the plaque. Atop this lunette is a cartouche of a shield with a carved eagle and inscriptions of two years in Roman numerals: MDCCCLXVI (1866), when the Brooklyn Trust Company received its charter, and MCMXV (1915), when the building was finished. The shield is topped by a winged helmet, which in turn is flanked by a set of interlocking key designs.

The piano nobile consists of a colonnade of three bays on the fourth and fifth stories. Each bay contains a two-over-two sash window; dark-red marble spandrels between the fourth- and fifth-story windows; and balustrades in front of each fourth-story window. Corinthian engaged columns separate each of the bays, and there are pilasters flanking the entire colonnade, as well as on either end of the facade. There is a frieze above the fifth story, with urns separating square panels and reliefs on the frieze. The panels contain inscriptions with the names "Greenpoint–Flatbush–Wallabout" on the left (west) and "Breucklyn–New Lots–Red Hook" [sic] on the right (east), all in capital letters. These names represent towns and villages that were integrated into modern-day Brooklyn. (Note: Sources disagree on whether these places were mentioned because they were served by the bank or merely because they became part of Brooklyn.) Just below the roof is a cornice with denticulation and water spouts with lions' heads. The top story is under the tiled roof.

==== Clinton Street ====
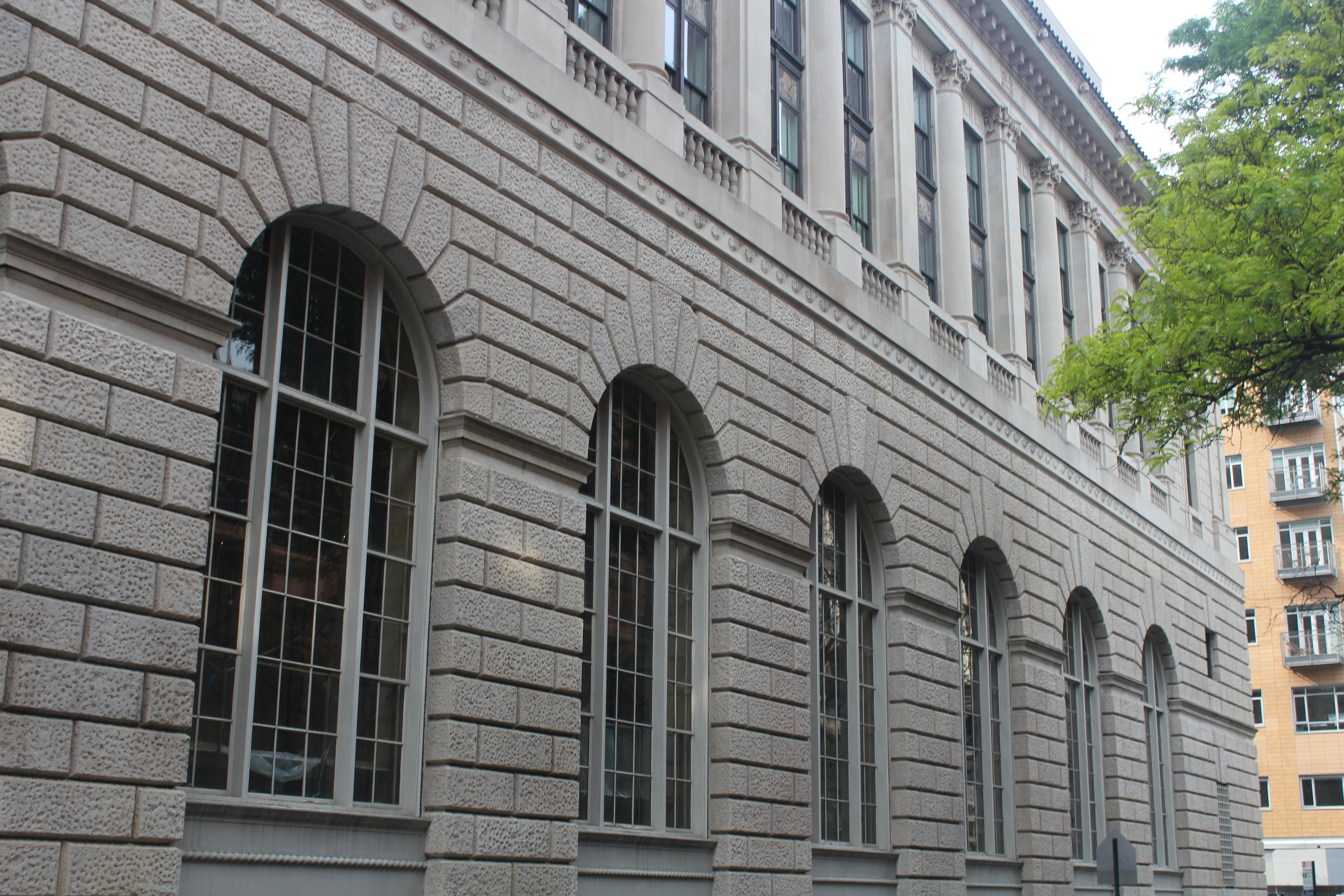
Facade on Clinton Street

The Clinton Street elevation is divided horizontally into two sections, similar to the Pierrepont and Montague Street elevations. The base is divided horizontally into nine bays. The two outermost bays contain rectangular windows at ground level and square windows on the third story; these windows have grilles and voussoirs, similar to the outer bays on the other elevations. The seven center bays contain double-height arches with recessed windows. Thick mullions divide the windows into six sections in a three-over-three configuration. Each of the windows has 61 panes in total. There are painted stone panels beneath the windows, as well as voussoirs above.

The fourth and fifth stories are divided vertically into fourteen bays. On these stories, the extreme north and south ends of the Clinton Street elevation have pilasters and antae. In the two outermost bays, the fourth-story window has a balustrade and is topped by a cartouche and a triangular pediment. The fifth-story windows of the outermost bays are simple rectangular windows. The twelve center bays form a colonnade on the fourth and fifth stories. Each bay contains a two-over-two sash window, with dark-red marble spandrels between the fourth- and fifth-story windows, as well as balustrades in front of each fourth-story window. Corinthian engaged columns separate each of the bays, and there are pilasters flanking the entire colonnade, as well as on either end of the facade. There is a frieze above the fifth story, with the words "Anno Domini MCMXV" inscribed in capital letters at either end of the facade; these words are flanked by urns. Just below the roof is a cornice with denticulation and water spouts with lions' heads.

==== Pierrepont Street ====
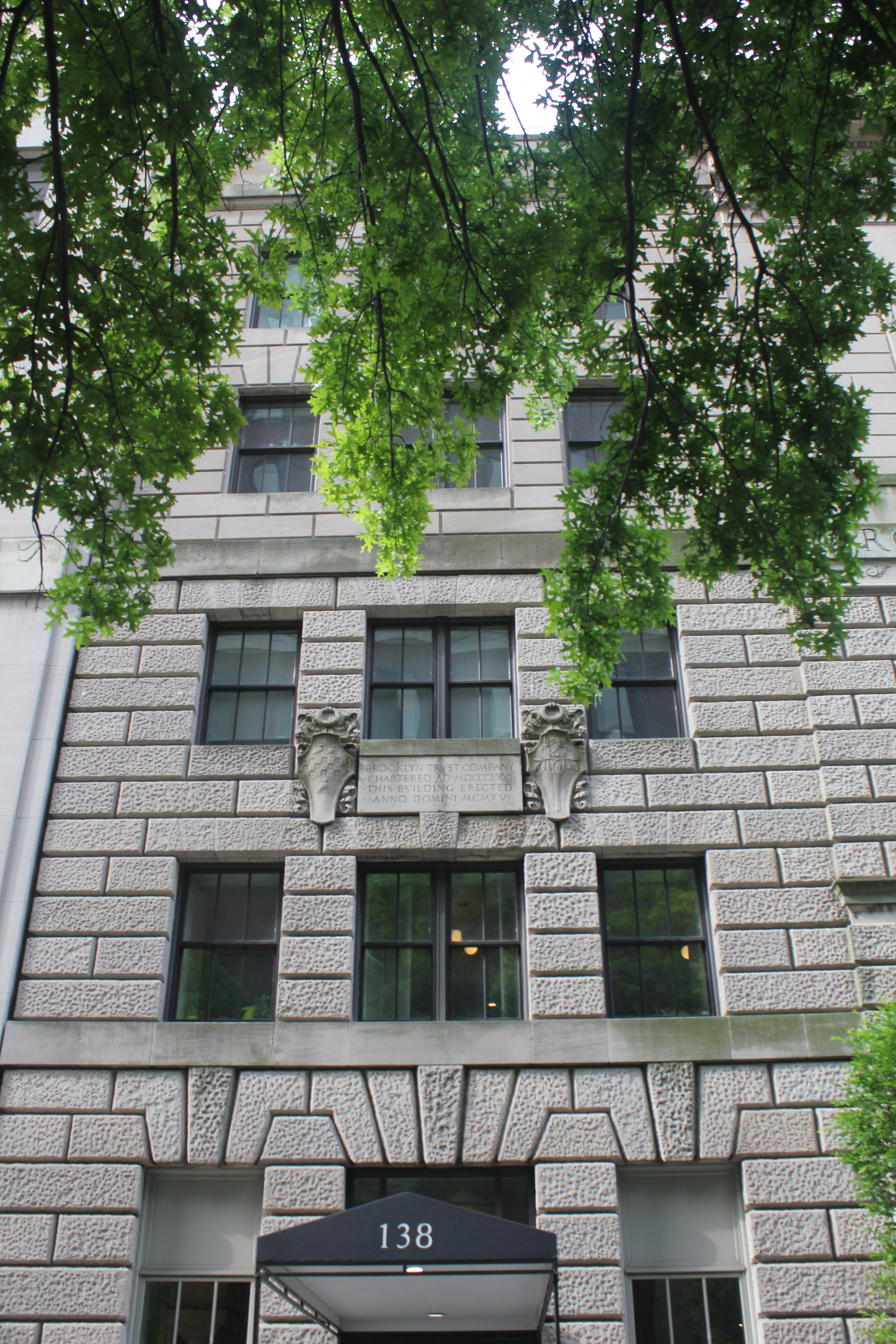
Facade of the annex on Pierrepont Street

The facade of the main building on Pierrepont Street is similar to that on Montague Street, but the entrance is exactly at ground level, and the limestone frame within the arch has acanthus leaves at its base. Instead of torchères, octagonal lanterns are attached directly to the facade, with flowers and leaves topped by a fleur-de-lis pattern. The frieze at the top contains the inscriptions "New Utrecht–Flatland–Breucklyn" [sic] on the left (east) and "Gravesend–Gowanus–Bushwick" on the right (east), all in capital letters.

The first through third stories of the annex are clad with rusticated and vermiculated blocks similar to the main building, while the fourth and fifth stories have a smooth ashlar facade. The first story originally had windows shielded by grilles, and there are voussoirs above the first-story openings. On the second through fourth stories, there is a double window in the center bay and a single window in either of the outer bays. In addition, the center bay has a panel with an inscription above the window on the third story. To the left of this panel is a Renaissance-style shield with a checkerboard pattern, while to the right is a Renaissance-style shield depicting an oak tree with exposed roots. The checkerboard was intended to symbolize the state of being constant; by comparison, the oak tree was supposed to signify "strength and antiquity", and its exposed roots may refer to the fact that the bank had "nothing to hide". All of the windows on the fifth story are single windows, but the central bay is wider than the outer bays. There are voussoirs above all the fourth- and fifth-story windows, as well as a plain cornice above the fifth story.

=== Interior ===
The building contains an internal steel superstructure, and the foundations were also made of steel. When the structure was built, most of the building was dedicated to the Brooklyn Trust Company's operations, including bank vaults in the basement and offices on the first three stories. The two top floors were rented out as offices. When the building opened, it had 46 miles (74 km) of wiring for various mechanical systems. The bank vaults alone used 1,000 short tons (890 long tons; 910 t) of masonry and 500 short tons (450 long tons; 450 t) of steel.

Following a renovation in the early 2010s, there have been a dozen condominiums on the upper stories, while the ground-story space continued to function as a bank. The condominium portion of the building has several amenity spaces, including a laundry room, a pet spa, a gymnasium, a lounge, playrooms for children and teenagers, and a room for music practice. There is also a rooftop terrace.

==== Banking hall ====
The interior of the banking hall is designed with elements of Ancient Roman architecture and Italian Renaissance architecture, including Cosmati marble floors and a vaulted ceiling. The room is divided into seven bays on the west and east walls, and is accessed by the lobbies to its north and south. The marble floor is split into seven pieces, each corresponding to a bay on the west and east walls, and is made of gray, light beige, and green, and porphyry marble and stone. The floor had curved and rectangular borders made of tesserae. In addition, the banking floor had three bronze writing tables for customers, each of which had eight legs shaped like animals' legs. The marble tellers' counters on the eastern wall originally had bronze tellers' cages, which were replaced by wood-and-Plexiglas enclosures in 1994.

The walls are clad with yellow-beige marble. Both the west and east walls are divided into seven bays. The western wall is illuminated by the seven arched windows on the Clinton Street elevation, while the eastern wall contains a round-arched window flanked by six blind arches. There is a cast frieze below each window, which contains medallions containing depictions of the heads of various classical figures; the medallions are separated by acanthuses, urns, and mythological creatures, and the frieze itself is interrupted by piers and doorways. The openings on both the west and east walls are separated by rusticated pilasters, which support a cornice with motifs of running dogs and acanthus leaves. On the western wall, the fourth bay from the south has a U-shaped staircase to the basement, which contains a marble handrail, marble walls, and stone floors with geometric borders. On the eastern wall, the fourth and fifth bays each have a doorway with a wooden door containing rosette carvings; a polished marble frame; and a curved pediment and central cartouche above the door. The sixth and seventh bays on the eastern wall have simpler doorways. All four of the east wall's doorways lead to offices.

The north and south walls are similar to each other. At each corner, the lower section of the wall has a marble revetment, above which are piers that support an architrave containing octagonal and trapezoidal shapes. A double-height doorway is at the center of both the north and south walls, surrounded by a molded frame with Roman-style decorations; the doorways themselves contain bronze-and-glass doors topped by transom windows. A Renaissance-style shield is placed atop the center of each door frame, above which is a panel with a carved phrase, which itself is flanked by various reliefs. (Note: The plaque above the southern doorway says "Commerce defies every wind, outrides every tempest and invades every zone", while that above the northern doorways says "Society is built upon trust and trust upon confidence in one another's integrity".)

The banking hall's vaulted ceiling is cited as measuring 40 ft (12 m) high. The ceiling is extremely ornate and contains octagonal coffers. (Note: One source incorrectly describes the coffers as hexagonal.) The plaster reliefs on the ceiling are painted blue, green, gold, and beige. The coffers alternate with lozenges and are arranged in a 52-by-12 grid. Above the arches on the west and east walls are lunettes with elaborate grilles. At the center of the ceiling are circular medallions with floral patterns and Greek-key borders in the second, fourth, and sixth bays from the south. Suspended from these medallions are multi-tiered, circular bronze chandeliers, with such decorations as caryatids, struts, and foliate brackets.

==== Other lower-story spaces ====
The banking hall is adjoined by entrance vestibules to the north and south, which are nearly identical in design, except for a letter box that is only present in the southern vestibule. Each vestibule has Cosmato marble floors, in addition to light-gray marble walls, which are chamfered at each corner. The western and eastern walls contain reliefs of shields with an eagle at the center, as well as garlands, fruit, and leaves on either side; there are four ventilation grilles below the western relief. The eastern wall additionally contains an alcove with elevator doors and a bronze-and-glass door to a staircase. The plaster ceiling of each vestibule contains multicolored reliefs and a hexagonal chandelier of bronze and glass hanging from a medallion at the center of the ceiling. The medallion is inset within a rectangular frame that contains Greek key motifs; there are depictions of monsters at each corner of the frame.

The doors on the eastern wall of the banking hall lead to the main office and its foyer, both of which have plaster ceilings and wood paneling on the walls. Cabinets are built into the walls of the foyer, and there are acanthus leaves and floral designs on the ceiling of the foyer. The main office has a fireplace mantel made of dark gray marble; a doorway leading back to the banking room; and pilasters that divide the wood paneling into several sections. There is a wooden cornice with denticulation at the top of the wall. The ceiling depicts vines and leaves and has a chandelier suspended from its center. There is a rectangular office at the northwestern corner of the ground story. The northwestern office has a wooden fireplace mantel with carvings of youths and pendants, which in turn is framed by brown-veined granite; there is a large recessed mirror and a fanlight above the fireplace. The other walls are arched at their tops and have plaster carvings of urns, leaves, and vines, which support a vaulted ceiling with similar plasterwork decoration. When the building opened, there was also a "retiring room" or lounge for female bank patrons, which was designed in the Adam style and had black walnut and old blue furniture. By the 2010s, a bank vault off the lobby had a pet-grooming station, and there was bicycle storage and stroller storage next to it.

The Brooklyn City Safe Deposit Company originally used the basement, which has an arched ceiling. The basement has a corridor with ornamental plasterwork; marble walls, similar to those in the banking hall; and marble floors, which have a light-gray marble border with inlaid gray marble. The northern side of the basement has two rooms for bank vaults, separated from the rest of the basement by a bronze screen with a central doorway and a clock. Each vault had walls measuring over 2 ft (0.61 m) thick, as well as doors that weighed 25 short tons (22 long tons; 23 t) apiece and could only be opened by first lowering the floor in front of the vault. According to contemporaneous sources, the vaults were capable of "resisting any known method of attack". The room containing the main bank vault is accessed by a set of six marble steps with bronze railings. The floor of the main bank vault room has a light-gray marble border surrounding a dark-gray marble panel, while the ceiling is vaulted. The main bank vault, on the room's northern wall, has a steel wall and door. The west and east walls contain doorways, with the eastern doorway leading to a smaller vault with a bronze vault screen.

==== Upper stories ====
The annex on Pierrepont Street originally had three stories of offices for the bookkeeping department, which was connected to the banking hall by a series of pneumatic tubes. Part of the fourth floor of the main structure had offices for Brooklyn Trust's board of directors. The rest of the top two stories were originally intended as offices, which were rented to outside firms. By the late 2000s, many of the upper-story spaces had been heavily modified, with elements such as dropped ceilings. The fourth-floor conference room was rectangular and had two bays of recessed windows on the walls, each consisting of five pairs of panes. The walls included sconces, and there was a fireplace on the south wall, with molded foliate ornaments and a marble frame. The ceiling was arched and contained geometrical and floral plasterwork motifs, as well as two chandeliers. On the fifth floor was a corridor that retained its original wood wainscoting, as well as doorways with wooden frames and transom bars on both sides. In addition, some of the fifth-story offices had black marble mantels.

Following the 2010s renovation, the condos on the upper stories have had up to five bedrooms; the majority of the condos have at least three bedrooms. The condos are accessed via a separate lobby on Pierrepont Street, which is clad in marble. Some of the residences retain the building's original fireplaces/ Because the building was protected as a landmark, the developers were not allowed to modify certain parts of the building, so the residential stories are suspended from trusses on the top story, and many of the apartments have unconventional features. Three duplex apartments have ladders connecting the main floor with the upper story. In another apartment, the master bedroom has a concealed panel that leads to the controls of one of the clocks in the banking hall; the manager of the bank had to enter that apartment twice a year to reset the clocks. Because of the preservation regulations, the top story has movable skylights but no windows.

== History ==
The Brooklyn Trust Company was chartered in 1866 and moved to George Taylor's old house at the corner of Clinton and Montague Streets in 1873. To meet the bank's growing needs, the house was expanded several times. After the Brooklyn Trust Company acquired the Long Island Loan and Trust Company in early 1913, bank officials sought to expand their quarters further. At the time, the existing headquarters of the bank measured 100 by 50 ft (30 by 15 m).

=== Development ===
The Brooklyn Club agreed in November 1913 to sell its clubhouse at Clinton and Pierrepont Streets, adjacent to the Taylor house, to the Brooklyn Trust Company for $115,000, following several months of secret negotiations. The site of the clubhouse measured 100 by 75 ft (30 by 23 m), more than doubling the bank's holdings in the area. Under the terms of the sale, the bank was required to start construction on the clubhouse's site within two years, and the club was to occupy two stories in the new building. The club's members ratified the sale in December, and the company made plans to replace both the Brooklyn Club building and the Taylor house. The structure was projected to cost about $500,000, $600,000, or $750,000. The new headquarters would be six times as large as the old one. York and Sawyer was hired to design the new building, and Marc Eidlitz & Son was hired as the contractor. In addition, James McLaren & Sons of Brooklyn was hired to create the building's stonework, while William H. Jackson, also of Brooklyn, manufactured the wrought-iron gates and bronze tellers' grilles.

Work on the building was underway by July 1914. The project employed workers from 104 trades. The first half was begun at the corner of Clinton and Pierrepont Streets, replacing the Brooklyn Club building, and was finished in mid-1915. The bank moved its operations to the Pierrepont Street half of the building on September 7, 1915. Officers' offices were arranged near the southern end of the Pierrepont Street portion of the banking hall; as such, when the entire building was done, they would occupy the center of the banking hall. Work commenced on the Montague Street section later the same year. Despite a labor strike during construction, the Montague Street half opened on September 13, 1916. The completion of the building coincided with the bank's 50th anniversary.

=== Usage ===
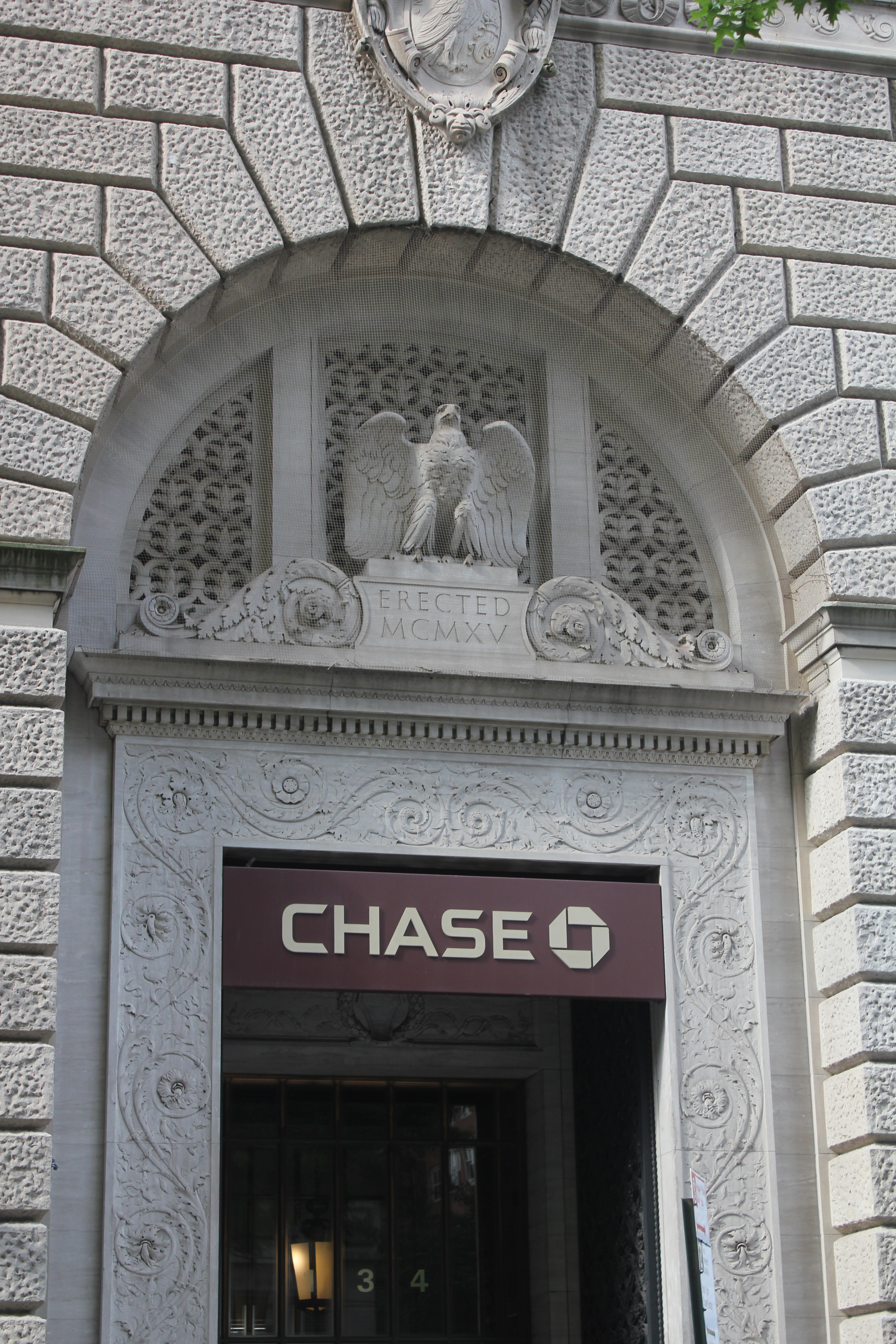
Detail of the entrance

Among the building's office tenants was law firm Cullen and Dykman LLP, which moved into the Brooklyn Trust Company Building in 1915. The law firm remained on the building's upper stories for most of the 20th century, even as it opened new locations across Long Island. The Brooklyn Trust Company continued to expand during the early 20th century, opening additional branches throughout New York City. By the 1930s, the Brooklyn Trust Company had 31 branches in New York City, including in Queens and Staten Island. One of the bank's branches, within Park Slope, was modeled after the design of its main headquarters on Montague Street. The Brooklyn Trust Company Building became a branch of the Manufacturers Trust Company when Brooklyn Trust merged into Manufacturers Trust in October 1950.

During the 1960s, Manufacturers Trust became part of the Manufacturers Hanover Corporation, which in 1966 relocated the Montague Street branch's counting operations to St. John's Terminal in Manhattan. As part of "Brighten Downtown Brooklyn", an initiative supported by the Downtown Brooklyn Development Association, Manufacturers Hanover began illuminating the building's bronze torches at night in the late 1980s. In addition, Cullen & Dykman renewed its lease of the upper stories for twenty years in 1987. The LPC hosted public hearings in June 1993 to determine whether to designate the Brooklyn Trust Company Building and its interior as a city landmark, along with that of three other banks in Brooklyn and two in Manhattan. (Note: The others were the Dime Savings Bank Building, Williamsburgh Savings Bank Building (175 Broadway), Williamsburgh Savings Bank Building (1 Hanson Place), Bowery Savings Bank Building (130 Bowery), and Bowery Savings Bank Building (110 East 42nd Street).) The bank building and its interior was designated as a New York City landmark on June 25, 1996.

Through various mergers, the bank building became a branch of JPMorgan Chase by the beginning of the 21st century. After a 19th-century building in Brooklyn Heights was demolished in 2004, local civic groups began advocating for the Brooklyn Trust Company Building at 177 Montague Street to be further protected as part of the proposed Brooklyn Heights Skyscraper Historic District. In 2007, JPMorgan Chase sold the building to Brookfield Asset Management, though JPMorgan Chase continued to operate a Chase Bank branch on the ground floor. In turn, Brookfield Asset Management sold the building to the Stahl Organization, operated by the family of Stanley Stahl, in 2008 for $9.7 million. The building was added to the National Register of Historic Places on August 20, 2009.

The Stahl Organization announced in December 2012 that it would convert the annex of the Brooklyn Trust Company Building to 13 condominiums. Stahl had previously converted the upper stories of another landmarked bank, the Apple Bank Building in Manhattan, to condos. The plans included the construction of a new residential lobby designed by Barry Rice Architects, as well as restoration of the windows and the facade; the banking hall would not be modified because it was a city landmark. Later that month, the LPC approved a modified version of the condominium conversion, which included a one-story addition to the annex. The New York City Department of Buildings approved plans for the condo conversion in February 2013, and the developers released floor plans for the condos that August. The renovation was completed in 2015, and sales of the 12 condos began that May. Four of the twelve condos had been sold by the end of the year. The cheapest units cost $3.35 million; the high prices were attributed to what one real-estate agent called "great architectural plans given the limitations of the existing building".

== Reception ==
When the Brooklyn Trust Company Building was being built, Brooklyn Life wrote that "this structure will be a decided addition to Brooklyn's group of handsome buildings", while the Brooklyn Daily Eagle wrote that the bank building was to be one of the "showplaces of Brooklyn". The Standard Union wrote: "With the lofty Mechanics Bank Building at the other end of the block, they will be twin pillars of Brooklyn's financial system."

A half-century after the building's construction, architecture critic Henry Hope Reed Jr. wrote that the bank "is one of the finest of the sort". According to Reed, "even that lovely northern Italian city [Verona] would not scorn this hall, with its Cosmatesque floor (marble work which resembles mosaic, as done by the Cosmati family of mediaeval Rome) and its high, polychromed ceiling". In the 2008 edition of the Guide to New York City Landmarks, Matthew A. Postal and Andrew Dolkart wrote: "The Brooklyn Trust Company, established in 1866, was responsible for the construction of the most beautiful building on Brooklyn's bank row."

== See also ==
- List of New York City Designated Landmarks in Brooklyn
- National Register of Historic Places listings in Brooklyn
- Greenwich Savings Bank Building, also designed by York and Sawyer
