= Apple Bank Building =

Bank and apartment building in Manhattan, New York

- Central Savings Bank
- U.S. National Register of Historic Places
- New York State Register of Historic Places
- New York City Landmark
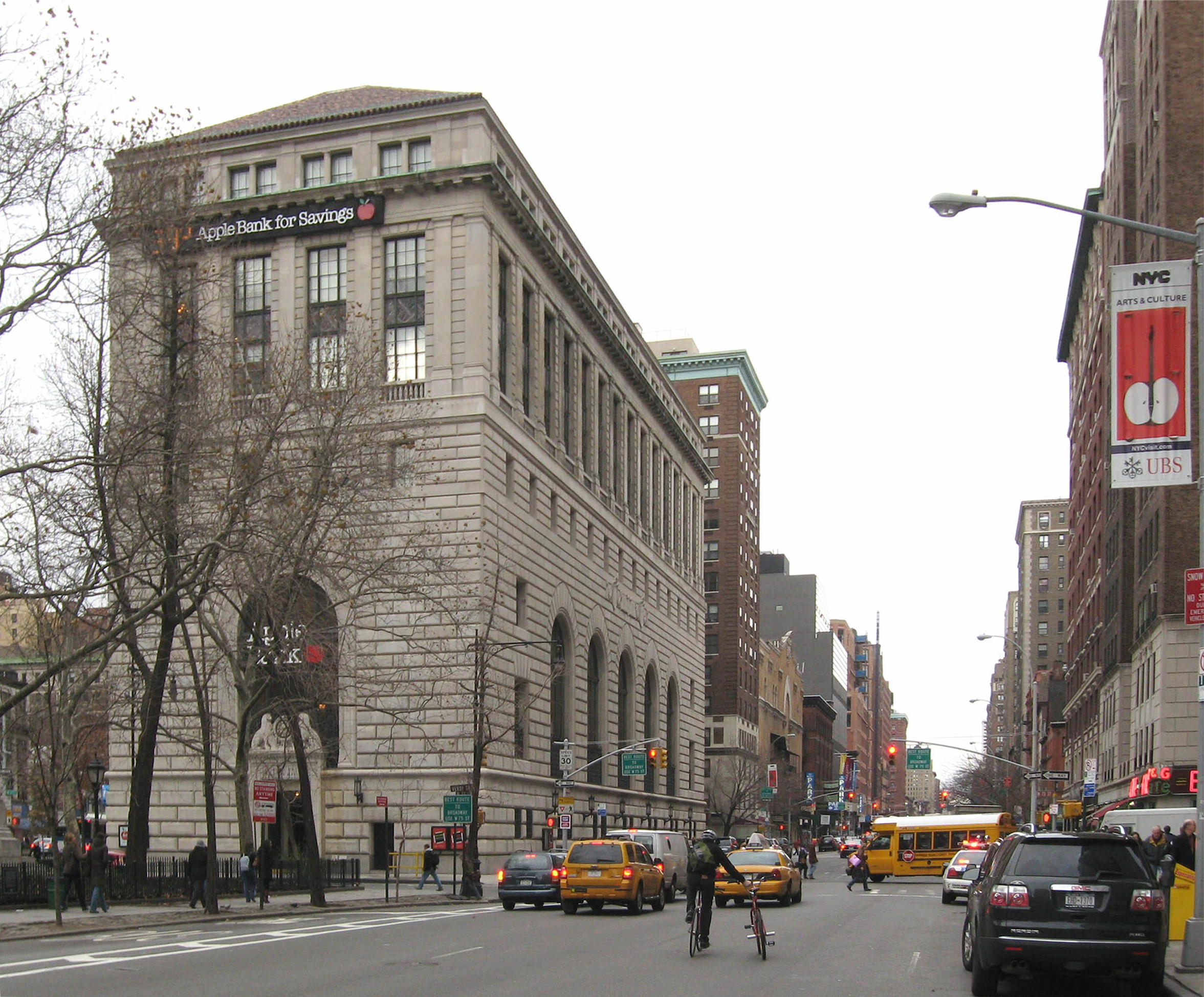
- The southern facade of the bank as seen from Amsterdam Avenue and 72nd Street
- Location: 2100–2108 Broadway, Manhattan, New York, US
- Coordinates: 40°46′47″N 73°58′53″W
- Built: December 8, 1928; 97 years ago
- Architect: York & Sawyer
- Architectural style: Renaissance Revival architecture
- NRHP reference No.: 83001720
- NYSRHP No.: 06101.000667
- NYCL No.: 0856, 1804

Significant dates
- Added to NRHP: September 8, 1983
- Designated NYSRHP: August 8, 1983
- Designated NYCL: January 28, 1975 (exterior); December 12, 1993 (interior)

The Apple Bank Building, also known as the Central Savings Bank Building and 2100 Broadway, is a bank and residential building at 2100–2114 Broadway on the Upper West Side of Manhattan in New York City, New York, US. Constructed as a branch of the Central Savings Bank, now Apple Bank, from 1926 to 1928, it occupies a trapezoidal city block bounded by 73rd Street to the south, Amsterdam Avenue to the east, 74th Street to the north, and Broadway to the west. The Apple Bank Building was designed by York and Sawyer in the Renaissance Revival and palazzo styles, patterned after an Italian Renaissance-style palazzo.

The base of the exterior is clad with rusticated stone blocks. Above the first floor, there are double-height arches on all four sides with ornamental ironwork by Samuel Yellin. The fifth and sixth stories are treated like a loggia, with windows separated by pilasters, while the roof is made of Spanish tile. Inside, entrances on 73rd Street, Broadway, and 74th Street lead to ornamental vestibules. The rectangular banking room next to Amsterdam Avenue has sandstone walls, a marble floor, large niches, and a coffered, barrel-vaulted ceiling. A mezzanine overlooks the banking room to the west. The building's basement, formerly a bank vault, serves as a gym. The upper stories contain 29 condominium apartments.

The Central Savings Bank Building opened on December 8, 1928, as an uptown branch of the bank, which at the time was headquartered in Union Square, Manhattan. The upper floors were originally rented out as offices, while the bank occupied the ground floor. The building's facade was made a New York City designated landmark in 1975, and the building was added to the National Register of Historic Places in 1983. The Central Savings Bank merged with the Harlem Savings Bank (later the Apple Bank for Savings) in 1981, and the building continued to operate as a neighborhood bank branch. The banking room was designated as a New York City landmark in 1993. The upper-story offices were converted into condo apartments from 2004 to 2007. Contrary to other large bank buildings in New York City, the Apple Bank Building still contains a bank branch.

== Site ==
The Apple Bank Building is at 2100–2114 Broadway, on the Upper West Side of Manhattan in New York City, New York, US. It occupies a trapezoidal city block bounded by Broadway to the west, 74th Street to the north, Amsterdam Avenue to the east, and 73rd Street to the south. The land lot covers 20,475 square feet (1,902.2 m^{2}), with a frontage of 213.67 feet (65.13 m) on Broadway and a depth of 131.67 feet (40.13 m). The building is near several other structures, including The Ansonia apartments to the west, The Dorilton apartments one block south, and the Hotel Beacon and Beacon Theatre to the north. Directly south of 2100 Broadway is Verdi Square and an entrance for the New York City Subway's 72nd Street station.

Historically, the bank building's site was part of a 19th-century development called Harsenville. The southern part of the site, formerly lot 26, was previously occupied by the five-story Sherman Apartments. James Butler and Peter McDonnell had bought these structures in 1905. The northern part of the site was labeled as lot 32. Thomas J. Powers had bought the northern part of the site in 1861 and sold it to 4 & 6 West 93rd Street Corporation in 1921.

== Architecture ==
The Apple Bank Building, originally the Central Savings Bank Building, was designed by bank architects York and Sawyer for the Central Savings Bank. The structure was designed in the Renaissance Revival and palazzo styles and was patterned after an Italian Renaissance-style palazzo. Prior to the building's construction, York and Sawyer had designed the Bowery Savings Bank Building at 110 East 42nd Street, the Greenwich Savings Bank Building, and the Federal Reserve Bank of New York Building. The building was constructed by general contractor Hegeman-Harris Company. Though the Central Savings Bank Building was designed as a neighborhood branch (as contrasted with the Bowery Savings Bank or Greenwich Savings Bank buildings), its architecture evoked that of a large headquarters such as the Federal Reserve Bank of New York.

The Apple Bank Building houses a branch of the Apple Bank for Savings (previously the Central Savings Bank). In addition, there are 29 condominiums on the upper floors. Though the Apple Bank Building originally contained six full stories excluding mezzanines, the ceilings were so high that the structure was equivalent to an eight- or nine-story building.

=== Facade ===
Each elevation, or side of the building, has a different arrangement of window openings. The facade is divided horizontally into four sections on all elevations: a one-story base, two intermediate sections, and a seventh-story attic. The northwestern corner is a diagonal chamfer.

==== Ground floor ====
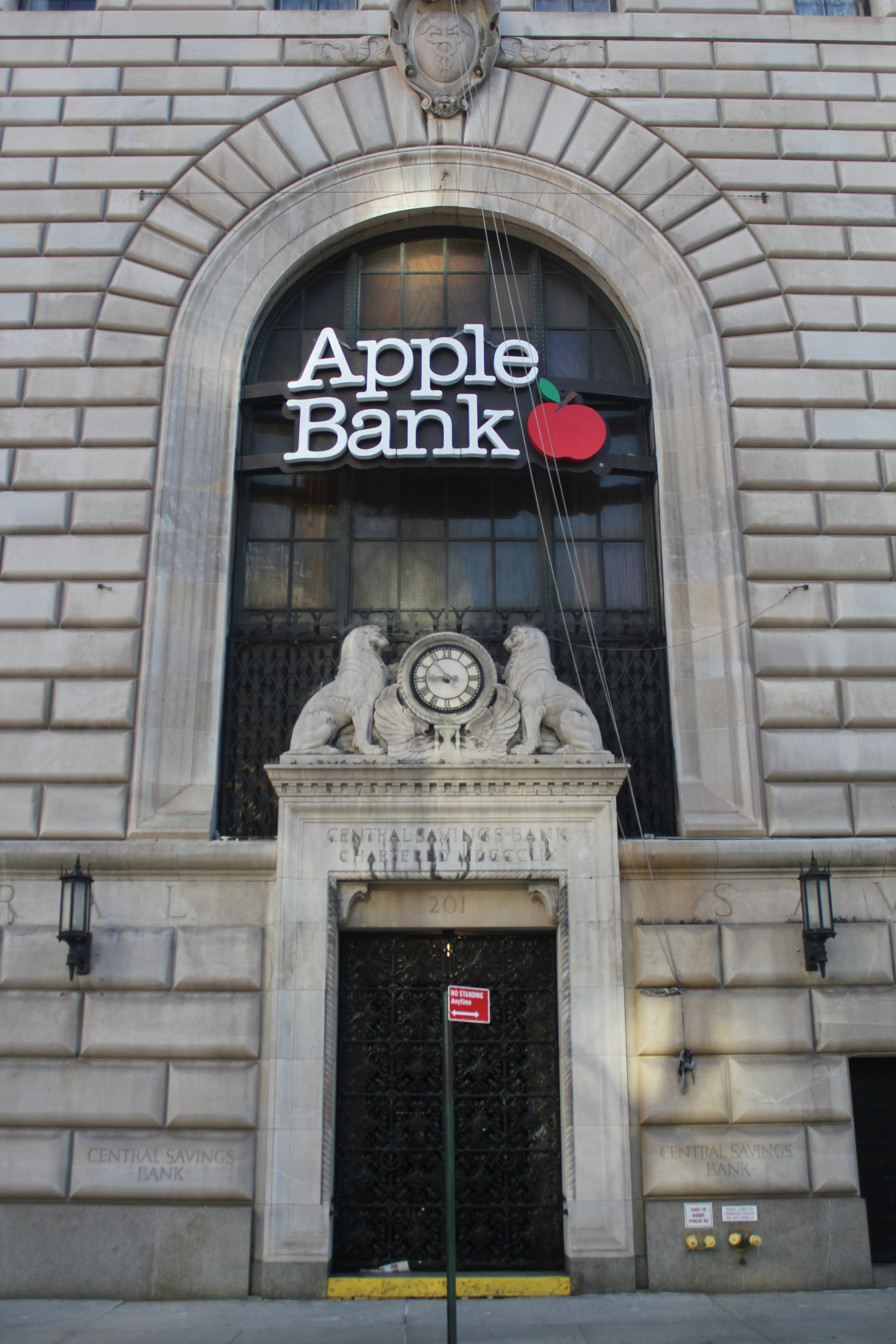
Entrance on 73rd Street

The base of the facade is made of rusticated blocks of limestone. Each limestone block measures up to 2 by 6 feet (0.61 by 1.83 m) across. Above the ground floor is a frieze with a torus molding. The frieze is inscribed with the phrases "Central Savings Bank", "Chartered MDCCCLIX" (referencing the Central Savings Bank's founding in 1859) and "Erected MCMXXVIII" (referencing the building's completion in 1928). These phrases are arranged in different orders on each elevation.

There are entrances along 73rd Street, 74th Street, and Broadway, all surrounded by large stone frames and topped by heavy cornices with denticulation. The center entrance on Broadway is flanked by square windows with metal grilles. A secondary entrance to the building's apartments is at the north end of the Broadway elevation, with the address 2112 Broadway. The northwestern entrance on 74th Street and Broadway contains a wheelchair access ramp. The southern entrance on 73rd Street contains a recessed doorway with a grille in front. Above the 73rd Street entrance's cornice is a clock with a lion to either side; the firm of Ricci and Zari carved the clock and lion out of Indiana limestone. The north elevation on 74th Street has an entrance near the building's northeastern corner. The east elevation on Amsterdam Avenue has square windows with grilles; there are no entrances.

==== Upper stories ====
On the second to fourth stories, each elevation is faced in rusticated limestone blocks similar to those at the base. The second and third stories have double-height arched windows that overlook the banking room. The bottoms of the arches contain wrought-iron grilles with gargoyle heads, manufactured by Samuel Yellin of Philadelphia. The primary elevation faces west on Broadway and contains three arched windows. The east elevation on Amsterdam Avenue has five arched windows. A panel with the inscription "Central Savings Bank 1859–1928", with shields on either side flanked by garlands, is placed above the center arch on both Broadway and Amsterdam Avenue. The outermost bays on Amsterdam Avenue contain rectangular windows on the second and third floors.

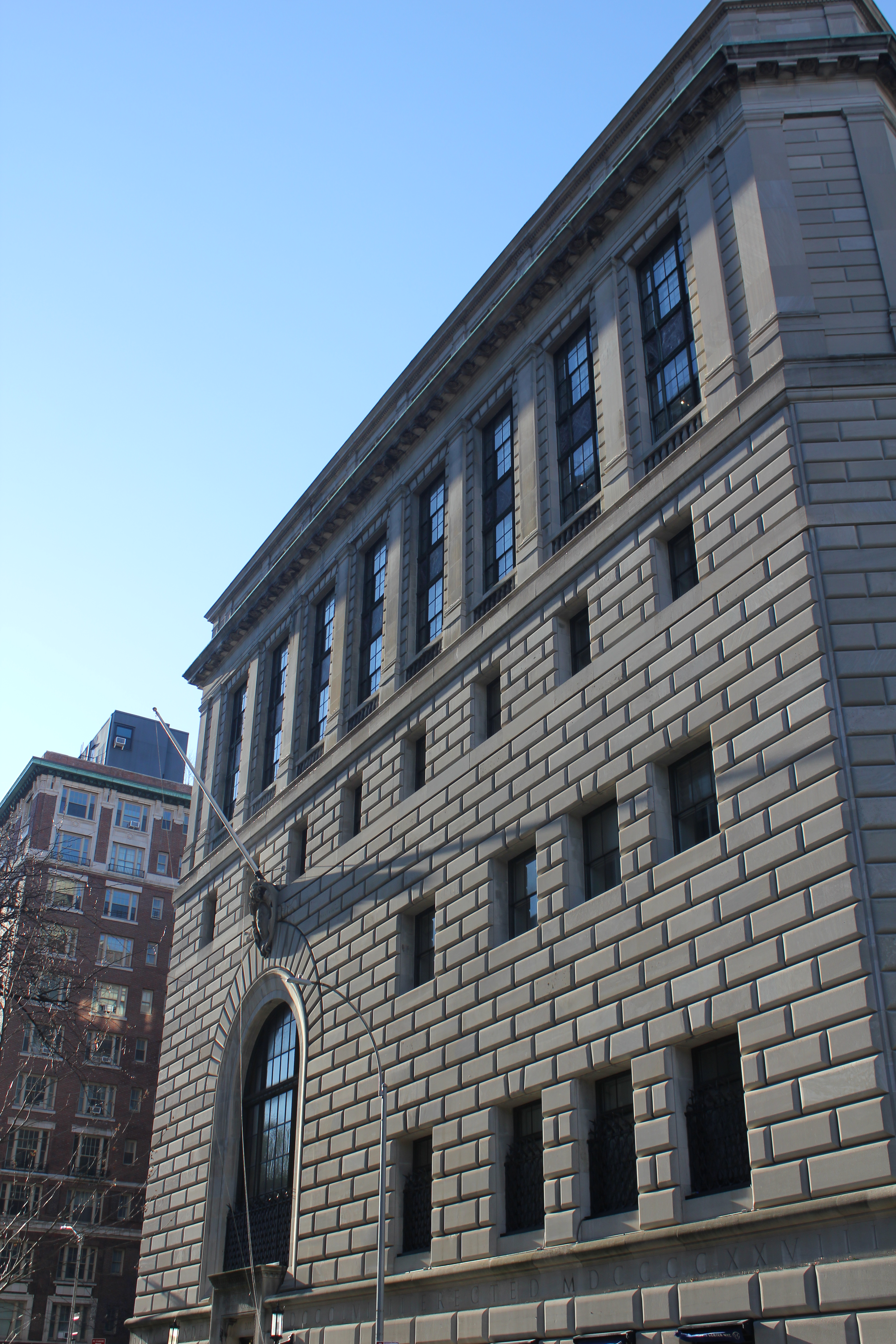
Upper stories of facade on 74th Street

The north elevation on 74th Street has a single arched window on its left (eastern) section. To the right (west) are four bays of rectangular windows on either of the second and third floors, of which three bays are clustered together. The south elevation on 73rd Street has one arched window that takes up much of the facade. A sign displaying the time and temperature is also placed on the 73rd Street elevation. The keystones above these arches have cartouches shaped like shields. Each shield contains a depiction of a caduceus, as well as a flagpole extending diagonally from the top of the shield.

Above the arches, the fourth story has fourteen rectangular windows on Broadway, eighteen on Amsterdam Avenue, eight on 74th Street, and five on 73rd Street. On all sides, there is a horizontal band course above the fourth-story windows. On each elevation, the fifth and sixth stories are treated like a loggia and are divided into the same number of bays as on the fourth story. Each bay contains double-height tripartite windows spanning both stories, with iron spandrels separating the windows on either story. There are also balustrades in front of the lower section of each double-height window, at the fifth story. The bays are separated vertically by pilasters, which in turn are overlaid on rusticated piers. Above is a cornice with modillions, which projects from the facade. The seventh story, above the cornice, includes pairs of windows that correspond to the bays below. There is a sloped Spanish tile roof above.

=== Bank interior ===
Most of the bank is aligned with the axes of Amsterdam Avenue, 74th Street, and 73rd Street. Because Broadway runs diagonally to all three streets, the bank's Broadway entrance vestibule is perpendicular to that street. An entrance foyer, between the Broadway entrance vestibule and the rest of the bank, curves 40 degrees.

==== Vestibules ====
On the west side of the ground floor, leading from Broadway, is a vestibule shaped as an irregular quadrilateral. This vestibule has a floor of polychrome marble strips, surrounded by a black slate border. The walls are made of sandstone paneling above black-slate baseboards and have wrought-iron radiator grilles. The north wall is wider and contains an inscription relating to the building's construction, a gift from the Broadway Association. The metal double doors facing Broadway are flanked by sidelights, which are held in place by iron mullions. The coffered ceiling is made of plaster, which is painted to appear like iron, and contains an iron lantern at its center.

From the Broadway entrance vestibule, a doorway leads east to an foyer with an irregular octagonal plan. A metal-and-glass revolving door, with an incision on its interior, takes up two-thirds of the doorway, while a single plate-glass door occupies the other third. Above these doors is a transom window with six panes; the bottom section of each pane contains wrought-iron flowers, and the panes are held in place by iron mullions. This foyer also has a polychrome marble floor with a black-slate border. As with the vestibule, the walls are made of sandstone paneling above black-slate baseboard and have wrought-iron grilles. The coffered ceiling is also made of plaster and painted to appear like iron. An openwork iron lantern hangs from the center of the ceiling. The east wall of the entrance vestibule contains an architrave on its eastern wall, made of Mondragone marble; this links to the banking room.

There are two more entrance vestibules facing 73rd and 74th Street, which open directly into the banking room and are similar in style. The vestibules consist of revolving doors with incisions on their interiors. The vestibule floors are made of travertine with tesserae, surrounded by a strip of black slate. The vestibules also include plate-glass doors with metal frames. Above each revolving door are plate-glass transoms with ornamental iron panels.

==== Banking room ====
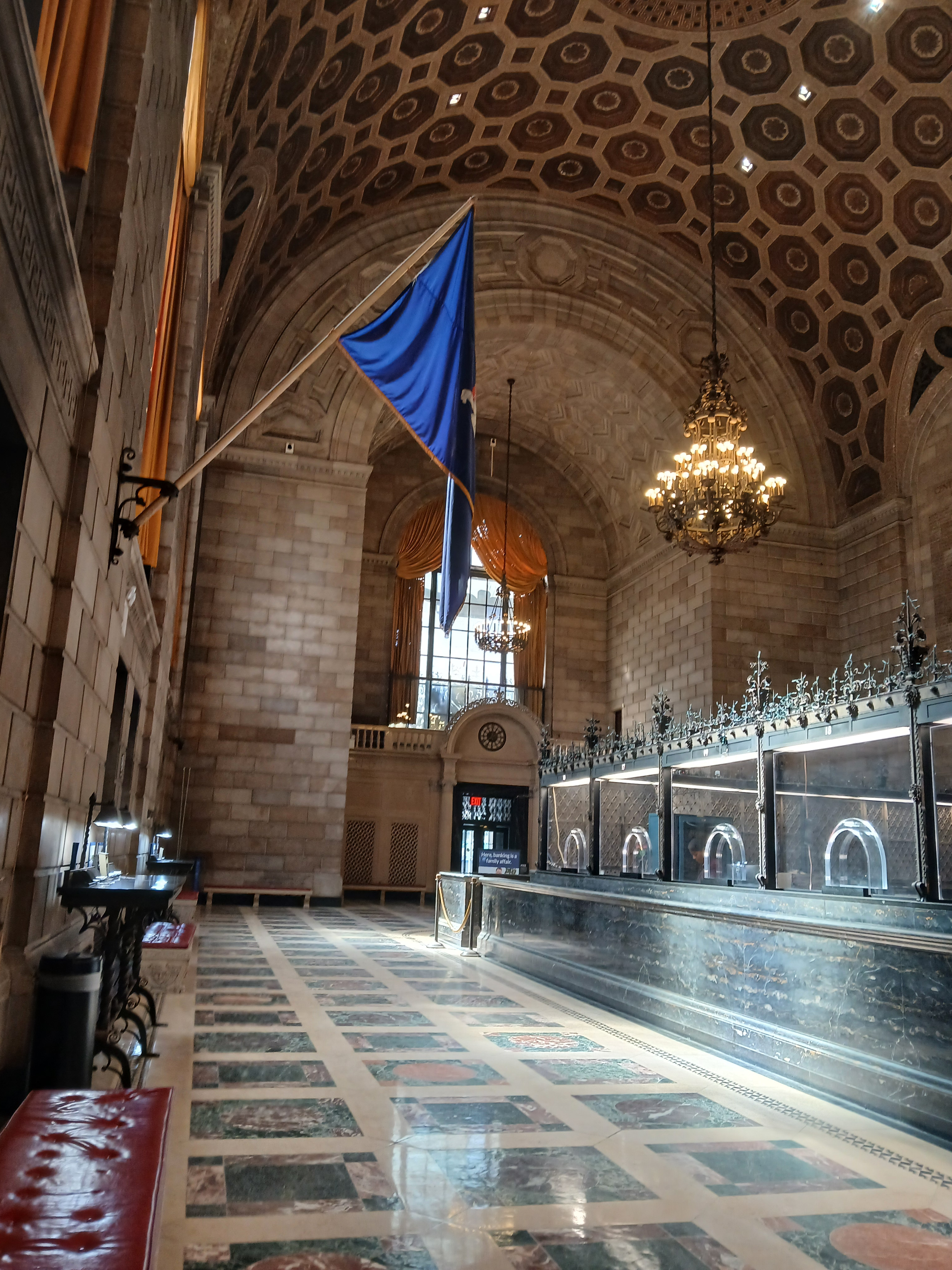
The eastern portion of the banking room, facing south

The floors are paved in multicolored marble squares. The square tiles contain alternating circle and square motifs in one of eight colors. The tellers' counter, at the center of the room, is made of Mondragone marble. South of the main counter is a partial wall that is also made of Mondragone marble. The southern and northern ends of the counter contain bronze counter screens with wrought-iron finials. These screens have entablatures with the words "Industry", "Thrift", and "Prosperity" on the friezes. The New York Times described the screens as resembling a "particularly elegant torture device from the time of Savonarola". In addition, a wrought-iron cresting runs beneath the entire counter. Throughout the banking room, Yellin designed wrought-iron pieces of furniture such as desks, chairs, and lamps. York & Sawyer also placed eight marble benches in the banking room.

The north and south walls of the banking room are made of smooth sandstone blocks with black-slate baseboards. The west and east sides of the banking room each contain six massive piers, which are also designed in sandstone and black slate and flank five arches on either wall. Flagpoles project from the two center piers on either side, with ventilation grilles beneath these piers. The three central arches on the west wall form a loggia, behind which is the mezzanine level. The west wall's outermost arches are blind openings, with inscriptions commemorating the Central Savings Bank's trustees. Underneath the blind openings are architraves of Mondragone marble, beneath which stairways lead up to the mezzanine. The arches on the east wall correspond to the large windows on Amsterdam Avenue, with heating grilles just beneath each window. A frieze with Greek key motifs wraps beneath the arches on the west and east walls. Both the piers and the walls are topped by a cornice with dentils.

To the north and south, above the 73rd and 74th Street entrance vestibules, are barrel-vaulted alcoves with sandstone walls. The side walls contain radiator grilles and the soffits are made of ashlar sandstone panels. The rear walls of the alcoves contain marble screens, above which are round-arched windows. The bottoms of these windows contain glazed railings, held in place by iron standards. Each alcove contains a coffered ceiling with a bronze chandelier. The main barrel-vaulted ceiling is suspended from the upper stories via a steel frame, even though the piers give the appearance of holding up the ceiling. The barrel vault measures 65 feet (20 m) tall. The ceiling surface is covered with gilded octagonal and square coffers throughout, separated by ribs with foliate decoration. Massive bronze chandeliers are suspended from three medallions in the ceiling, which are placed at equal intervals. Each medallion is decorated with three acanthus leaf wreaths, a frieze, and a border of rosettes and Greek key motifs. The friezes contain Latin inscriptions related to banking.

==== Mezzanine ====
The stairs from the mezzanine lead from the northernmost and southernmost arches of the banking room's west wall. Six travertine steps lead westward from the banking room to an intermediate landing. The square landing for each stair contains polychrome marble and travertine surfaces. Above the landings, the northern stair turns south, while the southern stair turns north; both flights of stairs continue upward. The upper flight of each stair has walls made of rusticated sandstone ashlar, as well as a canted ceiling with a segmental-arched cross-section and small coffers. At the top of each stair, a segmental arch leads into the mezzanine.

On the mezzanine's east wall, there are travertine balustrades underneath each of the three arches overlook the banking room. Yellin also made metal handrails and balusters for the mezzanine. The other walls of the mezzanine are made of sandstone ashlar, divided into two sections by a cornice with denticulation. The walls below the cornice are rusticated while the walls above are smooth. The south wall only has one opening, the staircase from the banking room. The north wall is symmetrical with three arches from east to west: the staircase from the banking room, a blind opening, and a doorway to another room. The leftmost arch contains a rectangular opening with a lintel, above which is a window within the arch's architrave. The mezzanine's ceiling has hexagonal and triangular coffers; the ribs between the coffers have a rope motif painted onto them. Three painted bronze chandeliers hang from the ceiling.

Leading off the mezzanine were executive offices with decorations from the Barnet Phillips Company. The meeting rooms of the executive offices had double-height beamed ceilings, as well as wood-paneled walls and ornate imitations of paintings. There were also large fireplaces with torchères on either side. According to one of Barnet Phillips's brochures, the ceilings were inspired by Florence's Palazzo Davanzati.

=== Other interior spaces ===
The top four floors originally contained offices that were rented to other tenants. These offices were arranged around a corridor that wrapped around the building in a trapezoidal shape. Each office's doors were largely made of solid metal, with brass doorknobs, though the tops of each door had frosted-glass panes. The walls had marble wainscoting and brass sign boards. Through the beginning of the 21st century, the doors' original ornamentation was kept in their original condition; the doors still worked properly 75 years after they were installed. Though the spaces had been repainted multiple times, the paint schemes always complemented the original design. The highest floor contained "rest rooms" and a dining room for the Central Savings Bank's officers.

The bank's basement contained vault doors weighing 60 short tons (54 long tons; 54 t) each, designed by Frederick S. Holmes The basement covers 15,000 square feet (1,400 m^{2}) and is used as a baseball and softball facility, which opened in 2000.

==== Residences ====
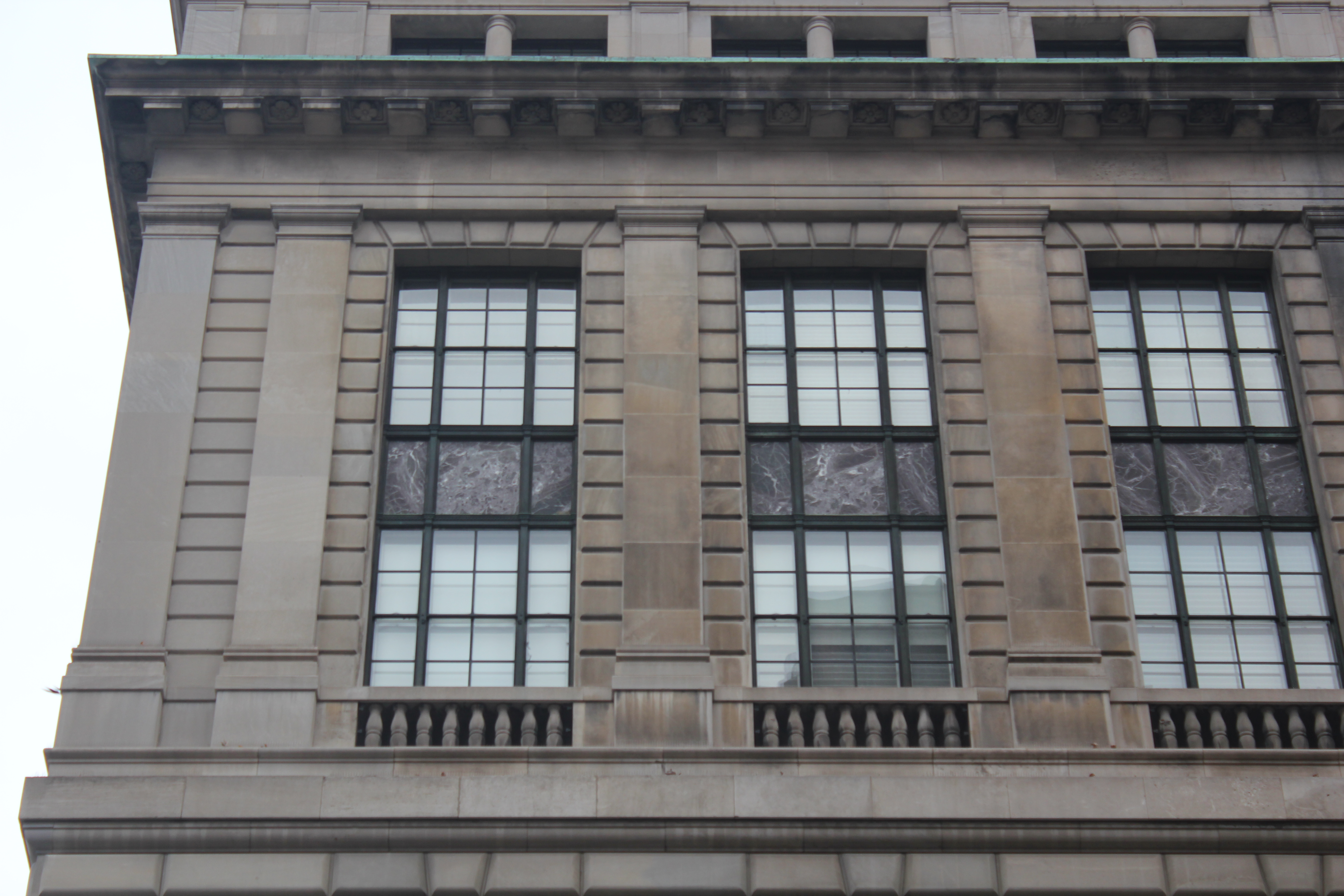
The Apple Bank Condo development is on the upper floors of the building.

In 2006, the seven upper stories were converted into a residential condominium development known as Apple Bank Condo. The residential section of the building is accessed by its own entrance at 2112 Broadway, with a concierge area designed by Beyer Blinder Belle. There are 29 apartments in the building, each with a different arrangement. The apartments have one to four bedrooms and range from 1,360 to 4,055 square feet (126.3 to 376.7 m^{2}). The top two stories of the building contain six duplex units. The residential units also have a shared exercise room, laundry service, and pet shower. Because the bank at ground level remains active, there is no mailroom or basement storage room, and mail carriers deliver mail directly to the residents. In addition, the exercise room and the residential lobby each take up only 1,000 square feet (93 m^{2}).

In each apartment, the floors are made of dark wood, while the kitchens have flecked-granite surfaces. One such unit is a two-bedroom condo with a large fireplace in the living room; French doors leading to both bedrooms; and a hallway, walk-in closet, and bathroom for the main bedroom. The apartments below the duplexes have 13-foot-tall (4.0 m) ceilings and are illuminated by 8.5-foot-tall (2.6 m) windows. Each of the duplexes has an interior courtyard, which corresponds to the locations of the ceiling trusses inside.

== History ==
The German Savings Bank was founded in 1859 and was originally housed in the Cooper Union Building in the East Village of Manhattan. The original name reflected the bank's clientele, the largely German population of the East Village. The original headquarters was relocated in 1864 to the Napier House at Union Square, which itself was replaced in 1872 by a four-story bank building. The German Savings Bank was renamed the Central Savings Bank in 1918, during World War I, likely due to a wartime rise in anti-German sentiment. Each savings bank in New York was limited to one location until 1923, when the state legislature passed a law allowing savings banks to construct branches. The Central Savings Bank's directors organized a special committee to determine the feasibility of opening a new branch, as well as possible sites for such a branch.

=== Development ===
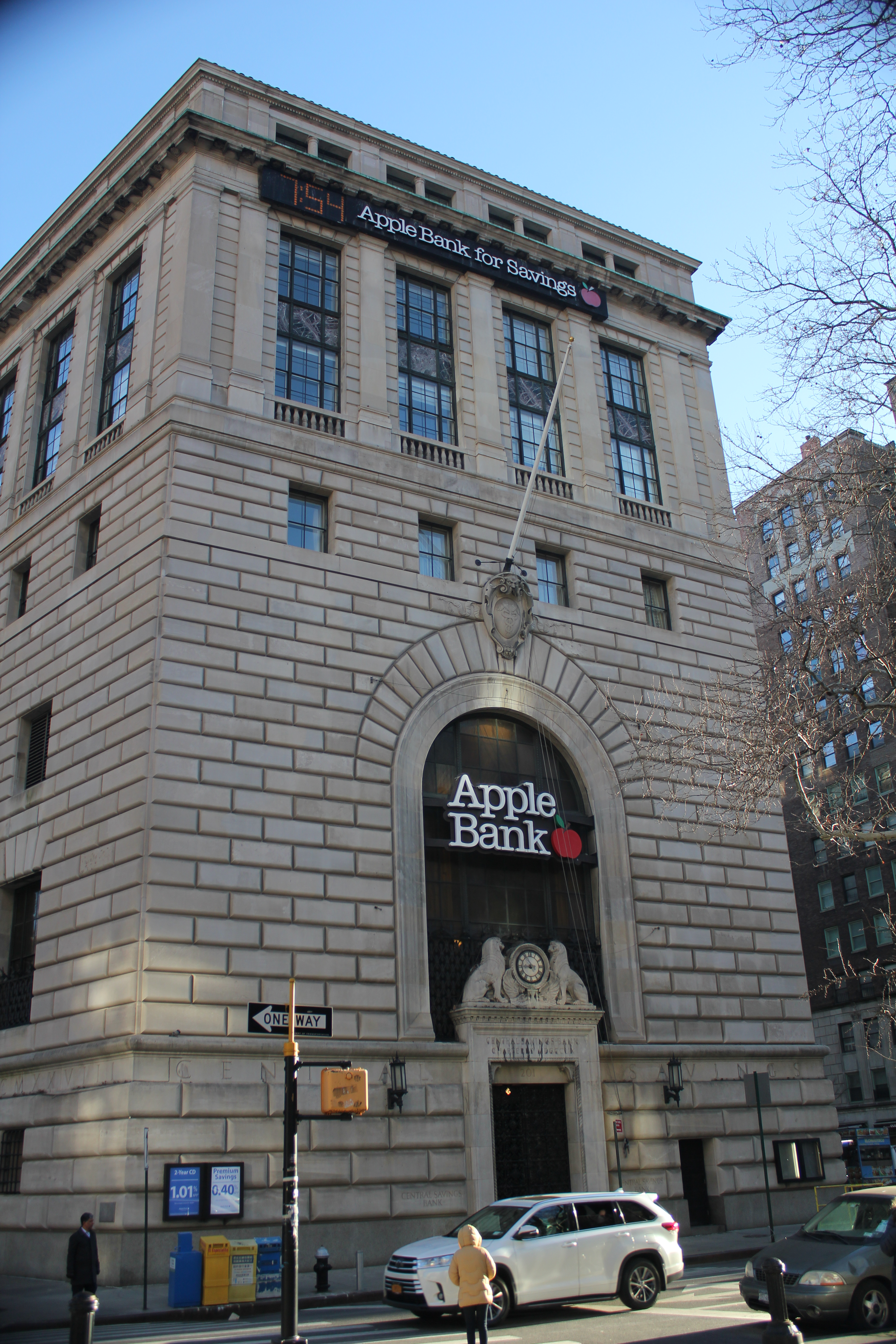
View of the building from Verdi Square

By July 1923, the bank's special committee had identified a site bounded by Broadway, Amsterdam Avenue, and 73rd and 74th Streets; bank president Hubert Cellis said it was "the choicest location on the West Side". In November 1923, the Central Savings Bank acquired the Sherman Apartments on the north side of 73rd Street, occupying the entire 69-foot (21 m) frontage between Broadway and Amsterdam Avenue, for the construction of an uptown bank branch. The bank paid James Butler and Peter McDonnell $1 million for the site. The Central Savings Bank then decided to pause its acquisitions, as there were tenants on the block whose leases did not expire until 1926. The bank signed a lease for a temporary branch at 77th Street and Broadway in March 1924.

The Central Savings Bank planned to restart its land acquisitions in July 1925, but the process was delayed by Cellis's death the next month. In January 1926, the bank acquired the northern half of the block from Paul Henry Zagat for $1.65 million. Meanwhile, Adolph Koppel had become the bank's new president and August Zinsser was appointed the vice president. The two men led a new-building committee, which released a detailed report of the new building in March 1926, including a 70-to-80-foot-tall (21 to 24 m) banking room, which had been envisioned for three years. York and Sawyer created the designs for the new bank building, which the bank's directors approved. After Koppel died in August 1926, Zinsser became the bank's president and continued to oversee the development of the new building. The new branch would contain the Central Savings Bank's executive and investment departments. York and Sawyer submitted plans for the bank building to the New York City Department of Buildings in December 1926.

Zinsser hired Spencer, White & Prentis, Inc. to clear the site and excavate foundations in January 1927. The Hegeman-Harris Company was hired as the building's general contractor that May, and construction on the building commenced the same month. That June, the National Park Bank also leased space in the building for a smaller bank branch. The Central Savings Bank gave craftsmanship awards to 15 mechanics involved in the building's construction in March 1928. By that July, the National Park Bank had opened a branch in the building, and Wood, Dolson & Co. were renting out the completed upper floors as offices. The Broadway Association placed a commemorative tablet on the Central Savings Bank Building's facade upon the structure's completion. The structure had a total estimated cost of $6.5 million. The Central Savings Bank continued to operate its Union Square branch even after the Upper West Side branch opened.

=== 1920s to 1970s ===
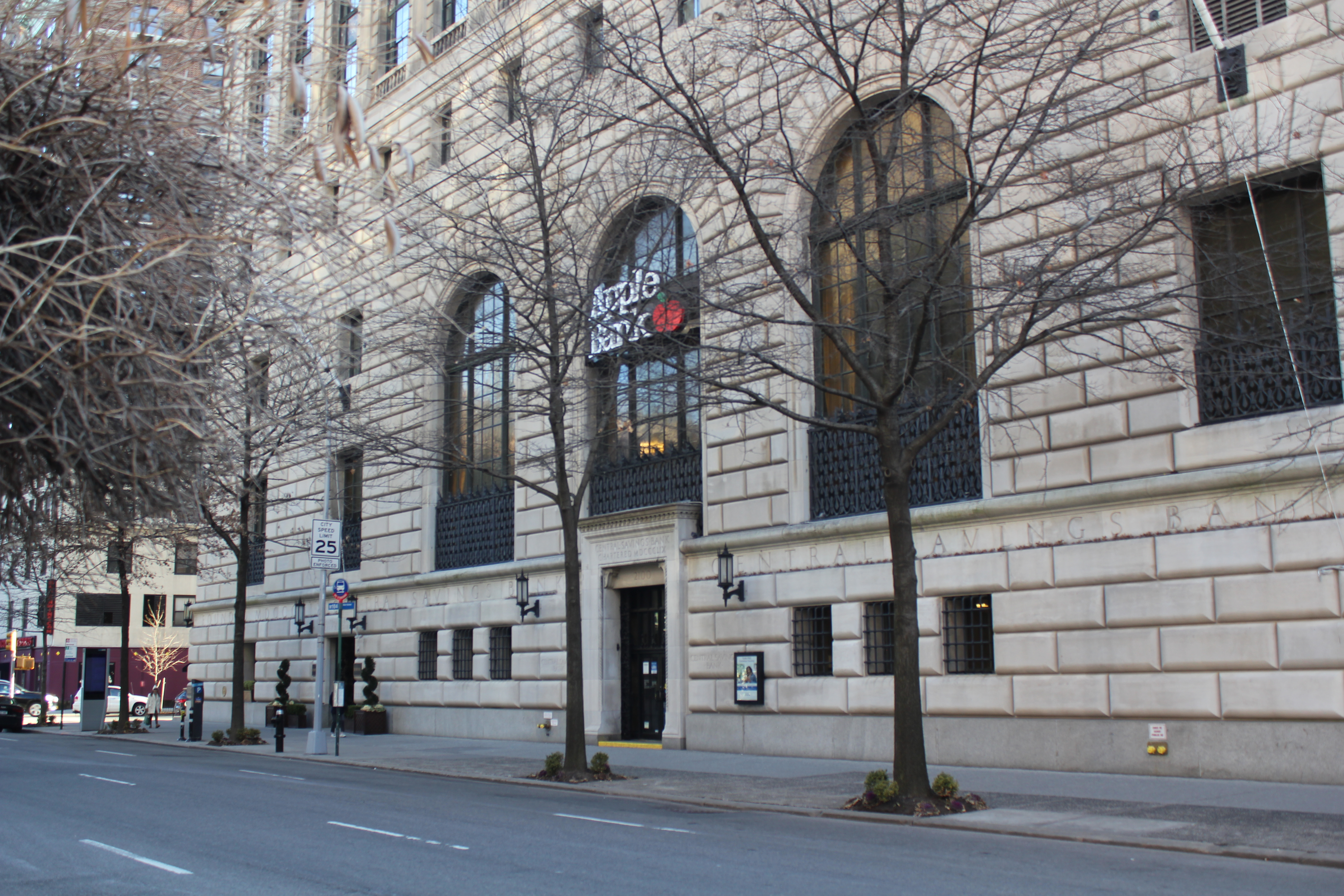
Broadway banking entrance

The bank branch officially opened on December 8, 1928. Just prior to the building's opening, $170 million of deposits held by the Central Savings Bank were moved from the Union Square branch to the new branch, using 16 armored cars guarded by 60 heavily armed policemen. Early office tenants included real estate developer Ralph Ciluzzi, J.S. Ansorge & Co., and the Rosalind Realty Company. Many of the tenants were medical offices and dentists. By its 75th anniversary in 1934, the Central Savings Bank had over $212 million in assets, and it was New York state's third-largest bank by number of depositors and the fifth-largest by value of deposits. The building also hosted events such as an exhibition of old toy banks in 1938.

The Chase National Bank operated a branch on the 74th Street side of the building by 1943. The bank submitted plans for a minor alteration of the building to the New York City Department of Buildings in 1947. Office tenants continued to occupy the Central Savings Bank Building, including the Atlantic District of the Lutheran Church in America, real-estate developer Arturo A. Campagna, and real-estate firm Mark Rafalsky & Co. in the 1950s and 1960s. Upon the bank's centennial in 1959, the New York City government presented the building with a scroll in 1959, recognizing the bank's "service to local economic welfare" by teaching local students about "thrift". Also in 1959, the bank's basement was flooded when a water main in the adjacent IRT Broadway–Seventh Avenue Line subway tunnel broke. A sign displaying the time and temperature was mounted onto the southern facade of the building in 1961. Over the years, Yellin's ironwork for the bank building was neglected, as the Central Savings Bank was indifferent about maintaining the iron decorations.

The New York City Landmarks Preservation Commission (LPC) proposed designating the building's facade and the banking room's interior as landmarks in 1974. The LPC had gained the authority to grant interior landmark statuses the previous year, and the Central Savings Bank was the first bank interior that the LPC considered. However, bank officials were skeptical that the interior had architectural or historical significance. The Central Savings Bank Building's facade was designated as a landmark on January 28, 1975, along with the neighboring Verdi Square; the New York City Board of Estimate ratified the designations that March.

=== 1980s to present ===
By the early 1980s, the Central Savings Bank was struggling financially and the Manhattan Savings Bank proposed taking over. At the time, the 2100 Broadway branch served as the Central Savings Bank's headquarters, and the bank had seven other locations in Manhattan and on Long Island. In 1981, the Central Savings Bank was merged into the Harlem Savings Bank, which had eight locations in Manhattan and on Long Island. The Harlem Savings Bank retained headquarters at 205 East 42nd Street, and 2100 Broadway became a neighborhood branch. To reflect its geographic expansion, the bank changed its name to Apple Bank in May 1983. The time-and-temperature sign on the facade was temporarily removed so the bank's new name could be installed. Later that year, the Apple Bank Building was added to the National Register of Historic Places, with officials citing the building's importance as "Manhattan's only free-standing bank building". (Note: The Federal Reserve Bank of New York Building is also freestanding but was not a savings bank.) Office tenants such as Siris/Coombs Architects continued to take up the upper floors.

The Apple Bank Building continued to host events, including a 1988 display of planned skyscrapers on the Upper West Side and a 1989 auction of artwork to fund protests against Donald Trump's proposed development of the nearby Trump City. With the closure or downsizing of bank branches in the late 20th century, the LPC proposed designating several major bank interiors in 1990, including the Apple Bank Building, the Manufacturers Hanover Building, and the Greenwich Savings Bank Building. Apple Bank had retained the banking room's original design; in one case, the bank declined to place bulletproof glass on the tellers' counter because that would have required removing the wrought-iron screens. However, Apple Bank opposed the interior-landmark designation, saying it would hinder day-to-day operations. The bank cited the fact that the "business centers" of two landmarked restaurants, the kitchens of the Four Seasons Restaurant and Gage and Tollner, were unprotected. Even so, the LPC designated the banking room as an interior landmark on December 21, 1993.

Apple Bank's sole owner Stanley Stahl died in 1999, but the Stahl Organization retained an ownership interest in the bank's operation. By 2000, the bank's basement had been converted into a gym operated by Frozen Ropes LLC. The office tenants included real-estate firms Brown Harris Stevens (which occupied most of the mezzanine), Douglas Elliman, and Corcoran Group. In 2004, Apple Bank indicated that it would let the leases of the building's office tenants lapse. Over the next year, the remaining office tenants relocated from the building. Subsequently, the office floors were turned into residential condominiums. Brown Harris Stevens, one of the tenants that had been forced to relocate, was placed in charge of leasing the building's residential condominiums.

Condo sales launched in July 2006, with prices ranging from $1.8 million to $6.7 million. Two-fifths of the condos had gone into contract by the end of the year. Sales for the duplexes atop the building commenced in June 2007. Among the residents were singer Harry Belafonte, who in 2007 took two adjacent condos, and basketball player Emeka Okafor, who bought a condo in 2013. The condominium conversion was completed in 2007, with some units selling for $4 million. Meanwhile, the bank branch at the building's base remained in operation, even as the city's other massive banking rooms were converted into banquet halls or residential lobbies. (Note: For example, the Greenwich Savings Bank Building and the Bowery Savings Bank branches at 130 Bowery and 110 East 42nd Street were turned into banquet halls, while the Williamsburgh Savings Bank Tower became a residential lobby.)

== Reception ==
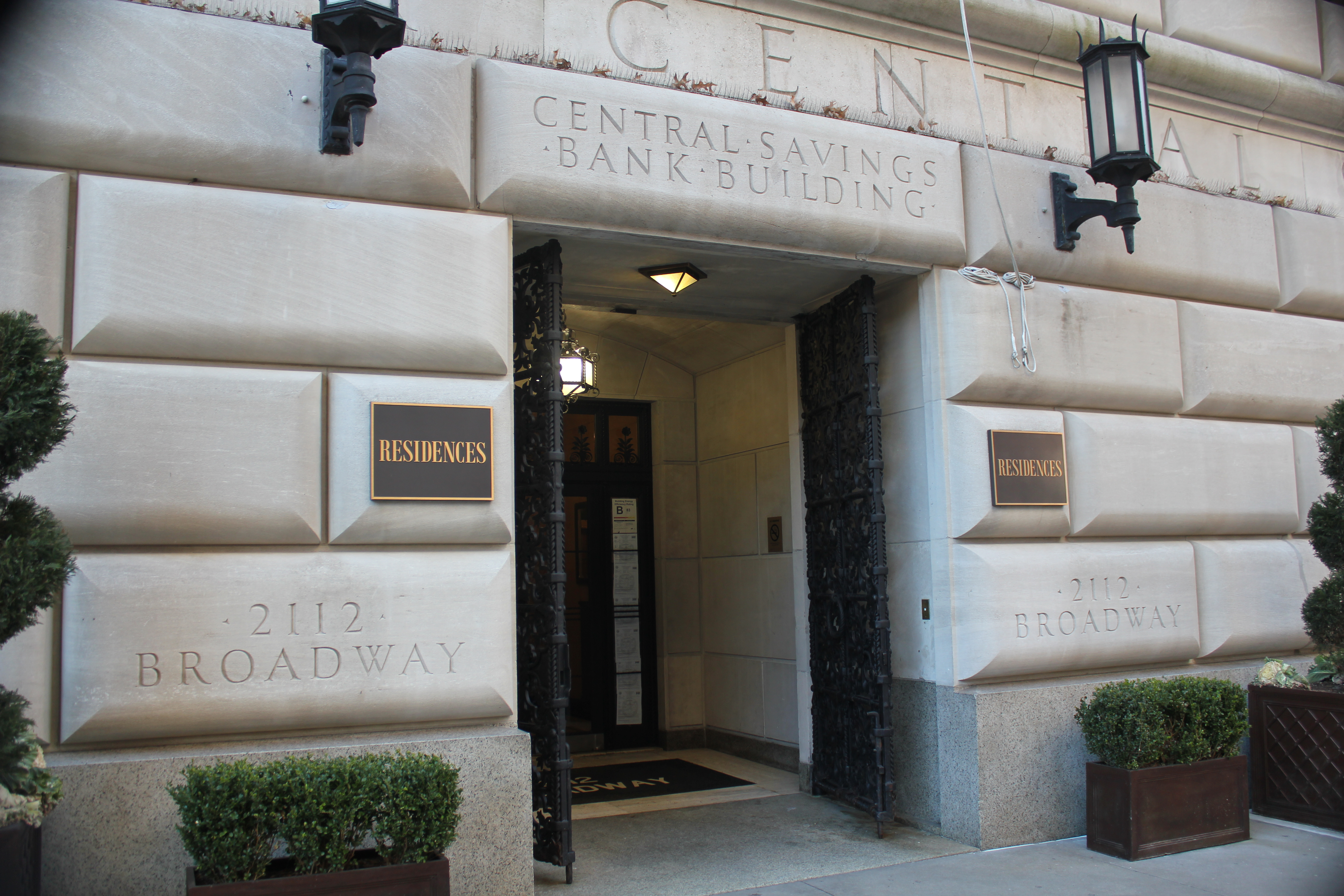
Residential entrance

When the Central Savings Bank Building was completed, The New York Times described it as one of Broadway's "finest commercial structures". Charles J. Quintan, the building's renting agent, said the building's completion "indicates that the conservative bankers have placed their stamp of approval on this section of the city by undertaking such a large proposition". Architecture and Building characterized the building as "an ornament to its location". Conversely, George S. Chappell wrote in The New Yorker that he found the southern elevation to be "rather distressing", saying: "I had the feeling that it was intended to be square but had been pushed out of alignment".

In the late 20th century, David W. Dunlap of the Times wrote: "To call the Apple Bank for Savings [...] a neighborhood branch bank is like calling Grand Central Terminal a commuter train station." Paul Goldberger of the Times described the banking room as "one of New York's great banking rooms" designed by York and Sawyer, along with the Bowery Savings Bank at 110 East 42nd Street. The building's architecture inspired that of the Laureate, a condominium building constructed nearby during the 2000s.

== See also ==
- List of buildings and structures on Broadway in Manhattan
- List of New York City Designated Landmarks in Manhattan from 59th to 110th Streets
- National Register of Historic Places listings in Manhattan from 59th to 110th Streets
- Similar bank buildings in New York City:
  - Brooklyn Trust Company Building, also designed by York and Sawyer
  - Dollar Savings Bank Building
