= Apple Bank =

Savings bank in the northeastern US

Apple Bank for Savings
- Type: Private
- Industry: Banking
- Founded: April 17, 1863; 163 years ago as the Haarlem Savings Bank
- Headquarters: Manhasset, New York, U.S.
- Number of locations: 75+ branches (2025)
- Area served: New York metropolitan area, New Jersey
- Key people: Steven C. Bush (chairman, president and CEO)
- Services: Consumer banking, Commercial banking, Mortgage lending, Equipment finance
- Revenue: ▲US$ 378 million (2024)
- Net income: ▲US$ 63 million (2025)
- Total assets: ▲US$ 17.5 billion (2024)
- Total equity: ▲US$ 1.6 billion (2025)
- Owner: Trust for the benefit of heirs of Stanley Stahl
- Number of employees: 1,001 (2018)
- Parent: Apple Financial Holdings
- Website: applebank.com
- Harlem Savings Bank
- U.S. National Register of Historic Places
- Location within New York
- Location: 124 E. 125th St., New York, New York
- Coordinates: 40°48′13″N 73°56′20″W
- Area: less than one acre
- Built: 1907
- Built by: Wakeman & Miller
- Architects: Bannister & Schell
- Architectural style: Classical Revival
- NRHP reference No.: 03000849
- Added to NRHP: August 28, 2003

Apple Bank for Savings is a savings bank headquartered in Manhasset, New York and operating in the New York metropolitan area and New Jersey. With over $17 billion in assets and more than 75 branches as of 2024, it is the largest state-chartered savings bank in New York.

== History ==
=== 19th century ===
The company was founded in 1863 as the Haarlem Savings Bank by a group of local merchants as a community-based mutual savings bank – a bank owned by its depositors rather than outside shareholders. Harlem at the time was a suburban village—it was not part of New York City until 1873—and the bank's first location on 3rd Avenue between 125th and 126th Streets was surrounded by farms and undeveloped lots. In 1869, the bank moved to a building of its own construction on 3rd Avenue and 124th Street. By mid-1876 the bank had 5,074 depositors. The Harlem Savings Bank building was listed on the National Register of Historic Places in 2003.

=== 20th century ===
In 1907, the bank moved its headquarters to 124 E. 125th St.

In 1932, in the first years of the Great Depression, the bank acquired Commonwealth Savings Bank and its 2 branches. The branches were on 157th Street and 180th Street in Washington Heights, Manhattan. In 1933, the bank dropped the double 'a' from its name to match the now-standard spelling of the neighborhood's name: Harlem.

In 1966, the bank opened a branch in Manhasset, New York, on Long Island as the population growth shifted to the suburbs. In 1968, the bank moved its headquarters from Harlem to 42nd Street.

In 1981, in a deal organized by the Federal Deposit Insurance Corporation that included a $160 million grant from the agency, the bank acquired the troubled Central Savings Bank. Created as the German Savings Bank in 1858, Central Savings Bank counted Daniel F. Tiemann, then Mayor of New York, as a charter member and operated out of the Cooper Union building before moving to a location at 14th Street and 4th Avenue in 1864.

The acquisition gave the bank an additional seven branches including the Apple Bank Building at 2112 Broadway between West 73rd and West 74th Streets, a designated historic landmark designed by York and Sawyer in the Palazzo style of Renaissance Revival architecture, as well as two branches in Nassau County on Long Island.

In the 1970s and early 1980s, the bank continued to expand into the suburbs outside New York City. To reflect its geographic expansion, the bank changed its name to Apple Bank in May 1983. The name referenced New York City's popular nickname, the Big Apple.

In 1985, the bank converted from a mutual savings bank to a public company, selling 4.6 million shares for $53.5 million in an initial public offering.

On December 31, 1986, the bank acquired Eastern Savings Bank, obtaining three branches in the Bronx, two in Westchester, and two on Long Island.

In 1989, the bank acquired Sag Harbor Savings Bank and its 5 branches for $29.5 million. Sag Harbor Savings Bank was chartered in 1860 in Sag Harbor, New York to provide financial services for the whaling industry.

In 1990, Stanley Stahl, the developer of 277 Park Avenue, acquired the bank for $174 million. The purchase price was below the book value of the bank, and the bank initially rejected the bid and adopted a poison pill to prevent the takeover. Stahl fought the poison pill. Shareholders supported the merger after the stock price fell during the early 1990s recession.

In 1991, William J. Laraia became chairman and chief executive officer of the bank. Laraia reduced the commercial loan portfolio and cut costs significantly.

In 1994, Alan Shamoon became the chief executive officer of the bank. In August 1999, Stahl died and ownership of the bank passed to trusts.

=== 21st century ===
On April 20, 2013, Apple Bank acquired 29 branches and the related deposit accounts and services from Emigrant Savings Bank. This acquisition gave Apple a total of 77 branches in the New York metropolitan area and close to $13 billion in assets.

In May 2015, the bank opened a branch in the Jackson Heights section of Queens.

In June 2015, the bank opened a second branch in the Bay Ridge section of Brooklyn, at 426 86th Street.

In October 2015, the bank opened a branch in Monsey, New York.

In April 2016, Steven C. Bush became chairman, president, and chief executive officer of the bank.

In February 2021, Apple Bank was fined $12.5 million by the Federal Deposit Insurance Corporation for violations of the Bank Secrecy Act related to anti-money laundering controls.

In May 2022, Apple Bank established an Equipment Finance Group, led by Ken Walters and a team of seven, as part of its growing Commercial and Industrial lending practice.

In September 2022, the bank expanded its branch network with the opening of its first New Jersey branch in Englewood, New Jersey. A second New Jersey branch subsequently opened in Iselin.

In April 2025, Apple Bank opened a third New Jersey branch at 140 East Kennedy Boulevard in Lakewood, New Jersey.

== Community involvement ==
Apple Bank operates a Community Reinvestment Act (CRA) program focused on affordable housing, community services, economic development, and community revitalization. In its January 2019 performance evaluation, the New York State Department of Financial Services rated the bank's CRA record "Satisfactory".

== Financial overview ==
As of December 31, 2024, Apple Bank reported total assets of $17.464 billion, deposits of $14.5 billion, revenue of $378 million, net income of $32.3 million, and stockholders' equity of $1.503 billion. According to the bank's financial report, Apple Bank has maintained profitability for over 32 consecutive years.
