= Cullen and Dykman LLP =

American law firm

- Headquarters: Uniondale, New York, United States
- No. of offices: 8
- Offices: Uniondale, New York, New York, New York, Albany, New York, Hackensack, New Jersey, Newark, New Jersey, Princeton, New Jersey, Washington, D.C. and Palm Beach, Florida
- No. of attorneys: Nearly 200 (2026)
- No. of employees: 300 (2026)
- Key people: Christopher H. Palmer, Managing Partner
- Date founded: 1850
- Company type: Limited liability partnership
- Website: www.cullenllp.com

Cullen and Dykman LLP is an American law firm founded in Brooklyn in 1850 and headquartered in Uniondale, New York.Genn, Adina (January 29, 2025). "In Uniondale, law firm honors its 175-year roots". Long Island Business News.Genn, Adina (July 19, 2023). "Law firm relocates HQ to Uniondale". Long Island Business News. As of 2026, the firm operated eight offices in New York, New Jersey, Washington, D.C., and Florida.Genn, Adina (March 3, 2026). "Law firm with LI office opens in Palm Beach". Long Island Business News.

== History ==
=== Origins and early years ===
Cullen and Dykman LLP traces its origins to 1850, when Alexander McCue, who later became a judge, began practicing law in Brooklyn, New York. Twenty years later, McCue joined two distinguished Brooklyn lawyers to form the firm McCue, Hall and Cullen. One partner, Edgar M. Cullen, later became Chief Judge of the New York Court of Appeals, a role he held from 1904 to 1913.

In 1867, McCue served as one of the incorporators of the New York and Brooklyn Bridge Company. The firm—through Edgar M. Cullen, James G. Bergen, and later William N. Dykman — acted as counsel in significant litigation involving patents, claims, and negligence related to the Brooklyn Bridge.

William N. Dykman joined as an associate in 1878, and by 1880, Edgar M. Cullen had been elected to the New York Supreme Court. In the early 20th century, Cullen and Dykman maintained offices in the Brooklyn Trust Company Building. After retiring as Chief Judge of the New York Court of Appeals in 1914, Cullen returned to the firm in 1915, at which point the firm officially adopted the name Cullen and Dykman. Despite its growing size, the firm retained this name going forward.

Judge Edgar M. Cullen died in 1922. Upon his death, Presiding Justice Abel E. Blackmar noted, "Judge Cullen left his imprint upon the body of the law, and his opinions, which enrich all legal literature, will long be cited as authorities…".

In 1937, the firm lost William N. Dykman, who had served as president of the New York State Bar Association and held prominent public roles, including memberships on the District Board of New York City and the Civil Service Commission under Mayor Van Wyck and Low.

=== Recent history ===
In 1955, Fred L. Space—then the firm's Managing Clerk—retired briefly to dedicate himself to compiling and preserving over a century's worth of firm records and history, an effort that required three large warehouse rooms.

In 2003, Cullen and Dykman merged with Bleakley Platt Remsen Millham & Curran, a move reported by Crain's New York Business as expanding the firm's Manhattan presence and deepening its banking and real estate practice.

In 2019, an analysis by The Real Deal ranked Cullen and Dykman first by total commercial loan volume in Brooklyn, Queens, and the Bronx. The firm also handled the largest number of commercial debt transactions in each of the four boroughs included in the analysis."The debt duelers". The Real Deal. November 2019.

In 2025, the Higher Education and Bankruptcy and Real Estate teams successfully closed the sale of The College of Saint Rose campus to the Albany County Pine Hills Land Authority for $35,000,000, as part of the college's Chapter 11 bankruptcy proceeding in the U.S. Bankruptcy Court for the Northern District of New York.

As of today, the firm has evolved from Judge McCue's one-partner Brooklyn practice into a leading regional law firm serving New York, New Jersey, Washington, D.C., and Florida.

=== Expansion milestones ===
- 1966: Following a merger with the firm of George L. "Loring" Hubbell Jr., Cullen and Dykman opened an office in Garden City.Genn, Adina (January 29, 2025). "In Uniondale, law firm honors its 175-year roots". Long Island Business News.
- 1978: The firm opened its Washington, D.C. office to better serve the utility and energy clients involved in federal regulatory matters.
- 2003: Cullen and Dykman merged with Manhattan-based Bleakley Platt Remsen Millham & Curran.LIBN Staff (November 29, 2002). "NYC firm joining Cullen & Dykman". Long Island Business News.
- 2012: The firm opened an office in Albany to meet the growing demands for legal services in the state's capital and throughout upstate New York.
- 2016: New Jersey law firm Sokol Behot joined Cullen and Dykman, adding offices in Hackensack, Newark, and Princeton.Weynand, Jillian (June 24, 2016). "Cullen and Dykman to join forces with NJ law firm". Long Island Business News.
- 2023: The firm relocated its headquarters from Garden City to the Omni Building in Uniondale.Genn, Adina (July 19, 2023). "Law firm relocates HQ to Uniondale". Long Island Business News.
- 2026: The firm opened its eighth office in Palm Beach, Florida.Genn, Adina (March 3, 2026). "Law firm with LI office opens in Palm Beach". Long Island Business News.

== Practice areas ==
Cullen and Dykman's practices include banking and financial services, bankruptcy and creditors' rights, corporate law, energy and utilities, environmental law, real estate, construction, commercial litigation, labor and employment, higher education, and trusts and estates."Practice Areas". Cullen and Dykman LLP.

== See also ==
- Brooklyn Bridge
- Edgar M. Cullen
