= Edgar M. Cullen =

American judge (1843–1922

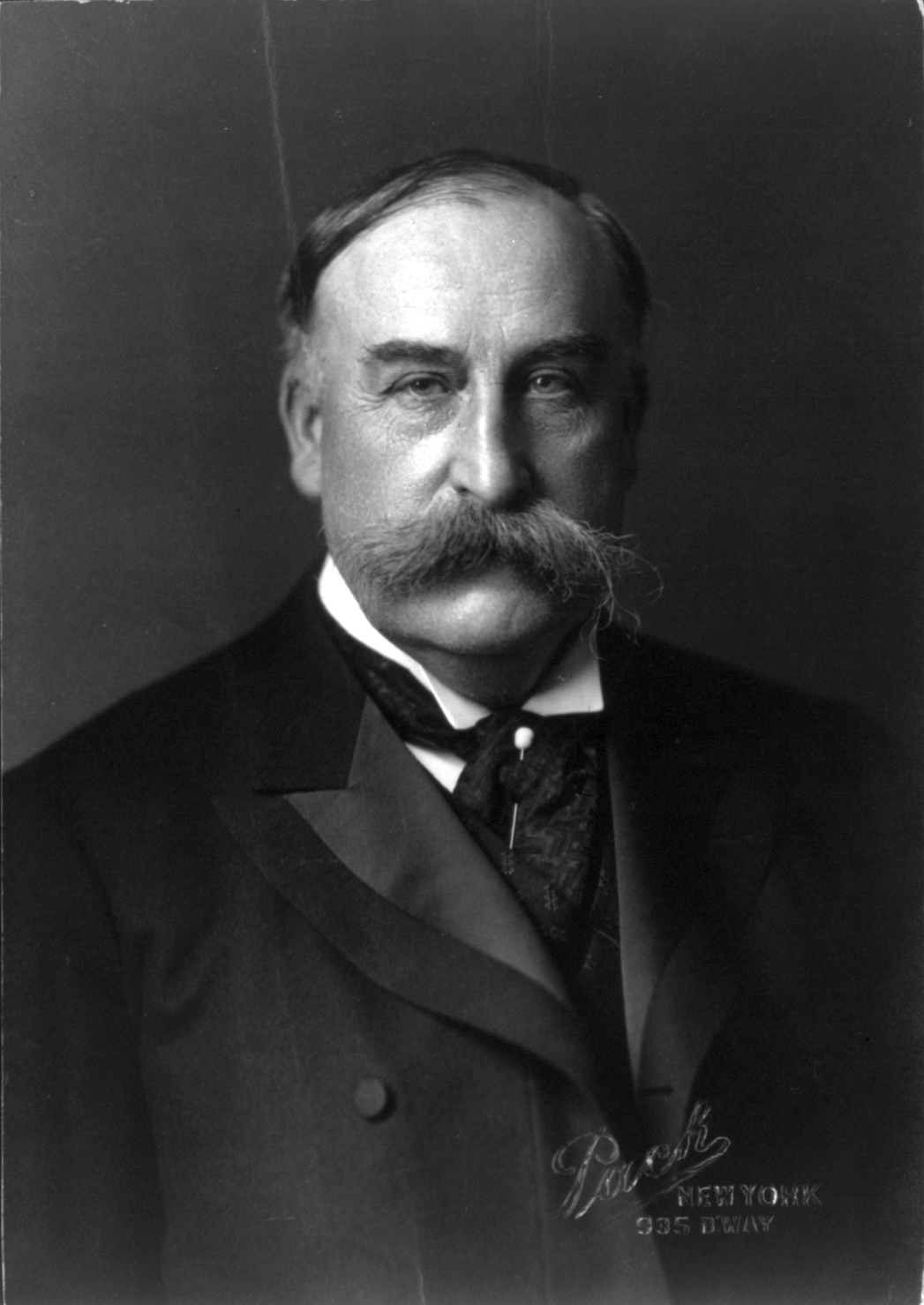
- Judge Edgar M. Cullen, circa 1913.

Chief Judge of the New York Court of Appeals
- In office 1904–1913

Associate Judge of the New York Court of Appeals
- In office 1900–1904

Justice of the New York Supreme Court
- In office 1880–1900

Personal details
- Born: December 4, 1843 Brooklyn, New York
- Died: May 23, 1922 (aged 78) Brooklyn, New York
- Resting place: Green-Wood Cemetery
- Party: Democratic
- Education: Columbia College

Edgar Montgomery Cullen (December 4, 1843 – May 23, 1922) was an American lawyer, judge, and politician from the state of New York. Cullen is best remembered as the Chief Judge of the New York Court of Appeals from 1904 to 1913.

== Biography ==
=== Early years ===
Edgar Montgomery Cullen was born December 4, 1843, in Brooklyn, New York, the second son of Dr. Henry J. Cullen (1805–1874) and Elizabeth McCue. He attended the Kinderhook Academy and graduated from Columbia College in 1860, where he was a member of the Philolexian Society. After leaving Columbia, Cullen enrolled at the Rensselaer Polytechnic Institute, until his studies were interrupted by the outbreak of the American Civil War.

In 1861, he was commissioned a lieutenant in the First United States Infantry of the regular army, and in 1862 became colonel of the 96th New York Volunteer Infantry at the age of just 19. Cullen took over command of Hiram Burnham's brigade following that officer's death at the Battle of Chaffin's Farm. After his discharge from the Union Army, he resumed at first his engineering studies, but soon changed to the study of law, and was admitted to the bar in 1867.

=== Legal career ===
Cullen became active in Democratic Party politics and served from 1872 to 1875 as an Assistant District Attorney of Kings County. In 1876, he served as a top advisor on the staff of Governor Samuel J. Tilden.

Cullen was elected as a justice of the New York Supreme Court in 1880. He was re-elected to a second 14-year term in 1894. In 1900, Cullen was one of the first three justices appointed under the amendment of 1899 to the Court of Appeals.

After the resignation of Alton B. Parker to run for President of the United States in September 1904, Cullen was appointed by Governor Benjamin Barker Odell, Jr. as Chief Judge of the Court of Appeals. In November 1904, he was elected to a full 14-year term as Chief Judge, nominated as a fusion candidate by Republicans and Democrats.

In 1913, he presided at the impeachment trial of Governor William Sulzer, and voted against conviction.

Cullen retired from the bench at the end of 1913 when he reached the constitutional age limit of 70 years. Afterwards he resumed the practice of law when he joined the law firm Cullen and Dykman LLP based out of 144 Montague Street, Brooklyn.

Cullen was feted at the time of his retirement with a banquet in the grand ballroom of the Waldorf-Astoria Hotel, hosted by the Brooklyn Bar Association and attended by 450 of the most prominent figures in New York political and legal circles, including former Governor and sitting Supreme Court Justice Charles Evans Hughes. In his speech to the gathering, Cullen expressed pride in the legal profession and offered criticism of President Woodrow Wilson's call for judicial appeal to be "short, sharp, and decisive" so that government could more expeditiously function.

Cullen responded:

If the ideal administration of justice in the New Democracy is that instrument of Oriental despotism, the cadi, heaven defend us from such democracy, its doctrines, and all its works.... It is constantly asserted that lawyers constitute too great a factor in the government of the country; that businessmen should control. I admit lawyers are a most potent element in the enactment of the law, and in the administration of government, and, in my judgment, it is fortunate for the people that it is so. * * *

I claim no monopoly of character or of ability for our profession. I know we have unworthy members. I know that at times the Bar has furnished pliant tools for the oppression of the citizen, and the perversion of the law. But I do insist that our standard of character and ability is as high as that of any other vocations. Commerce has not always been the messenger of peace. How many wars have been caused by the commercial rivalry of nations? ...

Nor are the apostles of the New Democracy and the leaders of the movement for the uplift of humanity immaculate. I believe that labor organizations have accomplished great work in behalf of the wage-earners, but to judge how beneficial their rule of the country would be, we have but to recall the crimes committed by many of their members, or if we go further back, to read the history of the Paris Commune in 1871.

We may be, gentlemen, as charged by our traducers, a poor, a very poor set, but in the land of the blind the man with one eye is King...

=== Death and legacy ===
Edgar M. Cullen died on May 23, 1922, at his home at 144 Willow Street in Brooklyn following a serious "stroke of apoplexy," from which he did not recover. He was 78 years old at the time of his death. Cullen's body was buried at the Green-Wood Cemetery in his native Brooklyn.

== Footnotes ==
Legal offices
Preceded by Alton B. Parker	Chief Judge of the New York Court of Appeals; 1904–1913	Succeeded by Willard Bartlett
