= 277 Park Avenue =

Office skyscraper in Manhattan, New York

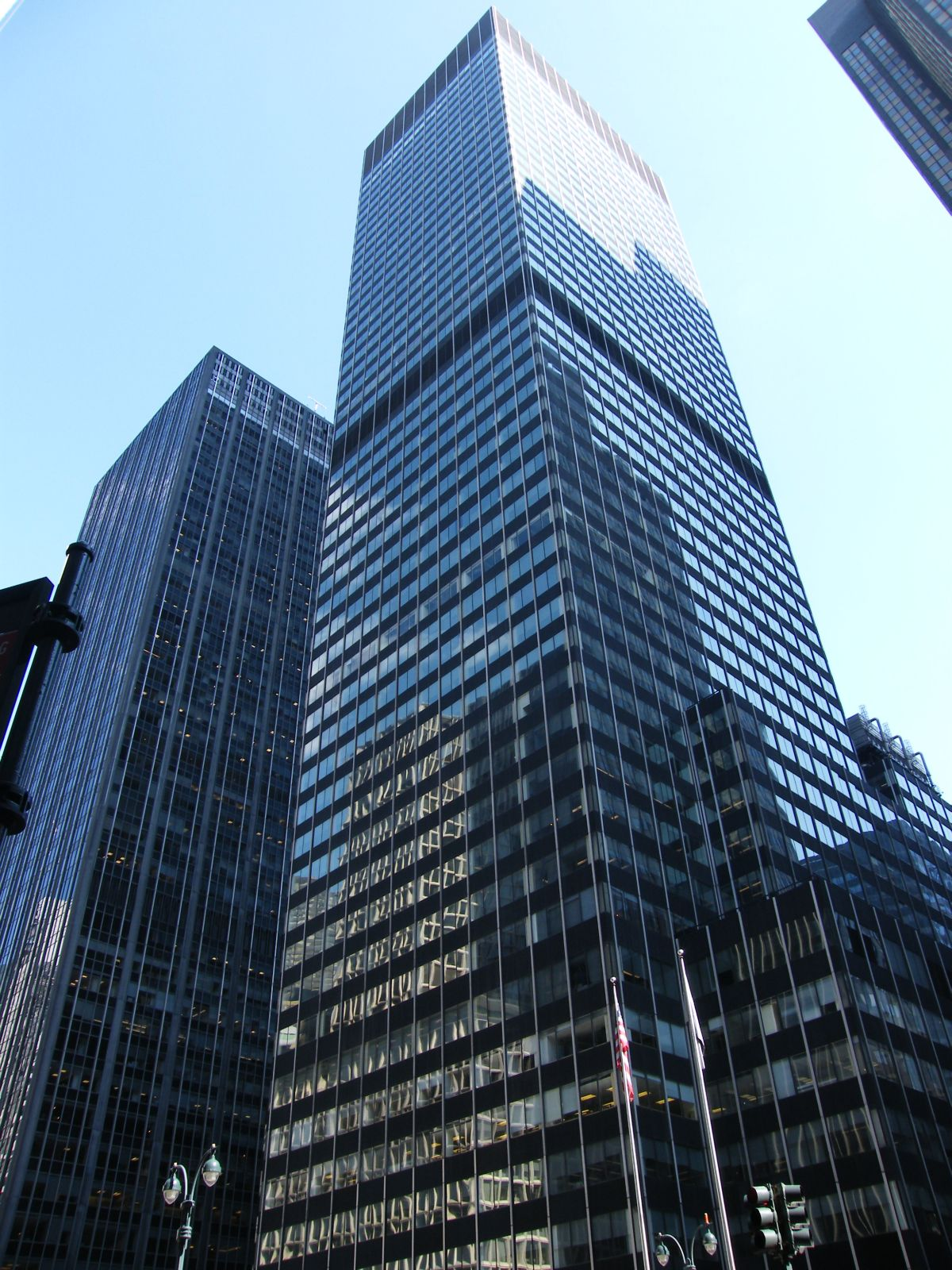
- 277 Park Avenue

General information
- Status: Completed
- Type: Office
- Architectural style: International
- Location: 277 Park Avenue, Manhattan, New York City, New York
- Coordinates: 40°45′19″N 73°58′28″W
- Construction started: 1962
- Completed: 1964
- Opening: July 13, 1964
- Owner: Stahl Organization
- Operator: Stahl Organization

Height
- Roof: 687 ft (209 m)

Technical details
- Floor count: 50
- Floor area: 1,767,499 sq ft (164,206.0 m^{2})

Design and construction
- Architect: Emery Roth & Sons
- Developer: Stanley Stahl

277 Park Avenue is an office building in the Midtown Manhattan neighborhood of New York City. It stands on the east side of Park Avenue between East 47th and 48th Streets, and is 687 feet (209 m) tall, with 50 floors. It is tied with two other buildings, 55 Water Street and 5 Beekman Street, as the 73rd tallest building in New York. The building is assigned its own ZIP Code, 10172; it was one of 41 buildings in Manhattan that had their own ZIP Codes as of 2019.

== History ==
The site was among the landholdings of Elizabeth Goelet Kip and her son George Goelet Kip. In the 1870s, as part of the expansion of nearby Grand Central Depot, the land was subject to a protracted legal battle which resulted in Elizabeth Kip being forced by eminent domain to sell the land to the New York and Harlem Railroad for $212,500. An apartment building designed by McKim, Mead, and White then occupied the site. One tenant of that building was the presidential campaign of John F. Kennedy. The current office building opened on July 13, 1964.

In 2014, the building's owner, the Stahl Organization, received a $1 billion mortgage loan for the building. Stahl began renovating the building in 2022 for $120 million. The Park Ave Kitchen restaurant, operated by David Burke, opened in the building as part of the renovation. The Stahl Organization refinanced the building for $750 million in 2024, putting up $250 million in exchange for a loan from a Deutsche Bank subsidiary.

== Tenants ==
The building currently houses parts of JPMorgan Chase's Investment Bank, Commercial Bank, and other corporate functions. JP Morgan's takeover of Bear Stearns in 2008 resulted in most investment banking employees moving to 383 Madison Avenue to reduce the leased real estate footprint in Midtown. 277 Park Avenue remains under the ownership of the family-owned Stahl Organization, the building's original developer. Previous tenants have included Penthouse Magazine, Schlumberger, Donaldson, Lufkin & Jenrette, Raymond James, and Chemical Bank (predecessor to JPMorgan Chase).

=== List of tenants ===
- Academy Securities
- Agricultural Bank of China
- Australia and New Zealand Banking Group
- Bank of India, US Operations
- Bregal Investments
- Bregal Partners
- Bregal Sagemount
- CCMP Capital
- Cozen O’Connor
- The Hartford
- JPMorgan Chase
- GenesisCrypt Investment and Trading Holdings
- Ladenburg Thalmann & Co. Inc.
- M&T Bank
- Sumitomo Mitsui Banking Corporation
- Visa Inc.

== See also ==
- List of tallest buildings in New York City
