= Stanley Stahl =

American banker and real estate investor

- Born: June 16, 1924; New York City, U.S.
- Died: August 5, 1999 (aged 75); New York City, U.S.
- Education: New York University
- Occupations: Banker, real estate investor
- Spouse: 2, including Cherie Stahl
- Children: 1

Stanley Stahl (1924–1999) was an American banker and real estate investor from New York City.

== Early life ==
Stanley Stahl was born to a Jewish family on June 16, 1924, in New York City. His father, Max Stahl, was a butcher in Brooklyn. He had a sister, Beatrice Marans.

Stahl graduated from New York University, where he received a bachelor's degree in accounting. He served in the United States Army.

== Career ==
Stahl started his career as a real estate broker in Manhattan. He invested in Manhattan real estate, eventually owning both 277 Park Avenue in Midtown Manhattan and the Ansonia on the Upper West Side. He was also the co-owner of Broadway's Lunt-Fontanne Theatre with the Nederlander Organization. In 1982, he acquired the AT&T Building on Madison Avenue in Midtown Manhattan.

In 1969, Stahl co-founded Hirstan Associates, a real estate investment firm, with Abraham Hirschfeld. They owned buildings in Sutton Place. However, when Hirschfeld wanted out of the partnership in 1992, Stahl accused the latter of unfair profit distribution. In retaliation, Stahl was accused of racial discrimination against tenants. In 1998, Hirschfeld was indicted of hiring a hitman to murder Stahl in 1996.

Stahl acquired the Apple Bank for Savings for US$174 million in a hostile takeover in 1990. He was its sole owner.

== Personal life ==
Stahl was married twice. His second wife was named Cherie. He had a son, Gregory Stahl, a stepson, Peter Neger, and a stepdaughter, Simi Matera. Stahl was indicted of bribing an Internal Revenue Service agent and found guilty in 1977, but he won on appeal.

== Death ==
Stahl died of a stroke on August 5, 1999, in a hospital in New York City.
